= Boxing at the 1948 Summer Olympics – Welterweight =

Boxing competitions

Men's welterweight at the Games of the XIV Olympiad
- Venue: Earl's Court; Wembley Arena
- Date: 7–13 August 1948
- Competitors: 26 from 26 nations

Medalists
| 1st place, gold medalist(s) | | Július Torma | Czechoslovakia |
| 2nd place, silver medalist(s) | | Hank Herring | United States |
| 3rd place, bronze medalist(s) | | Alessandro D'Ottavio | Italy |

The men's welterweight boxing competition at the 1948 Olympic Games in London was held from 7 to 13 August at the Empress Hall in Earl's Court and the Wembley Arena.

== Competition format ==
Like all Olympic boxing events, the competition was a straight single-elimination tournament. The competition began with a preliminary round on 9 August, where the number of competitors was reduced to 16, and concluded with a final on 13 August. As there were less than 32 boxers in the competition, a number of boxers received a bye for the preliminary round. All bouts consisted of three periods where the boxers received points for every successful punch they land on their opponent's head or upper body. The boxer with the most points at the end of the bouts wins. If a boxer is knocked to the ground and cannot get up before the referee counts to 10 then the bout is over and the opponent wins.

== Results ==
Round of 32
Gharib Afifi (EGY)
Peter Foran (IRL) | PTS
Édouard Bombart (BEL)
Hank Herring (USA) | PTS
Alex Obeysekere (CEY) | PTS
Anwar Pasha Turki (PAK)
Zygmunt Chychła (POL) | PTS
Frits Wijngaard (NED)
Gunnar Hansen (NOR)
Pierre Hernandez (FRA) | PTS
Alessandro D'Ottavio (ITA) | PTS
George Issabeg (IRI)
Max Shacklady (GBR) | KO-3
Christian Kristensen (DEN)
Robert Cranston (IND)
Aurelio Díaz (ESP) | PTS
Gusztáv Bene (HUN)
Július Torma (TCH) | PTS
Clifford Blackburn (CAN) | PTS
Mariano Vélez (PHI)

Round of 16
Billy Boyce (AUS) | PTS
Léon Roller (LUX)
Duggie Du Preez (RSA) | PTS
Feliciano Rossano (URU)
Eladio Herrera (ARG) | PTS
Humberto Loayza (CHI)
Peter Foran (IRL)
Hank Herring (USA) | PTS
Alex Obeysekere (CEY)
Zygmunt Chychła (POL) | KO-2
Pierre Hernandez (FRA)
Alessandro D'Ottavio (ITA) | PTS
Max Shacklady (GBR)
Aurelio Díaz (ESP) | PTS
Július Torma (TCH) | RSC-2
Cliff Blackburn (CAN)

Quarter-finals
Billy Boyce (AUS)
Duggie Du Preez (RSA) | PTS
Eladio Herrera (ARG)
Hank Herring (USA) | PTS
Zygmunt Chychła (POL)
Alessandro D'Ottavio (ITA) | PTS
Aurelio Díaz (ESP)
Július Torma (TCH) | DSQ-2

Semi-finals
Duggie Du Preez (RSA)
Hank Herring (USA) | PTS
Alessandro D'Ottavio (ITA)
Július Torma (TCH) | PTS

Final
Hank Herring (USA)
Július Torma (TCH) | PTS
Third place
Duggie Du Preez (RSA)
Alessandro D'Ottavio (ITA) | PTS

Július Torma fractured his left hand during his second round bout against Cliff Blackburn, but was able to hide the injury in his remaining bouts, through careful defending and judicious use of his right hand.
