= Boxing at the 1952 Summer Olympics – Welterweight =

Olympic boxing tournament

Welterweight boxing at the Games of the XV Olympiad
- Venue: Messuhalli
- Dates: 29 July – 2 August 1952
- Competitors: 29 from 29 nations

Medalists
1st place, gold medalist(s)		Zygmunt Chychla	Poland
2nd place, silver medalist(s)		Sergei Scherbakov	Soviet Union
3rd place, bronze medalist(s)		Günther Heidemann	Germany
3rd place, bronze medalist(s)		Victor Jörgensen	Denmark

The men's welterweight event was part of the boxing programme at the 1952 Summer Olympics. The weight class allowed boxers of up to 67 kilograms to compete. The competition was held from 29 July to 2 August 1952. 29 boxers from 29 nations competed.

== Medalists ==
Gold	Zygmunt Chychla; Poland
Silver	Sergei Scherbakov; Soviet Union
Bronze	Günther Heidemann; Germany
Bronze	Victor Jörgensen; Denmark

== Results ==
Winner	NOC	Result	Loser	NOC
First Round (July 29)
Ron Norris	India	BYE
Jacob Butula	Canada	BYE
Iivari Malmikoski	Finland	BYE
Victor Jörgensen	Denmark	TKO 2R	Alexandre Dib	Brazil
Sergei Scherbakov	Soviet Union	DISG 3R	Marcos Sarfatti	Argentina
Hendrik van der Linde	South Africa	TKO 1R	Anwar Pasha	Pakistan
Harry Gunnarsson	Sweden	TKO 2R	Peter Crotty	Ireland
Franco Vescovi	Italy	2 – 0	Jeannot Welter	Luxembourg
Július Torma	Czechoslovakia	2 – 1	Johnny Maloney	Great Britain
Louis Gage	United States	KO 1R	Ali Belkacem	France
Zygmunt Chychla	Poland	3 – 0	Pierre Wouters	Belgium
José Dávalos	Mexico	TKO 3R	Vicente Tuñacao	Philippines
Günther Heidemann	Germany	2 – 1	Pál Budai	Hungary
Nicolae Linca	Romania	3 – 0	Sergio Gascue	Venezuela
George Issabeg	Iran	DISG 3R	Fathi Abdel Rahman	Egypt
Moos Linneman	Netherlands	Walk-over in 3R	Peter Müller	Switzerland
Second Round (July 29 & 30)
Ron Norris	India	TKO 3R	Jacob Butula	Canada
Victor Jörgensen	Denmark	2 – 1	Ivar Mikael Malmikoski	Finland
Sergei Scherbakov	Soviet Union	KO 2R	Hendrik Dirk van der Linde	South Africa
Franco Vescovi	Italy	Walk-over	Gunnar Harry Ingemar Gunnarsson	Sweden
Július Torma	Czechoslovakia	2 – 1	Louis Gage	United States
Zygmunt Chychla	Poland	3 – 0	José Luis Dávalos Noriega	Mexico
Günther Heidemann	Germany	TKO 1R	Nicolae Linca	Romania
Moos Linneman	Netherlands	2 – 1	George Issabeg	Iran
Third Round (July 31)
Zygmunt Chychla	Poland	2 – 1	Július Torma	Czechoslovakia
Victor Jörgensen	Denmark	3 – 0	Ron Norris	India
Günther Heidemann	Germany	3 – 0	Moos Linneman	Netherlands
Sergei Scherbakov	Soviet Union	3 – 0	Franco Vescovi	Italy
Semi-final (August 1)
Sergei Scherbakov	Soviet Union	3 – 0	Victor Jörgensen	Denmark
Zygmunt Chychla	Poland	2 – 1	Günther Heidemann	Germany
Final (August 2)
Zygmunt Chychla	Poland	3 – 0	Sergei Scherbakov	Soviet Union
