= Július Torma =

Slovak boxer

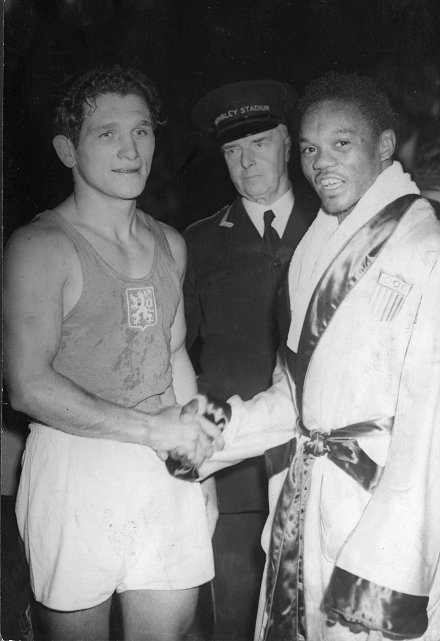
- This is a photo of 1948 Olympic Welterweight Boxing Champion Július Torma (L) being congratulated by runner-up Hank Herring (R) of the USA

Personal information
- Nationality: Czechoslovak
- Born: 7 March 1922 Budapest, Hungary
- Died: 23 October 1991 (aged 69) Prague, Czechoslovakia
- Weight: Welterweight

Boxing career
Medal record
Men's Boxing
Representing Czechoslovakia
Olympic Games
Gold medal – first place	1948 London	Welterweight
European Amateur Championships
Bronze medal – third place	1947 Dublin	Middleweight
Gold medal – first place	1949 Oslo	Welterweight
Bronze medal – third place	1955 West Berlin	Light Heavyweight

Július Torma (7 March 1922 – 23 October 1991) was a Slovak boxer competing for Czechoslovakia. He won the gold medal at the Olympic Games in 1948 for Czechoslovakia in the category up to 67 kg. He competed in three consecutive Summer Olympics (1948, 1952 and 1956).

Torma defeated Hank Herring of the United States in the 1948 final. Torma also competed as a welterweight in 1952, losing in the quarterfinals; and in 1956, as a Middleweight. He was born in Budapest and died in Prague.

== Olympic results ==
London - 1948 (as a Welterweight)

- Round of 32: Defeated Gusztav Bene (Hungary) on points
- Round of 16: Defeated Clifford Blackburn (Canada) second-round knockout
- Quarterfinal: Defeated Aurelio Diaz (Spain) by disqualification in second round
- Semifinal: Defeated Alessandro D'Ottavio (Italy) on points
- Final: Defeated Hank Herring (United States) on points (won gold medal)

Helsinki - 1952 (as a Welterweight)

- Round of 32: Defeated John Patrick Maloney (Great Britain) by decision, 2-1
- Round of 16: Defeated Louis Gage (United States) by decision, 2-1
- Quarterfinal: Lost to Zygmunt Chychła (Poland) by decision, 1-2

Melbourne - 1956 (as a Middleweight)

- Defeated Howard Richter (Australia) points
- Lost to Ramón Tapia (Chile) KO by 2

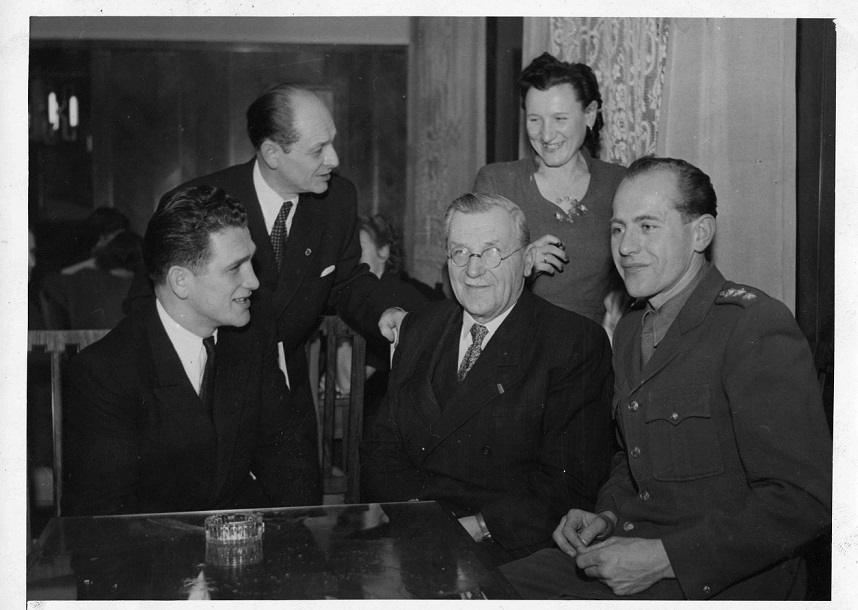
L-R: Július Torma, Prime Minister of Czechoslovakia Antonín Zápotocký, Mayor of Prague Václav Vacek, World All-Around Gymnastics Champion Vlasta Děkanová, Olympic Running Champion Emil Zátopek at the 1948 London Summer Olympics
