= Zygmunt Chychła =

Polish boxer

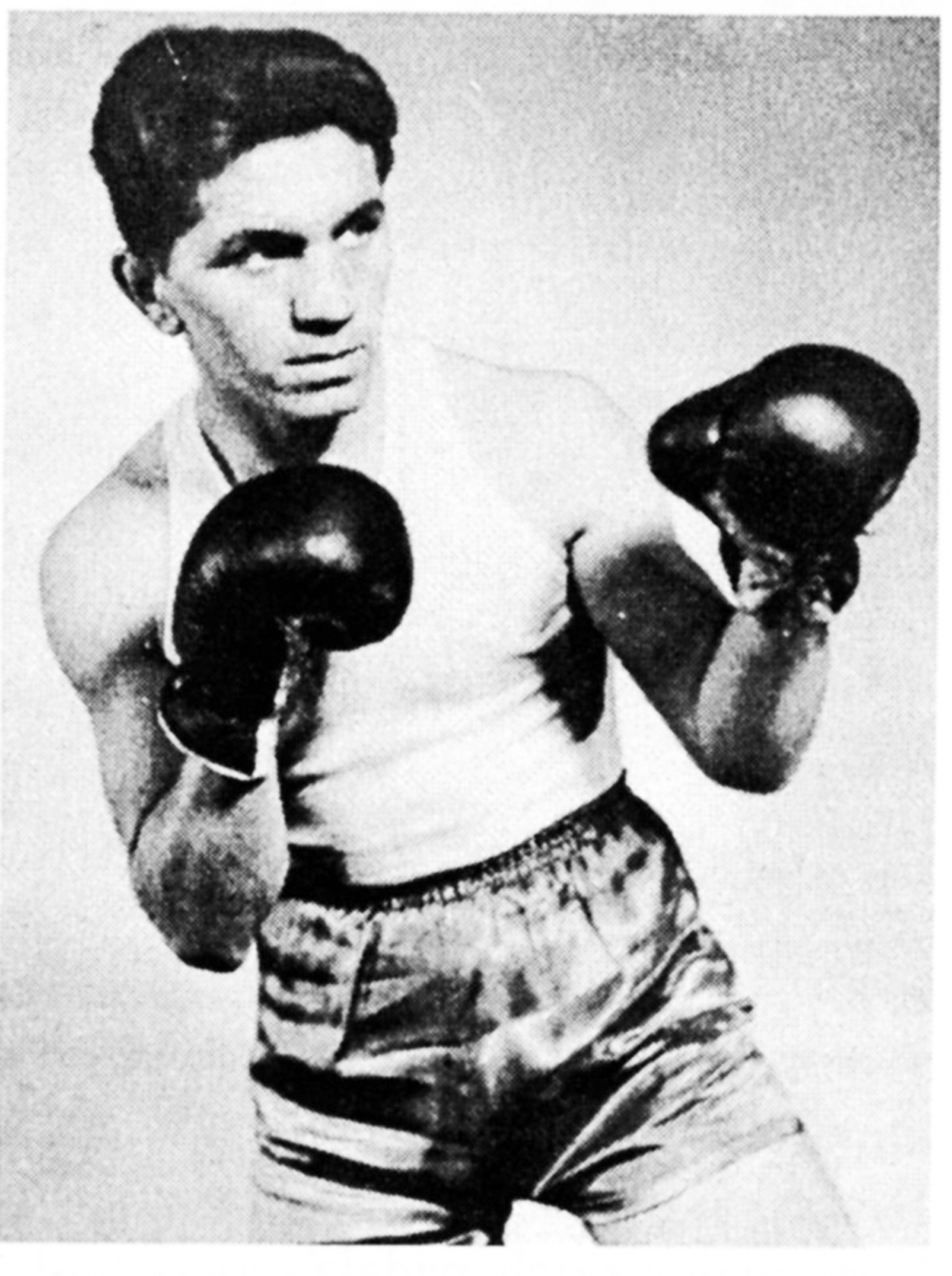

Personal information
- Nationality: (Poland) Polish
- Born: 5 November 1926 Free City of Danzig
- Died: 26 September 2009 (aged 82) Hamburg, Germany

Sport
- Country: Poland
- Sport: Boxing
- Weight class: Welterweight
Medal record
Men's Boxing
Representing Poland
Olympic Games
Gold medal – first place	1952 Helsinki	Welterweight
European Amateur Championships
Gold medal – first place	1951 Milan	Welterweight
Gold medal – first place	1953 Warsaw	Welterweight

Zygmunt Chychła (5 November 1926 – 26 September 2009) was a Polish boxer. He won the first post-World War II Olympic gold medal for Poland.

== Career ==
In 1939 he began training at the Polish boxing club Gedania, having started boxing at the age 12. During the war he lost his Gdańsk citizenship and was compulsorily conscripted into the Wehrmacht in 1944. In France he deserted and joined the 2nd Polish Army, led by general Władysław Anders, in Italy. He returned to Poland in 1946.

In 1947, he made his debut with the national boxing team of Poland, led by famous coach Feliks Stamm. He started at the 1948 London Olympic Games and reached the quarterfinal. In 1951 he won the European Amateur Boxing Championships in Milan. He was chosen the best Polish Sportspersonality of the Year in a Plebiscite of the Sport Review.

Chychła won the gold medal at the 1952 Summer Olympics in Helsinki beating in the final a representative of the Soviet Union, Sergei Scherbakov. On the way to the final, he won against Július Torma (Czechoslovakia), the Olympic Champion from London in 1948 and the European Champion from Oslo in 1949. In the same year he was again selected by the Plebiscite of the Przegląd Sportowy.

After the Olympic Games, he found out that he was ill with tuberculosis. He decided to resign from sports. However, not wanting to lack a competitor at the 1953 European Amateur Boxing Championships in Warsaw, the Polish sports authorities introduced him by mistake, claiming that the disease had backed off. He again won the gold medal there. However, due to lack of treatment, Chychła's tuberculosis worsened, causing a considerable pit in his lungs. Debilitated, he ended his sporting career in 1953. In the early 1970s, he emigrated to Germany.

He boxed 17 times for the national team of Poland (15 fights won and 2 lost). In his career, he fought 263 fights: 241 won, 10 tied, and 12 lost.

He was awarded the Honourable Citizen of City of Gdańsk title in 2003.

Zygmunt Chychła died on 26 September 2009 in Senior's House in Hamburg.

== Statistics ==
Chychła won the welterweight gold medal at the 1952 Helsinki Olympic games.

=== Olympic results ===
- Defeated Pierre Wouters (Belgium) 3–0
- Defeated José Luis Dávalos Noriega (Mexico) 3–0
- Defeated Július Torma (Czechoslovakia) 2–1
- Defeated Günther Heidemann (West Germany) 2–1
- Defeated Sergei Scherbakov (Soviet Union) 3–0

== See also ==
- Boxing at the 1952 Summer Olympics
