= Gunnar Hansen (disambiguation) =

Gunnar Hansen (1947–2015) was an Icelandic-born American actor and author

Gunnar Hansen may also refer to:

- Gunnar Hansen (boxer) (1916–2004), Norwegian boxer
- Gunnar Hansen (footballer) (1923–2005), Norwegian footballer
