= Léon Roller =

Luxembourgish boxer

Personal information
- Nationality: Luxembourgish
- Born: 5 January 1928; Luxembourg, Luxembourg
- Died: 19 November 1993 (aged 65); Luxembourg, Luxembourg

Sport
- Sport: Boxing

Léon Roller (5 January 1928 – 19 November 1993) was a Luxembourgish boxer. He competed in the men's welterweight event at the 1948 Summer Olympics. At the 1948 Summer Olympics, he received an opening-round bye before losing his first bout to Billy Boyce of Australia by decision in the Round of 16.
