= 2002 United States House of Representatives elections in New York =

- November 5, 2002

All 29 New York seats to the United States House of Representatives
	Majority party	Minority party
Party	Democratic	Republican
Last election	19	12
Seats won	19	10
Seat change	Steady	▼2
- Results: Democratic hold Democratic gain Republican hold

The 2002 United States House of Representatives elections in New York were held alongside the rest of the country on November 5, 2002. Out of the two districts lost in the decennial re-apportionment process, one was formerly held by the Democratic Party, and one was formerly held by the Republican Party. However, the Democratic Party managed to gain an unrelated seat from the Republican Party, thereby resulting in the maintenance of their seats in the delegation, while the Republican Party had a net loss of two seats (one from redistricting, and one from electoral loss).

== Overview ==
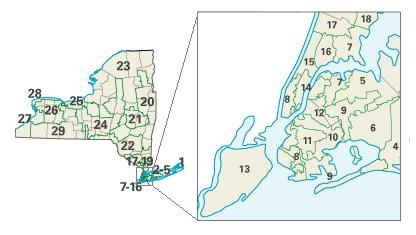
New York congressional districts

District	Incumbent	Party	Elected	Status	Opponent
1	Felix Grucci	Republican	2000	Running	Timothy Bishop (D) 50.23% Felix Grucci (R) 48.59% Lorna Salzman (G) 1.19%
2	Steve Israel	Democrat	2000	Running	Steve Israel (D) 58.48% Joseph Finley (R) 40.46% John Keenan (G) 1.07%
3	Peter King	Republican	1992	Running	Peter King (R) 71.88% Stuart Finz (D) 27.22% Janeen DePrima (Lib) 0.89%
4	Carolyn McCarthy	Democrat	1996	Running	Carolyn McCarthy (D) 56.25% Marilyn O'Grady (R) 43.24% Tim Derham (G) 0.51%
5	Gary Ackerman	Democrat	1983	Running	Gary Ackerman (D) 68% Perry Reich (Con) 7.68%
6	Gregory W. Meeks	Democrat	1998	Running	Gregory W. Meeks (D) 96.51% Rey Clarke (Ind) 3.49%
7	Joseph Crowley	Democrat	1998	Running	Joseph Crowley (D) 73.29% Kevin Brawley (R) 26.71%
8	Jerrold Nadler	Democrat	1992	Running	Jerrold Nadler (D) 76.07% Jim Farrin (R) 18.48% Alan Jay Gerber (Con) 3.16% Dan Wentzel (G) 1.80% Joseph Dobrian (L) 0.49%
9	Anthony Weiner	Democrat	1998	Running	Anthony Weiner (D) 65.71% Alfred Donohue (R) 34.29%
10	Ed Towns	Democrat	1982	Running	Ed Towns (D) 97.83% Herbert Ryan (R) 2.17%
11	Major Owens	Democrat	1982	Running	Major Owens (D) 86.56% Susan Cleary (R) 12.55% Alice Gaffney (Con) 0.90%
12	Nydia Velázquez	Democrat	1992	Running	Nydia Velázquez (D) 95.81% Cesar Estevez (R) 4.19%
13	Vito Fossella	Republican	1997	Running	Vito Fossella (R) 69.63% Arne Mattsson (D) 28.32% Anita Lerman (Ind) 1.38% Henry Bardel (G) 0.67%
14	Carolyn Maloney	Democrat	1992	Running	Carolyn Maloney (D) 75.25% Anton Srdanovic (R) 24.75%
15	Charles B. Rangel	Democrat	1970	Running	Charles B. Rangel (D) 88.46% Jessie Fields (R) 11.54%
16	Jose Serrano	Democrat	1990	Running	Jose Serrano (D) 92.07% Frank Dellavalle (R) 7.93%
17	Eliot Engel	Democrat	1988	Running	Eliot Engel (D) 62.61% Scott Vanderhoef (R) 34.43% Arthur Gallagher (RTL) 1% Elizabeth Shanklin (G) 1.41%
18	Nita Lowey	Democrat	1988	Running	Nita Lowey (D) 92.04% Michael J. Reynolds (R) 7.96%
19	Sue Kelly	Republican	1994	Running	Sue Kelly (R) 69.97% Janine Selendy (D) 25.98% Christine Tighe (RTL) 2.53% Jonathan Wright (G) 1.53%
20	John Sweeney	Republican	1998	Running	John Sweeney (R) 73.32% Frank Stoppenbach (D) 23.98% Margaret Lewis (G) 2.70%
21	Mike McNulty	Democrat	1988	Running	Mike McNulty (D) 75.09% Charles Rosenstein (R) 24.91%
22	Maurice Hinchey	Democrat	1992	Running	Maurice Hinchey (D) 64.19% Eric Hall (R) 32.87% Steven Greenfield (G) 1.54% Paul Laux (RTL) 1.40%
23	John McHugh	Republican	1992	Running	John McHugh (R) unopposed
24	Sherwood Boehlert	Republican	1982	Running	Sherwood Boehlert (R) 70.70% David Walrath (Con) 21.59% Mark Dunau (G) 4.36% Kathleen Peters (RTL) 3.34%
25	Jim Walsh	Republican	1988	Running	Jim Walsh (R) 72.29% Stephanie Aldersley (D) 26.64% Francis Gavin (G) 1.07%
26	Tom Reynolds	Republican	1998	Running	Tom Reynolds (R) 73.63% Ayesha Nariman (D) 22.42% Shawn Harris (RTL) 2.23% Paul Fallon (G) 1.71%
27	Jack Quinn	Republican	1992	Running	Jack Quinn (R) 69.06% Peter Crotty (D) 27.49% Thomas Casey (RTL) 2.06% Albert LaBruna (G) 1.38%
28	Louise Slaughter	Democrat	1986	Running	Louise Slaughter (D) 62.46% Henry Wojtaszek (R) 37.54%
29	Amo Houghton	Republican	1986	Retiring	Amo Houghton (R) 73.10% Kisun Peters (D) 21.26% Wendy Johnson (RTL) 3.34% Rachel Treichler (G) 2.30%

== District 1 ==
2002 New York's 1st congressional district election
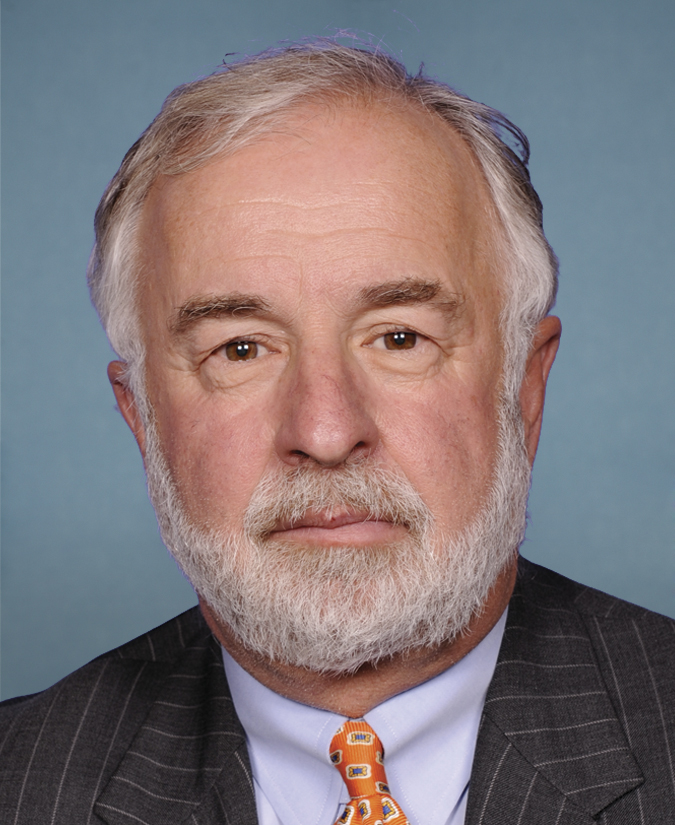

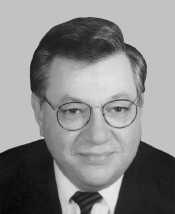
Nominee	Timothy Bishop	Felix Grucci
Party	Democratic	Republican
Percentage	50.2%	48.6%
- County results Bishop: 50–60%
U.S. Representative before election
Felix Grucci
Republican
Elected U.S. Representative
Timothy Bishop
Democratic

=== Predictions ===
Source	Ranking	As of
Sabato's Crystal Ball	Lean D (flip)	November 4, 2002
New York Times	Safe R	October 14, 2002

== District 2 ==
2002 New York's 2nd congressional district election
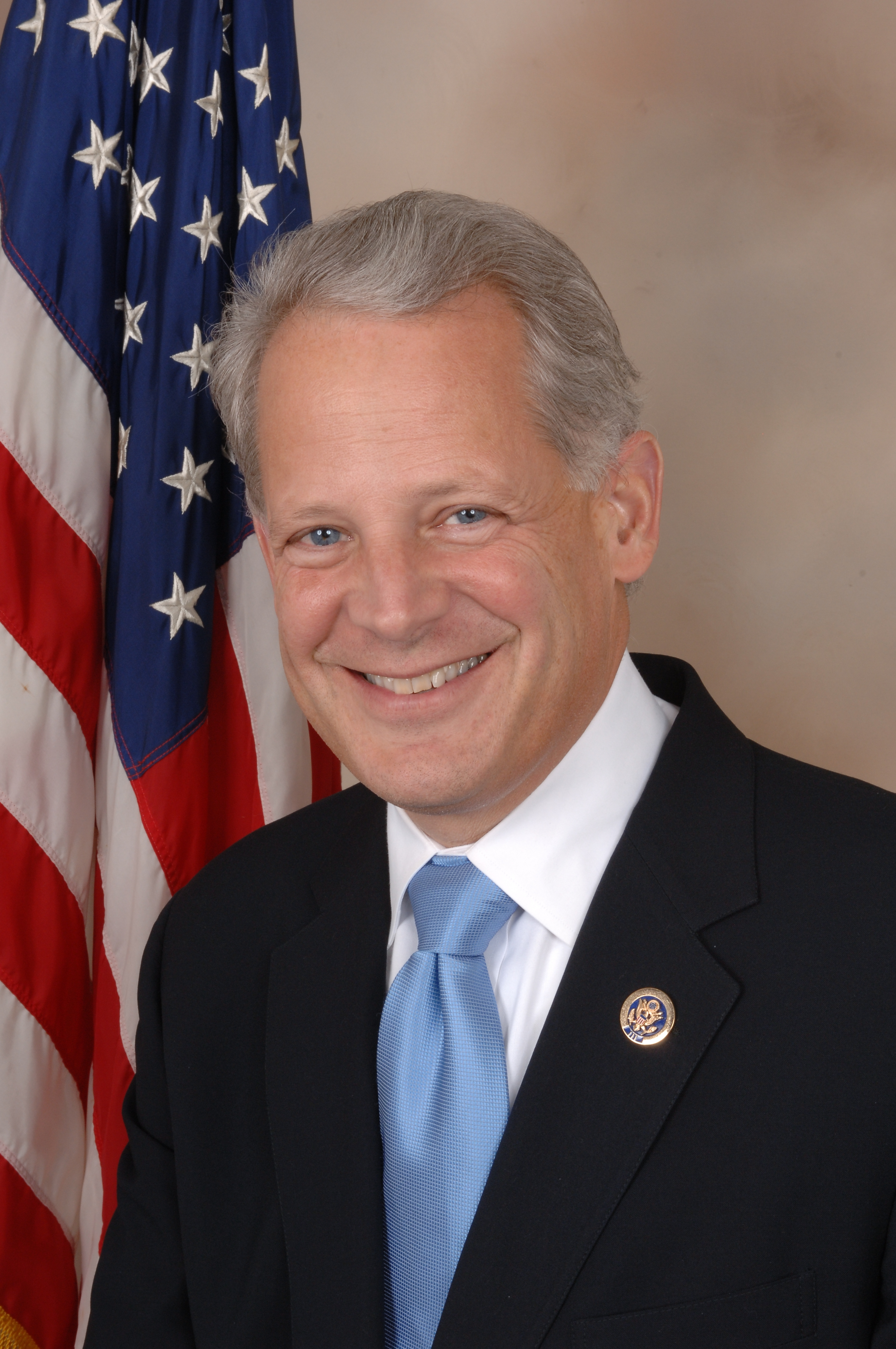

Nominee	Steve Israel	Joseph Finley
Party	Democratic	Republican
Percentage	58.5%	40.5%
- County results Israel: 50–60% 70–80%
U.S. Representative before election
Steve Israel
Democratic
Elected U.S. Representative
Steve Israel
Democratic

=== Predictions ===
Source	Ranking	As of
Sabato's Crystal Ball	Safe D	November 4, 2002
New York Times	Safe D	October 14, 2002

== District 3 ==
2002 New York's 3rd congressional district election
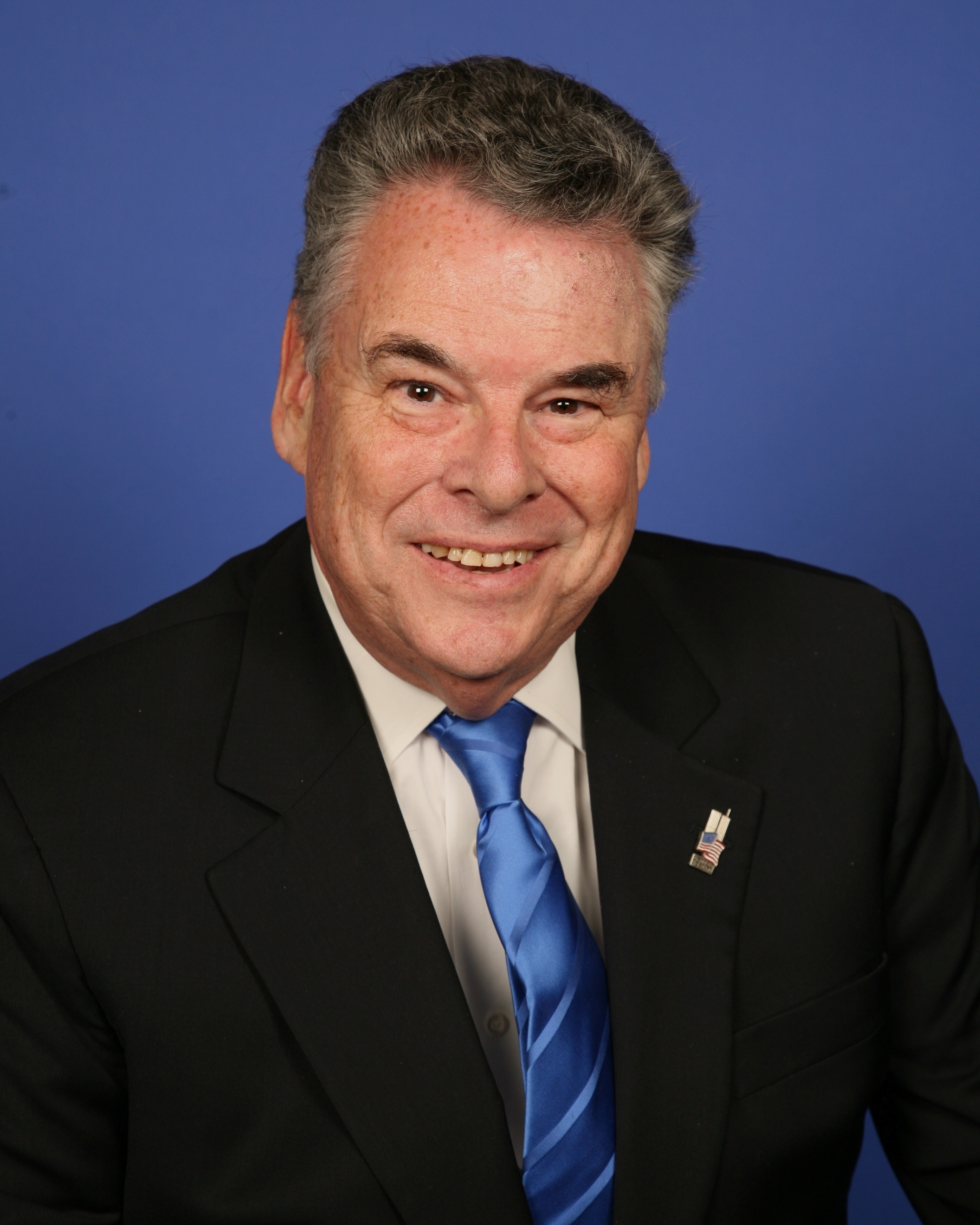

Nominee	Peter King	Stuart Finz
Party	Republican	Democratic
Percentage	71.9%	27.2%
- County results King: 70–80%
U.S. Representative before election
Peter King
Republican
Elected U.S. Representative
Peter King
Republican

=== Predictions ===
Source	Ranking	As of
Sabato's Crystal Ball	Safe R	November 4, 2002
New York Times	Safe R	October 14, 2002

== District 4 ==
2002 New York's 4th congressional district election
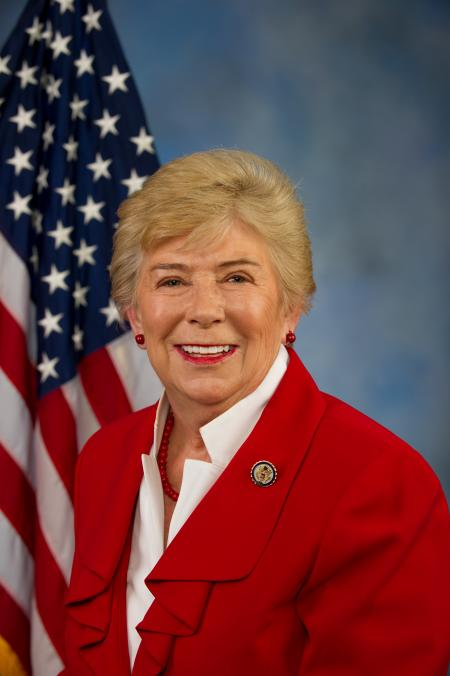
Nominee	Carolyn McCarthy	Marilyn O'Grady
Party	Democratic	Republican
Percentage	56.3%	43.2%
- County results Mccarthy: 50–60%
U.S. Representative before election
Carolyn McCarthy
Democratic
Elected U.S. Representative
Carolyn McCarthy
Democratic

=== Predictions ===
Source	Ranking	As of
Sabato's Crystal Ball	Safe D	November 4, 2002
New York Times	Safe D	October 14, 2002

== District 5 ==
2002 New York's 5th congressional district election
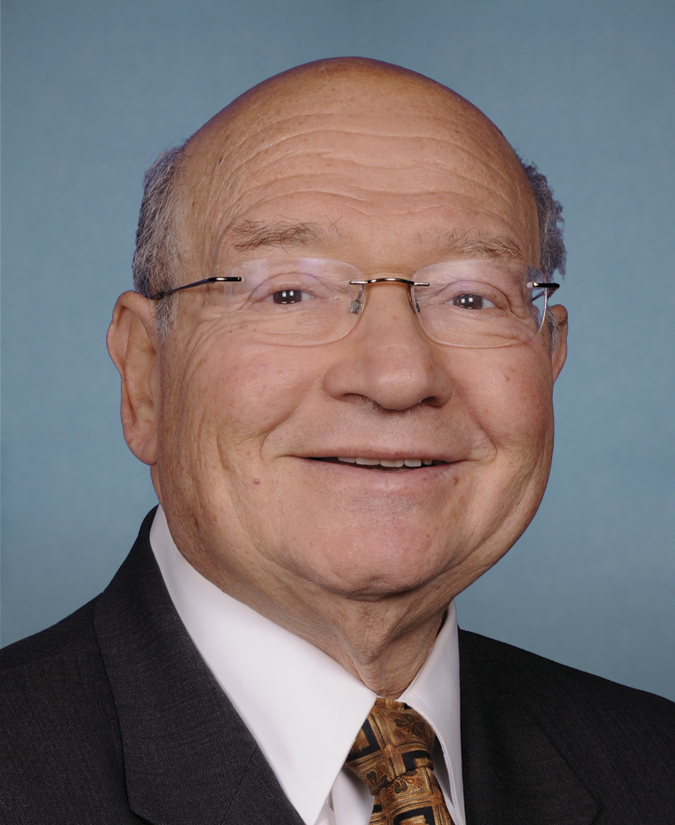

Nominee	Gary Ackerman	Perry Reich
Party	Democratic	Conservative
Popular vote	75,810	5,718
Percentage	93.0%	7.0%
U.S. Representative before election
Gary Ackerman
Democratic
Elected U.S. Representative
Gary Ackerman
Democratic

=== Predictions ===
Source	Ranking	As of
Sabato's Crystal Ball	Safe D	November 4, 2002
New York Times	Safe D	October 14, 2002

Results

New York's 5th congressional district election, 2002
Party	Candidate	Votes	%
Democratic	Gary Ackerman	75,810	92.99%
Conservative	Perry Reich	5,718	7.01%
Total votes		81,528	100.00%

== District 6 ==
2002 New York's 6th congressional district election
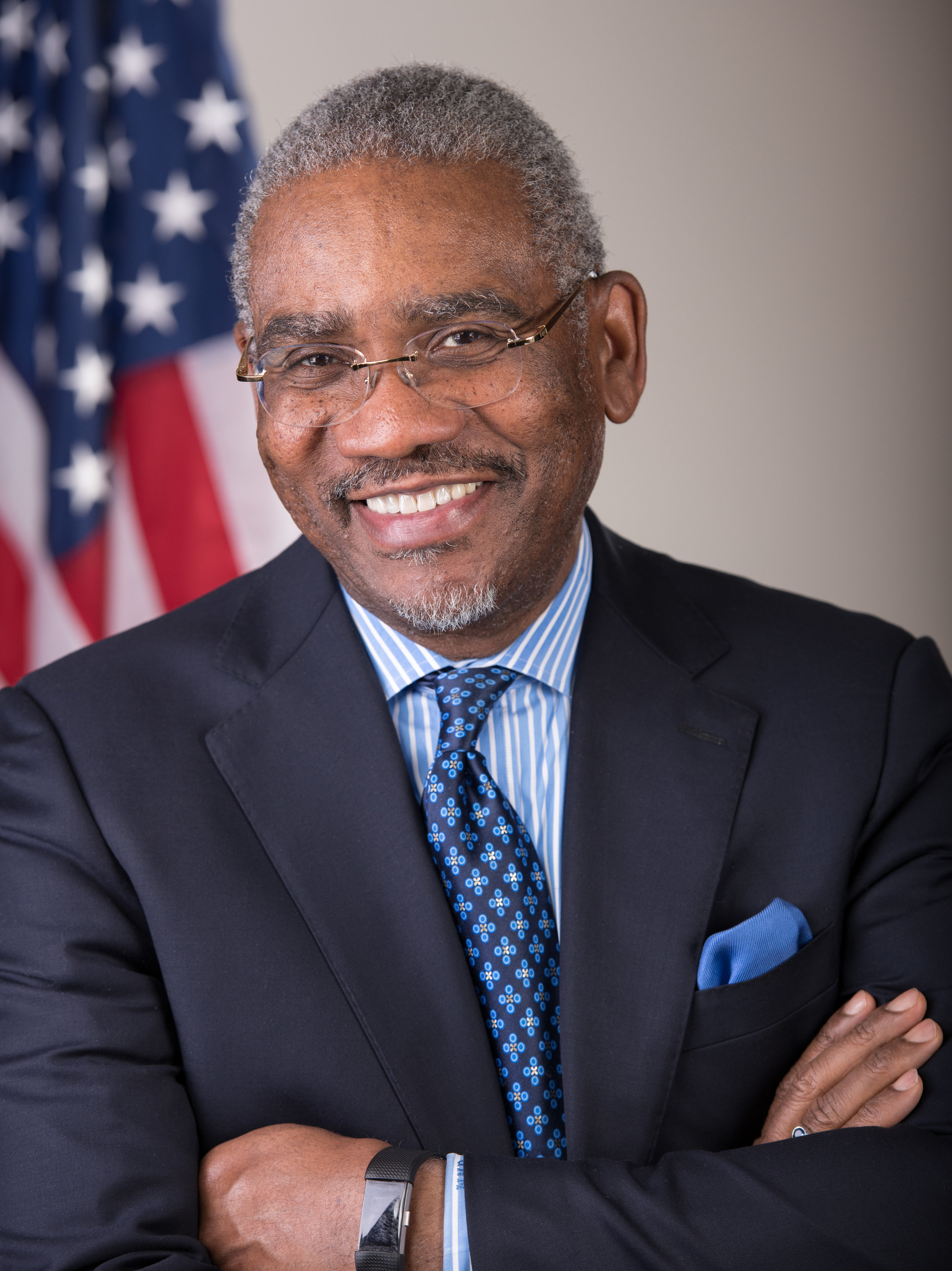

Nominee	Gregory W. Meeks	Rey Clarke
Party	Democratic	Independence
Percentage	96.5%	3.5%
- County results Meeks: 90–100%
U.S. Representative before election
Gregory W. Meeks
Democratic
Elected U.S. Representative
Gregory W. Meeks
Democratic

=== Predictions ===
Source	Ranking	As of
Sabato's Crystal Ball	Safe D	November 4, 2002
New York Times	Safe D	October 14, 2002

== District 7 ==
2002 New York's 7th congressional district election
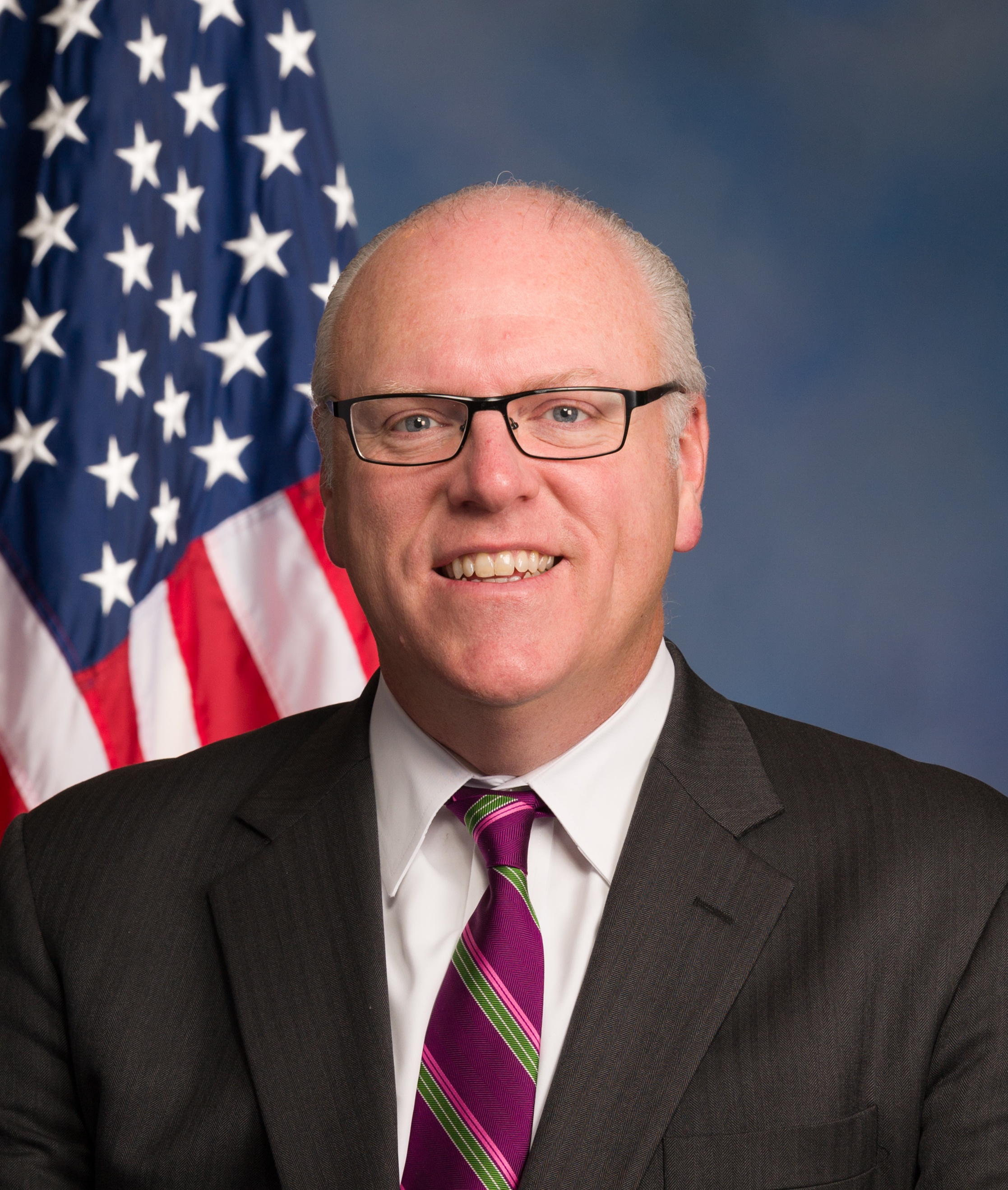

Nominee	Joseph Crowley	Kevin Brawley
Party	Democratic	Republican
Percentage	73.3%	26.7%
- County results Crowley: 70–80%
U.S. Representative before election
Joseph Crowley
Democratic
Elected U.S. Representative
Joseph Crowley
Democratic

=== Predictions ===
Source	Ranking	As of
Sabato's Crystal Ball	Safe D	November 4, 2002
New York Times	Safe D	October 14, 2002

== District 8 ==
2002 New York's 8th congressional district election
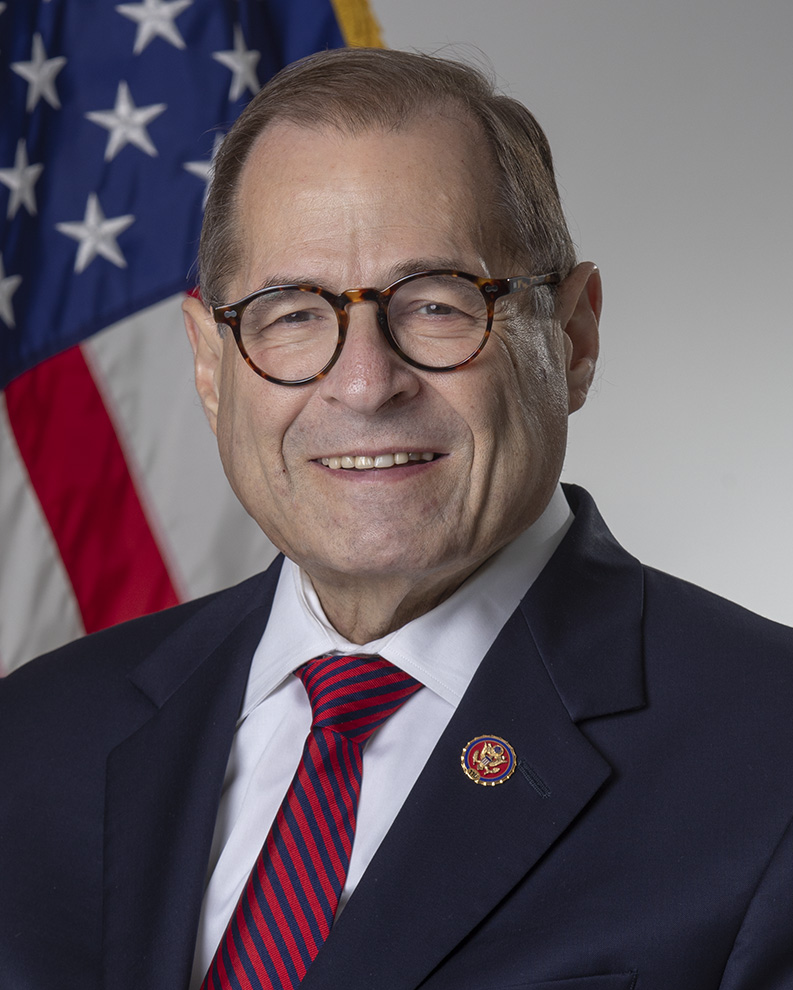

Nominee	Jerrold Nadler	Jim Farrin
Party	Democratic	Republican
Percentage	76.1%	18.5%
- County results Nadler: 60–70% 80–90%
U.S. Representative before election
Jerrold Nadler
Democratic
Elected U.S. Representative
Jerrold Nadler
Democratic

=== Predictions ===
Source	Ranking	As of
Sabato's Crystal Ball	Safe D	November 4, 2002
New York Times	Safe D	October 14, 2002

== District 9 ==
2002 New York's 9th congressional district election
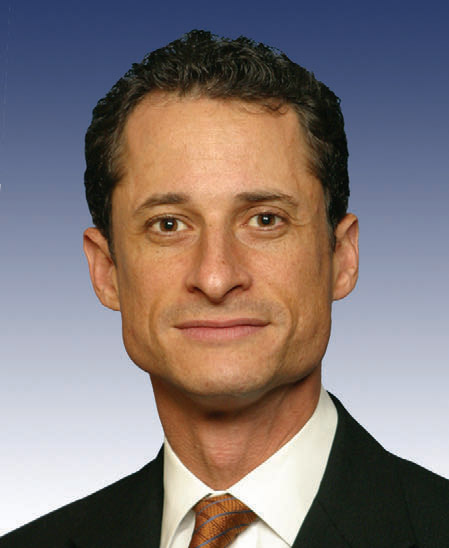

Nominee	Anthony Weiner	Alfred Donohue
Party	Democratic	Republican
Percentage	65.7%	34.3%
- County results Weiner: 60–70% 70–80%
U.S. Representative before election
Anthony Weiner
Democratic
Elected U.S. Representative
Anthony Weiner
Democratic

=== Predictions ===
Source	Ranking	As of
Sabato's Crystal Ball	Safe D	November 4, 2002
New York Times	Safe D	October 14, 2002

== District 10 ==
2002 New York's 10th congressional district election
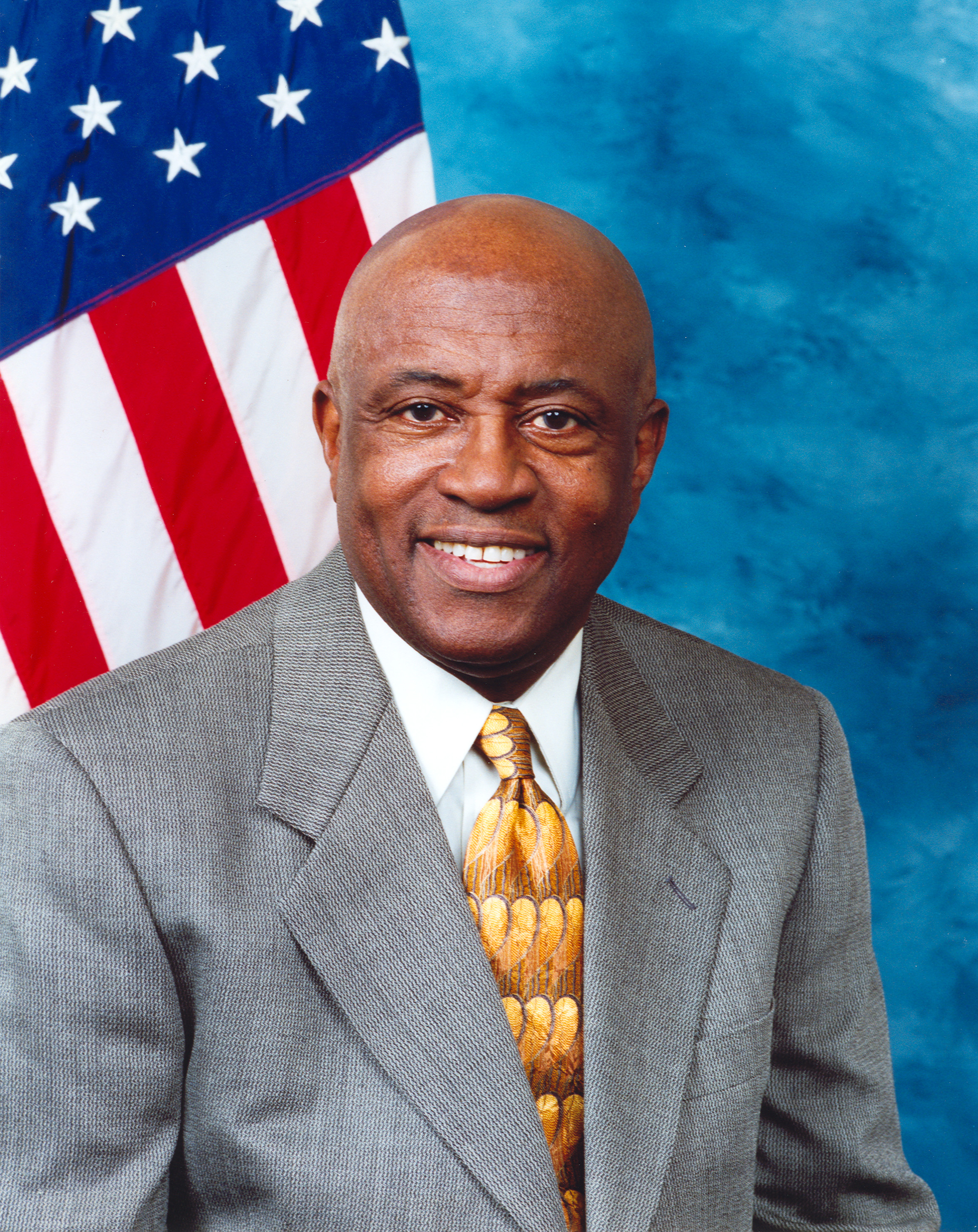

Nominee	Ed Towns	Herbert Ryan
Party	Democratic	Republican
Percentage	97.8%	2.2%
- County results Towns: 90–100%
U.S. Representative before election
Ed Towns
Democratic
Elected U.S. Representative
Ed Towns
Democratic

=== Predictions ===
Source	Ranking	As of
Sabato's Crystal Ball	Safe D	November 4, 2002
New York Times	Safe D	October 14, 2002

== District 11 ==
2002 New York's 11th congressional district election
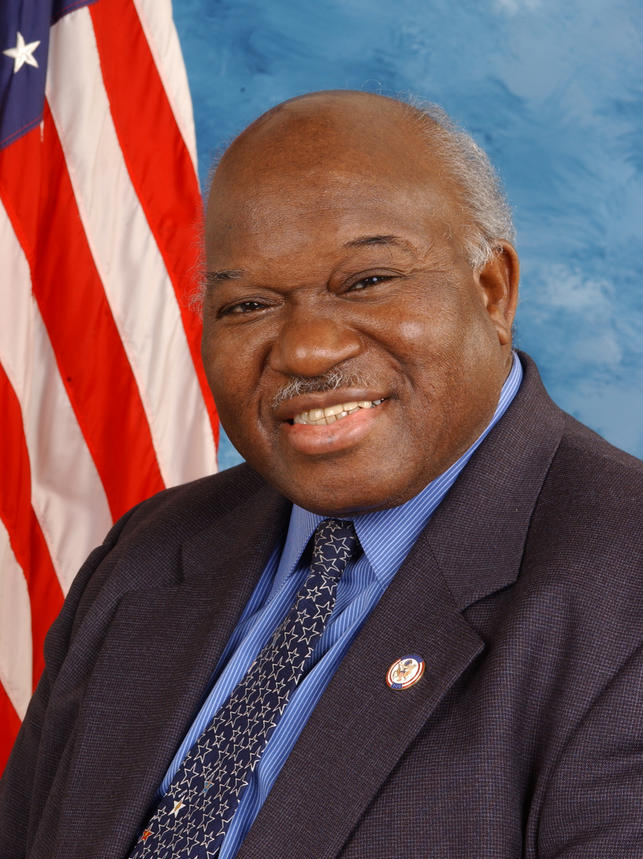

Nominee	Major Owens	Susan Cleary
Party	Democratic	Republican
Percentage	86.6%	12.6%
- County results Owens: 80–90%
U.S. Representative before election
Major Owens
Democratic
Elected U.S. Representative
Major Owens
Democratic

=== Predictions ===
Source	Ranking	As of
Sabato's Crystal Ball	Safe D	November 4, 2002
New York Times	Safe D	October 14, 2002

== District 12 ==
2002 New York's 12th congressional district election
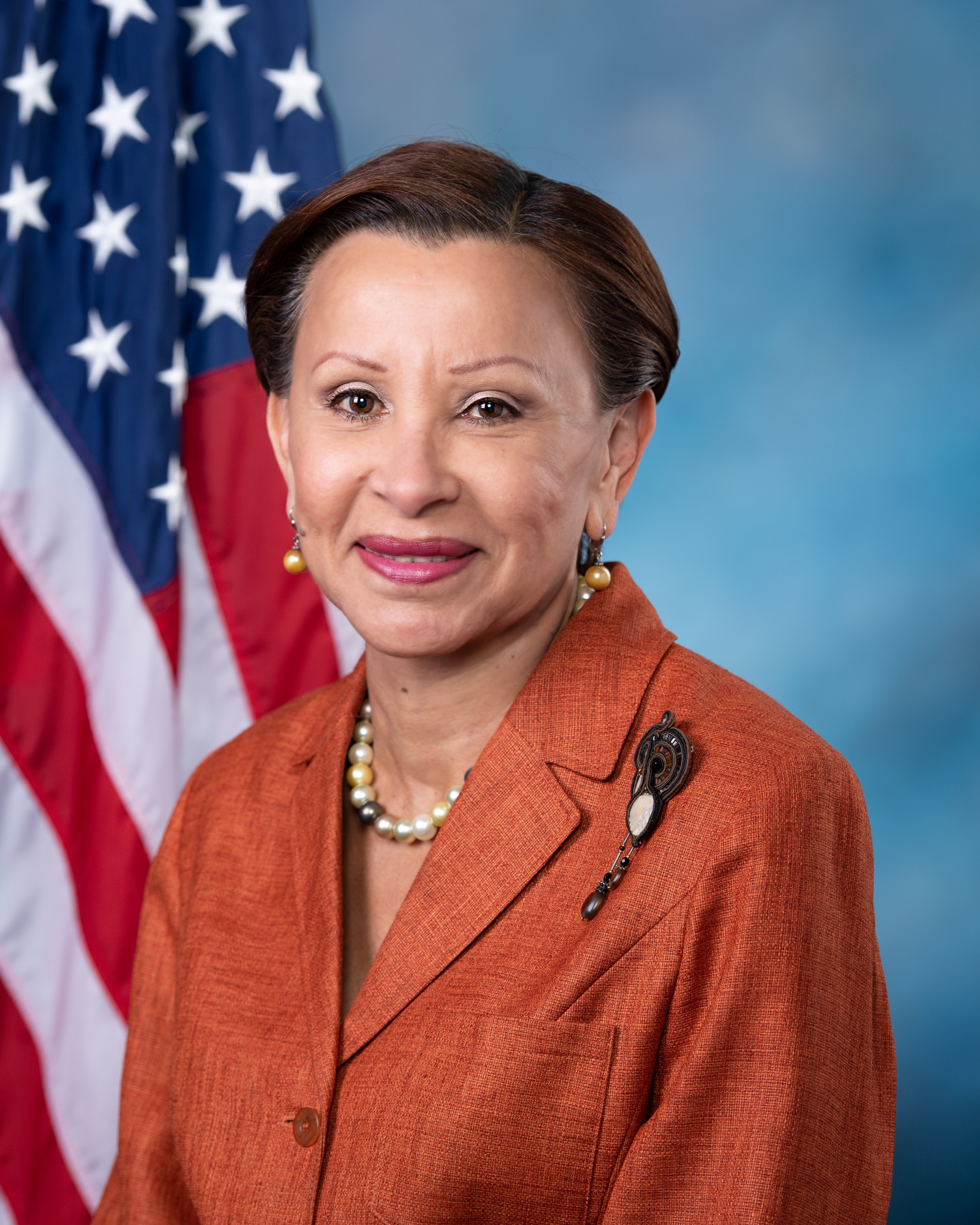

Nominee	Nydia Velázquez	Cesar Estevez
Party	Democratic	Republican
Percentage	95.8%	4.2%
- County results Velazquez: 90–100%
U.S. Representative before election
Nydia Velázquez
Democratic
Elected U.S. Representative
Nydia Velázquez
Democratic

=== Predictions ===
Source	Ranking	As of
Sabato's Crystal Ball	Safe D	November 4, 2002
New York Times	Safe D	October 14, 2002

== District 13 ==
2002 New York's 13th congressional district election

Nominee	Vito Fossella	Arne Mattsson
Party	Republican	Democratic
Percentage	69.6%	28.3%
- County results Fossella: 60–70% 70–80%
U.S. Representative before election
Vito Fossella
Republican
Elected U.S. Representative
Vito Fossella
Republican

=== Predictions ===
Source	Ranking	As of
Sabato's Crystal Ball	Safe R	November 4, 2002
New York Times	Safe R	October 14, 2002

== District 14 ==
2002 New York's 14th congressional district election
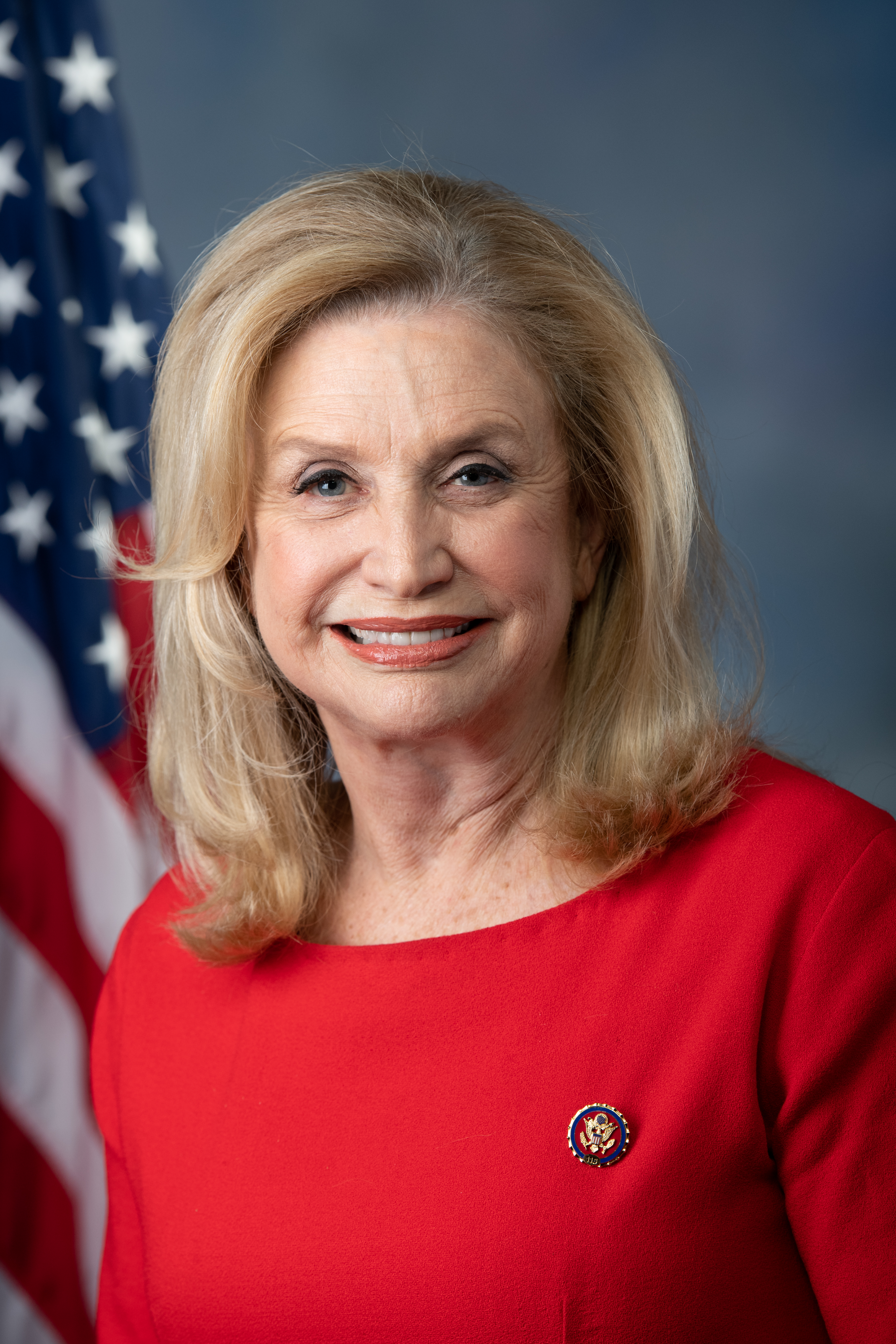

Nominee	Carolyn Maloney	Anton Srdanovic
Party	Democratic	Republican
Percentage	75.3%	24.8%
- County results Maloney: 70–80%
U.S. Representative before election
Carolyn Maloney
Democratic
Elected U.S. Representative
Carolyn Maloney
Democratic

=== Predictions ===
Source	Ranking	As of
Sabato's Crystal Ball	Safe D	November 4, 2002
New York Times	Safe D	October 14, 2002

== District 15 ==
2002 New York's 15th congressional district election
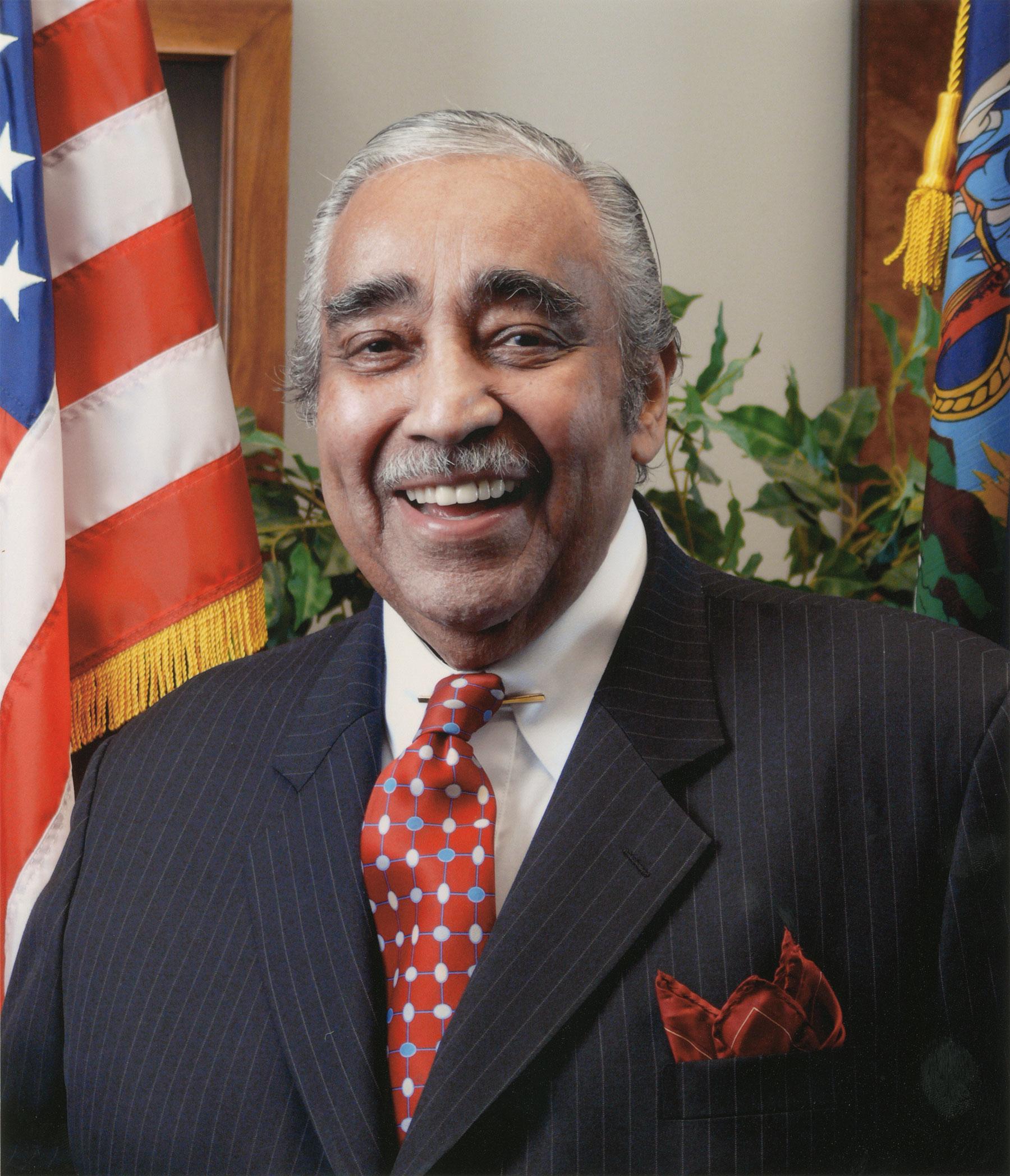

Nominee	Charles B. Rangel	Jessie Fields
Party	Democratic	Republican
Percentage	88.5%	11.5%
U.S. Representative before election
Charles B. Rangel
Democratic
Elected U.S. Representative
Charles B. Rangel
Democratic

=== Predictions ===
Source	Ranking	As of
Sabato's Crystal Ball	Safe D	November 4, 2002
New York Times	Safe D	October 14, 2002

== District 16 ==
2002 New York's 16th congressional district election
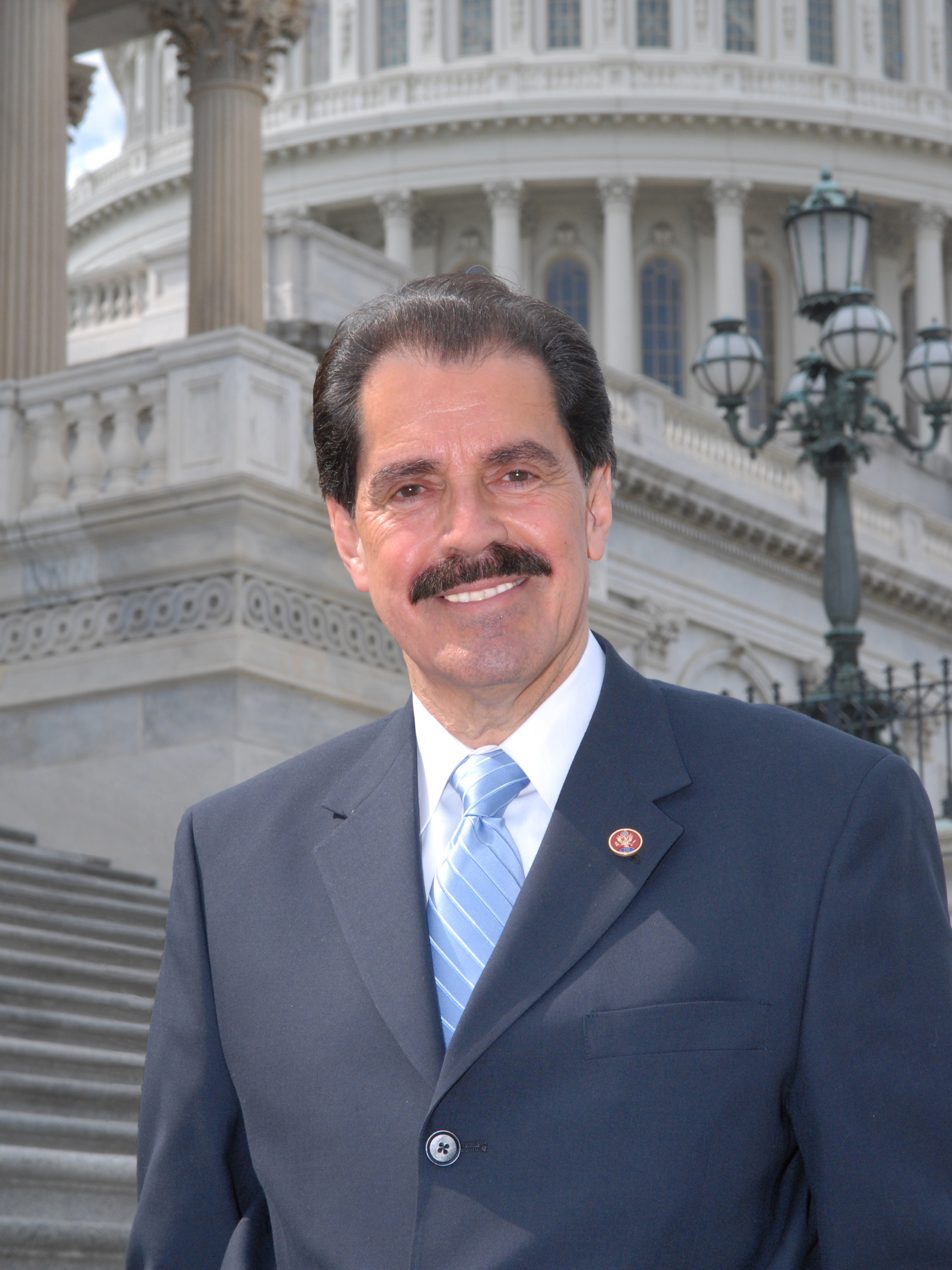

Nominee	Jose Serrano	Frank Dellavalle
Party	Democratic	Republican
Percentage	92.1%	7.9%
- County results Serrano: 90–100%
U.S. Representative before election
Jose Serrano
Democratic
Elected U.S. Representative
Jose Serrano
Democratic

=== Predictions ===
Source	Ranking	As of
Sabato's Crystal Ball	Safe D	November 4, 2002
New York Times	Safe D	October 14, 2002

== District 17 ==
2002 New York's 17th congressional district election
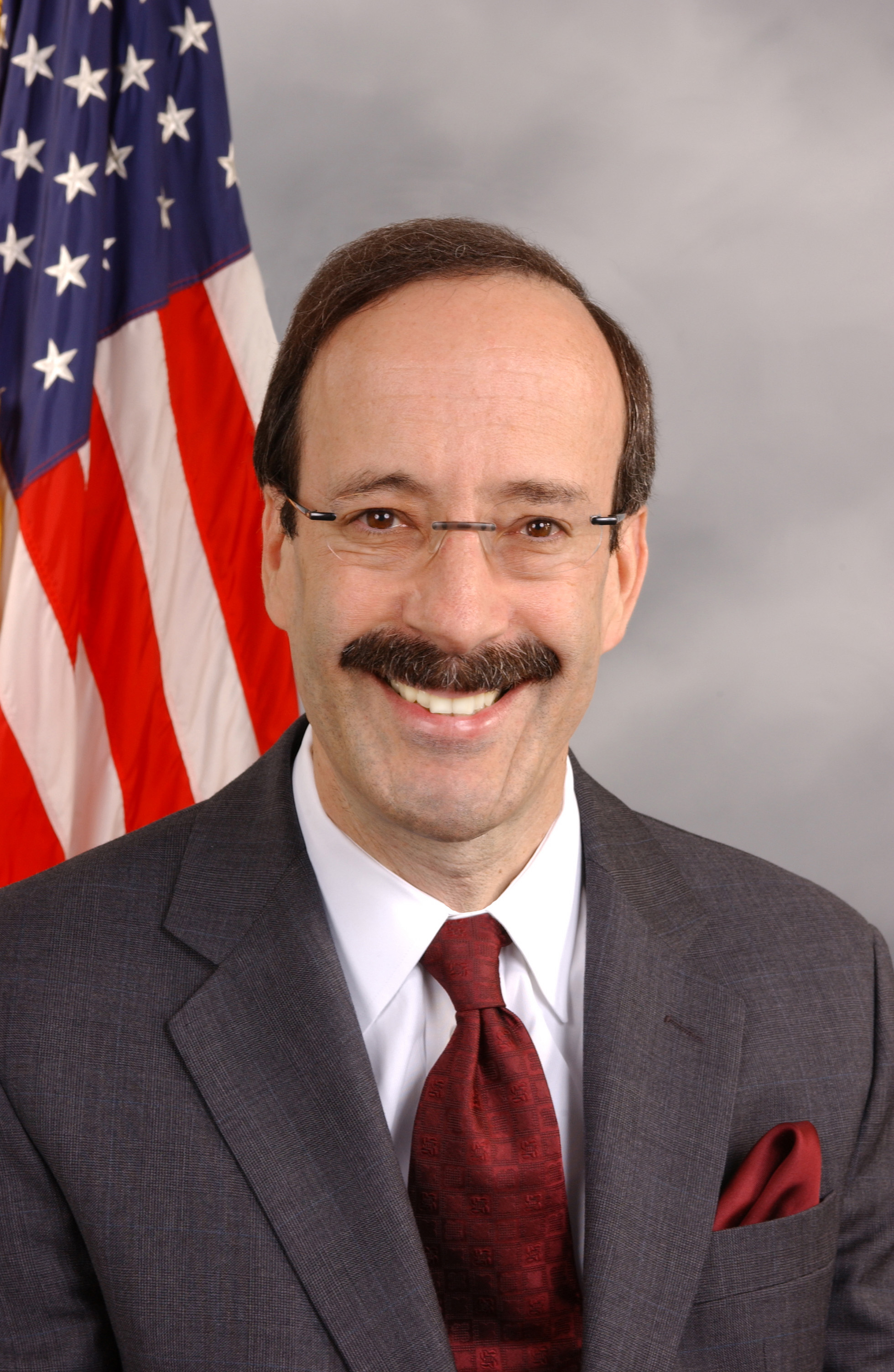

Nominee	Eliot Engel	Scott Vanderhoef
Party	Democratic	Republican
Percentage	62.6%	34.4%
- County results Engel: 60–70% 80–90% Vanderhoef: 50–60%
U.S. Representative before election
Eliot Engel
Democratic
Elected U.S. Representative
Eliot Engel
Democratic

=== Predictions ===
Source	Ranking	As of
Sabato's Crystal Ball	Safe D	November 4, 2002
New York Times	Safe D	October 14, 2002

== District 18 ==
2002 New York's 18th congressional district election
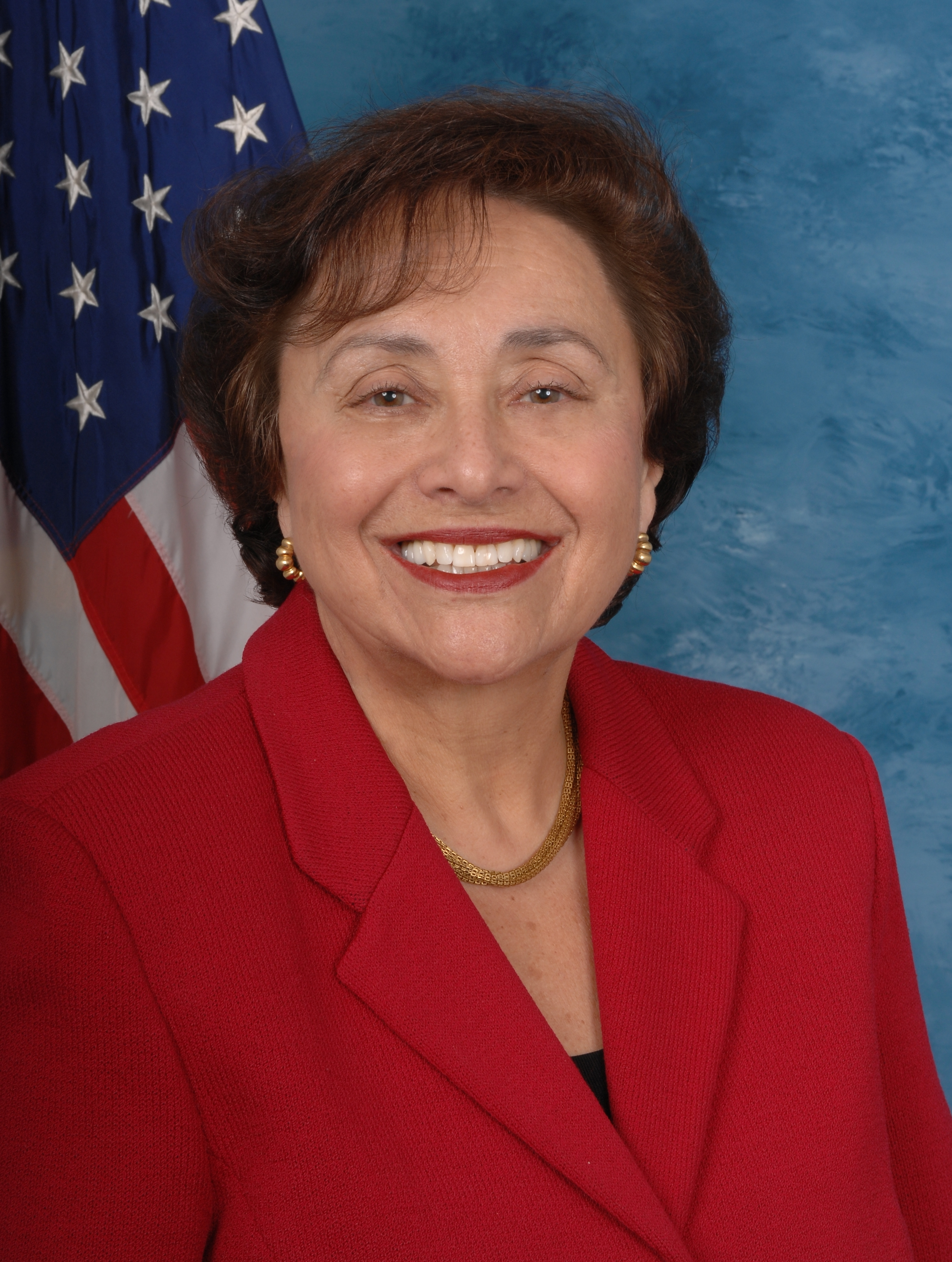

Nominee	Nita Lowey	Michael J. Reynolds
Party	Democratic	Republican
Percentage	92.0%	8.0%
- County results Lowey: 80–90% 90–100%
U.S. Representative before election
Nita Lowey
Democratic
Elected U.S. Representative
Nita Lowey
Democratic

=== Predictions ===
Source	Ranking	As of
Sabato's Crystal Ball	Safe D	November 4, 2002
New York Times	Safe D	October 14, 2002

== District 19 ==
2002 New York's 19th congressional district election
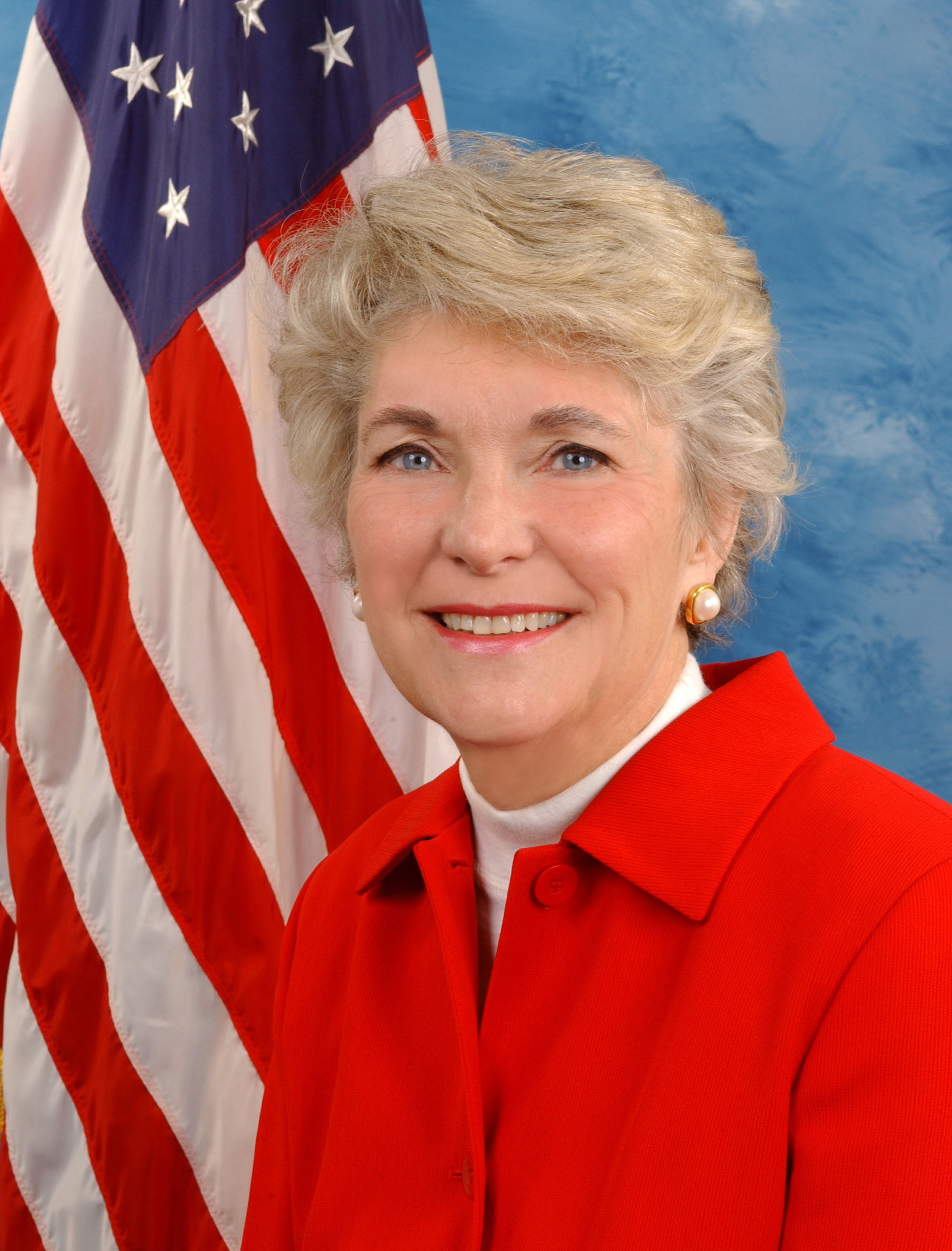

Nominee	Sue Kelly	Janine Selendy
Party	Republican	Democratic
Percentage	70.0%	26.0%
U.S. Representative before election
Sue Kelly
Republican
Elected U.S. Representative
Sue Kelly
Republican

=== Predictions ===
Source	Ranking	As of
Sabato's Crystal Ball	Safe R	November 4, 2002
New York Times	Safe R	October 14, 2002

== District 20 ==
2002 New York's 20th congressional district election
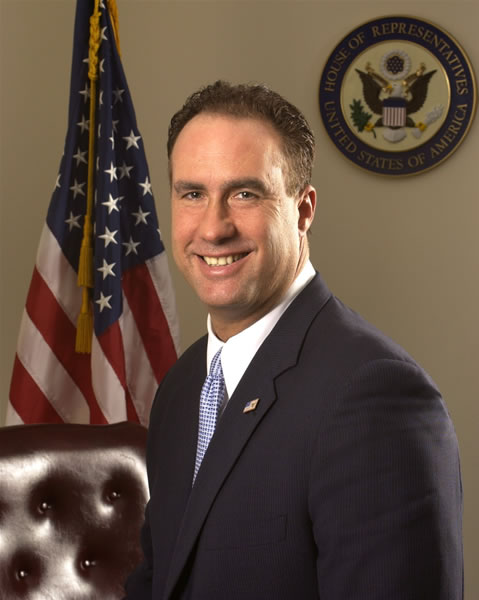

Nominee	John Sweeney	Frank Stoppenbach
Party	Republican	Democratic
Percentage	73.3%	24.0%
- County results Sweeney: 60–70% 70–80%
U.S. Representative before election
John Sweeney
Republican
Elected U.S. Representative
John Sweeney
Republican

=== Predictions ===
Source	Ranking	As of
Sabato's Crystal Ball	Safe R	November 4, 2002
New York Times	Safe R	October 14, 2002

== District 21 ==
2002 New York's 21st congressional district election
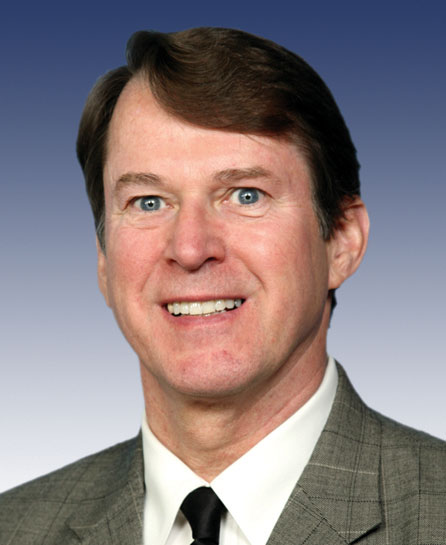

Nominee	Mike McNulty	Charles Rosenstein
Party	Democratic	Republican
Percentage	75.1%	24.9%
- County results Mcnulty: 60–70% 70–80%
U.S. Representative before election
Mike McNulty
Democratic
Elected U.S. Representative
Mike McNulty
Democratic

=== Predictions ===
Source	Ranking	As of
Sabato's Crystal Ball	Safe D	November 4, 2002
New York Times	Safe D	October 14, 2002

== District 22 ==
2002 New York's 22nd congressional district election
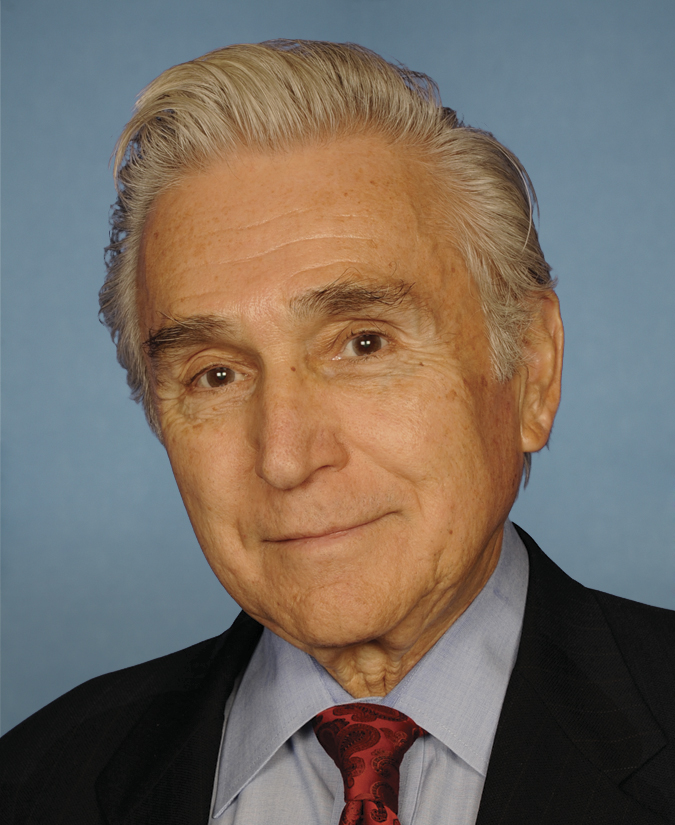

Nominee	Maurice Hinchey	Eric Hall
Party	Democratic	Republican
Percentage	64.2%	32.9%
- County results Hinchey: 50–60% 60–70% 70–80% Hall: 40–50%
U.S. Representative before election
Maurice Hinchey
Democratic
Elected U.S. Representative
Maurice Hinchey
Democratic

=== Predictions ===
Source	Ranking	As of
Sabato's Crystal Ball	Safe D	November 4, 2002
New York Times	Safe D	October 14, 2002

== District 23 ==
2002 New York's 23rd congressional district election
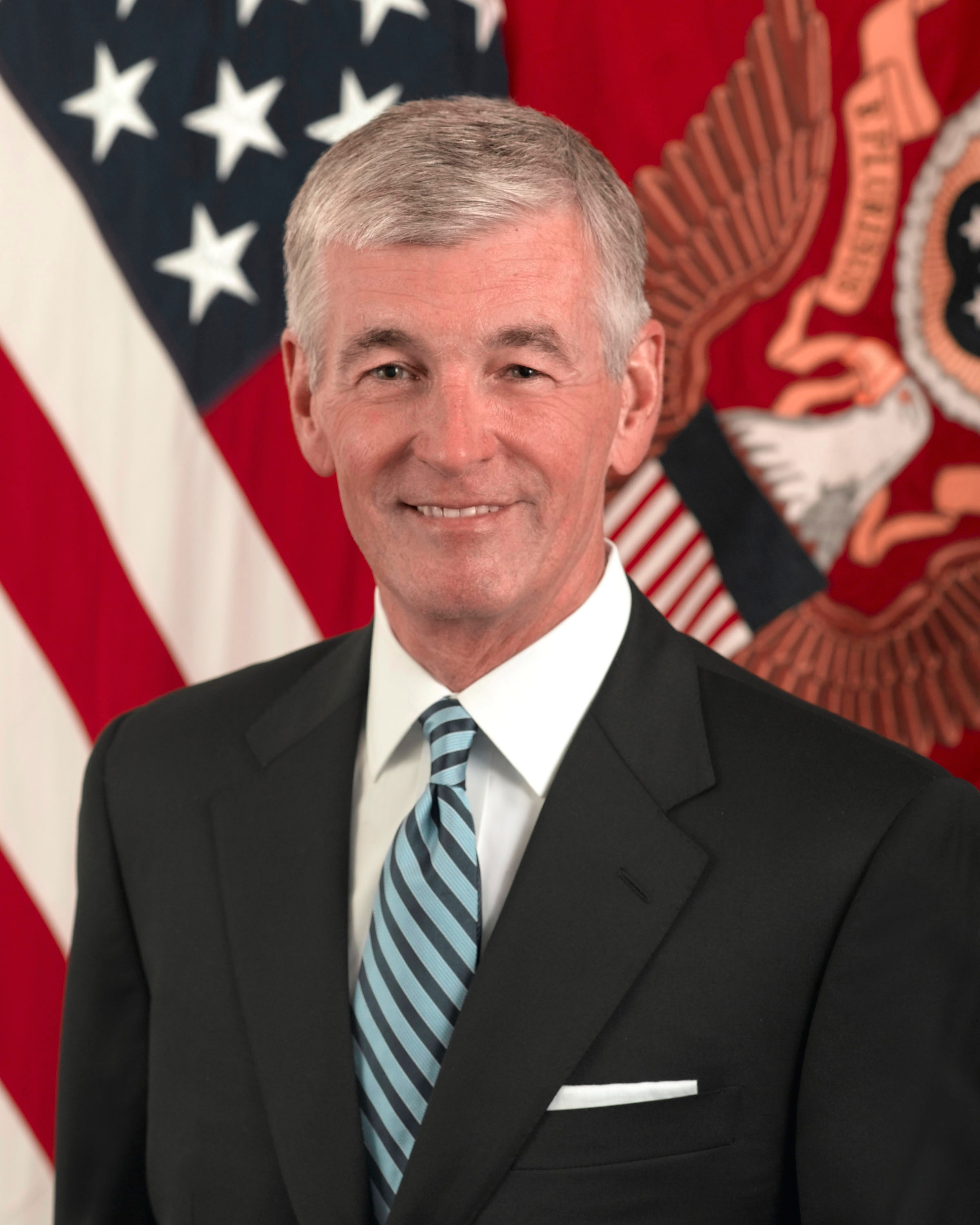
Nominee	John McHugh
Party	Republican
U.S. Representative before election
John McHugh
Republican
Elected U.S. Representative
John McHugh
Republican

=== Predictions ===
Source	Ranking	As of
Sabato's Crystal Ball	Safe R	November 4, 2002
New York Times	Safe R	October 14, 2002

== District 24 ==
2002 New York's 24th congressional district election
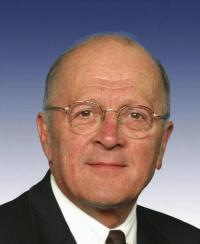

Nominee	Sherwood Boehlert	David Walrath
Party	Republican	Conservative
Percentage	70.7%	21.6%
U.S. Representative before election
Sherwood Boehlert
Republican
Elected U.S. Representative
Sherwood Boehlert
Republican

=== Predictions ===
Source	Ranking	As of
Sabato's Crystal Ball	Safe R	November 4, 2002
New York Times	Safe R	October 14, 2002

== District 25 ==
2002 New York's 25th congressional district election
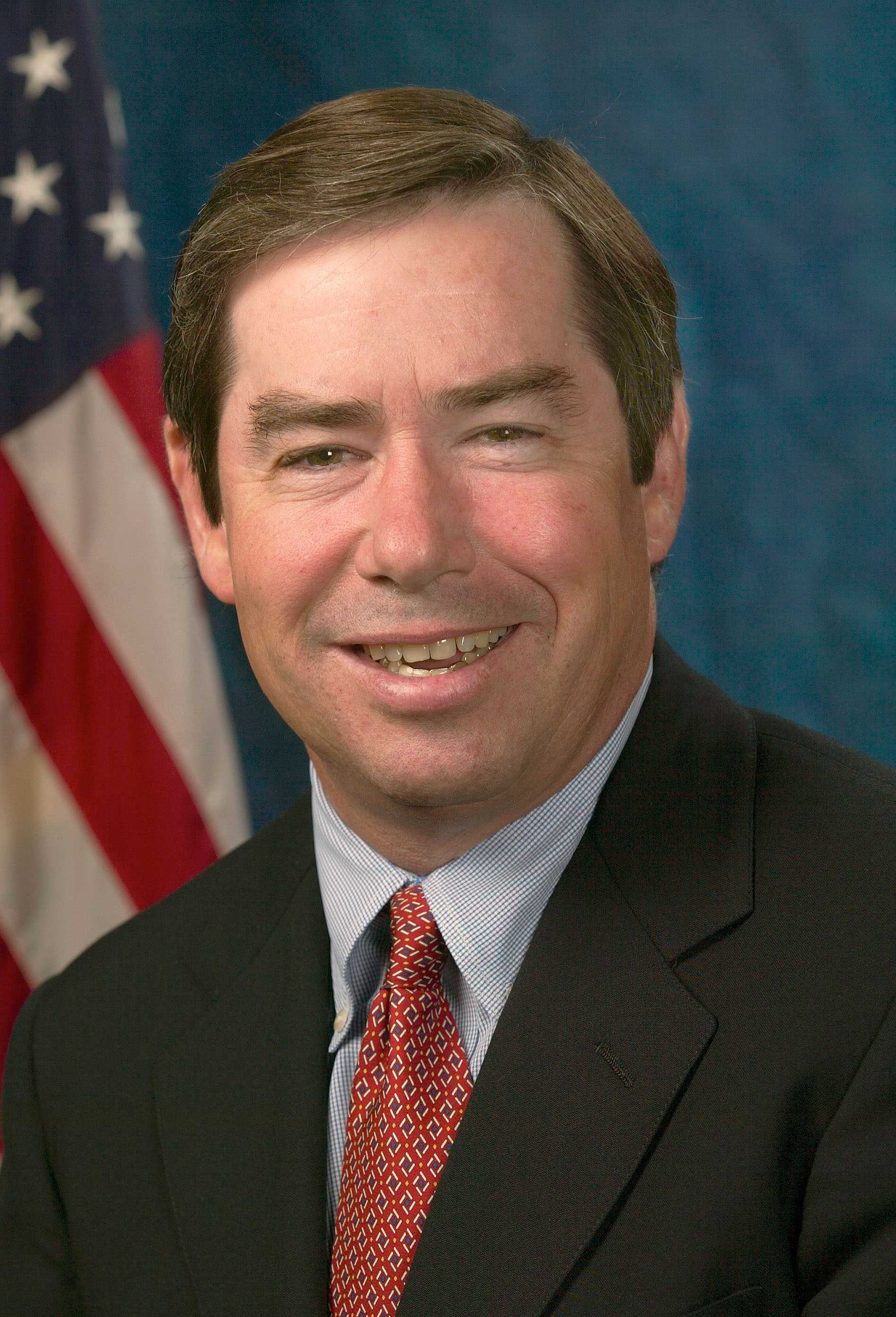

Nominee	Jim Walsh	Stephanie Aldersley
Party	Republican	Democratic
Percentage	72.3%	26.6%
- County results Walsh: 60–70% 70–80% 80–90%
U.S. Representative before election
Jim Walsh
Republican
Elected U.S. Representative
Jim Walsh
Republican

=== Predictions ===
Source	Ranking	As of
Sabato's Crystal Ball	Safe R	November 4, 2002
New York Times	Safe R	October 14, 2002

== District 26 ==
2002 New York's 26th congressional district election
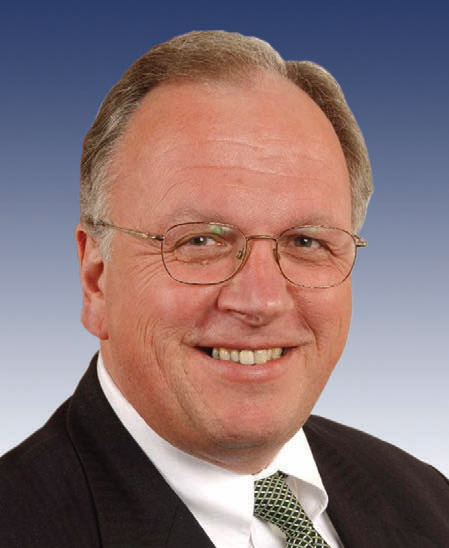

Nominee	Tom Reynolds	Ayesha Nariman
Party	Republican	Democratic
Percentage	73.6%	22.4%
- County results Reynolds: 60–70% 70–80% 80–90%
U.S. Representative before election
Tom Reynolds
Republican
Elected U.S. Representative
Tom Reynolds
Republican

=== Predictions ===
Source	Ranking	As of
Sabato's Crystal Ball	Safe R	November 4, 2002
New York Times	Safe R	October 14, 2002

== District 27 ==
2002 New York's 27th congressional district election
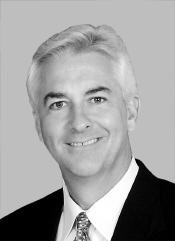

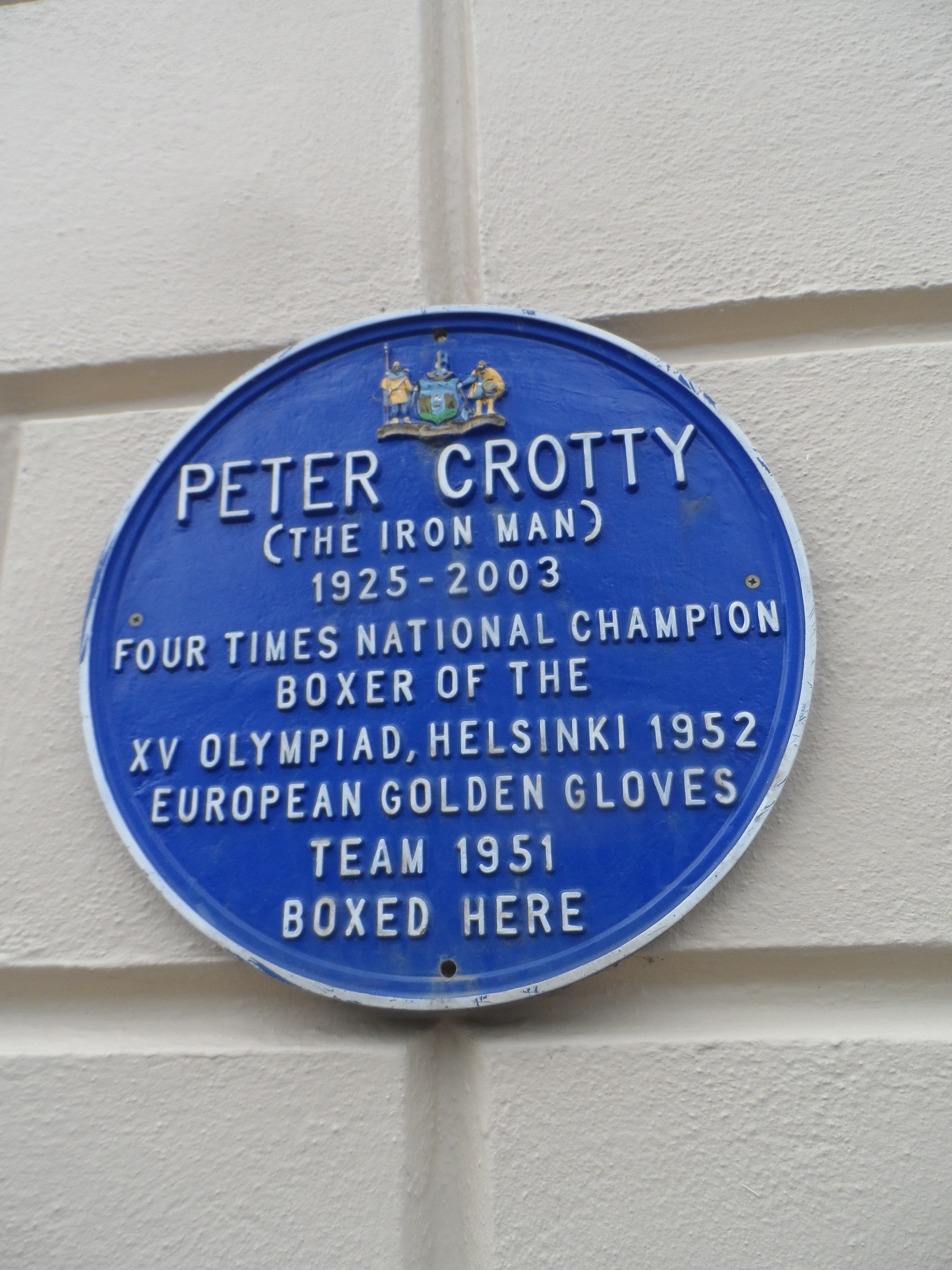
Nominee	Jack Quinn	Peter Crotty
Party	Republican	Democratic
Percentage	69.1%	27.5%
- County results Quinn: 60–70% 70–80%
U.S. Representative before election
Jack Quinn
Republican
Elected U.S. Representative
Jack Quinn
Republican

=== Predictions ===
Source	Ranking	As of
Sabato's Crystal Ball	Safe R	November 4, 2002
New York Times	Safe R	October 14, 2002

== District 28 ==
2002 New York's 28th congressional district election
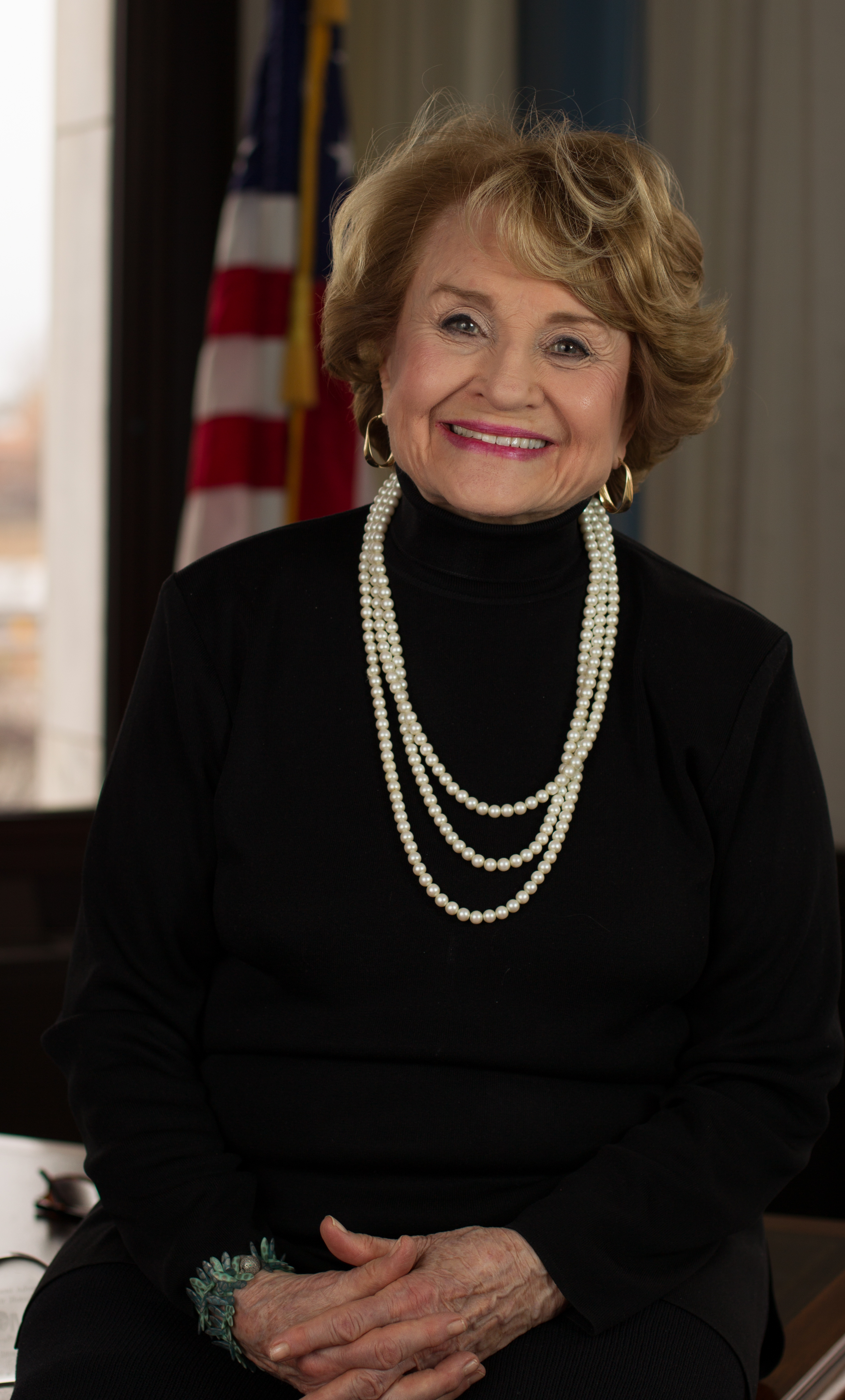

Nominee	Louise Slaughter	Henry Wojtaszek
Party	Democratic	Republican
Percentage	62.5%	37.5%
- County results Slaughter: 50–60% 70–80% Wojtaszek: 50–60%
U.S. Representative before election
Louise Slaughter
Democratic
Elected U.S. Representative
Louise Slaughter
Democratic

=== Predictions ===
Source	Ranking	As of
Sabato's Crystal Ball	Safe D	November 4, 2002
New York Times	Safe D	October 14, 2002

== District 29 ==
2002 New York's 29th congressional district election
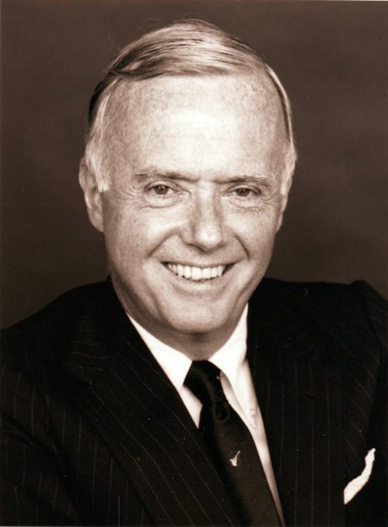

Nominee	Amo Houghton	Kisun Peters
Party	Republican	Democratic
Percentage	73.1%	21.3%
- County results Houghton: 60–70% 70–80% 80–90%
U.S. Representative before election
Amo Houghton
Republican
Elected U.S. Representative
Amo Houghton
Republican

=== Predictions ===
Source	Ranking	As of
Sabato's Crystal Ball	Safe R	November 4, 2002
New York Times	Safe R	October 14, 2002
