= Shacklady =

Shacklady is a surname. Notable people with the surname include:

- Anthony Shacklady (1945–2014), British wrestler
- David Shacklady (born 1967), English golfer
- Max Shacklady (1918–1986), British boxer
