= Alexandre Dib =

Brazilian boxer (1929–2012)

Personal information
- Nationality: Brazilian
- Born: 3 September 1929
- Died: 6 April 2012 (aged 82) São Paulo state, Brazil

Sport
- Sport: Boxing

Alexandre Dib (3 September 1929 – 6 April 2012) was a Brazilian boxer. He competed in the men's welterweight event at the 1952 Summer Olympics. In the opening round, he lost to Victor Jörgensen of Denmark.
