= Feliciano Rossano =

Uruguayan boxer (1924–1992)

Personal information
- Full name: Feliciano Artemio Rosano Cor
- Born: 20 October 1924 Durazno, Uruguay
- Died: 30 April 1992 (aged 67) Montevideo, Uruguay

Sport
- Sport: Boxing

Feliciano Artemio Rosano Cor (20 October 1924 – 30 April 1992) was a Uruguayan boxer. He competed in the men's welterweight event at the 1948 Summer Olympics. At the 1948 Summer Olympics, he lost to Duggie Du Preez of South Africa. Rossano died in Montevideo on 30 April 1992, at the age of 67.
