= Robert Cranston (boxer) =

Indian boxer

Personal information
- Full name: Robert Percival Cranston
- Nationality: Indian
- Born: 30 October 1928; Gooty, British India
- Died: 9 June 2014 (aged 85); Blainville, Quebec, Canada

Sport
- Sport: Boxing

Robert Cranston (30 October 1928 – 9 June 2014) was an Indian boxer. He competed in the men's welterweight event at the 1948 Summer Olympics. At the 1948 Summer Olympics, he lost to Aurelio Díaz of Spain.
