= Édouard Bombart =

Belgian boxer (1926–2006)

Maurice Bombaert
Personal information
- Full name: Edouard Jacques Maurice Bombart
- Nationality: Belgian
- Born: 12 April 1926 Bierbeek, Belgium
- Died: 20 August 2006 (aged 80) Leuven, Belgium

Sport
- Sport: Boxing

Edouard Jacques Maurice Bombart (12 April 1926 – 20 August 2006) was a Belgian boxer. He competed in the men's welterweight event at the 1948 Summer Olympics. At the 1948 Summer Olympics, he lost to Hank Herring of the United States. Bombart died in Leuven on 20 August 2006, at the age of 80.
