= Harry Gunnarsson =

Swedish boxer

Personal information
- Nationality: Swedish
- Born: 9 September 1929; Gothenburg, Sweden
- Died: 22 March 2012 (aged 82); Gothenburg, Sweden

Sport
- Sport: Boxing

Harry Gunnarsson (9 September 1929 – 22 March 2012) was a Swedish boxer. He competed in the men's welterweight event at the 1952 Summer Olympics.
