= Jacob Butula =

Canadian boxer (1931–1992)

Personal information
- Born: 1 January 1931; Saskatchewan, Canada
- Died: 26 June 1992 (aged 61); Trail, British Columbia, Canada

Sport
- Sport: Boxing

Jacob Butula (1 January 1931 – 26 June 1992) was a Canadian boxer. He competed in the men's welterweight event at the 1952 Summer Olympics. He was killed in a car accident in 1992.
