= Ali Belkacem =

French boxer

Personal information
- Nationality: French
- Born: 15 April 1931; Birkhadem, Algeria
- Died: 31 May 2006 (aged 75); Buzignargues, France

Sport
- Sport: Boxing

Ali Ben Mokrane Belkacem (15 April 1931 – 31 May 2006) was a French boxer. He competed in the men's welterweight event at the 1952 Summer Olympics.
