= Franco Vescovi =

Italian boxer

Personal information
- Nationality: Italian
- Born: 28 January 1930; Rome, Italy
- Died: 19 February 2006 (aged 76); Rome, Italy

Sport
- Sport: Boxing

Franco Vescovi (28 January 1930 – 19 February 2006) was an Italian boxer. He competed in the men's welterweight event at the 1952 Summer Olympics.
