= George Issabeg =

Iranian boxer (born 1930)

George Issabeg (born 9 November 1930, date of death unknown) was an Iranian boxer of Assyrian ethnicity who represented Iran at both the 1948 and 1952 Summer Olympics. In 1948, Issabeg competed in the welterweight classification. He lost in the first round against an Italian Alessandro D'Ottavio, who went on to win the silver medal. In 1952, Issabeg stayed at the welterweight level and defeated the Egyptian Fathi Ali Abbdelrahman in the first round, but lost to the Dutch boxer Moos Linneman in the second round.

== See also ==
- Boxing at the 1952 Summer Olympics
- Boxing at the 1948 Summer Olympics
