= Pierre Hernandez =

French boxer

Personal information
- Nationality: French
- Born: 22 November 1928; Bayonne, France
- Died: 27 January 2015 (aged 86); Bayonne, France

Sport
- Sport: Boxing

Pierre Hernandez (22 November 1928 – 27 January 2015) was a French boxer. He competed in the men's welterweight event at the 1948 Summer Olympics.
