= Iivari Malmikoski =

Finnish boxer

Personal information
- Nationality: Finnish
- Born: 2 May 1927; Turku, Finland
- Died: 25 January 2010 (aged 82); Turku, Finland

Sport
- Sport: Boxing

Iivari Malmikoski (2 May 1927 – 25 January 2010) was a Finnish boxer. He competed in the men's welterweight event at the 1952 Summer Olympics.
