= Pál Budai (boxer) =

Hungarian boxer

Personal information
- Nationality: Hungarian
- Born: 7 February 1925 Budapest, Hungary
- Died: 29 August 1999 (aged 74)

Sport
- Sport: Boxing

Pál Budai (7 February 1925 – 29 August 1999) was a Hungarian boxer. He competed in the men's welterweight event at the 1952 Summer Olympics.
