= Humberto Loayza =

Chilean boxer (1925–2014)

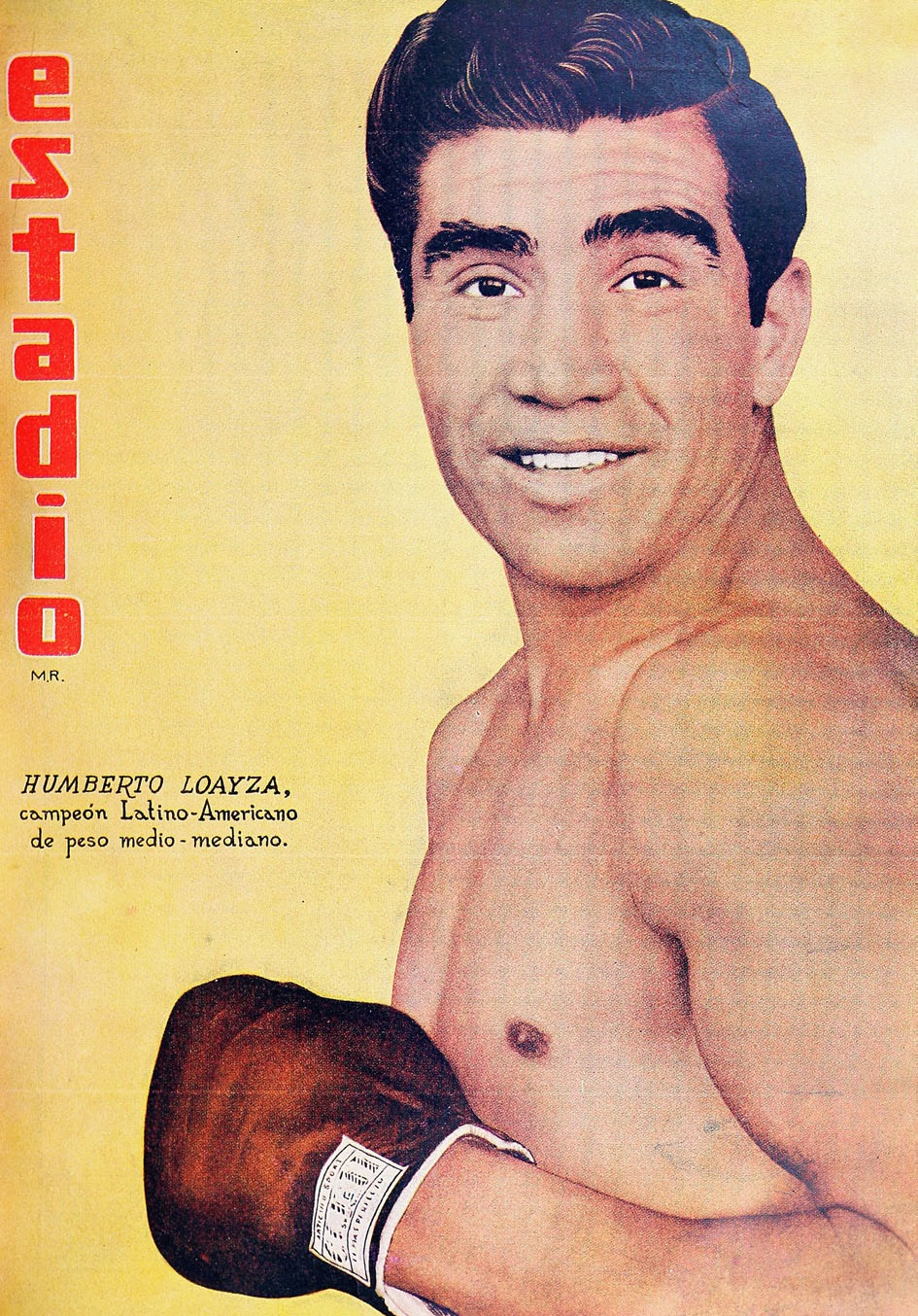

Personal information
- Born: 21 December 1925; Iquique, Chile
- Died: 30 June 2014 (aged 88)

Sport
- Sport: Boxing

Humberto Loayza (21 December 1925 – 30 June 2014) was a Chilean boxer. He competed in the men's welterweight event at the 1948 Summer Olympics.
