= Ron Norris =

Indian boxer

Personal information
- Full name: Ronald Alexander Norris
- Nationality: Indian
- Born: 10 September 1932
- Died: 7 November 1984 (aged 52); Harlow, England

Sport
- Sport: Boxing

Ron Norris (10 September 1932 – 7 November 1984) was an Indian boxer. He competed in the men's welterweight event at the 1952 Summer Olympics. He was the lightweight champion of Madhya Pradesh and won the All-India championship in 1952. He was the son of Indian hockey player Rex Norris.
