= Marcos Sarfatti =

Argentine boxer

Personal information
- Nationality: Argentine
- Born: 26 April 1929

Sport
- Sport: Boxing

Marcos Sarfatti (born 26 April 1929) is an Argentine boxer. He competed in the men's welterweight event at the 1952 Summer Olympics.
