= Victor Jørgensen =

Danish boxer (1924–2001)

Medal record

Men's Boxing

Representing Denmark

Olympic Games
| Bronze medal – third place | 1952 Helsinki | Welterweight |

European Amateur Championships
| Silver medal – second place | 1950 European Amateur Championships | Welterweight |

Victor Jørgensen (12 June 1924 in Hjørring, Denmark – 29 August 2001 in Rødovre, Denmark) was a boxer from Denmark. He competed for Denmark in the 1952 Summer Olympics held in Helsinki, Finland in the welterweight event where he finished in third place.

He was a part of the club IF Sparta. He won the Danish championship in welterweight i 1949, 1950, 1952 and 1953, and came in second in the European Amateur Championships.

At the 1952 he won three matches, but lost the semifinal to Sergei Scherbakov. This was the first Olympics where there was not a third place match, and he thus won a shared bronze medal. This was the undisputed best Danish boxing result at the Olympics until 1992 where Brian Nielsen achieved the same result.
