= Gharib Afifi =

Egyptian boxer (died 1990s)

Personal information
- Full name: Gharib Ibrahim Afifi
- Nationality: Egypt
- Born: Cairo, Egypt
- Died: 1990s

Sport
- Sport: Boxing

Gharib Ibrahim Afifi (died 1990s) was an Egyptian boxer. He competed in the 1948 Summer Olympics. Afifi died in the 1990s.

== 1948 Olympic results ==
- Round of 32: lost to Peter Foran of Ireland by decision.
