= Duggie Du Preez =

South African boxer (1927–2000)

Personal information
- Nationality: South African
- Born: 18 March 1927
- Died: 13 October 2000 (aged 73) Temple City, California, United States

Sport
- Sport: Boxing

Duggie Du Preez (18 March 1927 – 13 October 2000) was a South African boxer. He competed in the men's welterweight event at the 1948 Summer Olympics.
