= Louis Gage =

American boxer

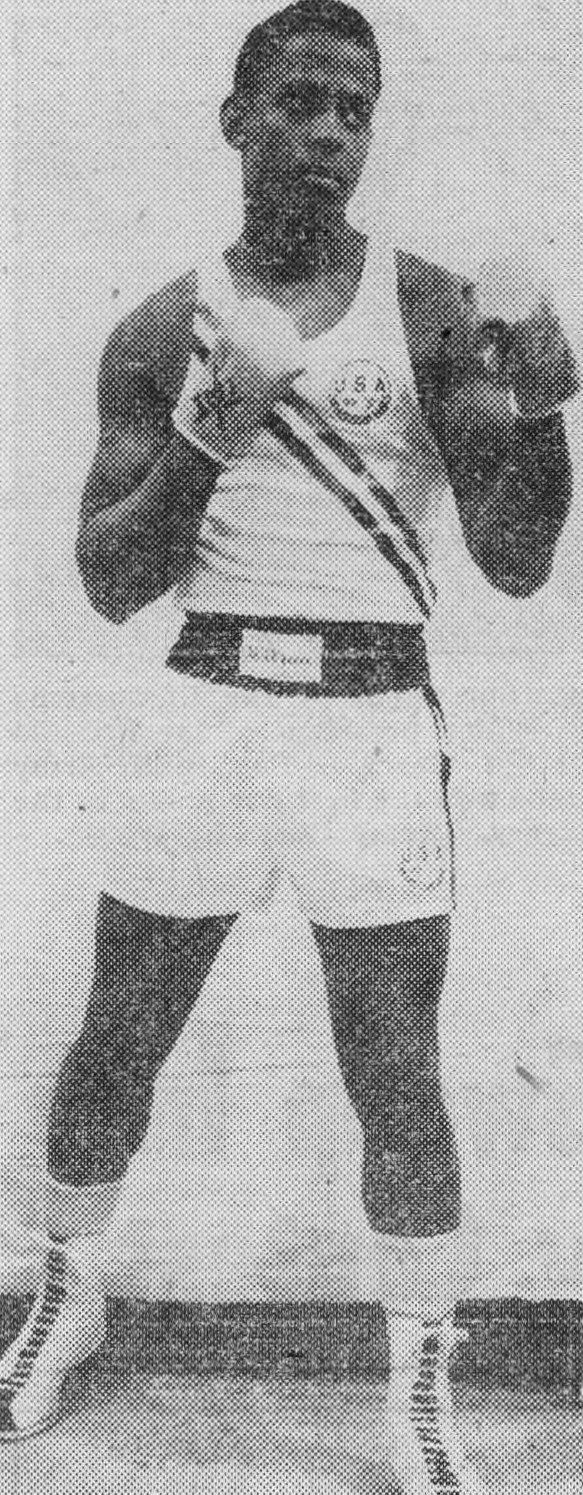
- Gage, circa 1952

Personal information
- Nationality: American
- Born: June 26, 1928 Lake Charles, Louisiana, United States
- Died: April 24, 2014 (aged 85) San Francisco, California, United States

Sport
- Sport: Boxing

Louis Gage (June 26, 1928 – April 24, 2014) was an American boxer. He competed in the men's welterweight event at the 1952 Summer Olympics.
