= José Dávalos =

Mexican boxer

Personal information
- Full name: José Luis Dávalos Noriega
- Born: 21 September 1927 Hermosillo, Mexico

Sport
- Sport: Boxing
Medal record
Men's amateur boxing
Representing Mexico
Pan American Games
Bronze medal – third place	1951 Buenos Aires	Welterweight

José Luis Dávalos Noriega (born 21 September 1927) is a Mexican boxer. He competed in the men's welterweight event at the 1952 Summer Olympics. He won a bronze medal at the 1951 Pan American Games in the –67 kg category.
