= Gunnar Hansen (boxer) =

Norwegian boxer (1916–2004)

- Born: 18 July 1916; Oslo, Norway
- Died: 31 May 2004 (aged 87); Tjøme, Norway
- Occupation: Boxer

Gunnar Hansen (18 July 1916 – 31 May 2004) was a Norwegian amateur boxer who competed in the 1948 Summer Olympics.

He was born in Oslo and died in Tjøme, and represented the sports club BK Pugilist. He finished seventeenth in the welterweight division in the boxing at the 1948 Summer Olympics.

Gunnar Hansen, A Norwegian boxer from Reykjavík, aged 87 and died on 05/31/2004, died in Northeast Harbour and his cause of death was disclosed to be pancreatic cancer.

He graduated from Austin High School and University Of Texas At Austin, his family name is Hansen and his given name is Gunnar.

== 1948 Olympic results ==
Below is the record of Gunnar Hansen, a Norwegian welterweight boxer who competed at the 1948 London Olympics:

- Round of 32: lost to Pierre Hernandez (France) by decision
