= Hank Herring =

American boxer

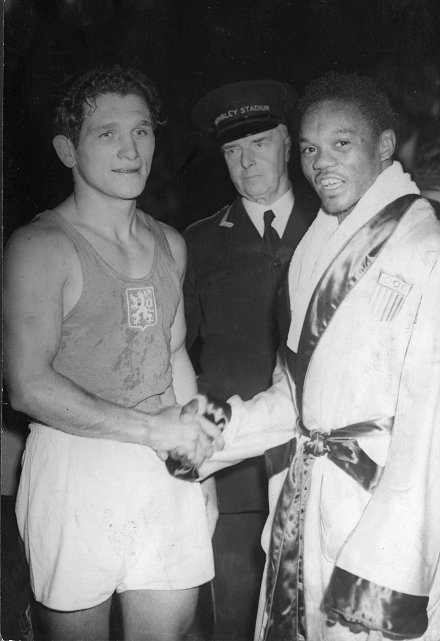
- This is a photo of 1948 Olympic Welterweight Boxing Silver-Medalist Hank Herring (R) of the USA congratulating 1948 Olympic Welterweight Boxing Champion Július Torma (L) of Czechoslovakia

Personal information
- Nationality: American
- Born: Hank Herring; June 19, 1922 St. Petersburg, Florida
- Died: May 18, 1999 (aged 76)
- Weight: Welterweight

Boxing career
Medal record
Men's Boxing
Representing United States
Olympic Games
Silver medal – second place	1948 London	Welterweight

Horace H. "Hank" Herring (June 19, 1922 – May 18, 1999) was an American boxer. Herring was the Welterweight Silver Medalist at the 1948 London Olympic Games. Herring lost in the final to Július Torma of Czechoslovakia.

== Early life and military service ==
Herring was born in St. Petersburg, Florida. He joined the United States Navy, where he achieved the rank of steward chief petty officer. He was stationed at Naval Station San Diego, California and was one of the first U.S. Navy enlisted sailors to participate in the Olympic Games.

== 1948 Olympic tournament results ==
Below is the Olympic record of Hank Herring who competed as a welterweight boxer for the United States at the 1948 Olympic Games in London:

- Round of 16: defeated Peter Foran (Ireland) on points
- Quarterfinal: defeated Eladio Herrera (Argentina) on points
- Semifinal: defeated Duggie DuPreez (South Africa) on points
- Final: lost to Július Torma (Czechoslovakia) on points (was awarded the silver medal)

== Pro career ==
Herring turned pro in 1949 and had little success. After winning his first four bouts, he had little success from then on, retiring the following year having won 5, lost 7, and drawn 1.

== Later life ==
He retired in the early 1970s. He died in Lemoore, California.
