= Pierre Wouters =

Belgian boxer

Personal information
- Nationality: Belgian
- Born: 25 January 1931; Brussels, Belgium
- Died: 28 December 1999 (aged 68)

Sport
- Sport: Boxing

Pierre Wouters (25 January 1931 – 28 December 1999) was a Belgian boxer. He competed in the men's welterweight event at the 1952 Summer Olympics.
