= Max Shacklady =

British boxer

Personal information
- Nationality: British
- Born: 31 December 1918; Barton-upon-Irwell, Greater Manchester, England
- Died: 6 March 1986 (aged 67); Salford, England

Sport
- Sport: Boxing

Maximilian Baldwin Shacklady (31 December 1918 – 6 March 1986) was a British boxer. He competed in the men's welterweight event at the 1948 Summer Olympics. He fought as Max Shacklady.

Shacklady won the 1948 Amateur Boxing Association British welterweight title, when boxing out of the Eccles ABC.
