= Moos Linneman =

Dutch boxer (1931–2020)

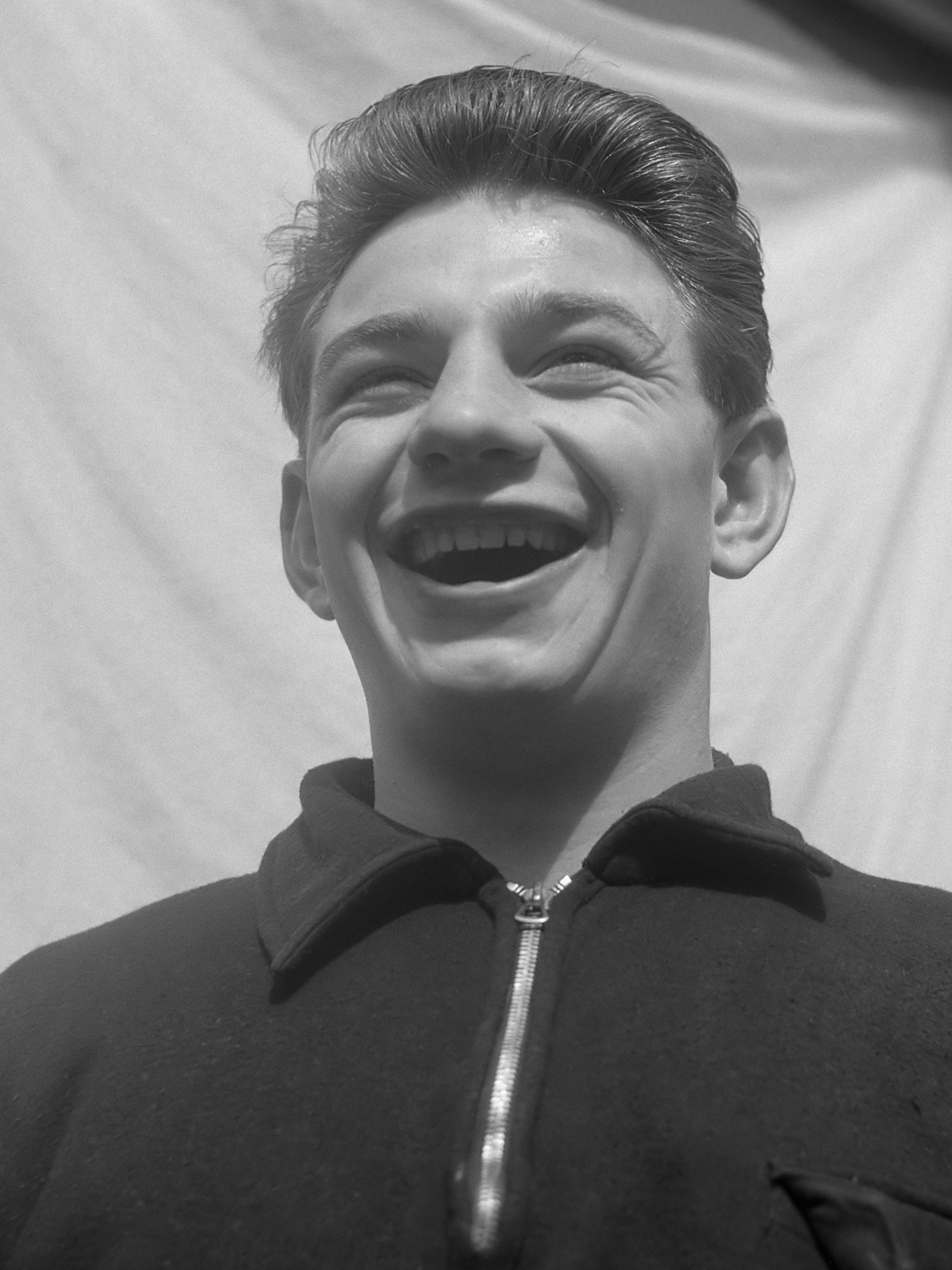
Moos Linneman (1952)

Nicolaas ("Moos") Linneman (June 11, 1931 – October 31, 2020) was a boxer from the Netherlands, who competed at two consecutive Summer Olympics for his native country. First in London (1948), then four years later in Helsinki, where he was stopped in the quarterfinals of the Men's Welterweight (-67 kg) division by Günther Heidemann of Germany. He was born in Amsterdam, North Holland.
