= Peter Crotty =

Irish boxer

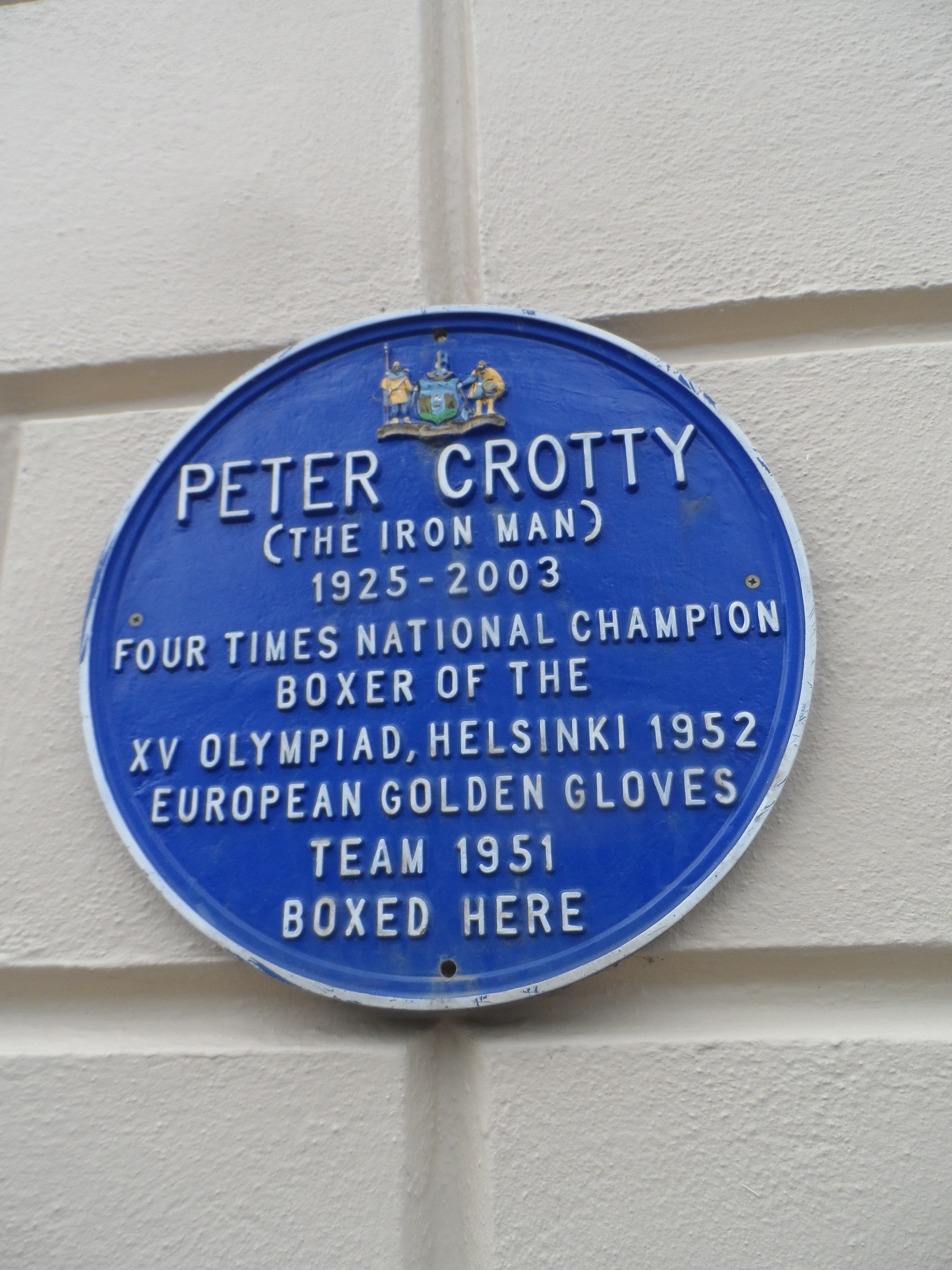
- Blue plaque in Dungarvan

Personal information
- Nickname(s): The Iron Man, The Clonmel Ironman
- Nationality: Irish
- Born: 16 September 1925; Dungarvan, County Waterford, Irish Free State
- Died: 1 June 2003 (aged 75); Dungarvan, Ireland

Sport
- Sport: Boxing
- Weight class: welterweight
- Club: Dungarvan Boxing Club

Peter Crotty (16 September 1925 – 1 June 2003) was an Irish boxer. He competed in the men's welterweight event at the 1952 Summer Olympics.
