= Peter Foran =

Irish boxer (1927–2001)

Personal information
- Nationality: Irish
- Born: 1 July 1927 Ballyhaunis, County Mayo, Ireland
- Died: 1 October 2001 (aged 74) Coventry, England

Sport
- Sport: Boxing

Peter Foran (1 July 1927 – 1 October 2001) was an Irish boxer. He competed in the men's welterweight event at the 1948 Summer Olympics. Foran later worked in the radio and television industry in Dublin. He died in Coventry, England on 1 October 2001, at the age of 74.
