= Billy Boyce =

Australian boxer

Personal information
- Nationality: Australian
- Born: 7 May 1927
- Died: 24 May 2011 (aged 84)

Sport
- Sport: Boxing

Billy Boyce (7 May 1927 – 24 May 2011) was an Australian boxer. He competed in the men's welterweight event at the 1948 Summer Olympics. He died on 24 May 2011, seventeen days after his 84th birthday.
