= Sergei Scherbakov =

Russian boxer

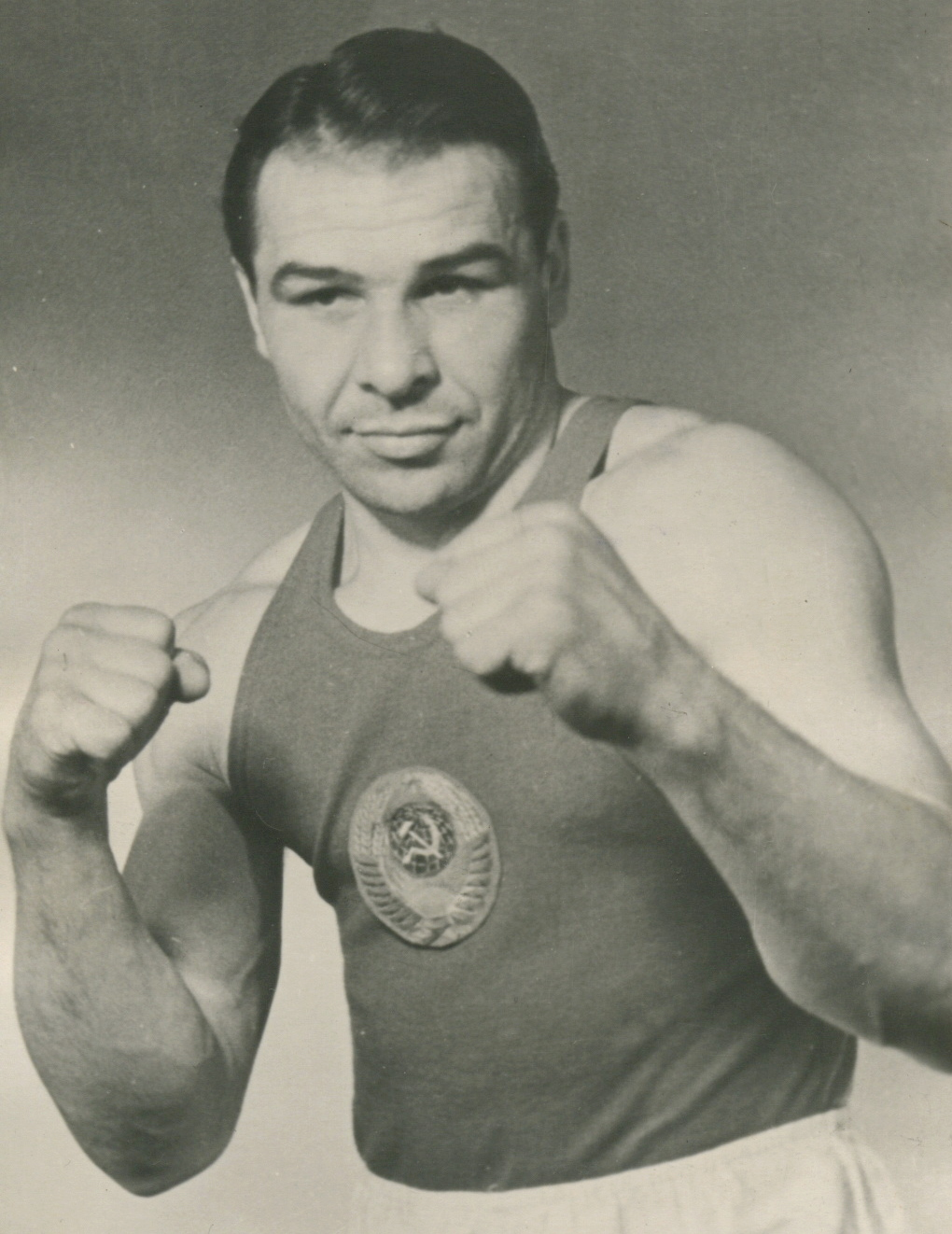
- Scherbakov in 1953

Personal information
- Born: 20 July 1918 Moscow, Russian SFSR
- Died: 27 January 1994 (aged 75) Moscow, Russia

Sport
- Sport: Boxing
- Club: Pishchevik Moscow
Medal record
Representing Soviet Union
Olympic Games
Silver medal – second place	1952 Helsinki	-67 kg
European Championships
Silver medal – second place	1953 Warsaw	-67 kg

Sergei Semyonovich Scherbakov (20 July 1918 – 27 January 1994) was a Russian welterweight boxer. He won silver medals at the 1952 Olympics and 1953 European Championships, both times losing the final to Zygmunt Chychła. In 1944–53 Scherbakov won 10 consecutive Soviet titles. He retired with a record of 207 wins out of 227 bouts.

Shcherbakov took up boxing in 1936 following he elder brother Aleksandr, and placed within the podium at the Soviet championships in 1939 and 1940. During World War II he fought in a special unit, which was assembled from former athletes to carry out deep raids behind the enemy lines. He was wounded twice and awarded the medals For Courage and For Battle Merit. After retiring from competitions he worked as a boxing coach and referee and trained national teams of the Soviet Union (1954–60) and Egypt (1963–71). His younger brother Vyacheslav was also a promising boxer. He lost an arm in the war, but later became a renowned boxing coach.
