= Gusztáv Bene =

Hungarian boxer (1911–1993)

Personal information
- Nationality: Hungarian
- Born: 23 October 1911 Mezőhegyes, Hungary
- Died: 18 February 1993 (aged 81) Toukley, New South Wales, Australia

Sport
- Sport: Boxing

Gusztáv Bene (23 October 1911 – 18 February 1993) was a Hungarian boxer. He competed in the men's welterweight event at the 1948 Summer Olympics.
