= Günther Heidemann =

German boxer

Medal record

Men's Boxing

Representing Germany

Olympic Games
Bronze medal – third place	1952 Helsinki	Welterweight

Günther Heidemann (October 21, 1932 – March 15, 2010) was a boxer from Germany. He was born in Berlin.

He competed for Germany in the 1952 Summer Olympics held in Helsinki, Finland in the welterweight event, where he finished in third place.

Two days before the end of World War II, he witnessed how two German snipers killed fifteen Russian soldiers. After each hit, they clapped their hands off, like athletes do. Due to these incidents he never traveled to Moscow. He had heart problems but died of a stroke.
