= Alessandro D'Ottavio =

Italian boxer (1927–1987)

Medal record

Men's boxing

Representing Italy

Olympic Games
Bronze medal – third place	1948 London	Welterweight

Alessandro D'Ottavio (26 August 1927 – 31 December 1987) was an Italian boxer. He won the bronze medal at the Olympic Games in 1948 for Italy in the 67 kg category. He was born in Rome, Italy.

== 1948 Olympic results ==
- Round of 32: defeated George Issaberg (Iran) on points
- Round of 16: defeated Pierre Hernandez (France) on points
- Quarterfinal: defeated Zygmunt Chychla (Poland) on points
- Semifinal: lost to Julius Torma (Czechoslovakia) on points
- Bronze Medal Bout: defeated Duggie Du Perez (South Africa) on points (won bronze medal)

== Professional career ==
D'Ottavio turned pro in 1950 and captured the vacant Italian light heavyweight title in 1957 with a win over Rocco Mazzola. He retired the following year after a loss to Mazzola.
