= Aurelio Díaz (boxer) =

Spanish boxer (1923–2013)

Aurelio Díaz Cadaveda (22 May 1923 – 21 June 2013) was a Spanish welterweight boxer. He was born in Gijón. He made it to the quarter-finals at the 1948 Summer Olympics. Díaz died in Argentina on 21 June 2013, at the age of 90.
