= Boxing at the 1952 Summer Olympics – Flyweight =

Olympic boxing tournament

Flyweight boxing at the Games of the XV Olympiad
- Venue: Messuhalli
- Dates: 28 July – 2 August 1952
- Competitors: 27 from 27 nations

Medalists
1st place, gold medalist(s)		Nate Brooks	United States
2nd place, silver medalist(s)		Edgar Basel	Germany
3rd place, bronze medalist(s)		Anatoli Bulakov	Soviet Union
3rd place, bronze medalist(s)		Willie Toweel	South Africa

The men's flyweight event was part of the boxing programme at the 1952 Summer Olympics. The weight class was the lightest contested, and allowed boxers of up to 51 kilograms. The competition was held from 28 July to 2 August 1952. 27 boxers from 27 nations competed.

== Medalists ==
Gold	Nate Brooks; United States
Silver	Edgar Basel; Germany
Bronze	Anatoli Bulakov; Soviet Union
Bronze	Willie Toweel; South Africa

== Results ==
Winner	NOC	Result	Loser	NOC
First Round (28 & 29 July)
Mircea Dobrescu	Romania	2 – 1	Yoshitaro Nagata	Japan
Alfred Zima	Austria	2 – 1	Pablo Lugo	Puerto Rico
Nate Brooks	United States	3 – 0	Risto Luukkonen	Finland
Thorbjørn Clausen	Norway	2 – 1	Kjeld Steen	Denmark
Willie Toweel	South Africa	3 – 0	Kornél Molnár	Hungary
Leslie Donovan Perera Handunge	Ceylon	2 – 1	Jesús Tello	Mexico
Roland Johansson	Sweden	2 – 1	Alberto Barenghi	Argentina
Han Soo-An	South Korea	TKO 1R.	Helmut Hofmann	Saar
Edgar Basel	Germany	3 – 0	Henryk Kukier	Poland
Aristide Pozzali	Italy	3 – 0	Andrew Reddy	Ireland
Dai Dower	Great Britain	3 – 0	Abdel Amid Boutefnouchet	France
Anatoli Bulakov	Soviet Union	3 – 0	Hein van der Zee	Netherlands
Al Asuncion	Philippines	TKO 2R.	Basil Thompson	Burma
Sakti Mazumdar	India	DNS	Nguyen Van Cua	Vietnam
Second Round (30 July)
Thorbjørn Clausen	Norway	BYE
Edgar Basel	Germany	BYE
Dai Dower	Great Britain	3 – 0	Leslie Donovan Perera Handunge	Ceylon
Anatoli Bulakov	Soviet Union	3 – 0	Aristide Pozzali	Italy
Mircea Dobrescu	Romania	3 – 0	Roland Johansson	Sweden
Nate Brooks	United States	3 – 0	Alfred Zima	Austria
Han Soo-An	South Korea	3 – 0	Sakti Mazumdar	India
Willie Toweel	South Africa	2 – 1	Al Asuncion	Philippines
Third Round (31 July)
Willie Toweel	South Africa	3 – 0	Han Soo-An	South Korea
Anatoli Bulakov	Soviet Union	2 – 1	Dai Dower	Great Britain
Edgar Basel	Germany	TKO 3R.	Thorbjørn Clausen	Norway
Nate Brooks	United States	2 – 1	Mircea Dobrescu	Romania
Semi-final (1 August)
Edgar Basel	Germany	2 – 1	Anatoli Bulakov	Soviet Union
Nate Brooks	United States	3 – 0	Willie Toweel	South Africa
Final (2 August)
Nate Brooks	United States	3 – 0	Edgar Basel	Germany
