= Deaths in July 1993 =

The following is a list of notable deaths in July 1993.

Entries for each day are listed alphabetically by surname. A typical entry lists information in the following sequence:

- Name, age, country of citizenship at birth, subsequent country of citizenship (if applicable), reason for notability, cause of death (if known), and reference.

== July 1993 ==
=== 1 ===
- Tom Berry, 81, English rugby player and administrator.
- Gert Hofmann, 62, German writer and professor, cerebrovascular disease.
- Sevi Holmsten, 71, Finnish Olympic rower (1952).
- Eric Irvin, 84, Australian writer and historian of Australian theatre.

=== 2 ===
- Ingvar Berg, 87, Swedish Air Force officer and Olympic pentathlete (1928).
- Weary Dunlop, 85, Australian surgeon and POW during World War II.
- Fred Gwynne, 66, American actor (The Munsters, Car 54, Where Are You?, Pet Sematary), pancreatic cancer.
- Irving J. Moore, 74, American television director, heart attack.
- Joe Muich, 89, American baseball player (Boston Braves).
- Mariette Protin, 87, French Olympic freestyle swimmer (1924).
- Clarence Zener, 87, American physicist.
- Notable people killed during the Sivas massacre
  - Muhlis Akarsu, 45, Turkish folk singer and musician
  - Behçet Aysan, 44, Turkish poet
  - Asım Bezirci, 66, Turkish critic, writer and poet
  - Nesimi Çimen, 62, Turkish folk singer and poet
  - Hasret Gültekin, 22, Turkish musician and poet

=== 3 ===
- Giichi Arima, 81, Japanese baseball player.
- Novica Čanović, 31, Yugoslav and Serbian high jumper and Olympian (1984), killed in action.
- Joe DeRita, 83, American actor and comedian (The Three Stooges), pneumonia.
- Don Drysdale, 56, American Hall of Fame baseball player (Brooklyn/Los Angeles Dodgers), and television sports commentator, heart attack.
- Américo Fernandes, 93, Brazilian Olympic rower (1932).
- Jorge Carpio Nicolle, 60, Guatemalan politician and newspaper publisher, murdered.
- Dave Rubinstein, 28, American singer and co-founder of hardcore punk band Reagan Youth, suicide.

=== 4 ===
- Yvette Amice, 57, French mathematician
- Bona Arsenault, 89, Canadian politician.
- Lew Evans, 65, Australian rules footballer.
- Lola Gaos, 71, Spanish actress, colorectal cancer.
- Alston Scott Householder, 89, American mathematician.
- Roman Abelevich Kachanov, 72, Soviet and Russian animator.
- Hellmut Lantschner, 83, Austrian-German alpine skier and world champion.
- Anne Shirley, 75, American actress, lung cancer.
- Walter Stephenson, 82, American baseball player (Chicago Cubs, Philadelphia Phillies).
- John Treadaway, 79, British boxer and Olympian (1936).

=== 5 ===
- Kali Banerjee, 71, Indian actor.
- George Barker, 77, Australian rules footballer.
- Charlie Bishop, 69, American baseball player (Philadelphia/Kansas City Athletics).
- Maria Teresa de Noronha, 74, Portuguese aristocrat and fado singer.
- Tom Maguire, 101, Irish republican and politician.
- Harrison Salisbury, 84, American journalist.

=== 6 ===
- Olive Ann Beech, 88, American businesswoman and co-founder of the Beech Aircraft Corporation
- John Gatenby Bolton, 71, British-Australian astronomer.
- Jean-Baptiste Delille, 80, French racing cyclist.
- Ruth Roche, Baroness Fermoy, 84, British Lady-in-waiting and confidante of Queen Elizabeth the Queen Mother.
- Szabolcs Izsák, 49, Hungarian Olympic sailor (1968, 1972).
- Michael Rothenstein, 85, English printmaker, painter and art teacher.

=== 7 ===
- Elemér Berkessy, 88, Hungarian football player and coach.
- Aleks Buda, 82, Albanian historian.
- Ben Chapman, 84, American Major League Baseball player, heart attack.
- Ove Arbo Høeg, 94, Norwegian botanist.
- Rıfat Ilgaz, 82, Turkish teacher, writer and poet.
- Bob Lundell, 86, American football player.
- William McElwee Miller, 100, American missionary and author.
- Larry Napp, 77, American baseball umpire.
- Ray Powell, 69, Australian rules footballer.
- Mia Zapata, 27, American singer (The Gits), murdered.

=== 8 ===
- Charles Adkins, 61, American boxer and Olympic champion (1952).
- John Brackenborough, 96, Canadian ice hockey player (Boston Bruins).
- Isabela Corona, 80, Mexican actress, heart attack.
- Eddie Dixon, 77, American baseball player.
- Wayne Howell, 72, American voice-over announcer, heart attack.
- Phil Nagle, 71, Australian rules footballer.
- John Riseley-Prichard, 69, British racing driver, AIDS related disease.
- Paul Sharits, 50, American filmmaker and visual artist.
- Fred Weick, 93, American aviation pioneer and aircraft designer.

=== 9 ===
- Metin Altıok, 52, Turkish poet, arson attack.
- Henry Hazlitt, 98, American journalist and writer.
- Jaap Meijer, 80, Dutch historian and poet.
- Steve Previn, 67, German-American television director and film producer.
- Will Rogers, Jr., 81, American politician, writer, and newspaper publisher, suicide.

=== 10 ===
- Teodor Anioła, 67, Polish football player.
- Alfred Haemerlinck, 87, Belgian road bicycle racer.
- Muhammad Ali Haitham, 53, Prime Minister of South Yemen.
- Masuji Ibuse, 95, Japanese author.
- Ruth Krauss, 91, American children's author.
- Ivan Maček, 84, Yugoslav-Slovenian communist politician.
- Sam Rolfe, 69, American screenwriter and television producer (The Man from U.N.C.L.E.), heart attack.
- Armand Vaquerin, 42, French rugby player.

=== 11 ===
- Mario Bauzá Cárdenas, 82, Cuban latin and jazz musician.
- Jack Downing, 73, British sculptor.
- Bill Falkinder, 71, Australian air force officer and politician.
- Bill McKalip, 86, American football player (Portsmouth Spartans, Detroit Lions).
- Mary Moder, 87, American voice actress for Disney, heart attack.
- Saint Sophrony, 96, Russian monk and Archimandrite.
- Denis Tomlinson, 82, Rhodesian cricket player.

=== 12 ===
- Ferdinando Giuseppe Antonelli, 96, Italian Roman Catholic cardinal.
- Lily Bouwmeester, 91, Dutch actress.
- Li Da, 88, Chinese communist general.
- Dan Eldon, 22, British-Kenyan photojournalist, artist and activist, stoned.
- Michał Goleniewski, 70, Polish intelligence officer and spy.
- Saiyid Nurul Hasan, 71, Indian historian and politician, kidney failure.
- Gusti Huber, 78, Austrian-American actress.
- John Jenkins, 62, American jazz saxophonist.
- Ruth Norman, 92, American religious leader.
- James Peck, 78, American activist and pacifist.
- Antun Šoljan, 60, Croatian writer.

=== 13 ===
- Davey Allison, 32, American NASCAR racing driver, helicopter crash.
- Bernard Bienvenu, 72, French footballer and Olympian (1948).
- Jürgen Frohriep, 65, German actor.
- A. K. Ramanujan, 64, Indian poet and scholar.
- Leslie Thorne, 77, Scottish racing driver.

=== 14 ===
- Henning A. Blomen, 82, American politician.
- Léo Ferré, 76, French-Monégasque poet and composer.
- Hannes Kästner, 63, German organist and harpsichordist.
- Bobby Kent, 20, American murder victim.
- Gary Mull, 55, American yacht designer.

=== 15 ===
- Hugo Ballivián, 92, President of Bolivia.
- Maurice Beke, 85, Belgian Olympic wrestler (1936).
- David Brian, 78, American actor, cancer.
- Young Corbett III, 88, Italian-born American boxing champion.
- Yevgeny Fyodorov, 81, Soviet Air Force major general and Hero of the Soviet Union.
- Antonio García, 84, Mexican Olympic sports shooter (1936).
- Phil Gehrig, 58, Australian rules footballer.
- Bert Greeves, 87, British motorcycle pioneer.

=== 16 ===
- Gretel Adorno, 91, German chemist and intellectual.
- Jack Brewer, 79, British athlete and Olympian (1948).
- Tom Burns, 76, Australian rules footballer.
- Joseph Culverwell, 75, Zimbabwean politician.
- Michel Hollard, 95, French member of the resistance during World War II.
- Genowefa Kobielska, 87, Polish track and field athlete and Olympian (1928).
- José Pastenes, 78, Chilean football player.

=== 17 ===
- Vladimir Barmin, 84, Russian engineer and rocket scientist.
- Pál Dunay, 84, Hungarian epee and foil fencer and Olympian (1936, 1948).
- Eschel Rhoodie, 60, South African politician and spin doctor.
- Hamo Sahyan, 79, Armenian poet and translator.
- Scott Salmon, 50, American choreographer, dancer, and musical theatre actor
- Adolf Yushkevich, 87, Soviet historian of mathematics.

=== 18 ===
- Toru Abe, 76, Japanese film actor.
- Héctor Freschi, 82, Argentinian football goalkeeper.
- Jørgen Gry, 78, Danish Olympic field hockey player (1936).
- Jean Negulesco, 93, Romanian-American film director and screenwriter.
- Davis Roberts, 76, American actor, pulmonary emphysema.
- Ted Sadowski, 57, American baseball player (Washington Senators/Minnesota Twins).
- Michael Winstanley, Baron Winstanley, 74, British politician.

=== 19 ===
- Szymon Goldberg, 84, Polish-American classical violinist and conductor.
- Gordon Gray, 82, Scottish Roman Catholic cardinal.
- Shozo Ishihara, 82, Japanese Olympic speed skater (1932, 1936).
- Girilal Jain, 69, Indian journalist.
- Elmar Klos, 83, Czech film director.
- Fred Liewehr, 84, Austrian stage and film actor.
- Frederic Orendi, 63, Romanian Olympic gymnast (1952, 1964).
- Red Prysock, 67, American rhythm and blues tenor saxophonist.
- Luzius Rüedi, 93, Swiss ice hockey player (1928).

=== 20 ===
- Mitchell Brookins, 32, American football player (Buffalo Bills).
- Vince Foster, 48, American attorney and deputy White House counsel, suicide.
- Afanasy Kovalyov, 89, Soviet statesman and politician.
- Jacqueline Lamba, 82, French painter and surrealist artist.
- Adolf Macek, 53, Austrian footballer.
- Charles Rice, 85, Australian rugby league footballer.
- Kath Smith, 77, Australian cricketer.
- Tsunemi Tsuda, 32, Japanese baseball player, brain cancer.

=== 21 ===
- Walter Blair Jr., 32, American murderer, execution by lethal injection.
- Harry Freeman-Jackson, 82, Irish Olympic equestrian (1952, 1956, 1960, 1964).
- Fusanishiki Katsuhiko, 57, Japanese sumo wrestler.
- Robert Glass, 53, American sound engineer (E.T. the Extra-Terrestrial, Close Encounters of the Third Kind, Flashdance), Oscar winner (1983).
- René-Jean Jacquet, 60, French football goalkeeper.
- Edwin James George Pitman, 95, Australian mathematician.
- Richard Tee, 49, American musician, prostate cancer.
- Michael Wulf, 29, German heavy metal musician, motorcycle accident.

=== 22 ===
- John Crichton-Stuart, 6th Marquess of Bute, 60, Scottish peer and art collector, cancer.
- Gunnar Bror Fritiof Degelius, 90, Swedish lichenologist.
- Piero Heliczer, 56, Italian-American poet, publisher, actor and filmmaker, traffic collision.
- Roscoe Robinson, Jr., 64, American Army general.
- Ivar Stokke, 82, Norwegian wrestler and Olympian (1936).

=== 23 ===
- Saad bin Abdulaziz, 77, Saudi royal.
- Florence Nightingale David, 83, English statistician.
- Raul Gardini, 60, Italian businessman, suicide.
- John Langford-Holt, 77, British politician.
- Rudolf Macúch, 73, Slovak-German linguist.
- Luís de Sttau Monteiro, 67, Portuguese writer, novelist and playwright.
- Rupert Mudge, 65, Australian rugby player.
- Abe Shires, 76, American gridiron football player (Philadelphia Eagles).
- Otis "Big Smokey" Smothers, 64, American Chicago blues guitarist and singer.
- Megan Taylor, 72, British figure skater and Olympian (1932).
- Lera Millard Thomas, 92, American politician, member of the United States House of Representatives (1966-1967).
- James R. Jordan Sr., 56, father of famed basketball player Michael Jordan, gunshot wound.

=== 24 ===
- George Armstrong, 69, American baseball player (Philadelphia Athletics).
- Robert Bednar, 82, Austrian Olympic bobsledder (1936).
- Erik Jansson, 86, Swedish Olympic road racing cyclist (1928).
- Anna Maurizio, 92, Swiss biologist.
- Joe Osmanski, 75, American gridiron football player (Chicago Bears).
- Víktor Pankrashkin, 35, Soviet basketball player and Olympian (1988).
- Rene Requiestas, 36, Filipino actor and comedian, tuberculosis.

=== 25 ===
- Margaret Campbell, Duchess of Argyll, 80, Scottish noblewoman.
- Francis Bouygues, 70, French businessman and film producer.
- Ganku, 69, Chinese politician.
- Nan Grey, 75, American film actress, heart attack.
- Steven Pankow, 85, American businessman and politician.
- Cecilia Parker, 79, Canadian-American film actress.
- Vincent Schaefer, 87, American chemist and meteorologist.
- Conrad L. Wirth, 93, American landscape architect and conservationist.

=== 26 ===
- Daniel Fuchs, 84, American screenwriter, fiction writer, and essayist, heart failure.
- Marcellite Garner, 83, American artist and voice actress (Minnie Mouse).
- Jesús Castro González, 42, Spanish football player, drowned.
- Simon Greenberg, 92, Russian-American rabbi and scholar.
- Mikhail Kozell, 81, Soviet and Russian painter.
- Yuri Levitin, 80, Soviet and Russian composer of classical music.
- Matthew Ridgway, 98, American Army officer, cardiovascular disease.

=== 27 ===
- Lauren Ackerman, 88, American physician and pathologist.
- John Brooks, 73, American writer, stroke.
- Kashiko Kawakita, 85, Japanese film producer and film curator.
- Reggie Lewis, 27, American basketball player (Boston Celtics), heart attack.
- T. Dan Smith, 78, British politician.

=== 28 ===
- Jack Browne, Baron Craigton, 88, Scottish politician.
- Jacques Laudy, 86, Belgian comics artist.
- Michael Laverack, 62, British zoologist, helicopter crash.
- Cemal Madanoğlu, 86, Turkish general and politician.
- Vincent McCarten, 80, New Zealand cricketer.
- Stanley Woods, 90, Irish motorcycle racer.

=== 29 ===
- Fidencio Castillo, 85, Mexican artist and educator.
- Nicolai Costenco, 79, Moldovan writer.
- Joyce Haber, 62, American gossip columnist, kidney and liver failure.
- Charles-André Hamelin, 46, Canadian politician, member of the House of Commons of Canada (1984-1988).
- Jack Kitching, 72, English rugby player and coach.
- Caroline Simon, 92, American lawyer, judge and politician.

=== 30 ===
- Brett Cantor, 25, American record label executive, homicide by stabbing.
- Frank L. Howley, 90, American Army brigadier general.
- Edward E. Jones, 66, American psychologist and scholar.
- Condor Laucke, 78, Australian politician, pulmonary emphysema.
- Darrell Lester, 79, American football player (Green Bay Packers).
- Don Myrick, 53, American saxophonist, shot.
- Edward Bernard Raczyński, 101, Polish diplomat, writer, and politician.
- Jay Scott, 43, Canadian film critic, AIDS-related complications.
- Sigmund Søfteland, 69, Norwegian Olympic speed skater (1952, 1956).
- Bob Wright, 101, American baseball player (Chicago Cubs).

=== 31 ===
- Lola Álvarez Bravo, 90, Mexican photographer.
- Lenore Aubert, 80, Slovenian-American model and actress.
- Baudouin I of Belgium, 62, King of the Belgians, heart attack.
- Armand Di Caro, 62, French racing cyclist.
- Paul B. Henry, 51, American politician and professor of political science, member of the United States House of Representatives (since 1985), brain cancer.
- Gabdrakhman Kadyrov, 52, Soviet speedway rider.
- George Keyt, 92, Sri Lankan painter.
- Leszek Kudłacik, 63, Polish Olympic boxer (1952).
- Sam Langford, 93, American baseball player (Boston Red Sox, Cleveland Indians).
- Richard M. Leonard, 84, American rock climber, environmentalist and attorney.
- Fern Rivard, 47, Canadian ice hockey player (Minnesota North Stars).
- Fang Zhichun, 87, Chinese politician.
