= Puerto Rico at the 1952 Summer Olympics =

- IOC code: PUR
- NOC: Puerto Rico Olympic Committee
- Website: www.copur.pr (in Spanish)

in Helsinki
- Competitors: 21 (21 men, 0 women) in 4 sports
- Flag bearers: Jaime Annexy; Jorge Soto
- Medals: Gold 0 Silver 0 Bronze 0 Total 0

Summer Olympics appearances (overview)
- 1948; 1952; 1956; 1960; 1964; 1968; 1972; 1976; 1980; 1984; 1988; 1992; 1996; 2000; 2004; 2008; 2012; 2016; 2020; 2024; 2028

Puerto Rico competed at the 1952 Summer Olympics in Helsinki, Finland. 21 competitors, all men, took part in 19 events in 4 sports.

== History ==
On November 25, 1950, Avery Brundage contacted Department of State advisor Forney Rankin about the participation of Puerto Rico at the inaugural Pan American Games. The Departments of State, Interior and Defense opposed the idea, as noted in their reply dated December 14, 1950. Brundage argued in favor of sending Puerto Ricans along the USOC, but allowing them the use of their flag. His attempts continued into 1951. Not all American officials in the United States Committee opposed the participation of Puerto Rico in the event, as the participation was favored by organization member General Rose. The issue of having two delegations with the same flag and anthem was also contentious. Ultimately, Puerto Rico did not participate in the games and it became apparent that its participation in such events was done for the foreseeable future.

However, Finland invited the delegation to the 1952 Summer Olympics. The subject became a topic of discussion between Governor Luis Muñoz Marín and Secretary of the Interior James P. Davis. Funding for the delegation was raised locally. The games coincided with the implementation of the Commonwealth, which despite its continuing territorial status recognized the flag of Puerto Rico as official. Due to this, the flag of the United States was used in the opening ceremony, but replaced on July 25. The athletes (among them Eugenio Guerra) were aware of the historic significance of the event, which marked the first time that the flag of Puerto Rico had been used as an official symbol in international events (tough it had been used as an unofficial symbol of protest and resistance prior to it).

== Athletics ==
Track events

Event	Athletes	Heat Round 1		Heat Round 2		Semifinal		Final	
Event	Athletes	Result	Rank	Result	Rank	Result	Rank	Result	Rank
400 m	Frank Rivera	49.3	=39	Did not advance					
800 m	Frank Rivera	1:57.6	=43			Did not advance			
110 m hurdles	Téofilo Colón Molinaris	15.2	19			Did not advance			
110 m hurdles	Juan Lebrón González	15.4	=22			Did not advance			
400 m hurdles	Amadeo Francis	54.0	=9	Did not advance					

Field events

Event	Athletes	Qualification		Final	
Event	Athletes	Result	Rank	Result	Rank
Triple jump	Francisco Castro	13.37	35	Did not advance	
Shot put	Ramón Rosario Rodríguez	14.21	16	Did not advance	
Javelin throw	Reinaldo Luis Oliver Martínez	52.40	25	Did not advance	
Hammer throw	Jaime Annexy Fajardo	NM		Did not advance	

== Boxing ==
Athlete	Event	Round of 32		Round of 16		Quarterfinals		Semifinals		Final	
Athlete	Event	Opposition	Result	Opposition	Result	Opposition	Result	Opposition	Result	Opposition	Result
Pablo Lugo	Flyweight (-51 kg)	Zima (AUT)	L PTS 1:2	Did not advance							
Ángel Figueroa	Bantamweight (51-54 kg)	Tiến (VIE)	W PTS 3:0	Majdloch (TCH)	L PTS 0:3	Did not advance					
Juan Curet	Light-welterweight (60-63.5 kg)	Moussa (LIB)	W KO R2	Visintin (ITA)	L PTS 0:3	Did not advance					

Legend:
PTS = Points
KO = Knockout
R = Round

== Shooting ==
Five shooters represented Puerto Rico in 1952.

Men

Athlete	Event	Final	
Athlete	Event	Score	Rank
Ernesto Rivera	25 m pistol	546	29
José Rua	25 m pistol	553	22
Alberto Guerrero	50 m pistol	517	27
Ramiro Ortíz	50 m pistol	492	44
José Ángel Galiñanes	Trap	117	39
