= Boxing at the 1951 Mediterranean Games =

Boxing competition

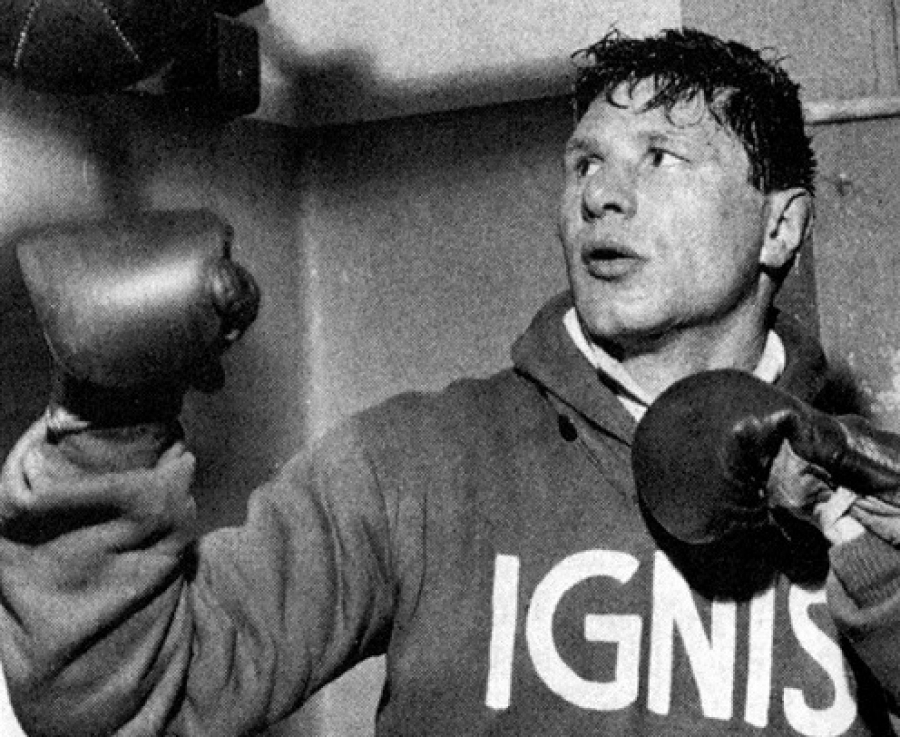
- Italy's Bruno Visintin (1932–2015), gold medalist in Alexandria and bronze medalist at the 1952 Olympics
- Venue: Stade Fouad 1er (Grand Salle)
- Location: Alexandria, Egypt
- Dates: 12–16 October 1951

The boxing tournament at the 1951 Mediterranean Games was held in Alexandria, Egypt.

Although ten nations took part in the inaugural Mediterranean Games multi-sports event, only four of them (Egypt, Italy, Syria, Lebanon) entered athletes for the boxing tournament, which consisted of ten weight divisions.

All the final bouts took place at the Grand Salle of the Stade Fouad 1er (present-day Alexandria Stadium), the oldest and the largest stadium in Africa at the time which also hosted the opening ceremony of the Games on 5 October.

As Mediterranean Games were meant to be an event providing an opportunity for athletes to practice in the year before the Olympics, a number of medalists from Alexandria had either competed for their countries at the 1948 Summer Olympics in London, or later went on to appear at the 1952 Summer Olympics in Helsinki nine months later:

Egypt

- Ali Zaki competed in the –62 kg in 1948
- Gharib Afifi competed in the –71 kg event in 1948
- Moustafa Fahim competed in the –73 kg event in 1948 and in 1952
- Mohamed El-Minabawi competed in the –81 kg event in 1948 and in 1952
- Fathi Abdel Rahman competed in the –67 kg event in 1952
- Ibrahim Abdrabbou competed in the –54 kg event in 1952
- Mohi Hamaky competed in the –60 kg event in 1952
- Ahmed El-Minabawi competed in the +81 kg event in 1952

Italy

- Giacomo Di Segni competed in the –81 kg event in 1948 and +81 kg event in 1952
- Gianbattista Alfonsetti competed in the –81 kg event in 1952
- Aristide Pozzali competed in the –51 kg event in 1952
- Walter Sentimenti competed in the –75 kg event in 1952
- Bruno Visintin competed in the –63.5 kg event in 1952

Lebanon

- Sarkis Moussa competed in the –63.5 kg event in 1952

== Medalists ==
Event	Gold	Silver	Bronze
Flyweight (–51 kg)	Aristide Pozzali (ITA)	El Sayed El Kalash (SYR)	Fekri Idris (EGY)
Bantamweight (–54 kg)	Ibrahim Abdrabbou (EGY)	Veniero Innocenti (ITA)	Said el-Rai (SYR)
Featherweight (–57 kg)	Saleh Abbas (EGY)	Franco Giannini (ITA)	Tewfik Habashi (LBN)
Lightweight (–60 kg)	Bruno Visintin (ITA)	Mohi Hamaky (EGY)	Gamal Afra (LBN)
Light Welterweight (–63.5 kg)	Ali Zaki (EGY)	Mohamed Said Zakairi (SYR)	Sarkis Moussa (LBN)
Welterweight (–67 kg)	Renzo Ruggeri (ITA)	Fathi Abdel Rahman (EGY)	Ragheb Saman (SYR)
Light Middleweight (–71 kg)	Gharib Afifi (EGY)	Josef Habis (LBN)	Salah El Masri (SYR)
Middleweight (–75 kg)	Moustafa Fahim (EGY)	Mohamad El Aktaa (SYR)	Walter Sentimenti (ITA)
Light Heavyweight (–81 kg)	Gianbattista Alfonsetti (ITA)	Mohamed El-Minabawi (EGY)	Abdel Wahab El Halabi (LBN)
Heavyweight (+81 kg)	Giacomo Di Segni (ITA)	Ahmed El-Minabawi (EGY)	Fathi El Tork (SYR)

== Medal table ==
Rank	Nation	Gold	Silver	Bronze	Total
1	Egypt (EGY)	5	4	1	10
2	Italy (ITA)	5	2	1	8
3	Syria (SYR)	0	3	4	7
4	Lebanon (LBN)	0	1	4	5
Totals (4 entries)		10	10	10	30

- Note 1: Official 1951 Mediterranean Games report erroneously lists silver-winning Veniero Innocenti (ITA) as Egyptian
- Note 2: Official report erroneously classifies –57 kg results as –60 kg category and –60 kg results as –63.5 kg
- Note 3: Official report is missing all three medalists in the –63.5 kg category (Zaki, Zakairi, Moussa), listing only 9 out of 10 weight divisions
