= Boxing at the 1952 Summer Olympics – Light welterweight =

Olympic boxing tournament

Light welterweight boxing at the Games of the XV Olympiad
- Venue: Messuhalli
- Dates: 28 July – 2 August 1952
- Competitors: 28 from 28 nations

Medalists
1st place, gold medalist(s)		Charles Adkins	United States
2nd place, silver medalist(s)		Viktor Mednov	Soviet Union
3rd place, bronze medalist(s)		Bruno Visintin	Italy
3rd place, bronze medalist(s)		Erkki Mallenius	Finland

The men's light welterweight event was part of the boxing programme at the 1952 Summer Olympics. It was the inaugural Olympic event for the weight class and it allowed boxers of up to 63.5 kilograms to compete. The competition was held from 28 July to 2 August 1952. 28 boxers from 28 nations competed.

== Medalists ==
Gold	Charles Adkins; United States
Silver	Viktor Mednov; Soviet Union
Bronze	Bruno Visintin; Italy
Bronze	Erkki Mallenius; Finland

== Results ==
Winner	NOC	Result	Loser	NOC
First Round (28 July)
Erkki Aarno Mallenius	Finland	BYE
Stanley Majid	Burma	BYE
Jean Paternotte	Belgium	BYE
Fernand Backes	Luxemburg	BYE
René Weissmann	France	2 – 1	Leszek Kudłacik	Poland
Pavle Šovljanski	Yugoslavia	3 – 0	Béla Farkas	Hungary
Francisc Ambrus	Romania	3 – 0	Hans Petersen	Denmark
Viktor Mednov	Soviet Union	TKO 2R	Norman Jones	Australia
Peter Waterman	Great Britain	2 – 1	Oscar Gallardo	Argentina
Alexander Webster	South Africa	3 – 0	Herbert Schilling	Germany
Charles Adkins	United States	TKO 1R	Leif Hansen	Norway
Salomon Carrizales	Venezuela	2 – 1	Celestino Pinto	Brazil
Piet van Klaveren	Netherlands	2 – 1	Roy Keenan	Canada
Terence Milligan	Ireland	3 – 0	Ebrahim Afsharpour	Iran
Juan Curet	Puerto Rico	KO 2R	Sarkis Moussa	Lebanon
Bruno Visintin	Italy	KO 2R	Ernesto Porto	Philippines
Second Round ( 29 & 30 July)
Erkki Aarno Mallenius	Finland	TKO 3R	Stanley Majid	Burma
Jean Louis Paternotte	Belgium	3 – 0	Fernand Backes	Luxembourg
Rene Weismann	France	DSQ 3R	Pavle Šovljanski	Yugoslavia
Viktor Mednov	Soviet Union	Injured	Francisc Ambrus	Romania
Alexander Grant Webster	South Africa	3 – 0	Peter Waterman	Great Britain
Charles Adkins	United States	3 – 0	Salomon Carrizales	Venezuela
Terence Milligan	Ireland	3 – 0	Piet van Klaveren	Netherlands
Bruno Visintin	Italy	3 – 0	Juan Curet Alvarez	Puerto Rico
Third Round (31 July)
Charles Adkins	United States	3 – 0	Alexander Grant Webster	South Africa
Erkki Aarno Mallenius	Finland	2 – 1	Jean Louis Paternotte	Belgium
Bruno Visintin	Italy	3 – 0	Terence Milligan	Ireland
Viktor Mednov	Soviet Union	3 – 0	Rene Weismann	France
Semi-final (1 August)
Viktor Mednov	Soviet Union	Walk-over	Erkki Aarno Mallenius	Finland
Charles Adkins	United States	3 – 0	Bruno Visintin	Italy
Final (2 August)
Charles Adkins	United States	2 – 1	Viktor Mednov	Soviet Union
