= Boxing at the 1952 Summer Olympics =

Boxing at the Games of the XV Olympiad

Final results for the boxing competition at the 1952 Summer Olympics. The events were held at Messuhalli. From this edition of the Olympic Games, the bronze medal match was abolished. No bronze medals were awarded, but their flags were on the podium. In 1970, the AIBA and IOC agreed to retroactively award bronze medals to losing semifinalists.

== Medal summary ==
Games	Gold	Silver	Bronze
Flyweight (−51 kg)	Nate Brooks; United States	Edgar Basel; Germany	Anatoli Bulakov; Soviet Union
Flyweight (−51 kg)	Nate Brooks; United States	Edgar Basel; Germany	Willie Toweel; South Africa
Bantamweight (−54 kg)	Pentti Hämäläinen; Finland	John McNally; Ireland	Kang Joon-Ho; South Korea
Bantamweight (−54 kg)	Pentti Hämäläinen; Finland	John McNally; Ireland	Gennady Garbuzov; Soviet Union
Featherweight (−57 kg)	Ján Zachara; Czechoslovakia	Sergio Caprari; Italy	Joseph Ventaja; France
Featherweight (−57 kg)	Ján Zachara; Czechoslovakia	Sergio Caprari; Italy	Leonard Leisching; South Africa
Lightweight (−60 kg)	Aureliano Bolognesi; Italy	Aleksy Antkiewicz; Poland	Gheorghe Fiat; Romania
Lightweight (−60 kg)	Aureliano Bolognesi; Italy	Aleksy Antkiewicz; Poland	Erkki Pakkanen; Finland
Light welterweight (−63.5 kg)	Charles Adkins; United States	Viktor Mednov; Soviet Union	Bruno Visintin; Italy
Light welterweight (−63.5 kg)	Charles Adkins; United States	Viktor Mednov; Soviet Union	Erkki Mallenius; Finland
Welterweight (−67 kg)	Zygmunt Chychla; Poland	Sergei Scherbakov; Soviet Union	Günther Heidemann; Germany
Welterweight (−67 kg)	Zygmunt Chychla; Poland	Sergei Scherbakov; Soviet Union	Victor Jörgensen; Denmark
Light middleweight (−71 kg)	László Papp; Hungary	Theunis van Schalkwyk; South Africa	Boris Tishin; Soviet Union
Light middleweight (−71 kg)	László Papp; Hungary	Theunis van Schalkwyk; South Africa	Eladio Herrera; Argentina
Middleweight (−75 kg)	Floyd Patterson; United States	Vasile Tiță; Romania	Boris Nikolov; Bulgaria
Middleweight (−75 kg)	Floyd Patterson; United States	Vasile Tiță; Romania	Stig Sjölin; Sweden
Light heavyweight (−81 kg)	Norvel Lee; United States	Antonio Pacenza; Argentina	Anatoly Perov; Soviet Union
Light heavyweight (−81 kg)	Norvel Lee; United States	Antonio Pacenza; Argentina	Harry Siljander; Finland
Heavyweight (+81 kg)	Ed Sanders; United States	Ingemar Johansson; Sweden	Ilkka Koski; Finland
Heavyweight (+81 kg)	Ed Sanders; United States	Ingemar Johansson; Sweden	Andries Nieman; South Africa

== Medal table ==
Rank	Nation	Gold	Silver	Bronze	Total
1	United States	5	0	0	5
2	Italy	1	1	1	3
3	Poland	1	1	0	2
4	Finland	1	0	4	5
5	Czechoslovakia	1	0	0	1
5	Hungary	1	0	0	1
7	Soviet Union	0	2	4	6
8	South Africa	0	1	3	4
9	Argentina	0	1	1	2
9	Germany	0	1	1	2
9	Romania	0	1	1	2
9	Sweden	0	1	1	2
13	Ireland	0	1	0	1
14	Bulgaria	0	0	1	1
14	Denmark	0	0	1	1
14	France	0	0	1	1
14	South Korea	0	0	1	1
Totals (17 entries)		10	10	20	40

== Participating nations ==
- Argentina (10)
- Australia (5)
- Austria (4)
- Belgium (5)
- Brazil (6)
- Bulgaria (4)
- Burma (3)
- Canada (7)
- Ceylon (2)
- Czechoslovakia (5)
- Denmark (5)
- Egypt (7)
- Finland (10)
- France (10)
- Germany (9)
- Great Britain (10)
- Hungary (9)
- India (4)
- Iran (6)
- Ireland (8)
- Italy (10)
- Japan (2)
- South Korea (4)
- Lebanon (1)
- Luxembourg (4)
- Mexico (3)
- Netherlands (5)
- Norway (4)
- Pakistan (4)
- Philippines (5)
- Poland (10)
- Puerto Rico (3)
- Romania (10)
- Saar (3)
- South Africa (9)
- Soviet Union (10)
- Sweden (8)
- Switzerland (6)
- United States (10)
- Uruguay (2)
- Venezuela (5)
- Vietnam (2)
- Yugoslavia (3)
