= Lew Evans =

Lew Evans may refer to:

- Lew Evans (rugby union) (1881–?), Australian rugby union player
- Lew Evans (rugby league) (1919–2017), Australian rugby league player
- Lew Evans (Australian rules footballer) (1927–1993)

== See also ==
- Lewis Evans (disambiguation)
