= Cuba at the 1952 Summer Olympics =

- IOC code: CUB
- NOC: Cuban Olympic Committee

in Helsinki
- Competitors: 29 (29 men and 0 women) in 8 sports
- Flag bearer: Fico López
- Medals: Gold 0 Silver 0 Bronze 0 Total 0

Summer Olympics appearances (overview)
- 1900; 1904; 1908–1920; 1924; 1928; 1932–1936; 1948; 1952; 1956; 1960; 1964; 1968; 1972; 1976; 1980; 1984–1988; 1992; 1996; 2000; 2004; 2008; 2012; 2016; 2020; 2024

Cuba competed at the 1952 Summer Olympics in Helsinki, Finland. 29 competitors, all men, took part in 23 events in 8 sports.

== Basketball ==
Men's Team Competition

- Qualification Round (Group A)
  - Defeated Belgium (59–51)
  - Lost to Bulgaria (56–62)
  - Defeated Belgium (71–63)
- Main Round (Group D)
  - Lost to Chile (52–53)
  - Lost to France (42–58)
  - Lost to Egypt (55–66) → did not advance
- Team Roster
  - Alberto Escoto
  - Alfredo Faget
  - Armando Estrada
  - Carlos Bea
  - Casimiro García
  - Fabio Ruíz
  - Fico López
  - Felipe de la Pozas
  - Juan García
  - Mario Quintero
  - Ramón Wiltz
  - Carlos García-Ordóñez

== Fencing ==
One male fencer, represented Cuba in 1952.

Men's foil

- Abelardo Menéndez

Men's épée

- Abelardo Menéndez

== Shooting ==
Two shooters represented Cuba in 1952.

25 m pistol

- Mario de Armas
- Ernesto Herrero

50 m pistol

- Mario de Armas

== Swimming ==
Men

Ranks given are within the heat.

| Athlete | Event | Heat | | Semifinal | | Final | |
| Athlete | Event | Time | Rank | Time | Rank | Time | Rank |
|---|---|---|---|---|---|---|---|
| Nicasio Silverio | 100 m freestyle | 1:00.0 | 3 Q | 59.9 | 8 | Did not advance | |
| Manuel Sanguily | 200 m breaststroke | 2:44.5 | 5 | Did not advance | | | |
