= Shooting at the 1952 Summer Olympics – Men's 25 metre rapid fire pistol =

Sports shooting at the Olympics

Men's 25 metre rapid fire pistol at the Games of the XV Olympiad
- Venue: Malmi shooting range, Malmi, Helsinki
- Dates: 27–28 July 1952
- Competitors: 53 from 28 nations
- Winning score: 579

Medalists
1st place, gold medalist(s)		Károly Takács; Hungary
2nd place, silver medalist(s)		Szilárd Kun; Hungary
3rd place, bronze medalist(s)		Gheorghe Lichiardopol; Romania

The men's ISSF 25 meter rapid fire pistol was a shooting sports event held as part of the Shooting at the 1952 Summer Olympics programme. It was the ninth appearance of the event. The competition was held on 27 and 28 July 1952 at the shooting ranges in Helsinki with 53 shooters from 28 nations competing. The maximum number of shooters per nation was reduced to 2, from 3 in previous Games. The event was won by Károly Takács of Hungary, the first man to successfully defend an Olympic rapid fire title (and second to win multiple medals of any color). Hungary also took the second place, with Szilárd Kun earning silver. Gheorghe Lichiardopol of Romania won bronze in his nation's debut in the event.

== Background ==
This was the ninth appearance of what had been standardised in 1948 as the men's ISSF 25 meter rapid fire pistol event, the only event on the 2020 programme that traces back to 1896. The event has been held at every Summer Olympics except 1904 and 1928 (when no shooting events were held) and 1908; it was nominally open to women from 1968 to 1980, although very few women participated these years. There is no women's equivalent on the Olympic programme, as of 2021. The first five events were quite different, with some level of consistency finally beginning with the 1932 event—which, though it had differences from the 1924 competition, was roughly similar. The 1936 competition followed the 1932 one quite closely. The post-World War II event substantially altered the competition once again.

Four of the top 10 shooters from 1948 returned: gold medalist Károly Takács of Hungary, silver medalist Carlos Enrique Díaz Sáenz Valiente of Argentina, fourth-place finisher (and 1936 bronze medalist Torsten Ullman of Sweden, and ninth-place finisher Michelangelo Borriello of Italy. The two-time reigning (1949 and 1952) world champion was Huelet Benner of the United States; Penait Calcai of Romania had been the runner-up in 1952 and Valiente (the 1947 world champion) had placed third.

Bulgaria, Canada, Guatemala, Puerto Rico, Romania, the Soviet Union, and Venezuela each made their debut in the event. The United States made its seventh appearance in the event, most of any nation.

== Competition format ==
The competition format followed the 1948 format, now very close to the modern rapid fire pistol competition after significant variation before World War II. Each shooter fired 60 shots. These were done in two courses of 30; each course consisted of two stages of 15; each stage consisted of three series of 5. In each stage, the time limit for each series was 8 seconds for the first, 6 seconds for the second, and 4 seconds for the third.

A holdover from the previous Games was that full-body silhouettes, rather than round targets, continued to be used; however, scoring rings had been added so that now each shot was scored up to 10 rather than being strictly hit or miss. Hits were the primary measurement of success; points were only used to differentiate between shooters with the same number of hits.

== Records ==
Prior to the competition, the existing world and Olympic records were as follows.

World record	Károly Takács (HUN)	580	London, United Kingdom	4 August 1948
Olympic record	Károly Takács (HUN)	580	London, United Kingdom	4 August 1948

No new world or Olympic records were set during the competition.

== Schedule ==
Date	Time	Round
Sunday, 27 July 1952	9:00	Course 1
Monday, 28 July 1952	9:00	Course 2

== Results ==
A shoot-off was held between Kun and Lichiardopol for the silver and bronze medals; both tied at 142 in the first shoot-off round of 15 shots. In the second shoot-off round, Kun won 140 to 137.

Rank	Shooter	Nation	Hits	Score
1st place, gold medalist(s)	Károly Takács	Hungary	60	579
2nd place, silver medalist(s)	Szilárd Kun	Hungary	60	578
3rd place, bronze medalist(s)	Gheorghe Lichiardopol	Romania	60	578
4	Carlos Enrique Díaz Sáenz Valiente	Argentina	60	577
5	Pentti Linnosvuo	Finland	60	577
6	Penait Calcai	Romania	60	575
7	William McMillan	United States	60	575
8	Vasily Frolov	Soviet Union	60	573
9	Giorgio Pennacchietti	Italy	60	572
10	Oscar Cervo	Argentina	60	571
11	Vasily Novikov	Soviet Union	60	569
12	Mario de Armas	Cuba	60	568
13	Emilio Álava	Spain	60	568
14	Veli-Jussi Hölsö	Finland	60	566
15	Ernesto Montemayor, Sr.	Mexico	60	565
16	Michelangelo Borriello	Italy	60	561
17	Georgi Keranov	Bulgaria	60	561
18	Carlos Rodríguez	Mexico	60	561
19	Ladislav Ondřej	Czechoslovakia	60	560
20	Herman Barreto	Venezuela	60	558
21	Rogério Tavares	Portugal	60	556
22	José Rua	Puerto Rico	60	553
23	Ludwig Leupold	Germany	60	553
24	Paul Wehner	Germany	60	553
25	Todor Stanchev	Bulgaria	60	552
26	Rudolf Schnyder	Switzerland	60	551
27	Per Winge	Denmark	60	549
28	Guilherme Cavalcanti	Brazil	60	547
29	Ernesto Rivera	Puerto Rico	60	546
30	Gunnar Svendsen	Norway	60	543
31	Zlatko Poláček	Czechoslovakia	60	535
32	José Gómez	Guatemala	60	531
33	Herman Schultz	Monaco	60	512
34	Huelet Benner	United States	59	572
35	Gösta Pihl	Sweden	59	565
36	Martin Gison	Philippines	59	550
37	Oddvar Wenner Nilssen	Norway	59	546
38	Pedro Simão	Brazil	59	543
39	Ernesto Herrero	Cuba	59	540
40	Torsten Ullman	Sweden	59	539
41	Henry Steele	Great Britain	59	538
42	Edson Warner	Canada	59	538
43	Ludovic Heraud	France	59	537
44	Albino de Jesus	Portugal	59	530
45	Félix Cortes	Philippines	58	537
46	Konstantinos Mylonas	Greece	58	533
47	Per Nielsen	Denmark	58	527
48	Henry Swire	Great Britain	58	526
49	Francisco Sandoval	Guatemala	58	508
50	André Martin	France	58	506
51	Angelos Papadimas	Greece	56	506
52	Carlos Monteverde	Venezuela	55	483
53	Charles Bergonzi	Monaco	46	370
