= Philippines at the 1952 Summer Olympics =

- Flag of the Philippines
- IOC code: PHI
- NOC: Philippine Amateur Athletic Federation

in Helsinki
- Competitors: 25 in 7 sports
- Medals: Gold 0 Silver 0 Bronze 0 Total 0

Summer Olympics appearances (overview)
- 1924; 1928; 1932; 1936; 1948; 1952; 1956; 1960; 1964; 1968; 1972; 1976; 1980; 1984; 1988; 1992; 1996; 2000; 2004; 2008; 2012; 2016; 2020; 2024

The Philippines competed at the 1952 Summer Olympics in Helsinki, Finland. 25 competitors, all men, took part in 14 events in 7 sports.

== Basketball ==
Men's team competition

- Qualification Round (Group B)

- Defeated Israel (57-47)
- Defeated Hungary (48-35)

- Main Round (Group C)

- Lost to Argentina (59-85)
- Lost to Brazil (52-71)
- Defeated Canada (81-65) → did not advance, 9th place

- Team roster:

- Florentino Bautista
- Ramon "Ramoncito" Campos Jr.
- Antonio "Tony" Genato
- José Gochangco
- Rafael "Paing" Hechanova
- Eduardo "Eddie" Lim
- Carlos "Caloy" Loyzaga
- Antonio "Pocholo" Martínez (c)
- Ponciano Saldaña
- Meliton Santos
- Antonio Tantay
- Mariano "Nano" Tolentino

- Head coach: Felicisimo "Fely" Fajardo

== Boxing ==
Men's Flyweight:

- Al Asuncion

1. First Round – Defeated Basil Thompson of Burma (TKO 2R)
2. Second Round – Lost to Willie Toweel of South Africa (1 – 2)

Men's Bantamweight:

- Alejandro Ortuoste

1. Second Round – Lost to John McNally of Ireland (0 – 3)

Men's Lightweight:

- Benjamin Enriquez

1. First Round – Lost to Aleksy Antkiewicz of Poland (0 – 3)

Men's Light-Welterweight:

- Ernesto Porto

1. First Round – Lost to Bruno Visintin of Italy (KO 2R)

Men's Welterweight:

- Vicente Tuñacao

1. First Round – José Luis Dávalos of Mexico (TKO 3R)

== Shooting ==
Three shooters represented the Philippines in 1952.

25 m pistol

- Martin Gison
- Félix Cortes

50 m pistol

- Félix Cortes
- Martin Gison

50 m rifle, prone

- Martin Gison
- César Jayme

== Swimming ==
Men

Rank given is within the heat.

Athlete	Event	Heat		Semifinal		Final	
Athlete	Event	Time	Rank	Time	Rank	Time	Rank
Sambiao Basanung	1500 m freestyle	20:58.6	7	—N/a		Did not advance	
