= Shooting at the 1952 Summer Olympics – Men's 50 metre pistol =

Sports shooting at the Olympics

Men's 50 metre pistol at the Games of the XV Olympiad
- Shooting pictogram
- Venue: Malmi shooting range, Malmi, Helsinki
- Date: 25 July 1952
- Competitors: 48 from 28 nations
- Winning score: 553

Medalists
1st place, gold medalist(s)		Huelet Benner; United States
2nd place, silver medalist(s)		Ángel León Gozalo; Spain
3rd place, bronze medalist(s)		Ambrus Balogh; Hungary

The men's ISSF 50 meter pistol was a shooting sports event held as part of the Shooting at the 1952 Summer Olympics programme. It was the eighth appearance of the event. The competition was held on 25 July 1952 at the shooting ranges in Helsinki. 48 shooters from 28 nations competed. The maximum number of shooters per nation was reduced to 2, from 3 in previous Games. The event was won by Huelet Benner of the United States, the nation's first victory in the event since 1920 (and fourth overall, most of any nation). Silver went to Ángel León Gozalo of Spain and bronze to Ambrus Balogh of Hungary; they were the first medals in the free pistol for both nations.

== Background ==
This was the eighth appearance of the ISSF 50 meter pistol event. The event was held at every Summer Olympics from 1896 to 1920 (except 1904, when no shooting events were held) and from 1936 to 2016; it was nominally open to women from 1968 to 1980, although very few women participated these years. A separate women's event would be introduced in 1984. 1896 and 1908 were the only Games in which the distance was not 50 metres; the former used 30 metres and the latter 50 yards.

Five of the top 10 shooters from the 1948 Games returned: bronze medalist (and 1936 gold medalist) Torsten Ullman of Sweden, fourth-place finisher Huelet Benner of the United States, fifth-place finisher Beat Rhyner of Switzerland, sixth-place finisher Ángel León Gozalo of Spain, and seventh-place finisher Ambrus Balogh of Hungary. Ullman was again the world champion in 1952, two weeks before the Games, his fifth time (1933, 1935, 1937, and 1947). Benner finished third at the world championships.

Bulgaria, Egypt, Guatemala, Mexico, the Soviet Union, Venezuela, and Yugoslavia each made their debut in the event. Greece and the United States each made their seventh appearance, tied for most of any nation.

Benner used a Hämmerli 100.

== Competition format ==
The competition had each shooter fire 60 shots, in 6 series of 10 shots each, at a distance of 50 metres. The target was round, 50 centimetres in diameter, with 10 scoring rings. Scoring for each shot was up to 10 points, in increments of 1 point. The maximum score possible was 600 points. Any pistol was permitted.

== Records ==
Prior to this competition, the existing world and Olympic records were as follows.

World record	Torsten Ullman (SWE)	559	Berlin, Germany	7 August 1936
Olympic record	Torsten Ullman (SWE)	559	Berlin, Germany	7 August 1936

No new world or Olympic records were set during the competition.

== Schedule ==
Date	Time	Round
Friday, 25 July 1952	9:00	Final

== Results ==
Rank	Shooter	Nation	Score
1st place, gold medalist(s)	Huelet Benner	United States	553
2nd place, silver medalist(s)	Ángel León Gozalo	Spain	550
3rd place, bronze medalist(s)	Ambrus Balogh	Hungary	549
4	Konstantin Martazov	Soviet Union	546
5	Lev Vainshtein	Soviet Union	546
6	Torsten Ullman	Sweden	543
7	Klaus Lahti	Finland	541
8	Beat Rhyner	Switzerland	539
9	Francisco Sandoval	Guatemala	535
10	Oiva Tylli	Finland	535
11	Hugo Lundkvist	Sweden	532
12	Ronald Guy	Great Britain	531
13	Raúl Ibarra	Mexico	530
14	Ferenc Décsey	Hungary	530
15	František Maxa	Czechoslovakia	530
16	Mario de Armas	Cuba	526
17	Gunnar Svendsen	Norway	523
18	José Reyes Rodríguez	Mexico	523
19	Jorge de Oliveira	Brazil	522
20	Luciano Galesi	Italy	522
21	Edvard Delorenco	Yugoslavia	521
22	Félix Cortes	Philippines	521
23	Rudolf Vuk	Yugoslavia	521
24	Miroslav Proft	Czechoslovakia	519
25	Rolf Klementsen	Norway	518
26	Stoyan Popov	Bulgaria	517
27	Alberto Guerrero	Puerto Rico	517
28	Antoine Shousha	Egypt	517
29	Abdel Sattar Tarabulsi	Lebanon	517
30	Harry Wendell Reeves	United States	515
31	Carlos Choque	Argentina	515
32	Martin Gison	Philippines	515
33	Álvaro dos Santos Filho	Brazil	513
34	Fritz Krempel	Germany	512
35	Enrique Ojeda	Chile	510
36	Renato Sacchi	Italy	509
37	Hector de Lima Polanco	Venezuela	506
38	Alexander Specker	Switzerland	506
39	Herman Schultz	Monaco	501
40	André Martin	France	500
41	Nikolay Khristozov	Bulgaria	500
42	William White	Great Britain	498
43	Georgios Stathis	Greece	496
44	Ramiro Ortiz	Puerto Rico	492
45	Mohamed Ahmed Aly	Egypt	491
46	Khalil Hilmi	Lebanon	489
47	Roger Tauvel	France	489
48	Carlos Marrero	Venezuela	483
