= Charles Adkins (boxer) =

American boxer (1932–1993)

Medal record

Men's boxing

Representing the United States

Olympic Games
| Gold medal – first place | 1952 Helsinki | Light welterweight |

Charles Adkins (April 27, 1932, in Gary, Indiana – July 8, 1993) was a boxer from the United States.

== Amateur career ==
Chuck Adkins was the Olympic Gold Medalist at the 1952 Helsinki Olympics, in the Light Welterweight (140 lb/63.5 kg) class. In the final he defeated Viktor Mednov of the Soviet Union on a 2–1 decision. The bout was notable as being the first ever boxing match between the United States and the Soviet Union.

At the time of the Olympics, Adkins, was a 20-year-old police administration student. Adkins also won the National AAU Lightweight championship in 1949.

Adkins attended San Jose State University, and won a 1952 NCAA championship for his weight class.

== 1952 Olympic results ==
Below is the Record Of Charles Adkins, an American light welterweight boxer who competed at the 1952 Helsinki Olympics:

- Round of 32: Defeated Leif Hansen (Norway) referee stopped contest in first round
- Round of 16: Defeated Salomon Carrizales (Venezuela) by decision, 3–0
- Quarterfinal: Defeated Alexander Grant Webster (South Africa) by decision, 3–0
- Semifinal: Defeated Bruno Visintin (Italy) by decision, 3–0
- Final Defeated Viktor Mednov (Soviet Union) by decision, 2–1 (won gold medal)

Charles Adkins bout vs. Viktor Mednov was the first ever sanctioned world class boxing match between U.S. and Soviet boxers.
