= Aristide Pozzali =

Italian boxer (1931–1979)

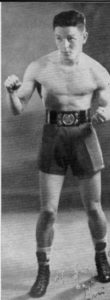

Personal information
- Nationality: Italian
- Born: 12 October 1931; Cremona, Italy
- Died: 16 January 1979 (aged 47)

Sport
- Sport: Boxing

Aristide Pozzali (12 October 1931 – 16 January 1979) was an Italian boxer. In 1951 he won the European Amateur Boxing Championships in Milan. He competed in the men's flyweight event at the 1952 Summer Olympics. At the 1952 Summer Olympics, he defeated Andrew Reddy of Ireland, before losing to Anatoli Bulakov of the Soviet Union.
