= Viktor Mednov =

Russian boxer (1927–2009)

Personal information
- Born: 27 November 1927 Moscow, Russian SFSR, Soviet Union
- Died: 22 June 2009 (aged 81) Moscow, Russia

Sport
- Sport: Boxing
- Club: Trudovye Rezervy
Medal record
Representing the Soviet Union
Olympic Games
Silver medal – second place	1952 Helsinki	Light welterweight

Viktor Ivanovich Mednov (Russian: Виктор Иванович Меднов, 27 November 1927 – 22 June 2009) was a Russian boxer from the Soviet Union who won a silver medal in the light welterweight division at the 1952 Olympics. He had a difficult second bout with Francisc Ambrus of Romania, with Mednov prevailing when the referee stopped the bout due to bad cuts sustained by both opponents. Mednov had a break in the semifinal, as Erkki Mallenius withdrew with a hand injury. In the final he was defeated by Chuck Adkins in a 2–1 decision. This was the first boxing match between boxers from the United States and the Soviet Union.

Mednov was known for his strength and power – he could hold the Azaryan Cross on gymnastic rings and punched the bags in training so viciously that his hands were bleeding despite ample protection (elastic bandages and full-size competition gloves). In retirement he worked as a boxing coach for his sports society Trudovye Rezervy and painted landscapes as a hobby.

== 1952 Olympic results ==
Below are Viktor Mednov's results from the 1952 Olympic boxing tournament in Helsinki, Finland where Mednov competed for the Soviet Union as a light welterweight:

- Round of 32: defeated Norman Jones (Australia) TKO 2
- Round of 16: defeated Fransisc Ambrus (Romania) referee stopped bout due to cuts
- Quarterfinal: defeated Rene Weismann (France) by decision (3-0)
- Semifinal: defeated Erkki Aarno Mallenius (Finland) by walkover
- Final: lost to Charles Adkins (USA) by decision (1-2); was awarded silver medal

Charles Adkins bout vs. Viktor Mednov was the first ever sanctioned world class boxing match between U.S. and Soviet boxers.
