= Károly Takács =

Hungarian sport shooter

- Takács at the 1956 Summer Olympics in Melbourne

Personal information
- Nationality: Hungarian
- Born: 21 January 1910 Budapest, Kingdom of Hungary
- Died: 5 January 1976 (aged 65) Budapest, Hungary

Sport
- Sport: Sports shooting
Medal record
Men's shooting
Representing Hungary
Olympic Games
Gold medal – first place	1948 London	25 m rapid fire pistol
Gold medal – first place	1952 Helsinki	25 m rapid fire pistol

Károly Takács (21 January 1910 – 5 January 1976) was the first shooter to win two Olympic gold medals in the 25 metre rapid fire pistol event, both with his left hand after his right hand was seriously injured. He is the third known physically disabled athlete to have competed in the Olympic Games after George Eyser in 1904 and Olivér Halassy in 1928, followed by Liz Hartel in 1952, Neroli Fairhall in 1984 and Oscar Pistorius in 2012.

== Military service and early shooting career ==
Takács was born in Budapest and joined the Hungarian Army. By 1936, he was a world-class pistol shooter, but he was denied a place in the Hungarian shooting team for the 1936 Summer Olympics on the grounds that he was a sergeant, and only commissioned officers were allowed to compete. This prohibition was lifted in Hungary after the Berlin Games, and Takács had expectations of success at the 1940 Summer Olympics, scheduled to be held in Tokyo.

During army training in 1938, his right hand was badly injured when a faulty grenade exploded. Takács was determined to continue his shooting career, and switched to shooting with his left hand. He practiced in secret, surprising his countrymen when he won the Hungarian national pistol shooting championship in the spring of 1939. He also was a member of the Hungarian team that won the 1939 UIT World Shooting Championships in the event.

== Olympic successes, flourishing career ==
The Olympic Games scheduled for 1940 and 1944 were canceled due to the Second World War. However, Takács surprised the world by winning the gold medal at the 1948 Summer Olympics in London, aged 38, beating the favourite, Argentine Carlos Enrique Díaz Sáenz Valiente, the reigning world champion.

Takács won a second gold medal in the same event at the 1952 Summer Olympics in Helsinki

== Later career ==
Takács also attended the 1956 Summer Olympics in Melbourne, but finished eighth and failed to win a third medal.

Although most associated with the rapid fire pistol, Takács also won a bronze medal at the 1958 ISSF World Shooting Championships in 25 metre center-fire pistol. He also won 35 Hungarian national shooting championships.

== After shooting career ==
After his shooting career, Takács became a coach. He trained Hungarian Szilárd Kun, who won the silver medal at the 1952 Summer Olympics. He ended his army career as a lieutenant colonel.

== Legacy ==
His story has given him a place among the "Olympic heroes" of the International Olympic Committee. Two Olympic gold medals were won by Józef Zapędzki (Mexico 1968 and Munich 1972) as well but not until Ralf Schumann's third victory in the 2004 Olympics did a shooter succeed in winning three gold medals in this event.

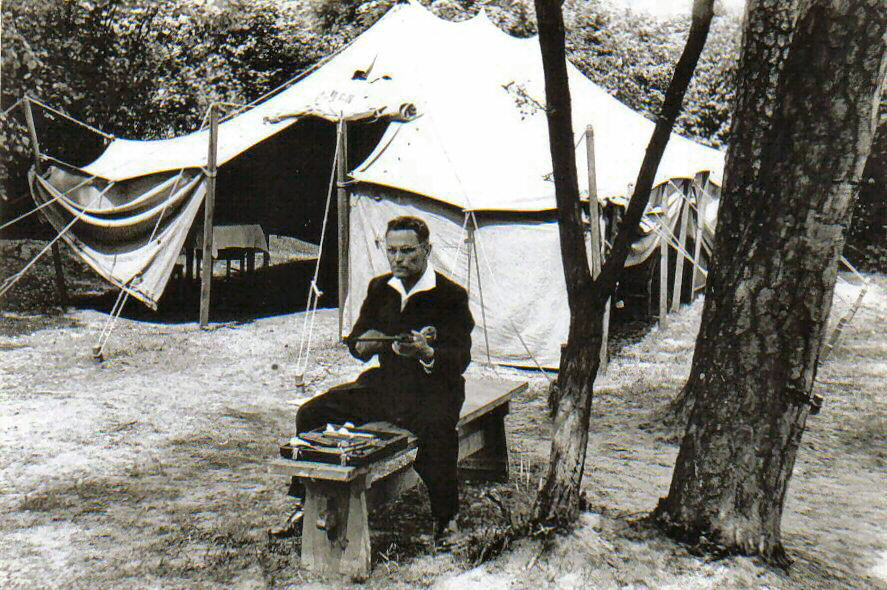
Takács preparing for shooting in Poland-Hungary-Yugoslavia competition in Bydgoszcz, Poland in 1961

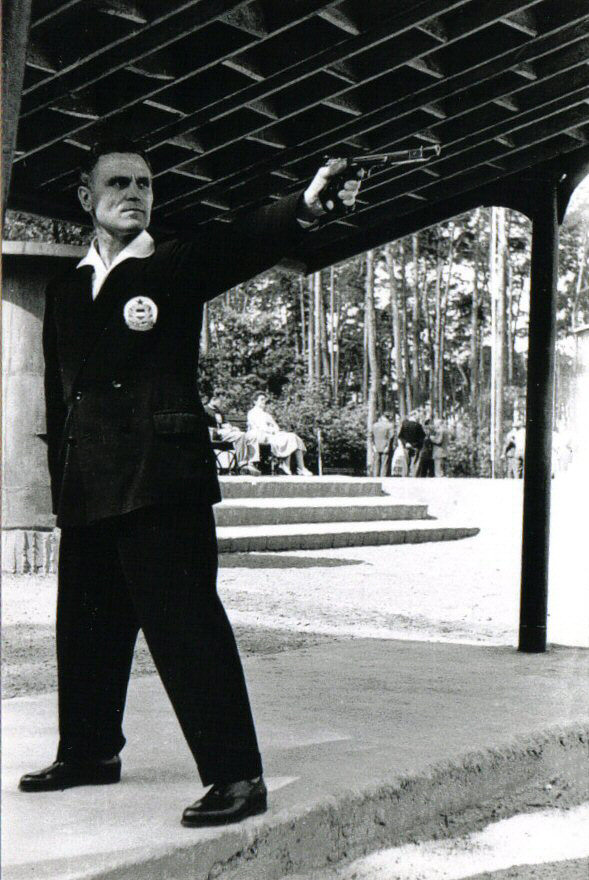
Takács shooting in Poland-Hungary-Yugoslavia competition in Bydgoszcz in 1961

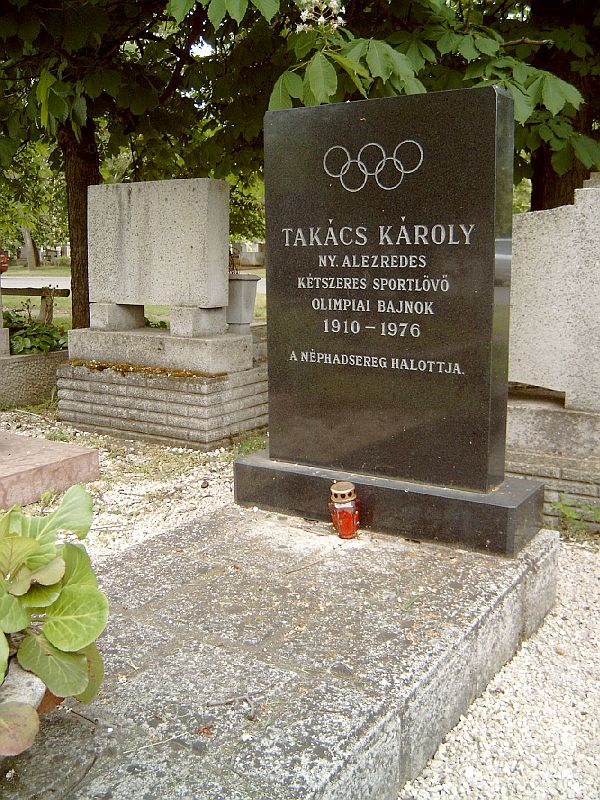
Takács's gravestone in Budapest
