= Proft =

Proft is a surname of German origin which is derived as a reduced form from either prophet or provost. Notable people with this name include:

- Dan Proft (born 1972), an American businessperson, writer and radio talk show host
- Miroslav Proft (1923–2011), a Czech sports shooter
- Pat Proft (born 1947), an American comedy writer and actor
- Werner Proft (1901–1989), a German field hockey player
