= Edgar Basel =

German boxer

Olympic medal record

Men's Boxing

Representing Germany
Silver medal – second place	1952 Helsinki	Flyweight

Edgar Basel (1 November 1930 in Mannheim – 7 September 1977) was a boxer from Germany, who won the silver medal in the flyweight division (– 51 kg) at the 1952 Summer Olympics in Helsinki.

== Amateur career ==
Basel had an outstanding amateur career. He was a five time German amateur flyweight champion (1951–1952, 1954–1956), and in 1955 he won the European Championship in Berlin (West).

=== Olympic results ===
Edgar Basel (West Germany) was a boxing silver medalist in the flyweight division at the 1952 Helsinki Olympics. Here are his results:

- Round of 16: Defeated Henryk Kukier (Poland) on points (3–0)
- Quarterfinal: defeated Torbjørn Clausen (Norway) by third-round knockout
- Semifinal: Defeated Anatoli Bulakov (Soviet Union) on points (2–1)
- Final: Lost to Nate Brooks (USA) on points (0–3)

Edgar Basel (West Germany) competed as a flyweight boxer at the 1956 Melbourne Olympics. Here are his results:

- Round of 32: Lost to Vladimir Stolnikov (Soviet Union) on points
