= Nate Brooks =

Nate Brooks may refer to:

- Nate Brooks (boxer), (1933–2020), American gold medal winning boxer at the 1952 Olympics
- Nate Brooks (American football) (born 1996), American football cornerback
- Nathan C. Brooks (1809–1898), American educator, historian, and poet
