= Jesús Tello =

Mexican boxer (born 1934)

Personal information
- Nationality: Mexican
- Born: 28 November 1934 (age 90)

Sport
- Sport: Boxing

Jesús Tello (born 28 November 1934) is a Mexican boxer. He competed in the men's flyweight event at the 1952 Summer Olympics. In his first fight, he lost to Leslie Donovan Perera Handunge of Ceylon.
