= Hein van der Zee =

Dutch boxer (1929–1991)

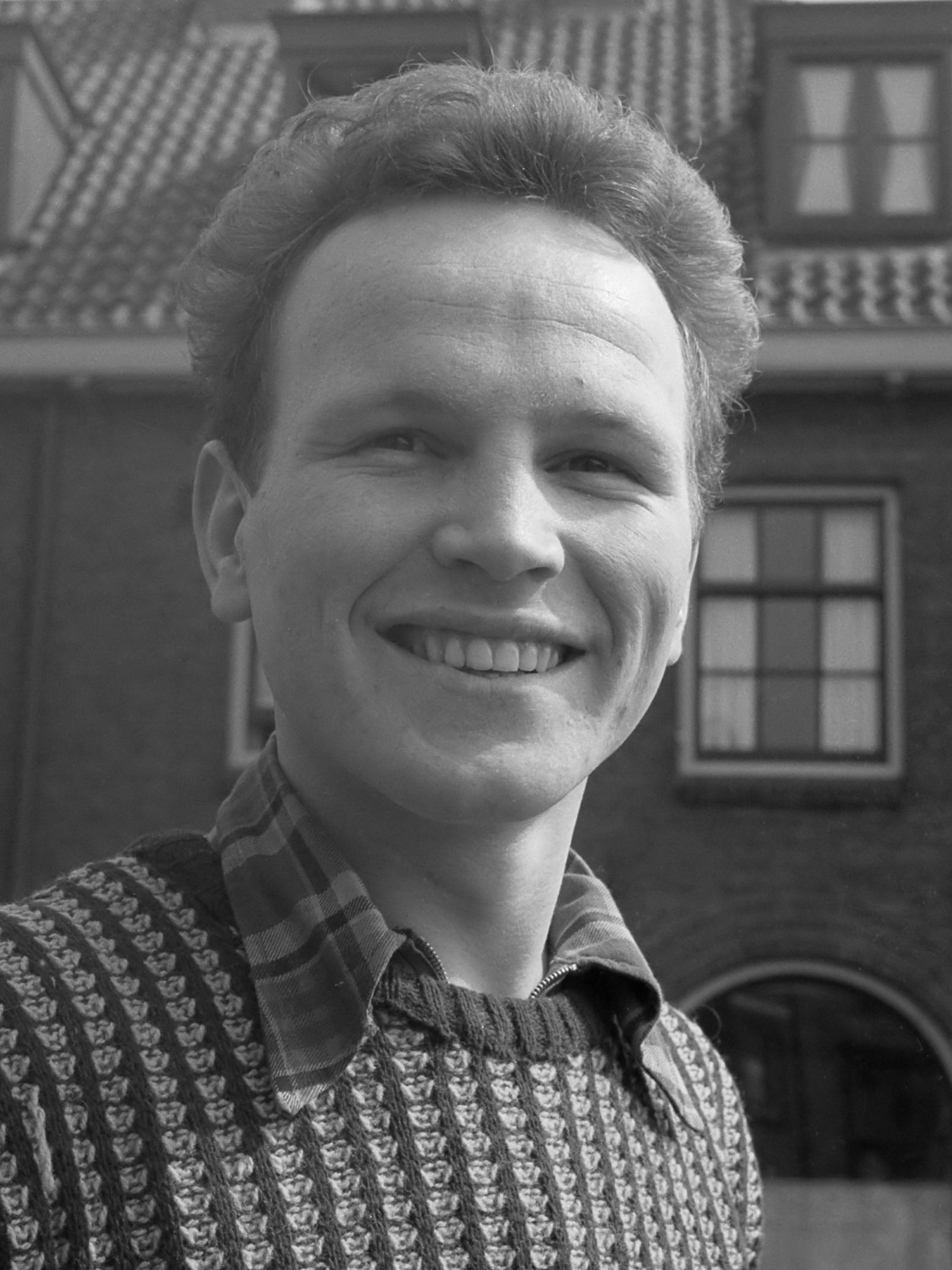
Hein van der Zee (1952)

Hendrik ("Hein") van der Zee (September 6, 1929 in Amsterdam – December 5, 1991 in Oostzaan) was a boxer from the Netherlands, who competed for his native country at the 1952 Summer Olympics in Helsinki, Finland. There he was defeated in the first round of the Men's Flyweight (–51 kg) division by Anatoli Bulakov of the Soviet Union.

== 1952 Olympic results ==
Below is the record of Hein van der Zee, a Dutch flyweight boxer who competed at the 1952 Helsinki Olympics:

- Round of 32: lost to Anatoli Bulakov (Soviet Union) by decision, 0-3
