= Roland Johansson =

Roland Johansson may refer to:

- Roland Johansson (boxer), Swedish boxer
- Roland Johansson (swimmer), Swedish swimmer
