= Ernesto Rivera =

Ernesto Rivera may refer to:

- Ernesto Rivera (sport shooter)
- Ernesto Rivera (racing driver)
- Ernesto Rivera (One Life to Live)
