= Carlos Rodríguez (sport shooter) =

Mexican sports shooter

Personal information
- Born: 7 January 1909
- Died: 17 October 1986 (aged 77)

Sport
- Sport: Sports shooting

Carlos Rodríguez (7 January 1909 – 17 October 1986) was a Mexican sports shooter. He competed in the 25 m pistol event at the 1952 Summer Olympics.
