= Vasily Frolov =

Soviet sports shooter (born 1926)

Personal information
- Full name: Vasily Ivanovich Frolov
- Born: 1926

Sport
- Sport: Sports shooting

Vasily Frolov (born 1926) is a Soviet former sports shooter. He competed in the 25 m pistol event at the 1952 Summer Olympics.
