= Sakti Mazumdar =

Indian boxer (1931–2021)

Personal information
- Nationality: Indian
- Born: 13 November 1931; Calcutta, Bengal Presidency, British India
- Died: 21 May 2021 (aged 89); Kolkata, India

Sport
- Sport: Boxing

Sakti Mazumdar (13 November 1931 – 21 May 2021) was an Indian boxer. He competed in the men's flyweight event at the 1952 Summer Olympics. In his first fight he beat Nguyen Van Cua of Vietnam by walkover, before being eliminated by Han Soo-ann of South Korea. He died on 21 May 2021 from a heart attack in his home in the Ballygunge area of Kolkata.
