= Ambrus Balogh =

Hungarian sport shooter (1915–1978)

Personal information
- Born: 12 August 1915 Csengerújfalu, Austria-Hungary
- Died: 6 July 1978 (aged 62) Budapest, Hungary

Sport
- Sport: Sports shooting
Medal record
Men's shooting
Representing Hungary
Olympic Games
Bronze medal – third place	1952 Helsinki	50 metre pistol

Ambrus Balogh (12 August 1915 – 6 July 1978) was a Hungarian sport shooter who competed at the 1948 Summer Olympics, 1952 Summer Olympics and 1960 Summer Olympics. He won a bronze medal at the 1952 Games.
