= Ludwig Leupold =

German sports shooter

Personal information
- Born: 18 July 1907
- Died: 16 August 1993 (aged 86)

Sport
- Sport: Sports shooting

Ludwig Leupold (18 July 1907 – 16 August 1993) was a German sports shooter. He competed in the 25 m pistol event at the 1952 Summer Olympics.
