= Abdel Amid Boutefnouchet =

French boxer

Personal information
- Nationality: French
- Born: 15 January 1932 (age 93)

Sport
- Sport: Boxing

Abdel Amid Boutefnouchet (born 15 January 1932) is a French boxer. He competed in the men's flyweight event at the 1952 Summer Olympics. At the 1952 Summer Olympics, he lost to Dai Dower of Great Britain.
