= Oiva Tylli =

Finnish sports shooter

Personal information
- Born: 21 February 1914 Virolahti, Finland
- Died: 16 June 1975 (aged 61) Helsinki, Finland

Sport
- Sport: Sports shooting

Oiva Tylli (21 February 1914 – 16 June 1975) was a Finnish sports shooter. He competed in the 50 m pistol event at the 1952 Summer Olympics.
