= Pavle Šovljanski =

Serbian boxer (1927–1995)

Personal information
- Nationality: Serbian
- Born: 3 November 1927 Palić, Yugoslavia
- Died: 21 July 1995 (aged 67) Belgrade, Yugoslavia

Sport
- Sport: Boxing

Pavle Šovljanski (3 November 1927 – 21 July 1995) was a Serbian boxer. He competed in the men's light welterweight event at the 1952 Summer Olympics.
