= Jean Paternotte =

Belgian boxer

Personal information
- Nationality: Belgian
- Born: 18 June 1931
- Died: January 2009 (aged 77)

Sport
- Sport: Boxing

Jean Paternotte (18 June 1931 – January 2009) was a Belgian boxer. He competed in the men's light welterweight event at the 1952 Summer Olympics.
