= Todor Stanchev =

Bulgarian sports shooter

Personal information
- Born: 9 August 1921
- Died: 2002 (aged 80–81)

Sport
- Sport: Sports shooting

Todor Stanchev (Bulgarian: Тодор Станчев, 9 August 1921 – 2002) was a Bulgarian sports shooter. He competed in the 25 m pistol event at the 1952 Summer Olympics.
