= René Weissmann =

French boxer

Personal information
- Nationality: French
- Born: 2 January 1930; Strasbourg, France
- Died: 28 October 1986 (aged 56); Ispoure, France

Sport
- Sport: Boxing

Jean René Weissmann (2 January 1930 – 28 October 1986) was a French boxer. He competed in the men's light welterweight event at the 1952 Summer Olympics.
