= Herbert Schilling =

German boxer

Personal information
- Nationality: German
- Born: 20 June 1930; Frankfurt, Germany
- Died: 24 October 2004 (aged 74); Frankfurt, Germany

Sport
- Sport: Boxing

Herbert Schilling (20 June 1930 – 24 October 2004) was a German boxer. He competed in the men's light welterweight event at the 1952 Summer Olympics. In 1951 he won the European Amateur Boxing Championships in Milan.
