= Ronald Guy =

British sports shooter

Personal information
- Born: 3 November 1912 Oxford, England
- Died: 4 August 2005 (aged 92)

Sport
- Sport: Sports shooting

Ronald Guy (3 November 1912 – 4 August 2005) was a British sports shooter. He competed in the 50 m pistol event at the 1952 Summer Olympics.
