= William White (sport shooter) =

British sports shooter

Personal information
- Born: 1 October 1912 Hackney, London, England
- Died: 21 May 2011 (aged 98)

Sport
- Sport: Sports shooting

William White (1 October 1912 – 21 May 2011) was a British sports shooter. He competed in the 50 m pistol event at the 1952 Summer Olympics.
