= Edvard Delorenco =

Yugoslav sports shooter

Personal information
- Born: 31 January 1921 Ljubljana, Yugoslavia
- Died: 1971 (aged 49–50)

Sport
- Sport: Sports shooting

Edvard Delorenco (31 January 1921 – 1971) was a Yugoslav sports shooter. He competed in the 50 m pistol event at the 1952 Summer Olympics.
