= Basil Thompson (boxer) =

Burmese boxer

Personal information
- Full name: Basil Clement Thompson
- Nationality: Burmese
- Born: 23 November 1934; Rangoon, Burma, British India
- Died: 13 March 2011 (aged 76); Deer Park, Texas, USA

Sport
- Sport: Boxing

Basil Clement Thompson (23 November 1934 – 13 March 2011) was an Anglo-Burmese boxer. He competed in the men's flyweight event at the 1952 Summer Olympics. He lost to Al Asuncion of the Philippines in his first match.
