= Trudovye Rezervy =

The emblem of the VSS Trudovye Rezervy

Trudovye Rezervy (Russian: Трудовые резервы; English: Workforce/Labour Reserves) was one of the Voluntary Sports Societies of the USSR. The society was created during the World War II in 1943 and existed until dissolution of the Soviet Union, being officially disbanded in summer of 1992. The Russian SFSR branch of sports society was transformed into "Yunost Rossii" sports society. In 2018 Trudovye Rezervy as a sports society was revived in the Russian Federation.

The original Soviet sports society was to involve in physical culture and sports the students of the country's vocational schools, while higher education students were admitted to Burevestnik ("Storm-petrel") society. Like its sister organisations, the society had eponymous sports teams and facilities. On the system of mass Soviet vocational training in 1940-59 see Государственные трудовые резервы СССР.

== Notable members ==
- Svetlana Boginskaya (artistic gymnastics)
- Yelena Belevskaya (athletics)
- Marina Zhirova (athletics)
- Yevgeniy Ivchenko (athletics)
- Vladimir Lovetskiy (athletics)
- Valeriy Podluzhniy (athletics)
- Oleg Grigoryev (boxing)
- Boris Kuznetsov (boxing)
- Viktor Mednov (boxing)
- Danas Pozniakas (boxing)
- Vassily Solomin (boxing)
- Stanislav Stepashkin (boxing)
- David Torosyan (boxing)
- Vladimir Yengibaryan (boxing)
- Ivans Klementjevs (canoeing)
- Liliya Vassilchenko (cross-country skiing)
- Dmitri Bulykin (football)
