= Hugo Lundkvist =

Swedish sports shooter

Personal information
- Born: 17 May 1913 Lerum, Sweden
- Died: 7 February 1998 (aged 84) Kungsbacka, Sweden

Sport
- Sport: Sports shooting

Hugo Lundkvist (17 May 1913 – 7 February 1998) was a Swedish sports shooter. He competed in the 50 m pistol event at the 1952 Summer Olympics.
