= Vasily Novikov =

Soviet sports shooter (born 1929)

Personal information
- Born: 1929

Sport
- Sport: Sports shooting

Vasily Novikov (born 1929) is a Soviet former sports shooter. He competed in the 25 m pistol event at the 1952 Summer Olympics.
