= Lewis Evans =

Lewis Evans may refer to:

- Lewis Evans (controversialist) (fl. 1574), Welsh controversialist
- Lewis Evans (surveyor) (c. 1700–1756), Welsh colonial surveyor and geographer
- Lewis Evans (mathematician) (1755–1827), Welsh mathematician
- Lewis H. Evans (1832–1904), American politician from Pennsylvania
- Lewis Evans (collector) (1853–1930), British businessman and scientific instrument collector
- Lewis Pugh Evans (1881–1962), British general and World War I Victoria Cross recipient
- Lewis Evans (bishop) (1904–1996), Anglican bishop of Barbados
- Lewis Evans (rugby union) (born 1987), Welsh rugby union player
- Lewis Evans (musician), British musician

== See also ==
- Louis E. Atkinson (1841–1910), American physician, attorney and Republican politician
- Stuart Lewis-Evans (1930–1958), British racing driver
