= Luciano Galesi =

Italian sports shooter

Personal information
- Born: 8 November 1926 Collebeato, Italy
- Died: 12 May 2002 (aged 75)

Sport
- Sport: Sports shooting

Luciano Galesi (8 November 1926 – 12 May 2002) was an Italian sports shooter. He competed in the 50 m pistol event at the 1952 Summer Olympics.
