= Ángel León Gozalo =

Spanish sport shooter (1907–1979)

Ángel León
Personal information
- Born: 2 October 1907 Villalón de Campos, Valladolid, Spain
- Died: 10 August 1979 (aged 71) Madrid, Spain
- Height: 1.73 m (5 ft 8 in)
- Weight: 72 kg (159 lb)

Sport
- Sport: Shooting
Medal record
Representing Spain
Olympics
Silver medal – second place	1952 Helsinki	50 m pistol
ISSF World Shooting Championships
Bronze medal – third place	1949 Buenos Aires	50 m pistol

Ángel León Gozalo (2 October 1907 – 10 August 1979) was a Spanish sport shooter. He competed at the 1948, 1952 and 1960 Olympics in the 50 m pistol event and finished in 6th, 2nd and 18th place, respectively. Léon Gozalo worked as a shooting instructor with the police in Madrid.
