= Renato Sacchi =

Italian sports shooter (1928–2020)

Personal information
- Born: 11 December 1928
- Died: 15 October 2020 (aged 91)

Sport
- Sport: Sports shooting

Renato Sacchi (11 December 1928 – 15 October 2020) was an Italian sports shooter. He competed in the 50 m pistol event at the 1952 Summer Olympics.
