= Emilio Álava =

Spanish sports shooter

Personal information
- Born: 5 May 1889 Vitoria-Gasteiz, Spain
- Died: 18 April 1974 (aged 84) Vitoria, Spain

Sport
- Sport: Sports shooting

Emilio Álava (5 May 1889 – 18 April 1974) was a sports shooter from Spain. He competed in the 25 m pistol event at the 1952 Summer Olympics.
