= Konstantin Martazov =

Soviet sports shooter

Personal information
- Born: 1919
- Died: 1993 (aged 73–74)

Sport
- Sport: Sports shooting

Konstantin Martazov (1919 – 1993) was a Soviet sports shooter. He competed in the 50 m pistol event at the 1952 Summer Olympics.
