= Nate Brooks (boxer) =

American boxer (1933–2020)

Personal information
- Full name: Nathan Eugene Brooks
- Born: August 4, 1933 Cleveland, Ohio, U.S.
- Died: April 14, 2020 (aged 86)
Medal record
Men's boxing
Representing the United States
Olympic Games
Gold medal – first place	1952 Helsinki	Flyweight

Nathan Eugene Brooks (August 4, 1933 – April 14, 2020) was a boxer from the United States, who won the gold medal in the flyweight division (– 51 kg) at the 1952 Summer Olympics in Helsinki.

== Early life ==
Brooks grew up in the Miles Heights neighborhood on the southeast side of Cleveland, Ohio. He was the 8th of 11 children of his parents, Frank and Mary Brooks. He graduated from John Adams High School.

== Amateur career ==
Brooks had an outstanding career. Despite losing the National AAU flyweight crown in 1949 to Johnny Ortega, Brooks won titles at the Chicago Golden Gloves in 1950 and 1951. Brooks was the 1952 Olympic Flyweight Champion, defeating Edgar Basel of West Germany in the final on a 3-0 decision.

=== Olympic results ===
Below is the Olympic record of Nate Brooks, an American flyweight boxer who competed at the 1952 Helsinki Olympics:

- Round of 32: Defeated Risto Luukkonen (Finland) 3-0
- Round of 16: Defeated Alfred Zima (Austria) 3-0
- Quarterfinal: Defeated Mircea Dobrescu (Romania) 2-1
- Semifinal: Defeated Willie Toweel (South Africa) 3-0
- Final: Defeated Edgar Basel (West Germany) 3-0 (won gold medal)

== Professional career ==
Brooks turned pro in 1953 and had limited success. He retired in 1958 after a string of seven losses, having won 10 and lost 9 with 4 KO in his career.

== Life after boxing ==
Towards the end of his professional career Brooks began attending law school at Ohio State University. He later worked as a survey engineer at the Ohio Department of Transportation for 32 years. Brooks died on April 14, 2020.
