= Roy Keenan =

Canadian boxer

Personal information
- Born: 26 August 1930; Montreal, Quebec, Canada
- Died: 21 May 2003 (aged 72); Montreal, Quebec, Canada

Sport
- Sport: Boxing
- Weight class: Light welterweight

Roy Keenan (26 August 1930 – 21 May 2003) was a Canadian boxer. He competed in the men's light welterweight event at the 1952 Summer Olympics. His brother, Jack also was a boxer, competing at the 1948 Summer Olympics.
