= Guilherme Cavalcanti =

Brazilian sports shooter

Personal information
- Born: 1 February 1921
- Died: 30 January 2006 (aged 84)

Sport
- Sport: Sports shooting

Guilherme Cavalcanti (1 February 1921 – 30 January 2006) was a Brazilian sports shooter. He competed in the 25 m pistol event at the 1952 Summer Olympics.
