= Veli-Jussi Hölsö =

Finnish sports shooter

Personal information
- Born: 27 May 1919 Vaasa, Finland
- Died: 20 September 1987 (aged 68) Helsinki, Finland

Sport
- Sport: Sports shooting

Veli-Jussi Hölsö (27 May 1919 – 20 September 1987) was a Finnish sports shooter. He competed in the 25 m pistol event at the 1952 Summer Olympics.
