= Fritz Krempel =

German sports shooter

Personal information
- Born: 23 November 1905
- Died: 8 April 1984 (aged 78)

Sport
- Sport: Sports shooting

Fritz Krempel (23 November 1905 – 8 April 1984) was a German sports shooter. He competed in the 50 m pistol event at the 1952 Summer Olympics.
