= Nikolay Khristozov =

Bulgarian sports shooter

Personal information
- Native name: Николай Тенев Христозов
- Full name: Nikolay Tenev Khristozov
- Born: 5 March 1915

Sport
- Sport: Sports shooting

Nikolay Tenev Khristozov (Bulgarian: Николай Тенев Христозов, born 5 March 1915, date of death unknown) was a Bulgarian sports shooter. He competed in the 50 meter pistol event at the 1952 Summer Olympics.
