= Rolf Klementsen =

Norwegian sports shooter (1913–1983)

Personal information
- Born: 28 March 1913 Oslo, Norway
- Died: 5 February 1983 (aged 69) Oslo, Norway

Sport
- Sport: Sports shooting

Rolf Klementsen (28 March 1913 – 5 February 1983) was a Norwegian sports shooter. He competed in the 50 m pistol event at the 1952 Summer Olympics.
