= Norman Jones (boxer) =

Australian boxer (b. 1930)

Personal information
- Nationality: Australian
- Born: 15 January 1930
- Died: 23 March 1999 (aged 69)

Sport
- Sport: Boxing

Norman Jones (15 January 1930 – 23 March 1999) was an Australian boxer. He competed in the men's light welterweight event at the 1952 Summer Olympics.
