= Fathi Abdel Rahman =

Egyptian boxer (born 1932)

Personal information
- Nationality: Egyptian
- Born: 16 April 1932 (age 93)

Sport
- Sport: Boxing

Fathi Ali Abdel Rahman (born 16 April 1932) is an Egyptian boxer. He competed in the welterweight division at the 1952 Summer Olympics.
