= Stoyan Popov =

Bulgarian sports shooter

Personal information
- Born: 25 July 1917

Sport
- Sport: Sports shooting

Stoyan Popov (Bulgarian: Стоян Попов, born 25 July 1917, date of death unknown) was a Bulgarian sports shooter. He competed in the 50 m pistol event at the 1952 Summer Olympics.
