= Ludovic Heraud =

French sports shooter

Personal information
- Born: 1 January 1913 Toulouse, France
- Died: 15 December 2007 (aged 94) Nice, France

Sport
- Sport: Sports shooting

Jean Gabriel Silvain Olivier Ludovic Heraud (1 January 1913 – 15 December 2007) was a French sports shooter. He competed in the 25 m pistol event at the 1952 Summer Olympics.
