= Mohamed Ahmed Aly =

Egyptian sports shooter

Personal information
- Born: 1920
- Died: 29 January 2003 (aged 82–83)

Sport
- Sport: Sports shooting

Mohamed Ahmed Aly (1920 – 29 January 2003) was an Egyptian sports shooter. He competed in the 50 m pistol event at the 1952 Summer Olympics.
