= Rudolf Vuk =

Yugoslav sports shooter (1913–1962)

Personal information
- Born: 9 September 1913 Krapina-Zagorje County, Yugoslavia
- Died: 7 August 1962 (aged 48) Varaždin, Yugoslavia

Sport
- Sport: Sports shooting

Rudolf Vuk (9 September 1913 – 7 August 1962) was a Croatian sports shooter. He competed for Yugoslavia in the 50 m pistol event at the 1952 Summer Olympics.
