= Roger Tauvel =

French sports shooter

Personal information
- Born: 8 November 1902 Le Havre, France
- Died: 4 August 1976 (aged 73) Seillans, France

Sport
- Sport: Sports shooting

Roger Eugene Robert Tauvel (8 November 1902 – 4 August 1976) was a French sports shooter. He competed in the 50 m pistol event at the 1952 Summer Olympics.
