= Albino de Jesus =

Portuguese sports shooter

Personal information
- Born: 13 August 1913

Sport
- Sport: Sports shooting

Albino de Jesus (13 August 1913 – 24 November 1978) was a Portuguese sports shooter. He competed in the 25 m pistol event at the 1952 Summer Olympics.
