= Gösta Pihl =

Swedish sports shooter

Personal information
- Born: 20 May 1907 Gävle, Sweden
- Died: 20 September 1992 (aged 85) Gothenburg, Sweden

Sport
- Sport: Sports shooting

Gösta Pihl (20 May 1907 – 20 September 1992) was a Swedish sports shooter. He competed in the 25 m pistol event at the 1952 Summer Olympics.
