= Giorgio Pennacchietti =

Italian sports shooter

Personal information
- Born: 12 October 1931 (age 94) Bologna, Italy

Sport
- Sport: Sports shooting

Giorgio Pennacchietti (born 21 October 1931) is an Italian former sports shooter. He competed in the 25 m pistol event at the 1952 Summer Olympics.
