= Ladislav Ondřej =

Czech sport shooter

Personal information
- Born: 26 August 1912

Sport
- Sport: Sport shooting

Ladislav Ondřej (26 August 1912 – ?) was a Czech sport shooter. He competed in the 25 m pistol event at the 1952 Summer Olympics.
