= Oddvar Wenner Nilssen =

Norwegian sports shooter (1920–1979)

Personal information
- Born: 22 October 1920 Oslo, Norway
- Died: 15 April 1979 (aged 58) Bærum, Norway

Sport
- Sport: Sports shooting

Oddvar Wenner Nilssen (22 October 1920 – 15 April 1979) was a Norwegian sports shooter. He competed in the 25 m pistol event at the 1952 Summer Olympics. He ranked 37th in the event.
