= José Rua =

Puerto Rican sports shooter

Personal information
- Born: 8 December 1911 San Germán, Puerto Rico
- Died: 5 July 2002 (aged 90) Dallas, Texas, United States

Sport
- Sport: Sports shooting

José Rua (8 December 1911 – 5 July 2002) was a Puerto Rican sports shooter. He competed in the 25 m pistol event at the 1952 Summer Olympics. Rua also won a gold medal at the 1954 Central American and Caribbean Games.
