= Salomon Carrizales =

Venezuelan boxer (1933–2014)

Personal information
- Nationality: Venezuelan
- Born: 8 February 1933
- Died: 2014 (aged 80–81)

Sport
- Sport: Boxing

Salomon Carrizales Montenegro (8 February 1933 – 2014) was a Venezuelan boxer. He competed in the men's light welterweight event at the 1952 Summer Olympics. Carrizales died in 2014.
