= Lewis Evans (controversialist) =

Welsh Catholic controversialist

Lewis Evans (fl. 1574), was a Welsh controversialist, or polemicist, who was educated at Oxford and initially supportive of the Roman Catholic cause in England during the Reformation. He fled to Antwerp, where he translated a work from Latin. After being imprisoned in London upon his return, he reconciled to the established Church of England. He published books in 1568 and 1570 that virulently attacked the Roman Catholic Church.

== Life and career ==
Evans, a native of Monmouthshire, was educated at Oxford, apparently at Christ Church, where he proceeded B.A. 1554, M.A. 1557, and B.D. 1562. He afterwards moved to London, where his zeal in the Roman Catholic cause brought him into conflict with Bishop Grindal. He was forced to flee the country.

Settling at Antwerp, he worked to translate the Tabulæ vigentium ... hæreseon of Willem van der Lindt, Bishop of Roermond, into English. This he published at Antwerp in 1565 with the title The Betraying of the Beastliness of the Heretics and a defiant address to Grindal.

Venturing back to London, Evans was thrown into prison. After he was reconciled to the Church of England by some of his friends, he "did, to shew his zeal for the love he had to it, write and publish a book as full of ill language against the Roman catholics as the other was full of good for them," entitled The Castle of Christianitie, detecting the long erring estate, as vvell of the Romaine Church, as of the Byshop of Rome: together with the Defence of the Catholique Faith, London, 1568.

In dedicating his treatise to Queen Elizabeth I, he wrote:

"I my selfe haue once drunke (before your Maiesties great clemencie I confesse) of the puddell of ignorancy, of the mudde of idolatrie, of the ponde of superstition, of the lake of self will, blindenesse, disobedience, & obstinacie."

Roman Catholics were greatly offended, saying that Evans, to use his own words, "had reuolted from the Gospell, & was agayne gonne beyonde the seas." These reports being constantly told to Evans while he was staying at Oxford, "not by any mean man, but by the learnest;" he found on reaching London "hovve yt vvas in the mouthes of manye, that he vvas deade." Two years later he published a still more virulent polemical attack against the church of Rome, which he entitled The Hatefull Hypocrisie and Rebellion of the Romishe Prelacie, London, 1570.

== Other works ==
- A short Treatise of the Mistery of the Eucharist, London, 1569.
- A brief Answer to a short trifling Treatise of late set forth in the Britaine Tongue, written by one Clinnock at Rome, and printed at Millain, and lately spread secretly abroad in Wales, London, 1571. (ref: Thomas Tanner, Bibliotheca Britannico-Hibernica (London: Societatis ad Literas Promovendas, 1748), p. 270.)

Evans revised and made considerable additions to a new edition of John Withals' dictionary, entitled A Shorte Dictionarie most profitable for yong Beginners, the seconde tyme corrected, and augmented with diuerse Phrasys, & other thinges necessarie therevnto added. By Lewys Euans, London, 1574. In inscribing his work to the Earl of Leicester, Evans hints at poverty and want of suitable employment. The Dictionarie went through several editions; the edition of 1586 was augmented "with more than six hundred rythmicall verses" written by Abraham Fleming.
