= Maria Teresa de Noronha =

Portuguese aristocrat and fado singer

- Countess of Sabrosa
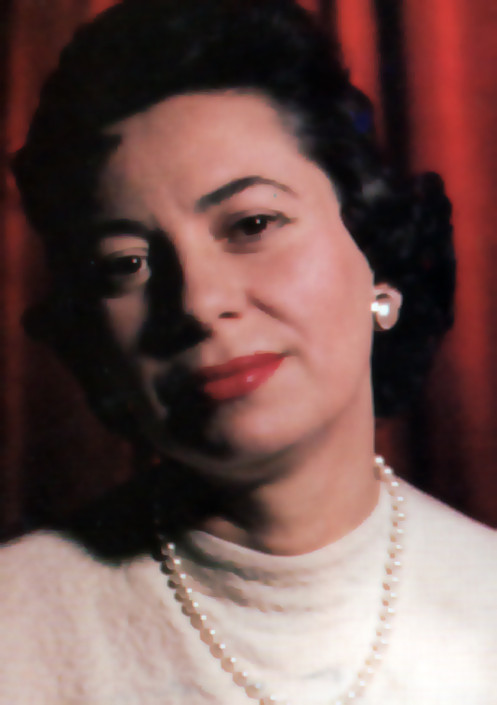

Countess of Sabrosa
- Full name: Maria Teresa do Carmo de Noronha
- Noble family: Noronha
- Occupation: Fadista, Fidalga

D. Maria Teresa do Carmo de Noronha, (November 7, 1918, Lisbon – July 4, 1993) was a Portuguese aristocrat and a fado singer. As a granddaughter of the Counts of Paraty and Belmonte, she belonged to a family of the most ancient Nobility in the Iberian Peninsula, tracing her roots to the Royal Houses of both Portugal and Castile from the mid-14th century. Her artistic career spanned over 30 years and hers is considered one of the most unusual and beautiful fado voices. Her status as a fidalga meant, in the context of a conservative early 20th century Portugal, that she faced severe restrictions in having a professional artistic career. As such, she did not enjoy the projection of other great fadistas of her time.

== Childhood and youth ==
According to her surviving relatives, Maria Teresa de Noronha showed from her childhood a very beautiful voice, often singing in church choirs, though she did not take any voice lessons. According to Raul Nery, her voice is one of those rare examples of natural vocal placement based on the diaphragm and taking advantage of the resonance provided by the skull – which may have arisen from her early contact with liturgical musical repertoire, then still very operatic in nature.

At the time of her youth, Fado had already entered the aristocratic environment, and was no longer confined to the marginal way of life of Lisbon's taverns, dockyards and brothels. Her great-granduncle D. João do Carmo de Noronha and her brother D. Vasco de Noronha, as well as her acquaintances D. Pedro and D. António de Bragança (House of Lafões), were all renowned amateur fadistas. She began singing the Fado in the intimate circle of her family and friends but soon the fame of her proven talent spread out.

== Career and Marriage ==
In 1938, at the age of 20, Maria Teresa de Noronha was invited by the Portuguese broadcasting company (Emissora Nacional) to perform at a regular biweekly fado program. She did so uninterruptedly until 1961, with the exception of a four-year pause following her marriage in December 1947 to the Count of Sabrosa, D. José António Guimarães Serôdio, himself an amateur guitarist and, later on, a distinguished composer of fados.

Maria Teresa de Noronha retired from her artistic career in 1961, and thus discontinued her E.N. program. She nevertheless took on several invitations to sing in Monaco (both at the Monte Carlo casino and privately for Princes Rainier and Grace at the Palace), London (BBC and Casa de Portugal), at an homage to Alfredo Marceneiro in 1963 and in RTP in 1968, while continuing to record LPs until 1971.

== Retirement and later years ==
In 1973, she discontinued even her informal public performances and her last public appearance took place in 1976, at the Fado house Picadeiro in Cascais. Maria Teresa de Noronha died of prolonged disease at her house of São Pedro de Sintra on July 5, 1993.

== Unique Voice in Fado ==
Maria Teresa de Noronha's particularity in fado is due to her voice, expressive force and her synchronization with the instruments.

The expressive force is a must for those rigorosos like M.T. Noronha, who interpreted almost exclusively fados castiços, in which the music is repeated four to five times. The challenge for the virtuous singer is to stylize, i.e. to vary the melodic design of each stanza according to the emotional suggestions of the lyrics themselves. Maria Teresa de Noronha's style was to introduce the fados with a simple and clear melody and subsequently to insert a variety of dynamic nuances, hinting the main words with either more intensity, an intimate whisper or briefly suspending her voice. Generally it isn't until the final stanza that the full climax is reached.

== Records ==
Her first 78 rpm records date back to the early 1940s, with Pinto Coelho as guitarra and Abel Negrão as Viola. In 1952, besides resuming her E.N. program, M.T. Noronha recorded a new 78 rpm series, with Raul Nery at the guitarra and Joaquim do Vale at the viola. These same musicians accompanied her throughout her career and were reinforced from 1959 with the remnant members of the Raul Nery Guitar Ensamble. A series of 15 LPs were recorded from then on.
