= Gianbattista Alfonsetti =

Italian boxer (1929–2004)

Personal information
- Nationality: Italian
- Born: 9 October 1929; Tempera, Italy
- Died: 21 July 2004 (aged 74); Rome, Italy

Sport
- Sport: Boxing

Gianbattista Alfonsetti (9 October 1929 – 21 July 2004) was an Italian boxer. He competed in the men's light heavyweight event at the 1952 Summer Olympics.
