= Ahmed El-Minabawi =

Egyptian boxer (born 1928)

Personal information
- Nationality: Egyptian
- Born: 21 July 1928; Cairo, Kingdom of Egypt

Sport
- Sport: Boxing

Ahmed El-Minabawi (born 21 July 1928) was an Egyptian boxer. He competed in the men's heavyweight event at the 1952 Summer Olympics.
