= Risto Luukkonen =

Finnish boxer (1931-1967)

Personal information
- Nationality: Finnish
- Born: 31 July 1931; Tuusula, Finland
- Died: 12 August 1967 (aged 36); Helsinki, Finland

Sport
- Sport: Boxing

Risto Luukkonen (31 July 1931 – 12 August 1967) was a Finnish boxer. He competed in the men's flyweight event at the 1952 Summer Olympics. As a professional, he was the EBU's flyweight champion after defeating Spain's Young Martin by a 15 rounds decision on 4 September 1959.
