= Ernesto Herrero =

Cuban sports shooter

Personal information
- Born: 16 September 1893 Camagüey, Cuba

Sport
- Sport: Sports shooting

Ernesto Herrero (born 16 September 1893, date of death unknown) was a Cuban sports shooter. He competed in the 25 m pistol event at the 1952 Summer Olympics.
