= Szilárd Kun =

Hungarian sport shooter (1935–1987)

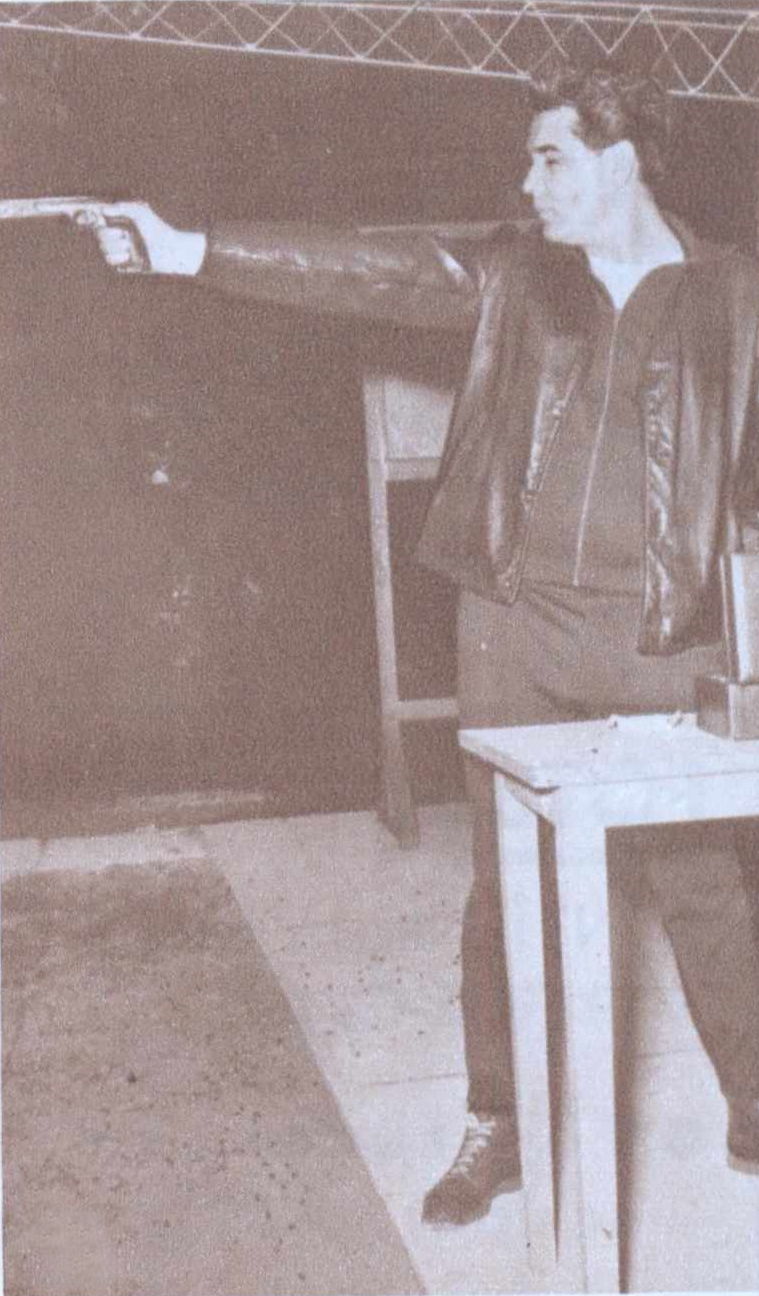
- Szilárd Kun

Personal information
- Born: 23 March 1935 Budapest, Hungary
- Died: 31 August 1987 (aged 52) Budapest, Hungary

Sport
- Country: Hungary
- Sport: Sports shooting
Medal record
Men's shooting
Representing Hungary
Olympic Games
Silver medal – second place	1952 Helsinki	Rapid fire pistol

Szilárd Kun (23 March 1935 – 31 August 1987) was a Hungarian sport shooter who competed in the 1952 Summer Olympics, in the 1956 Summer Olympics, in the 1964 Summer Olympics, in the 1968 Summer Olympics and in the 1972 Summer Olympics. He won a silver medal at the 1952 Games.
