= Ramiro Ortiz (sport shooter) =

Puerto Rican sports shooter

Personal information
- Born: 11 March 1903 Yabucoa, Puerto Rico
- Died: March 1982 San Juan, Puerto Rico

Sport
- Sport: Sports shooting

Ramiro Ortiz (11 March 1903 – March 1982) was a Puerto Rican sports shooter. He competed in the 50 m pistol event at the 1952 Summer Olympics.
