= Torbjørn Clausen =

Norwegian boxer

Personal information
- Nationality: Norwegian
- Born: 11 March 1931 Lørenskog, Norway
- Died: 23 November 2001 (aged 70)

Sport
- Sport: Boxing

Torbjørn Clausen (11 March 1931 – 23 December 2001) was a Norwegian boxer. He was born in Lørenskog. He competed at the 1952 Summer Olympics in Helsinki, where he shared fifth place in the flyweight class.

== 1952 Olympic results ==
Below is the record of Torbjørn Clausen, a Norwegian flyweight boxer who competed at the 1952 Helsinki Olympics:

- Round of 32: defeated Kjeld Steen (Denmark) by decision, 2–1
- Round of 16: bye
- Quarterfinal: lost to Edgar Basel (Germany) by a third-round technical knockout
