= Willie Toweel =

South African boxer (1934–2017)

Medal record

Men's Boxing

Representing South Africa

Olympic Games
Bronze medal – third place	1952 Helsinki	Flyweight

Willie Michael "Willie" Toweel (6 April 1934 – 25 December 2017) was a boxer from South Africa, who won the bronze medal in the flyweight division (– 51 kg) at the 1952 Summer Olympics in Helsinki, Finland.

== Personal life ==
Willie was born in Benoni, and was the brother of Alan, Jimmy, Fraser, Vic, Maurice, Maureen Toweel and Antoinette Moussallem; and the uncle of Paul Toweel.

== Amateur career ==
As an amateur, Willie won Junior and Senior South African boxing titles, and won the bronze medal at the 1952 Olympic Games. He lost to Nate Brooks of the United States, the eventual gold medalist.

== 1952 Olympic results ==
Below are the results of Willie Toweel, a South African boxer who competed in the flyweight division at the 1952 Helsinki Olympics.

- Round of 32: defeated Kornel Molnar (Hungary) by decision, 3–0.
- Round of 16: defeated Al Asuncion (Philippines) by decision, 2-1
- Quarterfinal: defeated Han Soo-An (South Korea) by decision, 3–0.
- Semifinal: lost to Nate Brooks (United States) by decision, 0–3. (was awarded a bronze medal)

== Professional career ==
He began his professional career in 1953. After notching up a few wins, Willie fought Matthew Raaff for the vacant South African Bantamweight title at Feather Market Hall in Port Elizabeth, and knocked Raaff out in the seventh round. On 22 May 1954, Toweel outpointed Tony Lombard over 12 rounds to win the vacant South African Featherweight Title.

Winning his next ten fights, Willie challenged Robert Cohen for the World Bantamweight title. They fought on 3 September 1955, at Rand Stadium in Johannesburg. Toweel was knocked down three times in the second round, twice for three counts, and once for no count. Toweel fought back courageously, and was also knocked down in the tenth round. The hard-fought world title bout resulted in a 15-round draw, with Cohen retaining his world title.

Moving up a division to Lightweight, Toweel faced rival Johnny 'Smiler' Van Rensburg for the British Empire and South African Lightweight Titles. In their first encounter, Toweel lost, retiring in the ninth round with hand and ankle injuries. Over the span of their careers, they would fight each other another five times, Willie winning the next three bouts with Van Rensburg, and their final bout wit each other ending in a draw over 15 rounds.

Willie was affected by tragedy when he fought 21-year-old South African Hubert Essakow on 19 March 1956, in defense of his South African Featherweight Title. Essakow sustained fatal brain injuries in the fight, and died 52 hours later after losing to Toweel by 11th-round knockout. Willie, being a religious man, seriously considered retirement from boxing. He often held back his attack on many of his future opponents, in fear he might hurt them. Late in his career, in the same venue where he fought Essakow, he was disqualified in a bout against Jannie Botes for a low blow. Afterwards, he said during the fight his memories of Essakow came flooding back, and he just wanted to find an excuse to get out of the ring.

With his management team behind him, Toweel continued to box, and racked up another seven wins, with a draw against Van Rensburg. Willie then fought in England, and defeated Dave Charnley on points over 15 rounds to defend his British Empire Lightweight Title. Toweel won his next eight fights before losing to Frenchman Guy Gracia by TKO in the seventh round on 23 April 1958, in Kelvin Hall, Glasgow. Willie had unfortunately been suffering with bad sinusitis before the fight. Willie got revenge 10 months later, defeating Gracia on points in Cape Town, South Africa.

After defeating Van Rensburg for the final time in Salisbury, Toweel faced Dave Charnley again. Struggling to the Lightweight weight limit, Toweel lost his British Empire Lightweight title by getting knocked out in the tenth round.

Moving up to welterweight, Toweel fought Len Matthews at Madison Square Garden on 20 November 1959. He was the first South African to top the bill there. Despite being knocked down twice in the eighth round, Willie fought brilliantly and won on points. Willie was beaten on points for the first time, losing a 10-round decision to Wally Swift in Nottingham on 7 December 1959.

Following the Swift fight, Willie gained two more wins in South Africa, over Julio Silvo and Fred Tiedt before beating Benny Niewenhuizen for the vacant South African Welterweight title, to win his fourth national title. On 17 September 1960, Toweel was disqualified against Jannie Botes, and lost his title. In his last professional ring appearance, Toweel fought future World Welterweight and Middleweight champion Emile Griffith at Madison Square Garden on 22 October 1960. Willie started well in the bout, but was stopped in the eighth round. This was his last fight. Toweel retired from boxing at age 26, with a career record of 46 wins, six losses and two draws, with 23 knockouts.

45 Wins (23 knockouts, 22 decisions), 6 Losses (3 knockouts, 3 decision), 2 Draws
Result	Record	Opponent	Type	Rounds	Date	Location	Notes
Lost	45–6	(United States Virgin Islands) Emile Griffith	TKO	10	22 October September 1960	(United States) Madison Square Garden, New York, USA	
Lost	45–5	(South Africa) Jannie Botes	DQ	12	17 September 1960	City Hall, Johannesburg, Gauteng, South Africa	
Win	45–3	(South Africa) Benny Nieuwenhuizen	PTS	12	27 August 1960	Market Hall, Welkom, Free State, South Africa	
Win	44–3	(Republic of Ireland) Fred Tiedt	PTS	10	16 July 1960	Icedrome, Durban, South Africa	
Win	43–3	(Mozambique) Julio Silvo	KO	10	16 April 1960	Icedrome, Durban, South Africa	
Lost	42–4	(United Kingdom) Wally Swift	PTS	10	7 December 1959	Ice Rink, Nottingham, United Kingdom	
Win	42–3	(United States) Len Matthews	SD	10	20 November 1959	(United States) Madison Square Garden, New York, USA	
Win	41–3	(United Kingdom) Paddy Graham	TKO	10	3 October 1959	Empire Pool, Wembley, United Kingdom	
Lost	40–3	(United Kingdom) Dave Charnley	KO	15	12 May 1959	Empire Pool, Wembley, United Kingdom	
Win	40–2	(South Africa) Johnny van Rensburg	PTS	10	21 March 1959	Raylton Sports Club, Salisbury, Rhodesia	
Win	39–2	(France) Guy Gracia	KO	10	24 February 1959	Green Point Stadium, Cape Town, South Africa	
Win	38–2	(France) Tony Garcia	KO	10	19 November 1958	Goodwood Hall, Cape Town, South Africa	
Lost	37–2	(France) Guy Gracia	TKO	10	23 April 1958	Kelvin Hall, Glasgow, United Kingdom	
Win	37–1	(France) Fernand Nollet	PTS	10	25 March 1958	Earls Court Empress Hall, Kensington, United Kingdom	
Win	36–1	(Cuba) Orlando Zulueta	PTS	10	1 January 1958	Earls Court Empress Hall, Kensington, United Kingdom	
Win	35–1	(Mexico) Al Nevarez	PTS	10	30 November 1957	Rand Stadium, Johannesburg, Gauteng, South Africa	
Win	34–1	(Spain) Jose Hernandez	TKO	10	5 November 1957	Royal Albert Hall, Kensington, United Kingdom	
Win	33–1	(United States) Jimmy Carter	PTS	10	8 October 1957	Royal Albert Hall, Kensington, United Kingdom	
Win	32–1	(Spain) Boby Ros	PTS	10	6 September 1957	King's Hall, Belle Vue, Manchester, United Kingdom	
Win	31–1	(United Kingdom) Billy Spider Kelly	PTS	10	15 August 1957	Kelvin Hall, Glasgow, United Kingdom	
Win	30–1	(United Kingdom) Dave Charnley	PTS	15	11 May 1957	Earls Court Empress Hall, Kensington, United Kingdom	
Win	29–1	(Italy) Franco Rosini	PTS	10	11 May 1957	Roan Mine Club, Luanshya, Zambia	
Win	28–1	(South Africa) Johnny van Rensburg	RTD	15	14 February 1957	Green Point Track, Cape Town, South Africa	
Win	27–1	(Canada) Richie Howard	PTS	10	1 December 1956	Olympia Ice Rink, Johannesburg, Gauteng, South Africa	
Win	26–1	(Canada) Richie Howard	PTS	15	10 November 1956	Rand Stadium, Johannesburg, Gauteng, South Africa	
Win	25–1	(Belgium) Georges DeVos	PTS	10	6 October 1956	Olympia Ice Rink, Johannesburg, Gauteng, South Africa	
Draw	24–1	(South Africa) Johnny van Rensburg	PTS	15	11 August 1956	Olympia Ice Rink, Johannesburg, Gauteng, South Africa	
Win	24–1	(South Africa) Johnny van Rensburg	PTS	15	16 June 1956	Olympia Ice Rink, Johannesburg, Gauteng, South Africa	
Win	23–1	(South Africa) Tienie Pretorius	TKO	10	19 March 1956	Roan Mine Club, Luanshya, Zambia	
Win	22–1	(South Africa) Hubert Essakow	KO	12	19 March 1956	City Hall, Johannesburg, Gauteng, South Africa	
Lost	21–1	(South Africa) Johnny van Rensburg	RTD	15	10 December 1955	Olympia Ice Rink, Johannesburg, Gauteng, South Africa	
Win	21–0	(West Germany) Albert Mueller	KO	10	19 November 1955	Davies Stadium, Port Elizabeth, South Africa	
Draw	20–0	(France) Robert Cohen	PTS	15	3 September 1955	Rand Stadium, Johannesburg, Gauteng, South Africa	
Win	20–0	(Italy) Tino Cardinale	TKO	10	23 May 1955	City Hall, Durban, Natal, South Africa	
Win	19–0	(South Africa) Henry Bruyns	KO	12	23 April 1955	Kroonstad, Free State, South Africa	
Win	18–0	(South Africa) Willie van der Merwe	KO	8	9 April 1955	City Hall, Johannesburg, Gauteng, South Africa	
Win	17–0	(France) Jean Bichot	PTS	10	14 March 1955	Wembley Stadium, Johannesburg, Gauteng, South Africa	
Win	16–0	(South Africa) Louis Klopper	RTD	12	7 February 1955	City Hall, Johannesburg, Gauteng, South Africa	
Win	15–0	(South Africa) Jerry Jooste	TKO	8	13 December 1954	Raylton Sports Club, Salisbury, Rhodesia	
Win	14–0	(France) Andre Valignat	PTS	10	6 November 1954	Rand Stadium, Johannesburg, Gauteng, South Africa	
Win	13–0	(United States) Pappy Gault	PTS	10	2 October 1954	Rand Stadium, Johannesburg, Gauteng, South Africa	
Win	12–0	(South Africa) Gerry Britz	TKO	10	2 September 1954	City Hall, Johannesburg, Gauteng, South Africa	
Win	11–0	(United Kingdom) Denny Dawson	KO	10	30 June 1954	Olympia Ice Rink, Johannesburg, Gauteng, South Africa	
Win	10–0	(South Africa) Tony Lombard	PTS	12	22 May 1954	City Hall, Johannesburg, Gauteng, South Africa	
Win	9–0	(South Africa) Gary Gordon	TKO	8	8 May 1954	Rand Stadium, Johannesburg, Gauteng, South Africa	
Win	8–0	(South Africa) Jackie O'Connor	KO	12	9 March 1954	City Hall, Johannesburg, Gauteng, South Africa	
Win	7–0	(South Africa) Matthew Raaff	TKO	12	26 October 1953	Feather Market Hall, Port Elizabeth, Eastern Cape, South Africa	
Win	6–0	(South Africa) Jerry Jooste	RTD	8	3 October 1953	Rand Stadium, Johannesburg, Gauteng, South Africa	
Win	5–0	(South Africa) Kalla Persson	KO	6	29 August 1953	Wembley Stadium, Johannesburg, Gauteng, South Africa	
Win	4–0	(South Africa) Bokkie Grobbler	KO	6	5 August 1953	Wembley Stadium, Johannesburg, Gauteng, South Africa	
Win	3–0	(South Africa) Billy Lamberton	PTS	6	24 July 1953	Olympia Ice Rink, Johannesburg, Gauteng, South Africa	
Win	2–0	(South Africa) Tiny Corbett	KO	8	13 June 1953	City Hall, Johannesburg, Gauteng, South Africa	
Win	1–0	(South Africa) Jackie O'Connor	PTS	4	5 September 1953	Wembley Stadium, Johannesburg, Gauteng, South Africa	

== Training career ==
Toweel trained Charlie Weir, and world champions Brian Mitchell and Thulani Malinga.

== Olympic results ==
- Defeated Kornél Molnár (Hungary) 3-0
- Defeated Al Asuncion (Philippines) 2-1
- Defeated Han Soo-An (South Korea) 3-0
- Lost to Nate Brooks (United States) 0-3

== Later life and death ==
Willie lived in Randburg, South Africa, until his death on Christmas Day, 25 December 2017.
