= Lew Evans (rugby league) =

Welsh rugby league footballer

Personal information
- Full name: David Lewis Evans
- Born: 3 September 1919; Briton Ferry, Neath Port Talbot, Wales
- Died: 27 September 2017 (aged 98); Temora, New South Wales, Australia

Playing information
- Position: Lock
Club
Years	Team	Pld	T	G	FG	P
1946–48	St. George	20	7	0	0	21

David Lewis Evans (3 September 1919 – 27 September 2017) was an Australian rugby league footballer who played in the 1940s.

Lew Evans came to Sydney from Newcastle, New South Wales with Ray Ainsworth in 1946, just after he was discharged from war service in the RAAF.

During his three years at St. George, Evans played a total of 70 grade games, 20 of them in first grade. After three years at Saints, he moved to Temora as captain/coach in 1949 and remained there for most of his life.

Evans died on 27 September 2017, aged 98.
