= Leszek Kudłacik =

Polish boxer (1929–1993)

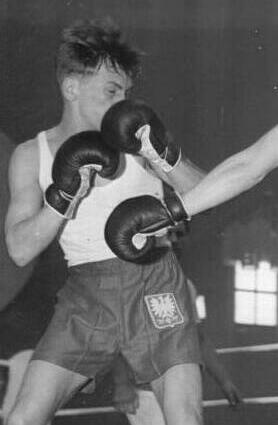
- Kudłacik in 1952

Personal information
- Nationality: Polish
- Born: 11 October 1929; Nowy Dwór Mazowiecki, Poland
- Died: 30 July 1993 (aged 63); Kraków, Poland

Sport
- Sport: Boxing

Leszek Kudłacik (11 October 1929 – 30 July 1993) was a Polish boxer. He competed in the men's light welterweight event at the 1952 Summer Olympics.
