= Kornél Molnár =

Hungarian boxer (born 1933)

Personal information
- Nationality: Hungarian
- Born: 14 September 1930
- Died: 28 August 2018 (aged 87)

Sport
- Sport: Boxing

Kornél Molnár (14 September 1930 – 28 August 2018) was a Hungarian boxer. He competed in the men's flyweight event at the 1952 Summer Olympics.
