= Leif Hansen (Norwegian boxer) =

Norwegian boxer

Leif Håkon "Baggis" Hansen (8 February 1928 – 6 November 2004) was a Norwegian boxer who competed in the 1952 Summer Olympics.

He was born and died in Oslo, and represented the sports club SK av 1909. He finished seventeenth in the light-welterweight division in the boxing at the 1960 Summer Olympics. He took five Norwegian national titles (in both lightweight, light-welterweight and welterweight) between 1951 and 1955.

Hansen later had a career in professional boxing between 1956 and 1964. He entered ten matches, and won five.

== 1952 Olympic results ==
Below is the record of Leif Hansen, a Norwegian light welterweight boxer who competed at the 1952 Helsinki Olympics:

- Round of 32: lost to Charles Adkins (United States) referee stopped contest in first round
