= Pablo Lugo =

Puerto Rican boxer (1932–2024)

Personal information
- Born: September 28, 1932 San Juan, Puerto Rico
- Died: January 22, 2024 (aged 91)
Medal record
Men's Boxing
Representing Puerto Rico
Central American and Caribbean Games
Gold medal – first place	1959 Caracas	Flyweight

Pablo Raul Lugo Cruz (September 28, 1932 – January 22, 2024) was a Puerto Rican boxer, who competed for his native country at the 1952 Summer Olympics in Helsinki, Finland.

There he was defeated in the first round of the Men's Flyweight (– 51 kg) division by Austria's Alfred Zima. Cruz won the gold medal in the same weight division at the 1959 Central American and Caribbean Games in Caracas, Venezuela.

Lugo died on January 22, 2024, at the age of 91. He was buried at the Morovis National Cemetery.

== 1952 Olympic Results ==
Below are the results of Pablo Lugo, a Puerto Rican flyweight boxer who competed at the 1952 Olympics in Helsinki:

- Round of 32: lost to Alfred Zima (Austria) by decision, 1-2

== Sources ==
- sports-reference
