= Tom Burns (footballer) =

Australian rules footballer

Personal information
- Full name: Thomas Francis John Burns
- Born: 13 October 1916; Goroke, Victoria
- Died: 16 July 1993 (aged 76)
- Original team: Goroke
- Height: 180 cm (5 ft 11 in)
- Weight: 83 kg (183 lb)

Playing career^{1}
Years	Club	Games (Goals)
1944	Geelong	6 (5)
- ^{1} Playing statistics correct to the end of 1944.

Tom Burns (13 October 1916 – 16 July 1993) was an Australian rules footballer who played with Geelong in the Victorian Football League (VFL).

He served in the Australian Air Force during World War Two.
