= Miroslav Proft =

Czech sport shooter

Personal information
- Born: 9 December 1923
- Died: 23 October 2011 (aged 87)

Sport
- Sport: Sport shooting

Miroslav Proft (9 December 1923 – 23 October 2011) was a Czech sport shooter. He competed in the 50 m pistol event at the 1952 Summer Olympics.
