= Michelangelo Borriello =

Italian sports shooter (1909–1995)

Personal information
- Born: 23 April 1909 Rome, Italy
- Died: 6 September 1995 (aged 86) Rome, Italy

Sport
- Sport: Sports shooting

Michelangelo Borriello (23 April 1909 – 6 September 1995) was an Italian sports shooter. He competed at the 1936, 1948, 1952 and 1956 Summer Olympics.

Sporting positions
Preceded by Giovanni Gatta	President of the Unione Italiana Tiro a Segno; 1975–1989	Succeeded by Antonio Orati
