= Federico López (Cuban basketball player) =

Cuban basketball player

Personal information
- Born: 5 May 1918 Havana, Cuba
- Died: 19 February 2001 (aged 82) San Juan, Puerto Rico

Sport
- Sport: Basketball

Federico López Carviso (5 May 1918 – 19 February 2001) was a Cuban basketball player. He competed in the men's tournament at the 1948 Summer Olympics and the 1952 Summer Olympics.
