= Sarkis Moussa =

Lebanese boxer

Personal information
- Full name: Sarkis Ayoub Moussa
- Nationality: Lebanese
- Born: 14 February 1929

Sport
- Sport: Boxing

Sarkis Ayoub Moussa (Arabic: سركيس ايوب موسى; born 14 February 1929) is a Lebanese boxer. He competed in the men's light welterweight event at the 1952 Summer Olympics.

Prior to his appearance at the Olympics, he represented Lebanon at the 1951 Mediterranean Games, where he won a bronze medal in the 63.5 kilogram division. He also boxed at the first two editions of the Arab Games, winning a bronze in the 71 kilogram division in 1953 and a silver in the 75 kilogram division in 1957 Arab Games.
