= Valter Sentimenti =

Italian boxer (1923–1987)

Personal information
- Nationality: Italian
- Born: 19 March 1923
- Died: 1 April 1987 (aged 64)

Sport
- Sport: Boxing

Valter Sentimenti (19 March 1923 – 1 April 1987) was an Italian boxer. He competed in the men's middleweight event at the 1952 Summer Olympics.
