= Roland Johansson (boxer) =

Swedish boxer

Personal information
- Nationality: Swedish
- Born: 19 July 1930; Halmstad, Sweden
- Died: 24 April 2005 (aged 74); Halmstad, Sweden

Sport
- Sport: Boxing

Roland Johansson (19 July 1930 – 24 April 2005) was a Swedish boxer. He competed in the men's flyweight event at the 1952 Summer Olympics.
