= George Barker (footballer, born 1916) =

Australian rules footballer

Personal information
- Full name: George Joseph Barker
- Born: 26 June 1916; Woodend, Victoria
- Died: 5 July 1993 (aged 77)
- Height: 178 cm (5 ft 10 in)
- Weight: 89 kg (196 lb)

Playing career^{1}
Years	Club	Games (Goals)
1939	Hawthorn	1 (0)
- ^{1} Playing statistics correct to the end of 1939.

George Joseph Barker (26 June 1916 – 5 July 1993) was an Australian rules footballer who played with Hawthorn in the Victorian Football League (VFL).

He was the brother of Jack Barker who also played with Hawthorn in this period.
