= Ebrahim Afsharpour =

Iranian boxer

Personal information
- Nationality: Iranian
- Born: 8 October 1930

Sport
- Sport: Boxing

Ebrahim Afsharpour (Persian: ابراهیم افشارپور; born 8 October 1930) is an Iranian boxer. He competed in the 1952 Summer Olympics.
