= Giichi Arima =

Giichi Arima (有馬 義一)
- Manager
- Born: September 1911; Naha, Okinawa, Japan
- Died: July 3, 1993 (aged 81)

JPCL debut
- 1951, for the Taiyo Whales

JPCL statistics
- Games: 61
- Win–loss record: 21-38
- Winning %: .356

Teams
- As manager: Taiyo Whales (1951)

Giichi Arima (有馬 義一)(September, 1911 - July 3, 1993) was a baseball player in Japan. He played for the Taiyo Whales (now the Yokohama DeNA BayStars) in the Japan Central League, and also managed them for part of 1951.
