= Leslie Handunge =

Sri Lankan boxer (1921–1980s)

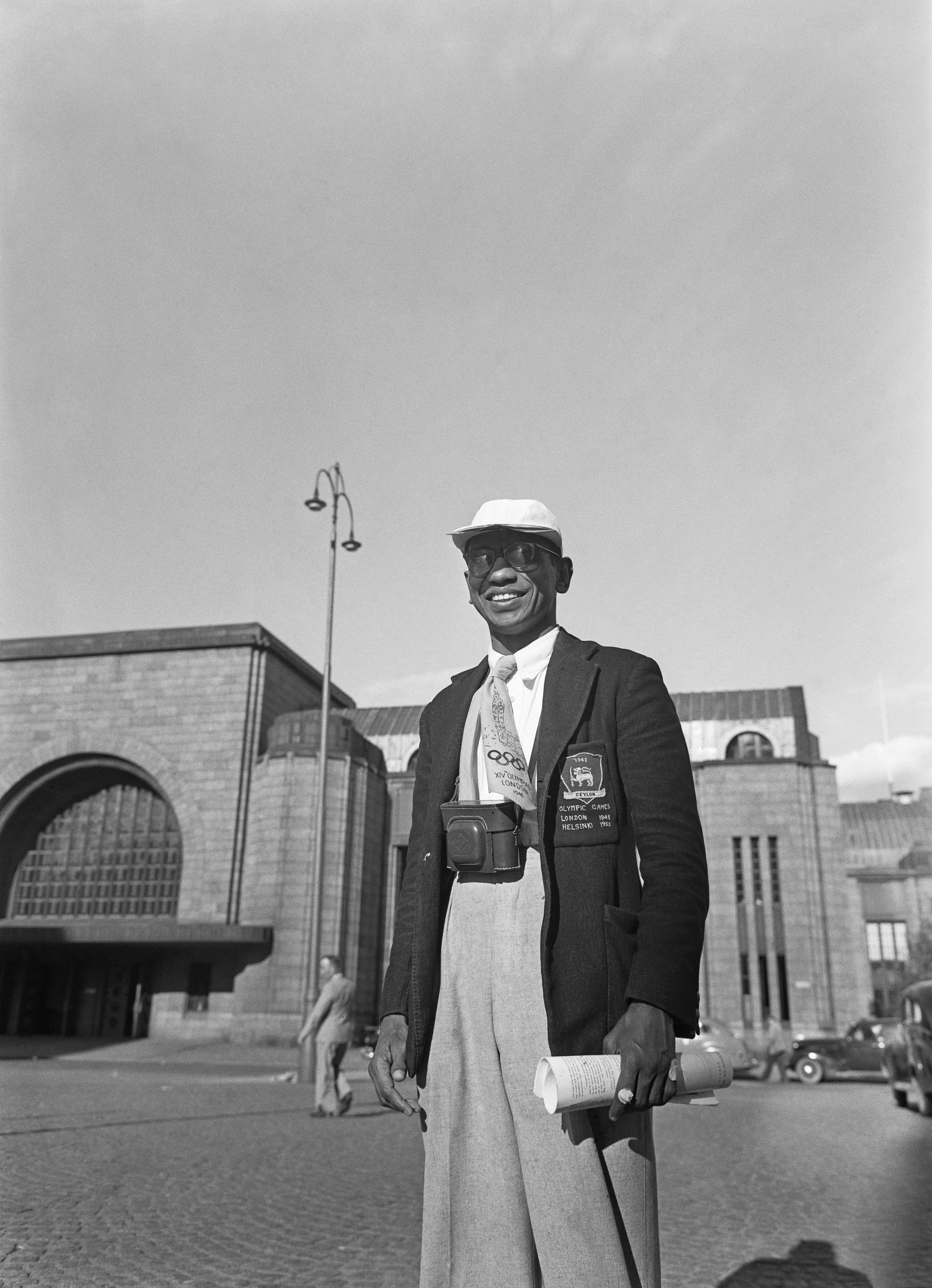
- Leslie Handunge during 1952 Summer Olympics

Personal information
- Full name: Leslie Donovan Perera Handunge
- Nationality: Sri Lankan
- Born: 18 June 1921
- Died: late 1980s

Sport
- Sport: Boxing

Leslie Donovan Perera Handunge (18 June 1921 – late 1980s) was a Sri Lankan boxer. He competed at the 1948 Summer Olympics and the 1952 Summer Olympics.
