= Andrew Reddy =

Irish boxer (1933–2022)

Personal information
- Nationality: Irish
- Born: 18 January 1933; Dublin, Ireland
- Died: 6 March 2022 (aged 89); Walkinstown, Dublin, Ireland

Sport
- Sport: Boxing

Andrew Reddy (18 January 1933 – 6 March 2022) was an Irish boxer. He competed at the 1952 Summer Olympics and the 1960 Summer Olympics. Reddy died in Walkinstown, Dublin on 6 March 2022, at the age of 89.
