= Ernesto Rivera (sport shooter) =

Puerto Rican sports shooter

Personal information
- Born: 24 May 1914 Caguas, Puerto Rico
- Died: 23 November 1991 (aged 77) Vega Baja, Puerto Rico

Sport
- Sport: Sports shooting

Ernesto Rivera (24 May 1914 – 23 November 1991) was a Puerto Rican sports shooter. He competed in the 25 m pistol event at the 1952 Summer Olympics.
