= Erkki Mallenius =

Finnish boxer (1928–2003)

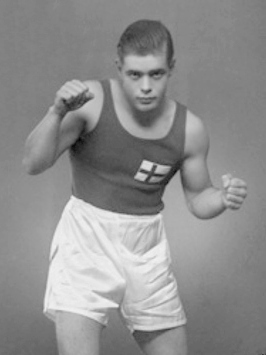

Personal information
- Born: 12 January 1928 Lappeenranta, Finland
- Died: 2 July 2003 (aged 75) Pori, Finland
- Height: 172 cm (5 ft 8 in)
- Weight: 63–70 kg (139–154 lb)

Sport
- Sport: Boxing
Medal record
Representing Finland
Olympic Games
Bronze medal – third place	1952 Helsinki	Light welterweight

Erkki Aarno Mallenius (12 January 1928 – 2 July 2003) was a Finnish amateur boxer who won a bronze medal in the light welterweight division at the 1952 Olympics.

Mallenius took up boxing in 1945 and in 1946 won the Finnish junior lightweight title. He never held a senior national title, and qualified to the Helsinki Olympics by winning the 1952 Olympic trials. At the Olympics he won his first two bouts, but broke a carpal bone in a hand in the second one, and hence withdrew from the semifinal and retired from boxing. He then worked as a boxing coach and a building contractor. In 2008 he was inducted into the Finnish Boxing Hall of Fame.
