= Alexander Webster (boxer) =

South African boxer

Personal information
- Nationality: South African
- Born: 12 December 1933; Johannesburg, South Africa
- Died: 8 November 1994 (aged 60); Johannesburg, South Africa

Sport
- Sport: Boxing

Alexander Grant Webster (12 December 1933 – 8 November 1994) was a South African boxer. He competed at the 1952 Summer Olympics and the 1956 Summer Olympics. At the 1956 Summer Olympics, he lost to John McCormack of Great Britain.
