= Lew Evans (Australian rules footballer) =

Australian rules footballer

Personal information
- Full name: Llewellyn Page Evans
- Born: 14 October 1927
- Died: 4 July 1993 (aged 65)
- Original team: Parkside
- Height: 163 cm (5 ft 4 in)
- Weight: 67 kg (148 lb)

Playing career^{1}
Years	Club	Games (Goals)
1949	Hawthorn	2 (2)
- ^{1} Playing statistics correct to the end of 1949.

Llewellyn Page Evans (14 October 1927 – 4 July 1993) was an Australian rules footballer who played with Hawthorn in the Victorian Football League (VFL).
