= Al Asuncion =

Filipino boxer (1929–2006)

Personal information
- Full name: Alfredo Gregorio Asuncion
- Born: October 2, 1929
- Died: May 2, 2006 (aged 76) Quezon City, Philippines
- Spouse: Evangeline Custodio

Alfredo Gregorio "Al" Asuncion (October 2, 1929 – May 2, 2006) was a Filipino boxer. He represented his country during the 1952 Olympic Games in Helsinki. He participated in the Olympics as a flyweight. In the first round he won by knockout over Burmese boxer Basil Thompson, but lost in the second round to Willie Toweel of the South Africa.

He died in May 2, 2006 in his residence in Quezon City.

== 1952 Olympic results ==
Below is the record of Al Asuncion, a flyweight boxer from the Philippines who competed at the 1952 Helsinki Olympics:

- Round of 32: defeated Basil Thompson (Burma) by a second-round TKO
- Round of 16: lot to Willie Toweel (South Africa) by decision, 1–2

== Personal life ==
Asuncion was married to Evangeline Custodio with whom he had a son and three daughters.
