= Ferencz Ambruș =

Romanian boxer

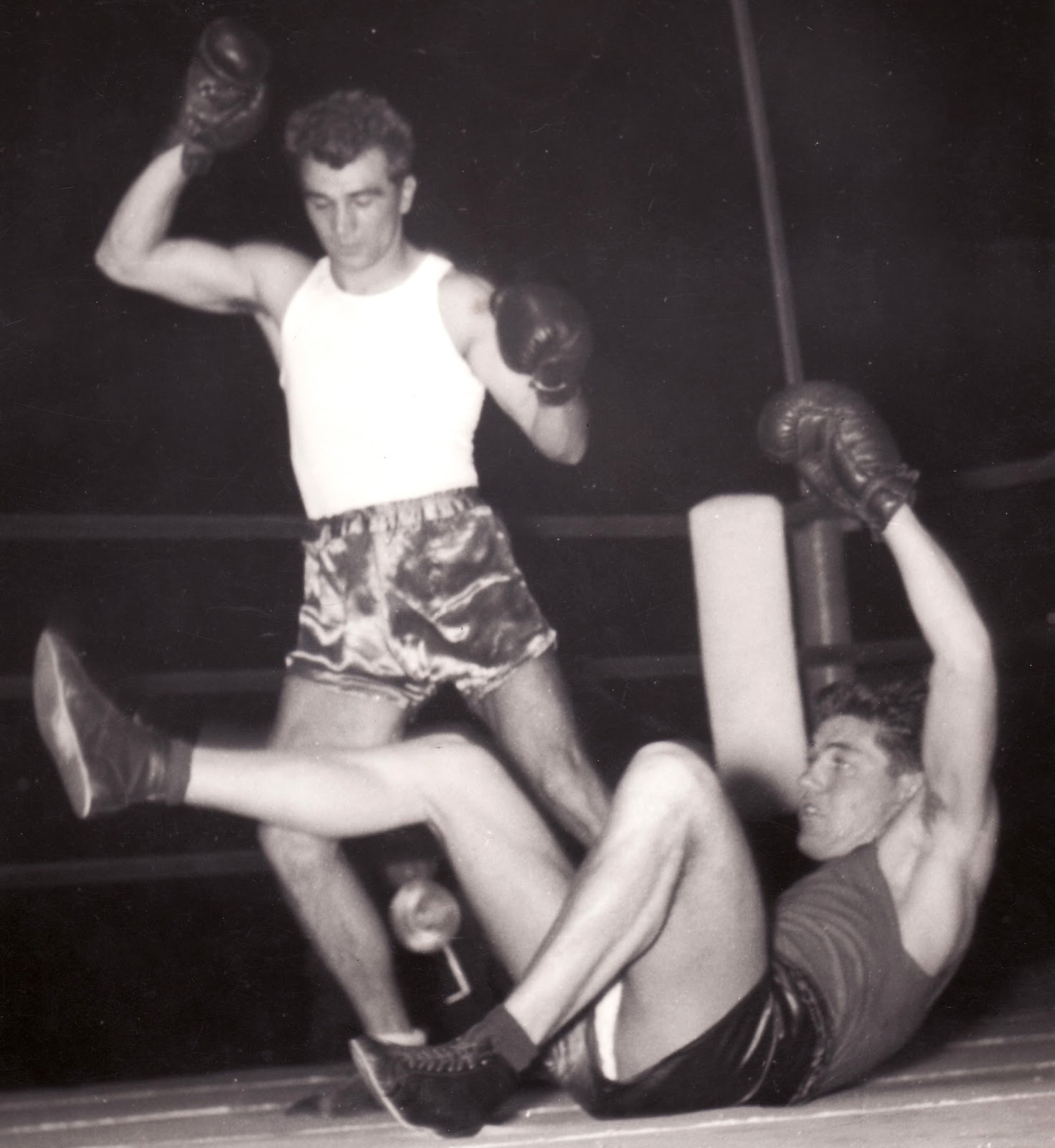
- Ambruș (right) in 1955

Personal information
- Born: 2 March 1930 Cluj, Romania

Sport
- Sport: Boxing
Medal record
Men's amateur boxing
Representing Romania
Romania National Amateur Boxing Championships
Gold medal – first place	1948 Bucharest	-62 kg
Gold medal – first place	1949 Bucharest	-62 kg
Silver medal – second place	1952 Bucharest	-63.5 kg
Silver medal – second place	1956 Bucharest	-63.5 kg
European Amateur Championships
Bronze medal – third place	1953 Warsaw	-63.5 kg

Ferencz Ambruș (born 2 March 1930, date of death unknown) was a Romanian light-welterweight boxer. He competed at the 1952 Summer Olympics, but was eliminated in the second bout. He won two Romanian National Amateur Boxing Championship at the light-welterweight division in 1948 and 1949.
