= Alfred Zima =

Austrian boxer

Personal information
- Nationality: Austrian
- Born: 23 August 1931

Sport
- Sport: Boxing

Alfred Zima (born 23 August 1931) was an Austrian boxer. He competed in the men's flyweight event at the 1952 Summer Olympics.
