= Félix Cortes =

Filipino sports shooter

Personal information
- Born: 11 June 1905
- Died: 13 September 1965 (aged 60)

Sport
- Sport: Sports shooting

Félix Cortes (11 June 1905 – 13 September 1965) was a Filipino sport shooter. He competed in two events at the 1952 Summer Olympics.
