= Mario de Armas =

Cuban sports shooter

Personal information
- Born: 20 December 1915 Havana, Cuba
- Died: 19 December 1986 (aged 70) Dade County, Florida, United States

Sport
- Sport: Sports shooting

Mario de Armas (20 December 1915 – 19 December 1986) was a Cuban sports shooter. He competed in two events at the 1952 Summer Olympics.
