= Bruno Visintin =

Italian boxer (1932–2015)

Medal record

Men's Boxing

Representing Italy

Olympic Games
Bronze medal – third place	1952 Helsinki	Light Welterweight

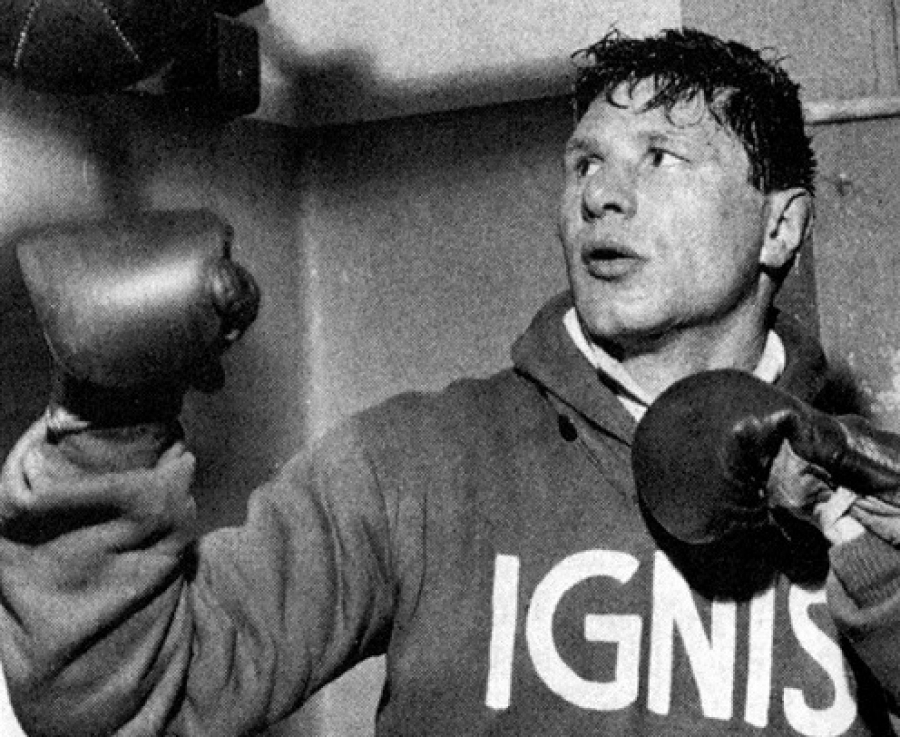
Bruno Visintin

Bruno Visintin (23 November 1932 – 11 January 2015) was a boxer from Italy. He was born in La Spezia, Italy. Visintin was a Light Welterweight (140 lb/63.5 kg) Olympic Bronze Medalist at the 1952 Helsinki Olympics. In 1951, he won the European Amateur Boxing Championships in Milan. He died at the age of 82 in January 2015 at a hospital in La Spezia.

== 1952 Olympic results ==
Below is the record of Bruno Visintin, an Italian light welterweight boxer who competed at the 1952 Helsinki Olympics:

- Round of 32: defeated Ernesto Porto (Philippines) by a second-round knockout
- Round of 16: defeated Juan Curet Alvarez (Puerto Rico) by decision, 3–0
- Quarterfinal: defeated Terence Milligan (Ireland) by decision, 3–0
- Semifinal: lost to Charles Adkins (United States) by decision, 0-3 (was awarded bronze medal)
