= Anatoli Bulakov =

Soviet boxer (born 1994)

Medal record

Men's boxing

Representing the Soviet Union

Olympic Games
Bronze medal – third place	1952 Helsinki	Flyweight

European Amateur Championships
Bronze medal – third place	1953 Warsaw	Flyweight

Anatoly Nikolayevich Bulakov (Russian: Анатолий Николаевич Булаков) (February 3, 1930 – September 19, 1994) was a boxer from the USSR, who won the bronze medal in the flyweight division (– 51 kg) at the 1952 Summer Olympics in Helsinki.

He trained at Dynamo in Moscow. Bulakov competed in flyweight. He was the USSR Champion from 1949 to 1954, bronze medal winner at the 1953 European Championship and 1959 Summer Universiade Champion. During his career he won 126 fights out of 130.

== 1952 Olympic results ==
- Round of 32: defeated Hein van der Zee (Netherlands) on points, 3-0
- Round of 16: defeated Aristide Pozzali (Italy) on points, 3-0
- Quarterfinal: defeated Dai Dower (Great Britain) on points, 2-1
- Semifinal: lost to Edgar Basel (Germany) on points, 1-2 (was awarded a bronze medal)
