= Bulgaria at the 1952 Summer Olympics =

- IOC code: BUL
- NOC: Bulgarian Olympic Committee

in Helsinki, Finland 19 July–3 August 1952
- Competitors: 63 in 8 sports
- Flag bearer: Boris Nikolov
- Medals Ranked 40th: Gold 0 Silver 0 Bronze 1 Total 1

Summer Olympics appearances (overview)
- 1896; 1900–1920; 1924; 1928; 1932; 1936; 1948; 1952; 1956; 1960; 1964; 1968; 1972; 1976; 1980; 1984; 1988; 1992; 1996; 2000; 2004; 2008; 2012; 2016; 2020; 2024; 2028

Bulgaria competed at the 1952 Summer Olympics in Helsinki, Finland. The nation returned to the Olympic Games after having missed the 1948 Summer Olympics. 63 competitors, 54 men and 9 women, took part in 34 events in 8 sports.

== Medalists ==
Medal	Name	Sport	Event	Date
Bronze	Boris Nikolov	Boxing	Men's Middleweight	1 August

== Athletics ==
Track & Road Events

The fastest two from each heat qualifies for the quarterfinals.

Fencer	Event	Heats		Quarterfinals		Semifinals		Final	
Fencer	Event	Result	Rank	Result	Rank	Result	Rank	Result	Rank
Angel Gavrilov	100m	11.29	4	Did not advance					
Angel Kolev	100m	11.01	2 Q	DSQ		Did not advance			
Angel Kolev	200m	22.24	2 Q	22.07	3	Did not advance			
Tsvetana Berkovska	Women's 100m	12.20	2 Q	12.30	6	Did not advance			
Tsvetana Berkovska	Women's 200m	25.20	3	Did not advance					

Field Events

Men

Athlete	Event	Qualification		Final	
Athlete	Event	Distance	Position	Distance	Position
Nikola Dagorov	Triple jump	13.82	30	Did not advance	

== Basketball ==
=== Preliminary round ===
==== Group 2 ====
Team	Pld	W	L	PF	PA	PD	Pts
Soviet Union	3	3	0	192	143	+49	6
Bulgaria	3	2	1	163	182	−19	5
Mexico	3	1	2	172	171	+1	4
Finland	3	0	3	147	178	−31	3

Bulgaria	46–74	Soviet Union

Mexico	44–52	Bulgaria

Finland	64–65	Bulgaria

=== Quarterfinals ===
The top two teams in each quarterfinals advanced to the semifinals. The other two teams in each quarterfinals played in the fifth through eighth place classification.

==== Quarterfinals group A ====
Team	Pld	W	L	PF	PA	PD	Pts
Uruguay	3	2	1	194	187	+7	5
Argentina	3	2	1	226	174	+52	5
Bulgaria	3	1	2	177	220	−43	4
France	3	1	2	178	194	−16	4

Bulgaria	56–100	Argentina

Bulgaria	54–62	Uruguay

France	58–67	Bulgaria

=== Classification matches ===
==== 5-8th-place match ====
Bulgaria	53–60	Chile

==== 7th-place match ====
France	44–58	Bulgaria

== Boxing ==
Bulgaria entered four boxers to compete in each of the following weight classes into the Olympic boxing tournament.

Boris Nikolov won the first medal for Bulgaria in their Summer Olympics history with his bronze medal in Men's middleweight category, where he reached the semifinal, but lost from Vasile Tiță from Romania.The rules in the boxing are allowing both of the semifinal losers to win bronze medal without a match between them.

Athlete	Event	First Round	Second round	Third round(Quarterfinal)	Semifinal	Final	
Athlete	Event	Opposition Result	Opposition Result	Opposition Result	Opposition Result	Opposition Result	Rank
Georgi Malezanov	Men's featherweight	Erdei (HUN); L 1–2	Did not advance				
Lyubomir Markov	Men's lightweight	Wohlers (GER); L 3–0	Did not advance				
Petar Spasov	Men's light middleweight	Foster (GBR); W 2–1	Kontula (FIN); W 3–0	Papp (HUN); L 0–3	Did not advance		
Boris Nikolov	Men's middleweight	Stürmer (LUX); W 3-0	Gooding (GBR); W 2–1	Wemhömer (GER); W 3–0	Tiță (ROU); L 0–3	Did not advance	3rd place, bronze medalist(s)

== Cycling ==
Road Competition

Men's Individual Road Race (190.4 km)

- Petar Georgiev — 5:24:34.0 (→ 46th place)
- Boyan Kotsev — did not finish (→ no ranking)
- Ilya Velchev — did not finish (→ no ranking)
- Milcho Rosev — did not finish (→ no ranking)

== Football ==
Preliminary round results

15 July 1952
19:00

Soviet Union	2–1 (a.e.t.)	Bulgaria
Bobrov 100'; Trofimov 104'	Report	Kolev 95'

Kotkan Urheilukeskus, Kotka
Attendance: 10,637
Referee: Istvan Zsolt (HUN)

=== Bulgaria ===
Head coach: Krum Milev

Pos.	Player	DoB	Age	Caps	Club	Tournament games	Tournament goals	Minutes played	Sub off	Sub on	Cards yellow/red
DF	Boris Apostolov	20 January 1925	27	?	(People's Republic of Bulgaria) Spartak Sofia
FW	Petar Argirov	19 February 1923	29	?	(People's Republic of Bulgaria) Lokomotiv Sofia
MF	Stefan Bozhkov	20 September 1923	28	?	(People's Republic of Bulgaria) CSKA Sofia
MF	Georgi Eftimov	24 March 1931	21	?
FW	Ivan Kolev	1 November 1930	21	?	(People's Republic of Bulgaria) CSKA Sofia
DF	Manol Manolov	22 October 1926	25	?	(People's Republic of Bulgaria) CSKA Sofia
FW	Dimitar Milanov	18 October 1928	23	?	(People's Republic of Bulgaria) CSKA Sofia
FW	Panayot Panayotov	30 December 1930	21	?	(People's Republic of Bulgaria) CSKA Sofia
GK	Apostol Sokolov	23 October 1917	34	?	(People's Republic of Bulgaria) Spartak Sofia
FW	Dimitar Stoyanov	18 October 1927	24	?
MF	Gavril Stoyanov	9 July 1929	23	?	(People's Republic of Bulgaria) CSKA Sofia
FW	Krum Yanev	9 January 1929	23	?	(People's Republic of Bulgaria) CSKA Sofia

== Gymnastics ==
It's editing right now

Individual

Men

Athlete	Apparatus																								Total	Rank
Athlete	Floor				Rings				Pommel horse				Vault				Parallel bars				Horizontal bar				Total	Rank
Athlete	Comp.	Vol.	Total	R	Comp.	Vol.	Total	R	Comp.	Vol.	Total	R	Comp.	Vol.	Total	R	Comp.	Vol.	Total	R	Comp.	Vol.	Total	R	Total	Rank
Mincho Todorov	9.30	9.30	18.60	23	9.35	9.10	18.45	40	8.95	8.50	17.45	81	9.15	9.20	18.35	62	9.00	8.95	17.95	72	9.30	9.05	18.35	44	109.15	43
Vasil Konstantinov	8.30	9.05	17.35	88	9.15	9.50	18.65	31	8.50	9.10	17.60	67	9.00	8.85	17.85	103	8.95	8.95	17.90	76	8.55	8.35	16.90	104	106.25	65
Dimitar Yordanov	8.60	8.65	17.25	93	9.20	9.25	18.45	44	7.00	8.55	15.55	116	9.05	9.05	18.10	85	8.90	9.15	18.05	66	9.10	9.15	18.25	49	105.65	68
Nikolay Milev	8.60	8.15	16.75	112	9.10	9.15	18.25	59	9.40	8.80	18.20	37	7.65	9.05	16.70	151	9.15	8.75	17.90	78	9.05	7.00	16.05	130	103.85	77
Todor Todorov	9.30	8.75	18.05	47	8.80	8.65	17.45	96	7.70	8.20	15.90	112	9.05	9.00	18.05	92	9.00	9.20	18.20	55	8.40	7.15	15.55	139	103.20	83
Nikolay Atanasov	7.00	8.25	15.25	155	9.15	8.80	17.95	72	8.95	8.30	17.25	82	9.05	8.85	17.90	100	8.65	8.30	16.95	121	8.20	8.45	16.65	114	101.95	96
Iliya Topalov	9.10	8.70	17.90	55	9.30	9.20	18.50	37	9.15	6.00	15.15	127	6.60	9.05	15.65	166	9.25	6.50	15.75	152	6.50	4.90	11.40	169	94.35	140
Stoyan Stoyanov	8.95	-	8.95	179	9.40	-	9.40	182	9.15	-	9.15	181	9.20	-	9.20	181	9.15	-	9.15	181	9.60	7.65	17.25	91	63.10	182

Individual

Athlete	Apparatus												Total points	Rank
Athlete	Floor		Rings		Pommel horse		Vault		Parallel bars		Horizontal bar		Total points	Rank
Athlete	Points	Ranking place	Points	Ranking	Points	Ranking	Points	Ranking	Points	Ranking	Points	Ranking		
Mincho Todorov	18.60	23	18.45	40	17.45	81	18.35	62	17.95	72	18.35	44	109.15	43
Vasil Konstantinov	17.35	88	18.65	31	17.60	67	17.85	103	17.90	76	16.90	104	106.25	65
Dimitar Yordanov	17.25	93	18.45	44	15.55	116	18.10	85	18.05	66	18.25	49	105.65	68
Nikolay Milev	16.75	114	18.25	59	18.20	37	16.70	151	17.90	78	16.05	130	103.85	77
Todor Todorov	18.05	50	17.45	96	15.90	112	18.05	92	18.20	55	15.55	139	103.20	83
Nikolay Atanasov	15.25	155	17.95	72	17.25	82	17.90	100	16.95	121	16.65	114	101.95	96
Iliya Topalov	17.90	57	18.50	37	15.15	127	15.65	166	15.75	152	11.40	169	94.35	140
Stoyan Stoyanov	8.95	179	9.40	182	9.15	181	9.20	181	9.15	181	17.25	91	63.10	182

Team

Athlete	Apparatus (best 5 scores)																								Total	Rank
Athlete	Floor				Rings				Pommel horse				Vault				Parallel bars				Horizontal bar				Total	Rank
Athlete	Comp.	Vol.	Total	Rank	Comp.	Vol.	Total	Rank	Comp.	Vol.	Total	Rank	Comp.	Vol.	Total	Rank	Comp.	Vol.	Total	Rank	Comp.	Vol.	Total	Rank	Total	Rank
Mincho Todorov; Vasil Konstantinov; Dimitar Yordanov; Nikolay Milev; Todor Todorov; Nikolay Atanasov; Iliya Topalov; Stoyan Stoyanov	45.25	44.55	89.80	9	46.40	46.20	92.60	7	45.60	43.25	88.85	10	45.45	45.40	90.85	15	45.55	45.00	90.55	11	45.60	42.65	88.25	11	540.90	9

== Shooting ==
Six shooters represented Bulgaria in 1952.

Men

Athlete	Event	Final	
Athlete	Event	Score	Rank
Ivan Ivanov	Trap	182	16
Georgi Keranov	25 m rapid fire pistol	561	17
Nikolay Khristozov	50 m pistol	500	41
Stoyan Popov	50 m pistol	517	26
Khristo Shopov	Trap	168	30
Todor Stanchev	25 m rapid fire pistol	552	25
