= Boxing at the 1952 Summer Olympics – Featherweight =

Olympic boxing tournament

Featherweight boxing at the Games of the XV Olympiad
- Venue: Messuhalli
- Dates: 28 July – 2 August 1952
- Competitors: 30 from 30 nations

Medalists
1st place, gold medalist(s)		Ján Zachara	Czechoslovakia
2nd place, silver medalist(s)		Sergio Caprari	Italy
3rd place, bronze medalist(s)		Joseph Ventaja	France
3rd place, bronze medalist(s)		Leonard Leisching	South Africa

The men's featherweight event was part of the boxing programme at the 1952 Summer Olympics. The weight class allowed boxers of up to 57 kilograms to compete. The competition was held from 28 July to 2 August 1952. 30 boxers from 30 nations competed.

== Medalists ==
Gold	Ján Zachara; Czechoslovakia
Silver	Sergio Caprari; Italy
Bronze	Joseph Ventaja; France
Bronze	Leonard Leisching; South Africa

== Results ==
Winner	NOC	Result	Loser	NOC
First Round (July 28)
Sergio Caprari	Italy	BYE
Pentti Niinivuori	Finland	BYE
Lech Drogosz	Poland	3 – 0	Kyar Ba Nyein	Burma
Pedro Galasso	Brazil	3 – 0	Toshihito Ishimaru	Japan
Edson Brown	United States	3 – 0	Benoy Bose	India
Gheorghe Ilie	Romania	3 – 0	Percival Lewis	Great Britain
Joseph Ventaja	France	2 – 1	Yury Sokolov	Soviet Union
Sydney Greve	Pakistan	KO 2R	Angel Leyes	Argentina
Leonard Walters	Canada	3 – 0	Salah El-Din Fatih	Egypt
Willi Roth	Germany	2 – 1	Donald McDonnell	Australia
Leonard Leisching	South Africa	3 – 0	Emmanuel Agassi	Iran
Stevan Redli	Yugoslavia	TKO 2R	Thomas Reddy	Ireland
János Erdei	Hungary	2 – 1	Georgi Malezanov	Bulgaria
Kurt Schirra	Saar	2 – 1	Luis Aranguren	Venezuela
Ján Zachara	Czechoslovakia	3 – 0	Åke Wärnström	Sweden
Su Bung-Nan	South Korea	3 – 0	Alfred Willommet	Switzerland
Second Round (July 29 & 30)
Sergio Caprari	Italy	2 – 1	Pentti Niinivuori	Finland
Lech Drogosz	Poland	3 – 0	Pedro Galasso	Brazil
Edson Brown	United States	3 – 0	Georghe Ilie	Romania
Joseph Ventaja	France	3 – 0	Sydney Greve	Pakistan
Leonard Walters	Canada	2 – 1	Willi Roth	Germany
Leonard Leisching	South Africa	3 – 0	Stevan Redli	Yugoslavia
János Erdei	Hungary	3 – 0	Kurt Schirra	Saar
Ján Zachara	Czechoslovakia	3 – 0	Su Bung-Nan	South Korea
Third Round (July 31)
Leonard Leisching	South Africa	3 – 0	Leonard Walters	Canada
Sergio Caprari	Italy	3 – 0	Lech Drogosz	Poland
Ján Zachara	Czechoslovakia	2 – 1	János Erdei	Hungary
Joseph Ventaja	France	3 – 0	Edson Brown	United States
Semi-final (August 1)
Sergio Caprari	Italy	2 – 1	Joseph Ventaja	France
Ján Zachara	Czechoslovakia	2 – 1	Leonard Leisching	South Africa
Final (August 2)
Ján Zachara	Czechoslovakia	2 – 1	Sergio Caprari	Italy
