= 1951 European Amateur Boxing Championships =

Boxing competitions

- Host city: Milan
- Country: Italy
- Nations: 20
- Athletes: 132
- Dates: 14–19 May

The 1951 European Amateur Boxing Championships were held in Milan, Italy, from 14 to 19 May. The ninth edition of the bi-annual competition was organised by the European governing body for amateur boxing, EABA. There were 132 fighters from 20 countries participating.

== Medal winners ==
Games	Gold	Silver	Bronze
Flyweight (– 51 kilograms)	Aristide Pozzali; Italy	Hein van der Zee; Netherlands	Pentti Hämäläinen; Finland Antoine Martin; France
Bantamweight (– 54 kilograms)	Vincenzo Dall'Osso; Italy	(Republic of Ireland) William Kelly; Ireland	János Erdei; Hungary Hermann Mazurkiewicz; Austria
Featherweight (– 57 kilograms)	Joseph Ventaja; France	(Socialist Federal Republic of Yugoslavia) Kosta Leković; Yugoslavia	István Kisfalvi; Hungary Åke Wärnström; Sweden
Lightweight (– 60 kilograms)	Bruno Visintin; Italy	István Juhász; Hungary	(Republic of Ireland) David O'Connell; Ireland (Socialist Federal Republic of Yugoslavia) Milivoje Bulat; Yugoslavia
Light Welterweight (– 63.5 kilograms)	Herbert Schilling; West Germany	Marcello Padovani; Italy	Peter Müller; Switzerland (Republic of Ireland) Terence Milligan; Ireland
Welterweight (– 67 kilograms)	Zygmunt Chychła; Poland	Hans Kohlegger; Austria	Gert Stråhle; Sweden Jacques Dugenier; France
Light Middleweight (– 71 kilograms)	László Papp; Hungary	Jens Andersen; Denmark	Alfred Paliński; Poland Alfred Lay; England
Middleweight (– 75 kilograms)	Stig Sjölin; Sweden	Günther Sladky; West Germany	Hans Niederhauser; Switzerland Jean Lalounis; France
Light Heavyweight (– 81 kilograms)	Marcel Limage; Belgium	Bjarne Lingås; Norway	Gianbattista Alfonsetti; Italy Rolf Storm; Sweden
Heavyweight (+ 81 kilograms)	Giacomo di Segni; Italy	Edgar Gorgas; West Germany	Jan Dijkman; Netherlands José Peyre; Belgium

== Medal table ==
Rank	Nation	Gold	Silver	Bronze	Total
1	Italy (ITA)	4	1	1	6
2	West Germany (FRG)	1	2	0	3
3	Hungary (HUN)	1	1	2	4
4	France (FRA)	1	0	3	4
4	Sweden (SWE)	1	0	3	4
6	Belgium (BEL)	1	0	1	2
6	Poland (POL)	1	0	1	2
8	Ireland (IRL)	0	1	2	3
9	Austria (AUT)	0	1	1	2
9	Netherlands (NED)	0	1	1	2
9	Yugoslavia (YUG)	0	1	1	2
12	Denmark (DEN)	0	1	0	1
12	Norway (NOR)	0	1	0	1
14	Switzerland (SUI)	0	0	2	2
15	England (ENG)	0	0	1	1
15	Finland (FIN)	0	0	1	1
Totals (16 entries)		10	10	20	40
