= Junín Department, San Luis =

Junín
- Department
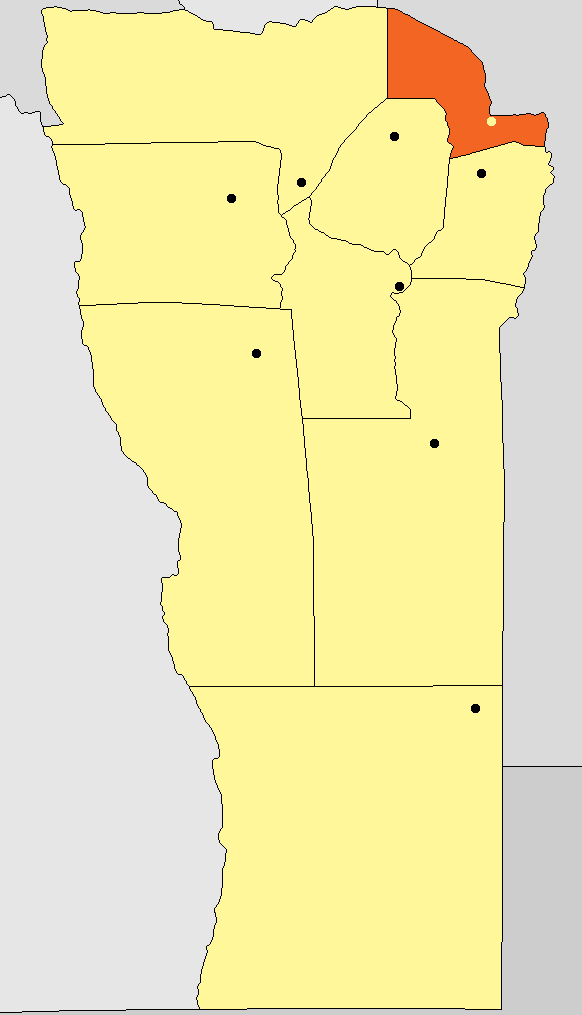
- Location of Junín Department in San Luis Province
- Coordinates: 32°20′S 65°12′W
- Country: Argentina
- Province: San Luis
- Seat: Santa Rosa del Conlara

Area
  - Total: 2,476 km^{2} (956 sq mi)

Population
  - Total: 20,271

Junín is a Department of San Luis Province, Argentina.

With an area of 2,476 km^{2} (956 sq mi) it borders to the west with the Department of Ayacucho, to the south with San Martín and Chacabuco, to the north with the provinces of Córdoba.

== Municipalities ==
- Carpintería
- Cerro de Oro
- Lafinur
- Los Cajones
- Los Molles
- Merlo
- Santa Rosa de Conlara
- Talita

== Villages ==
- Bañado de Cautana
- Balde de Escudero
- Capilla de Romero
- Cerrito Blanco
- Injertos
- La Aguada
- La Invernada
- La Médula
- La Quebrada
- La Unión
- Las Chilcas
- Las Islitas
- Las Lomitas
- Las Palomas
- Los Argüellos
- Los Chañares
- Los Duraznitos
- Los Quebrachos
- Ojo del Río
- Paso Ancho
- Piedra Blanca
- Punta del Agua
- Rincón del Este
- Rosario
