= Boxing at the 1958 Asian Games – Men's 60 kg =

Boxing competitions

Men's 60 kg at the 1958 Asian Games
- Venue: Korakuen Ice Palace
- Date: 28–31 May 1958
- Competitors: 8 from 8 nations

Medalists
| gold medal | Chung Dong-hoon | South Korea |
| silver medal | Shinichiro Suzuki | Japan |
| bronze medal | Celedonio Espinosa | Philippines |
| bronze medal | Sundar Rao | India |

The men's lightweight (60 kilograms) event at the 1958 Asian Games took place from 28 to 31 May 1958 at Korakuen Ice Palace, Tokyo, Japan.

== Schedule ==
All times are Japan Standard Time (UTC+09:00)

| Date | Time | Event |
|---|---|---|
| Wednesday, 28 May 1958 | 14:00 | Quarterfinals |
| Friday, 30 May 1958 | 18:00 | Semifinals |
| Saturday, 31 May 1958 | 18:00 | Final |

== Results ==
Legend

- KO — Won by knockout
- PTS — Won by points
- TKO — Won by technical knockout

Quarterfinals
Chung Dong-hoon (KOR) | PTS
Hassan Pakandam (IRN)
Celedonio Espinosa (PHI) | KO
Chamlong Panichwat (THA)
Sundar Rao (IND) | PTS
Yai Chit (BIR)
Shinichiro Suzuki (JPN) | TKO
Wang Kin-min (ROC)

Semifinals
Chung Dong-hoon (KOR) | PTS
Celedonio Espinosa (PHI)
Sundar Rao (IND)
Shinichiro Suzuki (JPN) | PTS

Final
Chung Dong-hoon (KOR) | PTS
Shinichiro Suzuki (JPN)
