= Boxing at the 1956 Summer Olympics – Featherweight =

Olympic boxing tournament

Featherweight boxing at the Games of the XVI Olympiad
- Venue: West Melbourne Stadium
- Dates: 23 November – 1 December 1956
- Competitors: 18 from 18 nations

Medalists
1st place, gold medalist(s)		Vladimir Safronov	Soviet Union
2nd place, silver medalist(s)		Thomas Nicholls	Great Britain
3rd place, bronze medalist(s)		Henryk Niedźwiedzki	Poland
3rd place, bronze medalist(s)		Pentti Hämäläinen	Finland

The men's featherweight event was part of the boxing programme at the 1956 Summer Olympics. The weight class was allowed boxers of up to 57 kilograms to compete. The competition was held from 23 November to 1 December 1956. 18 boxers from 18 nations competed.

== Medalists ==
Gold	Vladimir Safronov; Soviet Union
Silver	Thomas Nicholls; Great Britain
Bronze	Henryk Niedźwiedzki; Poland
Bronze	Pentti Hämäläinen; Finland

== Results ==
=== First round ===
- Pentti Hämäläinen (FIN) def. Martin Smyth (IRL), PTS
- Bernard Schröter (GDR) def. Paulino Meléndres (PHI), PTS

=== Second round ===
- Henryk Niedźwiedzki (POL) def. Leonard Leisching (RSA), PTS
- Tristán Falfán (ARG) def. Maurice White (PAK), KO-2
- Vladimir Safronov (URS) def. Agostino Cossia (ITA), PTS
- André de Souza (FRA) def. Nontasilp Thayansilp (THA), PTS
- Shinichiro Suzuki (JPN) def. Yaichit Wang (BUR), PTS
- Thomas Nicholls (GBR) def. Noel Hazard (AUS), PTS
- Jan Zachara (TCH) def. Dong-Hun Chung (KOR), PTS
- Pentti Hämäläinen (FIN) def. Bernard Schröter (GDR), PTS

=== Quarterfinals ===
- Henryk Niedźwiedzki (POL) def. Tristan Falfán (ARG), KO-1
- Vladimir Safronov (URS) def. Andre de Souza (FRA), PTS
- Thomas Nicholls (GBR) def. Shinetsu Suzuki (JPN), PTS
- Pentti Hämäläinen (FIN) def. Jan Zachara (TCH), PTS

=== Semifinals ===
- Vladimir Safronov (URS) def. Henryk Niedźwiedzki (POL), PTS
- Thomas Nicholls (GBR) def. Pentti Hämäläinen (FIN), PTS

=== Final ===
- Vladimir Safronov (URS) def. Thomas Nicholls (GBR), PTS
