= Boxing at the 1952 Summer Olympics – Bantamweight =

Bantamweight boxing at the Games of the XV Olympiad
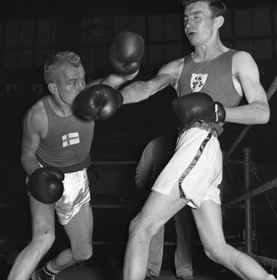
- Pentti Hämäläinen vs John McNally
- Venue: Messuhalli
- Dates: 28 July – 2 August 1952
- Competitors: 23 from 23 nations

Medalists
1st place, gold medalist(s)		Pentti Hämäläinen	Finland
2nd place, silver medalist(s)		John McNally	Ireland
3rd place, bronze medalist(s)		Kang Joon-Ho	South Korea
3rd place, bronze medalist(s)		Gennady Garbuzov	Soviet Union

The men's bantamweight event was part of the boxing programme at the 1952 Summer Olympics. The weight class was the second-lightest contested, and allowed boxers of up to 54 kilograms. The competition was held from 28 July to 2 August 1952. 23 boxers from 23 nations competed.

== Medalists ==
Gold	Pentti Hämäläinen; Finland
Silver	John McNally; Ireland
Bronze	Kang Joon-Ho; South Korea
Bronze	Gennady Garbuzov; Soviet Union

== Results ==
Winner	NOC	Result	Loser	NOC
First Round (July 28 & 29)
Kang Joon-Ho	South Korea	BYE
Fazlollah Nikkhah	Iran	BYE
Davey Moore	United States	BYE
Egon Schidan	Germany	BYE
Vincenzo Dall'Osso	Italy	BYE
Ibrahim Abdrabbou	Egypt	BYE
John McNally	Ireland	BYE
Alejandro Ortuoste	Philippines	BYE
František Majdloch	Czechoslovakia	BYE
Angel Figueroa	Puerto Rico	3 – 0	Tiến Vình	Vietnam
Raul Macías Guevara	Mexico	3 – 0	Angel Amaya	Venezuela
Gennady Garbuzov	Soviet Union	2 – 1	Jean Renard	Belgium
Pentti Hämäläinen	Finland	3 – 0	Thomas Nicholls	Great Britain
Henryk Niedzwiedzki	Poland	TKO 1R	Ronald Charles Gower	Australia
Ion Zlătaru	Romania	DSQ 3R	Antoine Martin	France
Lennie von Graevenitz	South Africa	2 – 1	Rómulo Parés	Argentina
Second Round (July 30)
Kang Joon-Ho	South Korea	3 – 0	Fazlollah Nickhah	Iran
Davey Moore	United States	3 – 0	Egon Schidan	Germany
Vincenzo Dall'osso	Italy	3 – 0	Ibrahim Abdrabbou	Egypt
John McNally	Ireland	3 – 0	Alejandro Ortuoste	Philippines
František Majdloch	Czechoslovakia	3 – 0	Angel Luis Figueroa Otero	Puerto Rico
Gennady Garbuzov	Soviet Union	3 – 0	Raul Macías Guevara	Mexico
Pentti Hamalainen	Finland	3 – 0	Henryk Niedzwiedzki	Poland
Helmuth von Gravenitz	South Africa	2 – 1	Ion Zlataru	Romania
Third Round (July 31)
Gennady Garbuzov	U.S.S.R	3 – 0	František Majdloch	Czechoslovakia
Kang Joon-Ho	South Korea	2 – 1	Davey Moore U.S.A
Pentti Hämäläinen	Finland	3 – 0	Helmuth von Gravenitz	South Africa
John McNally	Ireland	3 – 0	Vincenzo Dall'osso	Italy
Semi-final (August 1)
John McNally	Ireland	3 – 0	Kang Joon-Ho	South Korea
Pentti Hämäläinen	Finland	3 – 0	Gennady Garbuzov	Soviet Union
Final (August 2)
Pentti Hämäläinen	Finland	2 – 1	John McNally	Ireland
