= Vladimir Safronov =

Russian boxer

Medal record

Men's boxing

Representing the Soviet Union

Olympic Games
Gold medal – first place	1956 Melbourne	Featherweight

European Amateur Championships
Bronze medal – third place	1957 Prague	Featherweight

Vladimir Konstantinovich Safronov (Russian: Владимир Константинович Сафронов) (29 December 1934 in Ulan-Ude, Buryat-Mongol ASSR — 26 December 1979) was a Russian featherweight boxer.

Safronov trained at the Armed Forces sports society in Chita, Irkutsk, Moscow. He became the Honoured Master of Sports of the USSR in 1957 and was awarded the Order of the Badge of Honor in the same year. He became the first boxer of the USSR to win a gold medal at the Olympics. He won gold in Boxing at the 1956 Summer Olympics in Melbourne in the featherweight division (– 57 kg). During his career Safronov won 564 fights out of 565.

Safronov graduated from Moscow Poligraphy Institute in 1963 and worked as an art editor at Fizkultura i sport (physical culture and sports) publisher.

== 1956 Olympic results ==
Below is the record of Vladimir Safronov, a featherweight boxer from the Soviet Union who competed at the 1956 Olympic Games in Melbourne:

- Round of 32: bye
- Round of 16: Defeated Agostino Cossia (Italy) points
- Quarterfinal: Defeated Andre de Souza (France) points
- Semifinal: Defeated Henryk Niedzwiedzki (Poland) points
- Final: Defeated Thomas Nicholls (Great Britain) points (Won gold medal)
