= Antoine Martin =

Antoine Martin may refer to:

- Antoine Martin (boxer)
- Antoine Martin (writer)
