= Ion Zlătaru =

Romanian boxer

Personal information
- Nationality: Romanian
- Born: 17 November 1927

Sport
- Sport: Boxing

Ion Zlătaru (born 17 November 1927) was a Romanian boxer. He competed in the men's bantamweight event at the 1952 Summer Olympics. At the 1952 Summer Olympics, he defeated Antoine Martin of France, before losing to Helmuth von Gravenitz of South Africa.
