= Ján Zachara =

Slovak boxer (1928–2025)

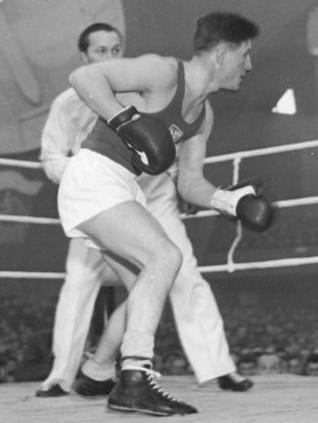
- Zachara in 1952

Personal information
- Born: 27 August 1928 Trenčín, Czechoslovakia
- Died: 2 January 2025 (aged 96) Nová Dubnica, Slovakia

Sport
- Sport: Boxing
Medal record
Men's Boxing
Representing Czechoslovakia
Olympic Games
Gold medal – first place	1952 Helsinki	Featherweight

Ján Zachara (Slovak pronunciation: [ˈjaːn ˈzaxara]; 27 August 1928 – 2 January 2025) was a Slovak boxer. Representing Czechoslovakia, he won the gold medal in the featherweight division at the 1952 Summer Olympics in Helsinki. Zachara also competed in 1956, losing in a quarterfinal to Pentti Hämäläinen of Finland on points.

== Biography ==
Zachara was born on 27 August 1928 in the village of Kubrá, which is now a part of the city of Trenčín, in a family of factory workers. He started boxing at the age of 15 while appenticing as a mechanic. Due to his small body size, he was often ridiculed by other boxers in his youth. In 1946 he became the champion of Slovakia in boxing. Nonetheless, he was not allowed to compete at the 1948 Olympics, because another boxer, who was a Communist party member, was given preference. Nonetheless, Zachara got his revenge at the 1952 Summer Olympics in Helsinki, where he won a gold medal after defeating Sergio Caprari in the finals, despite being considered an underdog. At the subsequent 1956 Summer Olympics in Melbourne, he was eliminated in the quarterfinals by Pentti Hämäläinen. After ending active boxing career, he settled in Dubnica nad Váhom, where he trained young boxers before retiring from the sport.

Zachara died on 2 January 2025, at the age of 96. At the time of death he was the oldest living Olympic champion from Slovakia.

== 1952 Olympic results ==
- Defeated Åke Wärnström (Sweden) 3–0
- Defeated Su Bung-Nan (South Korea) 3–0
- Defeated János Erdei (Hungary) 2–1
- Defeated Leonard Leisching (South Africa) 2–1
- Defeated Sergio Caprari (Italy) 2–1
