= Koutný =

Koutný (feminine Koutná) is a Czech surname. Notable people with the surname include:

- Bedřich Koutný (born 1931), Czech boxer
- Ilona Koutny (born 1953), Hungarian linguist
- Jan Koutný (1897–1976), Czech gymnast
- Lajos Koutny (1939–2022), Hungarian ice hockey player
- Václav Koutný (born 1991), Czech footballer
