= Carpentaria (disambiguation) =

Carpentaria, Carpenteria, or Carpinteria may refer to:

== Plants ==
- Carpentaria (Carpentaria acuminata), a palm native to tropical coastal regions in the north of Northern Territory, Australia
- Carpenteria, also known as the tree-anemone or bush-anemone, a flowering plant endemic to California

== Places ==
- Carpentaria, Queensland, a locality in north-western Queensland
- Gulf of Carpentaria, adjacent to Queensland and the Northern Territory, Australia
- Shire of Carpentaria, a local government area in Queensland, Australia
- Carpinteria, California, USA
  - Carpinteria (Amtrak station), an Amtrak rail station in the city of Carpinteria, California
- Carpintería, San Luis, Argentina

== Other ==
- Carpentaria (novel), a 2006 novel by Alexis Wright
- HMAS Carpentaria, a Royal Australian Navy base at Thursday Island, Torres Strait Islands
- Carpentaria, an unmanned Australian lightvessel (a floating lighthouse) built during 1916-17 and in service to 1985
- Carpenteria (foraminifera), a genus of Foraminifera in the family Victoriellidae, in the superfamily Planorbulinoidea
