= Robert Malouf =

Canadian boxer (1931–2019)

Personal information
- Born: 27 July 1931; Montreal, Quebec, Canada
- Died: 16 November 2019 (aged 88)

Sport
- Sport: Boxing

Robert Malouf (27 July 1931 – 16 November 2019) was a Canadian boxer. He competed in the men's middleweight event at the 1952 Summer Olympics. He lost to Leen Jansen of the Netherlands in the round of 16.
