= Jean Renard =

Belgian boxer (born 1932)

Personal information
- Nationality: Belgian
- Born: 12 July 1932 (age 93) Liège, Belgium

Sport
- Sport: Boxing

Jean Renard (born 12 July 1932) is a Belgian boxer. He competed in the men's bantamweight event at the 1952 Summer Olympics. At the 1952 Summer Olympics, he lost to Gennady Garbuzov of the Soviet Union.
