= Sergio Caprari =

Italian boxer (1932–2015)

Olympic medal record

Men's Boxing

Representing Italy
Silver medal – second place	1952 Helsinki	Featherweight

Sergio Caprari (11 July 1932 – 12 October 2015) was an Italian boxer who won the silver medal in the featherweight division at the 1952 Summer Olympics in Helsinki. Caprari was born in Civitacastellana in 1932. He died in 2015.

== Olympic results ==
- Round of 32: bye
- Round of 16: Defeated Pentti Niinivuori (Finland) by decision, 2–1
- Quarterfinal: Defeated Leszek Drogosz (Poland) by decision, 3–0
- Semifinal: Defeated Joseph Ventaja (France) by decision, 2–1
- Final: Lost to Ján Zachara (Czechoslovakia) by decision, 1–2 (was awarded silver medal)
