= Sydney Greve =

Anglo-Indian Olympic boxer (1925–2015)

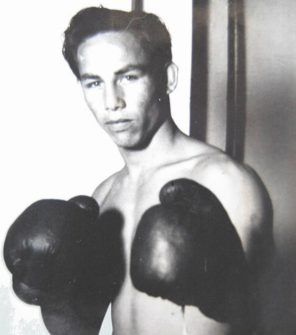
- Greve posing in fighting position

Personal information
- Full name: Sydney Phillip Greve
- Nationality: Anglo-Indian
- Born: 9 September 1925 Indore, Madhya Pradesh, British India
- Died: 7 December 2015 (aged 90) Calgary, Canada

Sport
- Sport: Boxing

Sydney Phillip Greve (9 September 1925 – 7 December 2015) was an Anglo-Indian two time Olympic boxer. He competed at the 1948 Summer Olympics, losing to Dennis Shepherd of South Africa and tying 17th rank; and in the 1952 Summer Olympics, beating Ángel Leyes of Argentina and losing to Joseph Ventaja tying 9th rank.

Greve started boxing at a young age (aged 7) and went on to become the flyweight champion of India in 1943. He held the title for three years with wins in 1944 and 1945 and then went on to win the bantamweight title for 1946 and 1947. In 1948, he won the Pakistan flyweight championship and was among the first boxers to represent the new nation in international competition. He was selected to represent the country in the 1948 Olympics.

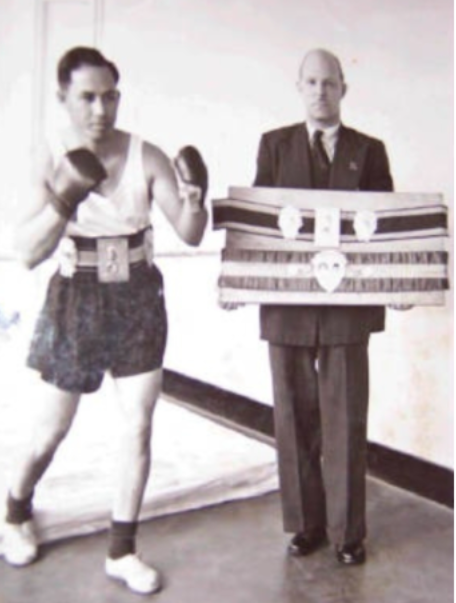
Sydney greve with medals

At the age of 27, he was widely regarded across Asia as one of the top amateur boxers in the subcontinent. Media coverage frequently referred to him by nicknames such as "Killer" and the "KO Kid," highlighting his high knockout rate. Press reports often described Sydney as a highly effective fighter, noting his hand speed and powerful finishing punch as major draws for audiences. Physically, he possessed a strong build with broad shoulders, combined with a strong sense of ring awareness that made him a highly competitive opponent.

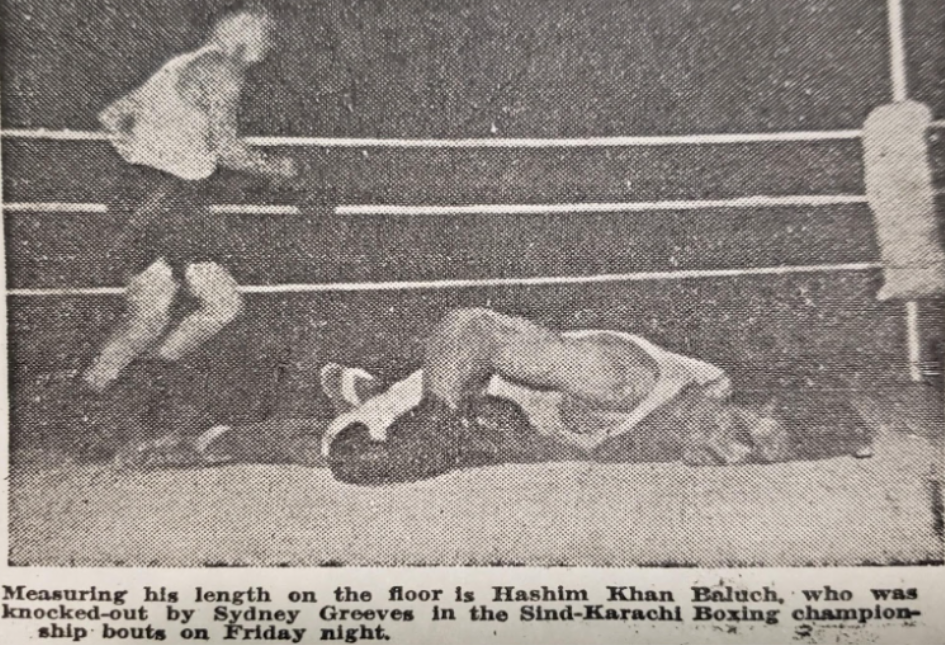
Sydney Greve knock-out of Hashim Khan Balunch on the Sind-Karachi boxing championship bouts.
