= Kasperczak =

- Henryk Kasperczak (born 1946), Polish former professional football manager and player
- Janusz Kasperczak (1927-2002), Polish boxer, European amateur champion in Oslo, 1949 (flyweight)
