= Maurice White (boxer) =

Pakistani boxer (1933–1996)

Personal information
- Nationality: Pakistani
- Born: 9 April 1933
- Died: 1996 (aged 62–63)

Sport
- Sport: Boxing

Maurice White (9 April 1933 – 1996) was a Pakistani amateur boxer. He competed in the men's featherweight event at the 1956 Summer Olympics. At the 1956 Summer Olympics, he lost to Tristán Falfán of Argentina in the Round of 16 after receiving a bye in the Round of 32. White died in 1996.
