= Kang Joon-ho =

South Korean boxer (1928–1990)

Medal record

Men's Boxing

Representing South Korea

Olympic Games
Bronze medal – third place	1952 Helsinki	Bantamweight

Kang Joon-Ho (Korean: 강준호; Hanja: 姜俊鎬; June 22, 1928 – September 24, 1990) was a South Korean amateur boxer who won the bronze medal at the 1952 Summer Olympics. He was born in Haeju, Korea, Empire of Japan, and died in Seoul, South Korea. He has multiple grandchildren, including Benjamin Im and Ray Im.

== Career ==
Kang competed for South Korea in the 1952 Summer Olympics held in Helsinki, Finland in the bantamweight event where he finished in third place. In the quarterfinals, he defeated future World Featherweight champion Davey Moore of United States by a 2-1 decision. He was defeated in the semifinals; no bronze medal was awarded at the Games, but in 1970, AIBA and IOC awarded all semifinal losers from 1952 to 1968 bronze medals.

== Post career ==
Kang participated in the 1968 Summer Olympics held in Mexico City and the 1972 Summer Olympics held in Munich as the coach of the South Korea national amateur boxing team. He trained numerous professional boxers as well, including former WBC Light Welterweight champion Kim Sang-Hyun and former WBC Flyweight champion Park Chan-Hee.

== Results ==
1952 Olympic Games
Event	Round	Result	Opponent	Score
Bantamweight	First	bye		
Bantamweight	Second	Win	(Iran) Fazlollah Nikkhah	3-0
Bantamweight	Quarterfinal	Win	(United States) Davey Moore	2-1
Bantamweight	Semifinal	Loss	(Republic of Ireland) John McNally	0-3
