= Angel Amaya =

Venezuelan boxer

Personal information
- Nationality: Venezuelan
- Born: 11 February 1934 (age 91)

Sport
- Sport: Boxing

Angel Amaya (born 11 February 1934) is a Venezuelan boxer. He competed in the men's bantamweight event at the 1952 Summer Olympics. At the 1952 Summer Olympics, he lost to Raúl Macías of Mexico.
