= Grönroos =

Grönroos is a Swedish-language surname, more common in Finland than in Sweden.

== Geographical distribution ==
As of 2014, 87.5% of all known bearers of the surname Grönroos were residents of Finland (frequency 1:2,486), 10.7% of Sweden (1:36,469) and 1.1% of Estonia (1:48,951).

In Finland, the frequency of the surname was higher than national average (1:2,486) in the following regions:

1. Satakunta (1:953)
2. Southwest Finland (1:994)
3. Åland (1:1,042)
4. Uusimaa (1:1,484)

In Sweden, the frequency of the surname was higher than national average (1:36,469) in the following counties:

1. Uppsala County (1:14,573)
2. Södermanland County (1:18,614)
3. Örebro County (1:20,372)
4. Halland County (1:20,386)
5. Östergötland County (1:23,031)
6. Västerbotten County (1:26,440)
7. Stockholm County (1:26,710)
8. Västernorrland County (1:27,107)

== People ==
- Börje Grönroos (1929–2015), Finnish boxer
- Christian Grönroos (born 1947), Finnish economist
