= Paulino Meléndres =

Filipino boxer (born 1927)

Personal information
- Nationality: Filipino
- Born: 1927

Boxing career
- Weight class: Featherweight

Paulino M. Meléndres (born 1927) was a Filipino boxer. He competed in the men's featherweight event at the 1956 Summer Olympics. At the 1956 Summer Olympics, he lost to Bernard Schröter of East Germany.
