= Boxing at the 1952 Summer Olympics – Middleweight =

Olympic boxing tournament

Middleweight boxing at the Games of the XV Olympiad
- Venue: Messuhalli
- Dates: 29 July – 2 August 1952
- Competitors: 23 from 23 nations

Medalists
1st place, gold medalist(s)		Floyd Patterson	United States
2nd place, silver medalist(s)		Vasile Tiță	Romania
3rd place, bronze medalist(s)		Boris Nikolov	Bulgaria
3rd place, bronze medalist(s)		Stig Sjölin	Sweden

The men's middleweight event was part of the boxing programme at the 1952 Summer Olympics. The weight class allowed boxers of up to 75 kilograms to compete. The competition was held from 29 July to 2 August 1952. 23 boxers from 23 nations competed.

== Medalists ==
Gold	Floyd Patterson; United States
Silver	Vasile Tiță; Romania
Bronze	Boris Nikolov; Bulgaria
Bronze	Stig Sjölin; Sweden

== Results ==
Winner	NOC	Result	Loser	NOC
First Round (July 29)
Floyd Patterson	United States	BYE
Omar Tebbaka	France	BYE
Leen Jansen	Netherlands	BYE
Robert Malouf	Canada	BYE
Anthony Madigan	Australia	BYE
Boris Silchev	Soviet Union	BYE
Stig Sjölin	Sweden	BYE
Börje Grönroos	Finland	BYE
Dieter Wemhöner	Germany	BYE
Bedřich Koutný	Czechoslovakia	2 – 1	Héctor Maturano	Argentina
Boris Nikolov	Bulgaria	3 – 0	Fred Stürmer	Luxembourg
Terry Gooding	Great Britain	2 – 1	Moustafa Mohamed Fahim	Egypt
Vasile Tiță	Romania	DSQ 3R	Willie Duggan	Ireland
Nelson Andrade	Brazil	2 – 1	Mátyás Plachy	Hungary
Valter Sentimenti	Italy	3 – 0	Hans Niederhauser	Switzerland
Muhammad Khan	Pakistan	2 – 1	Henryk Nowara	Poland
Second Round (July 29 & 30)
Floyd Patterson	United States	3 – 0	Omar Tebbaka	France
Leen Jansen	Netherlands	TKO 1R	Robert Malouf	Canada
Anthony Madigan	Australia	2 – 1	Boris Siljtshev	Soviet Union
Stig Sjölin	Sweden	3 – 0	Börje Grönroos	Finland
Dieter Wemhöner	Germany	2 – 1	Bedrich Koutný	Czechoslovakia
Boris Nikolov	Bulgaria	2 – 1	Terence Gooding	Great Britain
Vasile Tiță	Romania	DSQ 2R	Nelson de Paula Andrade	Brazil
Valter Sentimenti	Italy	3 – 0	Khan Mohammad	Pakistan
Third Round (July 31)
Boris Nikolov	Bulgaria	3 – 0	Dieter Wemhöner	Germany
Floyd Patterson	United States	KO 1R	Leen Jansen	Netherlands
Vasile Tiță	Romania	TKO 3R	Valter Sentimenti	Italy
Stig Sjölin	Sweden	3 – 0	Anthony Madigan	Australia
Semi-final (August 1)
Floyd Patterson	United States	DSQ 3R	Stig Sjölin	Sweden
Vasile Tiță	Romania	3 – 0	Boris Nikolov	Bulgaria
Final (August 2)
Floyd Patterson	United States	KO 1R	Vasile Tiță	Romania
