= 1949 European Amateur Boxing Championships =

Boxing competitions

- Host city: Oslo
- Country: Norway
- Nations: 16
- Athletes: 93
- Dates: 13–18 June

The 1949 European Amateur Boxing Championships were held in Oslo, Norway from 13 to 18 June. It was the eighth edition of the bi-annual competition was organised by the European governing body for amateur boxing, EABA. There were 93 fighters from 16 countries participating.

== Medal winners ==
Event	Gold	Silver	Bronze
Flyweight (– 50.8 kilograms)	Janusz Kasperczak; Poland	József Bednai; Hungary	Hans Schmöller; Austria
Bantamweight (– 53.5 kilograms)	Giovanni Zuddas; Italy	Henning Jensen; Denmark	Salvator Vangi; France
Featherweight (– 57.1 kilograms)	Jacques Bataille; France	Louis van Hoeck; Belgium	(Republic of Ireland) David O'Connell; Ireland
Lightweight (– 61.2 kilograms)	(Republic of Ireland) Michael McCullagh; Ireland	Mohammed Aimme; France	(Socialist Federal Republic of Yugoslavia) Pavle Šovljanski; Yugoslavia
Welterweight (– 66.7 kilograms)	Július Torma; Czechoslovakia	Victor Jörgensen; Denmark	Guy Toupé; France
Middleweight (– 72.6 kilograms)	László Papp; Hungary	Stig Sjölin; Sweden	Ivano Fontana; Italy
Light Heavyweight (– 79.4 kilograms)	Giacomo di Segni; Italy	Ota Rademacher; Czechoslovakia	Willy Schagen; Netherlands
Heavyweight (+ 79.4 kilograms)	László Bene; Hungary	Raymond Degl'Innocenti; France	Uber Baccilieri; Italy

== Medal table ==
Rank	Nation	Gold	Silver	Bronze	Total
1	Hungary (HUN)	2	1	0	3
2	Italy (ITA)	2	0	2	4
3	France (FRA)	1	2	2	5
4	Czechoslovakia (TCH)	1	1	0	2
5	Ireland (IRL)	1	0	1	2
6	Poland (POL)	1	0	0	1
7	Denmark (DEN)	0	2	0	2
8	Belgium (BEL)	0	1	0	1
8	Sweden (SWE)	0	1	0	1
10	Austria (AUT)	0	0	1	1
10	Netherlands (NED)	0	0	1	1
10	Yugoslavia (YUG)	0	0	1	1
Totals (12 entries)		8	8	8	24
