= Angel Figueroa (boxer) =

Puerto Rican boxer (1929–1953)

Personal information
- Nationality: Puerto Rican
- Born: 29 August 1929 Santurce, Puerto Rico
- Died: 20 May 1953 (aged 23) The Punchbowl, Korea

Sport
- Sport: Boxing

Angel Luis Figueroa Otero (29 August 1929 – 20 May 1953) was a Puerto Rican boxer. He competed in the men's bantamweight event at the 1952 Summer Olympics. A year later, he died fighting for the United States in the Korean War.

== 1952 Summer Olympics ==
Figueroa fought in the men's bantamweight event at the 1952 Summer Olympics representing Puerto Rico. He defeated Tiến Vình, representing Vietnam, on points in his opening bout. He was eliminated in his next fight - on points - by František Majdloch, of Czechoslovakia.

== Personal life ==
Figueroa served as a private in the 223rd Infantry Regiment, United States Army during the Korean War. He was killed in action at the Punchbowl on 20 May 1953. He was buried at the Puerto Rico National Cemetery in Bayamón, Puerto Rico.
