= Fazlollah Nikkhah =

Iranian boxer

Personal information
- Nationality: Iranian
- Born: 24 July 1930
- Died: 28 May 2014 (aged 83)

Sport
- Sport: Boxing

Fazlollah Nikkhah (24 July 1930 – 28 May 2014) was an Iranian boxer. He competed in the men's bantamweight event at the 1952 Summer Olympics. At the 1952 Summer Olympics, he lost to Kang Joon-ho of South Korea.
