= Nontasilp Thayansilp =

Thai boxer

Personal information
- Nationality: Thai
- Born: 1936 (age 88–89)

Sport
- Sport: Boxing

Nontasilp Thayansilp (born 1936) is a Thai boxer. He competed in the men's featherweight event at the 1956 Summer Olympics.
