= Toshihito Ishimaru =

Japanese boxer (1931–2000)

Personal information
- Nationality: Japanese
- Born: 4 April 1931 Japan
- Died: 11 March 2000 (aged 68)

Sport
- Sport: Boxing

Toshihito Ishimaru (石丸 利人, Ishimaru Toshihito; 4 April 1931 – 11 March 2000) was a Japanese boxer. He competed at the 1952 Summer Olympics and the 1956 Summer Olympics. At the 1952 Summer Olympics, he lost to Pedro Galasso of Brazil. Ishimaru died on 11 March 2000, at the age of 68.

== 1956 Olympic results ==
Below is the record of Toshihito Ishimaru, a Japanese lightweight boxer who competed at the 1956 Melbourne Olympics:

- Round of 32: defeated Paddy Donovan (New Zealand) on points
- Round of 16: lost to Anatoly Lagetko (Soviet Union) on points
