= Boris Silchev =

Soviet boxer

Personal information
- Nationality: Soviet
- Born: 7 February 1926
- Died: 6 April 2003 (aged 77)

Sport
- Sport: Boxing

Boris Silchev (7 February 1926 – 6 April 2003) was a Soviet boxer. He competed in the men's middleweight event at the 1952 Summer Olympics. At the 1952 Summer Olympics, he lost to Anthony Madigan of Australia.
