= Percy Lewis (boxer) =

Trinidad and Tobago boxer

Personal information
- Born: 31 December 1928 Trinidad and Tobago
- Died: 3 October 2019 (aged 90)
- Weight: feather/super feather/lightweight

Boxing career

Boxing record
- Total fights: 30
- Wins: 19 (KO 8)
- Losses: 10 (KO 2)
- Draws: 1

Percival Joseph Lewis (31 December 1928 – 3 October 2019), better known as Percy Lewis, was a Trinidad and Tobago-British amateur featherweight and professional feather/super feather/lightweight boxer of the 1950s and 60s.

== Boxing career ==
=== Amateur career ===
As an amateur Lewis was runner-up for the 1950 Amateur Boxing Association of England (ABAE) featherweight title, against Peter Brander (Slough Centre ABC), boxing out of The Royal Air Force, was runner-up for the 1951 Amateur Boxing Association of England (ABAE) featherweight title, against Jim Travers (Lansdowne BC), boxing out of The Royal Air Force, won the 1952 Amateur Boxing Association of England (ABAE) featherweight title, against Steve Trainer (Hulme Lads ABC), boxing out of The Royal Air Force, represented Great Britain at featherweight in the Boxing at the 1952 Summer Olympics, losing to Georghe Ilie of Romania, and won the 1953 Amateur Boxing Association of England (ABAE) featherweight title, against Alan Sillett (The British Army), boxing out of Oxford YMCA ABC,

=== Professional career ===
As a professional Lewis won the British Empire featherweight title, his professional fighting weight varied from 124 1/2 lb (56.5 kg; 8 st 12.5 lb), i.e. featherweight to 134 lb (61 kg; 9 st 8 lb), i.e. lightweight, he served with the Royal Air Force. He died in October 2019 at the age of 90.
