= Agostino Cossia =

Italian boxer

Personal information
- Nationality: Italian
- Born: 21 December 1930; Naples, Italy
- Died: 14 September 2016 (aged 79); Naples, Italy

Sport
- Sport: Boxing

Agostino Cossia (21 December 1930 – 14 September 2016) was an Italian boxer. He competed in the men's featherweight event at the 1956 Summer Olympics. At the 1956 Summer Olympics, he lost to Vladimir Safronov of the Soviet Union.
