= Rómulo Parés =

Argentine boxer (1925–2000)

Personal information
- Nationality: Argentine
- Born: 20 March 1925
- Died: 28 January 2000 (aged 74)

Sport
- Sport: Boxing

Rómulo Parés (20 March 1925 – 28 January 2000) was an Argentine boxer. He competed in the men's bantamweight event at the 1952 Summer Olympics.
