= Thomas Reddy =

Irish boxer

Personal information
- Nationality: Irish
- Born: 23 July 1929
- Died: 27 May 1992 (aged 62); Dublin, Ireland

Sport
- Sport: Boxing

Thomas Reddy (23 July 1929 – 27 May 1992) was an Irish boxer. He competed in the men's featherweight event at the 1952 Summer Olympics.
