= Tiến Vình =

Vietnamese boxer

Personal information
- Nationality: Vietnamese
- Born: 1 October 1920

Sport
- Sport: Boxing

Tiến Vình (born 1 October 1920) was a Vietnamese boxer. He competed in the men's bantamweight event at the 1952 Summer Olympics. At the 1952 Summer Olympics, he lost to Angel Figueroa of Puerto Rico.
