= Alfred Willommet =

Swiss boxer (born 1926)

Personal information
- Full name: Alfred Paul Willommet
- Nationality: Swiss
- Born: 17 August 1926 Vevey, Switzerland

Sport
- Sport: Boxing

Alfred Paul Willommet (born 17 August 1926) was a Swiss boxer. He competed in the men's featherweight event at the 1952 Summer Olympics.
