= John McNally (boxer) =

Irish boxer (1932–2022)

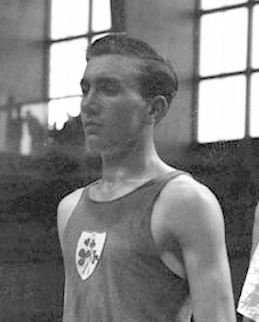
- McNally at the 1952 Olympics

Personal information
- Born: 3 November 1932 Belfast, Northern Ireland
- Died: 4 April 2022 (aged 89) Belfast, Northern Ireland

Sport
- Sport: Boxing
Medal record
Representing Ireland
Olympic Games
Silver medal – second place	1952 Helsinki	-54 kg
European Championships
Bronze medal – third place	1953 Warsaw	-54 kg

John McNally (3 November 1932 – 4 April 2022) was an Irish boxer who won a silver medal at the 1952 Summer Olympics in the bantamweight division. In the final McNally lost a split decision to Pentti Hämäläinen of Finland.

== Early life ==
McNally was born and raised in the Pound Loney area of west Belfast. He was the first person from Belfast and the first Irish boxer to win an Olympic medal.

In 1953, McNally won a bronze medal at the European championships and a gold in the Golden Gloves Championships representing Europe against the US in Chicago. McNally, within the space of a year, beat three American Golden Gloves champions and was awarded an honorary pair of Golden Gloves in recognition of this achievement. In 1953, he was made the official bantamweight champion of Germany in recognition of his feat of having defeated that country's three former bantamweight champions in the space of a year.

== 1952 Olympic results ==
Bantamweight

- Last 32: bye
- Last 16: defeated Alejandro Ortuose (Philippines) by unanimous decision (3-0)
- Quarter-final: defeated Vincenzo Dall'osso (Italy) by unanimous decision (3-0)
- Semi-final: defeated Kang Joon-Ho (South Korea) by unanimous decision (3-0)
- Final: lost to Pentti Hamalainen (Finland) by majority decision (1-2)

== Pro career ==
In 1954 McNally turned professional but his pro career did not reach the heights of his amateur days. He fought only 25 times and finished with a record of 14 wins, 9 defeats and 2 draws.

== Honours and later life ==
On 25 October 2007 John McNally was recognised by the Sports Council of Northern Ireland for his contribution to Irish sport at a gala event held at Stormont in Belfast. On 4 January 2008 John McNally was inducted into the Irish Boxing Hall of Fame by RTÉ's Jimmy Magee at an awards night held in the National Stadium in Dublin. A biography of McNally's life and career has been published by Appletree Press.

McNally died in Belfast on 4 April 2022, aged 89.
