= Willie Duggan (boxer) =

Irish boxer

Personal information
- Nationality: Irish
- Born: 4 December 1925; Dublin, Ireland
- Died: 4 April 2014 (aged 88); Dublin, Ireland

Sport
- Sport: Boxing

Willie Duggan (4 December 1925 – 4 April 2014) was an Irish boxer. He competed in the men's middleweight event at the 1952 Summer Olympics.
