= Thomas Nicholls (boxer) =

English boxer (1931–2021)

Tommy Nicholls
Personal information
- Nationality: British (English)
- Born: 12 October 1931 South Elmsall, West Riding of Yorkshire, England
- Died: 31 July 2021 (aged 89) Telford, Shropshire, England

Sport
- Sport: boxing
Medal record
Men's Boxing
Olympic Games
Representing Great Britain
Silver medal – second place	1956 Melbourne	Featherweight
European Amateur Championships
Representing England
Gold medal – first place	1955 West Berlin	Featherweight

Thomas G. Nicholls (12 October 1931 – 31 July 2021) was an English boxer, who won the silver medal representing Great Britain in the featherweight division (– 57 kg) at the 1956 Summer Olympics in Melbourne, Australia.

== Biography ==
Nicholls was born at South Elmsall, Yorkshire, in 1931, son of Jack, a miner, who moved with his family to Wellington, Shropshire when Thomas was aged seven or eight.

He won the 1951 and 1952 Amateur Boxing Association British bantamweight titles and the 1955 and 1956 featherweight titles, when boxing out of the Slough Centre ABC, when boxing out of the Royal Air Force BC and the Sankeys ABC respectively.

He competed at the 1952 and 1956 Olympic Games, reaching the final in 1956, where he was defeated by Vladimir Safronov of the Soviet Union. He also competed at the 1952 Summer Olympics, where he was beaten in the second round by eventual gold medalist Pentti Hämäläinen from Finland.

It was at Wellington he began training in his sport at Sankey's boxing club. He retired from professional boxing in 1957. He was living at Brandlee, Dawley at the time of his Olympic appearances but later returned to live in Wellington.

He married in 1955 June Clift, who predeceased him. They had a son, Mark, and daughter, Carol, who survived him. He died at Lightmoor View Care Home in Telford, Shropshire in July 2021 aged 89. His funeral took place at Emstrey Crematorium, Shrewsbury, on 19 August following.

== Olympic results ==
1952 (as a Bantamweight)

- Lost to Pentti Hämäläinen (Finland) 3-0

1956 (as a Featherweight)

- 1st round bye
- Defeated Noel Hazard (Australia) points
- Defeated Shinetsu Suzuki (Japan) points
- Defeated Pentti Hämäläinen (Finland) points
- Lost to Vladimir Safronov (Soviet Union) points

== Amateur accomplishments ==
- 1951 ABA Bantamweight champion
- 1952 ABA Bantamweight champion
- 1955 European Featherweight Champion in West Berlin
- 1955 ABA Featherweight champion
- 1956 ABA Featherweight champion
