= Nelson Andrade =

Brazilian boxer

Personal information
- Born: 18 April 1933; Botucatu, Brazil
- Died: 16 March 1981 (aged 47)

Sport
- Sport: Boxing

Nelson Andrade (18 April 1933 – 16 March 1981) was a Brazilian boxer. He competed in the men's middleweight event at the 1952 Summer Olympics.
