= Hassan Pakandam =

Iranian Olympic boxer (1934–2013)

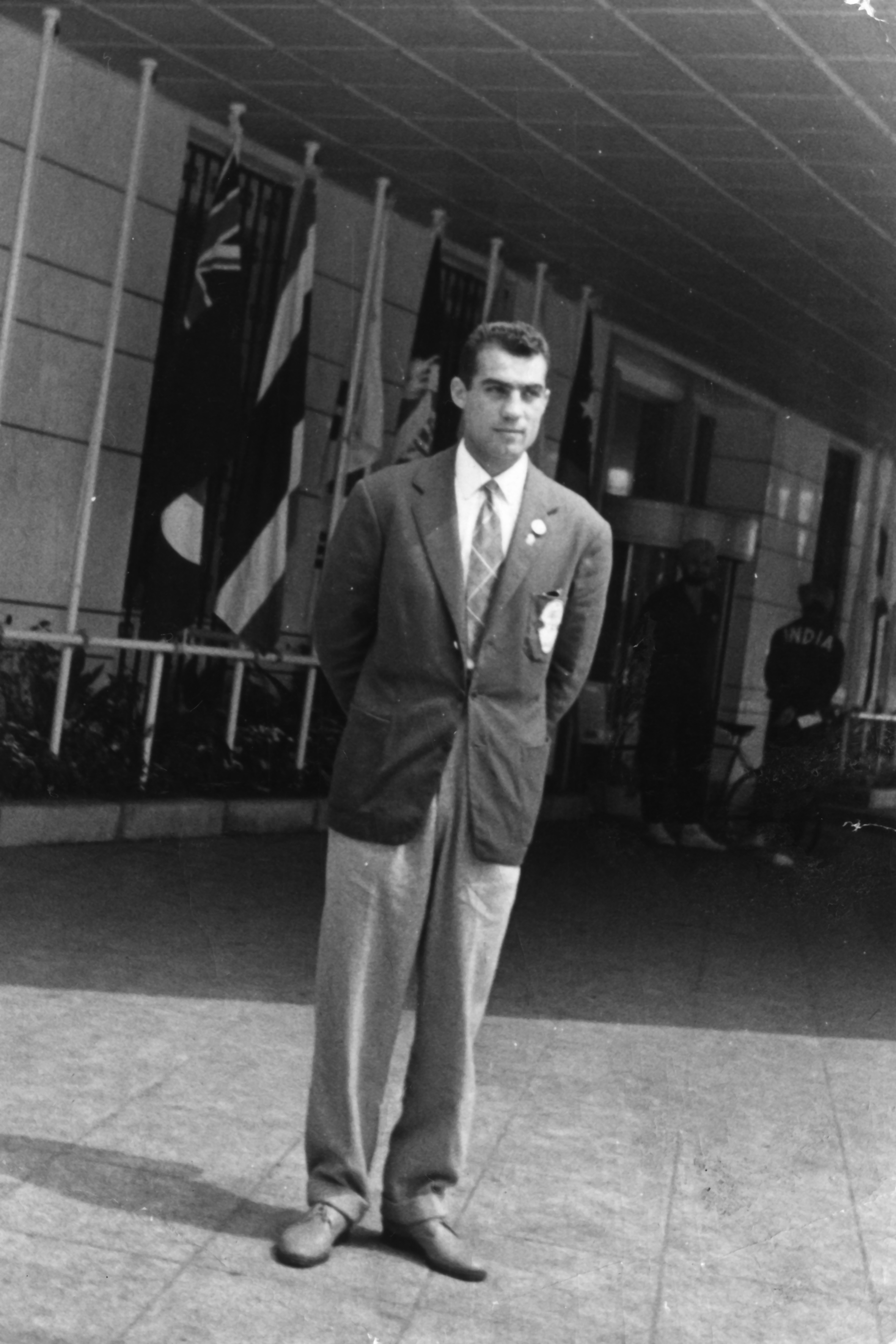
- Hassan Pakandam, Dai-ichi Hotel Tokyo, 1958 Asian Games

Personal information
- Nationality: Iranian
- Born: May 19, 1934 Tehran, Iran
- Died: July 16, 2013 Tehran, Iran
- Weight: Lightweight

Boxing career
- Stance: Orthodox

Hassan Pakandam (Persian: حسن پاک اندام; May 19, 1934 in Tehran – July 16, 2013 in Tehran) was a member of Iran senior national boxing team from 1955, continuously until 1965, and a member of Tehran Taj (Persian: تاج تهران) Boxing Club from 1950 to 1965, boxing in the 60, 63.5, and 67 kg divisions. He was a well-built, skilled, swift, and intelligent all-around boxer. His recognized punch was a powerful cross. He participated at the 1958 Asian Games, and also as team captain at the 1964 Summer Olympics, in the Lightweight division and was also selected for the Lightweight division of the Iranian national boxing team, to participate in the 1962 Asian Games.

== Boxing career ==
Pakandam joined the Niroo va Rasti (Power and Virtue) Club (Persian: نیرو و راستی) in 1949 at the age of fifteen. In 1950, he became a member of Tehran Taj Boxing Club, and with the club team played his first official senior match in Ankara, Turkey, representing Iran, in 1953 at the age of nineteen. He participated in numerous international and national matches with Tehran Taj boxing team, representing Iran, up to 1955, when he was officially selected for Iran senior national boxing team. The Tehran Taj boxing club made the backbone of the senior national boxing team for the next decade, including the team that participated in the 1958 Asian Games, in Tokyo, managing to rank second, considering medal counts, and fifth in the overall boxing table.

In Tokyo 1958, the Iranian boxers at the 1958 Asian Games were participating for the first time in the Third Asian Games, with a team of nine boxers. Pakandam which was selected as a member of the team, in the 60 kg division, faced Chung Dong-Hoon from South Korea in the quarterfinal. After multiple injuries were inflicted to his face during their match, he finally lost on points to Chung Dong-Hoon the eventual gold medal winner of the division, and obtained the fifth place of the division.

In 1962, bringing on the experience of the previous Asian Games, and numerous matches, following extensive training, a very ready Pakandam, at the peak of his boxing career, was selected for Jakarta, Indonesia, 1962 Asian Games, succeeding Iran national championship matches held in Tehran, after defeating all opponents decisively. Later on, Iran National Olympic Committee (N.O.C.IRAN) decided not to participate in the games, with any sports team, mentioning lack of adequate national budget, as the reason.

In March 1963, as a prelude to selecting Iran's national boxing team for the 1964 Summer Olympics, the All - Tehran boxing competition was organized by Iran Boxing Federation, in which Pakandam defeated all his opponents and became champion of the tournament in the Welterweight division. In the round of 32 of the Lightweight division of the boxing competition in the 1964 Summer Olympics, in which Pakandam represented Iran national boxing team as Iranian captain, he faced Stoyan Pilichev from Bulgaria, and due to a cut above his eye, and bleeding, the referee stopped the contest (RSC), in the third round. Pilichev advanced to the quarterfinals, in which he lost to Józef Grudzień from Poland; the eventual gold medal winner.

In an interview in 1976, about the 1964 Summer Olympics, Pakandam told Maria Sadeghi Lahijani, a Tehran University journalism student, writing her university thesis; "Iran in the 1964 Summer Olympics", that the Iranian boxing team participants, including himself, had to reduce their weight to a great amount before the tournament started resulting in their excess weakness. Pakandam had become Iran national boxing champion in the Welterweight category a year before the 1964 Summer Olympics, whereas he participated in the boxing Lightweight division of Tokyo 1964. Non of the Iranian boxing team participants were able to reach the quarter finals. In the interview he said that in order to face experienced and powerful opponents in a tournament such as the Summer Olympics, extensive planning and preparedness was required, something the Iranian boxing team lacked at that time. The Iranian national boxing team did not have participants for all weight categories, before the tournament started, and they only participated with five boxers. He mentioned that he helped train his teammates during the tournament, since their appointed coach was not experienced in the field. Unfortunately Petros Nazarbegian, the experienced and famous Iran national boxing coach, who had successfully coached Pakandam in the national boxing team and Taj club, for around a decade, had retired from national coaching, after the championship matches held for selecting the national boxing team to participate in the 1962 Asian Games. Pakandam also stated that if he had competed in a higher weight division, instead of the 60 kg division, advancing further in the tournament was possible. He retired from championship boxing and the Iranian national boxing team, a year after the 1964 Summer Olympics.

== Personal ==
Pakandam was born near Abshar alley, Rey street, Tehran, Iran, where he grew up. He married in 1970 and his son was born in 1971. As a main profession, he worked for the Telecommunication Company of Iran until retirement. His funeral procession was held on July 17, 2013 in Tehran, from Shahid Shiroudi Stadium to Behesht-e Zahra cemetery in the “celebrity” (Naam Avaran) section (Persian: نام آوران), where he is buried. The grand ceremony was held with a widespread attendance of family, relatives, friends, Iran sportspeople, and especially Iran boxing community.
