= Martin Smyth (boxer) =

Irish boxer, 20th century

Personal information
- Nationality: Irish
- Born: 12 November 1936; Belfast, Northern Ireland
- Died: 25 November 2012 (aged 76); Seattle, Washington, United States

Sport
- Sport: Boxing

Martin Smyth (12 November 1936 – 25 November 2012) was an Irish boxer. He competed in the men's featherweight event at the 1956 Summer Olympics.
