= Héctor Maturano =

Argentine boxer

Personal information
- Born: 23 July 1921; Buenos Aires, Argentina
- Died: 5 October 1986 (aged 65)

Sport
- Sport: Boxing

Héctor Juliano Maturano Giuranovich (23 July 1921 – 5 October 1986) was an Argentine boxer. He competed in the men's middleweight event at the 1952 Summer Olympics.
