= Egon Schidan =

German boxer

Personal information
- Nationality: German
- Born: 16 September 1930
- Died: 7 August 2002 (aged 71)

Sport
- Sport: Boxing

Egon Schidan (16 September 1930 – 7 August 2002) was a German boxer. He competed in the men's bantamweight event at the 1952 Summer Olympics.
