= Henryk Nowara =

Polish boxer

Personal information
- Nationality: Polish
- Born: 14 June 1924; Chorzów, Poland
- Died: 28 November 2001 (aged 77); Chorzów, Poland

Sport
- Sport: Boxing

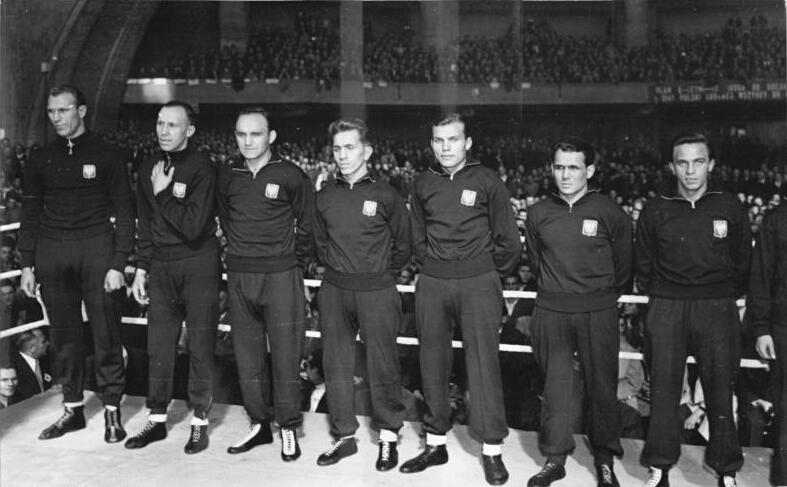
Group Photo showing Henryk Nowara

Henryk Nowara (14 June 1924 – 28 November 2001) was a Polish boxer. He competed in the men's middleweight event at the 1952 Summer Olympics.
