= Kurt Schirra =

German boxer

Personal information
- Nationality: German
- Born: 13 September 1931 Völklingen, Germany
- Died: 17 May 1983 (aged 51) Saarbrücken, West Germany

Sport
- Sport: Boxing

Kurt Schirra (13 September 1931 – 17 May 1983) was a German boxer. He competed in the men's featherweight event at the 1952 Summer Olympics, representing Saar.
