= Edson Brown =

American boxer

Personal information
- Born: May 16, 1935 New York, New York, United States
- Died: September 12, 1962 (aged 27)

Sport
- Sport: Boxing

Edson Brown (May 16, 1935 – September 12, 1962) was an American amateur boxer. He competed in the men's featherweight event at the 1952 Summer Olympics. He won the New York Golden Gloves featherweight title in 1953 and 1954, and was an Eastern Golden Gloves champion as well.

Brown was called "Little Joe" due to his resemblance to Jersey Joe Walcott. He died on September 12, 1962, at the age of 27.
