= Muhammad Khan (boxer) =

Pakistani boxer (1928–2013)

Personal information
- Nationality: Pakistani
- Born: 4 July 1928
- Died: 18 March 2013 (aged 84); London, England

Sport
- Sport: Boxing

Muhammad Khan (4 July 1928 – 18 March 2013) was a Pakistani boxer. He competed in the men's middleweight event at the 1952 Summer Olympics.
