= Terry Gooding =

British boxer (1931–2018)

Personal information
- Nationality: British
- Born: 15 April 1931 Cardiff, Wales
- Died: 1 October 2018 (aged 87)

Sport
- Sport: Boxing

Terence Joseph Gooding (15 April 1931 – 1 October 2018) was a British professional boxer. After winning several amateur titles, he was selected to represent Great Britain in the men's middleweight event at the 1952 Summer Olympics in Helsinki, Finland. After winning his first bout, he was eliminated in the second round. He turned professional in 1954, enjoying a strong start to his career by winning his first 12 bouts and earning a Welsh light-heavyweight title bout against Ken Rowlands, which he lost. After a second defeat, he retired from professional boxing.

== Career ==
=== Amateur ===
Gooding was born in Cardiff, Wales. He began boxing at the age of nine and enjoyed a successful youth career. He was chosen to represent Wales for the first time at the age of 17, winning his debut bout in Dublin. In the following year, he reached final of the Welsh Amateur Boxing Association middleweight division and won the Welsh Senior Youth title. In 1952, having begun his National Service, Gooding won the army and inter-services championship and also won the Amateur Boxing Association 1952 middleweight title, when boxing for the Army.

His form resulted in him being selected for the Great Britain boxing team to represent the nation at the 1952 Summer Olympics in Helsinki, Finland at the age of 21. One of only two Welsh fighters in the squad, along with Dai Dower, Gooding was the only member of the squad selected without a trial. At the Games, Golding was drawn against Egyptian fighter Moustafa Fahim in the first round, defeating his opponent via a judges decision. In the second round, Gooding fought Bulgarian Boris Nikolov but was eliminated after losing the fight by decision.

=== Professional ===
Gooding completed his National Service in 1953 and had no plans to continue his boxing career. However, he was convinced to turn professional by boxing manager Sam Burns and won his first professional fight in May 1954 against Mick Endley by decision. Including his victory over Endley, Gooding won his first 12 bouts in his first year as a professional. His record saw him ranked as the number four light-heavyweight in Britain and prompted a Welsh title bout against fellow Welshman Ken Rowlands. However, Rowlands won the fight by TKO after the referee stopped the fight in the sixth round. Gooding suffered a second defeat against Arthur Howard three months later and retired from boxing.

== Personal life ==
Gooding met his wife Audrey during his boxing career; the pair married in September 1957 at St. Alan's Church in Splott. The couple had two children together, Paul and Debbie.

After retiring from Boxing, Gooding worked as a construction manager and started two companies, Sibex and TG Engineering International. He died in October 2018 at the age of 87.
