= Omar Tebbaka =

French boxer

Personal information
- Nationality: French
- Born: 29 January 1929; Annaba, Algeria
- Died: 30 September 1998 (aged 69); Aubagne, France

Sport
- Sport: Boxing

Rene Omar Tebbaka (29 January 1929 – 30 September 1998) was a French boxer. He competed in the men's middleweight event at the 1952 Summer Olympics. At the 1952 Summer Olympics, he lost to Floyd Patterson of the United States.
