= Fred Stürmer =

Luxembourgish boxer

Personal information
- Nationality: Luxembourgish
- Born: 25 October 1927; Dudelange, Luxembourg
- Died: 6 November 2014 (aged 87); Contern, Luxembourg

Sport
- Sport: Boxing

Fred Stürmer (25 October 1927 – 6 November 2014) was a Luxembourgish boxer. He competed in the men's middleweight event at the 1952 Summer Olympics. At the 1952 Summer Olympics, he lost to Boris Nikolov of Bulgaria.
