= Mátyás Plachy =

Hungarian boxer

Personal information
- Nationality: Hungarian
- Born: 24 May 1930; Budapest, Hungary
- Died: 28 June 1993 (aged 63)

Sport
- Sport: Boxing

Mátyás Plachy (24 May 1930 – 28 June 1993) was a Hungarian boxer. He competed in the men's middleweight event at the 1952 Summer Olympics.
