= Stig Sjölin =

Swedish boxer

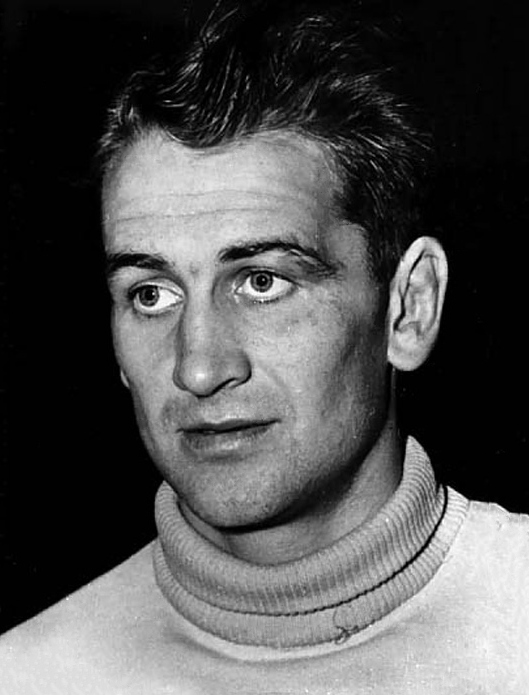

Personal information
- Born: 21 December 1928 Värnamo, Sweden
- Died: 9 January 1995 (aged 66) Helsingborg, Sweden

Sport
- Sport: Boxing
- Club: Värnamo BK
Medal record
Representing Sweden
Olympic Games
Bronze medal – third place	1952 Helsinki	Middleweight
European Championships
Silver medal – second place	1949 Oslo	72.6 kg
Gold medal – first place	1951 Milan	75 kg
Bronze medal – third place	1953 Warsaw	75 kg
Silver medal – second place	1955 West Berlin	75 kg

Stig Karl Olof Sjölin (21 December 1928 – 9 January 1995) was a Swedish middleweight boxer. He competed at the 1952 and 1956 Olympics and finished in third and ninth place, respectively. Between 1949 and 1955 he won four medals at European championships.
