= Jens Andersen (boxer) =

Danish boxer (1929–2010)

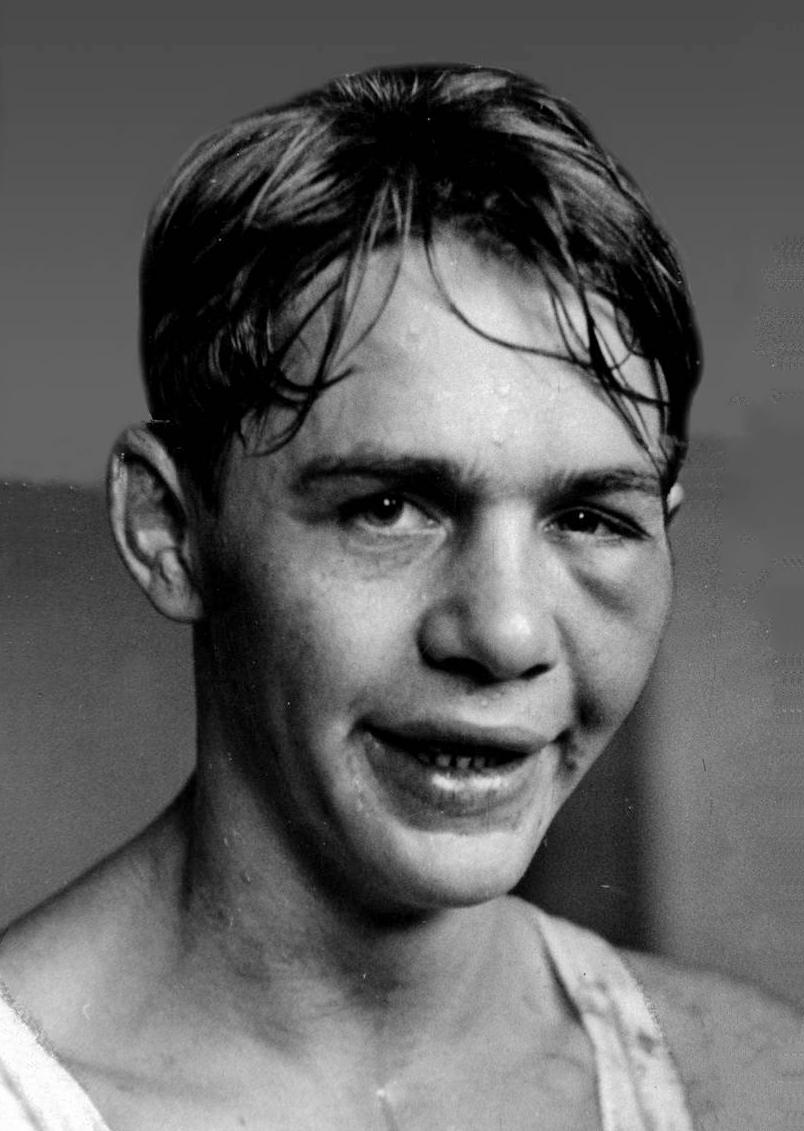
- Jens Andersen in 1951

Personal information
- Born: 28 June 1929 Solbjerg, Denmark
- Died: 24 April 2010 (aged 80) Løgstør, Denmark

Sport
- Sport: Boxing
- Club: FAK, Århus
Medal record
Representing Denmark
European Championships
Silver medal – second place	1951 Milan	-71 kg

Jens Christian Andersen (28 June 1929 – 24 April 2010) was a Danish amateur boxer who won a silver medal in the light-middleweight division at the 1951 European Championships, losing in the final to László Papp. He competed in the 1956 Summer Olympics, but was eliminated in the first bout.
