= Noel Hazard =

Australian boxer (1936–2024)

Personal information
- Nationality: Australian
- Born: 19 February 1936
- Died: 18 July 2024 (aged 88)

Sport
- Sport: Boxing

Noel Hazard (19 February 1936 – 18 July 2024) was an Australian boxer. He competed in the men's featherweight event at the 1956 Summer Olympics. At the 1956 Summer Olympics, he lost to Thomas Nicholls of Great Britain. Hazard, who was an electrician by trade, died on 18 July 2024, at the age of 88.
