= Salah El-Din Fatih =

Egyptian boxer

Personal information
- Nationality: Egyptian
- Born: 15 March 1924; Kafr El Dawwar, Egypt

Sport
- Sport: Boxing

Salah El-Din Fatih (born 15 March 1924) was an Egyptian boxer. He competed in the men's featherweight event at the 1952 Summer Olympics.
