= Donald McDonnell =

Australian boxer (1933–2021)

Personal information
- Nationality: Australian
- Born: 5 November 1933; Sydney, Australia
- Died: 11 March 2021 (aged 87)

Sport
- Sport: Boxing

Donald McDonnell (5 November 1933 – 11 March 2021) was an Australian boxer. He competed in the men's featherweight event at the 1952 Summer Olympics.
