= Yury Sokolov (boxer) =

Russian boxer (1929–2016)

Personal information
- Nationality: Russian
- Born: 11 May 1929; Ivanovo, Russian SFSR, Soviet Union
- Died: 3 March 2016 (aged 86); Moscow, Russia

Sport
- Sport: Boxing

Yury Sokolov (11 May 1929 – 3 March 2016) was a Russian boxer. He competed in the men's featherweight event at the 1952 Summer Olympics. Sokolov died in Moscow on 3 March 2016, at the age of 86.
