= El Ratón (film) =

- Directed by: Chano Urueta
- Cinematography: Manuel Gomez Urquiza
- Music by: Sergio Guerrero
- Release date: 1957
- Country: Mexico
- Language: Spanish

El Ratón ("The Mouse") is a 1957 Mexican film directed by Chano Urueta.

It stars the famous world boxing champion Raul Macias, playing a version of himself.

== Cast ==
- Raul Macias
- Anabelle Gutierrez
- Alfredo Sadel
- Quintín Bulnes
- Miguel Manzano
