= Stevan Redli =

Yugoslav boxer (1930–2010)

Personal information
- Nationality: Yugoslav
- Born: 11 December 1930 Novi Sad, Yugoslavia
- Died: 2010 (aged 79–80) Serbia

Sport
- Sport: Boxing

Stevan Redli (11 December 1930 – 2010) was a Yugoslav boxer. He competed in the men's featherweight event at the 1952 Summer Olympics. Redli died in Serbia in 2010.
