= Tristán Falfán =

Argentine boxer (1939–2023)

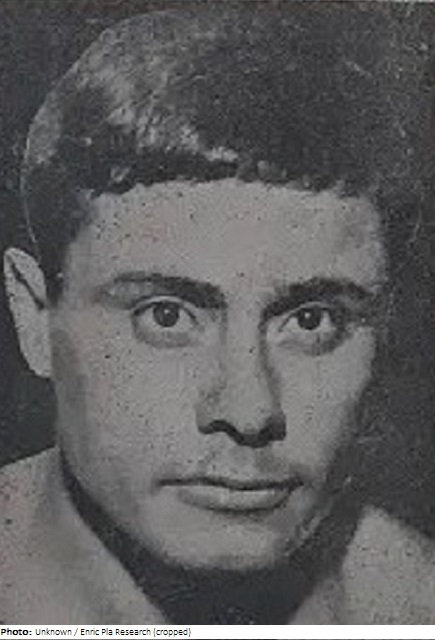
- Falfán in 1956

Personal information
- Full name: Tristán Octavio Falfán
- Born: 8 October 1939; Córdoba, Argentina
- Died: 25 July 2023 (aged 83); Córdoba, Argentina

Sport
- Sport: Boxing

Tristán Octavio Falfán (8 October 1939 – 25 July 2023) was an Argentine boxer. He competed in the men's featherweight event at the 1956 Summer Olympics. Falfán began boxing at the age of 12 and became a professional boxer in 1957. He fought in 55 bouts, where he won 38 of them, including 19 by knockout.
