= André de Souza =

French boxer (1936–2025)

Personal information
- Full name: Andre Manuel De Sousa
- Nationality: French
- Born: 29 January 1936 Lézignan-Corbières, France
- Died: 18 March 2025 (aged 89) Lézignan-Corbières, France

Sport
- Sport: Boxing

André De Sousa or De Souza (29 January 1936 – 18 March 2025) was a French boxer. He competed in the men's featherweight event at the 1956 Summer Olympics. He died on 18 March 2025, at the age of 88.
