= Gheorghe Ilie =

Romanian boxer

Personal information
- Nationality: Romanian
- Born: 14 June 1927

Sport
- Sport: Boxing

Gheorghe Ilie (born 14 June 1927) was a Romanian boxer. He competed in the men's featherweight event at the 1952 Summer Olympics.
