= Yaichit Wang =

Burmese boxer

Personal information
- Nationality: Burmese
- Born: 12 December 1937 (age 87)

Sport
- Sport: Boxing

Yaichit Wang (born 12 December 1937) is a Burmese boxer. He competed in the men's featherweight event at the 1956 Summer Olympics.
