= Lennie von Graevenitz =

South African boxer

Personal information
- Nationality: South African
- Born: 3 January 1935; Johannesburg, South Africa
- Died: 9 September 2010 (aged 75); Pretoria, South Africa

Sport
- Sport: Boxing

Lennie von Graevenitz (3 January 1935 – 9 September 2010) was a South African boxer. He competed in the men's bantamweight event at the 1952 Summer Olympics.
