= Bedřich Koutný =

Czechoslovak boxer (1931–1988)

Personal information
- Nationality: Czechoslovak
- Born: 6 March 1931
- Died: May 1988

Sport
- Sport: Boxing

Bedřich Koutný (6 March 1931 – May 1988) was a Czechoslovak boxer. He competed in the men's middleweight event at the 1952 Summer Olympics.
