= South Korea national amateur boxing athletes =

South Korea national amateur boxing athletes represents South Korea in regional, continental and world matches and tournaments sanctioned by the Amateur International Boxing Association (AIBA).

== Olympics ==
=== 2004 Athens Olympics ===
Seven amateur boxers represented South Korea in this edition of the Olympiad winning two bronze medals from the Featherweight and the Welterweight division. This country is ranked 12th in a four-way tie in the boxing medal tally.

==== Entry list ====
- Hong Moo Won (Light Flyweight)
- Kim Kim-suk (Flyweight)
- Kim Won Il (Bantamweight)
- Seok Hwan Jo (Featherweight) - Bronze
- Jong Sub Baik (Lightweight)
- Kim Jung Joo (Welterweight) - Bronze
- Song Hak Sung (Light heavyweight)

== Asian Games ==
=== 2006 Doha Asian Games ===
Ten amateur boxers represented Korea in this edition of the Asiad, winning three silver medals and one bronze medal. This country is ranked 8th with a total of 4 medals.

==== Entry list ====
- A'nyo Lee Jynnings {Heavyweight) - Gold
- Jong Sub Baik (Lightweight)
- Deok Jin Cho (Middleweight)
- Soon Chul Han (Bantamweight) - Silver
- Moo Won Hong (Light Flyweight) - Bronze
- Byeong Gook Jeon (Heavyweight)
- Seok Hwan Jo (Featherweight)
- Kim Jung Joo (Welterweight)
- Ok Sung Lee (Flyweight)
- Myung Hoon Shin (Lightwelterweight) - Silver
- Hak Sung Song (Light Heavyweight) - Silver

==== 2010 youth boxing state finalists ====
- Ko Un (Lightweight)
- Kim Sowol (Lightweight) (Vice Captain)
- Yun Dong-ju (Lightweight)- Gold
- Han Jung-Woo (Lightweight)(Captain)- Bronze
- Park Mok-wol (Light Heavyweight)
- Park Kyung-ni (Flyweight)
- Han Yong-un (Lightweight) - Bronze
