= Hans Niederhauser =

Swiss boxer

Personal information
- Nationality: Swiss
- Born: 15 February 1929

Sport
- Sport: Boxing

Hans Niederhauser (born 15 February 1929) is a Swiss boxer. He competed in the men's middleweight event at the 1952 Summer Olympics.
