= Václav Koutný =

Czech footballer (born 1991)

Personal information
- Full name: Václav Koutný
- Date of birth: 4 October 1991 (age 35)
- Place of birth: Olomouc, Czechoslovakia
- Height: 1.77 m (5 ft 10 in)
- Position: Centre back

Team information
- Current team: FC Gießen
- Number: 24

Youth career
- Sigma Olomouc

Senior career*
Years	Team	Apps	(Gls)
2009–2014	Sigma Olomouc	40	(0)
2012	→ Senica (loan)	10	(0)
2014	→ Karviná (loan)	88	(2)
2015–2018	Teutonia Watzenborn-Steinberg	34	(2)
2018–	FC Gießen	10	(0)
- * Club domestic league appearances and goals as of 13 May 2020

Václav Koutný (born 4 October 1991) is a Czech footballer who currently plays for FC Gießen.
