= Shinichiro Suzuki =

Japanese boxer

Personal information
- Nationality: Japanese
- Born: 21 November 1934 (age 90)

Sport
- Sport: Boxing

Shinichiro Suzuki (鈴木 信一朗, Suzuki Shin'ichirō; born 21 November 1934) is a Japanese boxer. He competed in the men's featherweight event at the 1956 Summer Olympics.
