= Chung Dong-hoon =

South Korean boxer (born 1932)

Personal information
- Born: 1932 (age 93–94) Jeollanam-do, South Korea
- Education: Chosun University

Korean name
- Hangul: 정동훈
- Hanja: 鄭東薰
- RR: Jeong Donghun
- MR: Chŏng Tonghun

Sport
- Sport: Boxing
Medal record
Chung Dong-hoon
Medal record
Men's Boxing
Representing South Korea
Asian Games
Gold medal – first place	Tokyo 1958	Lightweight

Chung Dong-hoon (born 1932) also spelled Chung Dong-hun, is a former amateur boxer from South Korea. A native of Jeollanam-do, he graduated from Chosun University in Gwangju. He competed in the lightweight division at South Korea's April 1955 domestic Olympic national delegation qualifying tournament, and was victorious over Park Young-mu (朴英茂). The following year, he went to Melbourne, Australia to represent South Korea at the 1956 Summer Olympics in boxing, where he lost to Ján Zachara of Czechoslovakia. He went on to compete for South Korea in boxing at the 1958 Asian Games in Tokyo, Japan, where he captured the gold medal in the boxing lightweight division of the games after defeating Shinichiro Suzuki from Japan in the final.
