= Vasile Tiță =

Romanian boxer (1928–2013)

Vasile Tiţă
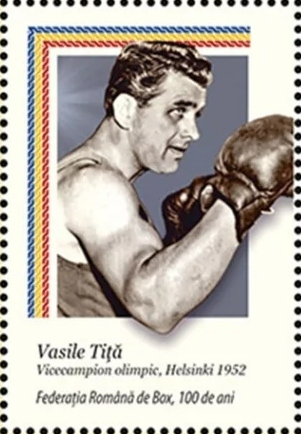

Personal information
- Nickname: Blue eyes
- Born: 21 February 1928 Bucharest, Kingdom of Romania
- Died: 24 June 2013 (aged 85) Bucharest, Romania

Sport
- Sport: Boxing
- Club: Steaua București
Medal record
Representing Romania
Romania National Amateur Boxing Championships
Silver medal – second place	1950 Bucharest	-67 kg
Gold medal – first place	1951 Bucharest	-71 kg
Gold medal – first place	1952 Bucharest	-71 kg
Gold medal – first place	1953 Galați, Brașov and Bucharest	-71 kg
Gold medal – first place	1954 Bucharest	-75 kg
Gold medal – first place	1955 Bucharest	-71 kg
Gold medal – first place	1956 Bucharest	-71 kg
Gold medal – first place	1957 Bucharest	-71 kg
Olympic Games
Silver medal – second place	1952 Helsinki	-75 kg

Vasile Tiţă (21 February 1928 – 24 June 2013) was a Romanian amateur middleweight boxer. He won a silver medal at his first major international tournament, the 1952 Olympics, losing in the final to Floyd Patterson. After that he competed at the 1953, 1955 and 1957 European championships with the best result of reaching the quarterfinals in 1955. Domestically he won seven consecutive national titles in 1951–57, six in the 71 kg and one in the 75 kg division. He died aged 85 after suffering from Alzheimer's disease for a decade.

== Olympic record ==
Vasile Tiţă competed in the 1952 Helsinki Olympic boxing tournament as a middleweight. He was a silver medalist. Here are his results:

- First Round: defeated William Bernard Tynan Duggan of Ireland by a third-round disqualification.
- Second Round: defeated Nelson de Paula Andrade of Brazil by a second-round disqualification.
- Quarterfinal: defeated Walter Sentimenti of Italy by a third-round TKO.
- Semifinal: defeated Boris Nikolov of Bulgaria on a unanimous decision.
- Final: Lost to Floyd Patterson of the United States by a first-round knockout.
