= Bernard Schröter =

German boxer

Personal information
- Nationality: German
- Born: 10 April 1934; Sandersdorf-Brehna, Germany
- Died: 22 October 2015 (aged 81); Halle (Saale), Germany

Sport
- Sport: Boxing

Bernard Schröter (10 April 1934 – 22 October 2015) was a German boxer. He competed in the men's featherweight event at the 1956 Summer Olympics.
