= Pentti Niinivuori =

Finnish boxer

Personal information
- Nationality: Finnish
- Born: 27 August 1931 Forssa, Finland
- Died: 5 July 1988 (aged 56) Forssa, Finland

Sport
- Sport: Boxing

Pentti Niinivuori (27 August 1931 – 5 July 1988) was a Finnish boxer. He competed at the 1952 Summer Olympics and the 1956 Summer Olympics. At the 1952 Summer Olympics, he lost to Sergio Caprari of Italy.
