= Gennady Garbuzov =

Russian boxer (1930–2009)

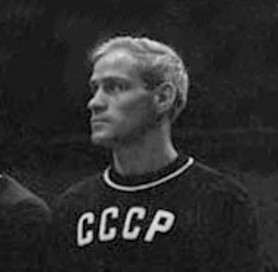
- Garbuzov at the 1952 Olympics

Personal information
- Born: 11 September 1930 Moscow, Russian SFSR, Soviet Union
- Died: 21 October 2009 (aged 79) Moscow, Russia

Sport
- Sport: Boxing
- Club: Dynamo Moscow
Medal record
Representing the Soviet Union
Olympic Games
| Bronze medal – third place | 1952 Helsinki | Bantamweight |

Gennady Varfolomeyevich Garbuzov (Russian: Геннадий Варфоломеевич Гарбузов, 11 September 1930 – 21 October 2009) was a Russian bantamweight boxer. He won a Soviet title in 1951 and an Olympic bronze medal in 1952.

== 1952 Olympic results ==
Below are the results of Gennady Garbuzov, a bantamweight boxer from the Soviet Union who competed at the 1952 Helsinki Olympics:

- Round of 32: defeated Jean Renard (Belgium) by decision, 2–1
- Round of 16: defeated Raúl Macías (Mexico) by decision, 3–0
- Quarterfinal: defeated Frantisek Majdlock (Czechoslovakia) by decision, 3–0
- Semifinal: lost to Pentti Hamalainen (Finland) by decision, 0–3 (was awarded bronze medal)
