= Janusz Kasperczak =

Polish boxer (1927–2002)

Personal information
- Nationality: Polish
- Born: 29 September 1927 Poznań, Poland
- Died: 16 April 2002 (aged 74) Wrocław, Poland

Sport
- Sport: Boxing
Medal record
Men's amateur boxing
Representing Poland
European Amateur Championships
Gold medal – first place	1949 Oslo	Flyweight

Janusz Kasperczak (29 September 1927 – 16 April 2002) was a Polish boxer. He competed in the men's flyweight event at the 1948 Summer Olympics.
