= Los Cajones =

Coordinates: 32°02′S 65°23′W

- Municipality and village
- Interactive map of Los Cajones
- Country: Argentina
- Province: San Luis Province
- Time zone: UTC−3 (ART)

Los Cajones is a village and municipality in San Luis Province in central Argentina.
