= Stoyan Stoyanov =

Bulgarian fighter ace

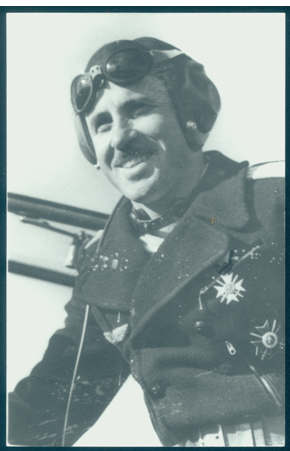
Major Stoyan Stoyanov after his last combat flight, 1944.

Stoyan Iliev Stoyanov (Bulgarian: Стоян Илиев Стоянов; 12 March 1913 – 13 March 1997) was the highest scoring Bulgarian fighter ace of the Royal Bulgarian Air Force in World War II with 15 victories.

== Early life ==
Stoyan Stoyanov was born 12 March 1913 in the village of Galata (now a part of the city of Varna). He was one of five siblings. Five months before his birth, his father, a flag bearer of the 8th Sea-Regiment of Varna in the Balkan war, was killed in a battle against the Ottoman Army near the town of Edirne, near Istanbul. Because of his father's death, he was accepted in a school for war-orphans in Varna. He sold newspapers in the streets of Varna. He continued his secondary education in the national Seminary (in Sofia), which he entered in 1930.

== Military schools and training ==
In 1934 he was granted a scholarship to the higher army school for army officers in Sofia. He passed the examinations with an excellent score and became a cavalry officer. He then attended the Royal Military Academy in Sofia in late 1934 taking the aviator's course. In 1938 he graduated and was promoted to the rank of Lieutenant.

Stoyanov was then sent for training abroad in Germany. In July–September 1938, he took part in a competition course for acrobatic flying in Kaufbeuren. He finished this course 15 days before his fellow Bulgarian students and in September 1938 began a second course in the Higher school for fighter pilots at Werneuchen (near Berlin), with six of his Bulgarian colleagues. In 1939 he graduated and in Germany, trained his colleagues Ch. Toplodolsky and D. Spissarevsky (who both became high scoring aces). Stoyanov was trained to fly a variety of planes, among which was Gothaer, Bücker Bü 181 Bestman, Focke-Wulf Fw 44 Stieglitz, Arado Ar 45, Ar 68, Heinkel He 51, Focke-Wulf Fw 56 Stösser, Messerschmitt Bf 109 D, Bf 109 E, Bf 109 (G2 and G6) and others.

In 1939 Stoyanov became an instructor in the fighter pilot's school at Karlovo airfield, training pilots to fly Bf 109s recently delivered to the Bulgarian Air Force. In 1939 he met Mina, an 18-year-old girl who lived in Karlovo and they married in August 1940. In mid 1943 he was appointed commander of 682 (Jato) Sq./6th Fighter Regiment based at Karlovo and equipped with the Bf 109 G-2 and G-6.

== World war II career and awards ==
Stoyanov claimed his initial victory on 1 August 1943 during Operation Tidal Wave. He was personally decorated by the Bulgarian King Boris III with the "Commander’s medal for bravery". He also received the Iron Cross 2nd Class from the German Embassy. A second medal for bravery was awarded on 24 June 1944.

His last aerial victory was on 26 August 1944. In September 1944 he was promoted to captain. The same month Bulgaria joined the Allies and thereafter the air operations were against the retreating Axis forces.

On 22 November 1944 he received his third medal for bravery and was promoted to Major, this time for combat against German ground forces in Macedonia and Kosovo (Bulgaria had joined the Allies after a political change of government on 9 September 1944.)

Stoyanov is also referenced as being credited with 4 individual destroyed, 1 shared destroyed and 4 damaged ( Philippe Saintes,: 'Stoyan Stoyanov, le Comte du Bf 109' Avions, Issue 124, June 2003) or 4 individual destroyed, 2 shared destroyed and 3 damaged.

== After the war ==
Stoyanov remained in the Air Force of PR Bulgaria for a couple of years. In March 1945 Bulgaria received 120 Russian Yak-9M fighter planes and he trained many new pilots to fly them. He was dismissed in 1956 with a low military pension. He worked for 30 years as a guide in the Rila Monastery, a national museum and tourist site in the Rila Mountains, while his family lived in Sofia.

== After the fall of the communist regime ==
As late as after 1989 Stoyanov was honoured as No 1 ace of the Bulgarian Royal Air Force in World War II. In 1992 he was raised to the honorary rank of general-major (retired). He died five years later, on March 13, 1997.
