= Los Molles, San Luis =

Coordinates: 32°27′S 65°01′W

Los Molles
- Municipality and village
- Interactive map of Los Molles
- Country: Argentina
- Province: San Luis Province
- Time zone: UTC−3 (ART)

Los Molles is a village and municipality in San Luis Province in central Argentina.
