= Ángel Leyes =

Argentine boxer

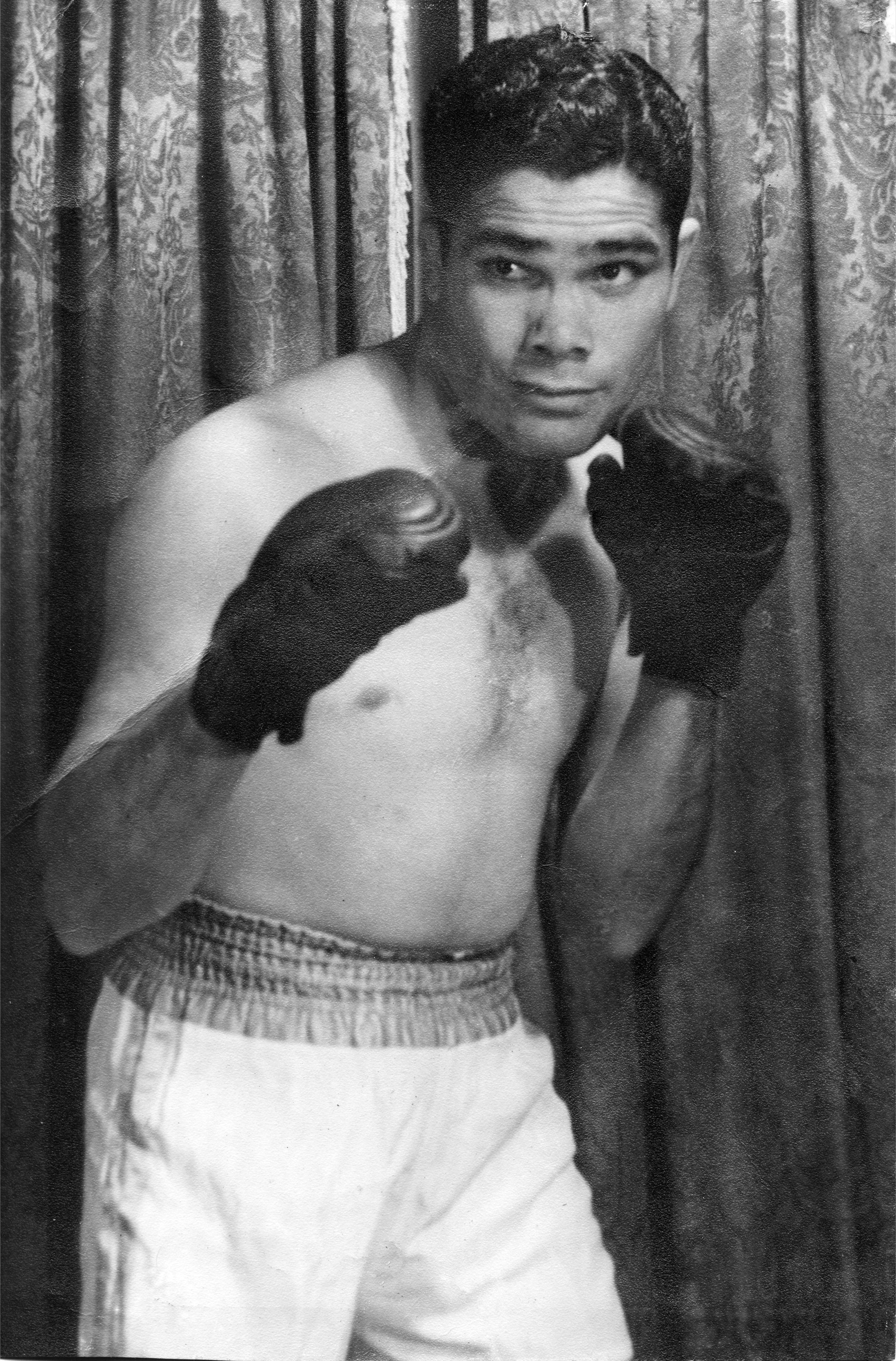

Personal information
- Nickname: Payuca
- Nationality: Argentina
- Born: Ángel Leonides Leyes; 22 April 1930 Talita, San Luis Province
- Died: June 24, 1996 (aged 66) Buenos Aires
- Weight: Featherweight

Boxing career
- Stance: Orthodox

Boxing record
- Total fights: 91
- Wins: 59
- Win by KO: 30
- Losses: 23
- Draws: 9
- No contests: 0

Ángel Leonides Leyes (22 April 1930, in Talita, San Luis Province – 24 June 1996, in Buenos Aires) was an Argentine boxer who was Latin American featherweight champion in 1948 and 1952. He also wins Argentine featherweight championship in 1948, 1949 and two times in 1952. He participated in the 1952 Summer Olympics in Helsinki, Finland.

He was one of the most popular Argentine boxers in the early fifties in Argentina.
