= Lafinur =

Coordinates: 32°04′S 65°20′W

- Municipality and village
- Interactive map of Lafinur
- Country: Argentina
- Province: San Luis Province

Population (2010)
  - Total: 201

Lafinur is a village and municipality in San Luis Province in central Argentina.
