= Pedro Galasso =

Brazilian boxer

Personal information
- Born: 19 January 1930 São Paulo, Brazil
- Died: 25 August 2007 (aged 77)

Sport
- Sport: Boxing

Pedro Galasso (19 January 1930 – 25 August 2007) was a Brazilian boxer. He competed in the men's featherweight event at the 1952 Summer Olympics.
