= Vincenzo Dall'Osso =

Italian boxer

Personal information
- Nationality: Italian
- Born: 22 February 1929; Imola, Italy
- Died: 6 September 2015 (aged 86)

Sport
- Sport: Boxing

Vincenzo Dall'Osso (22 February 1929 – 6 September 2015) was an Italian boxer. He competed in the men's bantamweight event at the 1952 Summer Olympics. In 1951 he won the European Amateur Boxing Championships in Milan.
