= Antoine Martin (writer) =

French writer (1955–2021)

- Born: 1955; Province of Alicante, Spain
- Died: 5 April 2021 (aged 66)
- Occupation: Writer

Antoine Martin (1955 – 5 April 2021) was a Spanish-born French writer.

== Biography ==
Martin was born in 1955 in the Province of Alicante. He began his career as a translator and artist. The author of multiple articles, he also translated works from Spanish into French, such as those by Camilo José Cela, Manuel Chaves Nogales, and Juan Miguel Aguilera. He presented texts on theatre and modeling at the Centre international de poésie Marseille. In 2008, he wrote La Cape de Mandrake, a collection of short stories. His style has led to comparisons to Gaston Chaissac and Frédéric Valabrègue.

Antoine Martin died on 5 April 2021 at the age of 66.

== Awards ==
- Prix international Hemingway (2009)

== Works ==
- Le Sapeur Pompée et la grande échelle Maryse (1992)
- Rue Pergolese (1992)
- Gloria (1994)
- Histoire de l'humanité : fragments (1997)
- El niño (1998)
- Figurines (2000)
- La Sentinelle du fleuve Niger (2006)
- La Cape de Mandrake : et autres nouvelles (2008)
- Le chauffe-eau : épopée (2012)
- Produits carnés : et autres nouvelles (2014)
- Juin de culasse : odyssée (2014)
- Conquistadores : sitcom (2015)
