= Joseph Ventaja =

French boxer

Medal record

Men's Boxing

Representing France

Olympic Games
Bronze medal – third place	1952 Helsinki	Featherweight

European Amateur Championships
Gold medal – first place	1951 Milan	Featherweight

Joseph Ventaja (4 February 1930 – 11 August 2003) was a French boxer who won the bronze medal in the featherweight division at the 1952 Summer Olympics in Helsinki. He was born in Casablanca, Morocco.

== 1952 Olympic results ==
Below are the results of Joseph Ventaja who competed for France as a featherweight at the 1952 Olympic boxing tournament in Helsinki:

- Round of 32: defeated Yuri Sokolov (Soviet Union) on points, 2-1
- Round of 16: defeated Sydney Greave (Pakistan) on points, 3-0
- Quarterfinal: defeated Edson Brown (United States) on points, 3-0
- Semifinal: lost to Sergio Caprari (Italy) on points, 1-2 (was awarded bronze medal)

== Pro career ==
Ventaja began his career as a professional in 1956 and won his first 11 fights. He retired in 1958 after a loss to Epiphane Akono.
