= Börje Grönroos =

Finnish boxer (1929–2015)

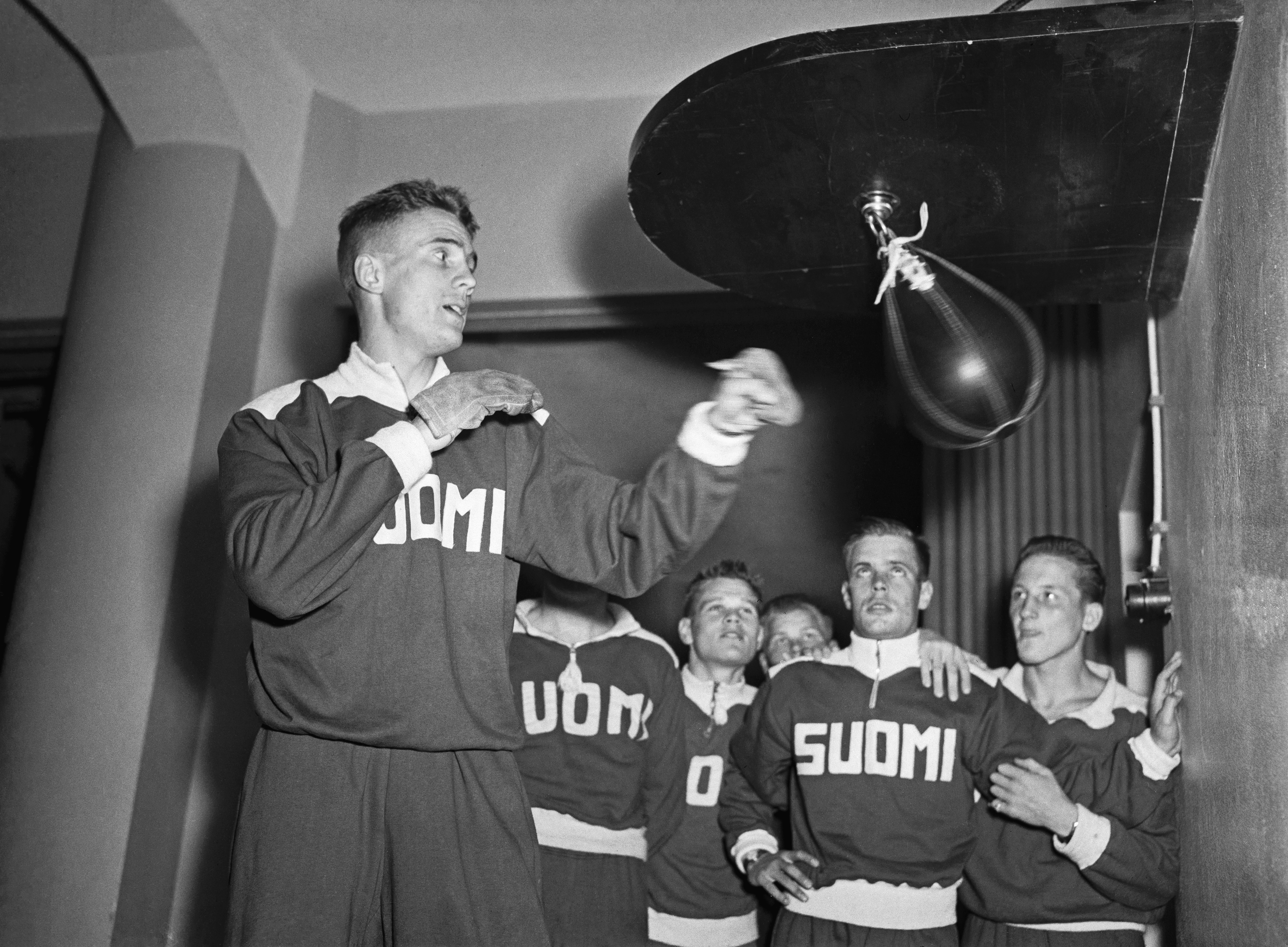
- Helsinki Summer Olympics 1952. The Finnish boxers exercise in Salmisaari in Helsinki 17.7.1952. Pentti Niinivuori and Erkki Mallenius amongst others are watching while Börje Grönroos is boxing.

Personal information
- Nationality: Finnish
- Born: 13 January 1929 Helsinki, Finland
- Died: 17 December 2015 (aged 86)

Sport
- Sport: Boxing

Börje Grönroos (13 January 1929 – 17 December 2015) was a Finnish boxer. He competed in the men's middleweight event at the 1952 Summer Olympics.
