= Georgi Eftimov =

Bulgarian footballer

Personal information
- Date of birth: 24 March 1931
- Date of death: 14 May 1990 (aged 59)
- Position: Defender

International career
Years	Team	Apps	(Gls)
- Bulgaria

Georgi Eftimov (24 March 1931 – 14 May 1990) was a Bulgarian footballer. He competed in the men's tournament at the 1952 Summer Olympics.
