= Talita =

Coordinates: 32°14′S 65°35′W

- Municipality and village
- Interactive map of Talita
- Country: Argentina
- Province: San Luis Province
- Time zone: UTC−3 (ART)

Talita is a village and municipality in San Luis Province in central Argentina.
