= Carpintería, San Luis =

Coordinates: 32°24′S 65°01′W

Carpintería (San Luis)
- Municipality and village
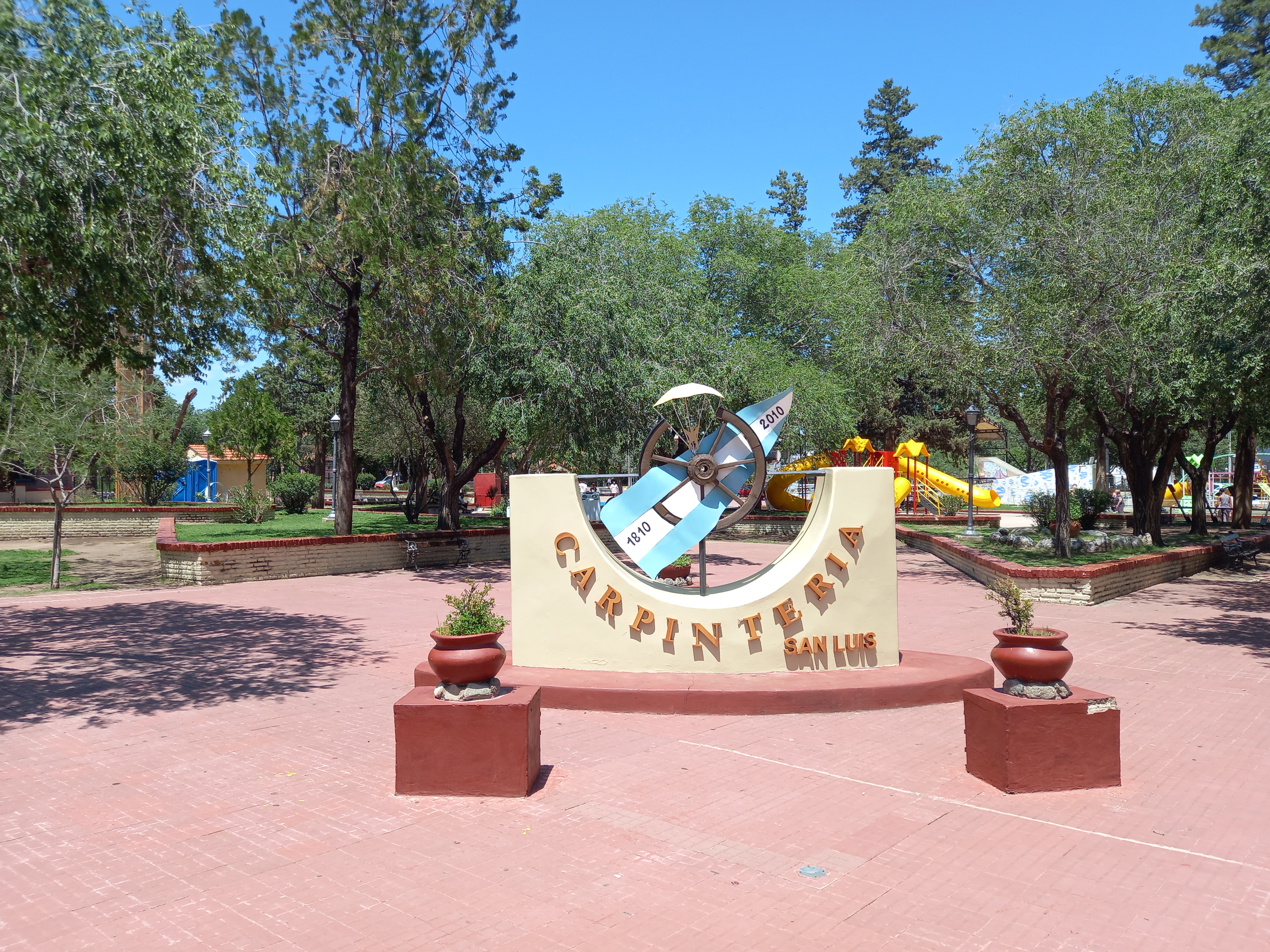
- Plaza in Carpintería
- Interactive map of Carpintería (San Luis)
- Country: Argentina
- Province: San Luis Province
- Time zone: UTC−3 (ART)

Carpintería (San Luis) is a village and municipality in San Luis Province in central Argentina.
