= Henryk Niedźwiedzki =

Polish boxer (1933–2018)

Medal record

Men's Boxing

Representing Poland

Olympic Games
Bronze medal – third place	1956 Melbourne	Featherweight

Henryk Władysław Niedźwiedzki (6 April 1933 – 9 February 2018) was an Olympic boxer from Poland.

Niedźwiedzki was born in Bäreneiche, then Germany, now in Poland. He competed for Poland in the 1956 Summer Olympic Games held in Melbourne, Australia in the featherweight event where, as a losing semifinalist, he was a bronze medallist. Niedźwiedzki died after a protracted illness at the age of 84.

== 1956 Olympic results ==
Below are Henryk Niedźwiedzki's results from the 1956 Olympics in Melbourne, Australia where he competed as a featherweight boxer for Poland.

- Round of 32: bye
- Round of 16: defeated Leonard Leisching (South Africa) on points
- Quarterfinal: defeated Tristan Falfan (Argentina) by a first-round knockout
- Semifinal: lost to Vladimir Safronov (Soviet Union) on points (was awarded bronze medal)
