= Raúl Macías =

Mexican boxer (1934–2009)

Personal information
- Nickname: Ratón Macías
- Born: Raúl Macías Guevara; July 28, 1934 Mexico City, Mexico
- Died: March 23, 2009 (aged 74) Mexico City, Mexico
- Height: 1.61 m (5 ft 3 1/2 in)
- Weight: Bantamweight

Boxing career
- Reach: 1.61 m (63 in)
- Stance: Orthodox

Boxing record
- Total fights: 43
- Wins: 41
- Win by KO: 25
- Losses: 2
Medal record
Representing Mexico
Pan American Games
Bronze medal – third place	1951 Buenos Aires	Flyweight

Raúl Macías Guevara (July 28, 1934, in Mexico City – March 23, 2009) was a Mexican professional boxer, actor and boxing trainer. He took the NBA World Bantamweight Championship on March 9, 1955. Widely known as "Ratón" Macías, or "Mouse" Macías, he won a bronze medal at the 1951 Pan American Games.

== Early life and amateur career ==
Macias was born on July 28, 1934, in Tepito, Distrito Federal, Mexico, a suburb of Mexico City. Macías had always expressed pride at being Mexican.

Macias began his amateur career at age fourteen, winning the National Junior Flyweight, Flyweight and Bantamweight titles. He won a bronze medal at the Pan American Games, and represented Mexico as a bantamweight at the 1952 Helsinki Olympic Games. In the Olympics, he first defeated Angel Amaya of Venezuela in a unanimous decision, then lost to Gennady Garbuzov of the Soviet Union

== 1952 Olympic results ==
Below is the record of Raul Macias, a Mexican bantamweight boxer who competed at the 1952 Helsinki Olympics:

- Round of 32: defeated Angel Amaya (Venezuela) by decision, 3-0
- Round of 16: lost to Gennady Garbuzov (Soviet Union) by decision, 0-3

== Professional career ==
On January 1, 1953, Macias debuted as a professional boxer with a first round knockout win against Memo Sanchez in Culiacán, Sinaloa, Mexico. Exactly one month later and in only his second fight, Macias had his first ten-round bout, and he outpointed Chucho Tello in Culiacán, a feat he would duplicate in their rematch.

Macias piled up a record of 8–0 with 2 knockouts and then faced Beto Couray on October 17, 1953, in Mexico City, for the Mexican Bantamweight title, lifting the national championship from Couray with a 12-round decision win. After 6 more wins, he challenged Nate Brooks on September 26, 1954, for the continental, NABF Bantamweight championship, which he took with a twelve-round decision in Mexico City.

Macías was one of Televisa's first boxing stars. Many of his fights were shown live on Televisa during the 1950s.

=== Taking the NBA world bantamweight title, 1955 ===
National Boxing Association World Bantamweight champion Robert Cohen refused to defend his title against Macías, so the NBA decided to declare the title vacant and have Macias and Chamroen Songkitrat fight for the championship. It was Macías' first attempt at the world title and first fight abroad. On March 9, 1955, in San Francisco, California, Macías knocked out Songkiktrat in round eleven, taking the NBA World Bantamweight championship. Macias demonstrated great speed, boxing skill, and a powerful punch in his victory. Macias floored Songkitrat twice in the sixth. From the sixth on, Macias dominated the bout. Songkitrat down for an eight count from a right in the eleventh. After he was down again from a right to the head, referee Fred Apostoli, a former world champion, ended the bout thirty seconds into round eleven.

Next followed a series of non-title fights. In a non-title bout on June 16, 1955, Macías suffered his first defeat when he was knocked out 2:29 into the third round by Billy Peacock in Los Angeles. The final blows were two left hooks that left Macias with a broken jaw. Macias, originally a 3-1 favorite, was down for a no count from a blow to his jaw earlier in the round. The bout would be Macías' only defeat by knockout, and left him hospitalized for two days.

Macías' popularity followed him to California and Texas, where he fought a number of times. On October 17, 1955, he defefated Cecil Schoonmaker in a ten-round decision in Corpus Christi, Texas. The non-title bout was considered drab by several ringsiders.

=== NBA bantamweight title defenses, and losing title ===
Macias had five victories before he defended his NBA world Bantamweight title for the first time against Leo Espinoza. He defeated Espinoza, father of Philippines world boxing champion Luisito Espinoza, before a crowd of 50,000 in a tenth-round knockout on March 25, 1956, in Mexico City. A blow to the ribs and a right to the head put Espinoza down for the full count 2:57 into the tenth round. Espinoza complained that the altitude of Mexico City robbed him of his full breathing capacity.

Top rated Italian bantamweight Gaetano Annaloro fell to Macias on November 21, 1956, in a decisive ten-round decision in San Antonio, Texas. The crowd of 4,500 shouted for more action in the carefully fought non-title bout. Macias used his left effectively, and though he sustained a slightly bruised hand in the fourth, it did not hinder him in the remaining rounds. Annaloro bobbed and weaved to maintain his defense, but was unable to gain an advantage over his opponent.

On February 10, 1957, Macias knocked out Juan Carcenas in Mexico City in the sixth round. In their non-title bout, Macias put Carcenas to the mat ten times before he was counted out 1:30 into the sixth round. Cardenas was down four times in the second, three in the third, once in the fifth and twice in the sixth.

After seven more non-title fight wins, Macias faced Dommy Ursua on June 15, 1957, in San Francisco in his second title defense. Macias was down for a four count from a left hook in the first, but retained his championship, knocking out Ursua in the eleventh before a crowd of 13,000. Macias took the lead after the third round, and used his five-inch height advantage to score with telling body blows. A cut above Ursua's eye slowed his progress after the sixth. Macias was called for a low blow in the eleventh, not long before unleashing a right and two handed combination that led to the referee ending the match.

On November 6, 1957, he faced Alphonse Halimi at Los Angeles' Wrigley Field in his last title bout. Halimi shook Macias with a hook to the jaw in the furious fourth round, though the bout featured no knockdowns. Macias lost his belt by a close and controversial 15-round split decision. Macias tried to close stronger in the final round, but was stopped by Halimi's offense.

== Life after boxing ==
He retired from boxing in 1959 after outpointing Ernesto Parra in ten rounds in Mexico City. After a three-year break, he knocked out Chocolate Zambrano in the fifth as part of a charity event on October 13, 1962, in Guadalajara. The match was his last.

In retirement, Macías appeared in a number of Mexican telenovelas, most notably 1990's "Mi Pequeña Soledad" ("My Small Soledad"), alongside Verónica Castro. His best known movies included El Raton in 1957, La Culpa in 1966, and Llanto, risas e nocaut in 1974. The black and white film El Raton, in which he starred, was directed by Chano Urueta. He co-starred with gifted boxer, four times world champion and Boxing Hall of Fame member, Ruben Olivares, ("el puas"), in Llanto, risas e nocaut.

After his participation in "Mi Pequeña Soledad", Macías dedicated himself to training boxers in a Mexico City gym. He compiled a professional boxing record of 41 wins and 2 losses, with 25 wins by knockout. He died at the age of 74.

== Professional record ==
41 Wins (25 knockouts, 16 decisions), 2 Losses, 0 Draws
Res.	Record	Opponent	Type	Round	Date	Location	Notes
Win	41–2	(Mexico) Chocolate Zambrano	TKO	5 (8)	1962-10-13	Guadalajara, Jalisco, Mexico	
Win	40–2	(Mexico) Ernesto Parra	UD	10	1959-02-28	Mexico City, Distrito Federal, Mexico	
Win	39–2	(United States) Carmen Iacobucci	KO	2 (10)	1959-02-08	Mexicali, Baja California, Mexico	
Win	38–2	(Mexico) Luis Trejo	KO	8 (10)	1959-01-25	Ensenada, Baja California, Mexico	
Win	37–2	(Mexico) Kid Irapuato	UD	10	1958-11-10	Tijuana, Baja California, Mexico	
Loss	36–2	(France) Alphonse Halimi	SD	15	1957-11-06	Wrigley Field, Los Angeles, California, United States	Lost NBA bantamweight title
Win	36–1	(Mexico) Pastor Gonzalez	KO	5 (10)	1957-09-07	Ciudad Juarez, Chihuahua, Mexico	
Win	35–1	(Philippines) Dommy Ursua	TKO	11 (15)	1957-06-15	Cow Palace, Daly City, California, United States	Retained NBA bantamweight title
Win	34–1	(Spain) Juan Cardenas	KO	6 (10)	1957-02-10	Arena Mexico, Mexico City, Distrito Federal, Mexico	
Win	33–1	(Tunisia) Gaetano Annaloro	UD	10	1956-11-21	San Antonio, Texas, United States	
Win	32–1	(United States) Johnny Hand	KO	1 (10)	1956-11-13	El Paso, Texas, United States	
Win	31–1	(Mexico) Ramon Young	KO	2 (10)	1956-11-03	Ciudad Obregon, Sonora, Mexico	
Win	30–1	(Mexico) Hector Ceballos	KO	4 (10)	1956-10-27	Hermosillo, Sonora, Mexico	
Win	29–1	(Philippines) Larry Bataan	KO	6 (10)	1956-09-05	Olympic Auditorium, Los Angeles, California, United States	
Win	28–1	(Philippines) Tanny Campo	UD	10	1956-06-30	Arena Mexico, Mexico City, Distrito Federal, Mexico	
Win	27–1	(Mexico) Adrian Kiriz	KO	3 (10)	1956-05-26	Monterrey, Nuevo León, Mexico	
Win	26–1	(Mexico) Mike Hernandez	KO	4 (10)	1956-04-21	Merida, Yucatán, Mexico	
Win	25–1	(Philippines) Leo Espinosa	KO	10 (15)	1956-03-25	Plaza Mexico, Mexico City, Distrito Federal, Mexico	Retained NBA bantamweight title
Win	24–1	(Mexico) Joe Chamaco	KO	4 (10)	1956-01-29	Irapuato, Guanajuato, Mexico	
Win	23–1	(Mexico) Lucio Torres	KO	6 (10)	1956-01-15	Veracruz, Veracruz, Mexico	
Win	22–1	(Mexico) Arturo Ruiz	TKO	6 (10)	1955-12-11	Acapulco, Guerrero, Mexico	
Win	21–1	(Mexico) Pedro Soto	KO	6 (10)	1955-11-21	Orizaba, Veracruz, Mexico	
Win	20–1	(United States) Cecil Schoonmaker	UD	10	1955-10-17	Memorial Auditorium, Corpus Christi, Texas, United States	
Loss	19–1	(United States) Billy Peacock	TKO	3 (10)	1955-06-15	Olympic Auditorium, Los Angeles, California, United States	
Win	19–0	(United States) Moe Mario	TKO	5 (10)	1955-05-12	San Antonio, Texas, United States	
Win	18–0	(Mexico) Memo Sanchez	KO	6 (10)	1955-04-10	Mexicali, Baja California, Mexico	
Win	17–0	(Thailand) Chamroen Songkitrat	TKO	11 (12)	1955-03-09	Cow Palace, Daly City, California, United States	Won vacant NBA bantamweight title
Win	16–0	(United States) Nate Brooks	UD	12	1954-09-26	Plaza Mexico, Mexico City, Distrito Federal, Mexico	Won North American bantamweight title
Win	15–0	(Mexico) Fili Nava	UD	12	1954-05-22	Arena Mexico, Mexico City, Distrito Federal, Mexico	Retained Mexico bantamweight title
Win	14–0	(Mexico) Fili Nava	UD	12	1954-04-10	Arena Mexico, Mexico City, Distrito Federal, Mexico	Retained Mexico bantamweight title
Win	13–0	(United States) Billy Peacock	TKO	7 (10)	1954-03-13	Arena Mexico, Mexico City, Distrito Federal, Mexico	
Win	12–0	(Chile) Alberto Reyes	UD	10	1954-01-16	Arena Mexico, Mexico City, Distrito Federal, Mexico	
Win	11–0	(United States) Lalo Gayosso	TKO	3 (10)	1953-12-23	Mexico City, Distrito Federal, Mexico	
Win	10–0	(Chile) Alberto Reyes	TKO	3 (10)	1953-11-21	Arena Mexico, Mexico City, Distrito Federal, Mexico	
Win	9–0	(Mexico) Beto Couary	UD	12	1953-10-17	Arena Mexico, Mexico City, Distrito Federal, Mexico	Won Mexico bantamweight title
Win	8–0	(Mexico) Genaro Serafin	UD	10	1953-09-12	Mexico City, Distrito Federal, Mexico	
Win	7–0	(Mexico) Otilio Galvan	UD	12	1953-08-01	Mexico City, Distrito Federal, Mexico	
Win	6–0	(Mexico) Trini Ruiz	UD	10	1953-05-13	Mexico City, Distrito Federal, Mexico	
Win	5–0	(Cuba) Manuel Armenteros	UD	10	1953-04-15	Mexico City, Distrito Federal, Mexico	
Win	4–0	(Mexico) Giraldo Bacho	KO	4 (10)	1953-03-26	Puebla, Puebla, Mexico	
Win	3–0	(Mexico) Memo Sanchez	TKO	5 (10)	1952-12-15	Culiacan, Sinaloa, Mexico	
Win	2–0	(Mexico) Chucho Tello	UD	10	1952-11-22	Culiacan, Sinaloa, Mexico	
Win	1–0	(Mexico) Chucho Tello	UD	10	1952-11-01	Culiacan, Sinaloa, Mexico	professional debut.

== See also ==
- List of world bantamweight boxing champions
- List of Mexican boxing world champions
