= Leen Jansen =

Dutch boxer

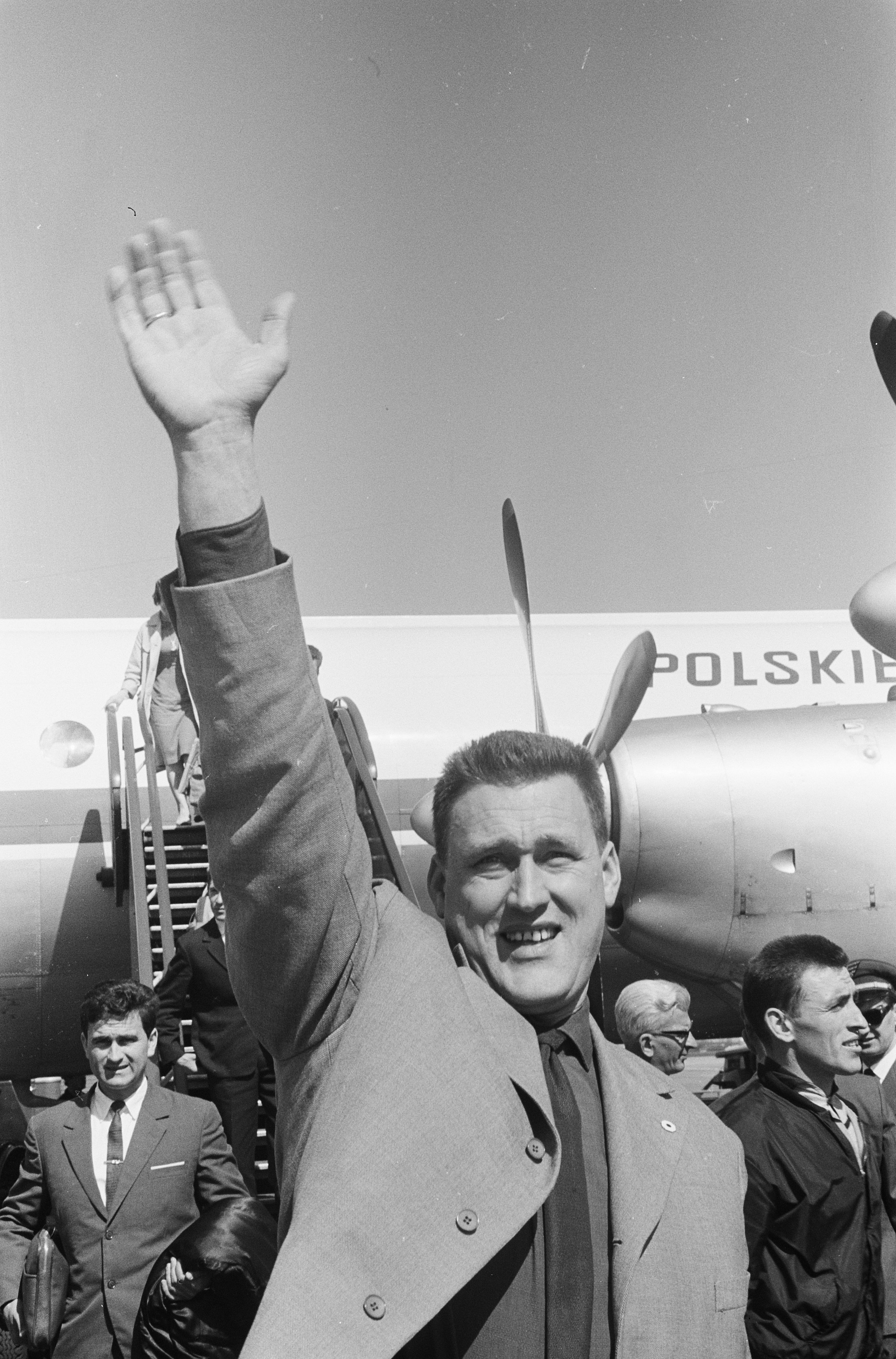
- Jansen in 1962

Personal information
- Born: 3 August 1930 Rotterdam, the Netherlands
- Died: 27 January 2014 (aged 83) Bergen op Zoom, the Netherlands

Sport
- Sport: Boxing
- Club: Huizenaar, Rotterdam

Leonardus ("Leen") Eustachius Jansen (3 August 1930 – 27 January 2014) was a boxer from the Netherlands, who competed for his native country at the 1952 Summer Olympics in Helsinki, Finland. There he was stopped in the quarterfinals of the men's Middleweight (−75 kg) division by eventual winner Floyd Patterson of the United States.

== 1952 Olympic results ==
Below are the results of Leen Jansen of the Netherlands who competed as a middleweight at the 1952 Olympic boxing tournament in Helsinki:

- Round of 32: bye
- Round of 16: defeated Robert Malouf (Canada) by technical knockout in the first round
- Quarterfinal: lost to Floyd Patterson (United States) by knockout in the first round

After the Summer Olympics Jansen became a professional. He boxed a total 71 matches, of which he won 60 (27 KOs). His last fight was on 2 October 1967 in his home town of Rotterdam, where he was defeated on points by Johnny Halafihi of Tonga.

Since 1980 he lived in Sint-Maartensdijk with his daughter and dog. There he taught boxing through his 80s. On 27 January 2014, Jansen died in the hospital of Bergen op Zoom at the age of 83.
