= Leonard Leisching =

South African boxer (1934–2018)

Medal record

Men's Boxing

Representing South Africa

Olympic Games
| Bronze medal – third place | 1952 Helsinki | Featherweight |

Commonwealth Games
| Gold medal – first place | 1954 Vancouver | Featherweight |

Leonard Leisching (11 September 1934 – 25 February 2018) was a boxer from South Africa, bronze medalist at the 1952 Summer Olympics in Helsinki and gold medalist at the 1954 British Empire and Commonwealth Games in Vancouver, British Columbia. Leisching was also an accomplished footballer, appearing as a full-back for Johannesburg Rangers, Wigan Athletic, Llandudno and Southern Suburbs.

== 1952 Olympic boxing tournament results ==
- Round of 32: defeated Emmanuel Agassi (Iran) 3-0;
- Round of 16: defeated Stevan Redli (Yugoslavia) 3-0;
- Quarterfinal: defeated Leonard Walters (Canada) 3-0;
- Semifinal: lost to Jan Zachara (Czechoslovakia) 2-1.

Starting at the 1952 Olympic boxing tournament, both losing semifinalists in all divisions received bronze medals. Leisching's first-round opponent, Emmanuel Agassi, is the father of tennis champion Andre Agassi.
