= Georgi Malezanov =

Bulgarian boxer

Georgi Malezanov (Bulgarian: Георги Малезанов; born 15 June 1927) is a Bulgarian former boxer who competed in the 1952 Summer Olympics.
