= Antoine Martin (boxer) =

French boxer

Personal information
- Nationality: French
- Born: 19 April 1933 Paris, France
- Died: 12 December 1987 (aged 54) Beuzeville, France

Sport
- Sport: Boxing

Antoine Martin (19 April 1933 – 12 December 1987) was a French boxer. He competed in the men's bantamweight event at the 1952 Summer Olympics.
