= Pentti Hämäläinen =

Finnish boxer (1929–1984)

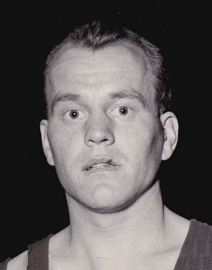

Personal information
- Born: Pentti Olavi Hämäläinen; 19 December 1929 Kotka, Finland
- Died: 11 December 1984 (aged 54) Kotka, Finland
- Height: 165 cm (5 ft 5 in)
- Weight: 51–58 kg (112–128 lb)

Sport
- Sport: Boxing
- Club: Kotkan Voimailijat
Medal record
Representing Finland
Olympic Games
Gold medal – first place	1952 Helsinki	-54 kg
Bronze medal – third place	1956 Melbourne	-57 kg
European Championships
Bronze medal – third place	1951 Milan	-51 kg
Bronze medal – third place	1955 Berlin	-57 kg

Pentti Olavi Hämäläinen (19 December 1929 – 11 December 1984) was a Finnish boxer. He competed at the 1952 and 1956 Olympics and won a gold and a bronze medal, respectively. He won two more bronze medals at European championships in 1951 and 1955. Domestically he won six Finnish titles between 1951 and 1956, two in flyweight, two in bantamweight and two in featherweight division. After the 1956 Olympics he turned professional and won five consecutive bouts. He lost his sixth bout in 1959 and retired from boxing, after which he worked as a mechanic and a policeman. Four of his brothers also competed in boxing at the national level. Pentti Hämäläinen died in 1984, aged 54, of undisclosed causes.

== 1952 Olympic record ==
Below is the record of Pentti Hämäläinen, a Finnish bantamweight boxer who competed at the 1952 Olympics in Helsinki:

- Round of 32: defeated Thomas Nicholls (Great Britain) by decision, 3–0
- Round of 16: defeated Henryk Niedzwiedzki (Poland) by decision, 3–0
- Quarterfinal: defeated Helmuth von Gravenitz (South Africa) by decision, 3–0
- Semifinal: defeated Gennady Garbuzov (Soviet Union) by decision, 3–0
- Final: defeated John McNally (Ireland) by decision, 2-1 (won gold medal)

== 1956 Olympic record ==
Below is the record of Pentti Hämäläinen, a Finnish featherweight boxer who competed at the 1956 Olympics in Melbourne:

- Round of 32: defeated Martin Smyth (Ireland) on points
- Round of 16: defeated Bernard Schroter (East Germany) on points
- Quarterfinal: defeated Jan Zachara (Czechoslovakia) on points
- Semifinal: lost to Thomas Nicholls (Great Britain) on points (was awarded bronze medal)
