= Åke Wärnström =

Swedish boxer (1925–2018)

Åke Wärnström (29 December 1925 – 6 June 2018) was a Swedish boxer who competed in the 1952 Summer Olympics. Wärnström died in June 2018 at the age of 92.
