= János Erdei =

Hungarian boxer

Personal information
- Nationality: Hungarian
- Born: 2 November 1919; Makó, Hungary
- Died: 10 January 1997 (aged 77); Óföldeák, Hungary

Sport
- Sport: Boxing

János Erdei (2 November 1919 – 10 January 1997) was a Hungarian boxer. He competed in the men's featherweight event at the 1952 Summer Olympics.
