= Boris Nikolov (boxer) =

Bulgarian boxer (1929–2017)

Personal information
- Full name: Boris Georgiev Nikolov
- Born: 10 March 1929 Bazargic, Romania (today Dobrich, Bulgaria)
- Died: 29 January 2017 (aged 87) Sofia, Bulgaria
Medal record
Men's Boxing
Representing Bulgaria
Olympic Games
Bronze medal – third place	1952 Helsinki	Middleweight

Boris Georgiev Nikolov (Bulgarian: Борис Георгиев Николов; 10 March 1929 – 29 January 2017) was a Bulgarian boxer from Dobrich.

Nikolov was the first Bulgarian ever to win a medal at the Olympics. He competed for Bulgaria in boxing in the 1952 Summer Olympics held in Helsinki, Finland in the middleweight event where he finished in third place and took a Bronze medal. He also competed at the 1956 Olympics as a light middleweight but did not win a medal.

In 2010 he was awarded the Stara Planina Order 1st class.

== 1956 Olympic results ==
Below is the record of Boris Nikolov, a Bulgarian light middleweight boxer who competed at the 1956 Melbourne Olympics:

- Round of 16: defeated Muhammad Saftar (Pakistan) on points
- Quarterfinal: lost to Zbigniew Pietrzykowski (Poland) on points
