= United States at the 1952 Summer Olympics =

- Flag of the United States
- IOC code: USA
- NOC: United States Olympic Committee

in Helsinki, Finland July 19–August 3, 1952
- Competitors: 286 (245 men and 41 women) in 18 sports
- Flag bearer: Norman C. Armitage
- Medals Ranked 1st: Gold 40 Silver 19 Bronze 17 Total 76

Summer Olympics appearances (overview)
- 1896; 1900; 1904; 1908; 1912; 1920; 1924; 1928; 1932; 1936; 1948; 1952; 1956; 1960; 1964; 1968; 1972; 1976; 1980; 1984; 1988; 1992; 1996; 2000; 2004; 2008; 2012; 2016; 2020; 2024

Other related appearances
- 1906 Intercalated Games

The United States competed at the 1952 Summer Olympics in Helsinki, Finland. 286 competitors – 245 men and 41 women – took part in 133 events in 18 sports. They won 76 medals (40 gold), including 6 podium sweeps; the highest number of medal sweeps in a single Olympiad by one country since World War II and still a record (though achieved a few more times since).

== Medalists ==
Medal	Name	Sport	Event	Date
Gold	Walt Davis	Athletics	Men's high jump	July 20
Gold	Lindy Remigino	Athletics	Men's 100 m	July 21
Gold	Charles Moore	Athletics	Men's 400 m hurdles	July 21
Gold	Jerome Biffle	Athletics	Men's long jump	July 21
Gold	Parry O'Brien	Athletics	Men's shot put	July 21
Gold	Mal Whitfield	Athletics	Men's 800 m	July 22
Gold	Bob Richards	Athletics	Men's pole vault	July 22
Gold	Sim Iness	Athletics	Men's discus throw	July 22
Gold	Andy Stanfield	Athletics	Men's 200 m	July 23
Gold	Charlie Logg; Tom Price	Rowing	Coxless pair	July 23
Gold	Robert Detweiler; James Dunbar; William Fields; Wayne Frye; Charles Manring (c); Richard Murphy; Henry Proctor; Frank Shakespeare; Edward Stevens	Rowing	Eight	July 23
Gold	William Smith	Wrestling	Freestyle welterweight	July 23
Gold	Harrison Dillard	Athletics	Men's 110 m hurdles	July 24
Gold	Cy Young	Athletics	Men's javelin throw	July 24
Gold	Horace Ashenfelter	Athletics	Men's 3000 m steeplechase	July 25
Gold	Huelet Benner	Shooting	50 m pistol	July 25
Gold	Bob Mathias	Athletics	Men's decathlon	July 26
Gold	Tommy Kono	Weightlifting	67.5 kg	July 26
Gold	Pete George	Weightlifting	75 kg	July 26
Gold	Harrison Dillard; Lindy Remigino; Dean Smith; Andy Stanfield	Athletics	Men's 4 × 100 m relay	July 27
Gold	Mae Faggs; Catherine Hardy; Barbara Jones; Janet Moreau	Athletics	Women's 4 × 100 m relay	July 27
Gold	Frank Havens	Canoeing	Men's C-1 10,000 m	July 27
Gold	Clarke Scholes	Swimming	Men's 100 m freestyle	July 27
Gold	Norbert Schemansky	Weightlifting	90 kg	July 27
Gold	John Davis	Weightlifting	+90 kg	July 27
Gold	David Browning	Diving	Men's 3 m springboard	July 28
Gold	Britton Chance; Michael Schoettle; Edgar White; Sumner White	Sailing	5.5 Meter	July 28
Gold	Everard Endt; John Adams Morgan; Eric Ridder; Julian Roosevelt; Emelyn Whiton	Sailing	6 Meter	July 28
Gold	Frank Dooley^{[a]} Burwell Jones^{[a]} Ford Konno; Jimmy McLane; Wayne Moore; Don Sheff^{[a]} Wally Wolf^{[a]} Bill Woolsey	Swimming	Men's 4 × 200 m freestyle relay	July 29
Gold	Pat McCormick	Diving	Women's 3 m springboard	July 30
Gold	Sammy Lee	Diving	Men's 10 m platform	August 1
Gold	Yoshi Oyakawa	Swimming	Men's 100 m backstroke	August 1
Gold	United States men's national basketball team: Ron Bontemps; Marc Freiberger; Wayne Glasgow; Charlie Hoag; Bill Hougland; John Keller; Dean Kelley; Bob Kenney; Bob Kurland; Bill Lienhard; Clyde Lovellette; Frank MaCabe; Dan Pippin; Howie Williams	Basketball	Men's tournament	August 2
Gold	Nate Brooks	Boxing	Flyweight	August 2
Gold	Charles Adkins	Boxing	Light welterweight	August 2
Gold	Floyd Patterson	Boxing	Middleweight	August 2
Gold	Norvel Lee	Boxing	Light heavyweight	August 2
Gold	Ed Sanders	Boxing	Heavyweight	August 2
Gold	Pat McCormick	Diving	Women's 10 m platform	August 2
Gold	Ford Konno	Swimming	Men's 1500 m freestyle	August 2
Silver	Ken Wiesner	Athletics	Men's high jump	July 20
Silver	Meredith Gourdine	Athletics	Men's long jump	July 21
Silver	Darrow Hooper	Athletics	Men's shot put	July 21
Silver	Don Laz	Athletics	Men's pole vault	July 22
Silver	Thane Baker	Athletics	Men's 200 m	July 23
Silver	Jay Thomas Evans	Wrestling	Freestyle lightweight	July 23
Silver	Henry Wittenberg	Wrestling	Freestyle light heavyweight	July 23
Silver	Jack Davis	Athletics	Men's 110 m hurdles	July 24
Silver	Bill Miller	Athletics	Men's javelin throw	July 24
Silver	Bob McMillen	Athletics	Men's 1500 m	July 26
Silver	Milt Campbell	Athletics	Men's decathlon	July 26
Silver	Gene Cole; Ollie Matson; Charles Moore; Mal Whitfield	Athletics	Men's 4 × 400 m relay	July 27
Silver	Stanley Stanczyk	Weightlifting	82.5 kg	July 27
Silver	James Bradford	Weightlifting	+90 kg	July 27
Silver	Miller Anderson	Diving	Men's 3 m springboard	July 28
Silver	John Price; John Reid	Sailing	Star	July 28
Silver	Ford Konno	Swimming	Men's 400 m freestyle	July 30
Silver	Paula Jean Myers-Pope	Diving	Women's 10 m platform	August 2
Silver	Bowen Stassforth	Swimming	Men's 200 m breaststroke	August 2
Bronze	Jim Fuchs	Athletics	Men's shot put	July 21
Bronze	James Dillion	Athletics	Men's discus throw	July 22
Bronze	James Gathers	Athletics	Men's 200 m	July 23
Bronze	Matt Leanderson; Carl Lovsted; Al Rossi (c); Al Ulbrickson; Richard Wahlstrom	Rowing	Coxed four	July 23
Bronze	Josiah Henson	Wrestling	Freestyle featherweight	July 23
Bronze	Arthur Barnard	Athletics	Men's 110 m hurdles	July 24
Bronze	Ollie Matson	Athletics	Men's 400 m	July 25
Bronze	Floyd Simmons	Athletics	Men's decathlon	July 26
Bronze	Bob Clotworthy	Diving	Men's 3 m springboard	July 28
Bronze	Arthur Jackson	Shooting	50 m rifle, prone	July 29
Bronze	Zoe Ann Olsen-Jensen	Diving	Women's 3 m springboard	July 30
Bronze	Jack Taylor	Swimming	Men's 100 m backstroke	August 1
Bronze	Jody Alderson; Evelyn Kawamoto; Jackie LaVine; Marilee Stepan	Swimming	Women's 4 × 100 m freestyle relay	August 1
Bronze	Juno Stover-Irwin	Diving	Women's 10 m platform	August 2
Bronze	Charles Hough Jr. Walter Staley; John Wofford	Equestrian	Team eventing	August 2
Bronze	Evelyn Kawamoto	Swimming	Women's 400 m freestyle	August 2
Bronze	Arthur McCashin; John Russell; William Steinkraus	Equestrian	Team jumping	August 3

Medals by sport
Sport	1st place, gold medalist(s)	2nd place, silver medalist(s)	3rd place, bronze medalist(s)	Total
Athletics	15	10	6	31
Boxing	5	0	0	5
Diving	4	2	3	9
Swimming	4	2	3	9
Weightlifting	4	2	0	6
Sailing	2	1	0	3
Rowing	2	0	1	3
Wrestling	1	2	1	4
Shooting	1	0	1	2
Basketball	1	0	0	1
Canoeing	1	0	0	1
Equestrian	0	0	2	2
Total	40	19	17	76

Medals by day
Day	Date	1st place, gold medalist(s)	2nd place, silver medalist(s)	3rd place, bronze medalist(s)	Total
1	July 20	1	1	0	2
2	July 21	4	2	1	7
3	July 22	3	1	1	5
4	July 23	4	3	3	10
5	July 24	2	2	1	5
6	July 25	2	0	1	3
7	July 26	3	2	1	6
8	July 27	6	3	0	9
9	July 28	3	2	1	6
10	July 29	1	0	1	2
11	July 30	1	1	1	3
12	July 31	0	0	0	0
13	August 1	2	0	2	4
14	August 2	8	2	3	13
15	August 3	0	0	1	1
Total		40	19	17	76

Medals by gender
Gender	1st place, gold medalist(s)	2nd place, silver medalist(s)	3rd place, bronze medalist(s)	Total
Male	37	18	13	68
Female	3	1	4	8
Total	40	19	17	76

Multiple medalists
Name	Sport	1st place, gold medalist(s)	2nd place, silver medalist(s)	3rd place, bronze medalist(s)	Total
Ford Konno	Swimming	2	1	0	3
Harrison Dillard	Athletics	2	0	0	2
Pat McCormick	Diving	2	0	0	2
Lindy Remigino	Athletics	2	0	0	2
Andy Stanfield	Athletics	2	0	0	2
Charles Moore	Athletics	1	1	0	2
Mal Whitfield	Athletics	1	1	0	2
Ollie Matson	Athletics	0	1	1	2
Evelyn Kawamoto	Swimming	0	0	2	2

^{a} Athletes who participated in preliminary round(s) but not the final.

== Athletics ==
Track and road events
Men

Athlete	Event	Heat		Quarterfinal		Semifinal		Final	
Athlete	Event	Time	Rank	Time	Rank	Time	Rank	Time	Rank
Art Bragg	100 m	10.73	1 Q	10.75	2 Q	11.43	6	Did not advance	
Lindy Remigino	100 m	10.73	1 Q	10.68	1 Q	10.74	2 Q	10.79	1st place, gold medalist(s)
Dean Smith	100 m	10.90	1 Q	10.69	1 Q	10.78	2 Q	10.84	4
Thane Baker	200 m	21.62	1 Q	21.64	1 Q	21.50	2 Q	20.97	2nd place, silver medalist(s)
James Gathers	200 m	21.42	1 Q	21.64	1 Q	21.58	2 Q	21.08	3rd place, bronze medalist(s)
Andy Stanfield	200 m	22.00	1 Q	21.21	1 Q	21.23	1 Q	20.81	1st place, gold medalist(s)
Gene Cole	400 m	48.44	1 Q	47.88	2 Q	46.94	4	Did not advance	
Ollie Matson	400 m	48.17	1 Q	47.53	2 Q	46.99	3 Q	46.94	3rd place, bronze medalist(s)
Mal Whitfield	400 m	48.68	1 Q	47.74	1 Q	46.64	3 Q	47.30	6
John Barnes	800 m	1:54.5	2 Q	—N/a		1:53.4	4	Did not advance	
Reggie Pearman	800 m	1:51.6	1 Q	—N/a		1:52.5	3 Q	1:52.1	7
Mal Whitfield	800 m	1:52.5	1 Q	—N/a		1:50.1	2 Q	1:49.2	1st place, gold medalist(s)
Warren Druetzler	1500 m	3:51.4	1 Q	—N/a		3:50.8	4 Q	3:56.0	12
Bob McMillen	1500 m	3:55.8	2 Q	—N/a		3:50.6	4 Q	3:45.2	2nd place, silver medalist(s)
Javier Montez	1500 m	3:58.2	6	—N/a		Did not advance			
Charlie Capozzoli	5000 m	14:39.0	7	—N/a				Did not advance	
Wes Santee	5000 m	15:10.4	13	—N/a				Did not advance	
Curt Stone	5000 m	14:42.8	8	—N/a				Did not advance	
Curt Stone	10,000 m	—N/a						31:02.6	20
Fred Wilt	10,000 m	—N/a						31:04.0	21
Arthur Barnard	110 m hurdles	14.4	1 Q	—N/a		14.2	2 Q	14.1	3rd place, bronze medalist(s)
Jack Davis	110 m hurdles	14.0	1 Q	—N/a		14.4	1 Q	13.7 OR	2nd place, silver medalist(s)
Harrison Dillard	110 m hurdles	13.9	1 Q	—N/a		14.0	1 Q	13.7 OR	1st place, gold medalist(s)
Roland Blackmon	400 m hurdles	54.8	3 Q	52.7	2 Q	52.7	5	Did not advance	
Charles Moore	400 m hurdles	51.8	1 Q	50.8 OR	1 Q	52.0	1 Q	50.8	1st place, gold medalist(s)
Lee Yoder	400 m hurdles	55.2	2 Q	53.3	2 Q	53.0	4	Did not advance	
Bill Ashenfelter	3000 m steeplechase	DNF		—N/a				Did not advance	
Horace Ashenfelter	3000 m steeplechase	8:51.0 OR	1 Q	—N/a				8:45.4 WR	1st place, gold medalist(s)
Browning Ross	3000 m steeplechase	9:44.0	12	—N/a				Did not advance	
Harrison Dillard; Lindy Remigino; Dean Smith; Andy Stanfield	4 × 100 m relay	40.3	1 Q	—N/a		40.4	1 Q	40.1	1st place, gold medalist(s)
Gene Cole; Ollie Matson; Charles Moore; Mal Whitfield	4 × 400 m relay	3:11.5	1 Q	—N/a				3:04.0	2nd place, silver medalist(s)
Ted Corbitt	Marathon	—N/a						2:51:09.0	44
Victor Dyrgall	Marathon	—N/a						2:32:52.4	13
Tom Jones	Marathon	—N/a						2:42:50.0	36
Price King	10 km walk	51:08.6	9	—N/a				Did not advance	
Henry Laskau	10 km walk	DSQ		—N/a				Did not advance	
John Deni	50 km walk	—N/a						DNF	
Leo Sjogren	50 km walk	—N/a						DNF	
Adolf Weinacker	50 km walk	—N/a						5:01:00.4	22

Women

Athlete	Event	Heat		Quarterfinal		Semifinal		Final	
Athlete	Event	Time	Rank	Time	Rank	Time	Rank	Time	Rank
Mae Faggs	100 m	12.1	1 Q	12.0	3 Q	12.1	3 Q	12.1	6
Catherine Hardy	100 m	11.9	1 Q	12.1	4	Did not advance			
Janet Moreau	100 m	12.5	2 Q	12.5	5	Did not advance			
Dolores Dwyer	200 m	DNF		—N/a		Did not advance			
Mae Faggs	200 m	24.5	3	—N/a		Did not advance			
Catherine Hardy	200 m	24.8	2 Q	—N/a		24.7	4	Did not advance	
Constance Darnowski	80 m hurdles	12.1	5	—N/a		Did not advance			
Mae Faggs; Catherine Hardy; Barbara Jones; Janet Moreau	4 × 100 m relay	46.5	1 Q	—N/a				45.9 WR	1st place, gold medalist(s)

Field events
Men

Athlete	Event	Qualification		Final	
Athlete	Event	Result	Rank	Result	Rank
Jerome Biffle	Long jump	7.40	2 Q	7.57	1st place, gold medalist(s)
George Brown	Long jump	7.32	4 Q	NM	
Meredith Gourdine	Long jump	7.41	1 Q	7.53	2nd place, silver medalist(s)
Walter Ashbaugh	Triple jump	14.59	=14 Q	15.39	4
Jim Gerhardt	Triple jump	14.98	4 Q	14.69	11
George Shaw	Triple jump	14.39	21	Did not advance	
Arnold Betton	High jump	1.87	=1 Q	1.95	7
Walt Davis	High jump	1.87	=1 Q	2.04 OR	1st place, gold medalist(s)
Ken Wiesner	High jump	1.87	=4 Q	2.01	2nd place, silver medalist(s)
Don Laz	Pole vault	4.00	=6 Q	4.50	2nd place, silver medalist(s)
George Mattos	Pole vault	4.00	=6 Q	4.20	9
Bob Richards	Pole vault	4.00	=6 Q	4.55 OR	1st place, gold medalist(s)
Jim Fuchs	Shot put	15.29	=5 Q	17.06	3rd place, bronze medalist(s)
Darrow Hooper	Shot put	15.48	4 Q	17.39	2nd place, silver medalist(s)
Parry O'Brien	Shot put	16.05	1 Q	17.41 OR	1st place, gold medalist(s)
James Dillion	Discus throw	47.92	5 Q	53.28	3rd place, bronze medalist(s)
Fortune Gordien	Discus throw	50.34	2 Q	52.66	4
Sim Iness	Discus throw	48.90	4 Q	55.03 OR	1st place, gold medalist(s)
Bud Held	Javelin throw	68.62	4 Q	68.42	9
Bill Miller	Javelin throw	64.81	13 Q	72.46	2nd place, silver medalist(s)
Cy Young	Javelin throw	67.26	6 Q	73.78 OR	1st place, gold medalist(s)
Bob Backus	Hammer throw	49.39	23 Q	52.11	13
Marty Engel	Hammer throw	50.00	20 Q	NM	
Samuel Felton	Hammer throw	50.89	15 Q	53.32	11

Women

Athlete	Event	Qualification		Final	
Athlete	Event	Result	Rank	Result	Rank
Mabel Landry	Long jump	5.88	2 Q	5.75	7
Janet Dicks	Shot put	11.44	18	Did not advance	
Marjorie Larney	Javelin throw	41.44	8 Q	40.58	13

Combined event – Men's decathlon

Athlete	Event	100 m	LJ	SP	HJ	400 m	110H	DT	PV	JT	1500 m	Points	Rank
Milt Campbell	Result	10.78	6.74	13.89	1.85	50.9	14.5	40.50	3.30	54.54	5:07.2	6975	2nd place, silver medalist(s)
Milt Campbell	Points	1034	707	759	832	779	953	640	438	617	216	6975	2nd place, silver medalist(s)
Bob Mathias	Result	11.08	6.98	15.30	1.90	50.2	14.7	46.89	4.00	59.21	4:50.8	7887 WR	1st place, gold medalist(s)
Bob Mathias	Points	948	779	912	900	828	894	838	745	715	328	7887 WR	1st place, gold medalist(s)
Floyd Simmons	Result	11.52	7.06	13.18	1.92	51.1	15.0	37.77	3.60	54.69	4:53.4	6788	3rd place, bronze medalist(s)
Floyd Simmons	Points	737	804	688	930	765	813	566	556	620	309	6788	3rd place, bronze medalist(s)

== Basketball ==
Summary

Team	Event	Qualifying round			Group stage				Quarterfinal				Semifinal / Cl	Final / BM / Pl	
Team	Event	Opposition Result	Opposition Result	Opposition Result	Opposition Result	Opposition Result	Opposition Result	Rank	Opposition Result	Opposition Result	Opposition Result	Rank	Opposition Result	Opposition Result	Rank
United States men	Men's tournament	Bye			Hungary; W 66–48	Czechoslovakia; W 74–47	Uruguay; W 56–44	1 Q	Soviet Union; W 86–58	Chile; W 103–55	Brazil; W 57–53	1 Q	Argentina; W 85–57	Soviet Union; W 36–25	1st place, gold medalist(s)

Roster
The team consisted of 14 members. It included five members of the Amateur Athletic Union's Peoria Caterpillars team and two Phillips 66ers. The team also featured seven players from the national champion 1951–52 Kansas Jayhawks men's basketball team, as well as their coach Phog Allen, who served as assistant on the team.

	Position	Height	Weight	Age	Hometown	Team
Ron Bontemps	Guard	6'2"	175	25	Taylorville, Illinois	Peoria Caterpillars (Illinois)
Marc Freiberger	Center	6'11"	215	23	Greenville, Texas	Peoria Caterpillars (Oklahoma)
Wayne Glasgow	Guard/Forward	6'3"	190	26	Dacoma, Oklahoma	Phillips 66ers (Oklahoma)
Charlie Hoag	Guard/Forward	6'2"	185	20	Oak Park, Illinois	Kansas
Bill Hougland	Guard	6'4"	180	22	Beloit, Kansas	Kansas
John Keller	Guard/Forward	6'3"	185	23	Page City, Kansas	Kansas
Dean Kelley	Guard	5'11"	165	20	Morton, Illinois	Kansas
Bob Kenney	Forward	6'2"	185	21	Winfield, Kansas	Kansas
Bob Kurland	Center	7'0"	220	27	Jennings, Missouri	Phillips 66ers (Oklahoma St.)
Bill Lienhard	Forward	6'5"	180	22	Lawrence, Kansas	Kansas
Clyde Lovellette	Forward	6'9"	230	22	Terre Haute, Indiana	Kansas
Frank McCabe	Forward	6'8"	225	25	Grand Rapids, Michigan	Peoria Caterpillars (Marquette)
Dan Pippin	Guard	6'1"	170	25	Waynesville, Missouri	Peoria Caterpillars (Missouri)
Howie Williams	Guard	6'0"	168	24	New Ross, Indiana	Peoria Caterpillars (Purdue)

Group stage

Pos	Team	Pld	W	L	PF	PA	PD	Pts	Qualification
1	United States	3	3	0	195	139	+56	6	Qualified for the quarterfinals
2	Uruguay	3	2	1	167	164	+3	5	Qualified for the quarterfinals
3	Czechoslovakia	3	1	2	161	164	−3	4	
4	Hungary	3	0	3	143	199	−56	3	

Source: Official Report, p. 676

25 July 1952

OR p. 680

United States	66–48	Hungary
Scoring by half: 37–23, 27–25

Tennispalatsi, Helsinki
Referees: Vanderperren (BEL), Wabby (EGY)

25 July 1952

OR p. 682

United States	72–47	Czechoslovakia
Scoring by half: 35–21, 37–26

Tennispalatsi, Helsinki
Referees: Ashri (EGY), Reverberi (ITA)

27 July 1952

OR p. 683

United States	56–44	Uruguay
Scoring by half: 32–27, 24–17

Tennispalatsi, Helsinki
Referees: Siener (FRA), Chuard (SUI)

Quarterfinal

Pos	Team	Pld	W	L	PF	PA	PD	Pts	Qualification
1	United States	3	3	0	246	166	+80	6	Qualified for the semifinals
2	Soviet Union	3	2	1	190	195	−5	5	Qualified for the semifinals
3	Brazil	3	1	2	177	155	+22	4	Qualified for 5th–8th placement playoffs
4	Chile	3	0	3	159	256	−97	3	Qualified for 5th–8th placement playoffs

Source: Official Report, p. 676

28 July 1952

OR p. 684

United States	86–58	Soviet Union
Scoring by half: 36–22, 50–36

Tennispalatsi, Helsinki
Referees: Siener (FRA), Wahby (EGY)

29 July 1952

OR p. 684

United States	103–55	Chile
Scoring by half: 47–32, 56–23

Tennispalatsi, Helsinki
Referees: Ashri (EGY), Posvar (TCH)

30 July 1952

OR p. 686

United States	57–53	Brazil
Scoring by half: 24–26, 33–27

Tennispalatsi, Helsinki
Referees: Wahby (EGY), Posvar (TCH)

Semifinal

31 July 1952

OR p. 688

United States	85–76	Argentina
Scoring by half: 43–39, 42–37

Messuhalli, Helsinki
Referees: Ashri (EGY), Siener (FRA)

Gold medal game

2 August 1952
16:00

OR p. 688

United States	36–25	Soviet Union
Scoring by half: 17–15, 19–10
Pts: Lovellette 9		Pts: Korkia 8

Messuhalli, Helsinki
Referees: Vanderperren (BEL), Wahby (EGY)

== Boxing ==
Athlete	Event	Round of 32	Round of 16	Quarterfinal	Semifinal	Final	
Athlete	Event	Opposition Result	Opposition Result	Opposition Result	Opposition Result	Opposition Result	Rank
Nate Brooks	Flyweight	Luukkonen (FIN); W 3–0	Zmia (AUT); W 3–0	Dobrescu (ROU); W 2–1	Toweel (RSA); W 3–0	Basel (GER); W 3–0	1st place, gold medalist(s)
Davey Moore	Bantamweight	Bye	Schidan (GER); W 3–0	Kang (KOR); L 1–2	Did not advance		
Edson Brown	Featherweight	Bose (IND); W 3–0	Ilie (ROU); W 3–0	Ventaja (FRA); L 0–3	Did not advance		
Robert Bickle	Lightweight	Henricus (CEY); W TKO	Bolognesi (ITA); L 1–2	Did not advance			
Charles Adkins	Light welterweight	Hansen (NOR); W TKO	Carrizales (VEN); W 3–0	Webster (RSA); W 3–0	Visintin (ITA); W 3–0	Mednov (URS); W 2–1	1st place, gold medalist(s)
Louis Gage	Welterweight	Belkacem (FRA); W KO	Torma (TCH); L 1–2	Did not advance			
Ellsworth Webb	Light middleweight	Papp (HUN); L KO	Did not advance				
Floyd Patterson	Middleweight	Bye	Tebbaka (FRA); W 3–0	Jansen (NED); W KO	Sjölin (SWE); W DSQ	Tiță (ROU); W KO	1st place, gold medalist(s)
Norvel Lee	Light heavyweight	Bye	Arnaiz (FRA); W 3–0	Grezlak (POL); W 3–0	Siljander (FIN); W 3–0	Perov (URS); W 3–0	1st place, gold medalist(s)
Ed Sanders	Heavyweight	Bye	Jost (SUI); W KO	Di Segni (ITA); W KO	Niemann (RSA); W KO	Johansson (SWE); W DSQ	1st place, gold medalist(s)

== Canoeing ==
Athlete	Event	Heat		Final	
Athlete	Event	Time	Rank	Time	Rank
Frank Havens	C-1 1000 m	5:09.3	3 Q	5:13.7	4
Frank Havens	C-1 10,000 m	—N/a		57:41.1	1st place, gold medalist(s)
John Haas; Frank Krick	C-2 1000 m	4:43.3	3 Q	4:59.0	7
John Haas; Frank Krick	C-2 10,000 m	—N/a		54:42.5	5
Michael Budrock	K-1 1000 m	4:39.5	5	Did not advance	
William Schuette	K-1 10,000 m	—N/a		52:44.6	14
John Eiseman; Thomas Horton	K-2 1000 m	4:02.9	5	Did not advance	
John Anderson; Paul Bochenwich	K-2 10,000 m	—N/a		48:30.7	14

== Cycling ==
=== Road ===
Athlete	Event	Time	Rank
Thomas O'Rourke	Individual	5:22:33.7	36
David Rhoads	Individual	DNF	
Ronald Rhoads	Individual	DNF	
Donald Sheldon	Individual	5:22:33.3	32
Thomas O'Rourke; David Rhoads; Ronald Rhoads; Donald Sheldon	Team	DNF	

=== Track ===
Sprint

Athlete	Event	Round1	Repechage 1	Quarterfinal	Repechage 2	Semifinal	Repechage 3	Final	
Athlete	Event	Rank	Rank	Rank	Rank	Rank	Rank	Rank	Rank
Steven Hromjak	Sprint	3 R	4	Did not advance					=21
Frank Brilando; Richard Cortright	Tandem	—N/a							14

Pursuit

Athlete	Event	Time trial		Quarterfinal	Semifinal	Final / BM	
Athlete	Event	Time	Rank	Opposition Result	Opposition Result	Opposition Result	Rank
Steven Hromjak; James Lauf; Thomas Montemage; Donald Sheldon	Team		18	Did not advance			

Time trial

Athlete	Event	Time	Rank
Frank Brilando	1000 m time trial	1:17.8	23

== Diving ==
Men

Athlete	Event	Preliminary		Final			
Athlete	Event	Points	Rank	Points	Rank	Total	Rank
Miller Anderson	3 m springboard	88.00	2 Q	111.84	2	199.84	2nd place, silver medalist(s)
David Browning	3 m springboard	89.59	1 Q	115.70	1	205.29	1st place, gold medalist(s)
Bob Clotworthy	3 m springboard	80.64	3 Q	104.28	3	184.92	3rd place, bronze medalist(s)
John Calhoun	10 m platform	70.22	9	Did not advance			
Sammy Lee	10 m platform	86.38	1 Q	69.90	1	156.28	1st place, gold medalist(s)
John McCormack	10 m platform	75.26	4 Q	63.48	5	138.77	4

Women

Athlete	Event	Preliminary		Final			
Athlete	Event	Points	Rank	Points	Rank	Total	Rank
Carol Frick	3 m springboard	52.97	9	Did not advance			
Pat McCormick	3 m springboard	71.85	1 Q	75.45	1	147.30	1st place, gold medalist(s)
Zoe Ann Olsen-Jensen	3 m springboard	54.09	8 Q	73.48	2	127.57	3rd place, bronze medalist(s)
Pat McCormick	10 m platform	51.25	1 Q	28.12	1	79.37	1st place, gold medalist(s)
Paula Jean Myers-Pope	10 m platform	44.22	2 Q	27.41	2	71.63	2nd place, silver medalist(s)
Juno Stover-Irwin	10 m platform	43.60	3 Q	26.89	3	70.49	3rd place, bronze medalist(s)

== Equestrian ==
=== Dressage ===
Athlete	Horse	Event	Score	Rank
Robert Borg	Bill Biddle	Individual	492.0	11
Marjorie Haines	The Flying Dutchman	Individual	446.0	17
Hartmann Pauly	Reno Overdo	Individual	315.5	27
Robert Borg; Marjorie Haines; Hartmann Pauly	See above	Team	1253.5	6

=== Eventing ===
Athlete	Horse	Event	Dressage		Cross-country				Jumping			
Athlete	Horse	Event	Penalties	Rank	Faults	Time penalty	Total	Rank	Faults	Time penalty	Total	Rank
Charles Hough Jr.	Cassivllannus	Individual	111.66	7	0	-51	60.66	8	10	0	70.66	9
Walter Staley	Craigwood Park	Individual	173.5	50	20	-45	148.5	18	20	0	168.5	18
John Wofford	Benny Grimes	Individual	146.00	32	210	-18	338.00	31	10	0	348.00	31
Charles Hough Jr. Walter Staley; John Wofford	See above	Team	431.16	12	230	-114	547.16	3	40	0	587.16	3rd place, bronze medalist(s)

=== Jumping ===
Athlete	Horse	Event	Round 1			Round 2			Total	
Athlete	Horse	Event	Faults	Time	Total	Faults	Time	Total	Penalties	Rank
Arthur McCashin	Miss Budweiser	Individual	12	0	12	4	0	4	16	12
John Russell	Democrat	Individual	7	0	7	16	0	16	23	24
William Steinkraus	Hollandia	Individual	4	0	4	8	1.25	9.25	13.25	11
Arthur McCashin; John Russell; William Steinkraus	See above	Team	23	0	23	28	1.25	29.25	52.25	3rd place, bronze medalist(s)

== Fencing ==
20 fencers represented the United States in 1952.

Men's foil

- Nate Lubell
- Albie Axelrod
- Daniel Bukantz

Men's team foil

- Silvio Giolito, Albie Axelrod, Nate Lubell, Byron Krieger, Daniel Bukantz, Hal Goldsmith

Men's épée

- Edward Vebell
- Paul Makler, Sr.
- Alfred Skrobisch

Men's team épée

- Edward Vebell, Paul Makler, Sr., Alfred Skrobisch, Joe de Capriles, James Strauch, Albert Wolff

Men's sabre

- Joe de Capriles
- George Worth
- Allan Kwartler

Men's team sabre

- Norman Cohn-Armitage, Joe de Capriles, Tibor Nyilas, Alex Treves, George Worth, Allan Kwartler

Women's foil

- Jan York-Romary
- Maxine Mitchell
- Polly Craus

== Football ==
Summary

Team	Event	Preliminary round	Round of 16	Quarterfinal	Semifinal	Final / BM	
Team	Event	Opposition Result	Opposition Result	Opposition Result	Opposition Result	Opposition Result	Rank
United States men	Men's tournament	Italy; L 0–8	Did not advance				

Roster

Head coach: John Wood

Pos.	Player	DoB	Age	Caps	Club	Tournament games	Tournament goals	Minutes played	Sub off	Sub on	Cards yellow/red
GK	Robert Burkard	March 23, 1922		?	(United States) St. Louis Kutis S.C.	1	0	90	0	0	0
MF	Charles Colombo	July 20, 1920	32	?	(United States) St. Louis Simpkins-Ford	1	0	90	0	0	0
FW	Bill Conterio	November 11, 1929	22	0		0	0	0	0	0	0
FW	Elwood Cook	January 12, 1929		0	(United States) St. Louis Simpkins-Ford	1	0	90	0	0	0
DF	Harry Keough	November 15, 1927	24	?	(United States) St. Louis Raiders	1	0	90	0	0	0
DF	Ed McHugh	June 9, 1930	22	0		1	0	90	0	0	0
FW	Ruben Mendoza	June 2, 1931		?	(United States) St. Louis Raiders	1	0	90	0	0	0
FW	Lloyd Monsen	May 7, 1931	21	?	(United States) New York Americans	1	0	90	0	0	0
DF	Willy Schaller	February 23, 1933	19	?		1	0	90	0	0	0
DF	Bill Sheppell	March 11, 1926	26	?	(United States) Newark German-Americans	1	0	90	0	0	0
FW	John Souza	July 12, 1920	32	?	(United States) German Hungarian S.C.	1	0	90	0	0	0
FW	Lawrence Surock	November 9, 1930	21	?	University of Baltimore	1	0	90	0	0	0
FW	Jack Dunn	September 12, 1931	?	?	(United States) Temple University	0	0	0	0	0	0

Andy Keir and Marty Krumm were both named in the United States' squad, but did not play in any matches:

Preliminary round

16 July 1952
19:00

Italy	8–0	United States
Gimona 3', 51', 75'; Pandolfini 16', 62'; Venturi 27'; Fontanesi 52'; Mariani 87'	Report

Ratina Stadion, Tampere
Attendance: 15,342
Referee: Arthur Ellis (GBR)

== Gymnastics ==
Men

Athlete	Event	Floor exercise				Rings				Pommel horse				Vault				Parallel bars				Horizontal bar				Total	
Athlete	Event	C	V	Total	Rank	C	V	Total	Rank	C	V	Total	Rank	C	V	Total	Rank	C	V	Total	Rank	C	V	Total	Rank	Score	Rank
Jack Beckner	Individual	8.15	9.25	17.40	=84	~~7.10~~	8.00	15.10	160	~~8.40~~	~~8.60~~	17.00	=88	9.25	~~8.80~~	18.05	=87	~~8.85~~	9.00	17.85	=81	9.10	8.90	18.00	59	103.40	81
Walter Blattmann	Individual	~~7.80~~	~~8.50~~	16.30	=129	8.20	~~7.70~~	15.90	=137	8.90	~~8.60~~	17.50	=73	9.25	9.10	18.35	=54	9.10	~~8.50~~	17.60	=100	~~8.25~~	~~8.45~~	16.70	=112	102.35	=90
Vincent D'Autorio	Individual	~~8.00~~	9.20	17.20	=94	~~7.85~~	~~7.35~~	15.20	=157	8.85	9.05	17.90	=51	~~7.10~~	9.15	16.25	160	~~9.00~~	8.90	17.90	=74	~~8.75~~	~~8.00~~	16.75	=109	101.20	100
Don Holder	Individual	8.00	~~8.20~~	16.20	=134	8.70	8.20	16.90	=109	9.10	9.20	18.30	=32	9.20	~~8.80~~	18.00	=95	9.05	~~8.00~~	17.05	=118	~~9.05~~	~~8.00~~	17.05	97	103.50	80
Bill Roetzheim	Individual	8.85	9.10	17.95	=53	~~7.90~~	7.95	15.85	=142	9.25	9.35	18.60	=22	~~8.85~~	~~8.75~~	17.60	=114	9.15	8.95	18.10	=60	9.60	9.35	18.95	=17	107.05	59
Ed Scrobe	Individual	8.80	9.05	17.85	=59	9.35	9.05	18.40	=45	9.30	8.80	18.10	=40	9.35	9.00	18.35	=54	9.35	9.45	18.80	=21	9.50	9.40	18.90	=19	110.40	=30
Charles Simms	Individual	~~7.80~~	~~8.85~~	16.65	=117	8.35	~~7.80~~	16.15	=127	~~8.05~~	~~8.05~~	16.10	=106	9.30	9.15	18.45	=40	~~7.25~~	~~8.80~~	16.05	=142	9.45	9.55	19.00	16	102.40	89
Bob Stout	Individual	9.10	9.80	18.90	=8	9.20	9.20	18.40	=45	~~8.75~~	8.80	17.55	=69	~~8.80~~	9.40	18.20	=73	9.30	9.25	18.55	=35	9.25	9.30	18.55	=35	110.15	34
Total	Team	42.90	46.40	—N/a		43.80	42.40	—N/a		45.40	45.20	—N/a		46.35	45.80	—N/a		45.95	45.55	—N/a		46.90	46.50	—N/a		543.15	8

Women

Athlete	Event	Floor exercise				Balance beam				Uneven bars				Vault				Portable apparatus		Total	
Athlete	Event	C	V	Total	Rank	C	V	Total	Rank	C	V	Total	Rank	C	V	Total	Rank	Score	Rank	Score	Rank
Marian Barone	Individual	8.30	8.46	16.76	=103	8.23	8.86	17.09	=73	8.96	8.73	17.69	=43	8.90	8.86	17.76	65	—N/a		69.30	64
Dorothy Dalton	Individual	8.43	8.33	16.76	=103	8.03	7.40	15.43	117	8.36	8.06	16.42	94	8.46	8.66	17.06	=101	—N/a		65.67	=103
Meta Elste	Individual	~~8.96~~	~~8.46~~	17.42	76	~~8.20~~	~~8.96~~	17.16	=69	~~8.73~~	~~8.70~~	17.43	=53	~~0.00~~	~~8.66~~	8.66	131	—N/a		60.67	129
Ruth Grulkowski	Individual	8.96	8.63	17.59	=59	8.56	8.90	17.46	48	8.90	8.13	17.03	=74	8.90	8.30	17.20	=96	—N/a		69.28	=65
Marie Hoesly	Individual	8.70	8.20	16.90	96	8.40	6.30	14.70	126	8.66	8.73	17.39	=56	7.73	8.60	16.33	114	—N/a		65.32	107
Doris Kirkman	Individual	~~7.96~~	~~0.00~~	7.96	134	~~8.10~~	~~0.00~~	8.10	134	~~8.40~~	~~0.00~~	8.40	134	~~7.10~~	~~0.00~~	7.10	134	—N/a		31.56	134
Clara Schroth-Lomady	Individual	9.10	8.96	18.06	=26	8.40	6.96	15.36	118	9.00	8.50	17.50	49	8.63	8.83	17.46	=81	—N/a		68.38	73
Ruth Topalian	Individual	8.33	8.33	16.66	109	8.13	8.20	16.33	100	8.60	8.30	16.90	79	8.96	8.96	17.92	=58	—N/a		67.81	=83
Total	Team	51.82	50.91	—N/a		49.75	46.62	—N/a		52.48	50.45	—N/a		51.58	52.21	—N/a		61.60	16	467.36	15

== Modern pentathlon ==
Three pentathletes represented the United States in 1952.

Athlete	Event	Riding (5000 m show jumping)					Fencing (Épée one-touch)		Shooting (Rapid fire pistol)		Swimming (300 m freestyle)		Running (4000 m cross-country)		Total	
Athlete	Event	Time	TP	Faults	Score	Rank	Wins (DT)	Rank	Hits (Score)	Rank	Time	Rank	Time	Rank	Points	Rank
Frederick Denman	Individual	9:51.3	0	0	100	9	28 (5)	11	20 (186)	6	4:36.9	17	15:35.5	19	62	6
Thad McArthur	Individual	10:09.8	0	0	100	12	23 (6)	23	20 (175)	29	4:13.6	3	14:20.4	1	68	8
Guy Troy	Individual	9:34.3	0	0	100	6	25 (2)	17	20 (185)	8	5:10.9	34	16:19.1	30	95	14
Frederick Denman; Thad McArthur; Guy Troy	Team	—N/a				27	—N/a	50	—N/a	41	—N/a	49	—N/a	48	215	4

== Rowing ==
The United States had 26 rowers participate in all seven rowing events in 1952.

Athlete	Event	Quarterfinal		Repechage 1		Semifinal		Repechage 2		Final	
Athlete	Event	Time	Rank	Time	Rank	Time	Rank	Time	Rank	Time	Rank
Jack Kelly Jr.	Single sculls	7:58.4	1 SF	Bye		7:57.3	2 R2	7:42.0	2	Did not advance	6
Charlie Logg; Tom Price	Coxless pair	7:50.7	4 R1	7:28.4	1 R2	Did not advance		7:36.2	1 F	8:20.7	1st place, gold medalist(s)
James Beggs (c); James Fifer; Duvall Hecht	Coxed pair	8:02.1	1 SF	Bye		8:13.0	4 R2	7:55.5	2	Did not advance	6
Pat Costello; Walter Hoover	Double sculls	7:01.9	2 SF	Bye		7:24.3	2 R2	7:03.6	2	Did not advance	
John Davis; Dempster Jackson; Louis McMillan; James Welsh	Coxless four									Did not advance	6
Matt Leanderson; Carl Lovsted; Al Rossi (c); Al Ulbrickson; Richard Wahlstrom	Coxed four	7:17.9	1 SF	Bye		7:07.6	1 F	Bye		7:37.0	3rd place, bronze medalist(s)
Robert Detweiler; James Dunbar; William Fields; Wayne Frye; Charles Manring (c); Richard Murphy; Henry Proctor; Frank Shakespeare; Edward Stevens	Eight	6:09.0	1 SF	Bye		6:32.1	1 F	Bye		6:25.9	1st place, gold medalist(s)

Qualification Legend: F=Final; SF=Semifinal; R1=First repechage; R2=Semifinal repechage

== Sailing ==
Athlete	Event	Race 1		Race 2		Race 3		Race 4		Race 5		Race 6		Race 7		Total	
Athlete	Event	Rank	Points	Rank	Points	Rank	Points	Rank	Points	Rank	Points	Rank	Points	Rank	Points	Points	Rank
Edward Melaika	Finn	~~DNF~~	~~0~~	21	226	23	186	26	133	DNF	0	24	168	DSQ	0	713	28
John Price; John Reid	Star	1	1423	7	578	1	1423	1	1423	3	946	1	1423	~~8~~	~~520~~	7216	2nd place, silver medalist(s)
Joyce Horton; William Horton Sr. William Horton Jr.	Dragon	~~17~~	~~101~~	6	553	10	331	15	155	13	218	7	486	8	428	2171	11
Britton Chance; Michael Schoettle; Edgar White; Sumner White	5.5 Meter	4	703	1	1305	10	305	~~11~~	~~264~~	3	828	1	1305	1	1305	5751	1st place, gold medalist(s)
Everard Endt; John Adams Morgan; Eric Ridder; Julian Roosevelt; Emelyn Whiton	6 Meter	4	540	~~9~~	~~188~~	1	1142	1	1142	8	239	3	665	1	1142	4870	1st place, gold medalist(s)

== Shooting ==
Six shooters represented the United States in 1952. Huelet Benner won gold in the 50 m pistol and Art Jackson won bronze in the 50 m rifle, prone.

Athlete	Event	Hits	Score	Rank
Huelet Benner	25 m rapid fire pistol	59	572	34
William McMillan	25 m rapid fire pistol	60	575	7
Huelet Benner	50 m pistol	—N/a	553	1st place, gold medalist(s)
Harry Wendell Reeves	50 m pistol	—N/a	515	30
Arthur Jackson	50 m rifle, prone	—N/a	399	3rd place, bronze medalist(s)
Emmett Swanson	50 m rifle, prone	—N/a	396	21
Arthur Jackson	50 m rifle, three position	—N/a	1155	12
Emmett Swanson	50 m rifle, three position	—N/a	1155	13
Robert Sandager	300 m rifle, three position	—N/a	1104	6
Emmett Swanson	300 m rifle, three position	—N/a	1055	18

== Swimming ==
Men

Ranks given are within the heat.

Athlete	Event	Heat		Semifinal		Final	
Athlete	Event	Time	Rank	Time	Rank	Time	Rank
Dick Cleveland	100 m freestyle	57.8	1 Q	58.6	3	Did not advance	
Ronald Gora	100 m freestyle	58.0	1 Q	57.7	1 Q	58.8	8
Clarke Scholes	100 m freestyle	58.3	2 Q	57.1 OR	1 Q	57.4	1st place, gold medalist(s)
Ford Konno	400 m freestyle	4:47.9	2 Q	4:38.6	1 Q	4:31.3	2nd place, silver medalist(s)
Jimmy McLane	400 m freestyle	4:46.5	1 Q	4:42.2	4 Q	4:40.3	7
Wayne Moore	400 m freestyle	4:43.2	1 Q	4:42.0	1 Q	4:40.1	6
Ford Konno	1500 m freestyle	18:53.7	1 Q	—N/a		18:30.3 OR	1st place, gold medalist(s)
Jimmy McLane	1500 m freestyle	19:09.3	1 Q	—N/a		18:51.5	4
Bill Woolsey	1500 m freestyle	19:24.6	2	—N/a		Did not advance	
Yoshi Oyakawa	100 m backstroke	1:06.0	1 Q	1:05.7	1 Q	1:05.4 OR	1st place, gold medalist(s)
Allen Stack	100 m backstroke	1:08.9	2 Q	1:08.0	4 Q	1:07.6	4
Jack Taylor	100 m backstroke	1:07.2	1 Q	1:07.0	2 Q	1:06.4	3rd place, bronze medalist(s)
Jerry Holan	200 m breaststroke	2:36.8	1 Q	2:39.2	4	Did not advance	
Monte Nitzkowski	200 m breaststroke	2:40.6	1 Q	2:41.4	5	Did not advance	
Bowen Stassforth	200 m breaststroke	2:39.3	1 Q	2:38.7	3 Q	2:34.7	2nd place, silver medalist(s)
Wayne Moore; Bill Woolsey; Ford Konno; Jimmy McLane; Wally Wolf; Don Sheff; Frank Dooley; Bumpy Jones	4 × 200 m freestyle	8:50.9	1 Q	—N/a		8:31.1 WR	1st place, gold medalist(s)

Women

Ranks given are within the heat.

Athlete	Event	Heat		Semifinal		Final	
Athlete	Event	Time	Rank	Time	Rank	Time	Rank
Jody Alderson	100 m freestyle	1:07.4	2 Q	1:06.6	1 Q	1:07.1	5
Judy Roberts	100 m freestyle	1:08.2	3 Q	1:08.2	7	Did not advance	
Marilee Stepan	100 m freestyle	1:07.7	1 Q	1:07.4	4 Q	1:08.0	7
Carolyn Green	400 m freestyle	5:23.8	2 Q	5:18.3	2 Q	5:16.5	4
Evelyn Kawamoto	400 m freestyle	5:16.6	1 Q	5:21.2	1 Q	5:14.6	3rd place, bronze medalist(s)
Delia Meulenkamp	400 m freestyle	5:21.4	4 Q	5:27.9	6	Did not advance	
Mary Freeman	100 m backstroke	1:18.0	3	—N/a		Did not advance	
Coralie O'Connor	100 m backstroke	1:19.7	5	—N/a		Did not advance	
Barbara Stark	100 m backstroke	1:17.9	4 Q	—N/a		1:16.2	5
Judy Cornell	200 m breaststroke	3:17.7	5	Did not advance			
Gail Peters	200 m breaststroke	3:13.3	6	Did not advance			
Della Sehorn	200 m breaststroke	3:13.7	6	Did not advance			
Jackie LaVine; Marilee Stepan; Jody Alderson; Evelyn Kawamoto	4 × 100 m freestyle	4:28.1	1 Q	—N/a		4:30.1	3rd place, bronze medalist(s)

== Water polo ==
Summary

Team	Event	Elimination rounds		First round				Semifinal			Final / Cl		
Team	Event	Opposition Result	Opposition Result	Opposition Result	Opposition Result	Opposition Result	Rank	Opposition Result	Opposition Result	Rank	Opposition Result	Opposition Result	Rank
United States men	Men's tournament	Sweden; L 1–5	Romania; W 6–3	Great Britain; W 8–3	Italy; L 4–5	Austria; W 4–1	2 Q	Belgium; W 4–2	Spain; W 6–4	2 Q	Yugoslavia; L 2–4	Hungary; L 0–4	4

Roster
The United States entered a squad of eleven players. They scored 35 goals but only 19 scorers are known.

Head coach: Urho Saari (coach); John Curran (manager)

No.	Pos.	Player	DoB	Age	Caps	Club	Tournament games	Tournament goals
	GK	Harry Bisbey	10 May 1931	21	?	(United States) U.S. Coast Guard	9	?
		Marvin Burns	6 July 1928	24	?	(United States) Lynwood Swim Club	5	1
		Norman Dornblaser	4 November 1933	18	?	(United States) El Segundo Swim Club	7	1
		Robert Hughes	15 December 1930	21	?	(United States) University of Southern California	9	6
		Edward Jaworski	11 March 1926	26	?	(United States) New York Athletic Club	8	?
		Robert Koehler			?		0	0
		William Kooistra	26 August 1926	25	?	(United States) Illinois Athletic Club	7	7
		Norman Lake	8 December 1932	19	?	(United States) El Segundo Swim Club	2	?
		James Norris	7 July 1930	22	?	(United States) El Segundo Swim Club	8	?
		John Spargo	3 June 1931	21	?	(United States) U.S. Air Force	5	4
		Peter Stange	28 February 1931	21	?	(United States) El Segundo Swim Club	3	?

Elimination round

25 July 1952	OR p. 599	Sweden	5–1	United States	Helsinki Swimming Stadium; Referees: T. Batalle (ESP)
25 July 1952	OR p. 599	Scoring by half: 2–1, 3–0			Helsinki Swimming Stadium; Referees: T. Batalle (ESP)

26 July 1952	OR p. 600	United States	6–3	Romania	Helsinki Swimming Stadium; Referees: P. Barbieri (ITA)
26 July 1952	OR p. 600	Scoring by half: 2–1, 4–2			Helsinki Swimming Stadium; Referees: P. Barbieri (ITA)

First round

Pos	Team	Pld	W	D	L	GF	GA	GD	Pts	Qualification
1	Italy	3	3	0	0	17	8	+9	6	Semifinals
2	United States	3	2	0	1	16	9	+7	4	Semifinals
3	Great Britain	3	0	1	2	9	15	−6	1	
4	Austria	3	0	1	2	5	15	−10	1	

Source: Official Report, p. 597
Rules for classification: 1) Points; 2) Head-to-head points; 3) Head-to-head goal difference; 4) Head-to-head goals scored; 5) Goal difference.

27 July 1952	OR p. 600	United States	8–3	Great Britain	Helsinki Swimming Stadium; Referees: B. Rajki (HUN)
27 July 1952	OR p. 600	Scoring by half: 3–2, 5–1			Helsinki Swimming Stadium; Referees: B. Rajki (HUN)

27 July 1952	OR p. 603	Italy	5–4	United States	Helsinki Swimming Stadium; Referees: B. Rajki (HUN)
27 July 1952	OR p. 603	Scoring by half: 3–2, 2–2			Helsinki Swimming Stadium; Referees: B. Rajki (HUN)

29 July 1952	OR p. 603	United States	4–1	Austria	Helsinki Swimming Stadium; Referees: W. Baade (DEN)
29 July 1952	OR p. 603	Scoring by half: 2–1, 2–0			Helsinki Swimming Stadium; Referees: W. Baade (DEN)

Semifinal

Pos	Team	Pld	W	D	L	GF	GA	GD	Pts	Qualification
1	Italy	3	3	0	0	12	6	+6	6	Final
2	United States	3	2	0	1	14	11	+3	4	Final
3	Belgium	3	1	0	2	8	13	−5	2	Classification 5–8
4	Spain	3	0	0	3	9	13	−4	0	Classification 5–8

Source: Official Report, p. 598
Rules for classification: 1) Points; 2) Head-to-head points; 3) Head-to-head goal difference; 4) Head-to-head goals scored; 5) Goal difference.

30 July 1952	OR p. 604	United States	4–2	Belgium	Helsinki Swimming Stadium; Referees: A. Weghofer (AUT)
30 July 1952	OR p. 604	Scoring by half: 4–1, 0–1			Helsinki Swimming Stadium; Referees: A. Weghofer (AUT)

31 July 1952	OR p. 604	United States	6–4	Spain	Helsinki Swimming Stadium; Referees: G. Voogd (NED)
31 July 1952	OR p. 604	Scoring by half: 2–2, 4–2			Helsinki Swimming Stadium; Referees: G. Voogd (NED)

Final

Pos	Team	Pld	W	D	L	GF	GA	GD	Pts
1	Hungary	3	2	1	0	13	4	+9	5
2	Yugoslavia	3	2	1	0	9	5	+4	5
3	Italy	3	1	0	2	8	14	−6	2
4	United States	3	0	0	3	6	13	−7	0

Source: Official Report, p. 598
Rules for classification: 1) Points; 2) Head-to-head points; 3) Head-to-head goal difference; 4) Head-to-head goals scored; 5) Goal difference.

1 August 1952	OR p. 604	Yugoslavia	4–2	United States	Helsinki Swimming Stadium; Referees: J. Bauwens (BEL)
1 August 1952	OR p. 604	Scoring by half: 2–1, 2–1			Helsinki Swimming Stadium; Referees: J. Bauwens (BEL)

2 August 1952	OR p. 605	Hungary	4–0	United States	Helsinki Swimming Stadium; Referees: S. Zuckerman (SWE)
2 August 1952	OR p. 605	Scoring by half: 3–0, 1–0			Helsinki Swimming Stadium; Referees: S. Zuckerman (SWE)

== Weightlifting ==
Athlete	Event	Press		Snatch		Clean & Jerk		Total	
Athlete	Event	Weight	Rank	Weight	Rank	Weight	Rank	Weight	Rank
Tommy Kono	67.5 kg	105	=1	117.5 WR	1	140	=2	362.5 OR	1st place, gold medalist(s)
Pete George	75 kg	115	=3	127.5 OR	1	157.5 OR	1	400 OR	1st place, gold medalist(s)
Clyde Emrich	82.5 kg	120	=5	115	=7	145	=10	380	8
Stanley Stanczyk	82.5 kg	127.5	=1	127.5	=1	160	=2	415	2nd place, silver medalist(s)
Norbert Schemansky	90 kg	127.5	2	140 WR	1	177.5 WR	1	445 WR	1st place, gold medalist(s)
James Bradford	+90 kg	140	=4	132.5	2	165	=1	437.5	2nd place, silver medalist(s)
John Davis	+90 kg	150 OR	=1	145 OR	1	165	=1	460 OR	1st place, gold medalist(s)

== Wrestling ==
Key:

- TF – Victory by fall.
- PP - Win by decision

Athlete	Event	Elimination rounds						Medal round			
Athlete	Event	Opposition Result (Penalty points)	Opposition Result (Penalty points)	Opposition Result (Penalty points)	Opposition Result (Penalty points)	Opposition Result (Penalty points)	TPP	Opposition Result (Penalty points)	Opposition Result (Penalty points)	V–D (PP)	Rank
Hugh Peery	Freestyle flyweight	El-Ward (EGY); W 3–0 PP (1)	Johansson (SWE); W 3–0 PP (1)	Sayadov (URS); L 0–3 PP (3)	EL		5	—N/a	Did not advance		=7
Bill Borders	Freestyle bantamweight	Hänni (SUI); W 3–0 PP (1)	Yaghoubi (IRN); L 0–3 PP (3)	Mammadbeyov (URS); L TF (3)	EL		7	Did not advance			=11
Josiah Henson	Freestyle featherweight	Randi (ITA); L TF (3)	Elliott (AUS); W TF (0)	Hoffmann (HUN); W TF (0)	Dadashov (URS); W 2–1 PP (1)	Mangave (IND); W 3–0 PP (1)	5 Q	Şit (TUR); L TF (3)	Givehchi (IRN); L 1–2 PP (3)	0–2	3rd place, bronze medalist(s)
Jay Thomas Evans	Freestyle lightweight	Badr (EGY); W 3–0 PP (1)	Vard (IRL); W TF (0)	Blasi (ARG); W 3–0 PP (1)	Cools (BEL); W TF (0)	Talosela (FIN); W TF (0)	2 Q	Anderberg (SWE); L 1–2 PP (3)	Jahanbakht (IRN); W 3–0 PP (1)	1–1	2nd place, silver medalist(s)
William Smith	Freestyle welterweight	Rosado (MEX); W TF (0)	Mohammed (CAN); W 2–0 PP (1)	Longarella (ARG); W 3–0 PP (1)	Moussa (EGY); W TF (0)	—N/a	2 Q	Berlin (SWE); L 0–3 PP (3)	Mojtabavi (IRN); W 3–0 PP (1)	1–1 (6)	1st place, gold medalist(s)
Danny Hodge	Freestyle middleweight	Hussain (EGY); W TF (0)	Tsimakuridze (URS); L TF (3)	Lindblad (SWE); L 1–2 PP (3)	EL		6	Did not advance			=9
Henry Wittenberg	Freestyle light heavyweight	Padron (VEN); W TF (0)	Lardon (SUI); W TF (0)	Palm (SWE); L 0–3 PP (3)	Englas (URS); W 3–0 PP (1)	Atan (TUR); W TF (0)	4 Q	—N/a	Bye	1–1	2nd place, silver medalist(s)
William Kerslake	Freestyle heavyweight	Atan (TUR); L TF (3)	Baarendse (BEL); W TF (0)	Kangasniemi (FIN); W TF (0)	Antonsson (SWE); L 1–2 PP (3)	—N/a	6	Did not advance			5
