= Equestrian at the 1952 Summer Olympics – Individual dressage =

Equestrian at the Olympics

Individual dressage at the Games of the XV Olympiad
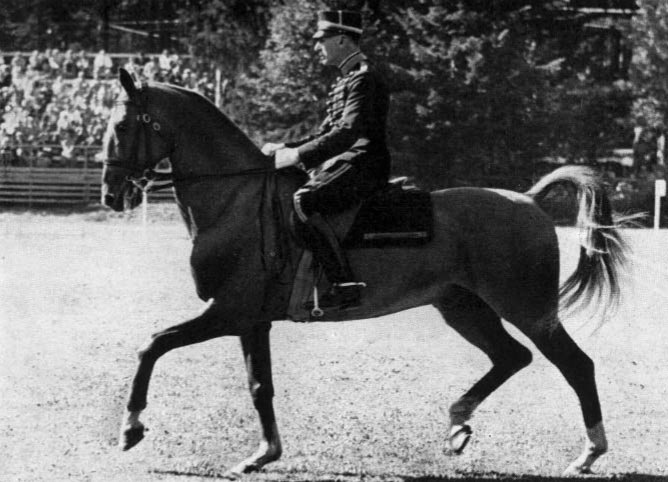
- Henri Saint Cyr and Master Rufus
- Venue: Ruskeasuo Equestrian Hall
- Date: 28–29 July 1956
- Competitors: 27 from 10 nations

Medalists
1st place, gold medalist(s)		Henri Saint Cyr	Sweden
2nd place, silver medalist(s)		Lis Hartel	Denmark
3rd place, bronze medalist(s)		André Jousseaume	France

The individual dressage at the 1952 Summer Olympics took place between 28 and 29 July, at the Ruskeasuo Equestrian Hall. The event was open to women for the first time; of the 27 riders, 4 were female—including silver medalist Lis Hartel.

== Competition format ==
The team and individual dressage competitions used the same results. Competitors were given 15 minutes to complete their corresponding tests. For each second over the 15-minute mark, contestants lost half a point.

== Results ==
Rank	Rider	Nation	Horse	Score
1st place, gold medalist(s)	Henri Saint Cyr	Sweden	Master Rufus	561.0
2nd place, silver medalist(s)	Lis Hartel	Denmark	Jubilee	541.5
3rd place, bronze medalist(s)	André Jousseaume	France	Harpagon	541.0
4	Gottfried Trachsel	Switzerland	Kursus	531.0
5	Gustaf Adolf Boltenstern, Jr.	Sweden	Krest	531.0
6	Henri Chammartin	Switzerland	Wöhler	529.5
7	Heinz Pollay	Germany	Adular	518.5
8	Gustav Fischer	Switzerland	Soliman	518.5
9	Gehnäll Persson	Sweden	Knaust	505.5
10	Ida von Nagel	Germany	Afrika	503.0
11	Bob Borg	United States	Bill Biddle	492.0
12	Fritz Thiedemann	Germany	Chronist	479.5
13	Jean Peitevin de Saint André	France	Vol au Vent	479.0
14	José Larraín	Chile	Rey de Oros	473.5
15	Else Christophersen	Norway	Diva	459.0
16	Héctor Clavel	Chile	Frontalera	452.0
17	Marjorie Haines	United States	The Flying Dutchman	446.0
18	Kristian Jensen	Denmark	Odense	439.0
19	Vladimir Raspopov	Soviet Union	Imeninnik	433.5
20	António Reymão Nogueira	Portugal	Napeiro	428.5
21	Francisco Valadas Júnior	Portugal	Feitico	422.0
22	Ernesto Silva	Chile	Viarregio	415.0
23	Jean Saint-Fort Paillard	France	Tapir	403.5
24	Vasily Tikhonov	Soviet Union	Pevec	395.0
25	Nikolay Sitko	Soviet Union	Cesar	377.0
26	Fernando Paes	Portugal	Matamas	346.0
27	Hartmann Pauly	United States	Reno Overdo	315.5
