= Equestrian at the 1952 Summer Olympics – Team dressage =

Equestrian at the Olympics

Team dressage at the Games of the XV Olympiad
- Venue: Ruskeasuo Equestrian Hall
- Date: 28–29 July 1956
- Competitors: 24 (8 teams) from 8 nations

Medalists
1st place, gold medalist(s)		Gustaf Adolf Boltenstern, Jr. Gehnäll Persson; Henri Saint Cyr	Sweden
2nd place, silver medalist(s)		Gustav Fischer; Gottfried Trachsel; Henri Chammartin	Switzerland
3rd place, bronze medalist(s)		Fritz Thiedemann; Ida von Nagel; Heinz Pollay	Germany

The team dressage at the 1952 Summer Olympics took place between 28 and 29 July at the Ruskeasuo Equestrian Hall. The event was open to women for the first time; of the 24 riders, 2 were female—including one member of the bronze medalist German team, Ida von Nagel.

== Competition format ==
The team and individual dressage competitions used the same results. Competitors were given 15 minutes to complete their corresponding tests. For each second over the 15-minute mark, contestants lost half a point. Each team was ranked according to the total scores from their three members.

== Results ==
Rank	Nation	Rider	Horse	Individual Score	Team Score
1st place, gold medalist(s)	Sweden	Henri Saint Cyr; Gustaf Adolf Boltenstern, Jr. Gehnäll Persson	Master Rufus; Krest; Knaust	561.0; 531.0; 505.5	1597.5
2nd place, silver medalist(s)	Switzerland	Gottfried Trachsel; Henri Chammartin; Gustav Fischer	Kursus; Wöhler; Soliman	531.0; 529.5; 518.5	1579.0
3rd place, bronze medalist(s)	Germany	Heinz Pollay; Ida von Nagel; Fritz Thiedemann	Adular; Afrika; Chronist	518.5; 503.0; 479.5	1501.0
4	France	André Jousseaume; Jean Peitevin de Saint André; Jean Saint-Fort Paillard	Harpagon; Vol au Vent; Tapir	541.0; 479.0; 403.5	1423.5
5	Chile	José Larraín; Héctor Clavel; Ernesto Silva	Rey de Oros; Frontalera; Viarregio	473.5; 452.0; 415.0	1340.5
6	United States	Bob Borg; Marjorie Haines; Hartmann Pauly	Bill Biddle; The Flying Dutchman; Reno Overdo	492.0; 446.0; 315.5	1253.5
7	Soviet Union	Vladimir Raspopov; Vasily Tikhonov; Nikolay Sitko	Imeninnik; Pevec; Cesar	433.5; 395.0; 377.0	1205.5
8	Portugal	António Reymão Nogueira; Francisco Valadas Júnior; Fernando Paes	Napeiro; Feitico; Matamas	428.5; 422.0; 346.0	1196.5
