= Lis Hartel =

Danish equestrian (1921–2009)

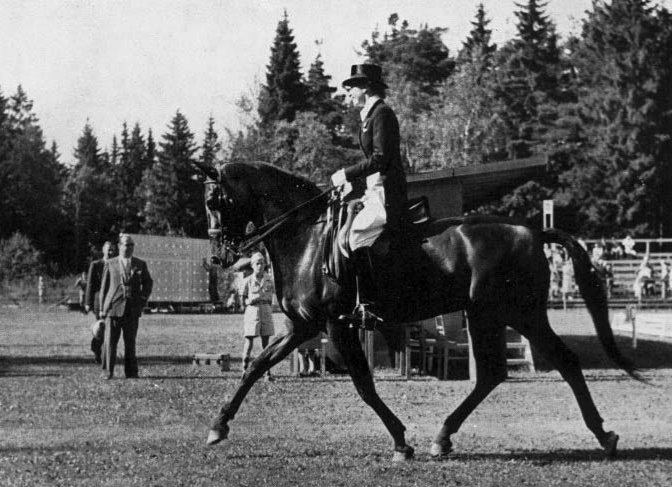

Personal information
- Full name: Lis Hartel
- Born: March 14, 1921
- Died: February 12, 2009 (aged 87)

Sport
- Country: Denmark
- Event: equestrian
Medal record
Equestrian
Representing Denmark
Silver medal – second place	1952 Helsinki	Individual Dressage
Silver medal – second place	1956 Stockholm	Individual Dressage

Lis Hartel (March 14, 1921 – February 12, 2009) was an Olympic equestrian competitor from Denmark.

At the 1952 Helsinki Olympic Games, Hartel was one of four women who were the first to compete in modern equestrian sports at the Summer Olympics, also including Ida von Nagel, representing Germany; Elsa Christophersen, from Norway; and Marjorie Haines, from the United States. Hartel became the first female equestrian to win a medal in individual dressage.

== History ==
Lis Holst was born on 14 March 1921 to equestrians Ejnar Peter Holst and Else Harriet Holst (née Schmidt), in the coastal town of Hellerup, Denmark, just north of Copenhagen. She was originally trained in equestrian sports by her mother, Else Holst, but began to be coached by Danish Olympic trainer Gunnar Andersen when she became nationally competitive.

She began in dressage at an early age alongside her sister, Tove Holst (later Jorck-Jorckston), but also competed in show jumping as a teenager. By 1934, at the age of 13, Lis was competing extensively in dressage and show jumping competitions.

She married Poul Finn Hartel on 23 March 1941; and, in 1942, their first daughter, Pernille "Pia" Hartel (later Siesbye), was born.

Lis Hartel became the Danish dressage champion in 1943 and 1944. In September 1944, at age 23 and pregnant with her second child, Lis contracted polio, which permanently paralyzed her below the knees, as well as affecting her arms and hands. Despite contracting polio while pregnant at the time, she bore a healthy daughter, Anne Hartel (later Værnet), in 1945.

Hartel was determined to continue her equestrian career despite medical advice otherwise, and in 1947 she finished second at the Scandinavian championships, although she had to be helped onto her horse when she rode.

Dressage at the Olympics was open only to commissioned military officers until 1952, and in that year Hartel was one of the first women to compete against men in an equestrian sport at the Olympics. Her silver medal in 1952 for Individual Dressage was the first by any woman in any individual sport when in direct competition with men at the Olympics, and she was also the Danish champion in dressage that year. She continued to be Danish champion in dressage in 1953, 1954, 1956 and 1959.

In 1956, she also won another silver medal, this time at the 1956 Olympics in Melbourne, Australia (the Equestrian Games of those Olympics were held in Stockholm because of Australian quarantine laws for horses).

After retiring from competitive riding, Hartel gave demonstrations, raising money for polio sufferers and supporting therapeutic riding for people with disabilities. The Lis Hartel Foundation in the Netherlands, named after her, offers such riding opportunities.

In 1992 Hartel was inducted into Denmark's Hall of Fame, and in 2005 she was named one of Denmark's top 10 athletes of all time.

== Horse ==
Lis Hartel primarily rode Jubilee, a Thoroughbred/Oldenburg cross mare owned by the Holst family, during the Olympic Games. The mare was bred in Denmark in 1941 by Otto Viller Petersen, and was sired by the Thoroughbred stallion Rockwood out of an imported Oldenburg mare of unknown pedigree. (Note: There is no "Rockwood" Thoroughbred stallion registered with the Jockey Club that fits this time period, so the exact pedigree of Jubilee is unclear. It is possible that "Rockwood" could refer to the American Thoroughbred stallion Rockwood Dandy (b. 1942), a sire of broodmares, and by the British stallion Blenheim (b. 1927, Blandford x Malva) out of Dandy One (b. 1932).)

The mare was also not immediately a dressage prospect, based on her conformation, per Lis Hartel's daughter, Pernille Hartel-Siesbye: "Jubilee was neither noble nor beautiful, and she had a very long back. Later when being trained and well-muscled she looked better, but in the stable she remained a rather ordinary looking horse. Visitors who came to see the horse in the stall were often very surprised, and asked if this was really Jubilee."
