= Ciubotaru =

Ciubotaru may refer to:

- Ciubotaru (surname), Romanian surname
- Ciubotaru River, a tributary of the river Siret in Romania
- Haloșul Ciubotaru River, a tributary of the Caşin in Romania
