= Keijirō =

- Gender: Male

Origin
- Origin: Japanese
- Meaning: Different meanings depending on the kanji used

Keijirō, Keijiro or Keijirou (written: 慶治朗, 啓二朗 or 敬次郎) is a masculine Japanese given name. Notable people with the name include:

- Keijiro Matsumoto (松本 啓二朗; born 1986), Japanese baseball player
- Keijiro Ogawa (小川 慶治朗; born 1992), Japanese footballer
- Keijiro Kaitoku (1929–1997), Japanese sailor
- Okano Keijirō (岡野 敬次郎; 1865–1925), Japanese politician
