= Ciubotaru (surname) =

Ciubotaru, Ciobotariu or Ciubotarul is a Romanian-language occupational surname derived from the occupation of ciubotar, bootmaker, a borrowing from Slavic 'chebotar'

The surnames may refer to

- Alexandru Ciubotaru, director of the Chișinău Botanical Garden
- Cristian Ciubotariu, Romanian footballer
- Denis Ciobotariu, Romanian footballer
- Dumitru Ciobotaru, Romanian boxer
- Gheorghe Ciobotaru, Romanian wrestler
- Ionel Ciubotaru, mayor of Roznov, Neamț
- Kevin Ciubotaru, Romanian footballer
- Liviu Ciobotariu, Romanian footballer
- Mihai Ciubotaru, plaintiff in Ciubotaru v. Moldova
