= Weightlifting at the 1952 Summer Olympics – Men's +90 kg =

Men's +90 kg at the Games of the XV Olympiad
- Venue: Messuhalli
- Date: 27 July 1952
- Competitors: 13 from 11 nations
- Winning total: 460 kg OR

Medalists
1st place, gold medalist(s)		John Davis	United States
2nd place, silver medalist(s)		James Bradford	United States
3rd place, bronze medalist(s)		Humberto Selvetti	Argentina

The men's +90 kg weightlifting competitions at the 1952 Summer Olympics in Helsinki took place on 27 July at Messuhalli. It was the seventh appearance of the heavyweight class, and the first at the new 90 kg weight. Previously, all weightlifters above 82.5 kg were included in the heavyweight class.

Each weightlifter had three attempts at each of the three lifts. The best score for each lift was summed to give a total. The weightlifter could increase the weight between attempts (minimum of 5 kg between first and second attempts, 2.5 kg between second and third attempts) but could not decrease weight. If two or more weightlifters finished with the same total, the competitors' body weights were used as the tie-breaker (lighter athlete wins).

== Records ==
Prior to this competition, the existing world and Olympic records were as follows.

World record	Press	Doug Hepburn (CAN)	156.5 kg		1951
World record	Snatch	John Davis (USA)	149.5 kg		1951
World record	Clean & Jerk	John Davis (USA)	182 kg		1951
World record	Total	John Davis (USA)	481.5 kg		1951
Olympic record	Press	John Davis (USA)	137.5 kg	London, United Kingdom	11 August 1948
Olympic record	Snatch	John Davis (USA)	137.5 kg	London, United Kingdom	11 August 1948
Olympic record	Clean & Jerk	John Davis (USA)	177.5 kg	London, United Kingdom	11 August 1948
Olympic record	Total	John Davis (USA)	452.5 kg	London, United Kingdom	11 August 1948

== Results ==
Rank	Athlete	Nation	Body weight	Press (kg)				Snatch (kg)				Clean & Jerk (kg)				Total
Rank	Athlete	Nation	Body weight	1	2	3	Result	1	2	3	Result	1	2	3	Result	Total
1st place, gold medalist(s)	John Davis	United States	104.35	117.5	145	150	150 OR	135	145	—	145 OR	165	~~182.5~~	~~182.5~~	165	460 OR
2nd place, silver medalist(s)	James Bradford	United States	109.80	132.5	140	~~142.5~~	140	125	130	132.5	132.5	155	160	165	165	437.5
3rd place, bronze medalist(s)	Humberto Selvetti	Argentina	127.25	135	145	150	150 OR	115	~~120~~	120	120	150	157.5	162.5	162.5	432.5
4	Heinz Schattner	Germany	124.10	130	~~135~~	~~135~~	130	125	130	~~132.5~~	130	155	162.5	~~172.5~~	162.5	422.5
5	Dave Baillie	Canada	120.90	137.5	145	~~147.5~~	145	~~117.5~~	117.5	122.5	122.5	152.5	~~160~~	~~160~~	152.5	420
6	Norberto Ferreira	Argentina	129.50	135	140	~~142.5~~	140	~~115~~	~~115~~	115	115	145	150	155	155	410
7	Harold Cleghorn	New Zealand	109.35	~~130~~	130	~~135~~	130	117.5	~~122.5~~	~~122.5~~	117.5	152.5	~~157.5~~	~~157.5~~	152.5	400
8	Franz Hölbl	Austria	114.10	110	115	~~120~~	115	110	117.5	~~120~~	117.5	142.5	150	155	155	387.5
9	Lage Andersson	Sweden	114.40	120	125	~~130~~	125	~~105~~	105	110	110	140	145	~~150~~	145	380
10	Adelfino Mancinelli	Italy	120.00	122.5	127.5	~~130~~	127.5	105	~~110~~	~~110~~	105	135	140	~~145~~	140	372.5
11	Eino Mäkinen	Finland	99.40	102.5	107.5	110	110	105	110	~~115~~	110	140	147.5	~~152.5~~	147.5	367.5
12	Valdemar de Silveira	Brazil	105.80	112.5	~~117.5~~	~~117.5~~	112.5	110	~~115~~	~~115~~	110	140	~~145~~	~~145~~	140	362.5
13	Abraham Charité	Netherlands	102.25	110	115	~~120~~	115	—	—	—	—	—	—	—	—	115

== New records ==
Press	150 kg	John Davis (USA); Humberto Selvetti (ARG)	OR
Snatch	145 kg	John Davis (USA)	OR
Total	460 kg	John Davis (USA)	OR
