= Boxing at the 1952 Summer Olympics – Light heavyweight =

Olympic boxing tournament

Light heavyweight boxing at the Games of the XV Olympiad
- Venue: Messuhalli
- Dates: 29 July – 2 August 1952
- Competitors: 18 from 18 nations

Medalists
1st place, gold medalist(s)		Norvel Lee	United States
2nd place, silver medalist(s)		Antonio Pacenza	Argentina
3rd place, bronze medalist(s)		Anatoly Perov	Soviet Union
3rd place, bronze medalist(s)		Harry Siljander	Finland

The men's light heavyweight event was part of the boxing programme at the 1952 Summer Olympics. The weight class allowed boxers of up to 81 kilograms to compete. The competition was held from 29 July to 2 August 1952. 18 boxers from 18 nations competed.

== Medalists ==
Gold	Norvel Lee; United States
Silver	Antonio Pacenza; Argentina
Bronze	Anatoly Perov; Soviet Union
Bronze	Harry Siljander; Finland

== Results ==
Winner	NOC	Result	Loser	NOC
First Round (July 29)
Anatoly Perov	Soviet Union	BYE
Henry Cooper	Great Britain	BYE
Gianbattista Alfonsetti	Italy	BYE
Mohamed Mohamed Elminabaoui	Egypt	BYE
Antonio Pacenza	Argentina	BYE
Rolf Storm	Sweden	BYE
Lucio Grotone	Brazil	BYE
Bjarne Lingås	Norway	BYE
Tadeusz Grzelak	Poland	BYE
Franz Pfitscher	Austria	BYE
Norvel Lee	United States	BYE
Claude Arnaiz	France	BYE
Harry Siljander	Finland	BYE
Dumitru Ciobotaru	Romania	BYE
Toon Pastor	Netherlands	3 – 0	István Fazekas	Hungary
Karl Kistner	Germany	KO 7	Oscar Ward	India
Second Round (July 29 & 30)
Anatoly Perov	Soviet Union	2 – 1	Henry Cooper	Great Britain
Giovan-Battista Alfonsetti	Italy	DSQ 3R	Mohamed Mohamed Elminabaoui	Egypt
Antonio Pacenza	Argentina	2 – 1	Rolf Edvard Storm	Sweden
Lucio Grotone	Brazil	2 – 1	Bjarne Lingås	Norway
Tadeusz Grzelak	Poland	3 – 0	Franz Pfitscher	Austria
Norvel Lee	United States	3 – 0	Claude Arnaiz	France
Harri Siljander	Finland	2 – 1	Dumitru Ciobotaru	Romania
Karl Kistner	Germany	2 – 1	Toon Pastor	Netherlands
Third Round (July 31)
Norvel LaFollette Ray Lee	United States	3 – 0	Tadeusz Grzelak	Poland
Anatoly Perov	Soviet Union	3 – 0	Giovan-Battista Alfonsetti	Italy
Harri Siljander	Finland	2 – 1	Karl Kistner	Germany
Antonio Pacenza	Argentina	3 – 0	Lucio Grotone	Brazil
Semi-final (August 1)
Antonio Pacenza	Argentina	3 – 0	Anatoly Perov	Soviet Union
Norvel Lee	United States	3 – 0	Harri Siljander	Finland
Final (August 2)
Norvel LaFollette Ray Lee	United States	3 – 0	Antonio Pacenza	Argentina
