= Christian Nielsen =

Christian Nielsen may refer to:

- Christian Nielsen (rower) (born 1988), Danish rower
- Christian Nielsen (Danish sailor) (1873–1952), Danish sailor
- Christian Nielsen (Belgian sailor) (born 1932), Belgian sailor
- Christian Nielsen (footballer) (born 1985), Danish football player
- Christian Nielsen (football manager) (born 1974), Danish football manager
- Christian Overgaard Nielsen (1918–1999), Danish zoologist and ecologist
- Christian Frühstück Nielsen (1878–1956), Danish architect
- Christian Charles Nielsen (born 1975), American spree killer
