= Adelfino Mancinelli =

Italian weightlifter

Personal information
- Nationality: Italian
- Born: 1 February 1908 Rome, Italy
- Died: 30 November 1971 (aged 63) Rome

Sport
- Sport: Weightlifting

Adelfino Mancinelli (1 February 1908 – 30 November 1971) was an Italian weightlifter. He competed in the men's heavyweight event at the 1952 Summer Olympics.
