= Franz Pfitscher =

Austrian boxer

Personal information
- Nationality: Austrian
- Born: 3 October 1930; Taormina, Italy
- Died: 26 February 2009 (aged 78)

Sport
- Sport: Boxing

Franz Pfitscher (3 October 1930 – 26 February 2009) was an Austrian boxer. He competed in the men's light heavyweight event at the 1952 Summer Olympics.
