= Toon Pastor =

Dutch boxer

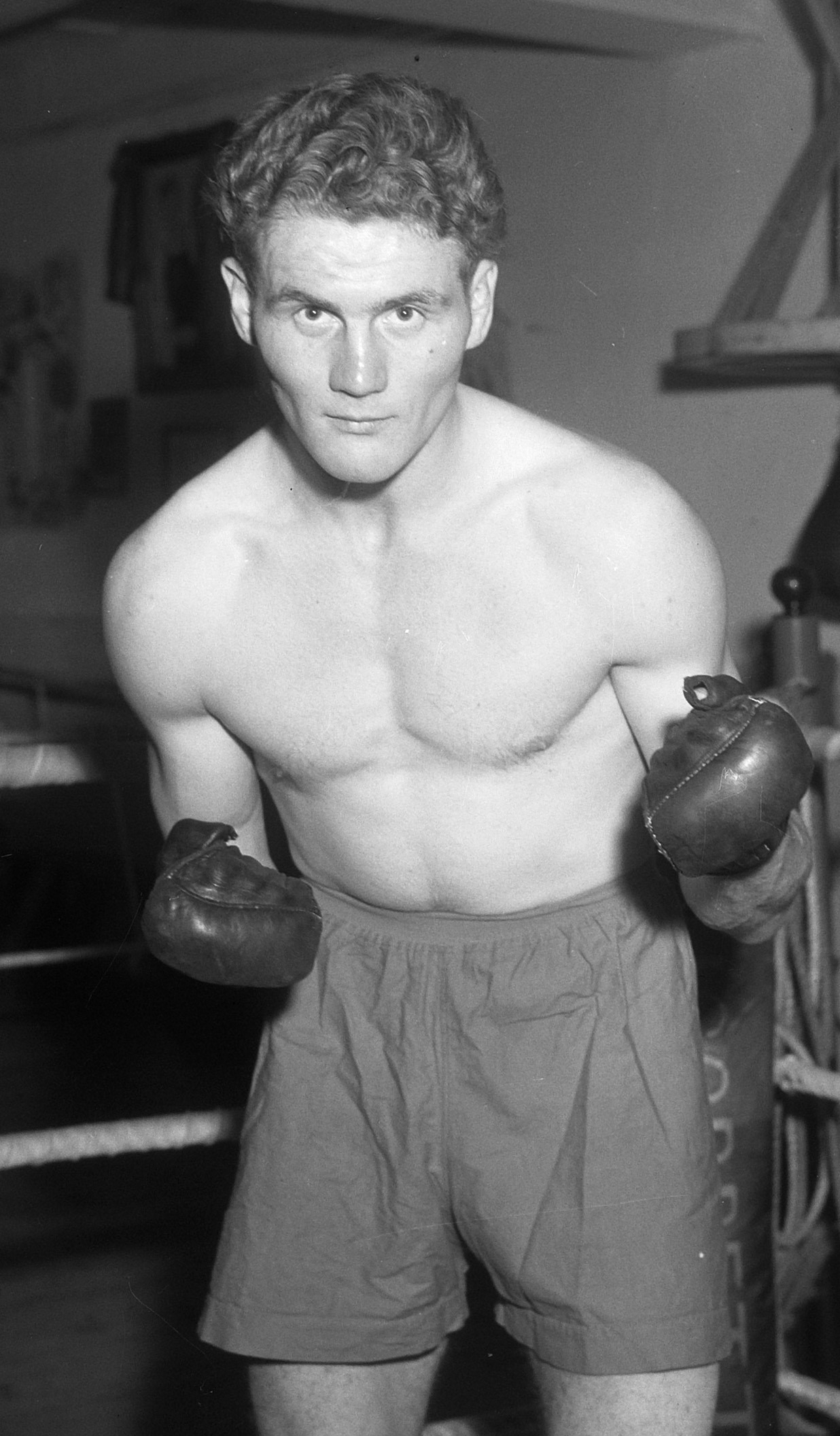
Toon Pastor in 1952

Antonius Franciscus "Toon" Pastor (10 January 1929 – 28 June 2008) was a boxer from the Netherlands, who competed at the 1952 Summer Olympics in Helsinki, Finland. There he lost on points (1–2) in the second round of the light heavyweight (– 81 kg) division to Karl Kistner of Germany. He was born in Amsterdam.
