= John Russell (equestrian) =

American equestrian (1920–2020)

John Russell OLY
Personal information
- Full name: John William Russell
- Born: February 2, 1920 Dauphin, Pennsylvania, U.S.
- Died: September 30, 2020 (aged 100) San Antonio, Texas, U.S.
Medal record
Equestrian
Representing the United States
Olympic Games
Bronze medal – third place	1952 Helsinki	Team jumping

Colonel John William Russell (February 2, 1920 – September 30, 2020) was an American equestrian who won a bronze medal at the 1952 Summer Olympics in Helsinki, Finland. After serving in the United States Army during World War II, he began competing in international equestrian tournaments and was eventually selected to join the United States team at the 1948 Summer Olympics in London. After his success at the 1952 edition, he continued to participate in events around the world, but military duties and a broken bone in his horse caused him to miss the 1956 Summer Olympics. He retired from active competition that year and became the head of United States Modern Pentathlon Training Center, where he coached six United States Olympic modern pentathlon delegations, twenty-two World Championship teams, and helped organize two World Modern Pentathlon Championships. He retired and opened the Russell Equestrian Center and was inducted into the United States Show Jumping Hall of Fame in 2001.

== Early life ==
Russell was born in Dauphin, Pennsylvania. In 1943 he joined the United States Army and served during World War II in Africa, Germany, and Italy. In the latter he was wounded while fighting in Cassino and received the Purple Heart. By the end of the conflict he had attained the rank of lieutenant colonel and acquired numerous decorations, including the Soldier's Medal and the Bronze Star Medal. He then began coaching and riding in Northern Italy in 1946, becoming the first American to capture the equestrian Prize of Nations in 1947.

== Competitive career ==
In 1948 Russell was posted to Fort Riley in Kansas to serve as a riding instructor and became a member of the United States national equestrian team. While rewriting the army's Manual of Horsemanship, he found time to compete in that year's Olympic trials, where he placed second, thereby becoming a member of the last American Olympic equestrian delegation to be chosen from the United States Army. At the 1948 Summer Olympics he finished 21st in a field of 44 competitors in the individual jumping event and also helped represent his country in the team tournament, riding his horse Air Mail in both competitions. Although his military squad disbanded as a competitive force following the games, Russell continued to win international championships over the next several years in the lead up to the 1952 Summer Olympics, which was the first United States Olympic equestrian delegation to accept civilians.

Encouraged by John Wofford, the first president of the United States Equestrian Team and a participant in the 1932 Summer Olympics, Russell participated in the trials to make the 1952 Olympic squad and finished first riding a horse by the name of Democrat. It was with Democrat that Russell, alongside William Steinkraus and Arthur McCashin, captured the bronze medal in the team jumping tournament. He also finished 24th in a field of 51 competitors in the individual jumping event. From 1953 through 1955 he was stationed in Germany, from where he continued to compete internationally, most notably at the 1955 Show Jumping World Championships. He trained to compete at the 1956 Summer Olympics, but military duties and a broken hoof bone in his horse prevented him from attending. He retired from active competition soon thereafter.

== Later life ==
In 1956 Russell returned to the United States where he was assigned to run the United States Modern Pentathlon Training Center at Fort Sam Houston. Over the next several decades, he coached six United States Olympic modern pentathlon delegations, twenty-two World Championship teams, and helped organize the 1959 and 1977 World Modern Pentathlon Championships. In retirement he has operated the Russell Equestrian Center and worked as a judge at national horse shows. In 2000 he was awarded the Pegasus Medal of Honor from the American Horse Shows Association (now part of the United States Equestrian Federation), which was followed up in 2001 by his induction into the United States Show Jumping Hall of Fame. He received the Gold Medal of Honor from the Union Internationale de Pentathlon Moderne and, in February 2012, he was inducted into the San Antonio Sports Hall of Fame. He turned 100 in February 2020 and died in September.
