= Lage Andersson =

Swedish weightlifter

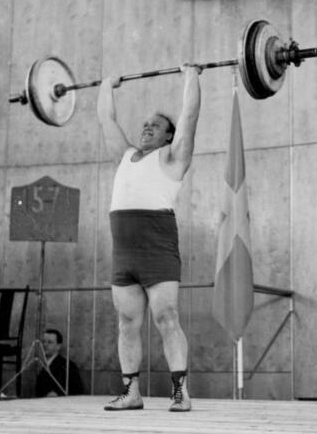
- Andersson in 1951

Personal information
- Nationality: Swedish
- Born: 31 May 1920 Mörbylånga, Sweden
- Died: 14 October 1999 (aged 79) Farsta, Stockholm, Sweden
- Weight: 114 kg (251 lb)

Sport
- Sport: Weightlifting
- Club: Stockholms AK
Medal record
Representing Sweden
European Weightlifting Championships
Bronze medal – third place	1950 Paris	+90 kg
Bronze medal – third place	1952 Helsinki	+90 kg

Lage Viktor Sigurd Andersson (31 May 1920 – 14 October 1999) was a Swedish weightlifter. Competing in the unlimited weight division he won bronze medals at the 1950 and 1952 European championships and placed ninth at the 1952 Olympics.
