= Elwood Cook =

American soccer player

Butch Cook
Personal information
- Full name: Elwood Eugene Cook
- Date of birth: January 12, 1929
- Place of birth: St. Louis, Missouri, US
- Date of death: October 27, 1994 (aged 65)
- Place of death: Los Angeles, California, US

Senior career*
| Years | Team | Apps | (Gls) |
- St. Louis Spicas
- St. Louis Kutis

International career
| 1957 | United States | 4 | (0) |
- * Club domestic league appearances and goals

Elwood “Butch” Cook (January 12, 1929 – October 27, 1994) was an American soccer forward who earned four caps with the U.S. national team in 1957. He was also a member of the 1952 U.S. Olympic soccer team.

Cook was selected for the U.S. soccer team at the 1952 Summer Olympics. The U.S. lost 8–0 to Italy in the first round. He then went on to play for St. Louis Kutis S.C. during the mid-1950s when Kutis was a dominant U.S. soccer club. In 1957, Kutis won the National Challenge Cup, defeating New York Hakoah 3-0 and 3–1 in March and April. In 1957, the U.S. national team began the qualification process for the 1958 FIFA World Cup. Cook was called into the U.S. team which lost the first qualification games to Mexico in April. In preparation for the next two games, against Canada in June, the U.S. Soccer Federation disbanded the team and selected Kutis to represent the U.S. Cook, as a member of Kutis, therefore played in all four U.S. games. Despite substituting the wholesale roster changes, the U.S. lost both games to Canada and failed to qualify for the World Cup.

Cook was inducted into the St. Louis Soccer Hall of Fame on November 14, 1996.
