= Bob Burkard =

American soccer player

Personal information
- Full name: Robert Leland Burkard
- Date of birth: March 23, 1922
- Place of birth: St. Louis, Missouri, United States
- Date of death: May 13, 1992 (aged 70)

Senior career*
Years	Team	Apps	(Gls)
- St. Louis Kutis

International career
1952–1957	United States	2	(0)
- * Club domestic league appearances and goals

Bob Burkard (March 23, 1922 – May 13, 1992) was an American soccer goalkeeper who earned one cap with the U.S. national team in 1957. He was also the United States goalkeeper at the 1952 Summer Olympics.

Burkard was selected to the United States Olympic team at the 1952 Summer Olympics. The United States lost its first game, 8–0, to Italy, eliminated the U.S. from the games. He earned one cap with the United States national team in a July 6, 1957 loss to Canada in a World Cup qualification game.

At the time of the Olympics he played for St. Louis Kutis S.C. and was inducted into the St. Louis Soccer Hall of Fame in 1986.
