= Oscar Ward =

Indian boxer (born 1927)

Personal information
- Full name: William Alfred Oscar Ward
- Nationality: Indian
- Born: 15 October 1927; Jabalpur, British India

Sport
- Sport: Boxing

William Alfred Oscar Ward (born 15 October 1927) was an Indian boxer. He competed in the men's light heavyweight event at the 1952 Summer Olympics.
