= Antonios Modinos =

Greek sailor (born 1924)

Personal information
- Nationality: Greek
- Born: 1924

Sport
- Sport: Sailing

Antonios Modinos (born 1924) was a Greek sailor. He competed in the Finn event at the 1952 Summer Olympics.
