= Pyotr Gorelikov =

Russian sailor

Personal information
- Nationality: Russian
- Born: 16 December 1931; Ashgabat, Turkmenistan
- Died: 23 October 2017 (aged 85); St. Petersburg, Russia

Sport
- Sport: Sailing

Pyotr Gorelikov (16 December 1931 – 23 October 2017) was a Russian sailor. He competed in the Finn event at the 1952 Summer Olympics.
