= István Fazekas (boxer) =

Hungarian boxer

Personal information
- Nationality: Hungarian
- Born: 9 September 1929; Cibakháza, Hungary
- Died: 20 July 1979 (aged 49); Budapest, Hungary

Sport
- Sport: Boxing

István Fazekas (9 September 1929 – 20 July 1979) was a Hungarian boxer. He competed in the men's light heavyweight event at the 1952 Summer Olympics.
