= Gunnar Källström =

Finnish sailor

Personal information
- Nationality: Finnish
- Born: 26 June 1908; Turku, Finland
- Died: 23 January 1972 (aged 63); Helsinki, Finland

Sport
- Sport: Sailing

Gunnar Källström (26 June 1908 – 23 January 1972) was a Finnish sailor. He competed in the Finn event at the 1952 Summer Olympics.
