= Sailing at the 1952 Summer Olympics – Finn =

Sailing at the Olympics

Finn at the Games of the XV Olympiad
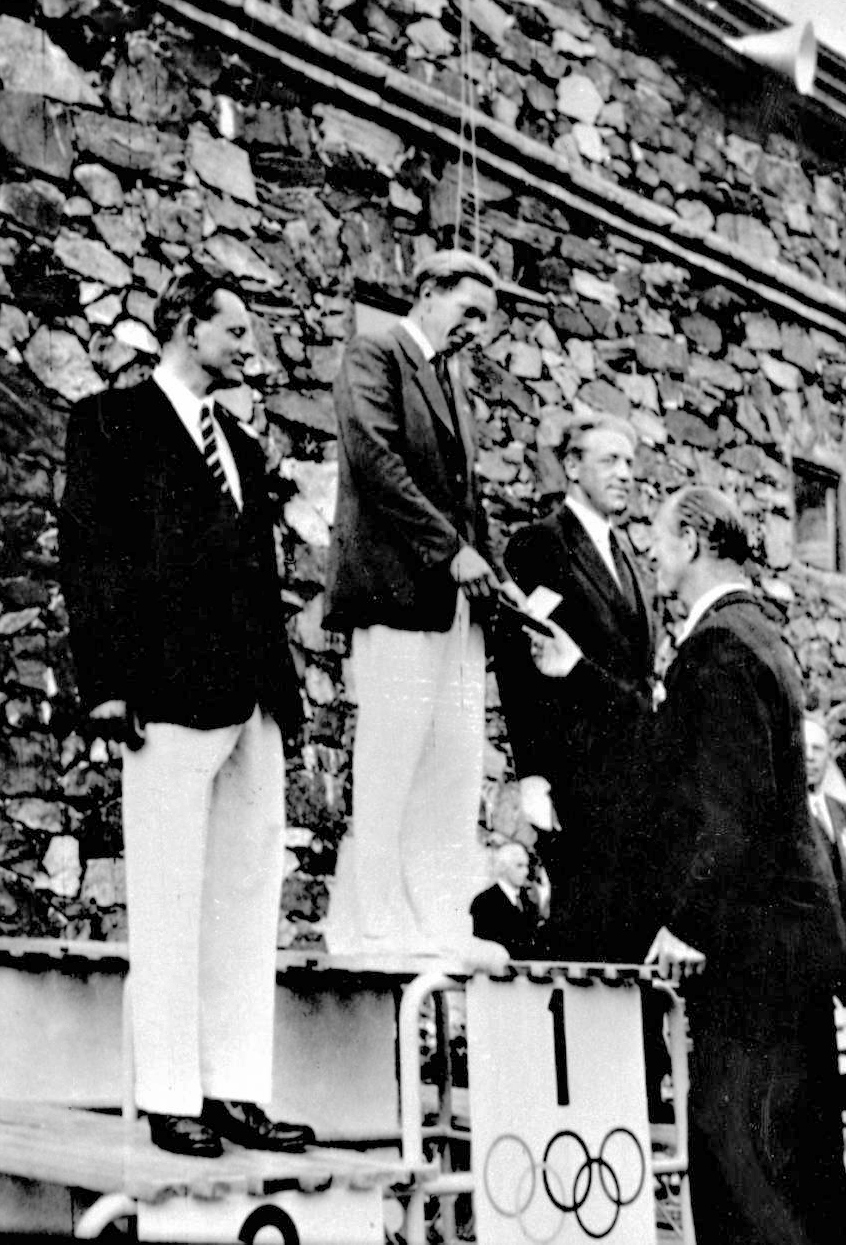
- Left-right: Currey, Elvstrøm and Sarby
- Venue: Harmaja
- Dates: 20–28 July
- Competitors: 28 from 28 nations
- Teams: 28

Medalists
1st place, gold medalist(s)		Paul Elvstrøm	Denmark
2nd place, silver medalist(s)		Charles Currey	Great Britain
3rd place, bronze medalist(s)		Rickard Sarby	Sweden

The Finn was a sailing event on the Sailing at the 1952 Summer Olympics program in Harmaja. Seven races were scheduled. 28 sailors, on 28 boats, from 28 nations competed.

== Results ==
Rank	Helmsman (Country)	Race I		Race II		Race III		Race IV		Race V		Race VI		Race VII		Total Points	Total -1
Rank	Helmsman (Country)	Rank	Points	Rank	Points	Rank	Points	Rank	Points	Rank	Points	Rank	Points	Rank	Points	Total Points	Total -1
1st place, gold medalist(s)	Paul Elvstrøm (DEN)	1	1548	~~5~~	~~849~~	1	1548	1	1548	3	1071	4	946	1	1548	9058	8209
2nd place, silver medalist(s)	Charles Currey (GBR)	9	594	~~10~~	~~548~~	8	645	8	645	1	1548	2	1247	6	770	5997	5449
3rd place, bronze medalist(s)	Rickard Sarby (SWE)	6	770	1	1548	4	946	6	770	10	548	12	469	~~14~~	~~402~~	5453	5051
4	Koos de Jong (NED)	4	946	2	1247	5	849	~~11~~	~~507~~	5	849	10	548	9	594	5540	5033
5	Wolfgang Erndl (AUT)	~~DSQ~~	~~0~~	4	946	9	594	16	344	4	946	15	372	3	1071	4273	4273
6	Morits Skaugen (NOR)	2	1247	19	269	~~DNF~~	~~0~~	18	293	15	372	1	1548	16	344	4073	4073
7	Adelchi Pelaschier (ITA)	5	849	6	770	2	1247	14	402	~~DSQ~~	~~0~~	11	507	18	293	4068	4068
8	Paul McLaughlin (CAN)	13	434	11	507	14	402	~~22~~	~~206~~	9	594	5	849	2	1247	4239	4033
9	Alfredo Bercht (BRA)	19	269	9	594	~~21~~	~~226~~	2	1247	13	434	17	318	5	849	3937	3711
10	Ramón Balcells Rodón (ESP)	8	645	~~DSQ~~	~~0~~	3	1071	26	133	2	1247	DSQ	0	10	548	3644	3644
11	Jacques Lebrun (FRA)	7	703	7	703	6	770	5	849	~~20~~	~~247~~	16	344	20	247	3863	3616
12	Pyotr Gorelikov (URS)	~~DNF~~	~~0~~	12	469	16	344	3	1071	8	645	3	1071	DSQ	0	3600	3600
13	Willy H.A. Pieper (SUI)	16	344	14	402	13	434	4	946	~~17~~	~~318~~	6	770	8	645	3859	3541
14	Kenneth Albury (BAH)	~~DNF~~	~~0~~	15	372	10	548	13	434	7	703	8	645	11	507	3209	3209
15	Werner Krogmann (GER)	3	1071	16	344	11	507	~~17~~	~~318~~	11	507	14	402	17	318	3467	3149
16	Hellmut Stauch (RSA)	12	469	3	1071	~~20~~	~~247~~	9	594	19	269	18	293	13	434	3377	3130
17	Mario Gentil Quina (POR)	18	293	~~DNF~~	~~0~~	17	318	7	703	6	770	7	703	DNF	0	2787	2787
18	Christian Nielsen (BEL)	17	318	13	434	~~22~~	~~206~~	12	469	12	469	9	594	12	469	2959	2753
19	Gunnar Källström (FIN)	15	372	8	645	19	269	15	372	21	226	~~25~~	~~150~~	7	703	2737	2587
20	Eugenio Lauz (URU)	10	548	17	318	12	469	~~25~~	~~150~~	14	402	13	434	21	226	2547	2397
21	Alfred Fred Joseph Delany (IRL)	14	402	23	186	15	372	19	269	~~26~~	~~133~~	26	133	4	946	2441	2308
22	Peter Attrill (AUS)	11	507	18	293	~~DNF~~	~~0~~	10	548	18	293	DNF	0	15	372	2013	2013
23	Karlo Bauman (YUG)	~~DSQ~~	~~0~~	24	168	7	703	20	247	16	344	20	247	DSQ	0	1709	1709
24	Jorge de Cárdenas (CUB)	~~20~~	~~247~~	22	206	18	293	27	117	23	186	19	269	19	269	1587	1470
25	Carlos Miguel Benn (ARG)	22	206	25	150	~~DNF~~	~~0~~	24	168	24	168	22	206	22	206	1104	1104
26	Antonios Modinos (GRE)	21	226	26	133	~~DNF~~	~~0~~	23	186	25	150	21	226	DNF	0	921	921
27	Keijiro Kaitoku (JPN)	23	186	20	247	~~DNF~~	~~0~~	DSQ	0	22	206	23	186	DNF	0	825	825
28	Edward Melaika (USA)	~~DNF~~	~~0~~	21	226	23	186	26	133	DNF	0	24	168	DSQ	0	713	713

DNF = Did Not Finish, DNS= Did Not Start, DSQ = Disqualified
= Male, = Female

=== Daily standings ===
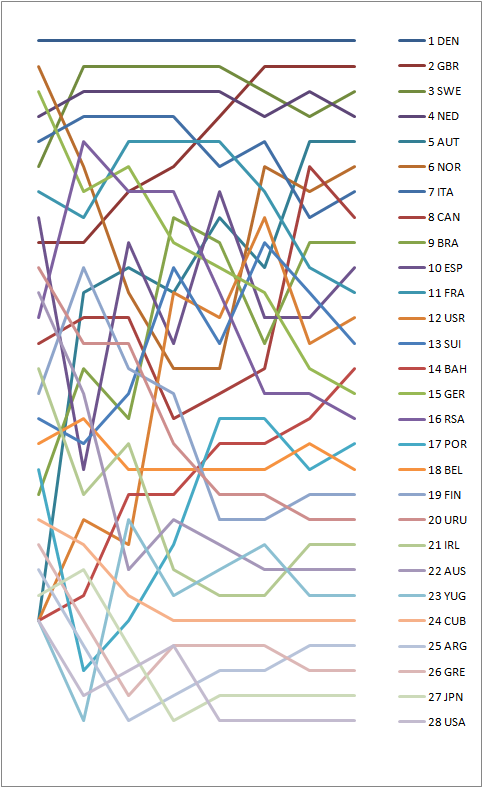
Graph showing the daily standings in the Finn during the 1952 Summer Olympics

== Conditions at Harmaja ==
Of the total of three race area's only two were needed during the Olympics in Harmaja. Each of the classes was using the same scoring system.

Date	Race	Sky	Wind direction	Wind speed (m/s)
20 July 1952	I	Grand yachting weather	SW	6-7
21 July 1952	II	Calm sea, later rain	SW	1-2 later 6-7
22 July 1952	III	Magnificent seas	SW	10
23 July 1952	IV		Shifty	3-4
26 July 1952	V	Rainy	SW	3-6
27 July 1952	VI		SW	4-6
28 July 1952	VII	Fine and sunny	Shifty	Light
