= Kristian Jensen (equestrian) =

Danish equestrian

Personal information
- Nationality: Danish
- Born: 24 March 1889; Norddjurs, Denmark
- Died: 21 October 1974 (aged 85)

Sport
- Sport: Equestrian

Kristian Jensen (24 March 1889 – 21 October 1974) was a Danish equestrian. He competed in the individual dressage event at the 1952 Summer Olympics.
