= Rolf Storm =

Swedish boxer

Personal information
- Nationality: Swedish
- Born: 5 August 1930; Norrköping, Sweden
- Died: 23 July 2000 (aged 69); Norrköping, Sweden

Sport
- Sport: Boxing

Rolf Storm (5 August 1930 – 23 July 2000) was a Swedish boxer. He competed in the men's light heavyweight event at the 1952 Summer Olympics.
