= Antonio Pacenza =

Argentine boxer

Medal record

Men's Boxing

Representing Argentina
Silver medal – second place	1952 Helsinki	Light Heavyweight

Antonio Pacenza (March 18, 1928–February 7, 1999) was an Argentine boxer who competed in the Light Heavyweight division during his career as an amateur.

== Amateur career ==
Pacenza was the Light Heavyweight Olympic Silver Medalist in 1952.

== Pro career ==
Pacenza turned pro in 1953 and spent most of his career fighting in Argentina. In late 1953 he was knocked out by Atilio Natalio Caraune, in a fight for the vacant Argentine (FAB) light heavyweight title, which was vacated by Amado Azar. Caraune relinquished the title without defending it on August 1, 1956. Pacenza retired in 1956, having won 14, lost 4, and drawn 1.
