= Valdemar de Silveira =

Brazilian weightlifter 1916–2001

Waldemar Vianna da Silveira
Personal information
- Nationality: Brazilian
- Born: 9 March 1916
- Died: 10 March 2001 (aged 85); Rio de Janeiro, Brazil

Sport
- Sport: Weightlifting

Waldemar Vianna da Silveira (9 March 1916 – 10 March 2001) was a Brazilian weightlifter. He competed in the men's heavyweight event at the 1952 Summer Olympics.
