= Frank Dooley =

American swimmer (1929–2022)

Frank M. Dooley
- Dooley in middle age during his career in law and politics

Personal information
- Full name: Francis Martin Dooley III
- Nickname: "Frank"
- National team: United States
- Born: March 21, 1929 New Haven, Connecticut, U.S.
- Died: November 14, 2022 (aged 93) Norfolk, Connecticut, U.S.
- Education: Ohio State University; University Connecticut Law (62)
- Spouse: Suzanne (m. 1958)
- Children: 3 daughters

Sport
- Sport: Swimming
- Strokes: Freestyle
- Club: New Haven Swim Club
- College team: Ohio State University
- Coach: Mike Peppe (Ohio State); Matthew Mann (Olympics)

Francis "Frank" Martin Dooley III (March 21, 1929 – November 14, 2022) was an American competition swimmer and world record holder who represented his native country at the 1952 Helsinki Olympics where he competed in the preliminary heats of the men's 4×200-meter freestyle relay. The U.S. 4x200 finals team later won a gold medal, which Dooley did not receive as he had swum only in the preliminaries and not as part of the finals team. After graduating as a business major at Ohio State, and the University of Connecticut School of Law in 1962, he had a law career of over forty years in Connecticut. He was active in Connecticut politics, chairing Norfolk, Virginia's Democratic Committee for 35 years, and in 1976 had a close but unsuccessful run for the Connecticut State Senate.

== Early life and family ==
Frank Martin Dooley III was born March 21, 1929 in New Haven, Connecticut to Colonel Frank Martin Dooley II and Marion Madden Dooley and began swimming in his hometown, on occasion with swimmers from Yale. Dooley's father Frank Dooley III was a strong motivator in his son's taking up swimming as a young man. As Frank II was a paraplegic who had suffered his injury from a gunshot wound in France in WWI, he provided swimming instructions to his son Frank III from his wheelchair. Despite his physical limitations, Colonel Dooley started his post-war career working in public relations for Southern New England phone company, and was a journalist for the New Haven Register. In later life, Frank's father was Editor of the Target, the newspaper of the Connecticut Veteran's Hospital, where he resided for fifteen years. Frank II remained active in local area civic affairs despite his confinement to a wheelchair, and advised several Connecticut communities on how to address issues in public school education. A strong supporter of the swimming community, Dooley's father taught swimming and lifesaving from his wheelchair at East Haven's Momauguin Beach for several years.

Frank III attended East Haven High School where he competed in swimming. A short distance freestyle specialist through most of his career, by 1946 he was the Connecticut Interscholastic Athletic Conference's title holder in the 220 and 100-yard freestyle events and defended his titles on March 8, 1947 at Yale. He swam the 220 in a time of 2:20.5 and the 100 in 57.3 on January 6, 1947 leading his team to an early season win against Meriden High School.

== Ohio State University ==
Dooley attended Ohio State University where he swam under Hall of Fame Head Coach Mike Peppe and was thrice a recipient of All American honors. Under Coach Peppe, Ohio State won NCAA Championships in 1949, 1950, and 1952, which included some of the years of Dooley's tenure with the swimming team. During summer breaks, Dooley trained and competed with the Ohio State Swim Club, also usually coached by Peppe, where he set world records in the 4x200 freestyle relay, and the 400 freestyle events. Dooley returned to Ohio State after attending the 1952 Olympics, and became a business administration graduate.

== World record ==
He set his best known world record in the 4x100 freestyle relay of 3:48.6 on June 29, 1948, in New Haven, Connecticut which held until 1951.

== 1952 Helsinki Olympics ==
Coach Matt Mann, '25

Managed by Head U.S. Olympic Swim Coach Mat Mann of the University of Michigan, Dooley swam for the gold medal-winning U.S. team in the qualifying heats of the men's 4×200-meter freestyle relay at the 1952 Helsinki Olympics where the US finals team later won the gold medal with a time of 8:31.1. He did not receive a medal, however, because under the Olympic swimming rules in effect in 1952, only relay swimmers who competed in the event final were medal-eligible. Japan won the silver medal with a time of 8:33.5, and France won the bronze with a time of 8:45.9. Dooley's 1952 Olympic teammate, native Hawaiian Ford Konno also attended Ohio State and trained under Mike Peppe.

=== Korean era military service ===
After college, Dooley served in the Korean War, reaching the rank of Lieutenant. For a year, he served in Japan and Korea, and was one of the First Marine Air Wing's legal officers.

During his law studies, Dooley met his wife Suzanne, marrying her at Norfolk, Connecticut's Immaculate Conception Church in 1958.

=== Legal career ===
After a stint working for Aetna Insurance, he graduated the University of Connecticut School of Law in 1962, and had a lengthy Connecticut-based career in the legal profession for over 50 years. He spent his first forty years practicing law in Connecticut's Lakeville and Hartford areas. Initially in private practice, he later became a partner in the firm of Shipman and Goodwin, after merging his own private accounts with the firm. Working with the Connecticut Bar Association, he served as a member of the House of Delegates and the Board of Governors, and was part of the Police Commission for the State of Connecticut. He worked with the State's Victim's Commission as their first State Commissioner. In 1976, he ran in a tight race for the Connecticut State Senate, but the incumbent received more votes. An important figure in State politics, for over thirty years, Frank Chaired Norfolk's Democratic Committee.

Dooley remained a member of the swimming community, competing and training with United States Masters Swimming, training and competing primarily with the Connecticut Masters's group and Connecticut-based clubs. At the age of 80, he received honors being named as one of US Master's Swimmers Top 10 List for his age group. From 1974-2010, from ages 45-81, Dooley had top ten age group times in individual events that included the 50 freestyle, the 50, 100 and 200 breaststroke, and the 200 and 400 freestyle. In relay swims from 1975-2007, from ages 46-78, he had top ten swims primarily in the 200 freestyle and medley relay events, and one in the 4x200 Freestyle relay at age 78 in 2007.

He died in Norfolk, Connecticut on November 14, 2022, at the age of 93, and was survived by his wife Suzanne, three daughters, and grandchildren. On Saturday, December 17th, a mass in his honor was held at 10:00 a.m. at Norfolk's St. Martin of Tours.

== See also ==
- List of Ohio State University people
- World record progression 4 × 100 metres freestyle relay
