= Ciubotaru v. Moldova =

2010 case decided by the European Court of Human Rights

Decided 27 April 2010
- Full case name: Ciubotaru v. Moldova
- Case: Application No. 27138/04
- President; Nicolas Bratza
- Judges: Lech Garlicki; Ljiljana Mijović; David Thór Björgvinsson; Ján Šikuta; Päivi Hirvelä; Mihai Poalelungi; Fatos Aracı

Legislation affecting
- Article 8 of the European Convention on Human Rights of the European Convention on Human Rights

Ciubotaru v. Moldova (application No. 27138/04) was a case decided by European Court of Human Rights in 2010. Mihai Ciubotaru sought to have his ethnicity changed from Moldovan to Romanian on his birth and marriage certificates, which Moldova refused. The Court found that Moldova's procedure for changing ethnicity of record violated Article 8 (right to private life) of the European Convention on Human Rights.

== Background ==
In 2002, when applying to have his old Soviet identity card replaced with a Moldovan one, Mihai Ciubotaru submitted that his ethnicity was Romanian. As he was told that his application would not be accepted unless he indicated Moldovan ethnicity, as in his and his parents' Soviet documents, he complied.

Afterwards he requested the relevant State authority to change his ethnic identity entry from "Moldovan" to "Romanian". His request was refused with the argument that since his parents had not been recorded as ethnic Romanians in their birth and marriage certificates, it was impossible for him to be recorded as an ethnic Romanian. He was advised to search the archives for traces of Romanian origin of his ancestors. Appeals to domestic courts were refused.

== Opinion of the Court ==
The Court found for Ciubotaru. The Court explained that it understood that authorities should be able to refuse a claim to change ethnicity of record when the claim is based purely on unsubstantiated subjective grounds. However, Moldova's legal requirements created insurmountable barriers on an individual wishing to record an ethnicity other than the ethnicity that Soviet authorities defined for the individual's parents. The Court also found that Ciubotaru's claim was based on more than merely subjective grounds, as Ciubotaru could produce objectively verifiable links with Romanian ethnic groups. Evidence such as language, name, and empathy cannot be relied on under Moldovan law in force.

The Court concluded, that the procedure of changing ethnicity record violated Article 8 (right to private life) of the European Convention on Human Rights, and ordered Moldova to pay the applicant €5,000.

== Concurrence ==
Judge Mijović filed a concurring opinion, pointing that I consider self-identification primarily as a matter of personal perception rather than a matter based on objective grounds, and that is why I do not share the Chamber's reasoning in the judgment.
