= Christian Nielsen (Belgian sailor) =

Belgian sailor (born 1932)

Personal information
- Full name: Christian Antoine Marie Pierre Nielsen
- Nationality: Belgian
- Born: 23 June 1932; Mechelen, Belgium

Sport
- Sport: Sailing

Christian Nielsen (born 23 June 1932) is a Belgian sailor. He competed in the Finn event at the 1952 Summer Olympics.
