= Tadeusz Grzelak =

Polish boxer

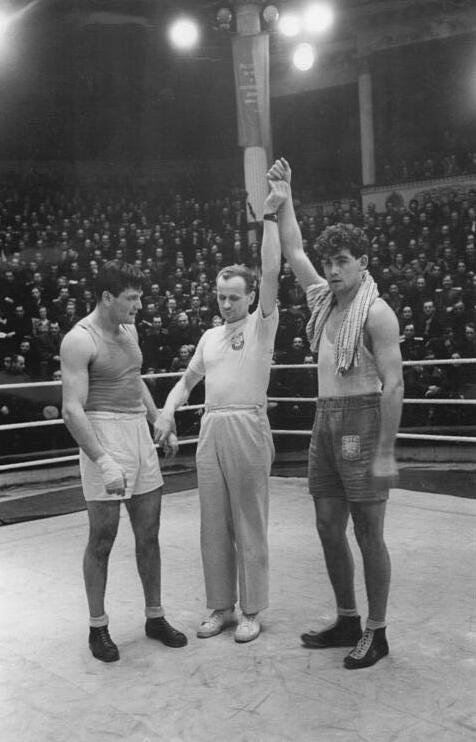
- Tadeusz Grzelak in 1952

Personal information
- Nationality: Polish
- Born: 24 December 1929 Pinsk, Poland
- Died: 14 October 1996 (aged 66) Konin, Poland
- Height: 183 cm (6 ft 0 in)
- Weight: 80 kg (176 lb)

Sport
- Sport: Boxing
Medal record
Men's Boxing
Representing Poland
European Amateur Championships
Silver medal – second place	1953 Warsaw	Light Heavyweight

Tadeusz Grzelak (24 December 1929 – 14 October 1996) was a Polish boxer. He competed in the men's light heavyweight event at the 1952 Summer Olympics.
