= Ernesto Silva (equestrian) =

Chilean equestrian

Personal information
- Nationality: Chilean
- Born: 4 May 1921

Sport
- Sport: Equestrian
Medal record
Equestrian
Representing Chile
Pan American Games
Gold medal – first place	1951 Buenos Aires	Team dressage

Ernesto Silva (born 4 May 1921, date of death unknown) was a Chilean equestrian. He competed in two events at the 1952 Summer Olympics.
