= Dumitru Ciobotaru =

Romanian boxer

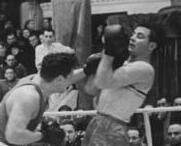
- Ciobotaru (right)

Personal information
- Nationality: Romanian
- Born: 8 January 1927 Galați, Romania
- Died: 2007 (aged 79–80)

Sport
- Sport: Boxing

Dumitru Ciobotaru (8 January 1927 – 2007) was a Romanian boxer. He competed in the men's light heavyweight event at the 1952 Summer Olympics.
