= Anatoly Perov =

Russian boxer (1926–2001)

Personal information
- Born: 12 August 1926 Moscow, Russian SFSR, Soviet Union
- Died: 22 September 2001 (aged 75) Moscow, Russia

Sport
- Sport: Boxing
- Club: Trudovye Rezervy
Medal record
Representing Soviet Union
Olympic Games
Bronze medal – third place	1952 Helsinki	-81 kg

Anatoly Vasilyevich Perov (Russian: Анатолий Васильевич Перов, 12 August 1926 – 22 September 2001) was a Russian light-heavyweight boxer. In 1952 he won his only Soviet title, as well as an Olympic bronze medal. He retired in 1955 with a record of 111 wins out of 130 bouts.
