= Karl Kistner =

German boxer (1929–2008)

Personal information
- Nationality: German
- Born: 19 June 1929; Nuremberg, Germany
- Died: 2008 (aged 78–79)

Sport
- Sport: Boxing

Karl Kistner (19 June 1929 – 2008) was a German boxer. He competed in the men's light heavyweight event at the 1952 Summer Olympics. Kistner died in 2008.
