= Equestrian events at the 1951 Pan American Games =

Equestrian at the 1951 Pan American Games in Buenos Aires, Argentina.

== Medal summary ==
=== Medal table ===
Rank	Nation	Gold	Silver	Bronze	Total
1	Chile	4	2	2	8
2	Argentina	2	4	1	7
3	Mexico	0	0	1	1
Totals (3 entries)		6	6	4	16

=== Events ===
Event	Gold	Silver	Bronze
Individual dressage	José Larraín; Chile	Héctor Clavel; Chile	Justo Iturralde; Argentina
Team dressage	Chile	Argentina	Unknown
Individual jumping	Alberto Larraguibel; Chile	Carlos César Delía; Argentina	Ricardo Echeverría; Chile
Team jumping	Chile	Argentina	Mexico
Individual Three-Day eventing	Julio César Sagasta; Argentina	Fernando Urdapilleta; Argentina	Hernán Vigil; Chile
Team Three-Day eventing	Argentina	Chile	Unknown
