= Claude Arnaiz =

French boxer

Personal information
- Nationality: French
- Born: 1 July 1931; Angoulême, France
- Died: 22 November 2009 (aged 78)

Sport
- Sport: Boxing

Claude Arnaiz (1 July 1931 – 22 November 2009) was a French boxer. He competed in the men's light heavyweight event at the 1952 Summer Olympics.
