= Keijiro Kaitoku =

Japanese sailor

Personal information
- Nationality: Japanese
- Born: 7 December 1929; Nishinomiya, Japan
- Died: 1997 (aged 67–68)

Sport
- Sport: Sailing

Keijiro Kaitoku (7 December 1929 – 1997) was a Japanese sailor. He competed in the Finn event at the 1952 Summer Olympics.
