= Fritz Thiedemann =

German equestrian

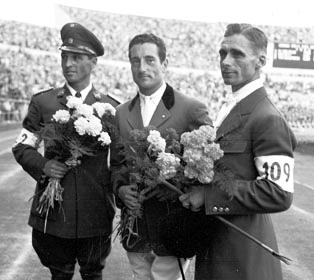
- Thiedemann (right) at the 1952 Olympics

Personal information
- Born: 3 March 1918 Weddinghusen, Schleswig-Holstein, German Empire
- Died: 8 January 2000 (aged 81) Heide, Germany
- Height: 166 cm (5 ft 5 in)
- Weight: 64 kg (141 lb)

Sport
- Sport: Horse riding
- Event: Show jumping
- Club: Reiterverein Ditmarsia, Heide; RuFV Ziethen, Elmshorn
Medal record
Representing Germany
Olympic Games
Gold medal – first place	1956 Stockholm	Team jumping
Gold medal – first place	1960 Rome	Team jumping
Bronze medal – third place	1952 Helsinki	Team dressage
Bronze medal – third place	1952 Helsinki	Individual jumping
World Championships
Silver medal – second place	1953 Paris	Individual jumping
Bronze medal – third place	1956 Aachen	Individual jumping
European Championships
Gold medal – first place	1958 Aachen	Individual jumping
Bronze medal – third place	1959 Paris	Individual jumping

Fritz Thiedemann (German pronunciation: [fʁɪt͡s ˈtiːdəˌman]; 3 March 1918 – 8 January 2000) was a German equestrian, considered to be one of the greatest show jumpers of his time.

== Biography ==
Thiedemann was born as the son of a farmer. His riding talents became clear at a young age, but he could not display them internationally until after World War II. During the war, Theidemann commanded a cavalry unit and was captured and interned at a Russian prison camp by war's end.

At the 1952 Olympics in Helsinki, Thiedemann won medals in two equestrian disciplines, a feat since unequalled. He placed third in the dressage team event, and won another bronze medal in the individual jumping contest with his favourite horse Meteor, with which he would win all major prizes in his career.

The following year, Thiedemann won a jumping silver at the World Championships in Paris. Winning another medal (bronze) in that event in 1956 in Aachen. That same year, he won a gold medal with the United Team of Germany in the 1956 Olympics in Stockholm, while just missing out on an individual medal with a fourth position.

At the 1958 European Championships in Aachen, he took the title. Thiedemann was the flag-bearer of the United Team of Germany (composed of both East and West German athletes) at the 1960 Olympics in Rome. The United Team of Germany successfully defended their jumping title, Thiedemann winning his fourth Olympic medal. In addition, he placed 6th in the individual jumping competition.

Thiedemann died in his birthplace Heide aged 81. The Thiedemann rein is named after him.

Awards and achievements
Preceded by (Germany) Manfred Germar	German Sportsman of the Year; 1958	Succeeded by (Germany) Martin Lauer
