= Norvel Lee =

American Olympic boxer and Tuskegee Airman (1924–1992)

Personal information
- Born: September 22, 1924 Eagle Rock, Virginia, U.S.
- Died: August 19, 1992 (aged 67) Bethesda, Maryland, U.S.
Medal record
Men's boxing
Representing the United States
Olympic Games
| Gold medal – first place | 1952 Helsinki | Light heavyweight |
Pan American Games
| Bronze medal – third place | 1951 Buenos Aires | Heavyweight |
| Bronze medal – third place | 1955 Mexico City | Heavyweight |

Norvel L. R. Lee (September 22, 1924 – August 19, 1992) was an amateur boxer, Tuskegee Airman, WWII veteran, scholar, educator, field grade officer in the US Army Reserve, and youth mentor in the greater Washington D.C. area. He won the light heavyweight gold medal in boxing at the Helsinki Olympic Games in 1952 and was also awarded the Val Barker Trophy. On September 17, 2022, the Commonwealth of Virginia unveiled a historical marker honoring Lee's accomplishments. The highway near Lee's childhood home was designated the Norvel LaFallette Ray Lee Memorial Highway.

== Early life ==
Norvel LaFollette Ray Lee was born on September 22, 1924, to James Jackson ("Jack") Lee and his wife, George Anna Ray in the small town of Eagle Rock in Botetourt County, Virginia. He had three siblings; a sister, Edna Mae (1926), and two brothers, James Fitzhugh (1928) and George Edward (1936); George had a twin brother that died during childbirth. Norvel was educated in the segregated public schools of Virginia, graduating high school from the Academy Hill School for Negroes in Fincastle, Virginia. He was baptized and he worshipped at the Rising Mount Zion Baptist Church in Gala, Virginia.

== Military service ==
In 1943, Norvel Lee was selected for flight training at the Tuskegee flight training program. He earned his wings but was not assigned a squadron because of a stammer. He served on a ground crew in the South Pacific at the end of WWII.

Later, while attending Howard University he enrolled in the ROTC program. Upon graduation he was commissioned an Air Force Reserve Officer. He was promoted several times from 2nd Lieutenant, retiring at the rank of Lieutenant Colonel. He served with the 2617 Air Service Center, Washington, D.C., 459th Military Airlift Wing, Andrews Air Force Base, Washington D.C.; and the 14th Reserve/DW, Dobbins, Georgia. Upon retiring, he enlisted and was assigned to the 113th Tactical Fighter Wing, District of Columbia Air National Guard, Andrews Air Force Base.

== Education ==
Lee received a Bachelor of Science Degree in Physical Education from Howard University, Master of Arts Degree in Adult Education from Federal City College (now known as the University of the District of Columbia) in 1969, and an ABD from Catholic University, all located in Washington, D.C.

== Boxing career ==
Norvel Lee began his boxing career while enrolled at Howard University. In 1948 he was on the U.S. Olympic Boxing Team for the London Olympics. In 1949 and 1950, he won the Central Division Intercollegiate Athletic Association championship. In 1950 and 1951, he won the National AAU crown, the New York City Golden Gloves championship, and the Chicago Golden Gloves title. In 1951, he also participated in the Pan American Games in Argentina.

In 1952 at the 15th Olympiad in Helsinki, Finland he won the gold medal for the light-heavyweight class. He was awarded the Val Barker Trophy as the outstanding boxer at the 1952 Olympic Games. The US team won five boxing gold medals in the Helsinki Games, including one for seventeen-year-old Floyd Patterson who Lee mentored before and during the games. He didn't box again until the 1955 Pan Games in Mexico City where he won the bronze medal. After repeated offers, he refused to box professionally and retired with a 100-5 amateur record.

Lee maintained involvement in various administrative and policy-making boxing organizations, including serving as a member of the District of Columbia Boxing Commission for ten years; Chairman of the commission for six years; and member of the executive board of the World Boxing Association for four years. He was an inductee and past president of the D.C. Boxing Hall of Fame, and Chief Judge of, D.C. Boxing Commission. In 1964 he was invited to Gambia and Mali in Africa as a goodwill ambassador to teach boxing for two months in summer training programs.

== Civil rights case ==
In 1948, while returning from the 1948 Olympics to his hometown of Eagle Rock, he was arrested for violating the Jim Crow laws and refusing to move from his seat in the white-only section of a passenger train car; the NAACP posted his bail. He was found guilty and ordered to pay a fine of $5. He appealed to the Circuit Court of Allegheny County and lost. He was found guilty and fined $25. He appealed the case again and went before the Virginia State Supreme Court [Norvell Lee v. Commonwealth of Virginia, Record 3558 (1949)] and the judgment of the court was overturned, resulting in him winning the landmark case.

== Personal life ==
On June 22, 1951, Norvel married Leslie Ellen Jackson of Leesburg, Virginia. They had two daughters, Deborah Louise in 1954 and Denise Kay in 1955. His professional career began as a teacher and a counselor for the Department of Justice, Bureau of Prisons, and expanded to various administrative and managerial positions, including Director of Education for the D.C. Youth Center, D.C. Department of Corrections; Director of Training, D.C. Department of Public Welfare - Title V Training Program; Deputy Project Director, The Institute of Computer Technology; Director of Counseling Education, The Federal City College; Coordinator of Adult and Community Education, Baltimore City Department of Education where he served as Chairman of the Mayor's Manpower Advisory Council, Assistant Superintendent of Personnel, Assistant Superintendent of Adult and Community Education, and Coordinator; Manpower Skills Center. In addition, Lee was Director of Equal Employment Opportunity, Federal Emergency Management Agency; and Radiological Protection Officer and Emergency Operations Officer for the D.C. Office of Emergency Preparedness.

== Later years and death ==
In 1991, Norvel retired after 36 years of government service. Throughout his years he was involved in various activities and received many professional and civic honors which included: President, Lamond Riggs Citizens Association; President, Parents Preschool Council of the District of Columbia; President, National Capital Child Day Care Association; Region II Vice President, American Society of Professional Emergency Planners; Vice President, National Skills Center Directors Association; President, Diplomat Cab Association; and a member of the American Society of Public Administrators. He was listed in "Who's Who Among Black Americans".

On August 19, 1992, he died from pancreatic cancer at the Bethesda Naval Medical Center in Maryland surrounded by his two daughters, four grandchildren, and a host of friends and family.

== Posthumous recognition ==
On February 24, 2022, the Virginia General Assembly unanimously designated a portion of Route 220 in Botetourt County as the Norvel LaFallette Ray Lee Memorial Highway in Lee's honor. On September 17, 2022, a historical marker was unveiled along the highway near Lee's childhood home recognizing his contributions as a military officer, civil rights pioneer, boxer, and educator.

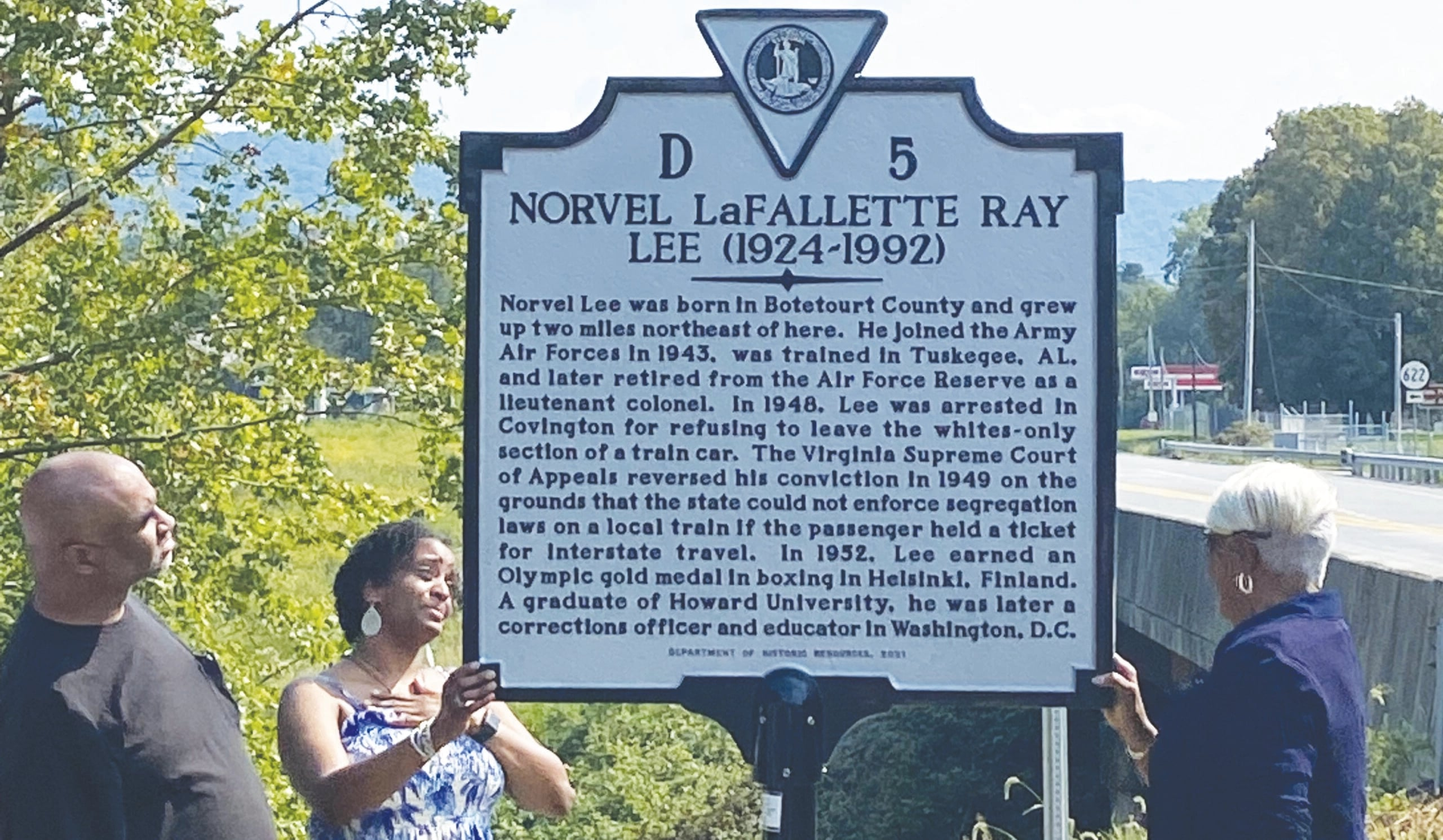
Norvel Lee historical marker unveiling.

== Bibliography ==
- Kenneth F. (2020). Norvel: An American Hero. ISBN 978-1-7344807-0-2
