= Edward Melaika =

American sailor

Personal information
- Nationality: American
- Born: June 17, 1931 (age 95)

Sport
- Sport: Sailing

Edward Melaika (born June 17, 1931) is an American sailor. He competed in the Finn event at the 1952 Summer Olympics.
