= James Bradford (weightlifter) =

American weightlifter (1928–2013)

Jim Bradford
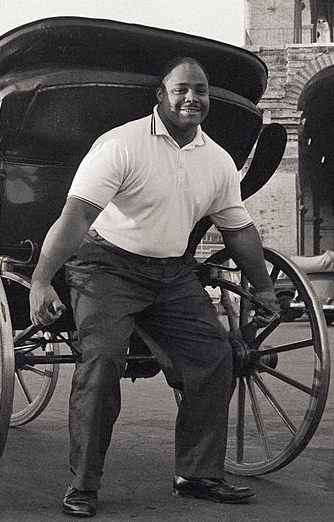
- James Bradford at the 1960 Olympics

Personal information
- Full name: James Edward Bradford
- Born: November 1, 1928 Washington, D.C.
- Died: September 13, 2013 (aged 84) Silver Spring, Maryland
- Height: 6 ft 0 in (1.83 m)
- Weight: 110–123 kg (243–271 lb)

Sport
- Country: United States
- Sport: Weightlifting
Medal record
Representing the United States
Olympic Games
Silver medal – second place	1952 Helsinki	Heavyweight
Silver medal – second place	1960 Rome	Heavyweight
World Championships
Silver medal – second place	1951 Milan	+90 kg
Silver medal – second place	1954 Vienna	+90 kg
Silver medal – second place	1955 Munich	+90 kg
Silver medal – second place	1959 Warsaw	+90 kg

James Edward "Jim" Bradford (November 1, 1928 – September 13, 2013) was an American heavyweight weightlifter. He competed at two Olympics (1952 and 1960) and four world championships (1951, 1954, 1955 and 1959) and won silver medals on all occasions.

== Career ==
Bradford won the AAU heavyweight titles in 1960 and 1961. Ten years prior, he won the AAU Junior Championship in 1950. To his own misfortune, Bradford had to compete against the greatest lifters of all time. At the 1951 World Championships, and 1952 Olympics he placed second to John Davis, in 1954 and 1955 he placed second to Norb Schemansky, and Paul Anderson respectively, and at the 1959 World Championships and 1960 Olympics to Yury Vlasov.

Before 1956 Bradford completed his army service. Although he qualified for the 1956 Olympics he chose to stay at home with his pregnant wife.

Bradford graduated from Armstrong High School in 1946 and from Howard University in 1974. He then received a master's degree in library science from University of the District of Columbia in 1976, and a master's degree in management and supervision from a Washington branch of Central Michigan University in 1979. For many years he worked as a bookbinder and researcher at the Library of Congress in Washington; he also served one term as chapter president of the American Federation of State, County and Municipal Employees.

Bradford died of congestive heart failure, aged 84. He was survived by his wife of 60 years, Grace Robertson Bradford, and three children, James E. Bradford Jr., Sharleen B. Kavetski and Jo Bradford.

The Bradford Special also known as the Bradford press, originally an assistance exercise for clean and press and favorite of Bradford, was named after him.
