= Ida von Nagel =

German equestrian (1917–1971)

Medal record

Equestrian

Representing Germany

Olympic Games
Bronze medal – third place	1952 Helsinki	Team dressage

Ida von Nagel (15 May 1917 – 29 August 1971) was a German equestrian and Olympic medalist. She won a bronze medal in dressage at the 1952 Summer Olympics in Helsinki.
