= Arthur McCashin =

American equestrian

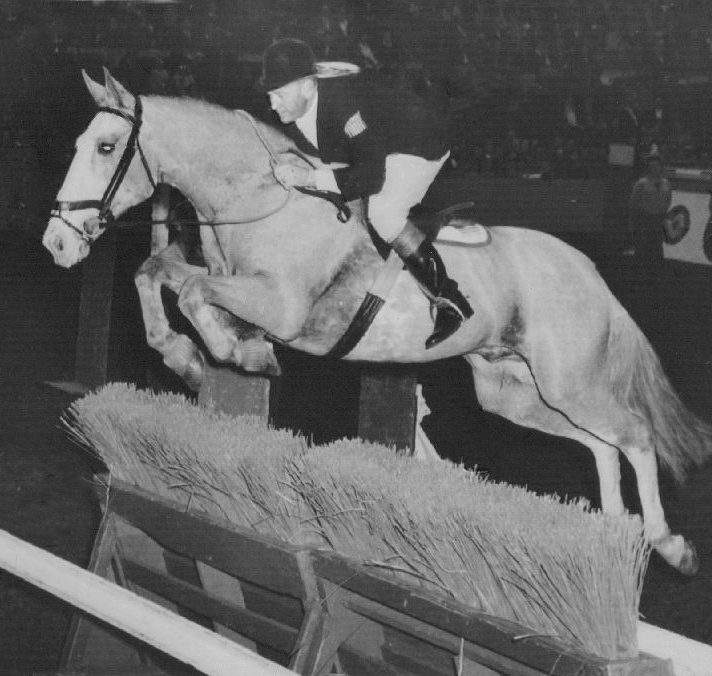
- McCashin in 1954

Personal information
- Born: 5 May 1909 Larne, Northern Ireland
- Died: 24 September 1988 (aged 79) Falls Church, Virginia, U.S.

Sport
- Sport: Equestrianism
Medal record
Representing United States
Olympic Games
Bronze medal – third place	1952 Helsinki	Team jumping

Arthur John McCashin (5 May 1909 – 24 September 1988) was an American equestrian. He won a bronze medal in team show jumping at the 1952 Olympics and placed 12th individually. After retiring from competitions he became a riding course designer, and for many years planned the circuit at the New York's National Horse Show. During World War II he served as a pilot in a supply service for the armed forces.
