= Héctor Clavel =

Chilean equestrian

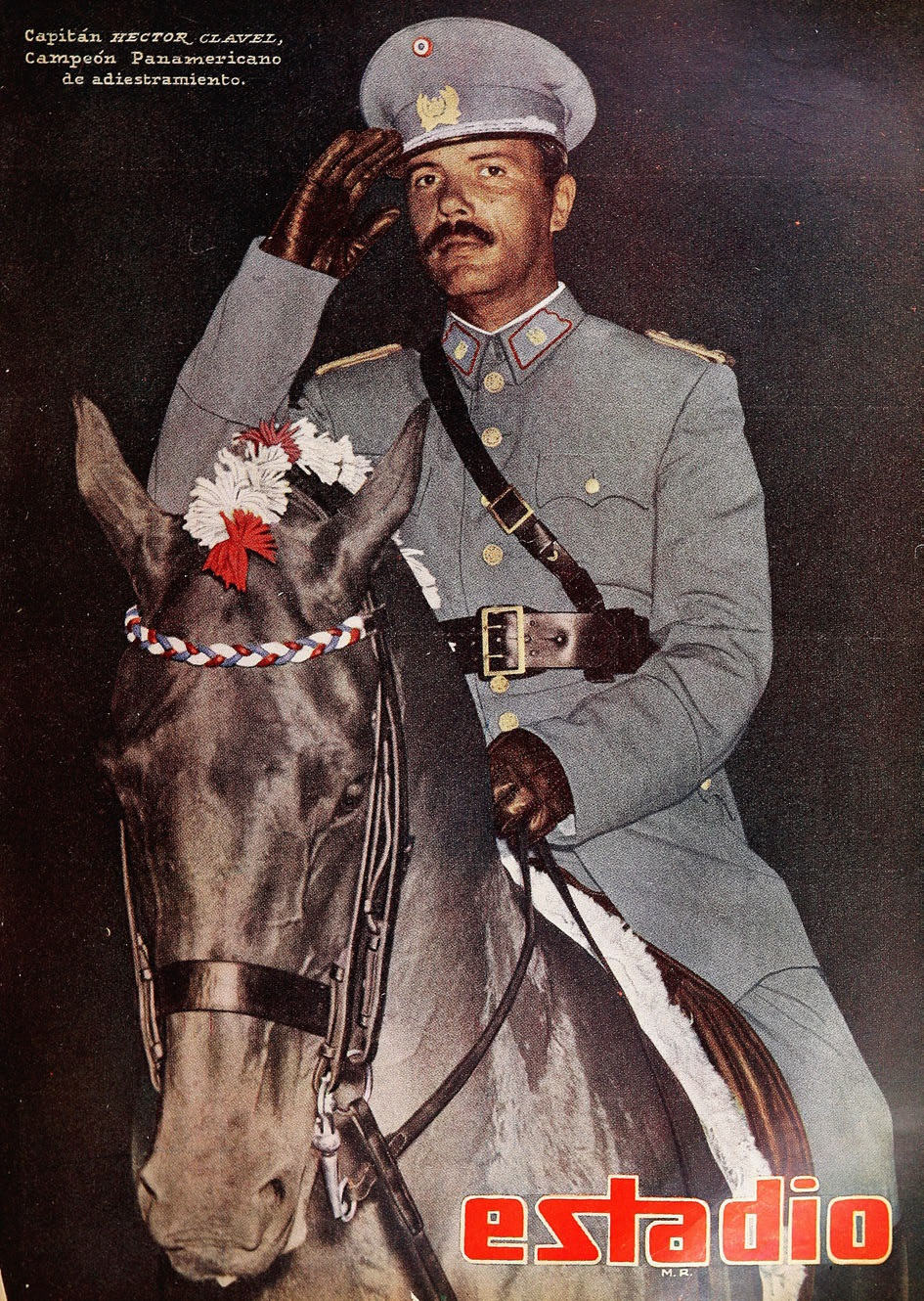
- Clavel in 1955

Personal information
- Full name: Luis Héctor Clavel Gertner
- Nationality: Chilean
- Born: 17 September 1920
- Died: 26 April 1982 (aged 61)

Sport
- Sport: Equestrian
Medal record
Equestrian
Representing Chile
Pan American Games
Gold medal – first place	1951 Buenos Aires	Team dressage
Gold medal – first place	1955 Mexico City	Individual dressage
Silver medal – second place	1951 Buenos Aires	Individual dressage
Bronze medal – third place	1963 São Paulo	Individual dressage

Luis Héctor Clavel Gertner (Note: In this Spanish name, the first or paternal surname is Clavel and the second or maternal family name is Gertner.) (17 September 1920 – 26 April 1982) was a Chilean equestrian. He competed in two events at the 1952 Summer Olympics.
