= José Larraín =

Chilean equestrian (1917–1972)

Personal information
- Full name: José Gonzalo Larraín Cuevas
- Born: 25 March 1917 Santiago, Chile
- Died: 29 January 1972 (aged 54)

Sport
- Sport: Equestrian
Medal record
Equestrian
Representing Chile
Pan American Games
Gold medal – first place	1951 Buenos Aires	Individual dressage
Gold medal – first place	1951 Buenos Aires	Team dressage
Gold medal – first place	1959 Chicago	Team dressage
Bronze medal – third place	1955 Mexico City	Individual dressage

José Larraín (25 March 1917 – 29 January 1972) was a Chilean equestrian. He competed in two events at the 1952 Summer Olympics.
