= Hartmann Pauly =

American equestrian

Personal information
- Nationality: American
- Born: August 5, 1893 Offenbach am Main, Germany
- Died: August 19, 1966 (aged 73) Mount Angel, Oregon, United States

Sport
- Sport: Equestrian

Hartmann Pauly (August 5, 1893 – August 19, 1966) was an American equestrian. He competed in two events at the 1952 Summer Olympics.
