= Marjorie Haines =

American equestrian

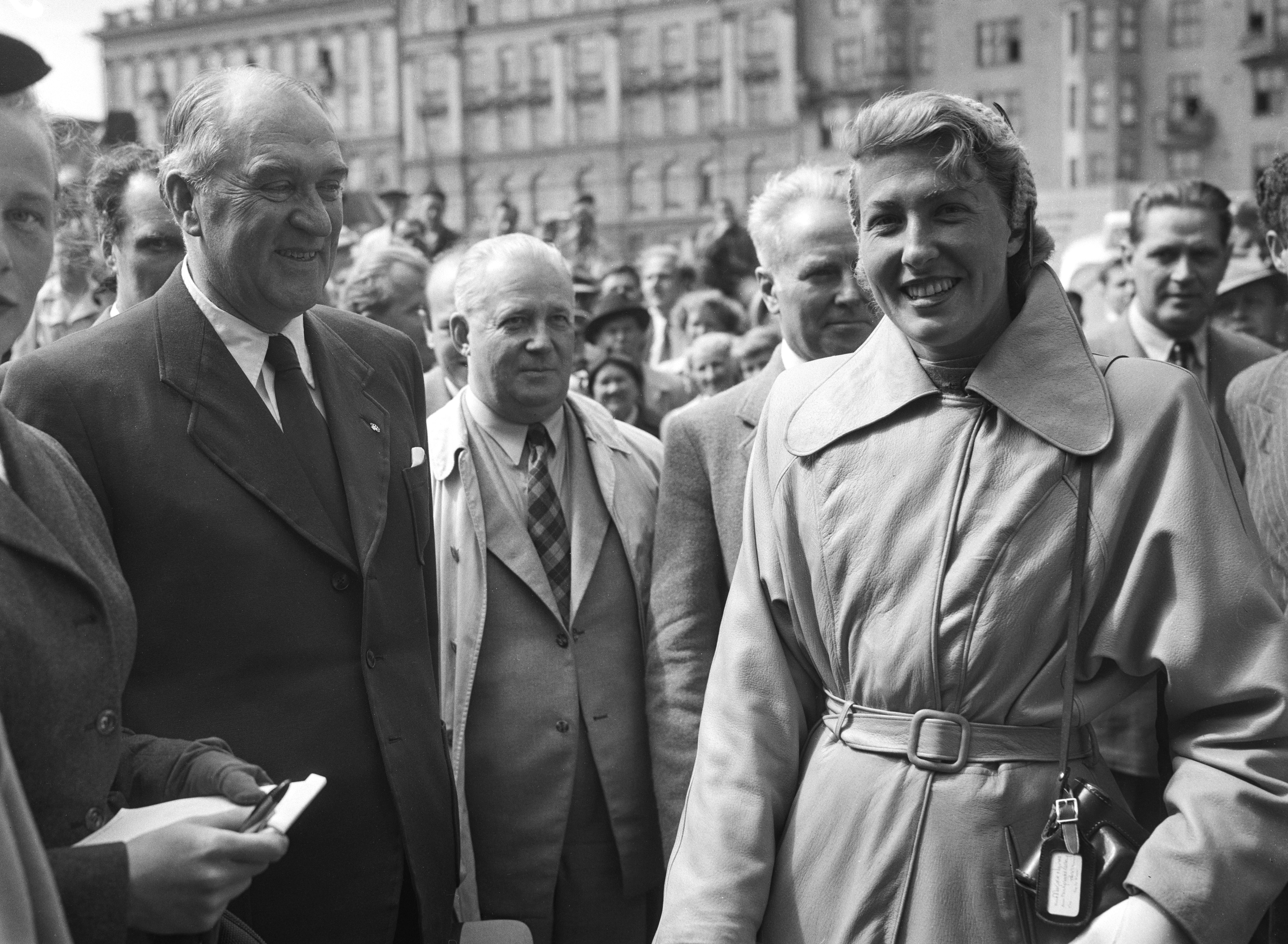
- Marjorie Haines during the 1952 Summer Olympics

Personal information
- Nationality: American
- Born: November 18, 1928; Gwynedd Valley, Pennsylvania, United States
- Died: June 7, 2014 (aged 85); King Of Prussia, Pennsylvania, United States

Sport
- Sport: Equestrian

Marjorie Haines (November 18, 1928 – June 7, 2014) was an American equestrian. She competed in two events at the 1952 Summer Olympics.
