= Baldwin Girls' High School =

Coordinates: 12°57′51″N 77°36′02″E

Location
- 90, Richmond Road, Bangalore, Karnataka; India

Information
- Type: Private school, boarding school
- Motto: Loyalty and Service
- Religious affiliation: Methodist
- Established: 1880; 146 years ago
- Founders: Missionaries of The Methodist Episcopal Church; Rev. J. Gordon, Rev. R. Firth
- Principal: Mrs Asha M Das.
- Staff: 220 teachers and over 120 support staff
- Gender: Girls
- Enrolment: 5750 approx.
- Campus size: 9.5 acres (38,000 m^{2})
- Houses: Benthein, Delima, Fisher, Laura Gill, Stephen, Watson, Weston
- Colours: Blue and white
- Website: https://baldwingirls.edu.in/

Baldwin Girls' High School (BGHS), founded in 1880, is an all-girls Methodist school and one of the oldest in Bangalore, India. The school follows the Indian Certificate of Secondary Education syllabus and has classes from pre-nursery up to the tenth grade. The school has an enrollment of more than 5000 students and prepares them for the ICSE examinations in the tenth grade. Baldwin Girls' High School, a member of the Baldwin group of Institutions, is run by the Methodist Church in India under the Chairmanship of Bishop of the South India Regional Conference of the Methodist Church in India.

The Baldwin Women's Degree College also shares the same campus. Baldwin Boys' High School is the brother school and is a five-minute walk away from Richmond Road.

The school has an Opportunity School for specially gifted children. Baldwin Opportunity School is an institution in the field of Special Education, founded by Miss Anne Tillou, an American missionary, in 1964. It is an extension of the Baldwin Girls' High School and a Unit of Baldwin Methodist Education Society. The School is for children who are Intellectually Challenged in mild and moderate categories. The classes are divided into Pre-Primary, Primary, Intermediate, Senior I, Senior II, Learning Lab, Home Maker's Class and Pre-Vocational Unit.

== History ==
The school was established by the Methodist Episcopal Church, with a monetary grant from John Baldwin in Ohio, United States. It was known as the Episcopal Methodist School and managed by a board of ICSE council. The school followed an ISC Board (11th and 12th Grade) for five years from 1997 to 2002, but this was discontinued due to the lack of a student body and was replaced by a PUC college. The former principal of the school, Dr S.L Kashiram was the first Indian who was the recipient of the prestigious Derozio Awards awarded by the ICSE council.

== Extracurricular activities ==
The school was the first to open a swimming pool in Bangalore. It had the first all-girls gymnastic team back in the 1960s. In 2010, the Baldwin choir came in second place in the Jingle Jam conducted by Radio Indigo out of 500 schools. The choir of Baldwins has consistently been winning in the annual Basel Mission conducted at the Bangalore Town Hall. The school has the first ever all-female band to be formed in Bangalore. They are the only all-female band to have performed at Christmas for the Basel Mission. The school basketball team won the Nationals in 2010 and 2011. The school's Robotics team represented India at the Robocup Junior On Stage 2016 Leipzig. The school also takes part in various MUNs and other cultural and literary fests.

=== Commencement Exercise and the Baccalaureate Service ===
The Commencement exercises are carried out every year in January when the graduating students of class X walk up the aisle in traditional white sarees. Deserving graduates are given prestigious awards instituted by various donors. The mantle of responsibility (school banner) is handed over to their juniors and then the Principal and the guests invite them to participate in a solemn, meaningful candle lighting ceremony, as they take the oath to carry their light, ignited by their Alma Mater, into the dark world to shine and reach out to many in whatever situation they are placed in life.

The Baccalaureate service is organized specifically for the School leaving Class (Std. X), in the Richmond Town Methodist Church at which powerful spiritual leaders remind them of values learnt, advise the students and invoke God's blessing on them before they step out into the world, even as they leave the portals of their Alma Mater. Parents are also invited to attend this sacred service.

== Notable alumni ==
- Akshata Murthy, Director Catamaran Ventures (Wife of the PM of the united kingdom)
- Aindrita Ray, actress
- Andaleeb Wajid, author
- Christine Brown, athlete, part of the relay team that won the first women's gold for India in the Asian Games in 1954
- Meghana Raj, actress
- Nutan, actress
- Kriti Kharbanda, actress
- Shobhana Samarth, actress
- Shubra Aiyappa, model and actress
- Sapthami Gowda, actress

== Houses ==
The house system was introduced in 1932. The idea of house points for inter-house competitions came into being in 1937 and the March Past was instituted in 1940. In 1932, Benthien, Fisher, Stephen and Watson Houses were formed. In 1958, Weston House was added on. Delima House was established in 1963 and Laura Gill House was introduced in 1969.

Each house has been named after former Principals, benefactors and friends of the school, who contributed generously to its growth in the early years.

Miss Elizabeth Benthien was the Principal of the school from 1907 to 1909. "Bend to Nothing" is the motto of this house with its emerald green flag.

Miss Edith De Lima did a double stint as Principal (1955–56 and 1957–59). "Forward Ever Backward Never" is the motto of this house.

Miss Fannie Fisher donated generously to the school in 1910. "Persevere to the End" is the motto inscribed on this purple flag.

Miss Grace Stephen, another friend of Baldwins, after whom Stephen house is named, supported the school through gifts and valuable advice in 1932. " Step up, Stephen" is the motto of this house.

Miss Laura Gill, devoted to the progress of the school, stayed on in the school till her death in the early 1960s. "To Greater Heights" is the motto of this house.

Miss Ella Watson contributed towards the building "Watson Hall", which housed the dormitory in the early years. "Flame of Hope" is the motto engraved on the banner of this house.

Miss Mae Weston was the Principal of the school from 1935 to 1955. The motto of Weston house is "Never Despair".

House songs, appropriately composed in keeping with each motto, ring out every Thursday during House chapel. Each house has a color. The High school girls (6th - 10th Grade) houses (with mottos) are:

- Benthein - Green Bend to nothing
- Delima - Pink Forward ever, backward never
- Fisher - Purple Persevere to the end
- Laura Gill - Orange To greater heights
- Stephen - Red Step up, Stephen
- Watson - Blue Flame of hope
- Weston - Yellow Never despair
