= History of Baldwin Wallace University =

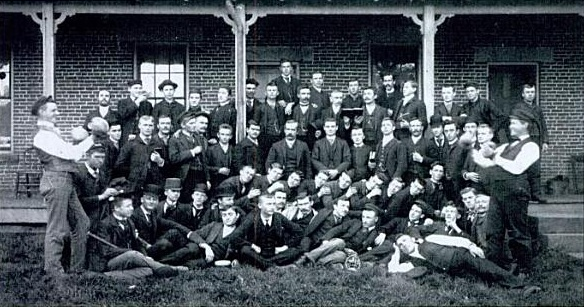
Group of students in front of German Methodist Orphan Asylum (present-day Kohler Hall)

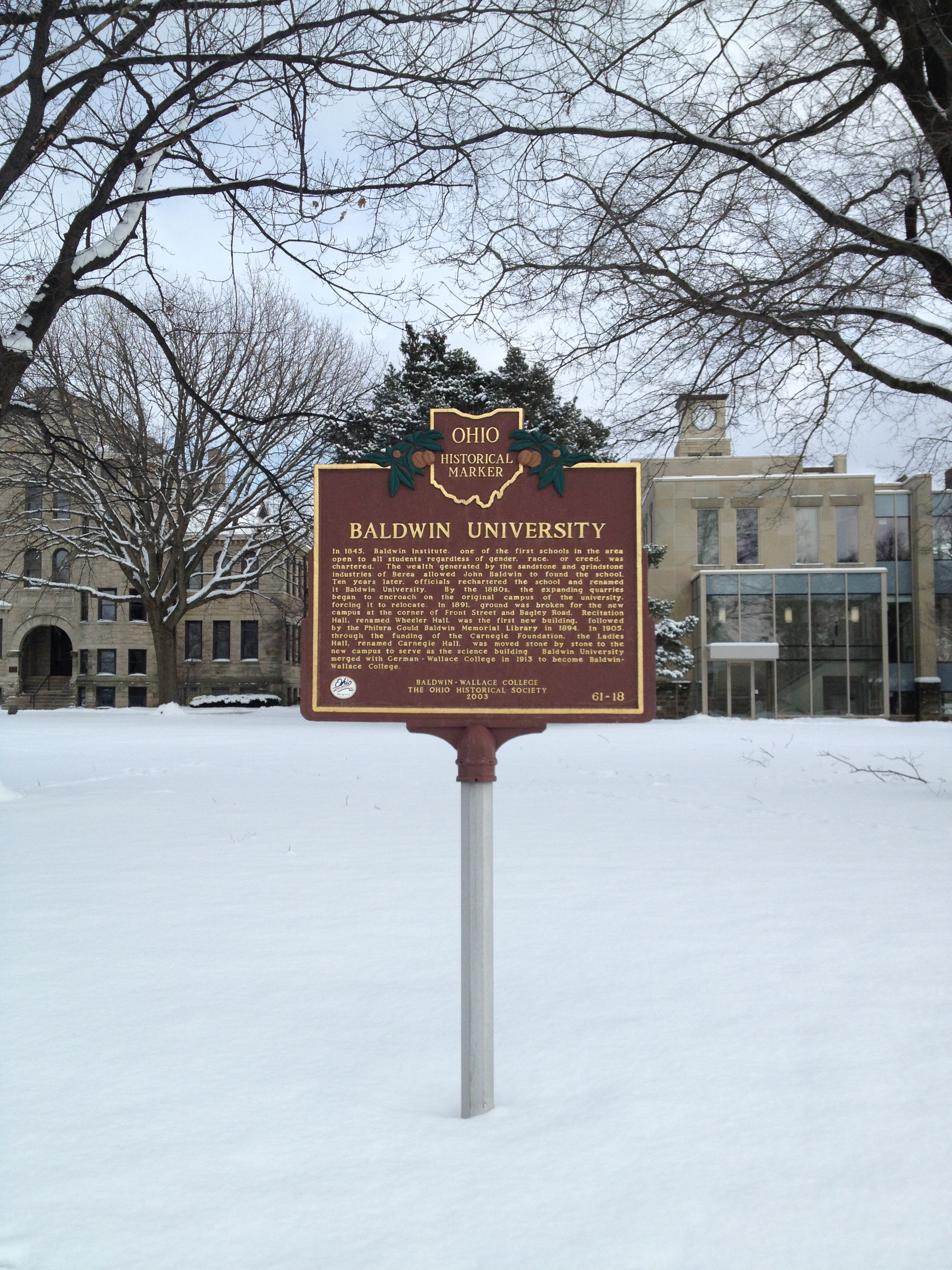
Baldwin Wallace University Historic Marker

The history of Baldwin Wallace University began in 1828, when co-founder John Baldwin settled in present-day Berea, Ohio. His founding eventually established Baldwin–Wallace College. This founding of present-day Baldwin Wallace University began when Baldwin Institute was established in 1845. With the help of James Wallace, Baldwin Institute began offering college courses. Eventually, in 1863, a resolution established a separate school from Baldwin University to serve the booming local German population called German Wallace College. Originally part of Baldwin Institute, German Wallace College was established just down the road. As a result of financial hardships the schools merged in 1913, forming Baldwin-Wallace College. In 2010, several buildings were added to the National Register of Historic Places combining the former Lyceum Village Square and German Wallace College to form the BW South Campus Historic District. In 2012, Baldwin-Wallace College became Baldwin Wallace University and established the BW North Campus Historic District. The Conservatory is home to the Baldwin-Wallace Bach Festival, the oldest collegiate Bach Festival and the second-oldest Bach festival in the United States honoring Johann Sebastian Bach.

== Origins and decline ==
Principles of Baldwin Institute
Principles	Years
D. Dwight	(1846–1854)
John Wheeler	(1844–1855)

Both the university and the town of Berea, Ohio, were founded by Methodist settlers from Connecticut. Those settlers moved west after their homes were burned by the British in the Revolutionary War. The region in Northern Ohio became known as the Western Reserve (a part of which was designated the Firelands, as the state of Connecticut gave land grants to these fire victims). Among early settlers of this area was John Baldwin. The founding of Baldwin Wallace University began with the founding of Baldwin University.

=== Baldwin Institute ===
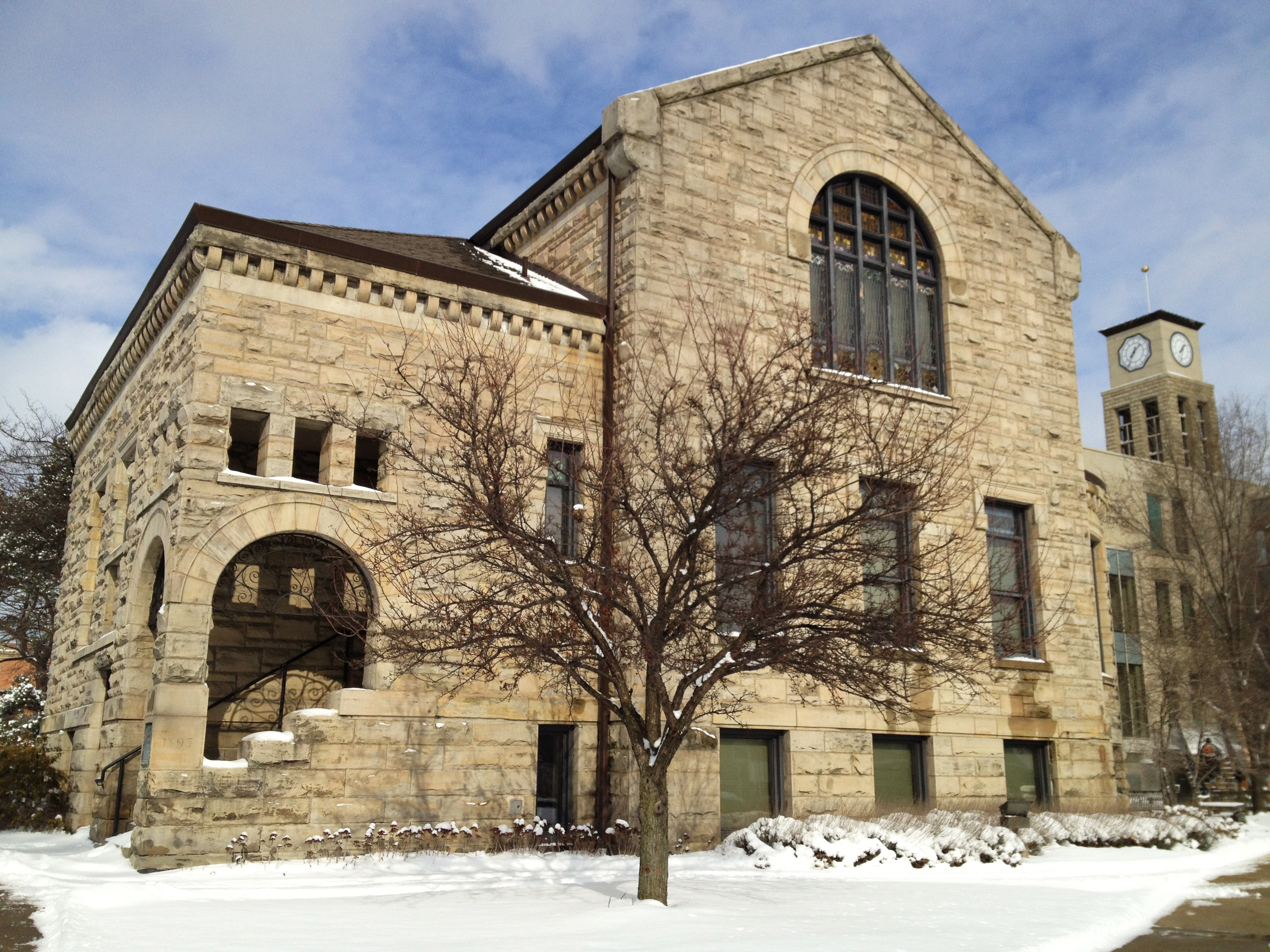
Baldwin Library

Presidents of Baldwin University
Presidents	Years
John Wheeler	(1856–1870)
William D. Godman	(1870–1875)
Aaron Schuyler	(1875–1885)
Joseph E. Stubbs	(1886–1894)
Millard F. Warner	(1894–1899)
Robert M. Freshwater	(1899–1902)
Glezen A. Reeder	(1902–1905)
George B. Rogers	(1905–1907)
Robert L. Waggoner	(1909–1911)
Glezen A. Reeder	(1911–1913)

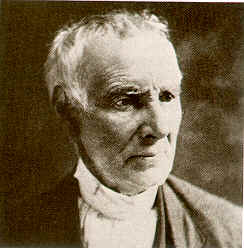
Baldwin Wallace University co-founder John Baldwin

The history of Baldwin University (1845–1913) starts in 1828 when John Baldwin moved to present day Berea, Ohio; at that time it was called the township of Middleburg. In 1836, Baldwin worked with two Methodists to establish the Berea Seminary, which eventually failed. Baldwin discovered a fine-grained stone on his land later called Berea sandstone. In 1838, Baldwin discovered a method to harvest this stone and it became profitable for Baldwin. Baldwin set out to found a Lyceum school, modeled after the Christian perfectionist movement championed by Robert Owen. This funding eventually allowed Baldwin to establish the Baldwin Institute on December 20, 1845. In 1846, the first building, North Hall, also known as "Old Muley", was built. Old Muley is in no relation to the present-day North Hall on the Baldwin Wallace Campus.

Baldwin Institute was a seminary. The first principal, Rev. John Wheeler, was named in July 1855. Under Wheeler, a local business owner, James Wallace, pledged funds for a new building if college courses were offered. Beyond that, there was a surge of German workers in Baldwin's sandstone quarries.

=== Baldwin University ===
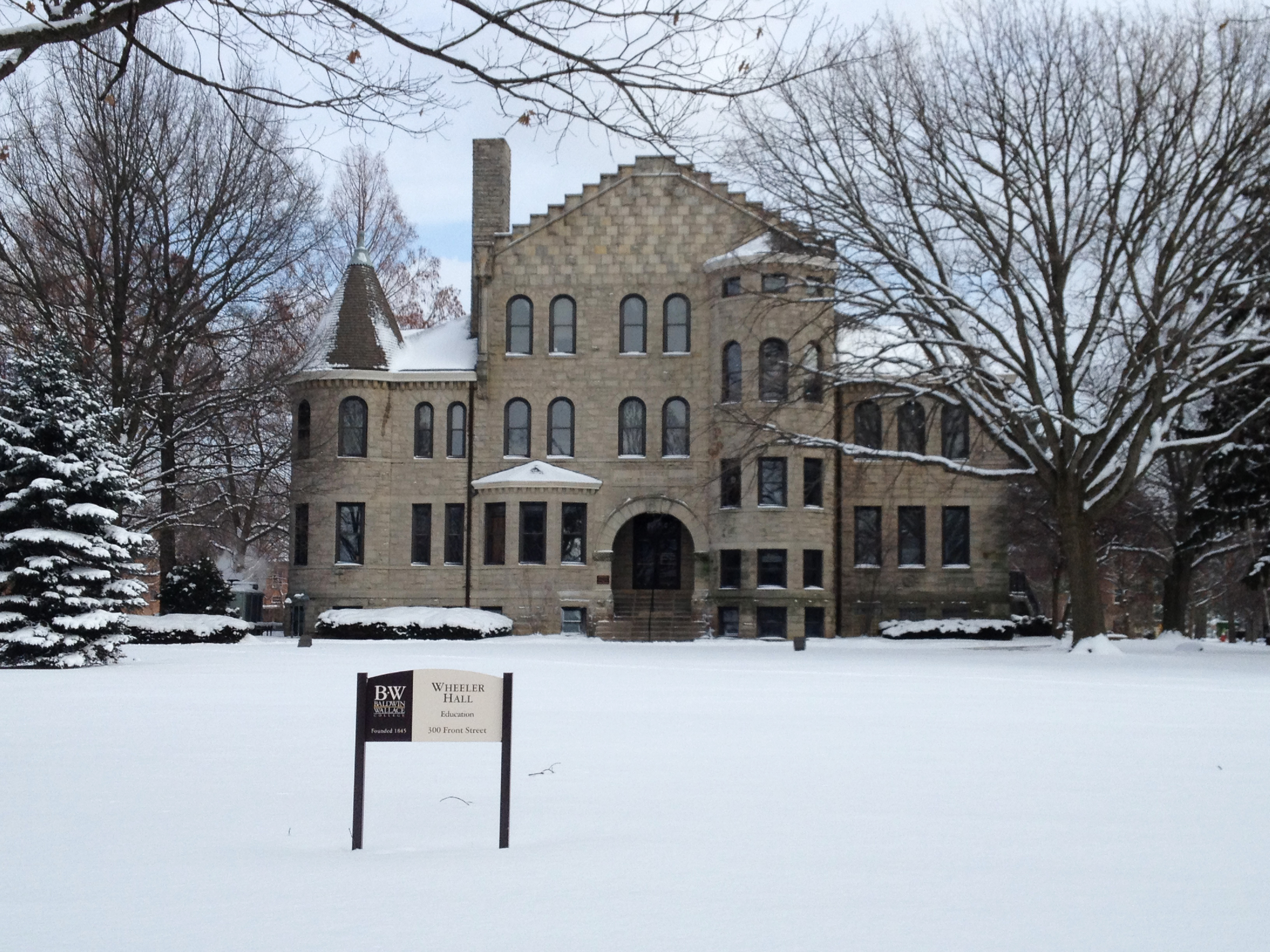
Wheeler Hall formally Recitation Hall

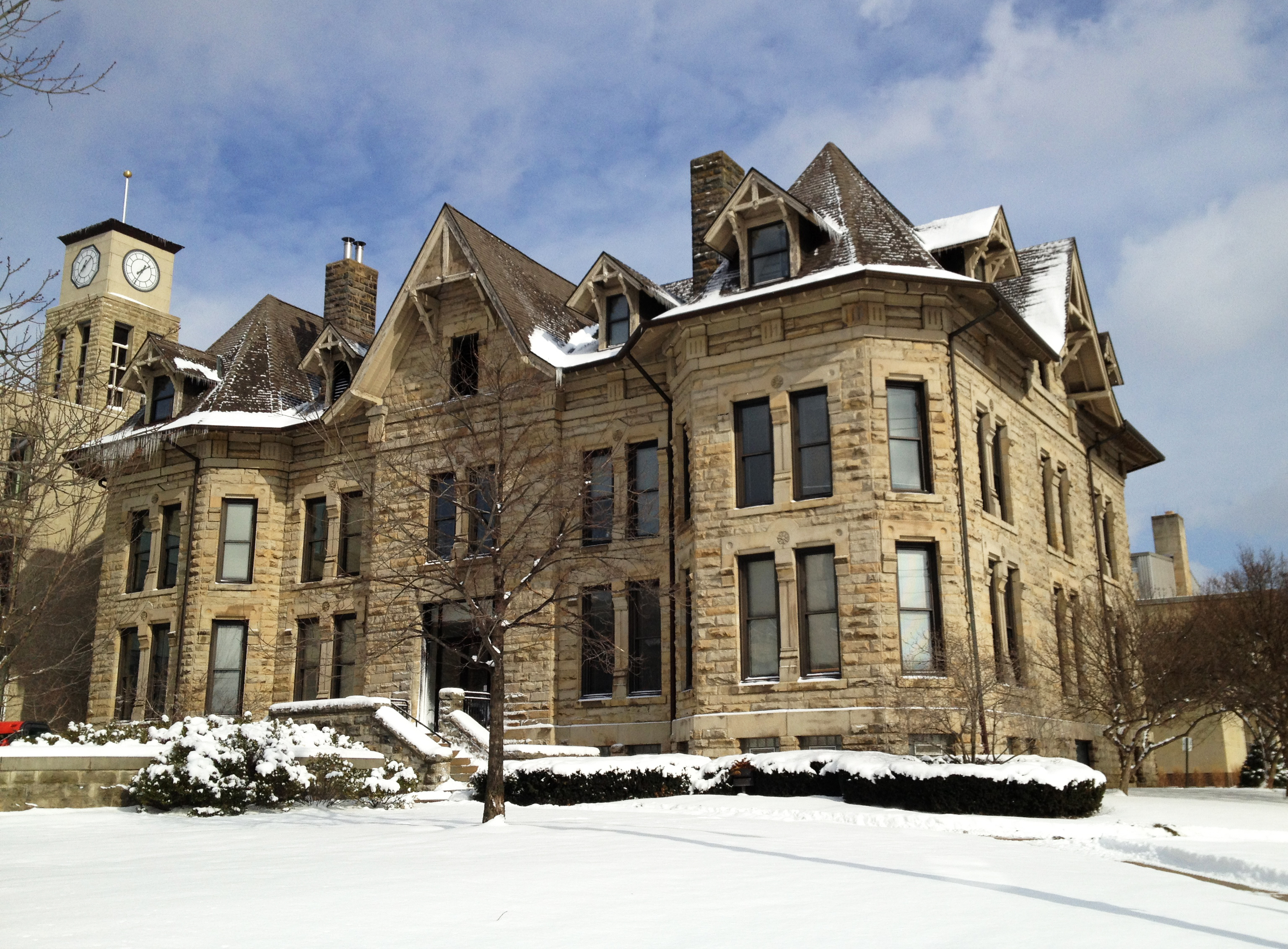
Carnegie Hall

In 1856, a charter was granted establishing Baldwin University. Baldwin's sense of equality led to the school accepting any student regardless of race or gender, and was one of the first in the nation to do so. Moreover, Baldwin University's courses were not segregated. With the pledge from Wallace, the school began to attract students of German descent. Eventually, in 1863, a resolution established a separate school and department for these German students. This established German Wallace College. German Wallace College and Baldwin University existed in harmony, and students were allowed to take classes from either school.

A person of historical significance to the university's history is Philura Gould Baldwin. Philura Gould Baldwin graduated in 1886 and was the granddaughter of John Baldwin. Philura started the school's first library by collecting and cataloging books. Beyond this, Philura suggested the traditional colors of brown and gold for the school colors. These were also the school colors for Baldwin University, which still stand today. Philura died from consumption at age 26 (b. November 28, 1865; d. March 3, 1892). The Baldwin family donated funds for a library that was dedicated in her memory in June 1894. The Philura Gould Baldwin Library was eventually made part of the Malicky Center in the 1900s.

By the 1880s, the quarries had begun to intrude on the site of the university. In 1891, the school broke ground for a new campus at Front Street and Bagley Road. New buildings were constructed and old buildings were moved. In 1872, Hulet Hall was built using Berea sandstone, at an original cost of $10,000. Hulet was eventually torn down in 1972. The new buildings include Recitation Hall (now called Wheeler Hall), which was built in 1891; the ground-breaking ceremony was led by Mary Baldwin, John's daughter. Current buildings from Baldwin University that still exist include the Philura Gould Baldwin Library and Carnegie Hall. Today, Baldwin Library and Carnegie Hall are connected and have been added as part of Malicky Hall.

=== Conservatory of music ===
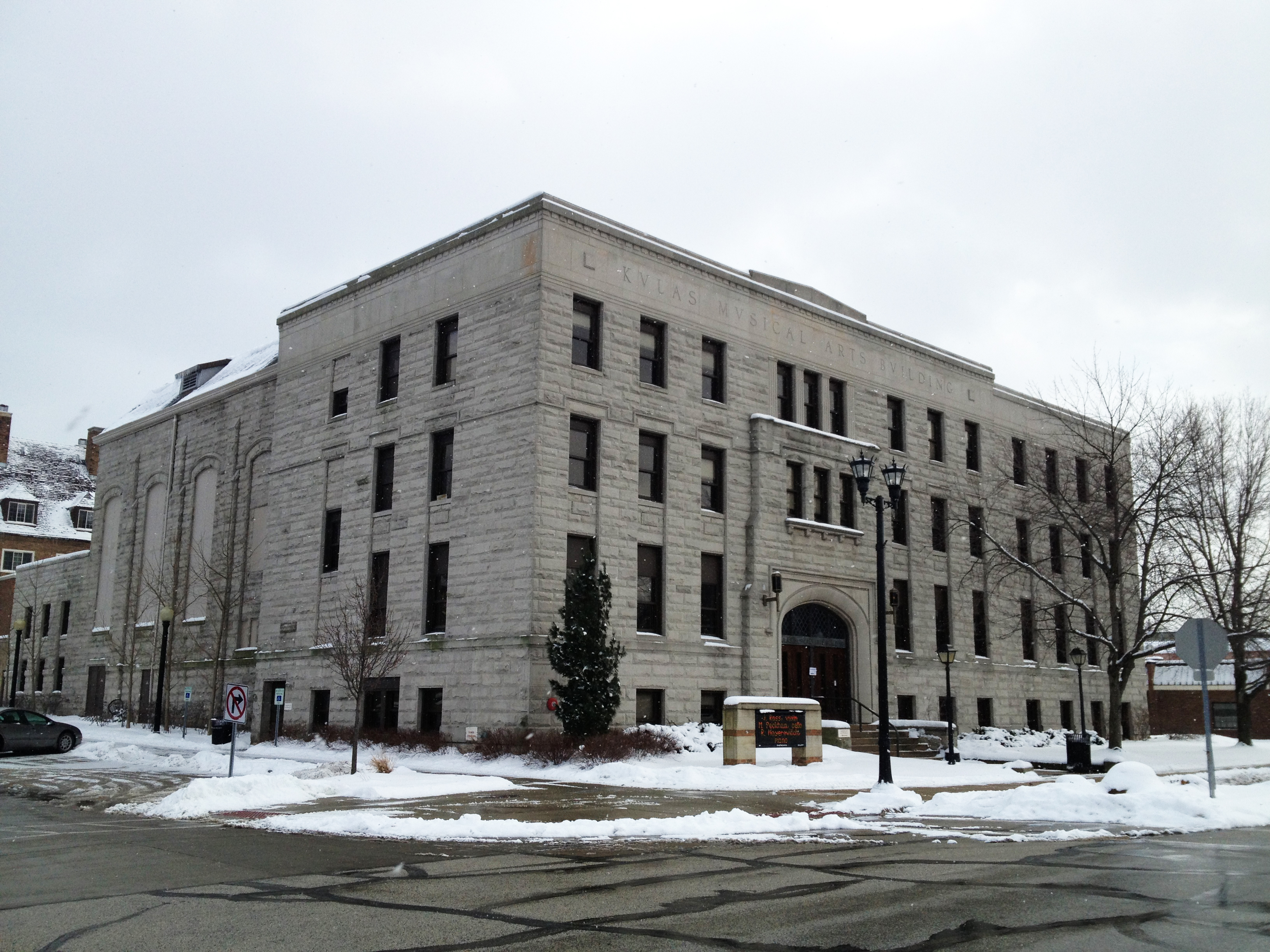
Kulas Hall opened in 1912

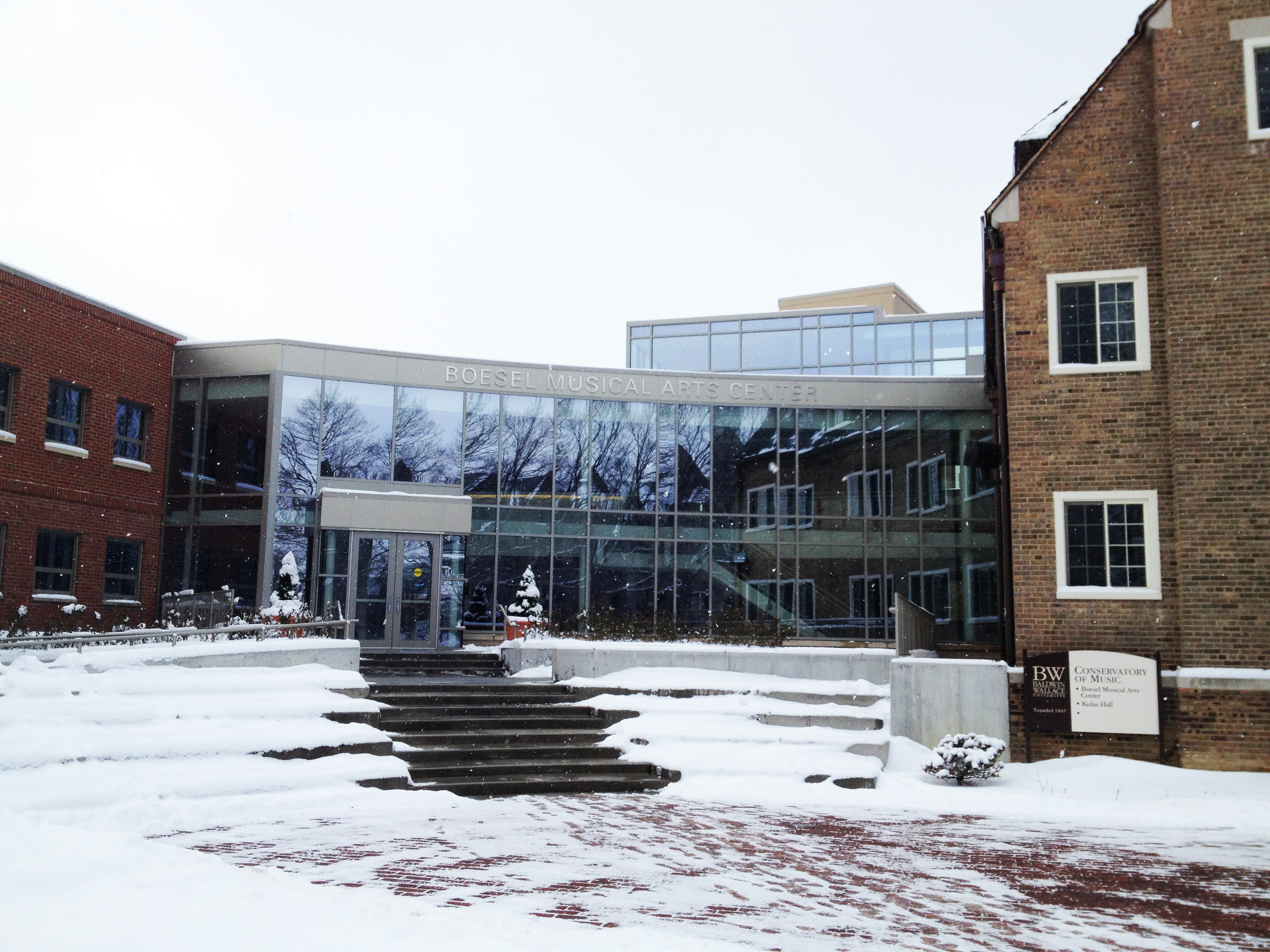
Boesl Musical Center opened in 2011

During Baldwin Institute's existence, the Baldwin Wallace Conservatory of Music was established. In 1898, the undergraduate-only conservatory was founded by Dr. Albert Riemenschneider. Before this time, music classes were offered at the Baldwin Institute for one dollar extra per term. In 1912, land donated by the citizens of Berea was used to expand the institution and improve the music facilities. The Kulas Musical Arts Building was constructed, housing a $25,000 pipe organ. Later, in 1913 the Conservatory would expand into an adjacent residence hall (Merner-Pfeiffer Hall), and an enclosed bridge was constructed connecting the two buildings. This building was then renovated in 1939. In 2009, the Berea First Congregational Church became part of the college. Then, in 2011, there was an expansion to connect the Kulas Musical Arts Building with the Berea First Congregational Church.

The Baldwin Wallace Conservatory of Music is home to the BW Bach Festival, which is the oldest collegiate Bach festival, and the second-oldest Bach festival, in the United States. In 1932, Professor Albert Riemenschneider founded the Bach Festival. The longtime Director of the College Conservatory and his wife (Selma), the then Baldwin-Wallace Festival Choir and the BW Orchestra presented the first Bach Festival in June 1933. This festival has continued since then, and features the works of Johann Sebastian Bach.

=== German Wallace College ===
German Wallace College motto

"Educandis" (Latin for Educating)

— the motto of the old German Wallace College.

Presidents of German Wallace College
President	Years
William Nast	(1864–1893)
Karl Riemenschneider	(1894–1908)
Edwin S. Havinghurst	(1908–1910)
Arthur L. Breslich	(1910–1913)

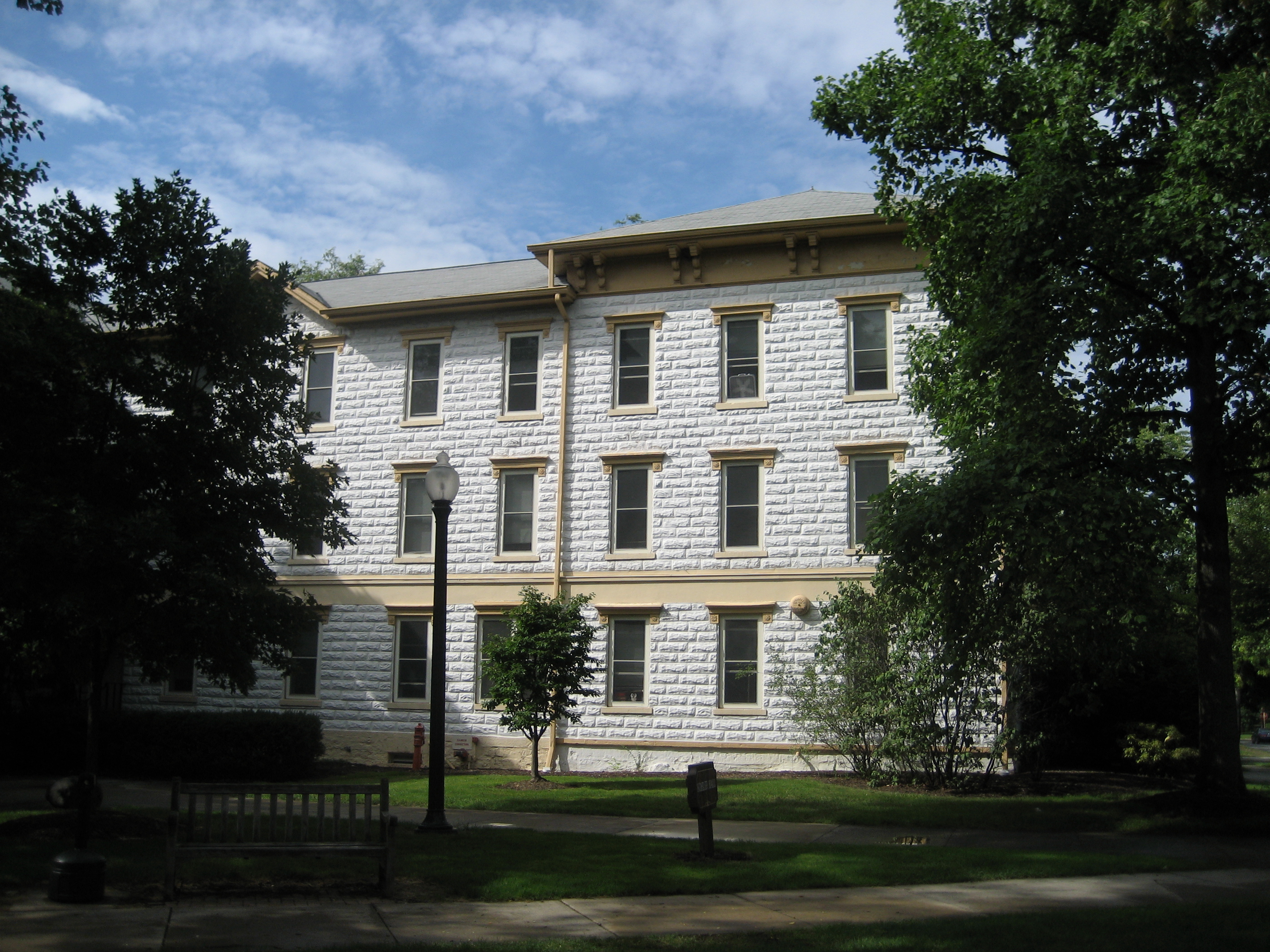
Kohler Hall originally called the Methodist Children's Home

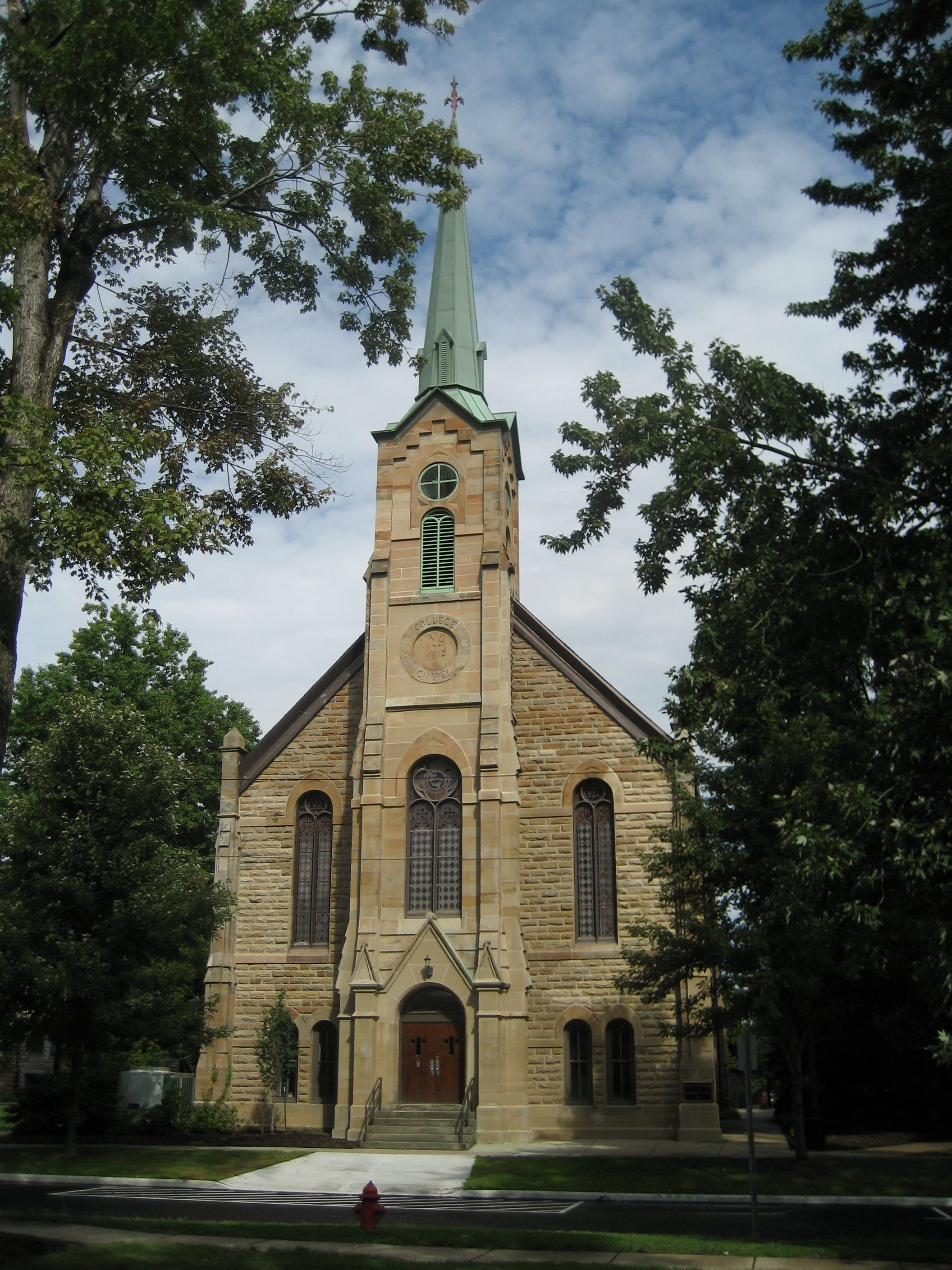
Lindsay Crossman Chapel

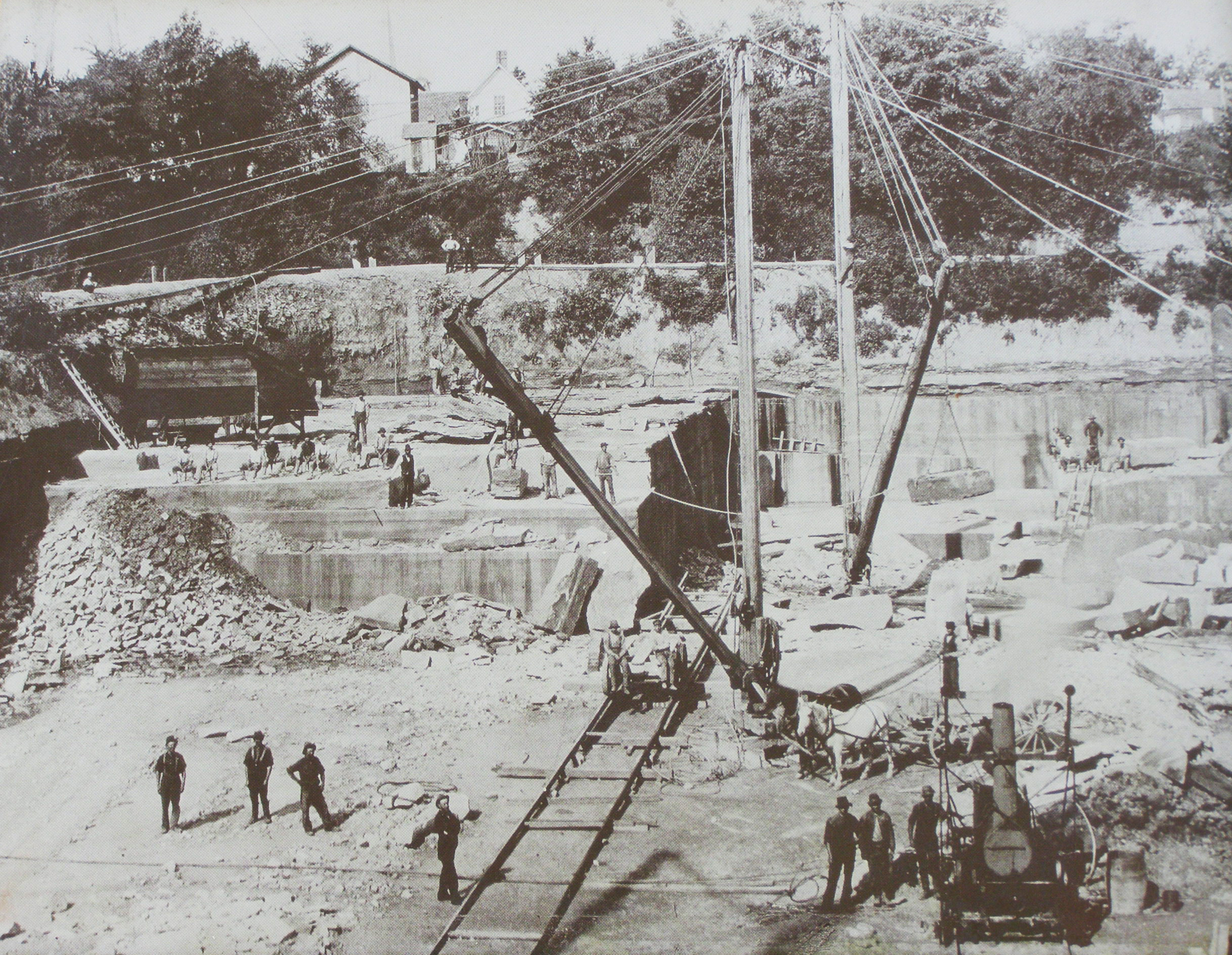
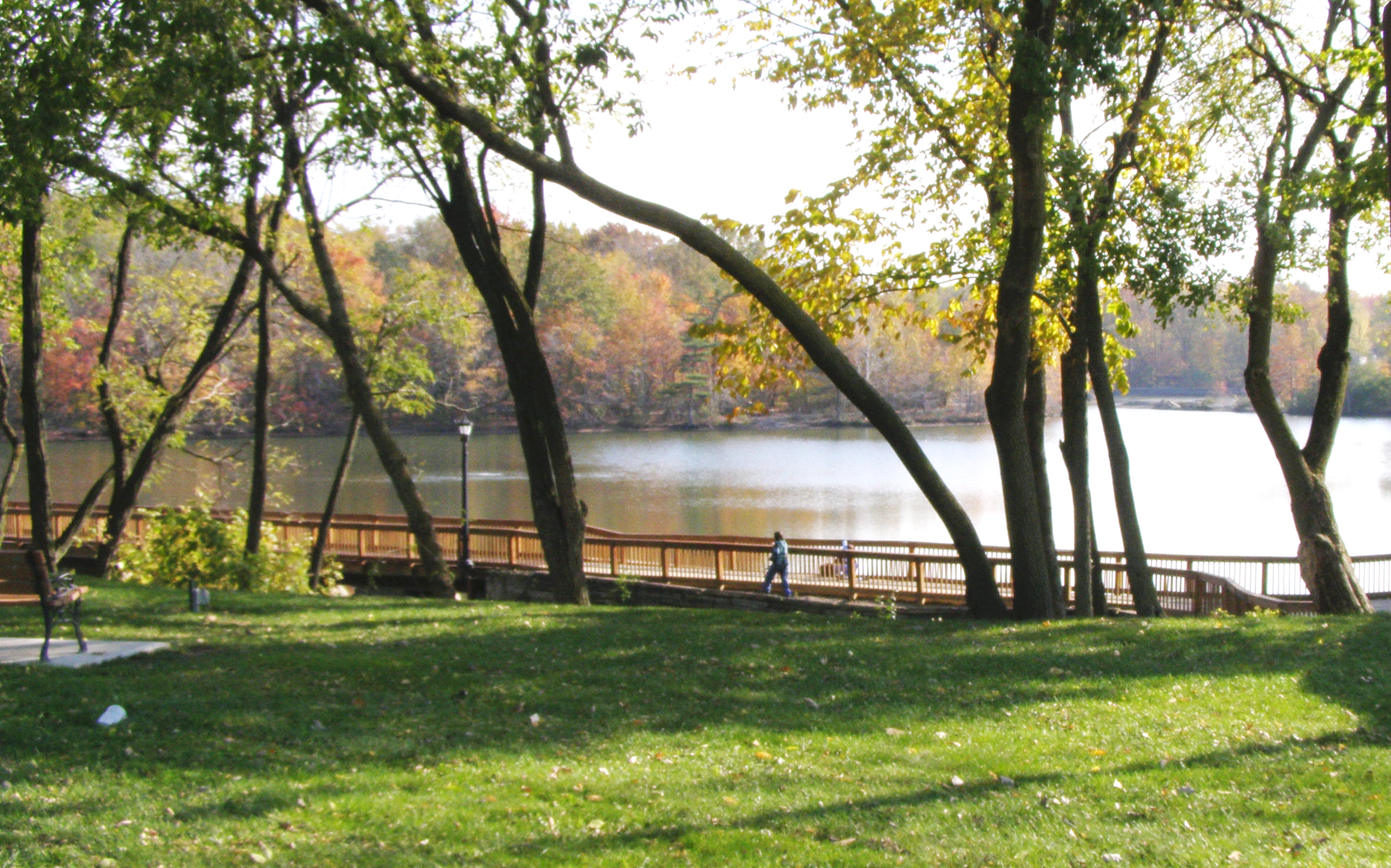
Big Quarry eventually became Coe Lake

German Wallace (1864–1913) was originally established under Baldwin Institute. German Wallace College was a German Methodist institution. In the late 1850s and early 1860s, a surge of German workers began to settle in present-day Berea, OH, to work in John Baldwin's sandstone quarries. German American James Wallace pledged funds to Baldwin Institute under the condition that they offer college courses. The funds James Wallace pledged were for a new building. Due to now offering college courses in 1856, a Charter was granted establishing Baldwin University. Baldwin Institute immediately began to attract and recruit students of German descent. This recruitment eventually established a German department at Baldwin University.

The Reverend Jacob Rothweiler of the Methodist Episcopal Church, who served as a professor at Baldwin University, was appointed 3 June 1863 to inaugurate the movement to establish German Wallace College. Eventually, in 1863, a resolution established a separate school for these German students called German Wallace College. German Wallace College was established on 7 June 1864. The college was established with the goal of promoting "scientific education and Biblical Christianity" for German Americans. Rothweiler also sought a place for higher learning for the waves of German immigrants to the United States. Even though a new school was established, the two schools worked harmoniously together from the start. An example of this is that students were allowed to take courses interchangeably between the two schools. As well, students from either school were entitled to all the privileges of the others.

Then, in 1866, James Wallace purchased the site of the Lyceum Village from the German Children's Home to create the German Wallace College Campus. Another building in this village is Lindsay Crossman Chapel. Crossman Chapel was built under the name Emmanuel Methodist Episcopal Church; the church was not renamed and became part of the campus until the 1950s. Across the street from Crossman Chapel is Kohler Hall. Kohler hall was built in the 1870s as the Methodist Children's Home. Kohler wouldn't become part of BW until 1913. Kohler Hall today mostly houses Conservatory students (although it is open to all students). It has a reputation for being haunted, and has been featured in the book Haunted Ohio. Before becoming a residence hall, it was first a hospital for Civil War veterans, and later believed to function as a mental institution. The Rev. William Nast, D.D., was for many years the Honorary President of the college. Early de facto presidents included the Rev. Jacob Rothweiler, the Rev. Frederick Schuler, and P.F. Schneider.

=== Decline ===
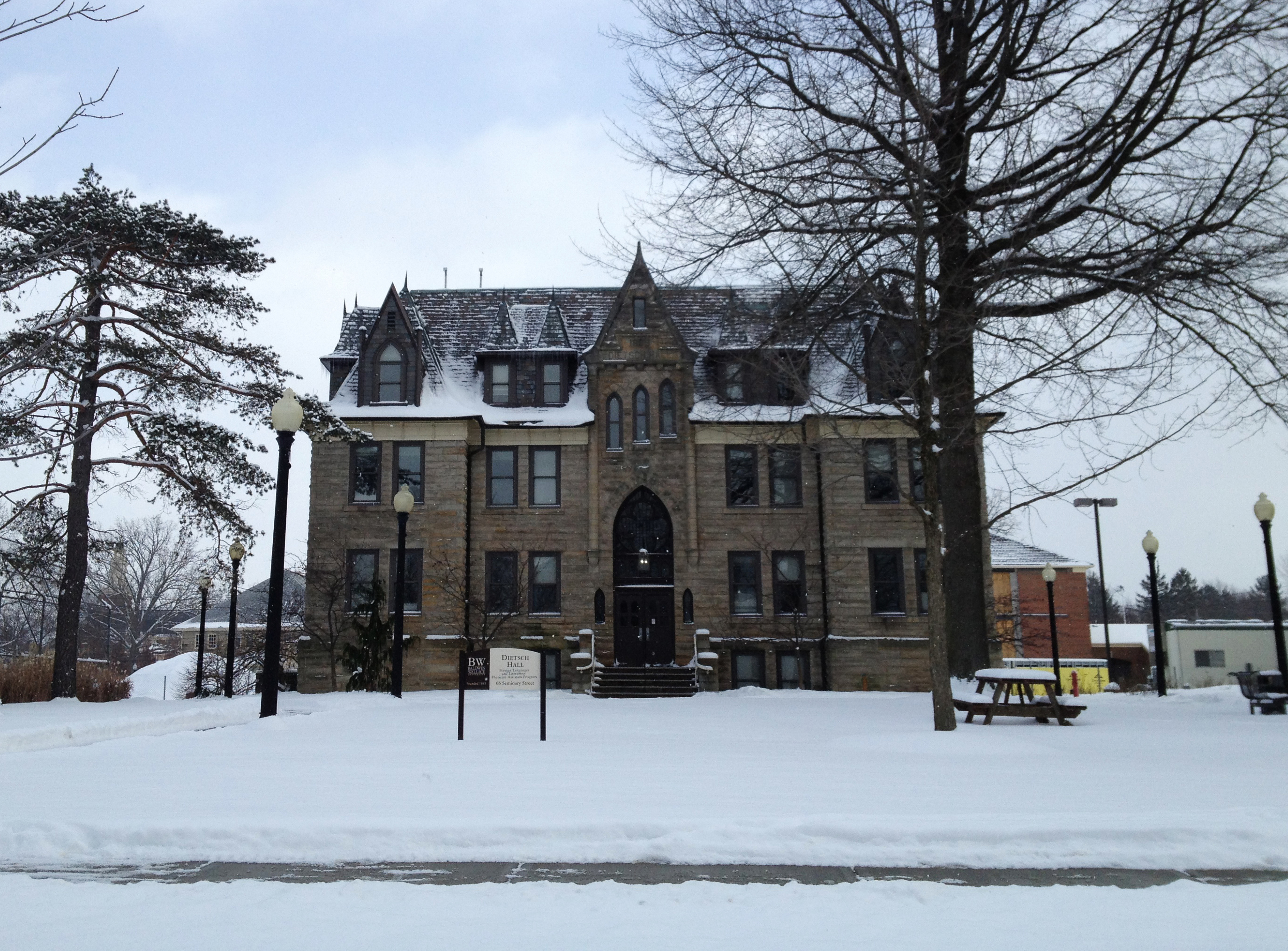
Dietsch Hall

After the deaths of John Baldwin and James Wallace, both schools came close to ruin. In the early 1900s, Baldwin Institute and German Wallace began to experience financial decline. This decline was fueled by the dying quarry industry in Ohio. As well, the sandstone quarries in Berea were in decline. Coe Lake originated from one of these quarries, called "Big Quarry". Over time, the quarry filled with water, creating the lake that exists today.

With the future of the two schools unknown, the United Methodist Church considered merging the schools with Ohio Wesleyan University in 1880 to form the University of Cleveland. This concept was abandoned eventually when a new option arose. The two schools during their histories worked together by allowing students to take courses at either school. This partnership helped bring forth the idea that Baldwin University and German Wallace College should merge. In 1913, Baldwin–Wallace College was founded using the motto "In Union There is Strength".

== Founding and expansion ==
Presidents of Baldwin-Wallace College
President	Years
Arthur Louis Breslich	(1913–1918)
Albert Boynton Storms	(1918–1933)
Louis C. Wright	(1934–1948)
John Lowden Knight	(1949–1954)
Alfred Bryan Bonds	(1955–1981)
Neal Malicky	(1981–1999)
Mark H. Collier	(1999–2006)
Richard Durst	(2006–2012)

Baldwin-Wallace College motto

"In Union There is Strength"

— Adopted at the merger of Baldwin University and German Wallace College in 1913.

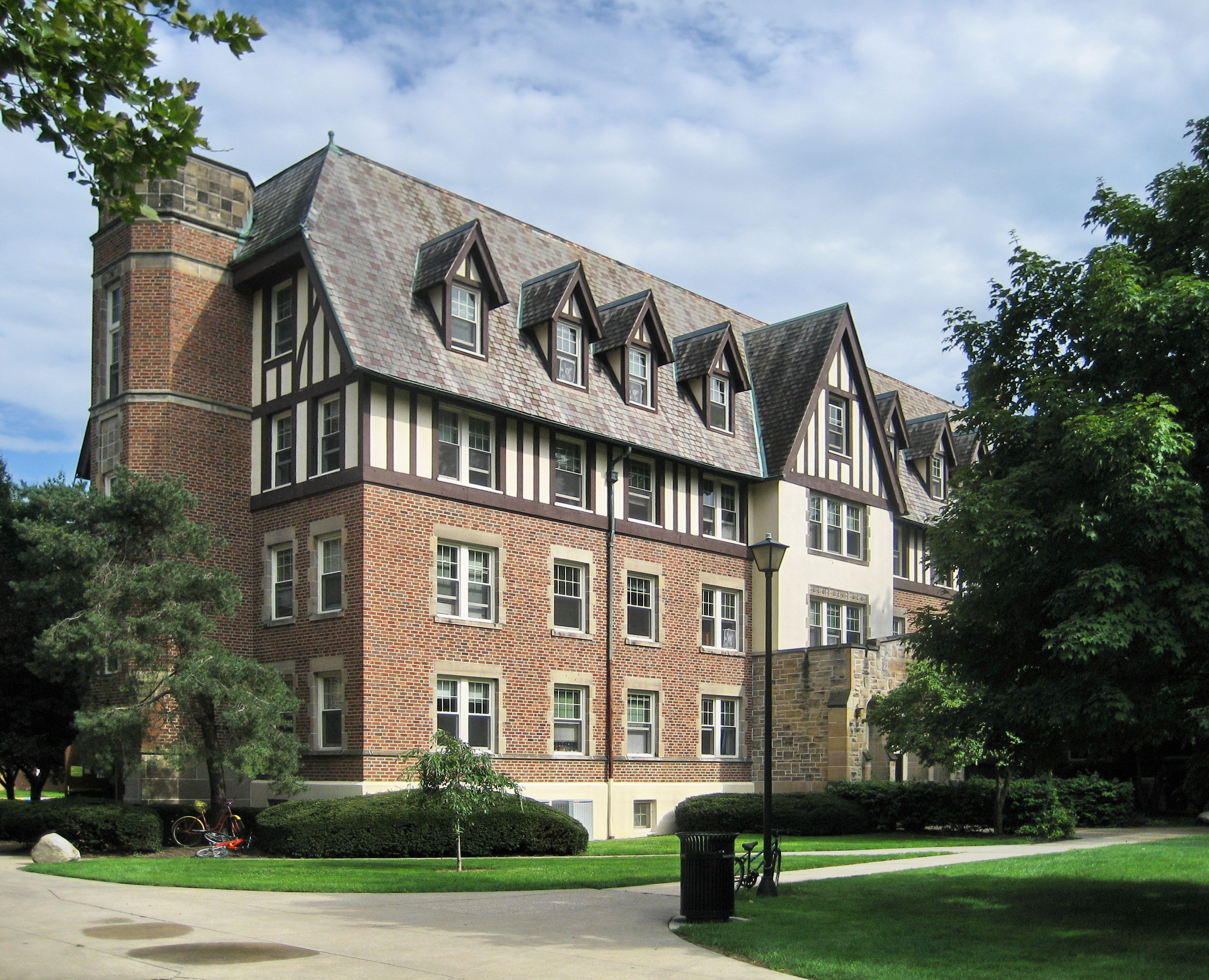
Lang Hall built in 1928

Upon the school's foundation in 1913, Baldwin–Wallace College began to grow and expand. At this time Marting Hall, Dietsch Hall, and the chapel made up German Wallace, which merged with Baldwin University to form the current campus.

This merger was followed by the addition of some of the historic buildings that still exist today. In 1915, Wheeler Hall was opened on the north end of BW's Campus. In 1928, Lang Hall was built as a dormitory for women, remaining such until 2008. Lang Hall today is rumored to be haunted by the spirit of Emma Lang.

During World War I, with BW having a German student base, the college sent a letter to Washington D.C., with the assurance that BW was an all-American school, the faculty offering their patriotic pledges. In response, on May 23, 1918, President Woodrow Wilson sent BW a letter of thanks.

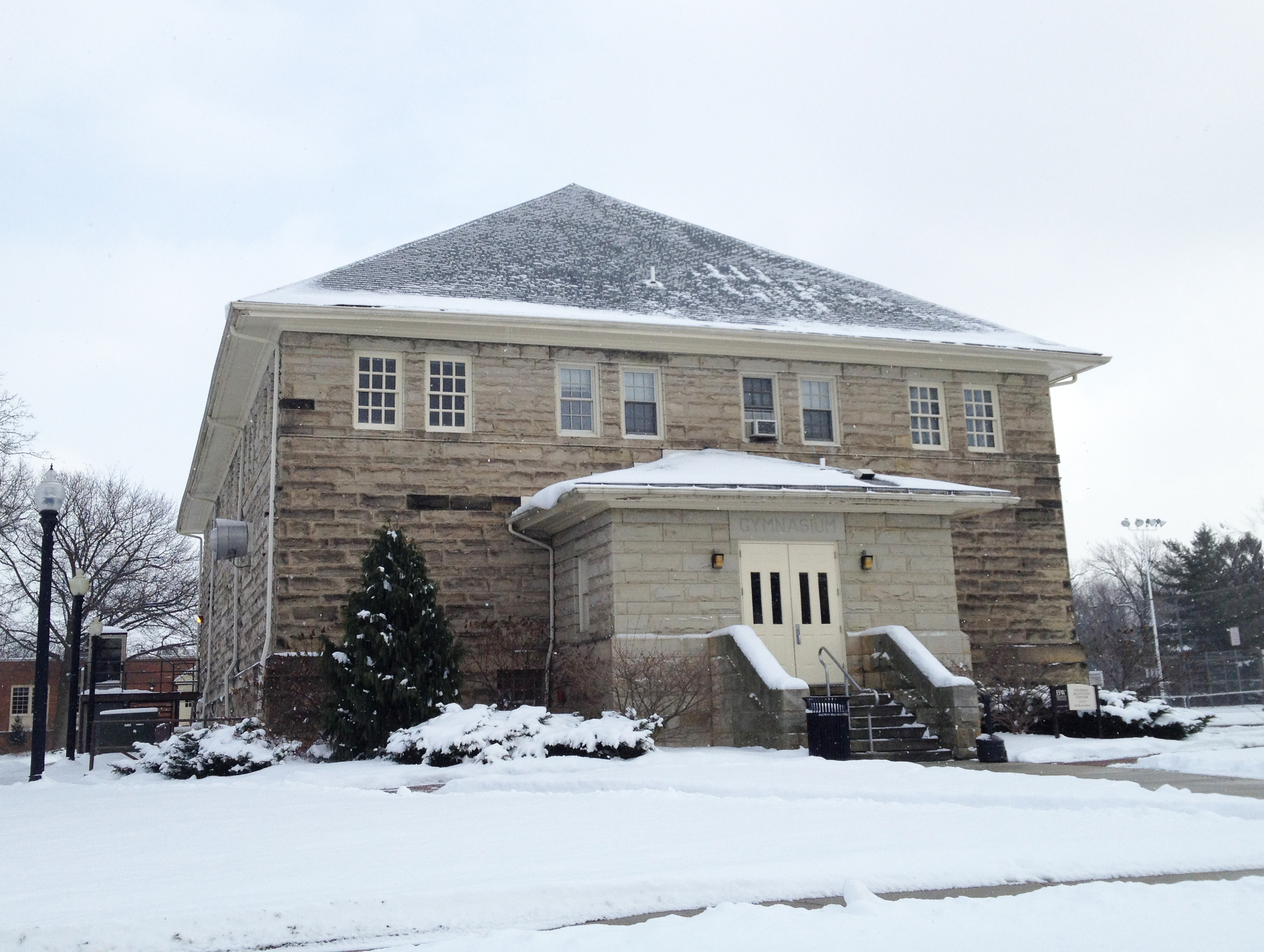
Student Activities Center where many campus events happen

During World War II, Baldwin-Wallace was one of 131 colleges and universities nationally that took part in the V-12 Navy College Training Program which offered students a path to a Navy commission. During this time the Navy added an expansion to the Women's gymnasium (called the Student Activity Center "SAC" today) in the area between the Strosacker Union and the SAC. This building housed a swimming pool and was torn down in 2002. Today the Circle of Warmth Firepit sits in its spot. As well, the remnants of the indoor swimming pool can be seen on the east side of the building, bricks having been left that form a curved shape on the SAC.

In 1940, BW opened Burrell Memorial Observatory, and Ward hall named after Katherine Ward Burrell and Edward P. Burrell. The observatory houses a Warner & Swasey refracting telescope with a 13 3/8 inch objective, a 4 – inch finder, and a 1-inch finder.

=== Greek life growth ===
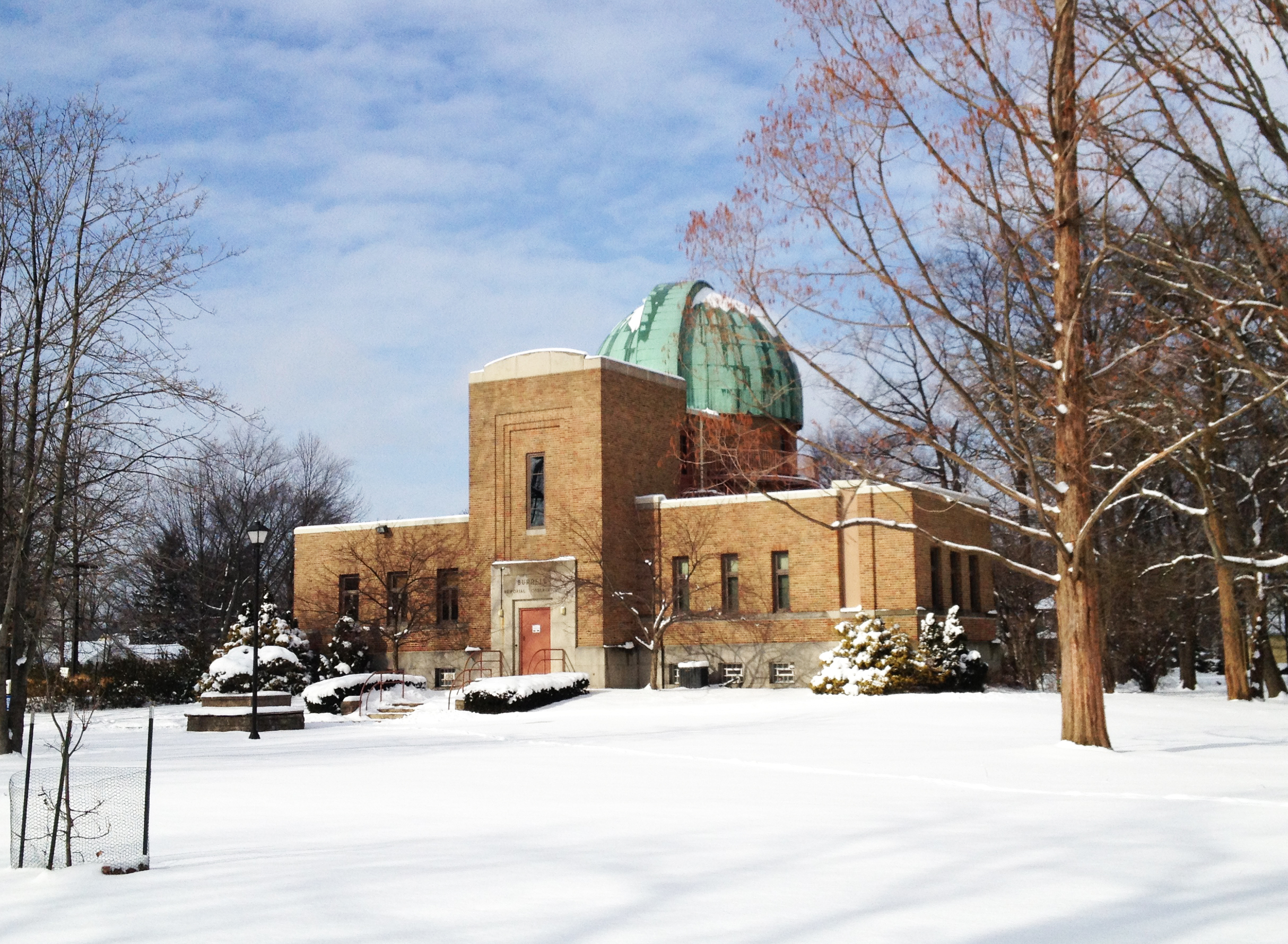
Burrell Observatory built during Wright's Presidency

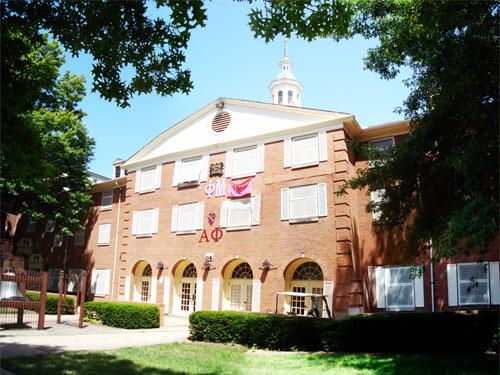
Heritage Hall built in the 1960s today houses some fraternities and sororities

BW's Greek life system is unique in that all fraternities and sororities are housed on campus in the school's residence halls. The reason for this has long been believed to be a city ordinance passed by the city of Berea in the 1960s. Many of the Greek life organizations began to form on the campus during Louis C. Wright's presidency. The locations where Greeks have been housed have changed throughout the school's history, but today many are housed in Ernsthausen Hall. The oldest fraternity on campus is Lambda Chi Alpha, which was founded in 1926. The oldest sorority is Alpha Gamma Delta, which was founded in 1940.

Active fraternities on campus include Alpha Sigma Phi (founded 1939),Lambda Chi Alpha (founded 1926), Sigma Phi Epsilon (founded 1948) and Phi Kappa Tau (founded 1942). A currently inactive fraternity is Alpha Tau Omega (founded 1941). Many of the fraternities have taken turns being active on campus. Sigma Phi Epsilon was removed in 2005 due to an accident caused by two students wrestling. The fraternity was brought back in Fall 2006. Lambda Chi was inactive throughout the mid-2000s but brought back in 2010. In addition, Alpha Sigma Phi returned in 2008 after being absent from campus for more than a decade. Alpha Sigma Phi was originally a chapter of Phi Pi Phi before the two fraternities merged in 1939.

Active Sororities on campus include Alpha Gamma Delta (founded 1940), Alpha Phi (founded 1964), Delta Zeta (founded 1941), and Zeta Tau Alpha (founded 1957).

BW also has National Pan-Hellenic Council fraternities and sororities with Alpha Phi Alpha fraternity, Alpha Kappa Alpha sorority, Kappa Alpha Psi fraternity, Omega Psi Phi fraternity and Delta Sigma Theta sorority. These organizations used to have individual chapters at BW, however, due to the size of chapters decreasing, they have now merged into citywide chapters primarily at Cleveland State University.

=== Bonds expansion ===
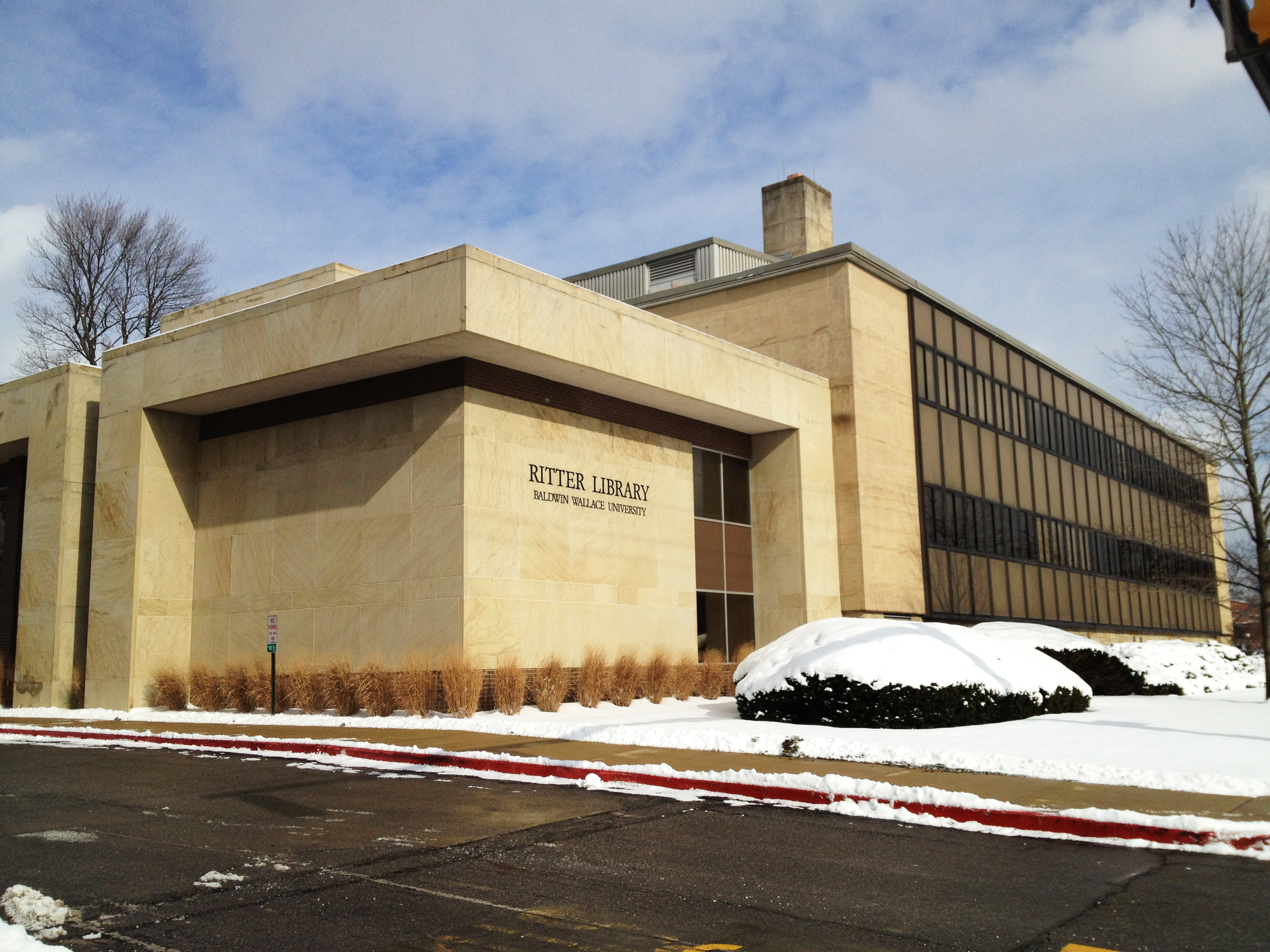
Ritter Library built during the Bonds expansion

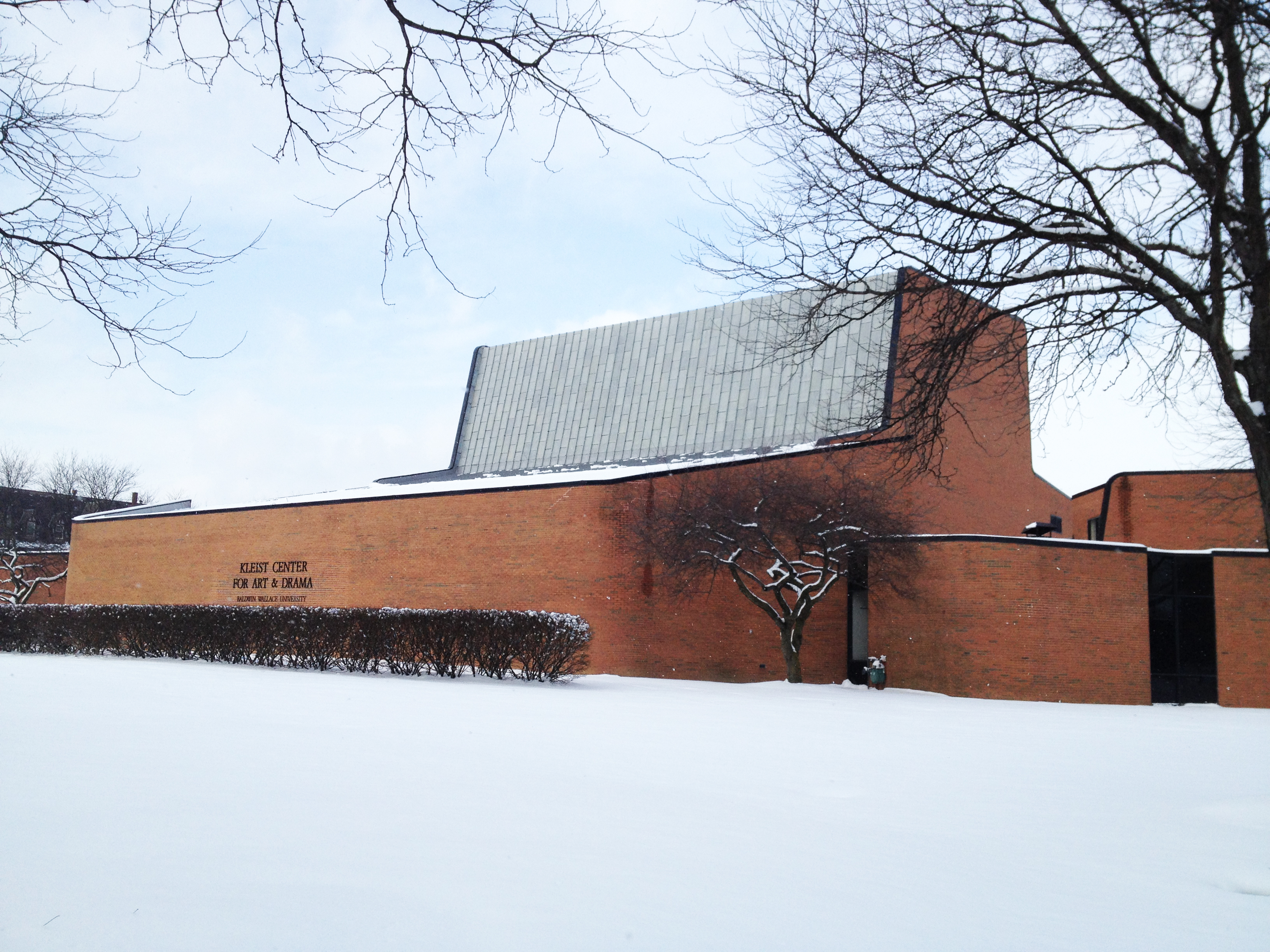
Kliest Hall

The campus that exists today can be credited to the leadership of Alfred Bryan Bonds through much of the mid-20th century; during those years, BW grew to be a large and well respected suburban institution. Bonds oversaw the construction of fifteen buildings on campus during his 26-year tenure. During the presidency of Alfred Bryan Bonds, the Alumni Wall (located behind North Hall) was created to recognize alumni who have contributed to the development of the campus. During this time, many of the present-day residence halls and academic buildings were constructed, such as Findley, North Hall, and Hamilton Apartments. Buildings that were also erected include Ritter Library (1958), Ernsthausen Hall (1961), Heritage Hall (1960s), Strosacker Union (1965), Wilker Hall (1960s), and Kleist Hall (1972). In 1958, WBWC signed on as the first totally student funded and operated radio station in the United States. The radio station still exists today. In 2008, WBWC celebrated its 50th anniversary.

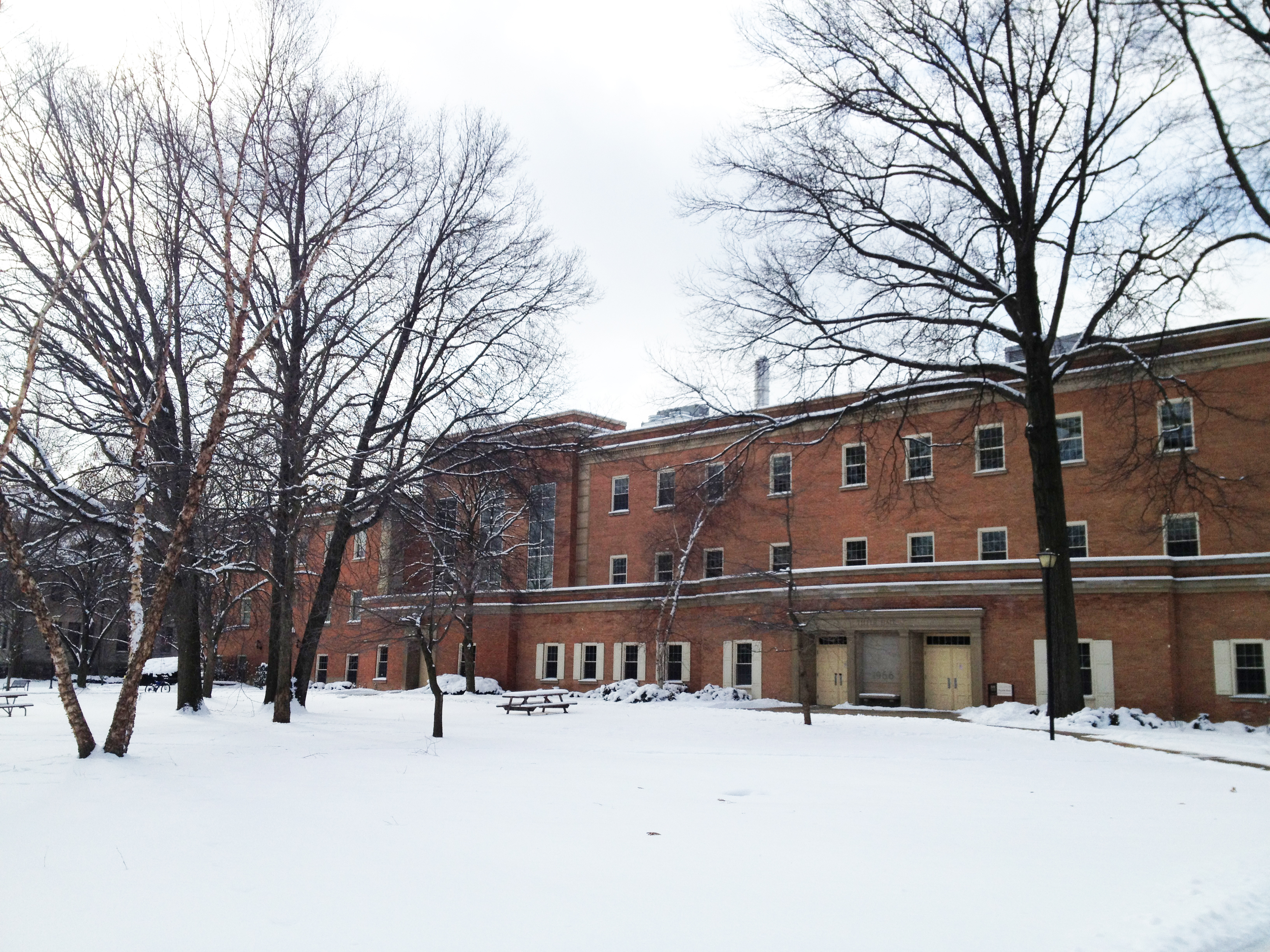
Wilker and Tefler Hall, renovated in 2009

Beyond Bonds, another name that defined the campus during the Bonds era is Lee Tressel. Tressel served as the head football coach and athletic director. He achieved a 155-;52-;6 record in 23 seasons from 1958 to 1980. In 1978, the football team won the NCAA Division III National Football Championship and Lee Tressel was named National Coach of the Year that championship season. During Lee Tressel's time at BW, his wife, Eloise Tressel, worked as the athletic historian at Baldwin–Wallace. Tressel is the father of Jim Tressel. In 1996, Lee Tressel was inducted into the College Football Hall of Fame. Today, on the south side of the Baldwin Wallace campus, there is a "Tressel Street" named in his honor. At the corners where Tressel Street starts and ends, at Bagley Road and E. Center Street, are decorative street signs in honor of Lee and Eloise Tressel for their contributions to Baldwin-Wallace.

An athlete that achieved campus fame during the Bonds era is Harrison Dillard. Dillard competed in the 1948 Olympics and the 1952 Olympics, winning a total of 4 gold medals in sprinting and hurdling.

Unlike neighboring institutions such as Kent State University and Oberlin College, Baldwin Wallace enjoyed relative calm during the Vietnam War era. Campus culture has always been more pragmatic and inclusive than reactionary. However, the college made headlines in its involvement in the federal witness protection program by producing credentials for mob informants in the 1970s. Also, the college experienced a setback in credibility when it accepted a donation of paintings from the Cosla family in the 1960s. These paintings were later discredited as forgeries.

=== Financial stability ===
Baldwin-Wallace College motto

"Quality Education with a Personal Touch"

— BW motto adopted in the 1980s under the tenure of President Neal Malicky

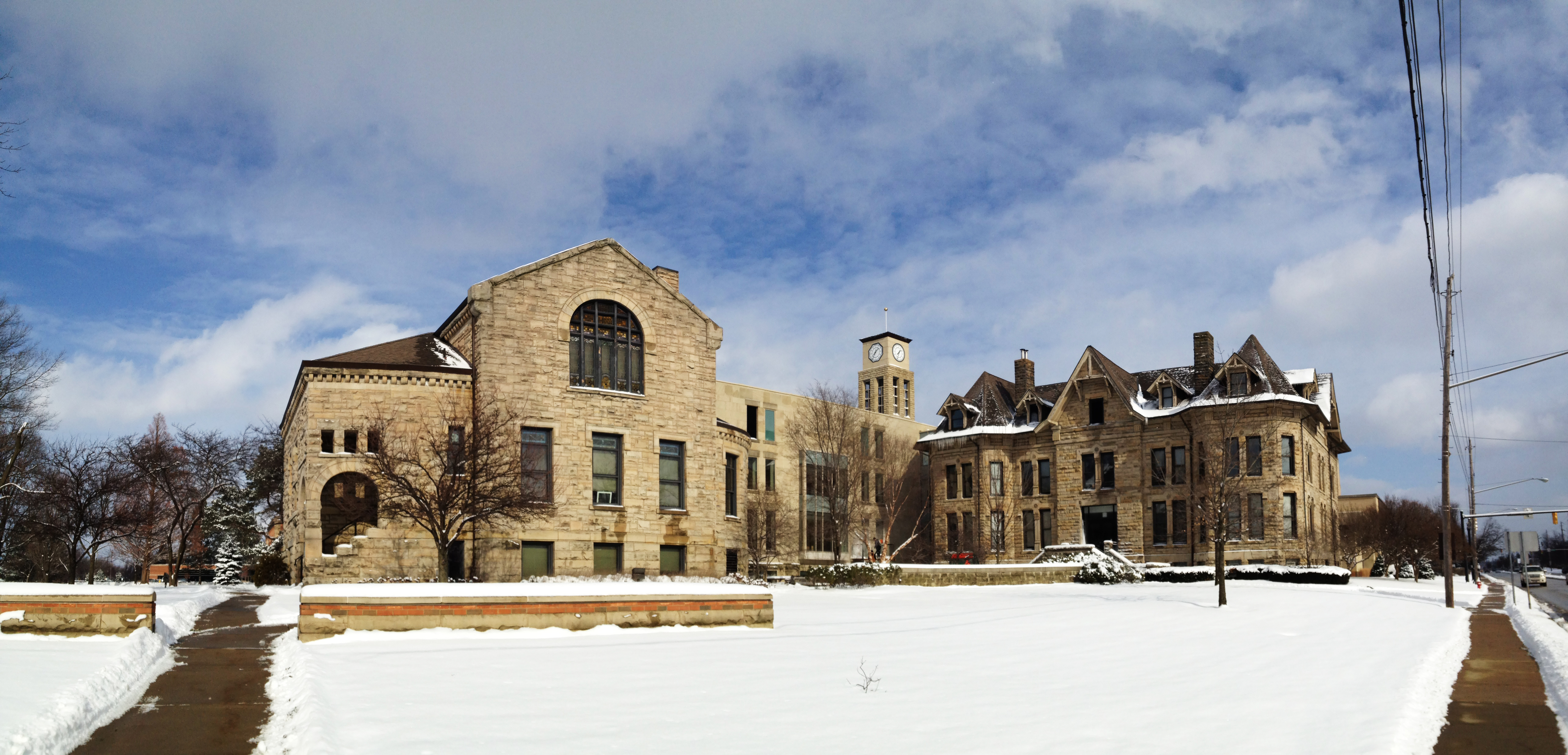
Malicky Hall on North Campus

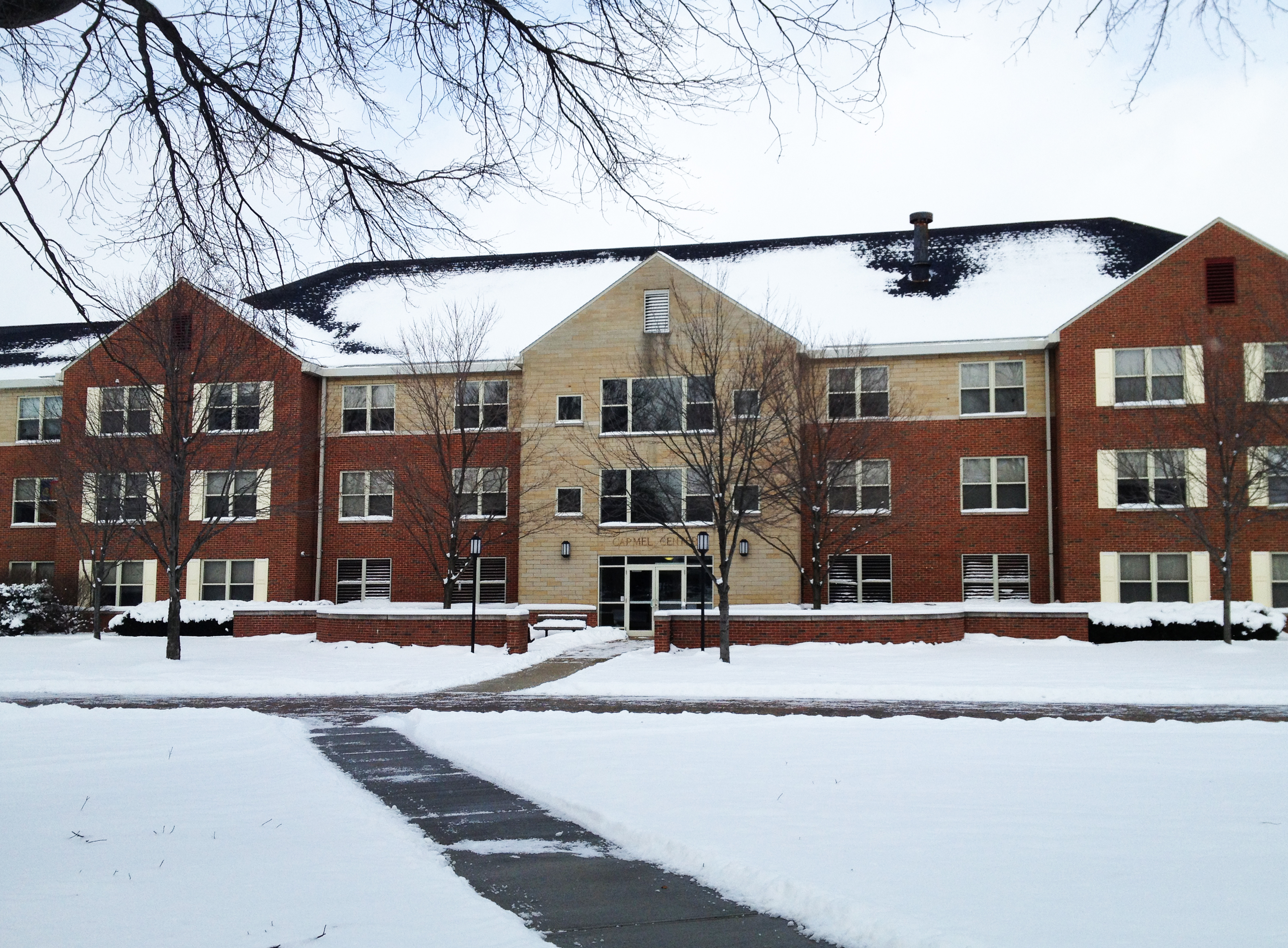
Carmel Hall

During Neal Malicky's tenure as college president, the college's finances and endowment were stabilized, finally placing Baldwin Wallace in financial security after years of financial struggle. Following Malicky's presidency, Mark Collier served as president for seven years, overseeing a campus master plan that led to many major renovations on campus, such as Malicky Hall being built. Malicky Hall combines Baldwin Library and Carnegie Hall, with the addition of new classrooms and offices. As well, during this time BW began to expand and renovate residence halls and academic buildings. In addition, the college purchased existing buildings in the Berea community for academic and student residential use. During the 1990s, Bagley Hall was originally owned by the Cleveland Browns and was used as the team's summer training facility. BW acquired a former practice field and office building when the team was moved to Baltimore to become the Baltimore Ravens. Upon the Cleveland Browns returning to Cleveland, a new training facility was built in Berea close to the BW campus. As well, the Carmel Center for Living and Learning (referred to as Carmel Hall) opened. In 1999, Baldwin Wallace switched from the quarters system to semesters. With this switch, the campus tradition "May Day" ceased to exist. May Day was a celebration in the spring that had a May Queen every year. With the school year ending now in early May, April Reign began. Today, April Reign is a weekend of events such as sporting competitions and a yearly concert.

== 21st century growth ==
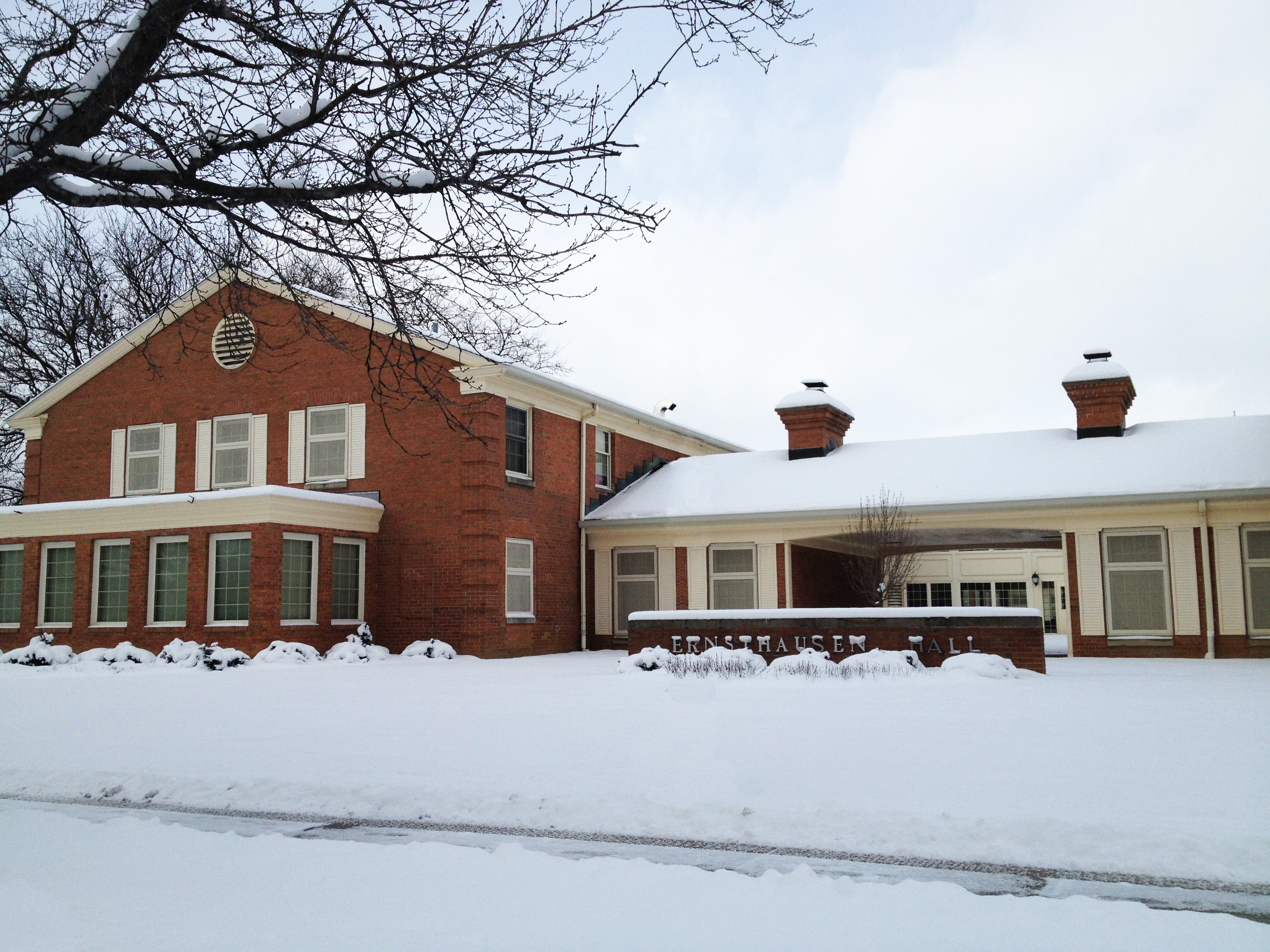
Ernsthausen Hall

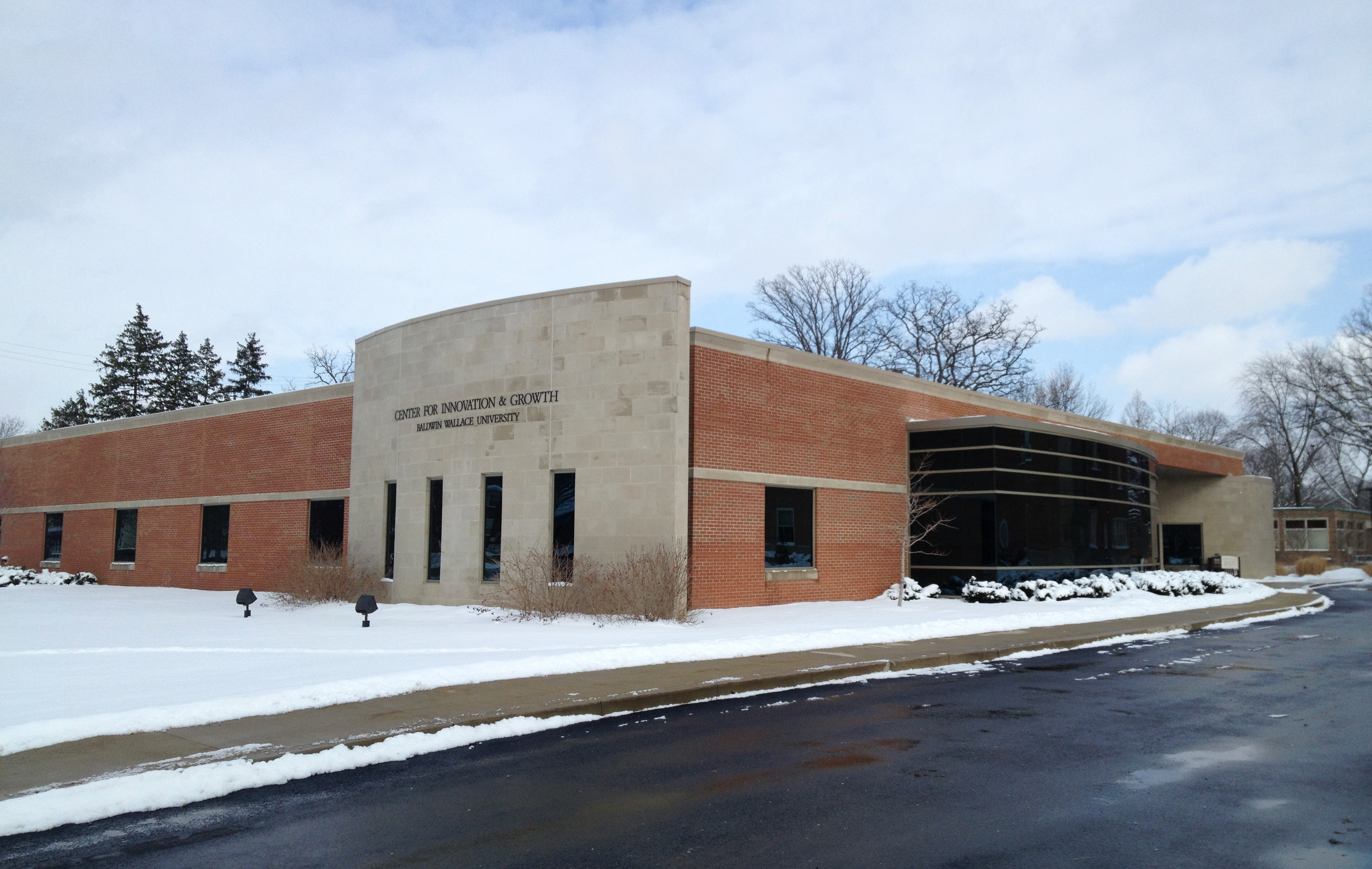
Thomas Center for Innovation and Growth

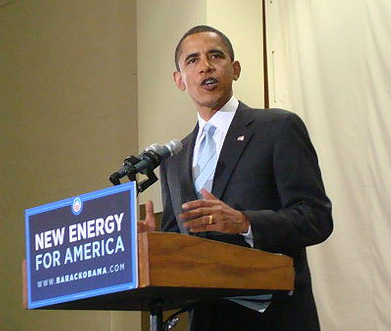
President Barack Obama speaking at BW's Lou Higgins center in 2008

The 21st century at BW can be defined in several ways: the renovation of the campus established by Alfred Bonds; the growth of the campus academically and physically to adapt to a competitive college market; and the end of the presidency of Mark H. Collier and the beginning of Richard Durst's presidency. Signs of this can be seen starting in the middle of the century's first decade. BW started to offer classes at BW East in Beachwood, OH. BW has a satellite campus located in Beachwood, Ohio. The facility is called BW's Center for Adult Learning in Beachwood. Much of the time, the site is simply referred to as B-W East. The site focuses on the needs of working adults and their employers. The facility is located at Landmark Centre Building in Beachwood. Renovations on campus began with Ernsthausen Hall in 2005, when Ernsthausen Hall (called "E-House" for short) was renovated and became the first campus residence hall in Ohio to utilize geothermal power. In 2009, BW opened the Thomas Family Center for Science and Innovation. The project renovated and connected the Life & Earth Science building and Wilker hall with the expansion of a new building. As well, the expansion and renovation of the Conservatory of Music occurred. In 2011, work began to open the Richard and Karen Durst Welcome Center which is located in the lot between the Union and Heritage Hall.

BW in the 2000s began to push green initiatives on the campus, some of them being the first in the state. Ernsthausen Hall is already the first campus residence hall in Ohio to utilize geothermal power to start this movement. In the fall of 2009, BW became the first school in the state to install a wind turbine on its campus. Beyond this, the school expanded its curriculum with an interdisciplinary sustainability major, an environmental studies minor and courses in Green Business.

In 2006, President Collier retired and Richard Durst took office. In 2006, in honor of former BW President Mark H. Collier, the college started "Goals of Enduring Questions: The Mark Collier Lecture Series," which has brought speakers in their respective fields in science, environmentalism and social issues. In past years, the campus has hosted speakers such as economist Ben Stein. During the 2008 Presidential campaign, BW hosted eventual President Barack Obama and 2008 Presidential candidate John McCain. In 2012 BW hosted vice presidential candidate Paul Ryan along with Condoleezza Rice. The last sitting president prior to Obama to visit BW was Ronald Reagan during George H. W. Bush's 1988 Presidential run. The 2016 Presidential campaign resulted in visits from Bernie Sanders and BW hosting John Kasich's Republican Ohio Primary Victory party.

=== Name change ===
Presidents of Baldwin Wallace University
President	Years
Robert C. Helmer	(2012–current)

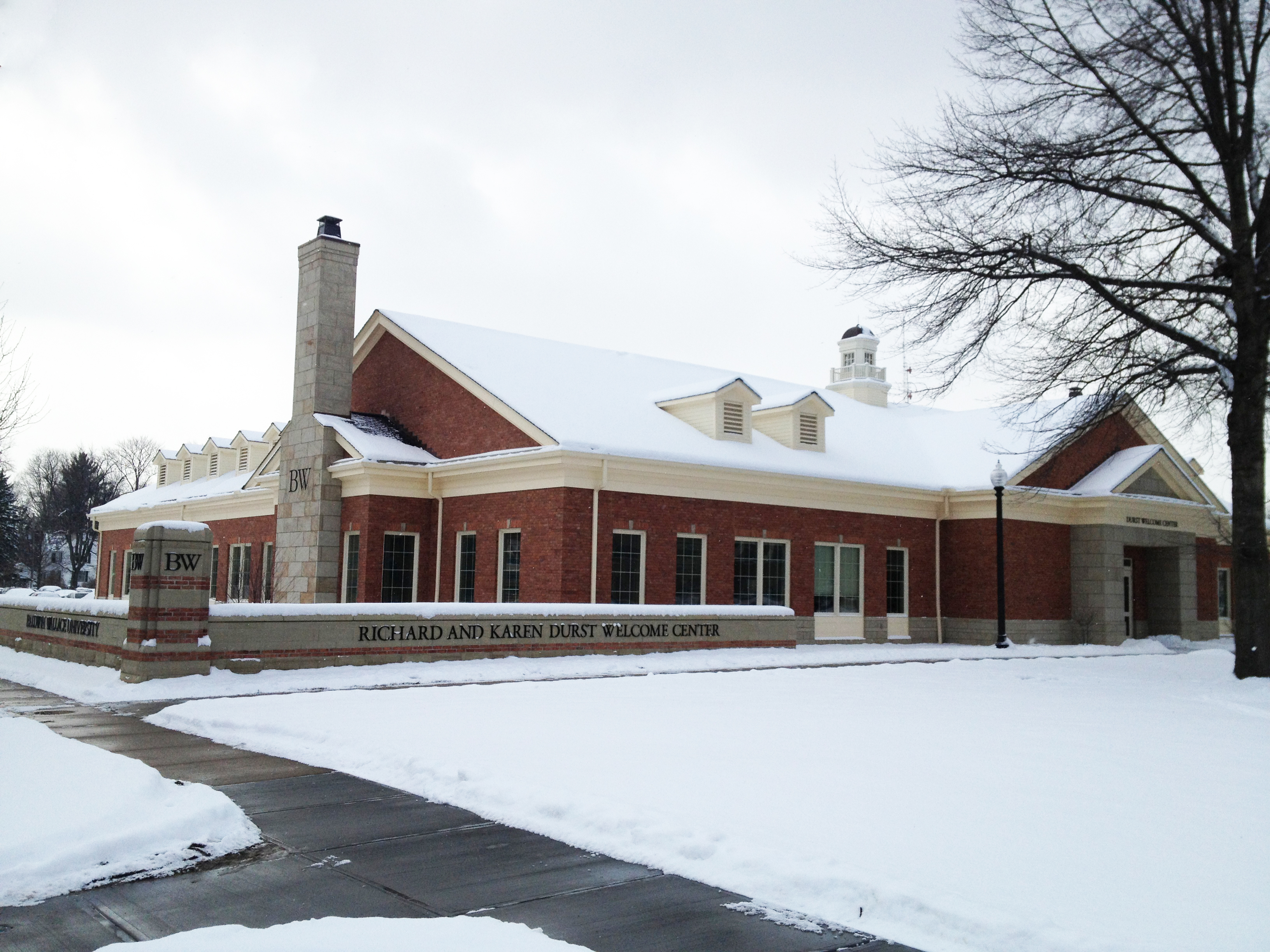
Durst Welcome Center opened in 2012

In the fall of 2011, President Dick Durst developed a task force to explore a name change possibility. On February 11, 2012, it was announced that Baldwin-Wallace College would become Baldwin Wallace University after approval by the BW Board of Trustees. The name would become effective on July 1 of 2012 with complete implementation by the end of 2012. In addition to the new university designation, seal, and logo, B-W would drop the hyphen in its name.

In addition to the name change in February 2012, it was announced that Robert C. Helmer, the president of Lourdes University in Sylvania, Ohio, would serve as the ninth president of Baldwin Wallace. His appointment became effective July 1, 2012. He succeeded Richard W. Durst, B-W's president since 2006. Durst retired on June 30, 2012. Helmer was approved unanimously by the BW board of trustees. The name change was accompanied by plans for renovations of the Union, Saylor Hall, 63 Beech, and Klein Hall, as well as the addition of the Durst Welcome Center on south campus.

The Durst Welcome Center serves as the admissions visit location for prospective students. The Welcome Center is located next to Strosacker Hall. In the summer of 2013, BW reopened the newly renovated Packard Center football facility formally called "Bagley Hall". The building was previously used as a residence hall, and prior to that by the Cleveland Browns.

== Buildings ==
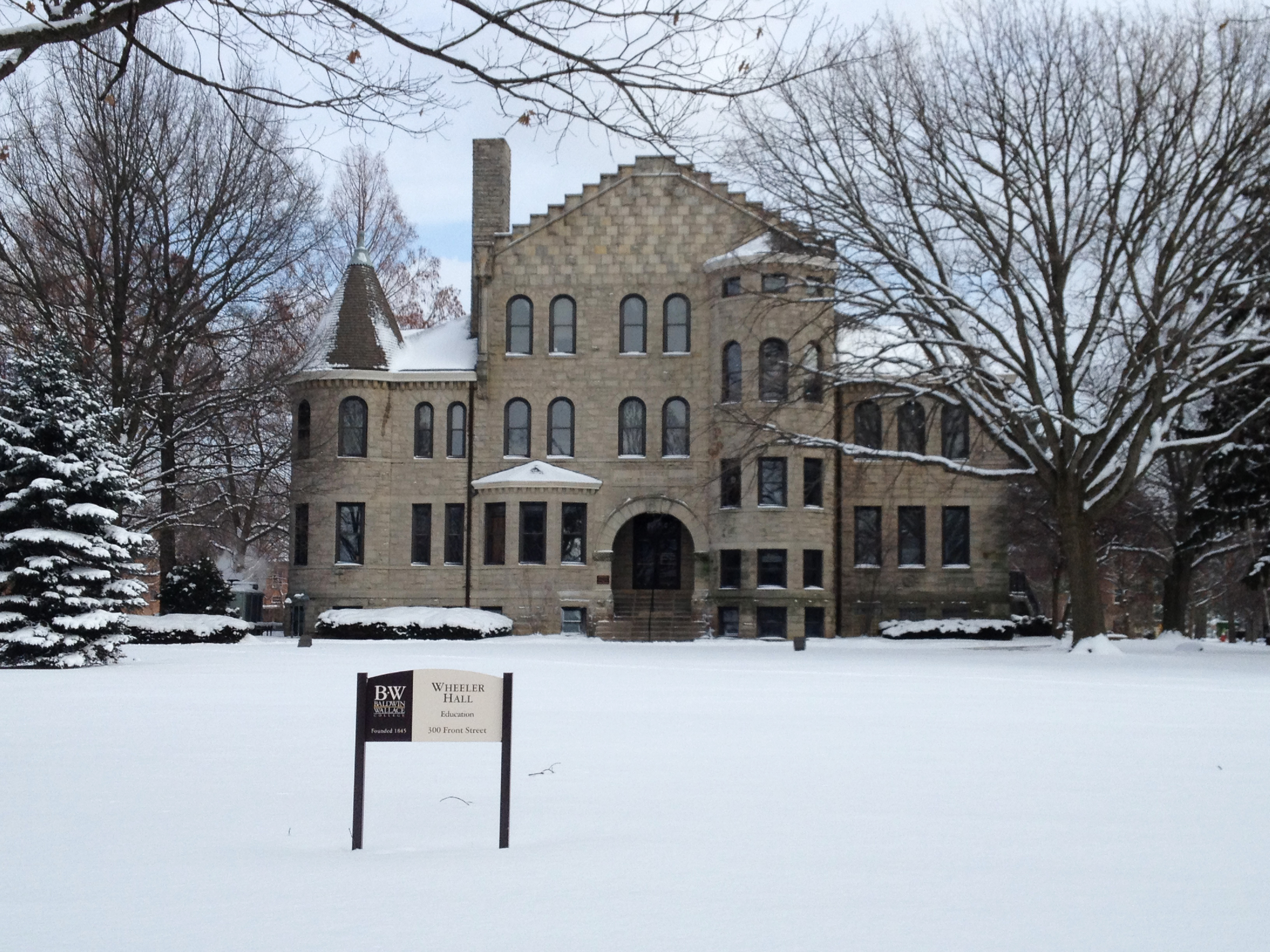
Wheeler Hall is one of several buildings part of the North Campus Historic District

The campus is located in Berea, Ohio, a suburb of Cleveland, Ohio. The campus is built around land that originally was two separate schools that combined in 1913. The campus has numerous buildings that carry historical significance. The campus itself has two historic districts on the National Register of Historic Places.

=== Historic districts ===
In 2010, several buildings were added to the National Register of Historic Places combining the former Lyceum Village Square and German Wallace College to form the Baldwin-Wallace College South Campus Historic District. In 2012, BW moved to propose the preservation of several historic building's on its north part of campus. The North Campus Historic District include buildings such as Baldwin Memorial Library and Carnegie Science Hall (Malicky Center for Social Sciences), Wheeler Hall (Recitation Hall) and Burrell Observatory
