= Andaleeb =

Andaleeb, Andleeb or Andalib (lit. 'nightingale' in Arabic) may refer to:

- Andaleeb (film), a 1969 Pakistani Urdu-language film
- Andleeb Abbas, Pakistani politician
- Andaleeb Begum (1943–2016), Pakistani actress and model
- Andalib Elias, Bangladeshi diplomat
- Andaleeb Suleiman Takatka, Palestinian female suicide bomber, perpetrator of the 2002 Mahane Yehuda Market bombing in Jerusalem
- Andaleeb Wajid, Indian novelist writing in English
