= John Wheeler (college administrator) =

Dr. John Wheeler
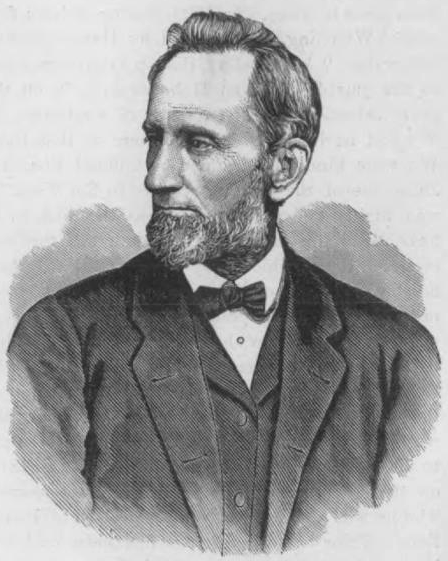
- Born: April 7, 1815; Portsmouth, England
- Died: June 18, 1881 (aged 66); Mount Pleasant, Iowa
- Spouse(s): Mary Yandes & Carla Hulet

- John Wheeler House
- U.S. National Register of Historic Places
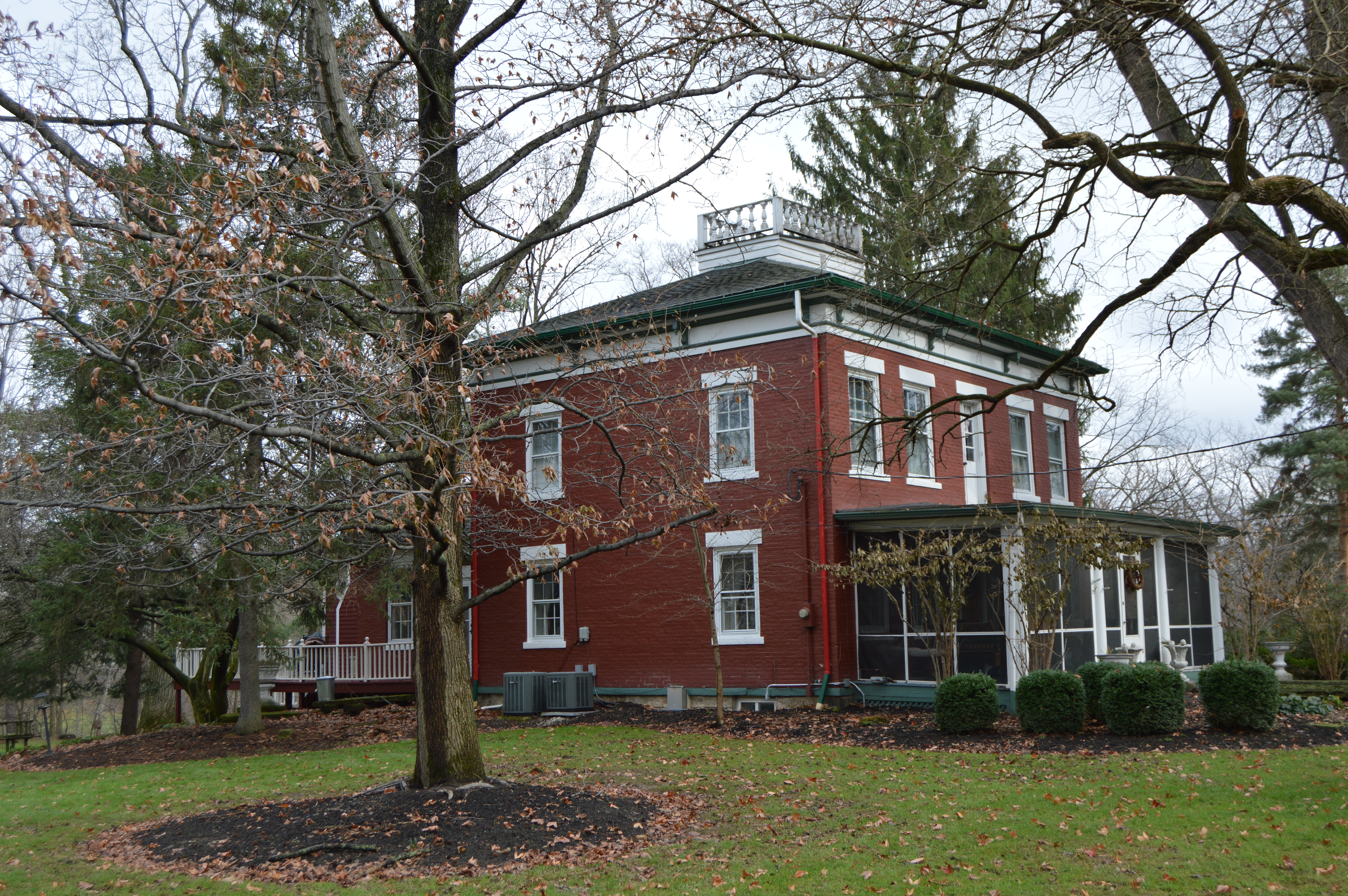
- John Wheeler House (The Little Hermitage)
- Location: Berea, Ohio
- Area: 1.4 acres (0.57 ha)
- Built: 1834
- Architectural style: Italianate
- NRHP reference No.: 78002034
- Added to NRHP: 1978

John Wheeler (1815–1881) was an American educator, the second principal of Baldwin Institute, and the first president of Baldwin University in Berea, Ohio. Baldwin College would eventually merge with nearby German Wallace College to become Baldwin–Wallace College. Wheeler has a building named after him on the Baldwin Wallace University campus.

== Biography ==
=== Life ===
Dr. John Wheeler was born in Portsmouth, England, on April 7, 1815. In 1819 his family moved to America and settled in Bellefontaine, Ohio. In 1824 Wheeler joined the Methodist Church and eventually joined the Norwalk Seminary in 1835. He attended Allegheny College from 1837 to 1839 and Indiana Asbury University until 1840. Once leaving Asbury University, he became principal of Franklin Institute in Indianapolis, Indiana. While there, he married Mary Yandes. The two had had seven children. In 1842 he left Franklin to teach Latin at Asbury until 1854.

=== Baldwin Institute ===
In 1855, Wheeler became the 2nd principal for the recently established Baldwin Institute (1846) founded by John Baldwin. He became the first president of Baldwin College in 1855, and during his presidency, his wife, Mary Yandes, died. In addition, Wheeler assisted in the establishment of a German department with James Wallace, which eventually established German Wallace College on June 7, 1864.

=== Later years ===
Wheeler left Baldwin University in 1870 to become president of Iowa Wesleyan University, now called Iowa Wesleyan College. Wheeler served at the First Methodist Church in Keokuk, Iowa, and eventually moved to Mount Pleasant, Iowa, where he died on June 18, 1881.

== Legacy ==
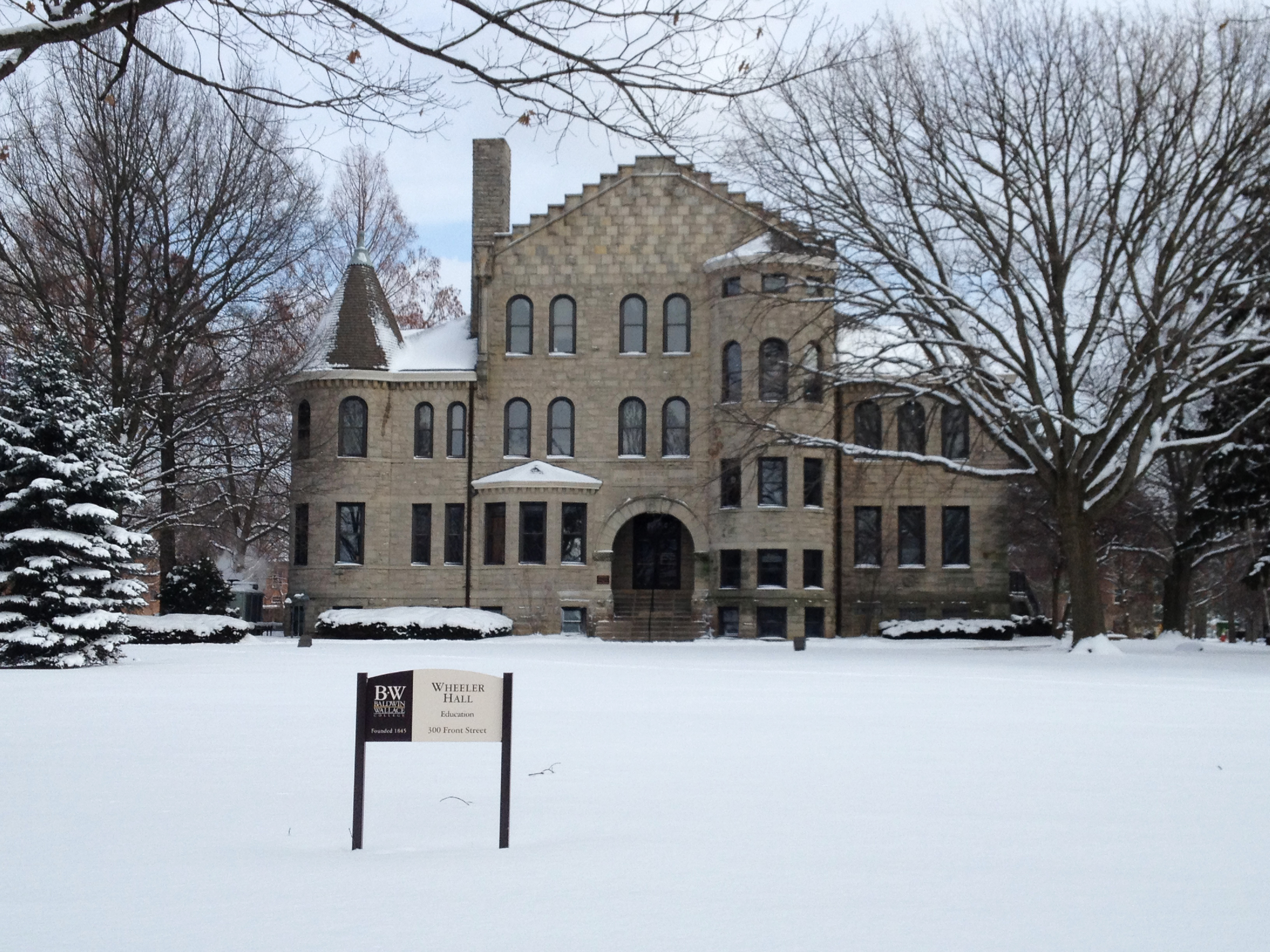
Building on BW's north campus named after Wheeler

Wheeler assisted in the establishment of the German Department at Baldwin Institute. This department led to the eventual development of German Wallace College. Eventually, due to the financial difficulty of both schools, German Wallace and Baldwin University would become Baldwin-Wallace College. Today Baldwin-Wallace College now is Baldwin Wallace University.

In 1872, Hulet Hall (named after Hulet's wife) was built using Berea sandstone, at an original cost of $10,000. Hulet was eventually torn down in 1972. Recitation Hall was built in 1891 (now called Wheeler Hall); the ground-breaking ceremony was led by Mary Baldwin, John's daughter. Wheeler hall is named after John Wheeler. Wheeler Hall is located on the university's north part of campus near Baldwin Library.

On December 1, 1978, John Wheeler's Home, located at 445 S. Rocky River Dr in Berea, Ohio, was added to the National Register of Historic Places.
