= Saarah Hameed Ahmed =

Indian pilot

Saarah Hameed
- Born: 22 April 1989; Bangalore
- Occupation: Pilot

Saarah Hameed Ahmed (born 22 April 1989) is an Indian pilot from Bangalore, Karnataka. As of March 2015, she worked for SpiceJet. According to a news report published by Hindustan Times, Saarah was the only known woman Muslim pilot in Indian aviation sector as of March 2015. The Hindu lists her as the first Muslim woman pilot in Karnataka.

Saarah later clarified that she had never claimed to be the first Indian Muslim woman pilot and was simply one amongst a few Muslim women pilots. She further clarified that she had never mentioned anything about Islamophobia or being treated badly.

== Background ==
Saarah Sabah Hameed Ahmed was born and raised in Bangalore, Karnataka. After completing a PUC at Jyothi Nivas College, in 2007 Ahmed enrolled in the Paris Air Flight Training School in Vero Beach, Florida. In the post 9/11 period of Islamophobia, she claims that most Muslim students were being denied US Visas, but she had little difficulty obtaining one.

According to Ahmed's father, in the traditional community in which she was raised, a woman's responsibility is to her home and children, with few seeking outside jobs without an escort. Ahmed did not initially receive support within the community and her family tried to discourage her, but they relented when she insisted and a friend of her father's who is a pilot with Southwest Airlines offered reassurances. After a year of study and logging 200 flight hours, Ahmed received her commercial pilot's license in 2008. She returned to India and undertook the process to convert her license to an Indian certification, which required both a waiting period and additional training in Lithuania to learn about specific commercial aircraft types. She has also said of the commercial aviation field that "male monopoly has been broken but parity in numbers would take some more time."

== Career ==
After completion of her Bachelor of Business Administration and some 1200 flying hours, she was recruited by SpiceJet in 2010 as a commercial pilot. She was the first Muslim woman to be chosen in the aviation sector and for nearly two years, remained the only female Muslim pilot out of the 600 women employed in the Indian aviation industry. Her accomplishment has been inspirational in her community, encouraging other Muslim women to enroll in pilot training.
