= Baldwin Boys' High School =

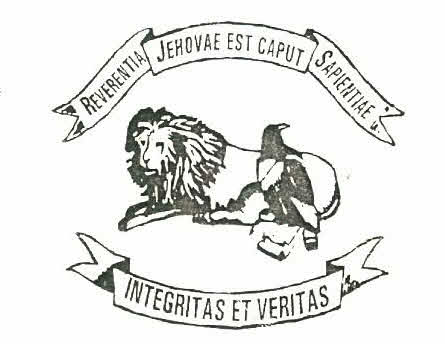
- The School Coat of Arms

Location
- 14, Hosur Road, Richmond Town; Bangalore, Karnataka, 560023; India; 12°57′44″N 77°36′22″E

Information
- Type: Private boarding school
- Motto: Reverentia Jehovae est Caput Sapientiae (Latin) (The fear of the Lord is the beginning of wisdom)
- Established: 1880; 146 years ago
- Founder: John Baldwin
- School board: Indian Certificate of Secondary Education (year 10); Indian School Certificate (year 12)
- Authority: Board of Governors
- Principal: Mrs. Indira Williams
- Faculty: 245 teachers and over 150 executive and support staff
- Gender: Boys
- Enrollment: approx. 6000
- Campus size: 10 acres (40,000 m^{2})
- Houses: Richard, Oldham, Buttrick, Toussaint, Pfeiffer, Weston, Andersen
- Colors: Red and blue
- Mascot: Lion and Eagle
- Publication: The Baldwinian
- Affiliation: Council for the Indian School Certificate Examinations
- Former Students: Old Baldwinian
- School Song: Shout all hail
- Website: baldwinboyshighschool.edu.in

Baldwin Boys' High School (abbreviated BBHS, informally referred to as Baldwins) is a private boys school for boarders and day scholars. This school was founded in 1880 in Bangalore, India.The school is run by the Methodist Church in India under the chairmanship of Bishop Dr.Anilkumar John Servand.

In 2018, there were complaints about pupils who were late having to stand outside, and the Karnataka State Commission for Protection of Child Rights asked the police to take action.

== Notable former pupils ==
- Rahman, actor
- Chiranjeevi Sarja, actor
