= Richmond Town Methodist Church =

Church in Bangalore, India

Coordinates: 12°57′48.16″N 77°36′12.6″E

Richmond Town Methodist Church (RTMC) is the first Methodist Church to be established in Bangalore in India. The church was started in 1875 by William Taylor on Kingston Road in what is now called Richmond Town. The many Methodist churches in Bangalore all originated from the Richmond Town Methodist Church.

There are different wings in the church that cater to all ages – Sunday school, Methodist Youth Fellowship, Women's Society for Christian Service (WSCS), Methodist Men and Senior Citizens. The church has a senior citizens' home on the campus.
