= Andaleeb Wajid =

English-language Indian novelist

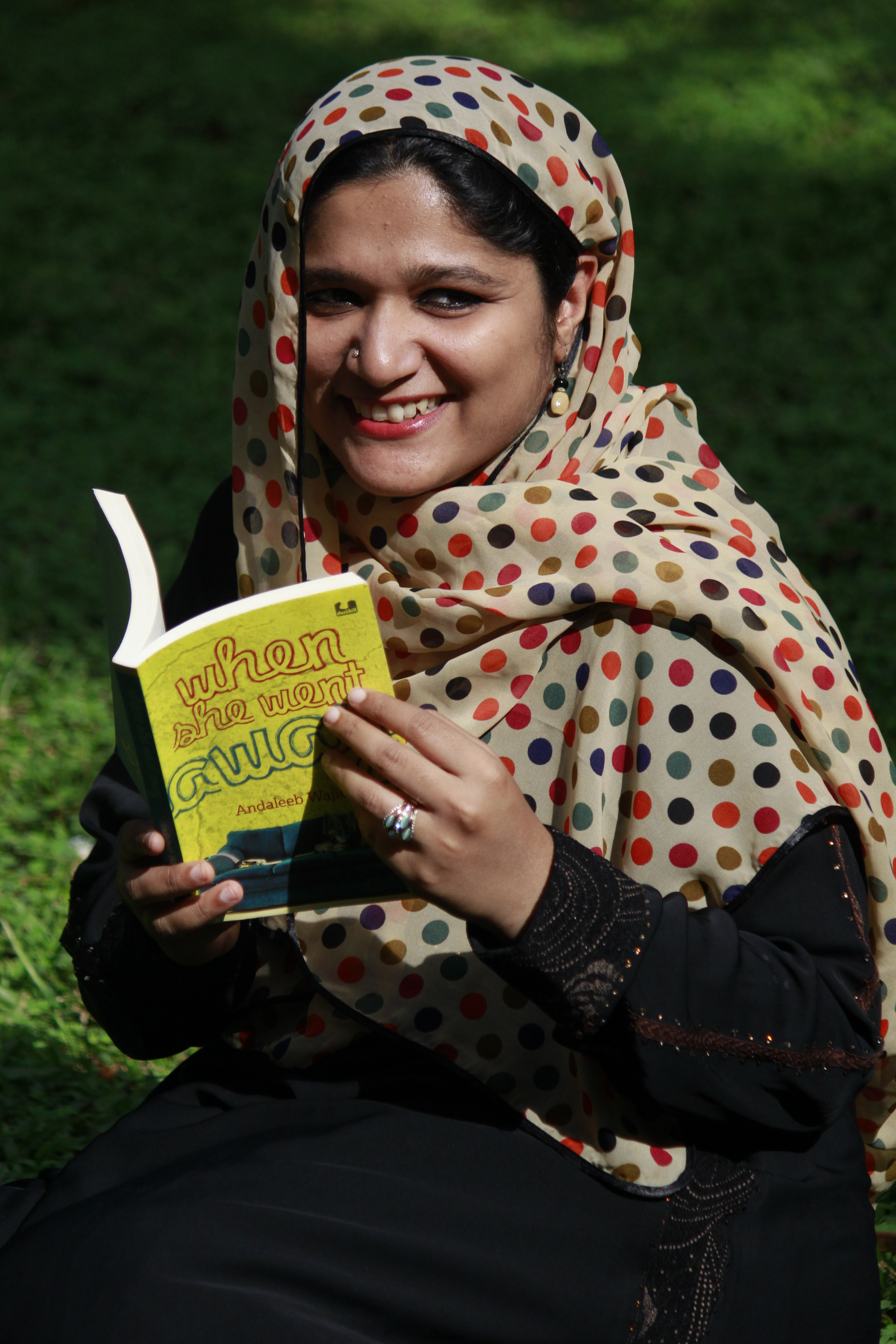
- Andaleeb Wajid
- Education: Jyoti Nivas College
- Occupation: Writer
- Known for: The Tamanna Trilogy; More Than Just Biryani

Andaleeb Wajid is a Bangalore-based writer.

== Personal life ==
She began writing at age 10, and studied at Baldwin Girls High School before joining Jyoti Nivas College. She is married and has two sons.

== Bibliography ==
=== Novels ===
- Kite Strings (2009)
- Blinkers Off (2011)
- My Brothers Wedding (2013)
- More than just biryani (2014)
- The Tamanna Trilogy (2014)
- When she went away (2016)
- Asmara's summer (2016)
- Twenty-Nine Going on Thirty
- House of Screams (2018)
