= John Baldwin (educator) =

American educator and philanthropist

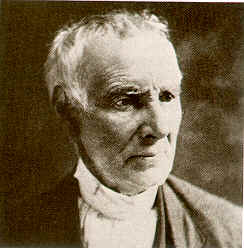
- John Baldwin
- Born: October 13, 1799; Branford, Connecticut, U.S.
- Died: December 28, 1884 (aged 85); Baldwin, Louisiana, U.S.
- Spouse: Mary Chappel

John Baldwin (October 13, 1799 – December 28, 1884) was an American educator, and the founder of Baldwin Institute (later Baldwin University) in Berea, Ohio, which would eventually merge into Baldwin–Wallace College, now Baldwin-Wallace University. He was also the founder of Baker University and Baldwin City, Kansas, and contributed money to start schools in Bangalore, India that are today called Baldwin Boys High School, Baldwin Girls High School and Baldwin Co-Education Extension High School.

Born in Connecticut, Baldwin originally was a teacher in Maryland and Connecticut before moving to Ohio in the late 1820s. He became part of the lyceum movement and situated himself in Berea, Ohio. He helped found an abortive utopian settlement at Berea in 1836. Seeing the dissolution of the Norwalk Seminary, he opened Baldwin Institute in 1846. Nine years later, the Institute became Baldwin University. He moved to Kansas around 1857, laying the foundation for Baldwin City, Kansas, as well as Baker University. In his later life, he purchased a Louisiana plantation and made contributions to education in India late in his life.

== Biography ==
=== Early life ===
John Baldwin was born in Branford, Connecticut on 13 October 1799 to Joseph Baldwin and Rosanna Malley. His mother was a well-educated woman, as well as intensely religious. She attempted to become a student at Yale University, but was not allowed because she was a woman. Due to this, John resolved to make no distinction between races or sexes should he ever found a school. His father enlisted in the Continental Army during the American Revolution as a private and left as a captain. When John turned eighteen, he joined the Methodist Church. As a student at a private school, he paid his way by chopping firewood, ringing the bell, and building fires. Afterwards, he became a teacher in Fishkill, New York, Maryland, and Litchfield, Connecticut. As a teacher in Maryland, his stance on slavery, as well as black people as a whole, was revealed. A mulatto boy was sent to his school daily as a servant for his master's son. Baldwin began to teach them in common. When the student's father found out about this, he demanded Baldwin not teach him any more, to which he replied, "I do not charge anything for teaching him" and continued to teach him.

=== Founding Berea ===
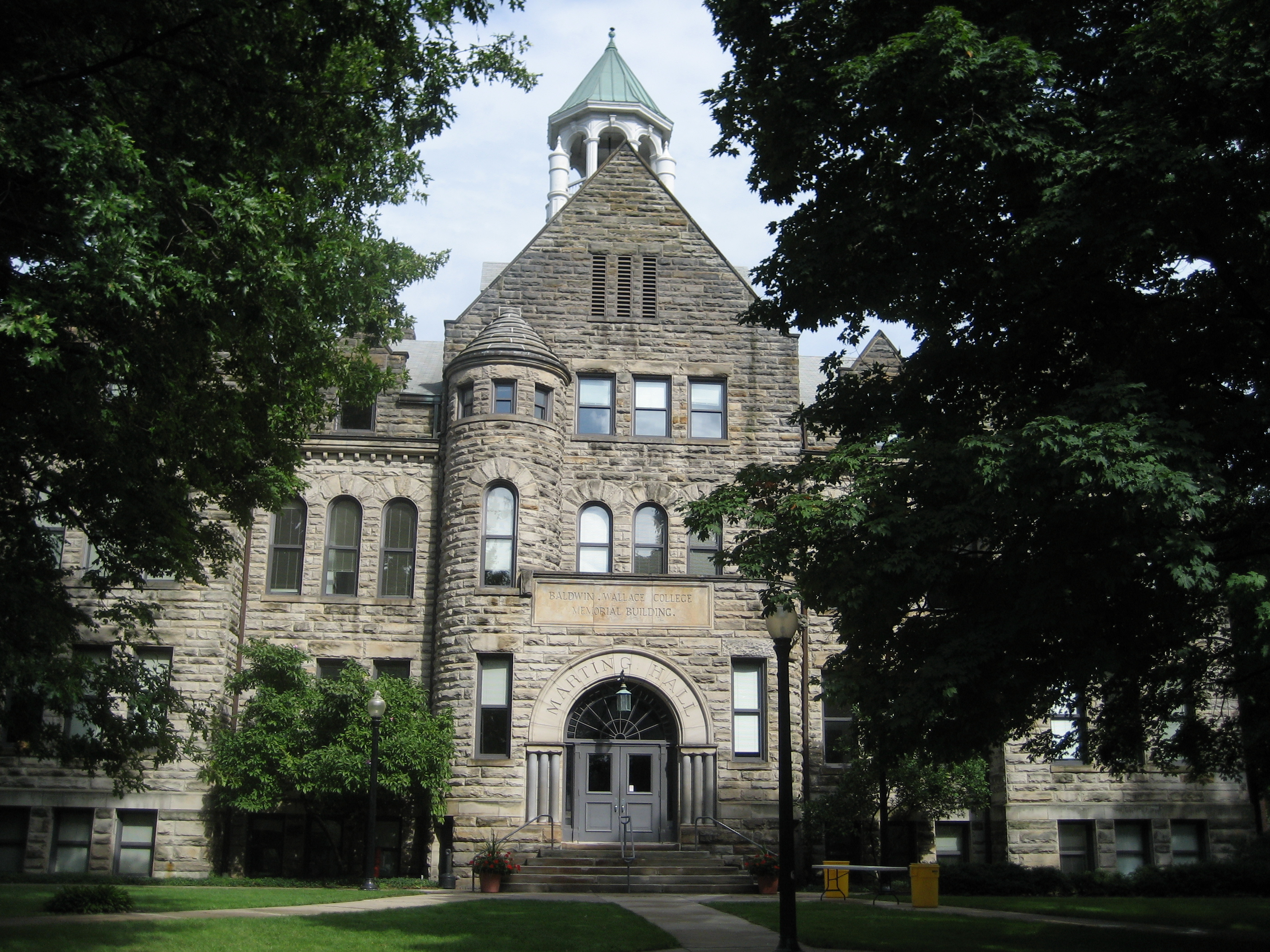
Marting Hall at Baldwin–Wallace College, on the site of Lyceum Square

After marrying Mary Chappel on January 31, 1828, they moved to Middleburg Township in Cuyahoga County, Ohio in April of that year. It was there that Baldwin joined forces with James Gilbrith, a disciple of Josiah Holbrook who wanted to found a lyceum village. In the village, which was founded in 1837 and situated just north of his farm, Baldwin ran the Lyceum Village School for five years until June 1842, when it went bankrupt. However, one day while walking home, he had an impulse to take a new route across the river on his farm. He noticed a grouping of exposed rocks, which would make superior grindstones. This was the beginning of the Berea grindstone industry. Baldwin shipped his grindstones to Cleveland by ox carts. After the Big Four Railroad was built from Cleveland to Cincinnati, Baldwin built a railroad that would connect his quarries to the Big Four Depot. It was then that Baldwin and the others of the Lyceum Village tried to think of a name for their new town. After Gilbrith proposed Tabor, John Baldwin suggested Berea, citing Acts 17:10–11. After a coin flip, Berea was chosen.

=== Baldwin Institute ===
In 1843, Baldwin noticed that the Norwalk Seminary, located in Norwalk, Ohio, was dissolving due to lack of funds. He approached Thomas Thompson, who was the elder of the Norwalk District (which included Cleveland and Berea), and asked him to visit Berea. At Baldwin's Old Red House, an agreement was made where Baldwin would create a campus on his farm similar to the Norwalk Seminary. Baldwin Institute officially opened on April 9, 1846. It was meant to open in 1845, but the process was delayed until the completion of a building on Baldwin's farm, which was erected by Baldwin himself, made of stone quarried on his farm and brick made of clay. The institute was open to people of all races, male or female, as Baldwin wanted. It became Baldwin University and was given a charter in 1855. The university later became Baldwin–Wallace College in 1913.

=== Life in Kensett, Iowa ===
At age fifty-eight, Baldwin desired to satisfy his nature of being a pioneer again by moving to Kansas, which was at that time a territory. He arrived as the brunt of the fighting in the territory was ending. Upon his arrival, he founded Baldwin City and built the first college building in the territory, which became the foundation for Baker University. He was in Kansas only for a short time when tragedy struck. On August 30, 1858, John's son Milton died unexpectedly after having been sick for only three days. Within a couple of years, he laid out a town, built a grist mill and a sawmill, and he turned over the town and college to the Methodist Conference and returned to Berea, although he continued to finance it.

=== Later years & family legacy ===
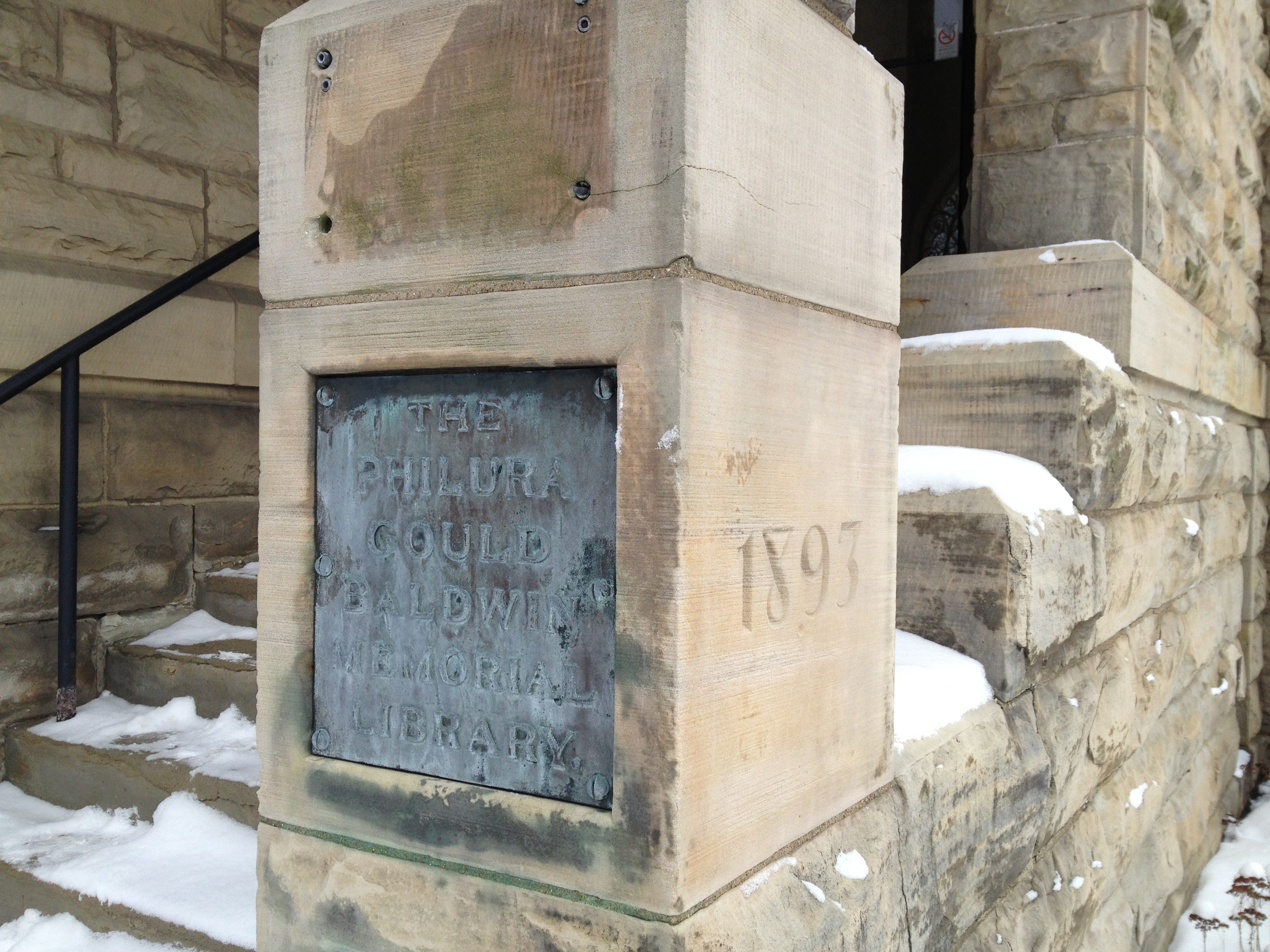
Cornerstone dedicating the Baldwin Library

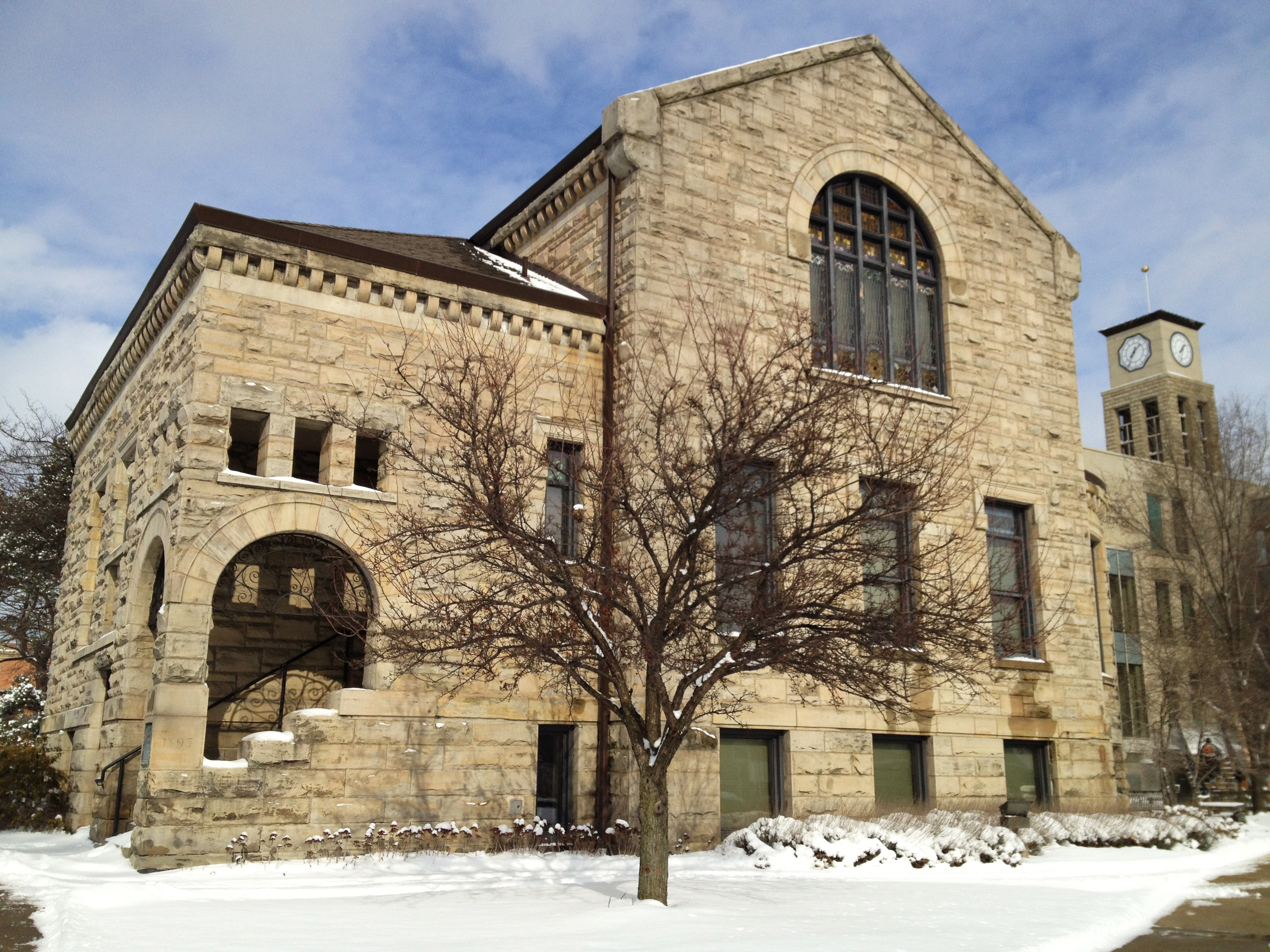
Baldwin Library

In 1867, Baldwin purchased the Darby plantation in Louisiana, a plantation of about 1,700 acres (6.9 km^{2}). At the age of eighty, Baldwin learned of the situation in India; there were large numbers of Europeans in India who could not get a proper education. The Baldwin High School for Boys and the Baldwin High School for Girls were then built in 1880. John Baldwin died at his home in Baldwin, Louisiana on Sunday, December 28, 1884, at 10 A.M. Baldwin's family even left their legacy on the campus long after Baldwin's death. A person of historical significance to the university's history is Philura Gould Baldwin. Philura Gould Baldwin graduated in 1886 and was the granddaughter of John Baldwin. Philura started the school's first library by collecting and cataloging books. Beyond this, Philura suggested the traditional colors of brown and gold for the school colors. These were also the school colors for Baldwin University, which still stand today. Philura died from consumption at age 26 (b. November 28, 1865; d. March 3, 1892). The Baldwin family donated funds for a library that was dedicated in her memory in June 1894. The Philura Gould Baldwin Library was eventually made part of the Malicky Center in the 1900s.

== Personal views ==
John Baldwin was a person whose views seemed to run counter to the conventional customs of the time. Despite his accomplishments, he never wrote a book, held public office, or even kept books. Although he was not an abolitionist by definition, he had no problem teaching blacks and whites as equals, as evident by his opening Baldwin Institute without regard to race or gender. His parents taught him to fear God, and he consequently devoted himself to living humbly and righteously, to being kind to the poor, and to joining the Methodist Church.
