= National Register of Historic Places listings in Cuyahoga County, Ohio =

Location of Cuyahoga County in Ohio

This is a list of the National Register of Historic Places listings in Cuyahoga County, Ohio.

This is intended to be a complete list of the properties and districts on the National Register of Historic Places in Cuyahoga County, Ohio, United States. Latitude and longitude coordinates are provided for many National Register properties and districts; these locations may be seen together in an online map.

There are 446 properties and districts listed on the National Register in the county, including 4 National Historic Landmarks. 167 of these properties and districts, including 1 National Historic Landmark, are located outside of Cleveland, and are listed here, while the properties and districts in Cleveland are listed separately. Three properties and districts are split between Cleveland and other parts of the county, and are thus included on both lists.

This National Park Service list is complete through NPS recent listings posted July 4, 2026.

== Current listings ==
=== Exclusive of Cleveland ===
	Name on the Register	Image	Date listed	Location	City or town	Description
1	Adams Bag Company Paper Mill and Sack Factory	Adams Bag Company Paper Mill and Sack Factory	July 3, 2012 (#12000391)	218 Cleveland St. 41°26′08″N 81°23′09″W	Chagrin Falls	
2	John and Maria Adams House	John and Maria Adams House	October 10, 1975 (#75001368)	7315 Columbia Rd., north of Olmsted Falls; 41°23′04″N 81°54′09″W	Olmsted Township	Private residence
3	Alcazar Hotel	Alcazar Hotel	April 17, 1979 (#79001805)	Surrey and Derbyshire Rds. 41°30′07″N 81°35′34″W	Cleveland Heights	
4	Aaron Aldrich House	Aaron Aldrich House	December 4, 1978 (#78002033)	30663 Lake Rd. 41°29′49″N 81°57′32″W	Bay Village	Private residence
5	Ambler Heights Historic District	Ambler Heights Historic District	August 22, 2002 (#02000883)	Roughly bounded by Martin Luther King, Jr. Boulevard, Cedar Glen, N. Park Boulevard, and along Harcourt Dr. 41°29′50″N 81°36′04″W	Cleveland Heights	
6	John M. Annis House	John M. Annis House	March 19, 1992 (#92000174)	9271 State Rd. 41°20′31″N 81°43′27″W	North Royalton	Private residence
7	Baldwin-Wallace College North Campus Historic District	Baldwin-Wallace College North Campus Historic District	January 23, 2013 (#12001210)	Bounded by Bagley & E. 5th Aves., Front & Beech Sts. 41°22′28″N 81°51′05″W	Berea	
8	Baldwin-Wallace College South Campus Historic District	Baldwin-Wallace College South Campus Historic District	June 7, 2010 (#10000315)	Seminary St. between School St. and Church St., Front St. to Beach St., variable west/east boundary; also 84, 114, 115, 125, 144 Tressel and 191 East Center Sts., 275 Eastland Rd. 41°22′05″N 81°51′06″W	Berea	Second set of addresses represent a boundary increase approved June 27, 2022
9	Bay View Hospital	Bay View Hospital	August 27, 1974 (#74001428)	23200 Lake Rd. 41°28′56″N 81°52′36″W	Bay Village	
10	Bedford Baptist Church	Bedford Baptist Church	December 27, 2002 (#02001618)	750 Broadway Ave. 41°23′24″N 81°32′03″W	Bedford	
11	Bedford Historic District	Bedford Historic District	July 14, 2004 (#04000712)	Roughly bounded by Willis St., Franklin St., Broadway Ave., and Columbus Rd. 41°23′27″N 81°32′06″W	Bedford	
12	Bedford Township Hall	Bedford Township Hall	May 27, 1975 (#02001455)	30 South Park St. 41°23′24″N 81°32′05″W	Bedford	
13	Berea District 7 School	Berea District 7 School	April 3, 1975 (#75001355)	323 E. Bagley Rd. 41°22′22″N 81°50′29″W	Berea	
14	Berea Union Depot	Berea Union Depot	November 21, 1980 (#80002976)	30 Depot St. 41°22′52″N 81°51′16″W	Berea	
15	Berea Village Founders Historic District		July 7, 2026 (#100012696)	The district includes 61 homes and one church located on a grid of interlacing streets: Seminary, East Grand, Spring, Liberty, Beech and Jacob Streets; 41°22′14″N 81°51′03″W	Berea	
16	Birdtown Historic District	Birdtown Historic District	June 27, 2007 (#07000634)	Roughly bounded by Magee Rd., Plover Rd., Halstead Rd., and Madison Ave. 41°28′30″N 81°46′35″W	Lakewood	
17	Elizabeth B. Blossom Subdivision Historic District	Elizabeth B. Blossom Subdivision Historic District	September 22, 1987 (#87001543)	Junction of Richmond and Cedar Rds. 41°29′57″N 81°30′19″W	Beachwood	
18	Elizabeth B. and Dudley S. Blossom Estate Service Compound	Elizabeth B. and Dudley S. Blossom Estate Service Compound	February 20, 2004 (#04000059)	24449 Cedar Rd. 41°30′06″N 81°30′22″W	Lyndhurst	
19	Chester and Frances Bolton House	Chester and Frances Bolton House	March 29, 1984 (#84002911)	1950 Richmond Rd. 41°30′28″N 81°30′13″W	Lyndhurst	
20	Brecksville-Northfield High Level Bridge	Brecksville-Northfield High Level Bridge	January 17, 1986 (#86000078)	State Route 82 and the Cuyahoga River; 41°19′17″N 81°35′16″W	Brecksville	Extends into Sagamore Hills Township in Summit County
21	Brecksville Town Hall	Brecksville Town Hall	July 2, 1973 (#73001404)	Public Sq. 41°19′15″N 81°37′41″W	Brecksville	
22	Brecksville Trailside Museum	Brecksville Trailside Museum	August 14, 1992 (#92000988)	Chippewa Creek Dr. southeast of its junction with State Route 82; 41°19′04″N 81°36′57″W	Brecksville	
23	John Hartness Brown House	John Hartness Brown House	November 7, 1976 (#76001389)	2380 Overlook Rd. 41°30′24″N 81°35′42″W	Cleveland Heights	Private residence
24	Buehl House	Buehl House	April 30, 1976 (#76001388)	118 E. Bridge St. 41°21′58″N 81°50′59″W	Berea	
25	Harold B. Burdick House	Harold B. Burdick House	September 17, 1974 (#74001434)	2424 Stratford Rd. 41°29′36″N 81°34′17″W	Cleveland Heights	Private residence
26	William Burt House	William Burt House	March 22, 1979 (#79000286)	9525 Brecksville Rd. 41°18′10″N 81°37′35″W	Brecksville	
27	John Carroll University North Quad Historic District	John Carroll University North Quad Historic District	January 23, 2013 (#12001211)	1 John Carroll Blvd. 41°29′20″N 81°31′59″W	University Heights	
28	Chagrin Falls East Side Historic District	Chagrin Falls East Side Historic District	June 14, 2013 (#13000387)	E. Washington and Philomethian Sts. 41°25′48″N 81°23′15″W	Chagrin Falls	
29	Chagrin Falls Township Hall	Chagrin Falls Township Hall	October 1, 1974 (#74001432)	83 N. Main St. 41°25′55″N 81°23′34″W	Chagrin Falls	
30	Chagrin Falls Triangle Park Commercial District	Chagrin Falls Triangle Park Commercial District	December 29, 1978 (#78002036)	Main, Franklin, and Washington Sts.; also at the junction of N. Main and E. Orange Sts., extending east and south 41°25′49″N 81°23′30″W	Chagrin Falls	Second set of boundaries represents a boundary increase
31	Chagrin Falls West Side District	Chagrin Falls West Side District	October 9, 1974 (#74001433)	Bounded by W. Washington, Church, Maple, and Franklin Sts. 41°25′46″N 81°23′33″W	Chagrin Falls	
32	Clague House	Clague House	January 11, 1976 (#76001408)	1371 Clague Rd. 41°28′00″N 81°52′55″W	Westlake	
33	Jared Clark House	Jared Clark House	August 1, 1975 (#75001357)	6241 Wallings Rd. 41°20′42″N 81°38′34″W	Broadview Heights	Private residence
34	Cleveland and Pittsburgh Railroad Bridge	Cleveland and Pittsburgh Railroad Bridge	July 24, 1975 (#75001351)	Tinker's Creek; 41°23′05″N 81°32′03″W	Bedford	
35	Clifton Park Lakefront District	Clifton Park Lakefront District	November 20, 1974 (#74001459)	Roughly bounded by Clifton Boulevard, the Rocky River, Lake Erie, and Webb Rd. 41°29′25″N 81°49′38″W	Lakewood	
36	Clifton Park South Historic District		March 18, 2021 (#100006265)	Portions of Clifton, Forest, and Lake Rds., Captain’s Cove and West Clifton Blvd. 41°29′19″N 81°49′35″W	Lakewood	
37	Commodore Apartment Building	Commodore Apartment Building	April 21, 1983 (#83001951)	15610 Van Aken Boulevard; 41°27′59″N 81°34′08″W	Shaker Heights	
38	Cooley Farms	Cooley Farms	August 8, 1979 (#79001823)	North of Warrensville Heights off State Route 175; 41°27′02″N 81°29′56″W	Beachwood	
39	Jonas Coonrad House	Jonas Coonrad House	July 24, 1979 (#79000287)	Southeast of Brecksville at 10340 Riverview Rd. 41°16′50″N 81°34′21″W	Brecksville	
40	Samuel Danalds House	Samuel Danalds House	August 11, 1979 (#09000095)	6511 Ruple Rd. 41°23′35″N 81°52′33″W	Brook Park	
41	Erastus Day House	Erastus Day House	May 8, 1979 (#79001812)	16807 Hilliard Rd. 41°28′29″N 81°48′50″W	Lakewood	Private residence
42	Grant Deming's Forest Hill Allotment Historic District	Grant Deming's Forest Hill Allotment Historic District	April 13, 2010 (#10000189)	Woodward Ave., Lincoln Boulevard, Edgehill Rd., Parkway Dr., and Redwood Rd. 41°30′25″N 81°34′12″W	Cleveland Heights	
43	Detroit Avenue Bridge	Detroit Avenue Bridge	February 23, 1973 (#73001428)	Detroit Ave. at the Rocky River; 41°28′57″N 81°49′53″W	Lakewood and Rocky River	
44	Detroit-Warren Building	Detroit-Warren Building	May 15, 1986 (#86001055)	14801-14813 Detroit Ave. 41°29′06″N 81°47′59″W	Lakewood	
45	Alonzo Drake House	Alonzo Drake House	November 28, 1978 (#78002047)	24262 Broadway; 41°21′50″N 81°30′26″W	Oakwood	Private residence
46	Carl Droppers House		March 31, 2023 (#100008761)	345 Prospect Rd. 41°21′31″N 81°51′37″W	Berea	Private residence
47	Hezekiah Dunham House	Hezekiah Dunham House	June 18, 1975 (#75001352)	729 Broadway; 41°23′27″N 81°32′04″W	Bedford	
48	East Cleveland District 9 School	East Cleveland District 9 School	July 26, 1979 (#79001806)	14391 Superior Rd. 41°30′34″N 81°34′07″W	Cleveland Heights	
49	Euclid Golf Allotment	Euclid Golf Allotment	August 23, 2002 (#02000887)	Roughly bounded by Cedar Rd., Coventry Rd., Scarborough Rd., W. St. James Parkway, and Ardleigh Dr. 41°29′51″N 81°35′11″W	Cleveland Heights	
50	Euclid Heights Historic District	Euclid Heights Historic District	October 31, 2012 (#12000897)	Mayfield Rd., Coventry Rd., Cedar Rd., and Overlook Lane; 41°30′23″N 81°34′57″W	Cleveland Heights	
51	Fairhill Road Village Historic District	Fairhill Road Village Historic District	May 10, 1990 (#90000758)	12309-12511 Fairhill Rd. 41°29′36″N 81°35′47″W	Cleveland Heights	Extends into Cleveland
52	Fairmount Boulevard District	Fairmount Boulevard District	December 12, 1976 (#76001391)	2485-3121 Fairmount Boulevard; 41°29′37″N 81°34′50″W	Cleveland Heights	
53	Fairmount Heights Historic District		February 12, 2026 (#100011972)	Fairmount Blvd, Idlewood, Shaker, Taylor, and E. Monmouth roads 41°29′16″N 81°33′55″W	Cleveland Heights	
54	Fairview Community Park Historic District	Fairview Community Park Historic District	June 14, 2013 (#13000388)	21077 N. Park Dr. 41°26′24″N 81°51′14″W	Fairview Park	
55	Falls River Road	Falls River Road	April 28, 2000 (#00000421)	Falls Rd. 41°26′30″N 81°23′24″W	Chagrin Falls, Chagrin Falls Township, Hunting Valley, and Moreland Hills	
56	First Church of Christ in Euclid	First Church of Christ in Euclid	November 28, 1978 (#78002044)	16200 Euclid Ave. 41°32′40″N 81°34′01″W	East Cleveland	
57	First Universalist Church of Olmsted	First Universalist Church of Olmsted	November 25, 1980 (#80002983)	5050 Porter Rd. 41°24′58″N 81°55′45″W	North Olmsted	
58	Forest Hill Historic District	Forest Hill Historic District	August 14, 1986 (#86001662)	Roughly bounded by Glynn Rd., Northdale Boulevard and Cleviden Rd., Mt. Vernon Boulevard and Wyatt Rd., and Lee Boulevard; 41°31′41″N 81°34′07″W	Cleveland Heights and East Cleveland	
59	Forest Hill Park	Forest Hill Park	February 27, 1998 (#98000072)	Roughly along Lee Boulevard and Superior, Terrace, and Mayfield Rds. 41°31′20″N 81°34′37″W	Cleveland Heights and East Cleveland	
60	Forest Hill Realty Sales Office	Forest Hill Realty Sales Office	June 21, 2007 (#07000580)	2419 Lee Boulevard; 41°31′05″N 81°34′12″W	Cleveland Heights	
61	Fort Hill	Fort Hill	July 25, 1974 (#74001460)	East of North Olmsted off State Route 252; 41°24′33″N 81°53′14″W	North Olmsted	
62	Stephen Frazee House	Stephen Frazee House	May 4, 1976 (#76000211)	7733 Canal Rd. 41°21′10″N 81°35′34″W	Valley View	
63	John Froelich House	John Froelich House	July 30, 1974 (#74001461)	7095 Broadview Rd. 41°22′23″N 81°41′04″W	Seven Hills	
64	Fuller-Bramley House	Fuller-Bramley House	October 7, 1999 (#99001242)	7489 Brecksville Rd. 41°21′31″N 81°38′05″W	Independence	
65	Daniel Gabel House	Daniel Gabel House	May 23, 1978 (#78002049)	1102 E. Ridgewood Dr. 41°23′31″N 81°40′36″W	Seven Hills	Private residence
66	Garfield Memorial	Garfield Memorial	April 11, 1973 (#73001411)	12316 Euclid Ave. in Lake View Cemetery; 41°30′36″N 81°35′29″W	Cleveland Heights	Extends into Cleveland
67	Garfield Terrace Apartments		December 15, 2021 (#100007225)	13344 Euclid Ave. 41°31′20″N 81°35′25″W	East Cleveland	
68	Gates Mills Historic District	Gates Mills Historic District	October 9, 1991 (#91001491)	Roughly along Berkshire, Chagrin River, Epping, Old Mill, and Sherman Rds. 41°31′38″N 81°24′32″W	Gates Mills	
69	Gates Mills Methodist Episcopal Church	Gates Mills Methodist Episcopal Church	July 18, 1975 (#75001367)	Old Mill Rd. off U.S. Route 322; 41°31′04″N 81°24′17″W	Gates Mills	
70	Holsey Gates House	Holsey Gates House	June 30, 1975 (#75001354)	762 Broadway; 41°23′23″N 81°32′02″W	Bedford	
71	Edmund Gleason House	Edmund Gleason House	December 18, 1978 (#78000377)	7243 Canal Rd. 41°22′02″N 81°36′38″W	Valley View	
72	Grand Pacific Hotel	Grand Pacific Hotel	October 10, 1975 (#75001369)	8112 Columbia Rd. 41°22′27″N 81°54′08″W	Olmsted Falls	
73	Greenwood Farm	Greenwood Farm	February 23, 2016 (#16000041)	264 Richmond Rd. 41°34′23″N 81°29′41″W	Richmond Heights	
74	Gwinn Estate	Gwinn Estate	October 1, 1974 (#74001430)	12407 Lakeshore Boulevard; 41°33′36″N 81°35′58″W	Bratenahl	(Although marked as a "University"), it is still a private residence.
75	Harvey Hackenberg House	Harvey Hackenberg House	July 7, 1983 (#83001952)	1568 Grace Ave. 41°28′48″N 81°46′50″W	Lakewood	Private residence
76	The Hangar	The Hangar	January 9, 1986 (#86000032)	24400 Cedar Rd. 41°29′57″N 81°30′19″W	Beachwood	
77	Howard M. Hanna Jr. House	Howard M. Hanna Jr. House	July 24, 1974 (#74001431)	11505 Lakeshore Boulevard; 41°33′21″N 81°36′34″W	Bratenahl	Private residence
78	E.F. Hauserman Co. Administration, Engineering & Research Building		August 30, 2024 (#100010756)	5711 Grant Avenue; 41°26′20″N 81°38′55″W	Cuyahoga Heights	
79	Heights Rockefeller Building	Heights Rockefeller Building	May 15, 1986 (#86001058)	3091 Mayfield Rd. 41°30′58″N 81°34′08″W	Cleveland Heights	
80	Albert W. Henn Mansion	Albert W. Henn Mansion	April 28, 2000 (#00000422)	23131 Lake Shore Boulevard; 41°36′56″N 81°31′18″W	Euclid	
81	Phillip Henninger House	Phillip Henninger House	August 28, 2003 (#03000859)	5757 Broadview Rd. 41°24′23″N 81°41′27″W	Parma	
82	Robert W. Henry House	Robert W. Henry House	December 8, 1978 (#78002048)	6607 Pearl Rd. 41°22′58″N 81°46′43″W	Parma Heights	
83	Homestead Theatre Block		June 18, 2021 (#100006652)	11794-11816 Detroit Ave. 41°29′02″N 81°46′14″W	Lakewood	
84	John Honam House	John Honam House	April 13, 1977 (#77001054)	14710 Lake Ave. 41°29′36″N 81°47′55″W	Lakewood	
85	John Huntington Pumping Tower	John Huntington Pumping Tower	February 28, 1979 (#79001798)	28600 Lake Rd. 41°29′26″N 81°56′02″W	Bay Village	
86	Independence Presbyterian Church	Independence Presbyterian Church	April 13, 1977 (#77001053)	State Route 21; 41°22′55″N 81°38′30″W	Independence	
87	Inglewood Historic District	Inglewood Historic District	April 15, 2009 (#09000210)	Inglewood Dr., Oakridge Dr., Cleveland Heights Boulevard, Yellowstone and Glenwood Rds., and Quilliams; 41°31′24″N 81°32′50″W	Cleveland Heights	
88	Jaite Mill Historic District	Jaite Mill Historic District	May 21, 1979 (#79000288)	Southeast of Brecksville at Riverview and Vaughan Rds. 41°17′18″N 81°34′24″W	Brecksville	Extends into Sagamore Hills Township in Summit County
89	Gideon Keyt House	Gideon Keyt House	June 1, 1982 (#82003560)	Chagrin River and Deerfield Rds. 41°30′50″N 81°24′01″W	Gates Mills	Private residence
90	William Knapp House	William Knapp House	March 19, 1979 (#79000289)	7101 Canal Rd. 41°22′20″N 81°36′42″W	Valley View	
91	Dr. William A. Knowlton House	Dr. William A. Knowlton House	December 4, 1978 (#78002035)	8937 Highland Dr. 41°19′11″N 81°37′49″W	Brecksville	Private residence
92	Joseph Kuenzer, II, House	Joseph Kuenzer, II, House	August 13, 1974 (#74001458)	2345 Rockside Rd. 41°24′13″N 81°40′19″W	Seven Hills	Private residence
93	E.J. Kulas Estate Historic District	E.J. Kulas Estate Historic District	March 23, 1988 (#88000206)	W. Hill Dr. 41°32′00″N 81°25′04″W	Gates Mills	Kulas Estate main house remains privately owned
94	Lakewood Downtown Historic District	Lakewood Downtown Historic District	September 23, 2020 (#100005539)	Detroit Ave., roughly bounded by Bunts Rd. and Hall Ave., plus Warren Rd., roughly bounded by Detroit Ave. and Franklin Blvd. 41°29′06″N 81°48′00″W	Lakewood	
95	Samuel Lay House	Samuel Lay House	June 20, 1979 (#79001814)	7622 Columbia Rd. 41°22′48″N 81°54′13″W	Olmsted Falls	
96	Lilly House	Lilly House	April 12, 2006 (#06000270)	27946 Center Ridge Rd. 41°26′42″N 81°55′55″W	Westlake	
97	Lock No. 37 and Spillway	Lock No. 37 and Spillway	December 11, 1979 (#79000290)	Fitzwater Rd. 41°21′24″N 81°35′50″W	Valley View	
98	Lock No. 38 and Spillway	Lock No. 38 and Spillway	December 11, 1979 (#79000291)	Hillside Rd. 41°22′21″N 81°36′46″W	Valley View	
99	Lock No. 39 and Spillway	Lock No. 39 and Spillway	December 11, 1979 (#79000292)	Canal Rd. 41°23′25″N 81°37′30″W	Valley View	
100	Lock Tender's House and Inn	Lock Tender's House and Inn	December 11, 1979 (#79000293)	7104 Canal Rd. 41°22′21″N 81°36′47″W	Valley View	
101	Look About Lodge	Look About Lodge	April 12, 2006 (#06000271)	37374 Miles Rd. 41°25′25″N 81°25′18″W	Bentleyville	
102	Lyceum Village Square And German Wallace College	Lyceum Village Square And German Wallace College	October 29, 1975 (#75001356)	Seminary St. 41°22′06″N 81°51′06″W	Berea	
103	George March House	George March House	April 20, 1978 (#78002037)	126 E. Washington St. 41°25′47″N 81°23′14″W	Chagrin Falls	
104	Mayfield Heights Historic District	Mayfield Heights Historic District	September 17, 2015 (#15000611)	Caldwell and Preyer Aves., Rock Ct., Euclid Heights Boulevard, and Hampshire, Mayfield, Middlehurst, Radnor, and Somerton Rds. 41°30′36″N 81°34′34″W	Cleveland Heights	
105	Duncan McFarland House	Duncan McFarland House	November 21, 2001 (#01001258)	35069 Cannon Rd. 41°24′34″N 81°25′23″W	Bentleyville	
106	NASA Lewis Research Center-Development Engineering Building & Annex	NASA Lewis Research Center-Development Engineering Building & Annex	August 15, 2016 (#16000599)	21000 Brookpark Rd. 41°25′11″N 81°51′10″W	Fairview Park	
107	Nela Park	Nela Park	May 29, 1975 (#75001365)	Entrance at 1901 Noble Rd. 41°32′28″N 81°33′32″W	East Cleveland	
108	James Nicholson House	James Nicholson House	August 24, 1979 (#79001813)	13335 Detroit Ave. 41°29′04″N 81°46′59″W	Lakewood	
109	North Olmsted Town Hall	North Olmsted Town Hall	November 25, 1980 (#80002984)	5186 Dover Center Rd. 41°24′51″N 81°55′27″W	North Olmsted	
110	North Union Shaker Site	North Union Shaker Site	August 13, 1974 (#74001446)	Along Shaker Run below Upper Shaker Lake; 41°29′00″N 81°33′50″W	Shaker Heights	
111	Julia Carter Northrop House	Julia Carter Northrop House	October 14, 1975 (#75001370)	7872 Columbia Rd. 41°22′36″N 81°54′12″W	Olmsted Falls	Private residence
112	Notre Dame College of Ohio	Notre Dame College of Ohio	December 8, 1983 (#83004267)	4545 College Rd. 41°30′27″N 81°30′56″W	South Euclid	
113	Oakwood Club Subdivision Historic District		February 5, 2021 (#100006098)	1538-1688 Oakwood Dr., 1598,1681 Wood Rd. 41°30′57″N 81°32′33″W	Cleveland Heights	
114	Ohio and Erie Canal	Ohio and Erie Canal	November 13, 1966 (#66000607)	State Route 631 (Canal Rd./Valley View Rd.); 41°22′14″N 81°36′59″W	Valley View	Extends into Summit County
115	Old Center School	Old Center School	April 3, 1973 (#73001426)	784 S.O.M. Center Rd. 41°32′24″N 81°26′21″W	Mayfield	
116	Old District 10 Schoolhouse	Old District 10 Schoolhouse	October 15, 1973 (#73001427)	Corner of Sheldon and Fry Rds. 41°23′18″N 81°48′54″W	Middleburg Heights	
117	Old Euclid District 4 Schoolhouse	Old Euclid District 4 Schoolhouse	April 16, 1980 (#80002982)	Richmond Rd. 41°31′06″N 81°29′53″W	Lyndhurst	
118	Olmsted Falls Depot	Olmsted Falls Depot	August 10, 2000 (#00000963)	25802 Garfield Rd. 41°22′29″N 81°54′21″W	Olmsted Falls	
119	Olmsted Falls Historic District	Olmsted Falls Historic District	July 14, 2000 (#00000798)	Roughly bounded by Bagley Rd., Brookside Dr., the Rocky River, and Nobottom Rd. 41°22′37″N 81°54′00″W	Olmsted Falls and Olmsted Township	
120	Overlook Road Carriage House District	Overlook Road Carriage House District	May 6, 1974 (#74001449)	1-5 Herrick Mews; 41°30′12″N 81°35′50″W	Cleveland Heights	
121	Packard-Doubler House	Packard-Doubler House	March 9, 1979 (#79000294)	7634 Riverview Rd. 41°21′18″N 81°36′12″W	Independence	
122	Park Synagogue	Park Synagogue	August 15, 2024 (#100010658)	3300 Mayfield Rd; 41°30′58″N 81°33′41″W	Cleveland Heights	The congregation's former building, not its current one.
123	Jay M. Pickands House	Jay M. Pickands House	August 24, 1979 (#79001799)	9619 Lakeshore Boulevard; 41°32′45″N 81°37′22″W	Bratenahl	Private residence
124	Alanson Pomeroy House	Alanson Pomeroy House	June 20, 1975 (#75001371)	Pearl Rd. at Westwood Dr. 41°18′54″N 81°50′09″W	Strongsville	
125	Reidy Bros. & Flanigan Building	Reidy Bros. & Flanigan Building	October 2, 2018 (#100002999)	11730 Detroit Ave. 41°29′02″N 81°46′12″W	Lakewood	
126	Charles B. Rich House	Charles B. Rich House	February 22, 1979 (#79000295)	9367 Brecksville Rd. 41°18′26″N 81°37′36″W	Brecksville	
127	Rose Hill and Community House	Rose Hill and Community House	May 13, 1994 (#94000413)	Junction of Cahoon and Lake Rds. 41°29′16″N 81°55′36″W	Bay Village	
128	Roundwood Manor at Daisy Hill Farm		March 22, 2019 (#100003526)	3450 Roundwood Rd. 41°27′53″N 81°25′45″W	Hunting Valley	
129	St. Joseph Convent and Academy Complex	St. Joseph Convent and Academy Complex	April 12, 2006 (#06000272)	12215 Granger Rd. 41°25′05″N 81°35′54″W	Garfield Heights	
130	St. Paul's Episcopal Church of East Cleveland	St. Paul's Episcopal Church of East Cleveland	October 18, 1984 (#84000130)	15837 Euclid Ave. 41°32′31″N 81°34′13″W	East Cleveland	
131	Shaker Farm Historic District	Shaker Farm Historic District	February 15, 2012 (#12000032)	Roughly bounded by Scarborough, Colchester, St. James, Roxboro, N. Park, Fairmount, Idlewood, E. Monmouth, and Lee Sts. 41°29′28″N 81°34′23″W	Cleveland Heights	
132	Shaker Village Historic District	Shaker Village Historic District	May 31, 1984 (#84003650)	Roughly bounded by Fairmount and Lomond Boulevards and Green, Warrensville Center, Becket, and Coventry Rds.; also roughly bounded by Lomond Boulevard, Lytel Rd., Scottsdale Boulevard, and Lindholm Rd. 41°28′33″N 81°33′11″W	Cleveland Heights and Shaker Heights	Extends into Cleveland
133	Shore High School	Shore High School	February 10, 2000 (#00000097)	291 E. 222nd St. 41°36′25″N 81°31′35″W	Euclid	
134	Russ and Holland Snow Houses	Russ and Holland Snow Houses	September 28, 1982 (#82001873)	12911 and 13114 Snowville Rd. 41°16′59″N 81°35′39″W	Brecksville	
135	South Park Site	South Park Site	June 22, 1976 (#76000212)	On a promontory above the western bank of the Cuyahoga River, 7 miles (11 km) from Lake Erie; 41°22′43″N 81°37′20″W	Independence	
136	Stadium Square Historic District	Stadium Square Historic District	April 27, 2020 (#100005214)	South Taylor Rd., Superior Park Dr. 41°30′26″N 81°33′27″W	Cleveland Heights	
137	Station Road Bridge	Station Road Bridge	March 7, 1979 (#79000312)	East of Brecksville at the Cuyahoga River; 41°19′10″N 81°35′16″W	Brecksville	Extends into Summit County
138	Lyman Stearns Farm	Lyman Stearns Farm	October 1, 1981 (#81000431)	6975 Ridge Rd. 41°22′30″N 81°43′43″W	Parma	
139	Stebbens Farm	Stebbens Farm	April 17, 1996 (#96000381)	8255 Riverview Rd. 41°20′12″N 81°35′56″W	Brecksville	
140	Valerius C. Stone House	Valerius C. Stone House	December 22, 1978 (#78002050)	21706 Lunn Rd. 41°17′52″N 81°51′56″W	Strongsville	
141	Joseph Stoneman House	Joseph Stoneman House	May 29, 1975 (#75001358)	18 E. Orange St. 41°25′57″N 81°23′30″W	Chagrin Falls	
142	John Stoughton Strong House	John Stoughton Strong House	November 24, 1980 (#80002985)	18910 Westwood St. 41°18′56″N 81°50′04″W	Strongsville	
143	Jacob Strong House	Jacob Strong House	July 20, 2023 (#100009131)	18829 Fairmount Blvd. 41°29′12″N 81°32′51″W	Shaker Heights	Private residence
144	Strongsville Town Hall	Strongsville Town Hall	March 6, 2008 (#08000147)	18825 Royalton Rd. 41°18′51″N 81°50′02″W	Strongsville	
145	Taylor Mansion-Lakehurst	Taylor Mansion-Lakehurst	July 10, 1986 (#86001573)	193 Bratenahl Rd. 41°33′03″N 81°36′51″W	Bratenahl	
146	William E. Telling House	William E. Telling House	October 16, 1974 (#74001463)	4645 Mayfield Rd. 41°31′12″N 81°30′46″W	South Euclid	
147	Temple on the Heights	Temple on the Heights	March 29, 1984 (#84003653)	3130 Mayfield Rd. 41°30′57″N 81°34′20″W	Cleveland Heights	
148	Terra Vista Archeological District	Terra Vista Archeological District	May 23, 1978 (#78000378)	On the edge of a bluff above the Cuyahoga River, north of its confluence with Tinkers Creek; 41°22′06″N 81°36′37″W	Valley View	
149	W.A. Thorp House	W.A. Thorp House	December 4, 1978 (#78002046)	6183-6185 Mayfield Rd. 41°31′14″N 81°27′24″W	Mayfield Heights	
150	Tinkers Creek Aqueduct	Tinkers Creek Aqueduct	December 11, 1979 (#79000296)	Tinkers Creek; 41°21′53″N 81°36′33″W	Valley View	
151	Tower East	Tower East	February 22, 2014 (#14000029)	20600 Chagrin Boulevard; 41°27′50″N 81°32′04″W	Shaker Heights	
152	Tremaine-Gallagher Residence	Tremaine-Gallagher Residence	October 30, 1973 (#73001419)	3001 Fairmount Boulevard; 41°29′18″N 81°34′18″W	Cleveland Heights	Private residence
153	Abraham Ulyatt House	Abraham Ulyatt House	February 27, 1979 (#79000297)	6579 Canal Rd. 41°23′10″N 81°37′11″W	Valley View	
154	Valley Railway Historic District	Valley Railway Historic District	May 17, 1985 (#85001123)	Cuyahoga Valley between Rockside Rd. at the Cuyahoga Valley National Park and Howard St. at Little Cuyahoga Valley; 41°13′38″N 81°34′13″W	Brecksville and Independence	Extends into Summit County
155	Vaughn Site (33CU65)	Vaughn Site (33CU65)	November 12, 1987 (#87001902)	Near Cuyahoga Valley National Park headquarters 41°17′20″N 81°34′19″W	Brecksville	
156	Richard Vaughn Farm	Richard Vaughn Farm	March 12, 1993 (#93000081)	9570 Riverview Rd. 41°18′03″N 81°34′58″W	Brecksville	
157	Villa San Bernardo Historic District	Villa San Bernardo Historic District	September 1, 2015 (#15000559)	1160 Broadway Ave. 41°22′50″N 81°31′19″W	Bedford	
158	Moses Warren House	Moses Warren House	October 22, 1974 (#74001462)	3535 Ingleside Rd. 41°27′48″N 81°33′19″W	Shaker Heights	
159	Westerly Apartments	Westerly Apartments	September 27, 2013 (#13000841)	14300 Detroit Ave. 41°29′09″N 81°47′38″W	Lakewood	
160	Hotel Westlake	Hotel Westlake	October 20, 1983 (#83004278)	19000 Lake Rd. 41°29′02″N 81°49′54″W	Rocky River	
161	John Wheeler House	John Wheeler House	December 1, 1978 (#78002034)	445 S. Rocky River Dr. 41°21′28″N 81°50′51″W	Berea	Private residence
162	George W. Whitney House	George W. Whitney House	October 22, 1974 (#74001429)	330 S. Rocky River Dr. 41°21′29″N 81°51′07″W	Berea	Private residence
163	William Tricker Inc. Historic District	William Tricker Inc. Historic District	March 2, 2001 (#01000200)	7125 Tanglewood Dr. 41°23′20″N 81°38′24″W	Independence	
164	Wilson Feed Mill	Wilson Feed Mill	December 17, 1979 (#79000298)	7604 Canal Rd. 41°21′22″N 81°35′48″W	Valley View	
165	Wilson's Mills Settlement District	Wilson's Mills Settlement District	May 29, 1980 (#80002981)	Chagrin River Rd. 41°32′56″N 81°24′55″W	Gates Mills	
166	Woodland-Larchmere Commercial Historic District	Woodland-Larchmere Commercial Historic District	September 1, 2015 (#15000560)	12019-13165 Larchmere and 2618 N. Moreland; 41°29′15″N 81°35′35″W	Shaker Heights	Extends into Cleveland

== Former listing ==
	Name on the Register	Image	Date listed	Date removed	Location	City or town	Description
1	Calvin Gilbert House		December 4, 1974 (#74002343)	November 10, 1975	6344 SOM Center Rd.	Solon	

== See also ==
- List of National Historic Landmarks in Ohio
- Listings in neighboring counties: Geauga, Lake, Lorain, Medina, Portage, Summit
- National Register of Historic Places listings in Ohio
