= List of Baldwin Wallace University buildings =

The following is a list of buildings at Baldwin Wallace University in Berea, Ohio. BW is home to many notable structures and the multi-building BW South Campus Historic District and the BW North Campus Historic District on the National Register of Historic Places.

== Campus ==
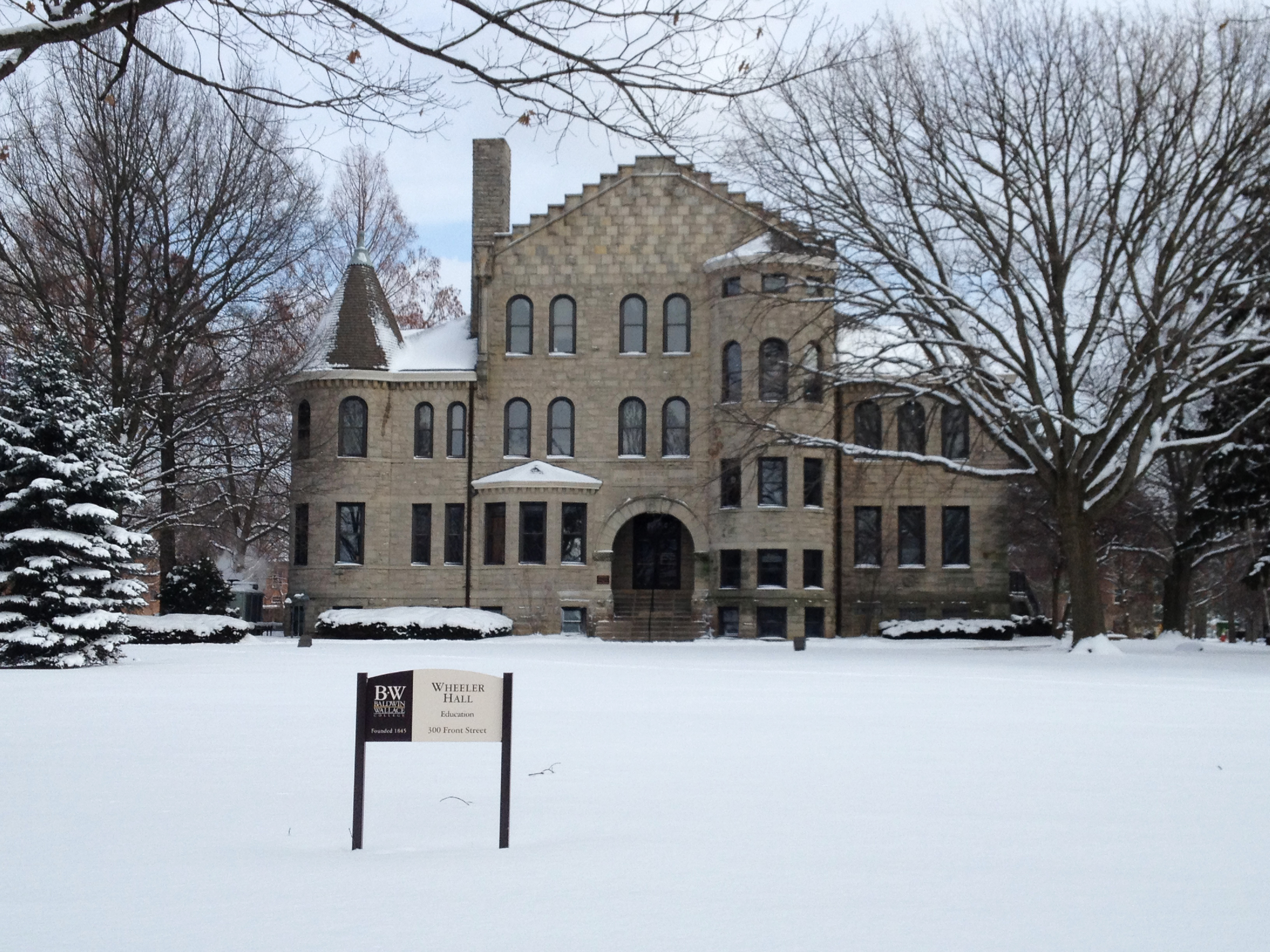
Wheeler Hall is one of several buildings part of the North Campus Historic District

The campus is located in Berea, Ohio, a suburb of Cleveland, Ohio. The campus is built around land that originally was two separate schools that combined in 1913. The campus has numerous buildings that carry historical significance. The campus itself has two historic districts on the National Register of Historic Places.

=== Historic buildings ===
The Baldwin–Wallace College South Campus Historic District includes a four-block area that is centered on Seminary Street. The south campus of Baldwin–Wallace College incorporates the former German Wallace College campus, which was centered on the mid-19th century site of the Lyceum Village Square. Both the college and the square are listed in the National Register of Historic Places as the Lyceum Village Square and German Wallace College Historic District in 1975. The Baldwin–Wallace College South Campus Historic District includes a total of 14 buildings and one structure.

In 2012, BW moved to propose the preservation of several historic buildings on its north part of campus. The buildings include Baldwin Memorial Library & Carnegie Science Hall (Malicky Center for Social Sciences), Wheeler Hall (Recitation Hall), Wilker Hall, Telfer Hall, Ward Hall, Burrell Observatory, the Alumni House/President's House, the Tudor House, North Hall, Findley Hall, Lang Hall and Ritter Library.

== Academic buildings ==
Image	Name	Completed	Namesake	Info	Ref.
	Wheeler Hall	1891	John Wheeler	Originally named Recitation Hall the ground-breaking ceremony was led by Mary Baldwin, John's daughter. The building holds the School of Education.	
	Marting Hall	1896	John C. Marting	Designed by Godfrey Fugman, Cramer and Fugman, renovated in 1986-89. The building is part of the BW South Campus Historic District. The building holds the History, Religion, Philosophy and English departments.	
	Malicky Center	2001	Neal Malicky	The building connects Baldwin Library and Carnegie Hall. The complex holds the University's social science programs, including political science, psychology, sociology and criminal justice.	
	Burrell Memorial Observatory	1940	Edward P. Burrell	The observatory houses a Warner & Swasey refracting telescope with a 13 3/8-inch objective, a 4-inch finder, and a 1-inch finder. Laboratories for the psychology department are located in the basement.	
	Kleist Center for Art and Drama	1972	Peter and Eleanor Kleist	Originally named the Art and Drama Center, the building was renamed in 1994. This building housed the departments of communications, studio art, theatre and dance.	
	Wilker Hall	1960's	Victor Wilker (1906 Alumnus)	Wilker was on the Board of Trustees for 35 years and was married to Mabel McKelvey. This building is home to the departments of chemistry and physics/astronomy.	
	Loomis Hall	1951	E. J. Loomis	The building was formally Loomis School. Formally part of the building was also used as the university's daycare. Today it is home the university's Communications Arts and Science College. The building is slated to be removed in the University's master plan. E. J. Loomis was an 1890 BW graduate and became the mathematics chair in 1885. The Campus Radio Station WBWC is housed here as well.	
	Kamm Hall	1960s	Jacob O. Kamm, Trustee	This building housed the School of Business.	
	Dietsch Hall	1899	Michael & Lydia Ann Dietsch	Last major renovation occurred in 1992. The building is home to the university's world language department. The building was originally built to be a women's dormitory when the Dietsch family sold their farm after a calling from God.	
	Telfer Hall	1960	Art and Helen Telfer (1931 Alumni)	Telfer is now part of the Thomas Family Center for Innovation and Growth. The building was formally called the Life and Earth Science Building. It currently houses neuroscience, biology and geology.	
	Knowlton Center	2020	Austin E. Knowlton	Knowlton Center was named in memory of Austin E. Knowlton. This building replaced Ward Hall, which formerly housed the Geology program, and was torn down. It is a new Math, Computer Science and Engineering building.	
	Thomas Center for Innovation and Growth (CIG)	2010	Jim Thomas (1959 Alumnus)	The building encompasses the complex that includes Tefler Hall, Wilker Hall, and the Center for Innovation and Growth (CIG). The CIG building is one of the only buildings to have solar panels that are used to power the building.	
	Carnegie Hall	1882	Andrew Carnegie	The building was originally called "Ladies Hall" moved using a grant from Andrew Carnegie under the stipulation the building would be used for science purposes. The building was used as a science building until the Life and Earth Sciences Building (now Telfer Hall) was built in 1960. The building was moved brick-by-brick to the corner of Front and Bagley.	
	Baldwin Library	1894	Philura Baldwin	The building was built in dedication by John Baldwin in memory of his daughter. Philura started the first collection of the university's library in Hulet hall. Today the building is part of the Malicky Center.	

=== Conservatory of Music buildings ===
The Boesel Musical Arts Center consists of several buildings on the BW campus and houses the BW Conservatory of Music. The Boesel Musical Arts Center opened in 2011. In August 2008, BW acquired the First Congregational United Church of Christ building. This building was renovated to house conservatory programs and attached to Merner-Pfeiffer Hall/Kulas Hall via a new connecting structure.

Image	Name	Completed	Namesake	Info	Ref.
	Kulas Musical Arts Building	1913	The Kulas Family	The building houses Gamble Auditorium. The building is part of the Boesel Musical Center and one of the buildings part of the Conservatory of Music.	
	First Congregational Church annex	1869	n/a	The building is part of the Boesel Musical Arts Center.	
	Boesel Musical Arts Center	2011	Stephen (1968 Alumnus) & Jacquelyn Boesel	The building connects several buildings that are considered "The Conservatory". The building is home to the musical arts program.	
	Merner-Pfeiffer Hall	1939	Mr. and Mrs. Henry Pfeiffer	The building is part of the Boesel Musical Arts Center and one of the buildings part of the Conservatory of Music. The hall was originally used as a men's dormitory.	

== Administrative and student life buildings ==
BW has several administrative buildings that also serve as locations used by students. .

Image	Name	Current Use	Completed	Namesake	Info	Ref.
	Ritter Library	Library	1958	George Ritter (alumnus)	Ritter Library is one of three libraries on campus.	
	Health Center	Health Center	1986	N/A	Built at the same time as the Lou Higgens Center	
	Lindsay-Crossman Chapel	Chapel	1870	Lindsay-Crossman (Trustee)	Originally called the Emmanuel Methodist Episcopal Church, the church was turned over to BW in the 1950s after a renovation the church was renamed.	
	Historian's House	Office	Unknown	N/A	House dedicated by the university to hold historical records and artifacts from the university.	
	Presidents House	Home	1935	N/A	The president's house went through renovations in 1982 and 2006. Between 1992 and 2006 president Neil Malicky built a home off campus so the building became the Alumni House which held offices. Currently the house is once again occupied by the president.	
	Alumni House	Offices	Unknown	N/A	The building was formally called Victoria house and used as a residence hall before coming the Alumni House in 2006.	
	Newman Center	Newman Center	Unknown	N/A	The building is used by the Newman student organization. Newman Centers are Catholic ministry centers at non-Catholic universities found throughout the world.	
	Tudor House	Campus security	Unknown	N/A	The building is used by BW Safety & Security.	
	Student Activities Center (SAC)	Student Activity Center	1913-14	N/A	Originally built to be a women's gymnasium the building has been converted into a performance hall. The building was converted to be a nonalcoholic party center and was featured in the New York Times.	
	Black Cultural Center	Cultural center	Unknown	Unknown	The building is used as meeting space for student organizations.	
	Strosacker Hall (Union)	Student Activities Center	1965	Charles Strosacker (Alumnus and professor)	The building is home to administrative offices, student organizations and a dining facility.	
	Bonds Hall	Administrative Building	Unknown	Alfred Bonds (President)	Former home of the admissions offices the building houses many student services and the president's office.	
	Durst Welcome Center	Administrative Building	2011	Richard Durst (President)	Home to the university's admissions offices.	

== Athletic and recreation buildings ==
BW has several athletic and recreation facilities used to serve in various sporting events and entertainment events. In 2008, Barack Obama spoke at the Lou Higgins Center during his presidential candidacy.

Image	Building	Completed	Namesake	Notes	Ref.
	Lou Higgins Center	1986	Mary Lou Higgins (BW Alumnus)	The building's last major renovation was 2005. The facility seats 2,800 people. The building housesphysical education department, athletics, and recreational sports and services.	
	The "Pop" Collins Tennis Complex		Arthur "Bud" Worth Collins	The tennis courts are named honor of former BW tennis coach and teacher Arthur "Bud" Worth Collins	
	Heritage Field		N/A	Located Behind Heritage Hall, Heritage Field is home to the baseball teams.	
	Tressel Field @ Finnie Stadium	1972	Tressel Family/George Finnie	In 2008, the athletic turf on George Finnie Stadium was renovated and named "Tressel Field" in honor of the Tressel Family. George Finnie was a member of the Board of Trustees until 1969. The stadium was dedicated in his name in 1972.	
	Rudolph Ursprung Gymnasium	1986	Rudolph Ursprung	Located in Lou Higgins, the courts are home to the Yellow Jackets basketball, volleyball and wrestling teams. Rudolph Ursprung, was a BW Board of Trustees member.	
	The Harrison Dillard Track	1986	Harrison Dillard	1949 BW graduate and four-time Olympic gold medalist Harrison Dillard.	
	Packard Athletic Center (formerly Bagley Hall)	2013	Former BW Coach and Professor Bob Packard	Currently houses several athletic programs, weight room facilities and athletic offices; previously a residence hall and the Cleveland Browns training facility	
	BW Natatorium	1986	N/A	Located in Lou Higgins Center is home to the Yellow Jacket swimming and diving teams	
	Roehm Athletic Complex		N/A	The softball teams play at the Roehm Athletic Complex in conjunction with the High School.	
