= George March House =

George March House may refer to:

- George March House (Chagrin Falls, Ohio), listed on the National Register of Historic Places in Cuyahoga County, Ohio
- George March House (Sandusky, Ohio), listed on the National Register of Historic Places in Erie County, Ohio
