= Baldwin-Wallace College North Campus Historic District =

Historic district in Ohio, United States

- U.S. National Register of Historic Places
- U.S. Historic district
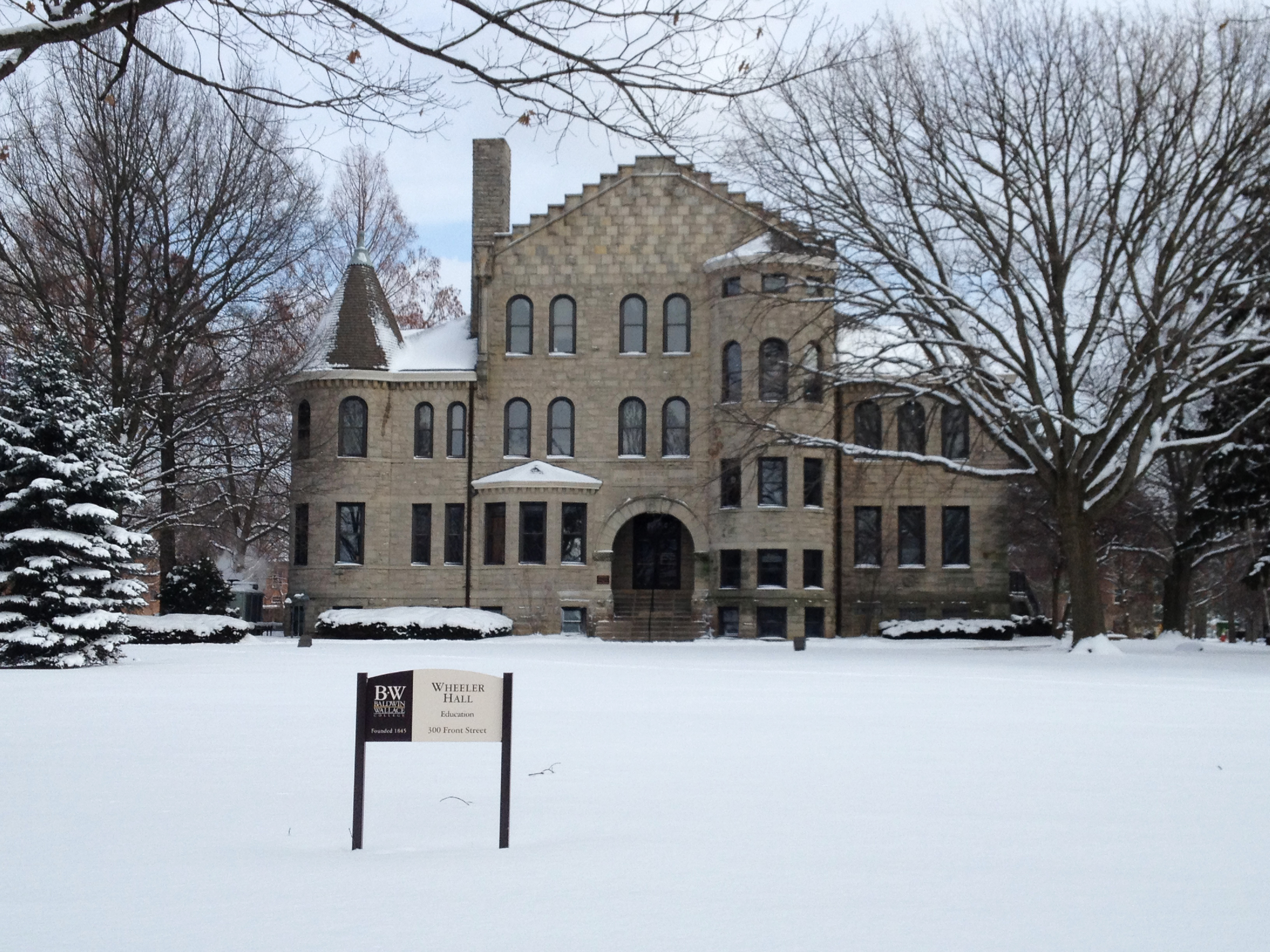
- Wheeler Hall one of several buildings in the restrict

- Location within Ohio
- Location: Berea, Ohio
- Nearest city: Berea, Ohio
- Coordinates: 41°22′28″N 81°51′05″W
- Area: Baldwin Wallace University
- NRHP reference No.: 12001210

Baldwin-Wallace College North Campus Historic District is an area of land on the north end of the Baldwin Wallace University campus. BW is a four-year private, coeducation, liberal arts college in Berea, Ohio, United States. The school was founded in 1845 as Baldwin Institute by Methodists settlers. Eventually the school merged with nearby German Wallace College in 1913 to become Baldwin-Wallace College, which changed its name to "Baldwin Wallace University" in 2012. Several buildings since its founding have been established on the National Register of Historic Places, establishing this area as the Baldwin-Wallace College North Campus Historic District. This area is the second historic district added to the campus which includes the BW's South Campus Historic district

== The district ==
The Baldwin-Wallace College North Campus Historic District is bounded by East Fifth Avenue on the north; Beech Street, east; East Bagley Road, south and Front Street, west. The Baldwin-Wallace College North Campus Historic District includes a total of 14 buildings and one structure.

The district features a variety of collegiate, religious, and residential buildings in a campus setting, mostly constructed of Berea sandstone and brick between 1866 and 1958, and representative of architectural styles from the late 19th and early 20th century including Richardsonian Romanesque, High Victorian Gothic, Georgian Colonial, Tudor Revival and mid-century Modern

== Building List ==
Image	Building	Address	Completed	Last Major Renovation	Current usage	Ref
	Philura Gould Baldwin Memorial Library (Malicky Center for Social Sciences)	33 E. Bagley Road.	1894	2001	Academic	
	Carnegie Science Hall (Malicky Center for Social Sciences)	33 E. Bagley Rd.	1882	2001	Academic	
	Wheeler Hall (Recitation Hall)	300 Front St.	1891	1990's	Academic	
	Wilker Hall	320 Front St.	1960's	2011	Academic	
	Telfer Hall (LES)	336 Front St.	1960	2011	Academic	
	Austin E. Knowlton Center	370 Front St.	2021		Academic	
	Ward Hall	36 E. Fifth Ave.	1940's	This building was demolished in 2019.	Academic	
	Burrell Memorial Observatory	42 E. Fifth Ave.	1940		Observatory	
	Alumni House/President's House	329 Beech St.	1935	1986, 2008	Residential	
	Safety and Security – Tudor House	296 Beech St.			Office	
	North Hall	309 Beech St.	1960		Residence Hall	
	Findley Hall	265 Beech St.	1957	2000	Residence Hall	
	Lang Hall	253 Beech St.	1928		Residence Hall	
	Ritter Library	57 E. Bagley Rd.	1957	2009	Library	

== History ==
=== Academic & Administrative Spaces ===
- Philura Gould Baldwin Memorial Library: The building was built in dedication by John Baldwin in memory of his daughter. Philura started the first collection of the university's library in Hulet hall. Today the building is part of the Malicy Center.
- Carnegie Science Hall: The building was originally called "Ladies Hall" moved using a grant from Andrew Carnegie under the stipulation the building would be used for science purposes. The building was used as a science building until the Life and Earth Sciences Building (now Tefler Hall) was built in 1960. The building was moved brick-by-brick to the corner of Front and Bagley.
- Wheeler Hall: Originally named Recitation Hall the ground-breaking ceremony was led by Mary Baldwin, John's daughter. The building holds the Education department. The building was originally named Recitation Hall.
- Wilker Hall: Wilker was on the board of trustees for 35 years and was married to Mabel McKelvey. Victor Wilker was a 1906 graduate. McKelvey Auditorium is located in between Wilker and Tefler Hall.
- Telfer Hall: Telfer Hall was built in 1960 and was named after Art and Helen Telfer (1931 Alumni). Telfer is now part of the Thomas Family Center for Innovation and Growth. The building was formally called the Life and Earth Science Building.
- Austin E. Knowlton Center: The building opened to students on January 19, 2021. The purpose of this building was to meet the growing STEM careers of mathematics, engineering, and computer technologies.
- Ward Hall: Ward Hall was built in the 1940s after Katherine Ward Burrell, wife of Edward P. Burrell.
- Burrell Observatory: Built in 1940, the campus observatory is named after Edward P. Burrell. Ward dedicated Burrell observatory after her husband Edward P. Burrell after his death.
- Safety and Security – Tudor House: Today the building is uses for the offices of the university's Safety and Security department.
- Ritter Library: was built in 1960 and is named after BW graduate George Ritter (1906). The space is home to the university's Library.

=== Residence Halls & Homes ===
- Alumni House/President's House: Built in 1935 the building has housed several presidents of the school. In addition, for a period of time the building served as the Alumni House (offices) when the presidents lived off campus.
- North Hall: named "North Hall" for being the farthest north residence hall on the campus .In 1846, the first building, North Hall, also known as "Old Muley", was built. Old Muley is in no relation to the present-day North Hall on the Baldwin Wallace Campus.
- Findley Hall: Built in 1957 the rec room was originally made to be a dining hall. The building also housed the Cleveland Browns Players during summer training.
- Lang Hall: Named after Emma Lang, the building was built in 1928 to be a women only dormitory. The residence hall stayed that way until 2008. The building is rumored to be haunted by Emma Land.
