= Bentleyville =

Bentleyville may refer to:

- Bentleyville, Ohio, U.S.A.
- Bentleyville, Pennsylvania, U.S.A.
