= Dr. William Gifford House =

Historic house in Ohio, United States

- U.S. National Register of Historic Places
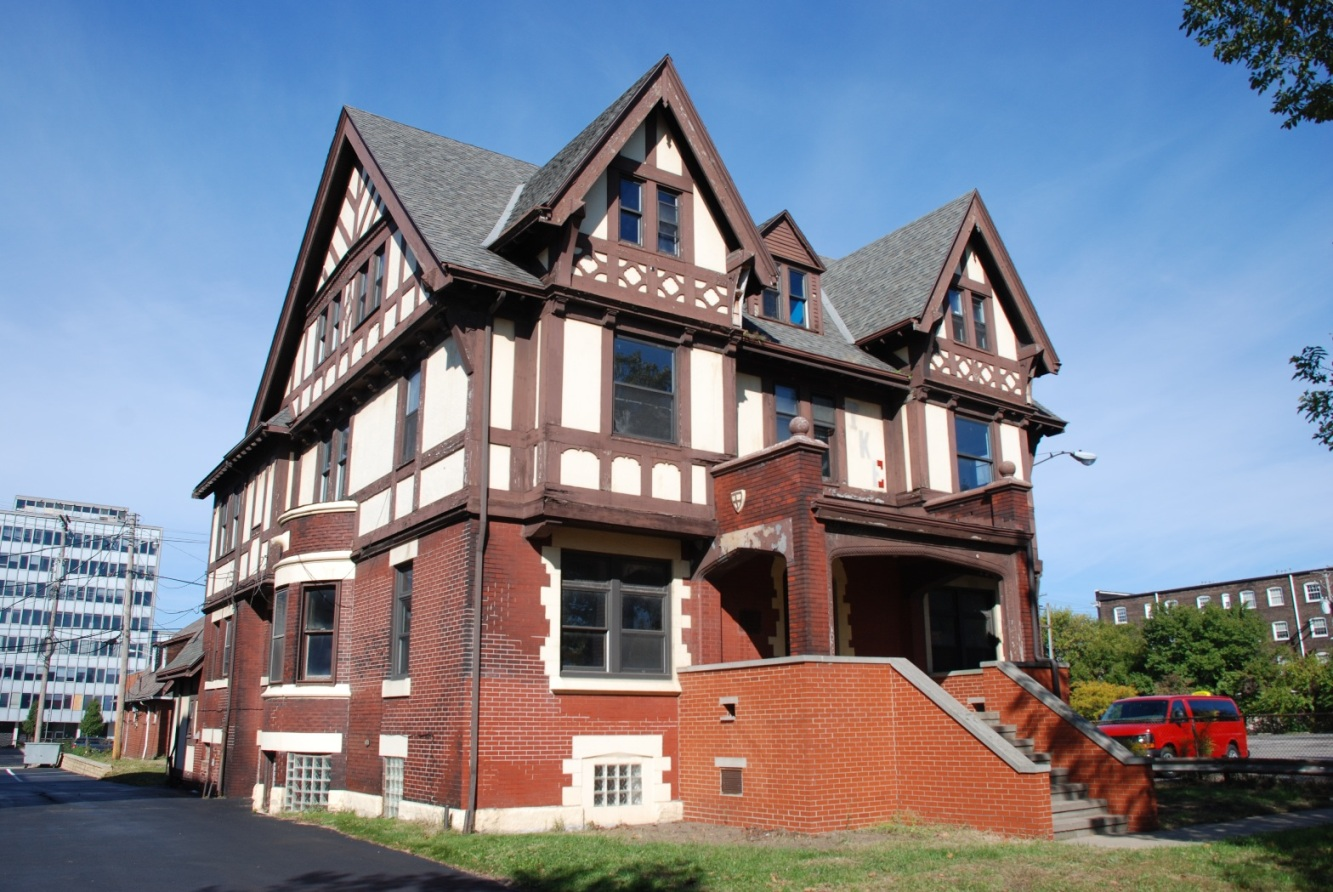
- The Gifford House in October 2010

- Location within Cleveland Location within Ohio Location within the United States
- Location: 3047 Prospect Ave., Cleveland, Ohio, United States
- Coordinates: 41°30′5″N 81°39′58″W
- Built: 1901
- Architect: W. W. Sabin
- Architectural style: Tudor Revival
- MPS: Upper Prospect MRA
- NRHP reference No.: 84000228
- Added to NRHP: November 1, 1984

The Dr. William Gifford House is a historic Tudor Revival house in Cleveland, Ohio, United States. Located east of downtown, the house sits in a neighborhood of historic houses and is a part of the Upper Prospect Multiple Resource Area. It was designed by Cleveland architect William W. Sabin and built in about 1901. The Gifford House is actually atypical of Sabin's style: working in Cleveland from 1888 to 1923, he is known better as a designer of large public buildings, especially churches (including the First Church of Christ in Euclid, also listed on the National Register) and police stations.

It was added to the National Register of Historic Places on November 1, 1984, primarily because it was a "property that embodies the distinctive characteristics of a type, period, or method of construction or represents the works of a master, or possess high artistic values, or represents a significant and distinguishable entity." The house retains its historic appearance with brick and stucco walls and the half timbers typical of the Tudor Revival style of architecture.

In the early 20th century, the building was home to the Mary E. Ingersoll Girls Friendly Club, a clubhouse operated by the Woman's Christian Temperance Union. It served as a settlement house for working young women, and offered classes on cooking and sewing, as well as providing recreational activities and boarding.

Unlike other neighborhood houses listed on the National Register, some of which are now offices, the Gifford House remains a residence. It has been owned and used as a fraternity house since 1960 by the Delta Epsilon chapter of Tau Kappa Epsilon, which includes students from the nearby Cleveland State University. In December 2011, a planned renovation of the house received an Ohio Historic Preservation Tax Credit. It will be renovated as offices for Ziska Architecture and one apartment.

== See also ==
- North American fraternity and sorority housing
