= Hotel Westlake =

Former hotel in Rocky River, Ohio

- U.S. National Register of Historic Places
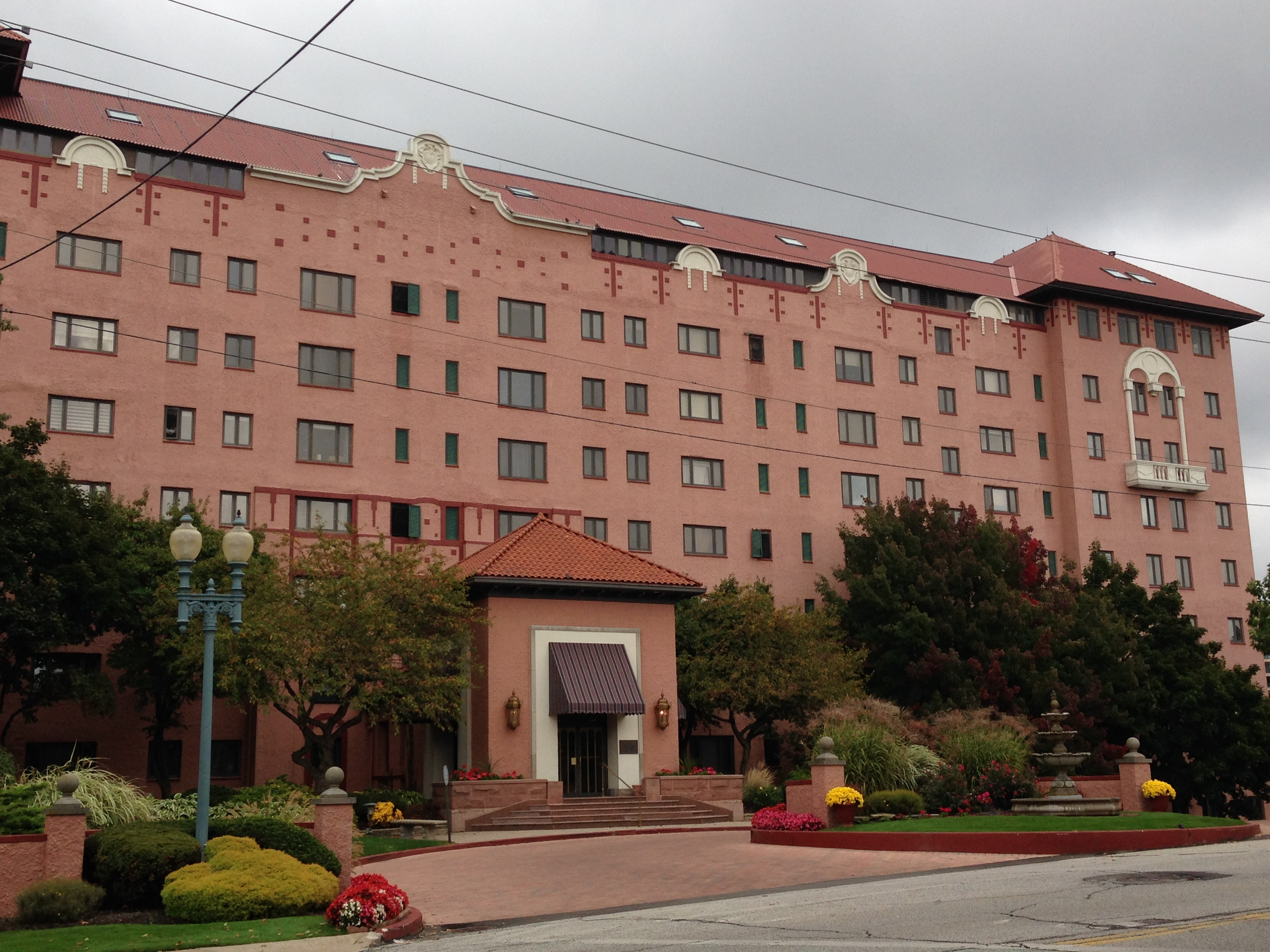
- The building as it appeared in 2014.
- Location: Rocky River, Ohio
- Coordinates: 41.483508333333°N 81.833375°W
- Built: 1925
- Architect: Harold J. MacDowell
- Architectural style: Spanish Renaissance
- NRHP reference No.: 83004278
- Added to NRHP: October 20, 1983

Hotel Westlake was a luxury hotel in Rocky River, Ohio. It was built in 1925, but converted into an apartment building in 1962, following a fire. In 1983, it was added to the National Register of Historic Places.

== Description ==
Hotel Westlake was built in 1925 at a cost of $3,500,000, equivalent to $64,255,218 in 2025. It was built in the Spanish Renaissance architecture style along the Rocky River. Locals dubbed it the "pink palace". It had 400 rooms, and a 20 ft sign on the roof that displayed the hotel's name. When it opened, it was considered one of the first suburban luxury hotels in the United States.

== History ==
Hotel Westlake was built in 1925 after a smaller hotel called the Silverthorne Inn was closed and demolished in 1918. From its opening until the end of Prohibition in 1933, Hotel Westlake was a popular location for bootleggers because of its proximity to Lake Erie. In the early days of aviation, pilots used the hotel's sign to get to Cleveland Hopkins International Airport. Notable guests included Amelia Earhart, and Charles Lindbergh.

In 1931, the conditions resulting from the Stock Market Crash of 1929 caused the owners of the hotel to place it up for auction with a starting bid of $1.05 million. However, there were no bidders, causing the hotel to go into receivership. It was finally sold in 1935 for $151,000.

In 1937, the Silverthorne Tavern Cocktail Bar was opened on the property. Local newspapers called it the only air-conditioned bar on the West side of Cleveland. In 1953, a double-deck parking garage was built to accommodate the increase in the number of guests arriving by car.

On January 25, 1962, a kitchen grease fire on a higher floor quickly spread to the roof. The fire did not spread to the lower floors because the building was fire-resistant. Nobody was injured, but the building ceased being a hotel after the incident. Nonetheless, the fire caused $500,000 in damage.

The property was turned into an apartment building later that year. However, by the 1970s, the building fell into disrepair. In 1983, a developer purchased the property and turned it into a 98-unit condominium at a cost of $13,000,000. On October 20 of that year, Hotel Westlake was added to the National Register of Historic Places.
