= William Warren Sabin =

- Born: 1861
- Died: 1939 (aged 77–78)
- Occupation: Architect
- Years active: 1888–1923

W. W. Sabin (1861–1939) was an architect in Cleveland, Ohio, United States. He practiced in the city from 1888–1923.

== Projects ==
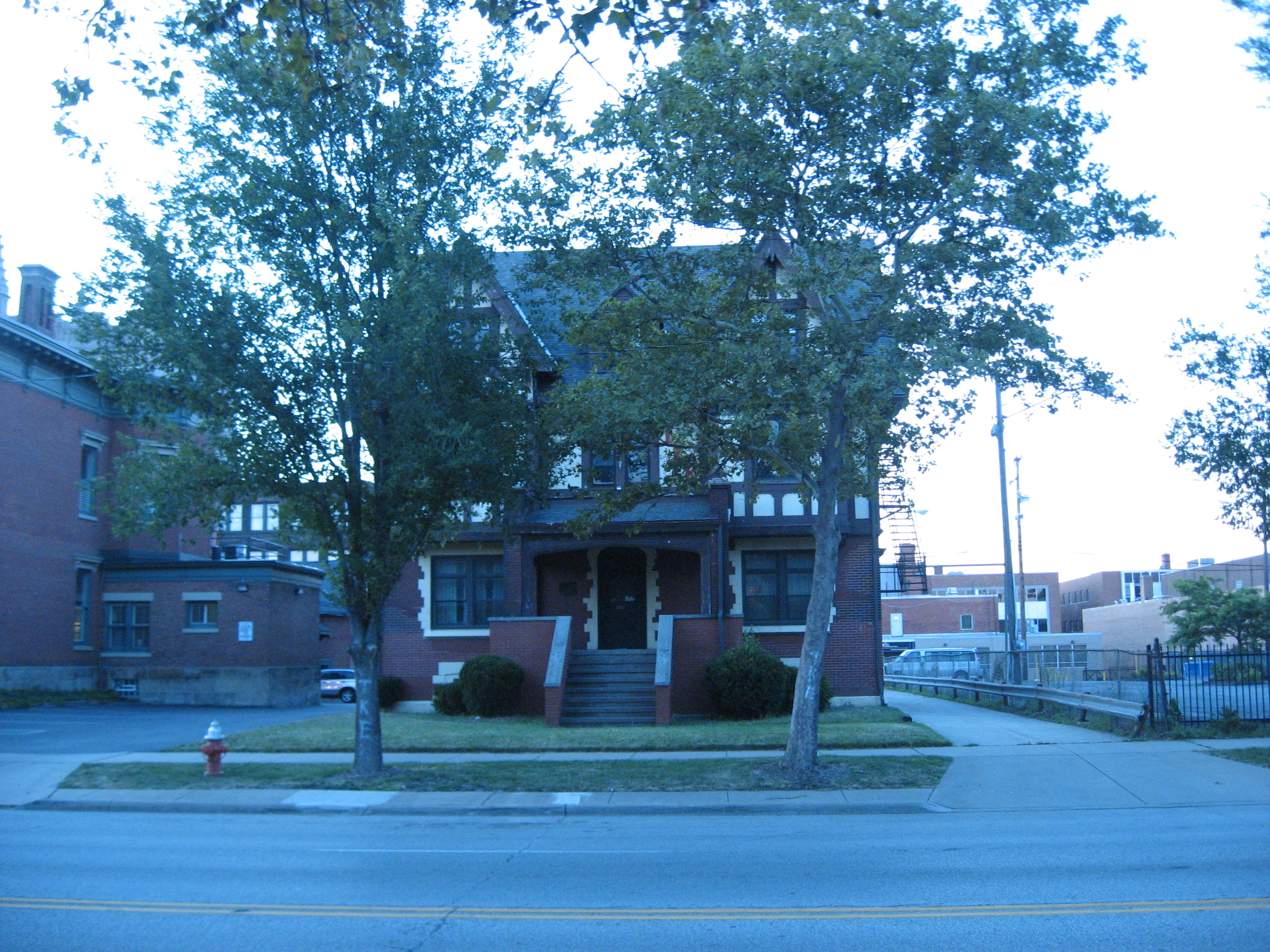
Dr. William Gifford House

- Dr. William Gifford House at 3047 Prospect Avenue in Cleveland. Listed on the National Register of Historic Places (NRHP).
- First Church of Christ in Euclid at 16200 Euclid Avenue in East Cleveland. Listed on the NRHP.
- Henry Graefe House in Sandusky at 1429 Columbus Ave in Sandusky. Listed on the NRHP 1982.
- Antioch Baptist Church (1896-1900), 8869 Cedar Avenue
- Eldred Hall at Case Western Reserve University, a 3-story English Gothic style building "faced with sandstone". The first floor is finished in oak, and the second and third floors are finished in maple and Georgia pine. It contained a cafeteria, barber shop, and auditorium. Expanded in 1938 by the architectural firm of Garfield, Harris, Robinson & Schafer.
