= Albert W. Henn Mansion =

- U.S. National Register of Historic Places
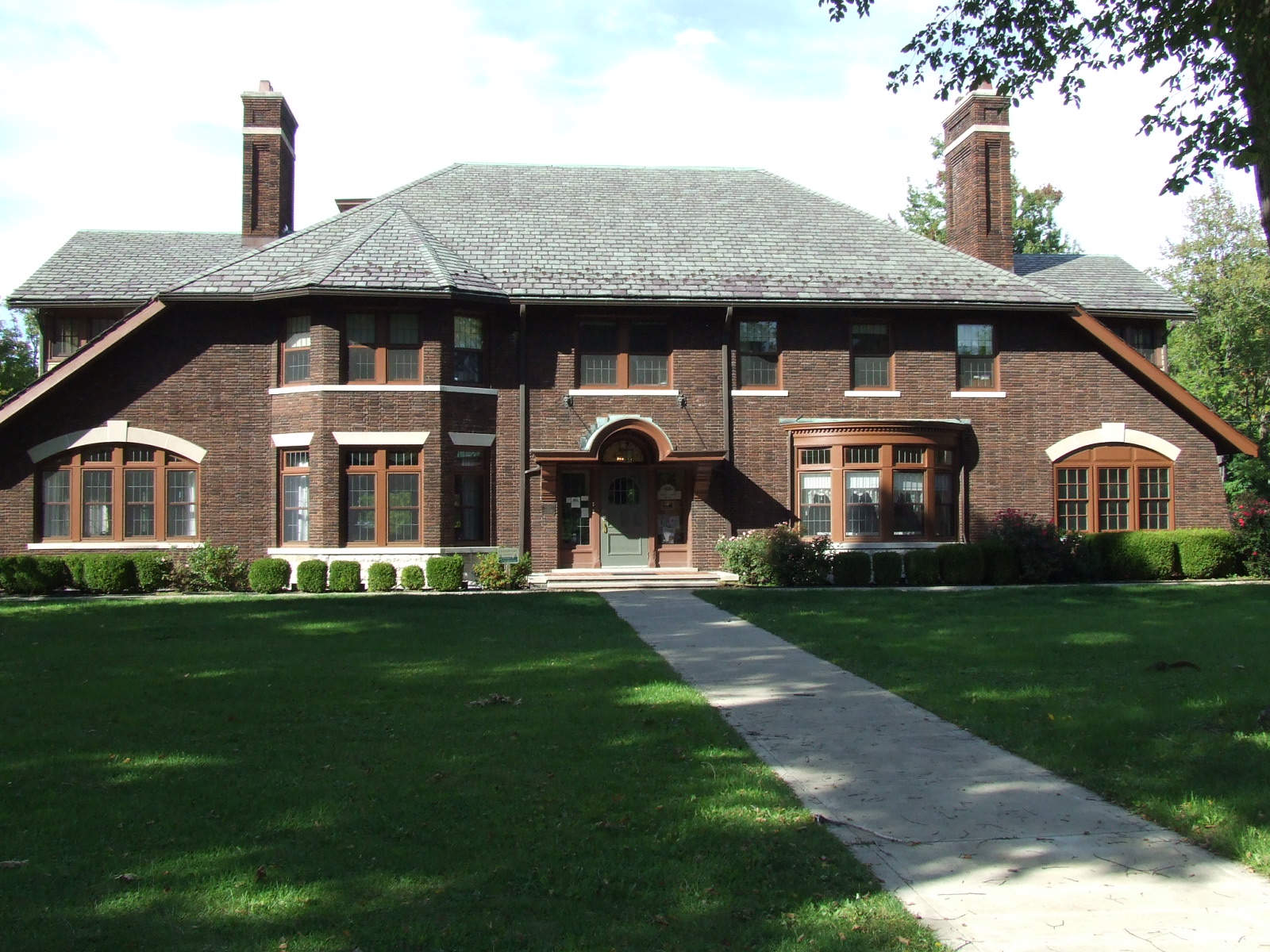
- Mansion showing front entrance

- Location within Ohio Location within the United States
- Location: 23131 Lake Shore Boulevard, Euclid, Ohio
- Coordinates: 41°36′56″N 81°31′18″W
- Built: 1923
- Architect: Earl J. Andrews
- NRHP reference No.: 00000422
- Added to NRHP: April 28, 2000

The Albert W. Henn Mansion is a residence in Euclid, Ohio on the National Register of Historic Places. Constructed in 1923 at a price tag of $150,000, it was originally the residence of Albert W. Henn, who had made a fortune in the machine tool industry.

The structure is built in the Tudor Revival style, with Bungalow and Craftsman influences. It features 23 rooms and encompasses 9200 square feet. Henn owned eight acres surrounding the house, on which he grew grapes which he sold commercially.

Henn lost his fortune during the great depression and, unable to pay his municipal taxes, he turned his house and his property over to the City of Euclid on stipulation that he be allowed to reside on the premises until his death, which occurred in 1947. The adjoining land became Sims Park, and the mansion was used as classrooms, the Euclid Board of Education's offices, and then as the location of Euclid's Recreation Department. The structure was allowed to deteriorate in the 1990s, and the city proposed to demolish it in 1996, upon which the Friends of the Henn Mansion was founded.

The Albert W. Henn Mansion was listed on the National Register of Historic Places in 2000. It is currently used as a rental place for gatherings such as parties, baby showers, weddings, and flea markets.
