= Burrell Memorial Observatory =

Observatory in Ohio, US

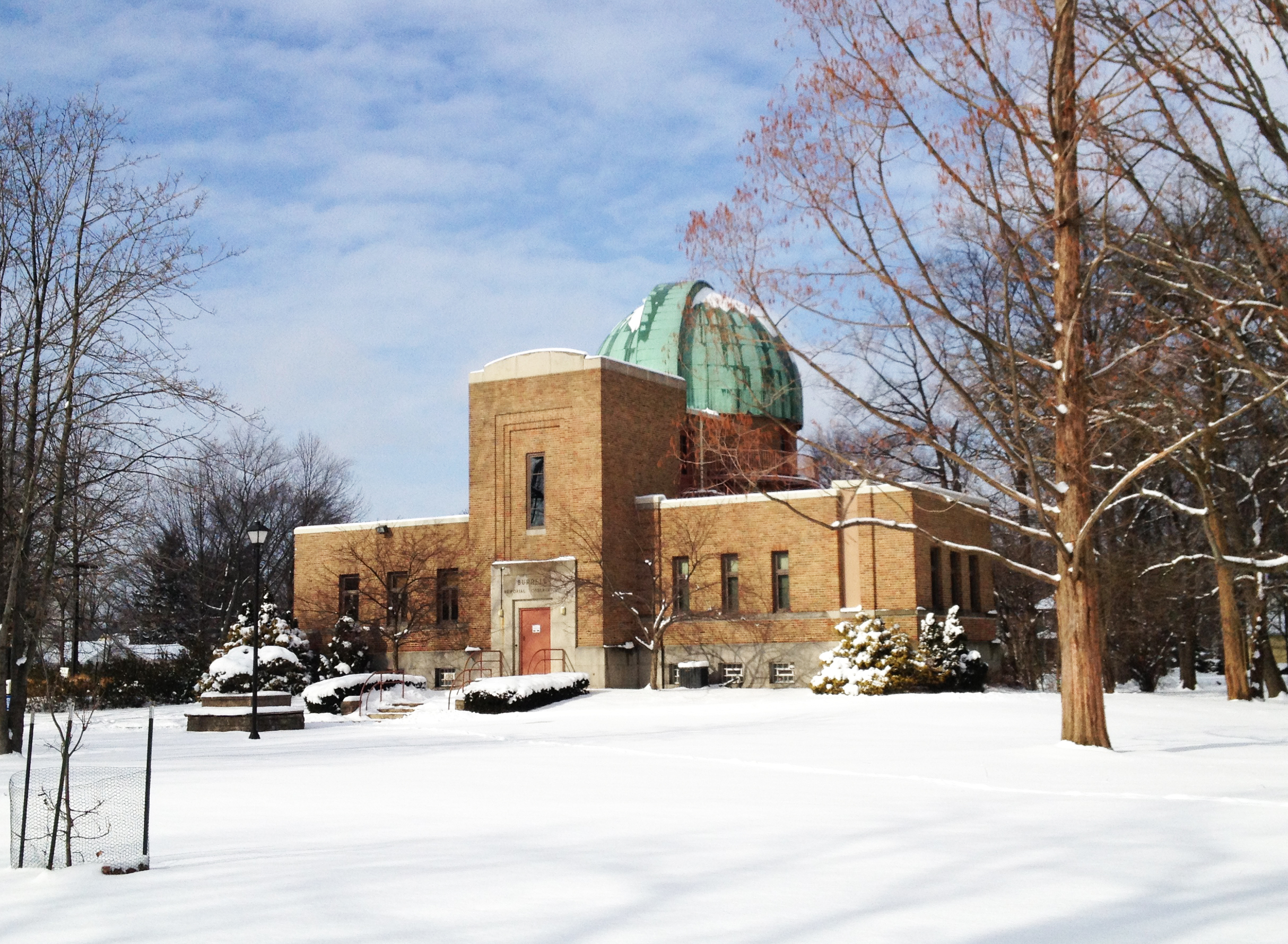
- Burrell Memorial Observatory
- Organization: Baldwin Wallace University
- Location: Berea, Ohio
- Coordinates: 41.3754°N 81.8513°W
- Established: 1940
- Website: www.bw.edu/academics/phy/ast/

Telescopes
- Warner & Swasey refracting Telescope: refracting telescope with a 13 3/8 inch objective, a 4 - inch finder, and a 1 inch finder.
- Related media on Commons

Burrell Memorial Observatory referred to as Burrell Observatory is an astronomical observatory located on the campus of Baldwin Wallace University. The observatory was established in 1940, in Berea, Ohio.

== History ==
The observatory is located on the northernmost point of the Baldwin Wallace University campus. Built in 1940, the observatory is named after Katherine Ward Burrell as a memorial to her late husband Edward P. Burrell. The observatory houses a Warner & Swasey refracting telescope with a 13 3/8-inch objective, a 4-inch finder, and a 1-inch finder.

== See also ==
- List of astronomical observatories
