= Rocky River, Ohio =

- City
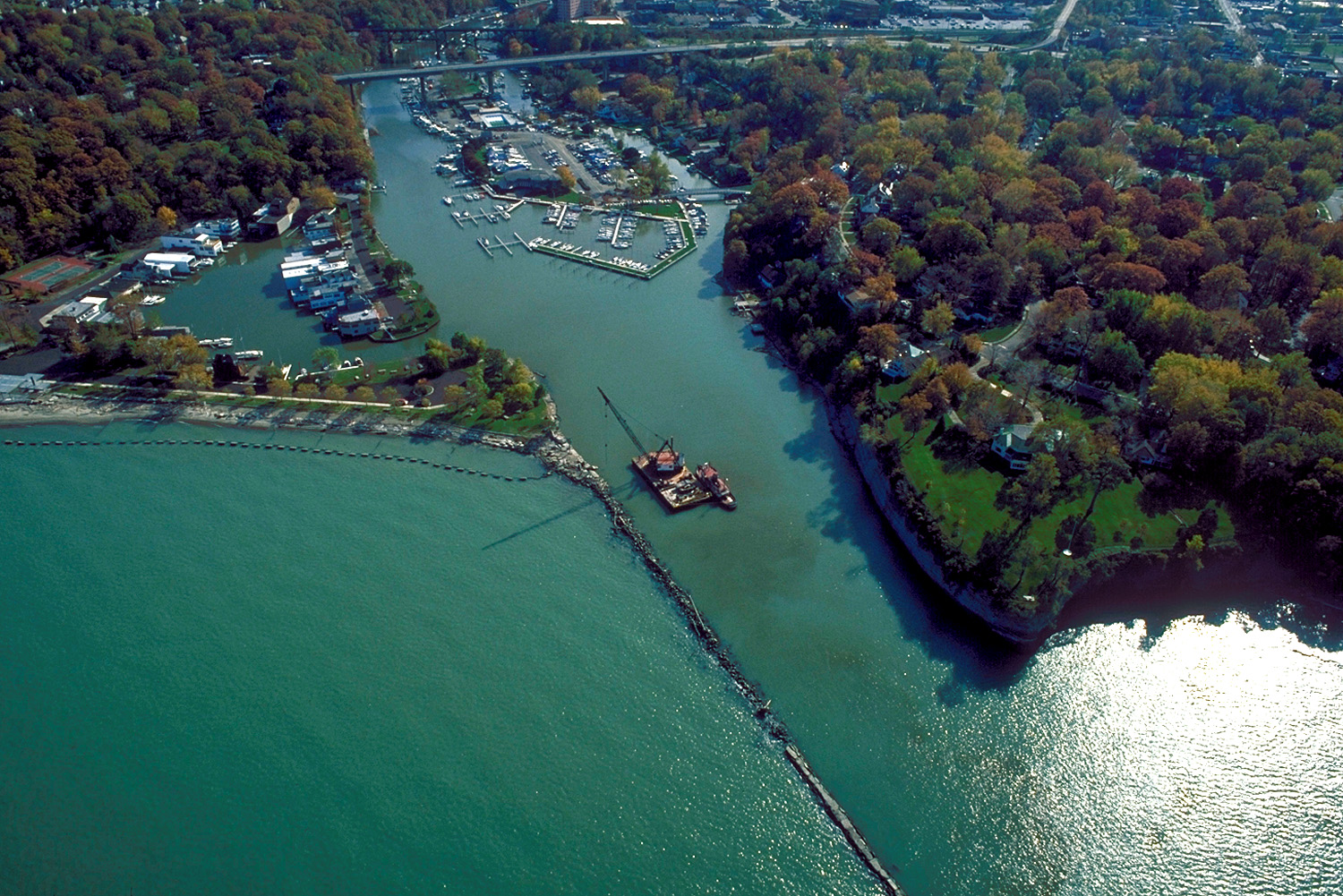
- Harbor and river entrance

- Flag Seal
- Interactive map of Rocky River, Ohio
- Location within Ohio Location within the United States
- Coordinates: 41°28′31″N 081°50′45″W
- Country: United States
- State: Ohio
- County: Cuyahoga
- Settled: 1810
- Village incorporation: 1903
- City incorporation: 1960

Government
  - Type: Mayor-council
  - Mayor: Pamela E. Bobst (R)

Area
  - Total: 5.60 sq mi (14.51 km^{2})
  - Land: 4.73 sq mi (12.25 km^{2})
  - Water: 0.87 sq mi (2.26 km^{2}) 15.51%
- Elevation: 692 ft (211 m)

Population (2020)
  - Total: 21,755
  - Density: 4,599.8/sq mi (1,775.98/km^{2})
- census
- Time zone: UTC-5 (EST)
  - Summer (DST): UTC-4 (EDT)
- ZIP code: 44116
- Area code: 440
- FIPS code: 39-68056
- GNIS feature ID: 1049132
- Website: www.rockyriverohio.gov

Rocky River is a city in western Cuyahoga County, Ohio, United States. A suburb of Cleveland, it is located along the shore of Lake Erie approximately 9 miles (14 km) west of downtown Cleveland. The city is named for the Rocky River that forms its eastern border. The population was 21,755 according to the 2020 census data results.

== Early history ==
In the summer of 1764, British Colonel John Bradstreet led a force of more than 2,000 regular soldiers, American volunteers and Native Americans as part of an attack to stop Pontiac's Rebellion, which ended before Bradstreet could attack. His mission was revised to retrieval of prisoners, exploration and peacemaking. As the host of 60 boats and nine canoes attempted to find shelter in an increasing storm on Lake Erie, waves overcame the fleet, ruining 25 boats and damaging many others. Bradstreet and his men came ashore in what is now Bradstreet's Landing Park in Rocky River on 18 October 1764. After tarrying three days, the diminished force returned to Ft. Niagara enduring significant hardship on their voyage. Rumors to the contrary, only one life was lost in the endeavor.

== Geography ==
According to the United States Census Bureau, the city has a total area of 5.61 square miles (14.53 km^{2}), of which 4.74 square miles (12.28 km^{2}) is land and 0.87 square miles (2.25 km^{2}) is water.

Most of Rocky River's eastern border follows the river bearing its name, which runs through the Rocky River Reservation of the Cleveland Metroparks system, adjacent to the city's eastern neighbor, Lakewood. A small strip of Cleveland itself also borders Rocky River; however, the two cities are not directly connected via road. Lake Erie lines the entire northern border of the city while the city of Fairview Park marks the southern border. On Rocky River's western border are the cities of Bay Village to the northwest and Westlake to the southwest.

== Demographics ==
Historical population
Census	Pop.	Note	%±
1900	1,329		—
1910	1,174		−11.7%
1920	1,861		58.5%
1930	5,632		202.6%
1940	8,291		47.2%
1950	11,237		35.5%
1960	18,907		68.3%
1970	22,958		21.4%
1980	21,084		−8.2%
1990	21,110		0.1%
2000	21,105		0.0%
2010	20,213		−4.2%
2020	21,755		7.6%

=== Racial and ethnic composition ===
Rocky River city, Ohio – Racial and ethnic composition Note: the US Census treats Hispanic/Latino as an ethnic category. This table excludes Latinos from the racial categories and assigns them to a separate category. Hispanics/Latinos may be of any race.
Race / Ethnicity (NH = Non-Hispanic)	Pop 2000	Pop 2010	Pop 2020	% 2000	% 2010	% 2020
White alone (NH)	19,891	19,040	19,546	95.93%	94.20%	89.85%
Black or African American alone (NH)	80	196	278	0.39%	0.97%	1.28%
Native American or Alaska Native alone (NH)	11	14	18	0.05%	0.07%	0.08%
Asian alone (NH)	273	357	511	1.32%	1.77%	2.35%
Native Hawaiian or Pacific Islander alone (NH)	4	5	8	0.02%	0.02%	0.04%
Other race alone (NH)	19	7	76	0.09%	0.03%	0.35%
Mixed race or Multiracial (NH)	209	227	612	1.01%	1.12%	2.81%
Hispanic or Latino (any race)	248	367	706	1.20%	1.82%	3.25%
Total	20,735	20,213	21,755	100.00%	100.00%	100.00%

=== 2020 census ===
As of the 2020 census, Rocky River had a population of 21,755. The median age was 45.4 years. 20.2% of residents were under the age of 18 and 23.7% of residents were 65 years of age or older. For every 100 females there were 87.1 males, and for every 100 females age 18 and over there were 83.8 males age 18 and over.

100.0% of residents lived in urban areas, while 0.0% lived in rural areas.

There were 9,907 households in Rocky River, of which 24.6% had children under the age of 18 living in them. Of all households, 45.4% were married-couple households, 17.9% were households with a male householder and no spouse or partner present, and 32.2% were households with a female householder and no spouse or partner present. About 38.8% of all households were made up of individuals and 19.5% had someone living alone who was 65 years of age or older.

There were 10,604 housing units, of which 6.6% were vacant. The homeowner vacancy rate was 1.0% and the rental vacancy rate was 9.6%.

Racial composition as of the 2020 census
Race	Number	Percent
White	19,733	90.7%
Black or African American	300	1.4%
American Indian and Alaska Native	21	0.1%
Asian	514	2.4%
Native Hawaiian and Other Pacific Islander	9	0.0%
Some other race	193	0.9%
Two or more races	985	4.5%
Hispanic or Latino (of any race)	706	3.2%

=== 2010 census ===
As of the 2010 United States census, there were 20,213 people, 9,283 households, and 5,242 families residing in the city. The population density was 4,264.3 inhabitants per square mile (1,646.5/km^{2}). There were 10,181 housing units at an average density of 2,147.9 per square mile (829.3/km^{2}). The racial makeup of the city was 95.5% White, 1.0% African American, 0.1% Native American, 1.8% Asian, 0.4% from other races, and 1.3% from two or more races. Hispanic or Latino of any race were 1.8% of the population.

There were 9,283 households, of which 25.1% had children under the age of 18 living with them, 45.9% were married couples living together, 7.7% had a female householder with no husband present, 2.8% had a male householder with no wife present, and 43.5% were non-families. 39.5% of all households were made up of individuals, and 19.3% had someone living alone who was 65 years of age or older. The average household size was 2.16 and the average family size was 2.95.

The median age in the city was 45.6 years. 21.8% of residents were under the age of 18; 4.8% were between the ages of 18 and 24; 22.5% were from 25 to 44; 28.5% were from 45 to 64; and 22.4% were 65 years of age or older. The gender makeup of the city was 46.1% male and 53.9% female.

Of the city's population over the age of 25, 54.8% hold a bachelor's degree or higher.

91.8% spoke English, 1.9% Spanish, 1.4% Arabic, 1.2% Hungarian, 1.0% German, and 0.8% Greek.

=== 2000 census ===
As of the 2000 United States census, there were 20,735 people, 9,709 households, and 5,437 families residing in the city. The population density was 4,360.8 inhabitants per square mile (1,683.7/km^{2}). There were 10,166 housing units at an average density of 2,138.0 per square mile (825.5/km^{2}). The racial makeup of the city was 96.83% White, 0.41% African American, 0.07% Native American, 1.33% Asian, 0.02% Pacific Islander, 0.27% from other races, and 1.08% from two or more races. Hispanic or Latino of any race were 1.20% of the population.

There were 9,709 households, out of which 22.5% had children under the age of 18 living with them, 47.2% were married couples living together, 6.9% had a female householder with no husband present, and 44.0% were non-families. 40.3% of all households were made up of individuals, and 20.5% had someone living alone who was 65 years of age or older. The average household size was 2.11 and the average family size was 2.90.

In the city the population was spread out, with 20.9% under the age of 18, 4.3% from 18 to 24, 25.9% from 25 to 44, 24.6% from 45 to 64, and 24.2% who were 65 years of age or older. The median age was 44 years. For every 100 females, there were 82.0 males. For every 100 females age 18 and over, there were 77.4 males.

The median income for a household in the city was $71,636, and the median income for a family was $94,361. Males had a median income of $62,727 versus $32,145 for females. The per capita income for the city was $34,663. About 1.5% of families and 2.3% of the population were below the poverty line, including 1.3% of those under age 18 and 3.8% of those age 65 or over.

== Government ==
Rocky River is in Ohio's 7th congressional district, represented by Republican Representative Max Miller, a resident of Rocky River.

== Notable people ==
(B) denotes that the person was born there.

- Kevin Barnes, front man and songwriter for the indie rock band of Montreal.(B)
- Nina Blackwood, the first of the original five MTV VJs, graduated from Rocky River High School in 1970.
- Clint Brown, pitcher for the Cleveland Indians and the Chicago White Sox, was a resident when he died in 1955.
- Carter Camper, ice hockey player who made his NHL debut with the Boston Bruins.
- G. William Domhoff, professor of sociology and psychology at UC Santa Cruz; attended Rocky River High School.
- Red Gerard Professional Olympic Snowboarder
- Anthony Gonzalez, former NFL wide receiver, served as a U.S. congressman representing Ohio's 16th congressional district from 2019 to 2023
- Chris Hovan, professional American football player for the St. Louis Rams(B)
- Sammy Kaye, Big Band Era bandleader and songwriter, graduated from Rocky River High School in 1928.
- Pat McCormick, comic actor and writer, grew up in Rocky River, and attended Rocky River High School.
- Norm Michael, college football player, born in Rocky River.(B)
- Max Miller, congressman from Ohio's 7th congressional district since 2023.
- Milton C. Portmann, professional American football player. Decorated WWI US Army Officer. Resident when he died in 1967.
- Martin Savidge, award-winning American television news correspondent for NBC News and CNN, graduated from Rocky River High School in 1976.
- Michael Stanley, rock musician, graduated from Rocky River High School in 1966.
- George Steinbrenner, businessman and one-time owner of the New York Yankees.(B)
- Brian K. Vaughan, comic book and television writer.
