= Bentleyville, Ohio =

- Village
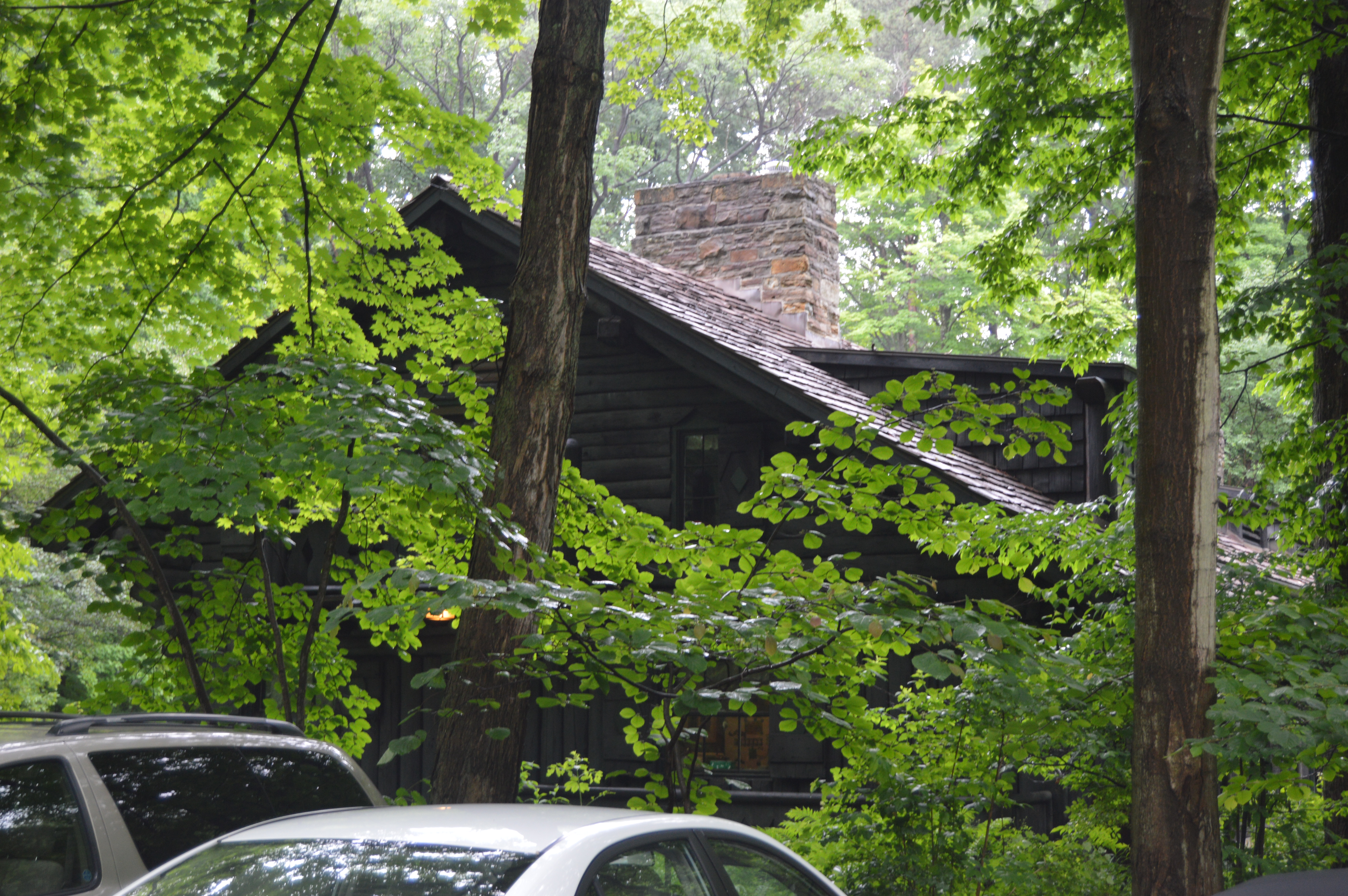
- Look About Lodge, South Chagrin Reservation
- Motto: "Serve, Preserve, Conserve"
- Interactive map of Bentleyville, Ohio
- Location within Ohio Location within the United States
- Coordinates: 41°24′49″N 81°24′47″W
- Country: United States
- State: Ohio
- County: Cuyahoga

Government
  - Mayor: Kathleen M. Hale (D)

Area
  - Total: 2.59 sq mi (6.70 km^{2})
  - Land: 2.54 sq mi (6.59 km^{2})
  - Water: 0.042 sq mi (0.11 km^{2})
- Elevation: 935 ft (285 m)

Population (2020)
  - Total: 897
  - Estimate (2023): 884
  - Density: 352/sq mi (136.1/km^{2})
- Time zone: UTC-5 (Eastern (EST))
  - Summer (DST): UTC-4 (EDT)
- ZIP code: 44022
- Area code: 440
- FIPS code: 39-05550
- GNIS feature ID: 1037862
- Website: villageofbentleyville.com

Bentleyville is a village in Cuyahoga County, Ohio, United States. The population was 897 at the 2020 census. A suburb of Cleveland, it is a part of the Cleveland metropolitan area.

== History ==
Bentleyville was laid out in 1831 by Adamson Bentley, and named for him.

== Geography ==
Bentleyville is located at 41°24′49″N 81°24′47″W (41.413520, -81.412996).

According to the United States Census Bureau, the village has a total area of 2.60 square miles (6.73 km^{2}), of which 2.56 square miles (6.63 km^{2}) is land and 0.04 square miles (0.10 km^{2}) is water.

== Demographics ==
Historical population
| Census | Pop. | Note | %± |
|---|---|---|---|
| 1930 | 83 | | — |
| 1940 | 117 | | 41.0% |
| 1950 | 152 | | 29.9% |
| 1960 | 301 | | 98.0% |
| 1970 | 338 | | 12.3% |
| 1980 | 381 | | 12.7% |
| 1990 | 674 | | 76.9% |
| 2000 | 947 | | 40.5% |
| 2010 | 864 | | −8.8% |
| 2020 | 897 | | 3.8% |
| 2023 (est.) | 884 | ▼ | −1.4% |
U.S. Decennial Census

=== 2020 census ===
Bentleyville village, Ohio – Racial and ethnic composition Note: the US Census treats Hispanic/Latino as an ethnic category. This table excludes Latinos from the racial categories and assigns them to a separate category. Hispanics/Latinos may be of any race.
| Race / Ethnicity (NH = Non-Hispanic) | Pop 2000 | Pop 2010 | Pop 2020 | % 2000 | % 2010 | % 2020 |
|---|---|---|---|---|---|---|
| White alone (NH) | 911 | 816 | 810 | 96.20% | 94.44% | 90.30% |
| Black or African American alone (NH) | 8 | 6 | 7 | 0.84% | 0.69% | 0.78% |
| Native American or Alaska Native alone (NH) | 0 | 0 | 0 | 0.00% | 0.00% | 0.00% |
| Asian alone (NH) | 17 | 24 | 21 | 1.80% | 2.78% | 2.34% |
| Native Hawaiian or Pacific Islander alone (NH) | 0 | 0 | 0 | 0.00% | 0.00% | 0.00% |
| Other race alone (NH) | 0 | 0 | 2 | 0.00% | 0.00% | 0.22% |
| Mixed race or Multiracial (NH) | 2 | 13 | 28 | 0.21% | 1.50% | 3.12% |
| Hispanic or Latino (any race) | 9 | 5 | 29 | 0.95% | 0.58% | 3.23% |
| Total | 947 | 864 | 897 | 100.00% | 100.00% | 100.00% |

=== 2010 census ===
As of the census of 2010, there were 864 people, 303 households, and 261 families living in the village. The population density was 337.5 inhabitants per square mile (130.3/km^{2}). There were 318 housing units at an average density of 124.2 per square mile (48.0/km^{2}). The racial makeup of the village was 95.0% White, 0.7% African American, 2.8% Asian, and 1.5% from two or more races. Hispanic or Latino of any race were 0.6% of the population.

There were 303 households, of which 44.6% had children under the age of 18 living with them, 81.2% were married couples living together, 3.3% had a female householder with no husband present, 1.7% had a male householder with no wife present, and 13.9% were non-families. 13.2% of all households were made up of individuals, and 4.6% had someone living alone who was 65 years of age or older. The average household size was 2.85 and the average family size was 3.14.

The median age in the village was 46.2 years. 29.3% of residents were under the age of 18; 5.2% were between the ages of 18 and 24; 13.2% were from 25 to 44; 42.3% were from 45 to 64; and 10.1% were 65 years of age or older. The gender makeup of the village was 49.5% male and 50.5% female.

=== 2000 census ===
As of the census of 2000, there were 947 people, 297 households, and 263 families living in the village. The population density was 363.3 inhabitants per square mile (140.3/km^{2}). There were 306 housing units at an average density of 117.4 per square mile (45.3/km^{2}). The racial makeup of the village was 97.15% White, 0.84% African American, 1.80% Asian, and 0.21% from two or more races. Hispanic or Latino of any race were 0.95% of the population.

There were 297 households, out of which 52.9% had children under the age of 18 living with them, 85.9% were married couples living together, 2.4% had a female householder with no husband present, and 11.4% were non-families. 8.8% of all households were made up of individuals, and 2.4% had someone living alone who was 65 years of age or older. The average household size was 3.19 and the average family size was 3.43.

In the village, the population was spread out, with 36.4% under the age of 18, 3.2% from 18 to 24, 21.5% from 25 to 44, 32.7% from 45 to 64, and 6.1% who were 65 years of age or older. The median age was 41 years. For every 100 females there were 103.7 males. For every 100 females age 18 and over, there were 99.3 males.

The median income for a household in the village was $160,902, and the median income for a family was $183,243. Males had a median income of $100,000 versus $55,313 for females. The per capita income for the village was $72,392. None of the families and 1.0% of the population were living below the poverty line, including no under eighteens and 1.7% of those over 64.

== Government ==
The current mayor of Bentleyville is Kathleen M. Hale. She has been in office since January 2024. There are currently six members on village council. The mayor and council members are elected every four years.

== Education ==
Bentleyville is served by the Chagrin Falls Exempted Village School District.
