= Rocky River (Ohio) =

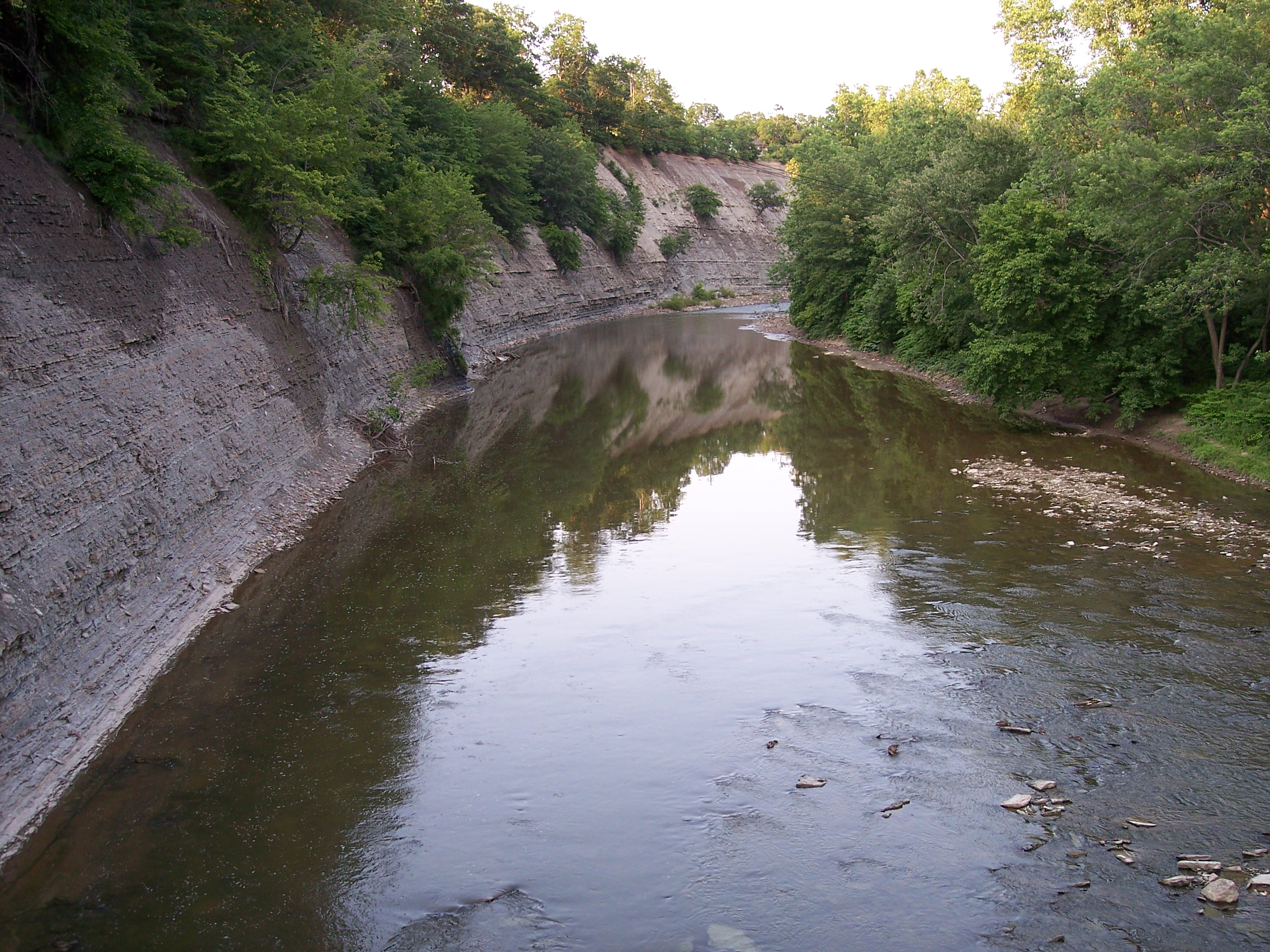
- A shale cliff along the Rocky River in the Cleveland Metroparks Rocky River Reservation, located on the boundary of the cities of Lakewood and Rocky River, Ohio.

Location
- Country: United States

Physical characteristics
- Source
  - location: Confluence of East Branch Rocky River and West Branch Rocky River, between Cleveland and North Olmsted, Cuyahoga County, Ohio
  - coordinates: 41°24′23″N 81°53′14″W
  - elevation: 657 feet (200 m) AMSL
- Mouth
  - location: Lake Erie between Lakewood and Rocky River, Cuyahoga County, Ohio
  - coordinates: 41°29′28″N 81°50′21″W
  - elevation: 571 feet (174 m) AMSL

Basin features
- GNIS ID: 1066928

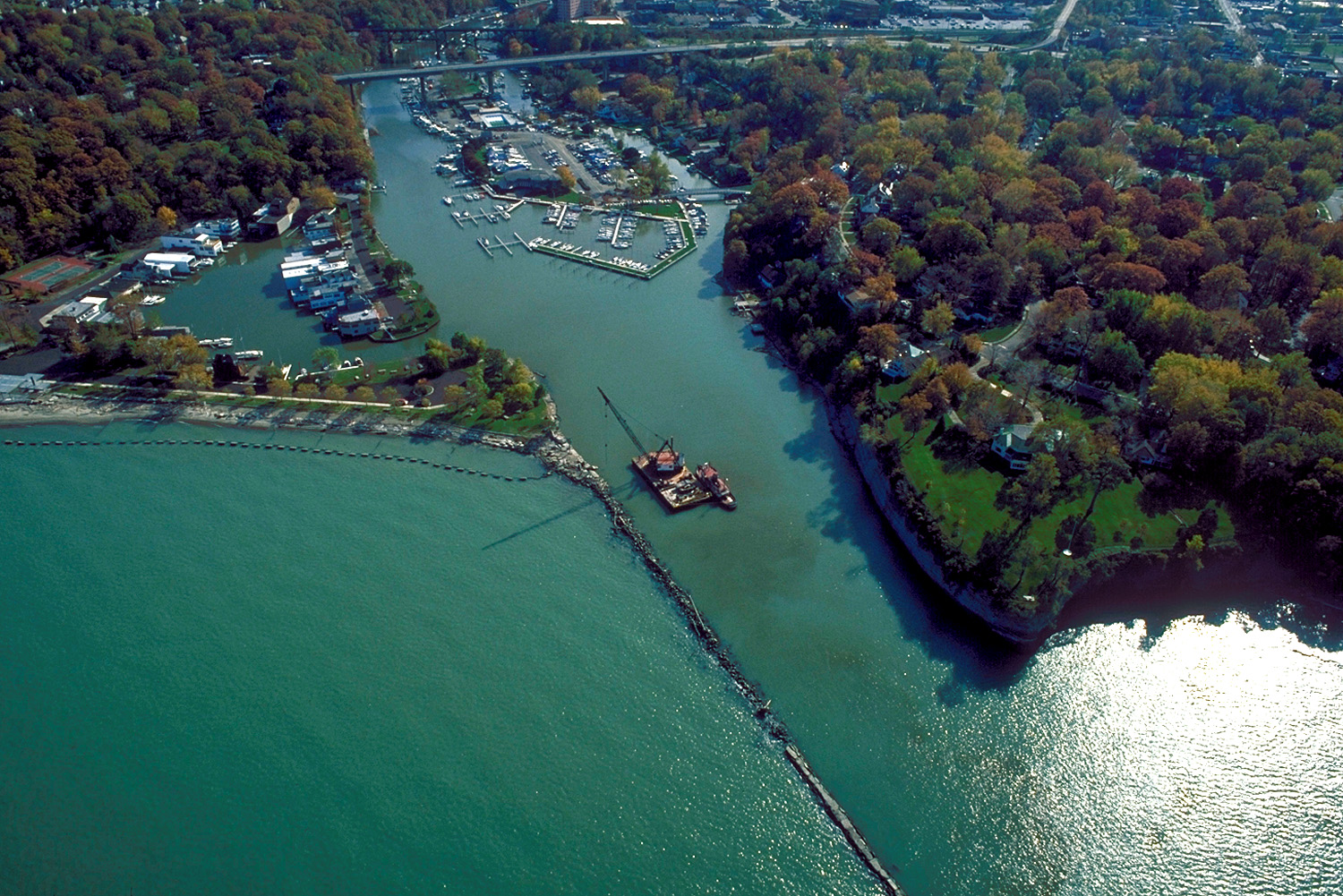
Aerial view, looking southerly, of the river's mouth and surrounding area of discharge into Lake Erie, in Rocky River. At top, the Clifton Park-West Lake Bridge carries U.S. Route 6 across the river. At center is a derrick boat operated by the U.S. Army Corps of Engineers, which dredges the navigation channel and maintains the breakwater.

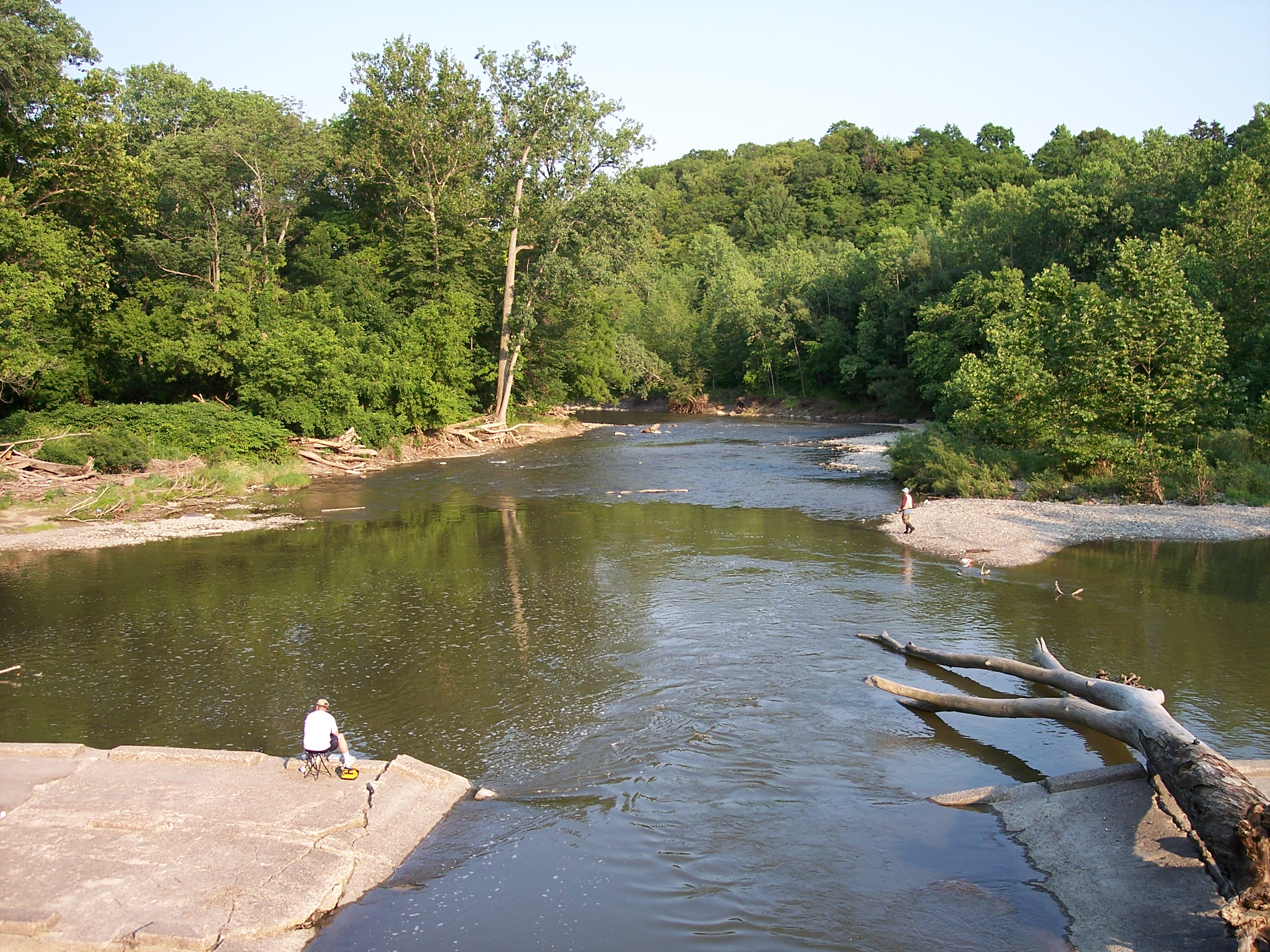
A bend in the Rocky River and adjoining riverbanks are seen in this photo taken from a bridge on the Cleveland-Rocky River border in the Rocky River Reservation.

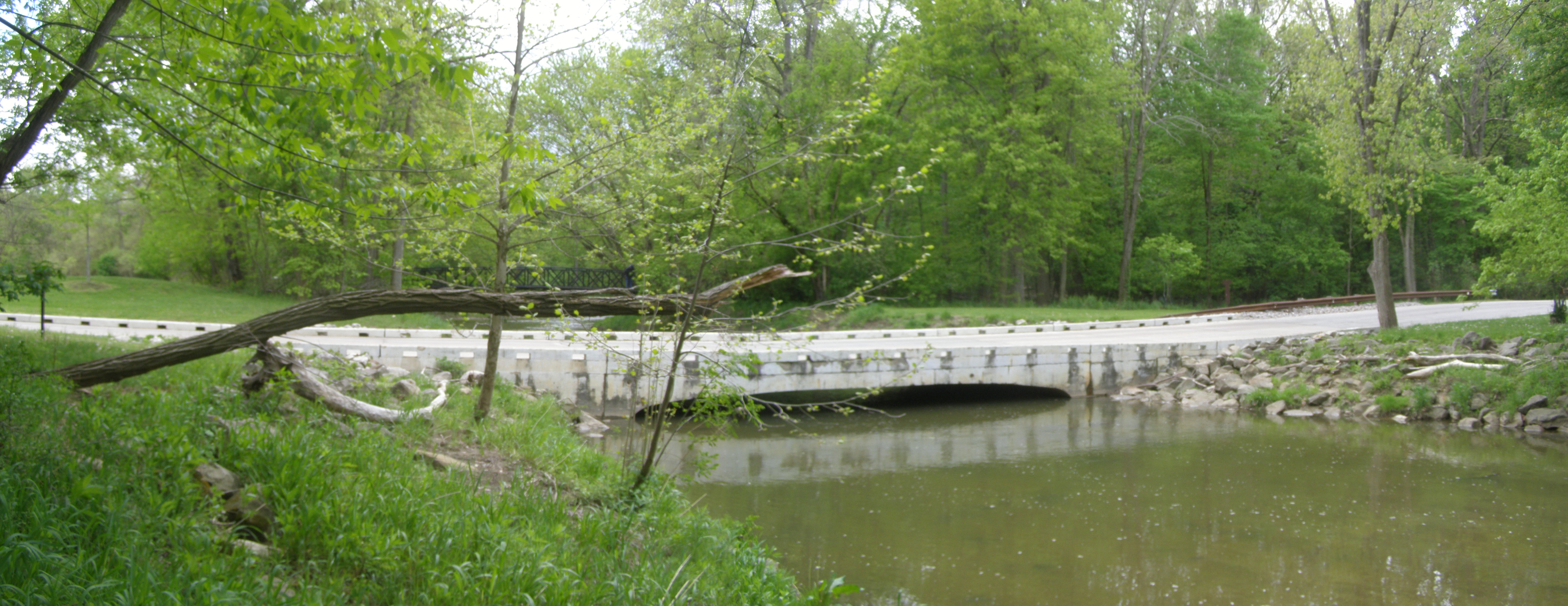
Low water ford bridge over the East Branch Rocky River in the Millstream Reservation.

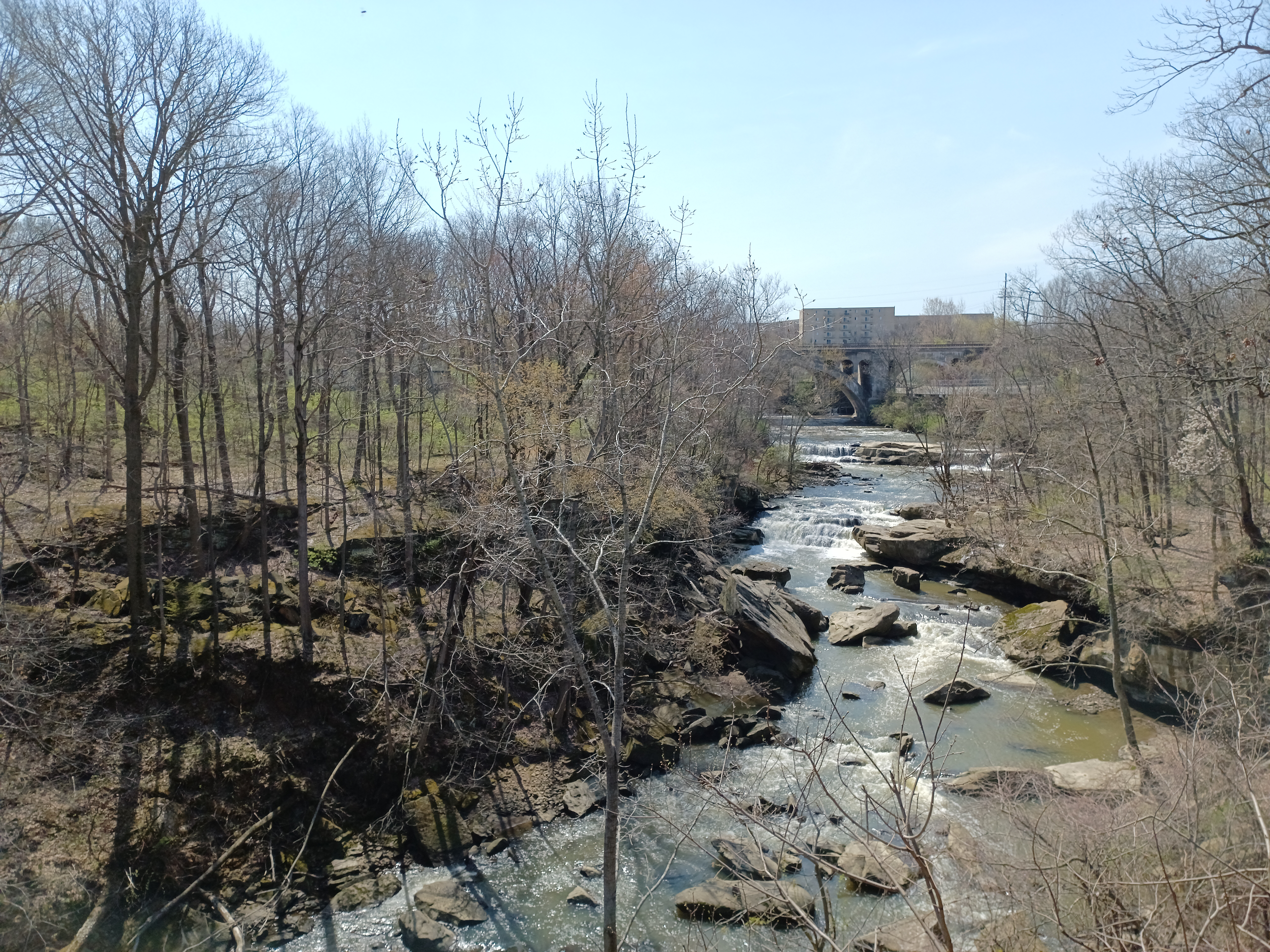
Berea Falls on the East Branch Rocky River in Berea, Ohio

The Rocky River is a 12-mile (19 km) long tributary of Lake Erie located in Cuyahoga County, Ohio. The river originates at the confluence of its East and West Branches in the city of North Olmsted. The East Branch Rocky River extends 35 miles (56 km) from its headwaters in Broadview Heights, located in Cuyahoga County. The West Branch Rocky River is 36 miles (58 km) long and begins in Montville Township in Medina County. A North Branch also exists, originating in Granger Township in Medina County and joining the West Branch in the city of Medina.

The river forms the natural western boundaries of Cleveland and the suburb of Lakewood with the suburbs of Fairview Park and Rocky River. The latter community is named after the river. To the south of Fairview Park and west of Cleveland Hopkins International Airport, the river forms the natural boundary between the suburb of Brook Park and the communities of North Olmsted and Olmsted Township. Ranked by Field & Stream as one of the top steelhead trout rivers in the world, the Rocky River is the center of the Rocky River Reservation of the Cleveland Metroparks.

== Watershed and Course ==
Rocky River's watershed encompasses approximately 294 square miles (760 km^{2}) in Northeast Ohio, covering portions of Cuyahoga, Lorain, Medina, and Summit counties. It includes the main stem of the Rocky River as well as its East, West, and North Branches.

The main branch is notable for its deep valley and steep shale cliffs, which in some areas descend up to 150 feet (46 m) below street level. This section of the river is crossed by eight high-level bridges and features a diverse landscape that includes open meadows and dense floodplain forests. Common tree species in the area include cottonwoods, sycamores, and willows.

Most of its main stem lies within the Rocky River Reservation, part of the Cleveland Metroparks system. This 2,572-acre (1,041 ha) reservation is publicly accessible and includes the first parcel of land acquired by William A. Stinchcomb, the founder of the Cleveland Metroparks, for the creation of the park district.

The river itself is formed by the confluence of the East and West Branches in North Olmsted at Cedar Point Hill (unrelated to the theme park of the same name north of Sandusky), just west of Cleveland Hopkins International Airport.

Its West Branch headwaters are predominantly located in Medina County, where the north and south branches merge to form the west branch and flow northward through, among other locales, the town of Olmsted Falls. The East Branch first begins in the Cleveland suburb of North Royalton, near State Rd. and Wallings Rd. The flow here is actually to the south, through Richfield and Hinckley Townships. The East Branch wraps around Whipp's Ledges in Hinckley Township and begins its north-northwest journey. Hinckley Lake is actually the East Branch Rocky, impounded in the late 1920s/early 1930s. On its course back through southwestern Cuyahoga County, the East Branch is an important local feature in the cities of Strongsville and Berea.

Lower portions of both branches and the mainstem Rocky River flow through a V-shaped valley; the valley and the river are part of the Cleveland Metroparks system. The Rocky River valley is heavily forested, and a parkway along the river provides access to many different activities available in the park. Given the heavy population density of Cleveland and its older suburbs, many of which border the valley, the valley provides a popular location for recreational activities that would be difficult in other parts of the city.

=== Pollution ===
The Rocky River is largely free from industrial pollution. This is because most of its sources are in agricultural and suburban areas, which results in natural organic pollution and sewage, resulting in higher bacteria levels than rivers downstream from industrial discharges.

=== Crossings and tributaries ===
The Rocky River valley is quite deep from the confluence of the East and West Branches at Cedar Point downstream to Lake Erie, at times approaching 150 feet (45.7 m) below the ground level on either side of the valley. This depth has required several high-level and low-level bridges to cross the valley between Lakewood and Rocky River and between Cleveland and Fairview Park.

Several of the low-level bridges which cross the river within the valley are subject to closure and flooding during and after heavy storms, but these low-level bridges are mostly used by local traffic on the Valley Parkway which follows the Rocky River's course, and cross it several times.

From the north (mouth) upstream to south (source):

Crossings and tributaries of the Rocky River (Lake Erie)
ID	Name	GNIS	Coordinates	Elevation	Year Built	Length	Carries
	West Channel Rocky River	1072305	41°29′11″N 81°50′7″W	581 feet (177 m)			
1800639	Clifton Park-West Lake				1964	1,139 feet (347.2 m)	U.S. Route 6, Ohio State Route 2, Ohio State Route 254
	Nickel Plate Road						Norfolk Southern Railway
1801074	Detroit Avenue	1073890	41°28′57″N 81°49′52″W	568 feet (173 m)	1980	640 feet (195.1 m)	U.S. Route 6A, U.S. Route 20, Ohio State Route 113
							Valley Parkway
1808567					1971	839 feet (255.7 m)	I-90
1830147	Hilliard Avenue				1925	860 feet (262.1 m)	former U.S. Route 20, Cuyahoga County Route 69
							old Valley Parkway ford
							Valley Parkway
							Valley Parkway
1801325	Lorain Road				1935	1,230 feet (374.9 m)	Ohio State Route 10
	Old Lorain Road						
1831623	Puritas Road				1977	195 feet (59.4 m)	Cuyahoga County Route 189
1812831					1970	1,571 feet (478.8 m)	I-480
1802046	Brookpark Road				1933	1,919 feet (584.9 m)	Ohio State Route 17
	Abram Creek	1037303	41°25′4″N 81°51′59″W	640 feet (200 m)			
							Valley Parkway
1830643	Cedar Point Road				1929	62 feet (18.9 m)	Cuyahoga County Route 193
	West Branch Rocky River	1067044	41°24′23″N 81°53′13″W	659 feet (201 m)			
	East Branch Rocky River	1066697	41°24′22″N 81°53′14″W	656 feet (200 m)			

== See also ==
- List of rivers of Ohio
