= First Church of Christ in Euclid =

Historic church in Ohio, United States

- U.S. National Register of Historic Places
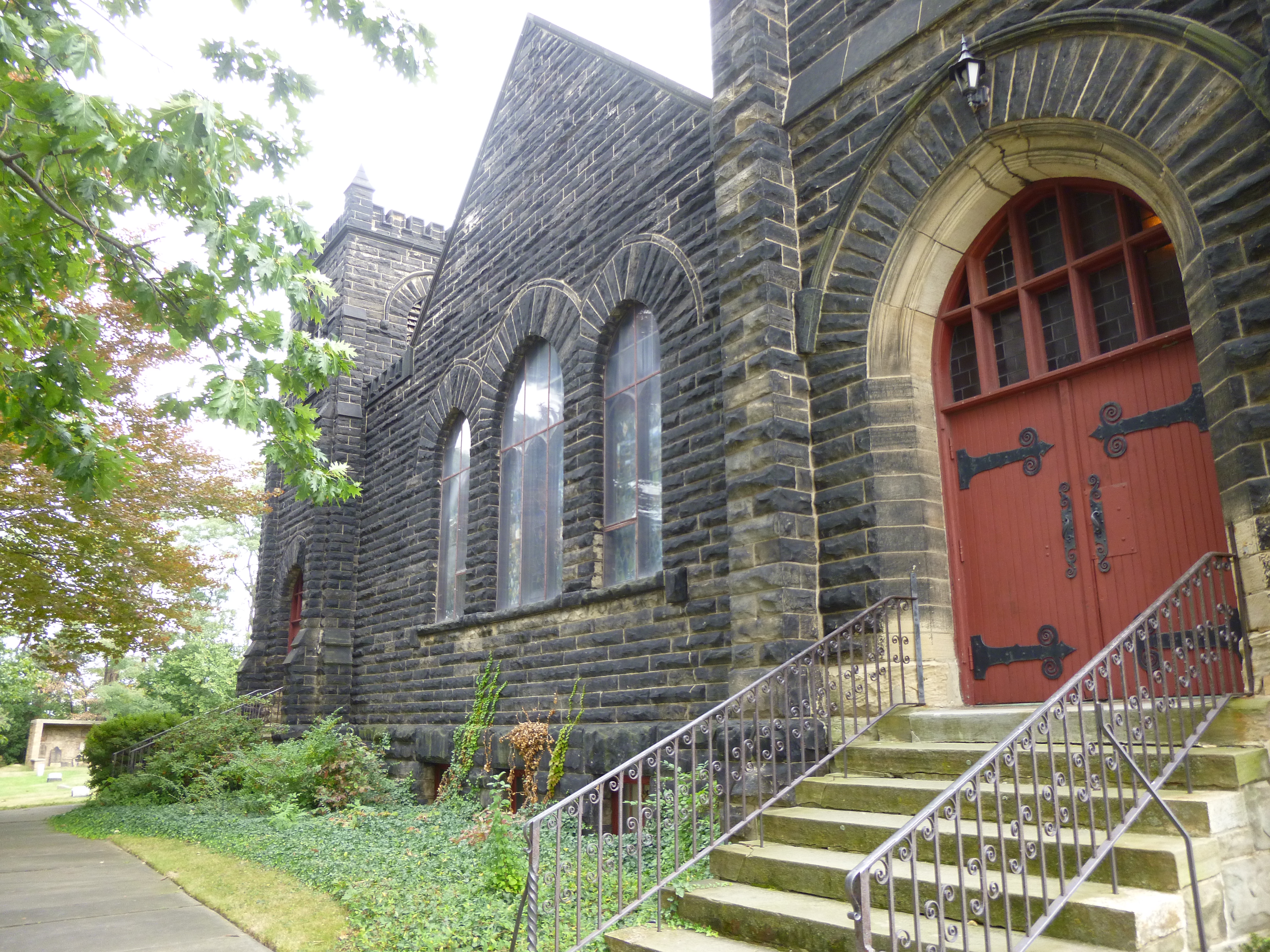

- Location within Ohio Location within the United States
- Location: 16200 Euclid Ave., East Cleveland, Ohio
- Coordinates: 41°32′40″N 81°34′1″W
- Area: 1.8 acres (0.73 ha)
- Built: 1893
- Architect: William Warren Sabin
- Architectural style: Richardsonian Romanesque
- NRHP reference No.: 78002044
- Added to NRHP: November 28, 1978

First Church of Christ in Euclid (also known as the First United Presbyterian Church of East Cleveland) is a historic church at 16200 Euclid Avenue in East Cleveland, Ohio.

It was built in 1893 and added to the National Register in 1978.
