= Baldwin-Wallace College South Campus Historic District =

Historic district in Ohio, United States

- Baldwin-Wallace College; South Campus Historic District
- U.S. National Register of Historic Places
- U.S. Historic district
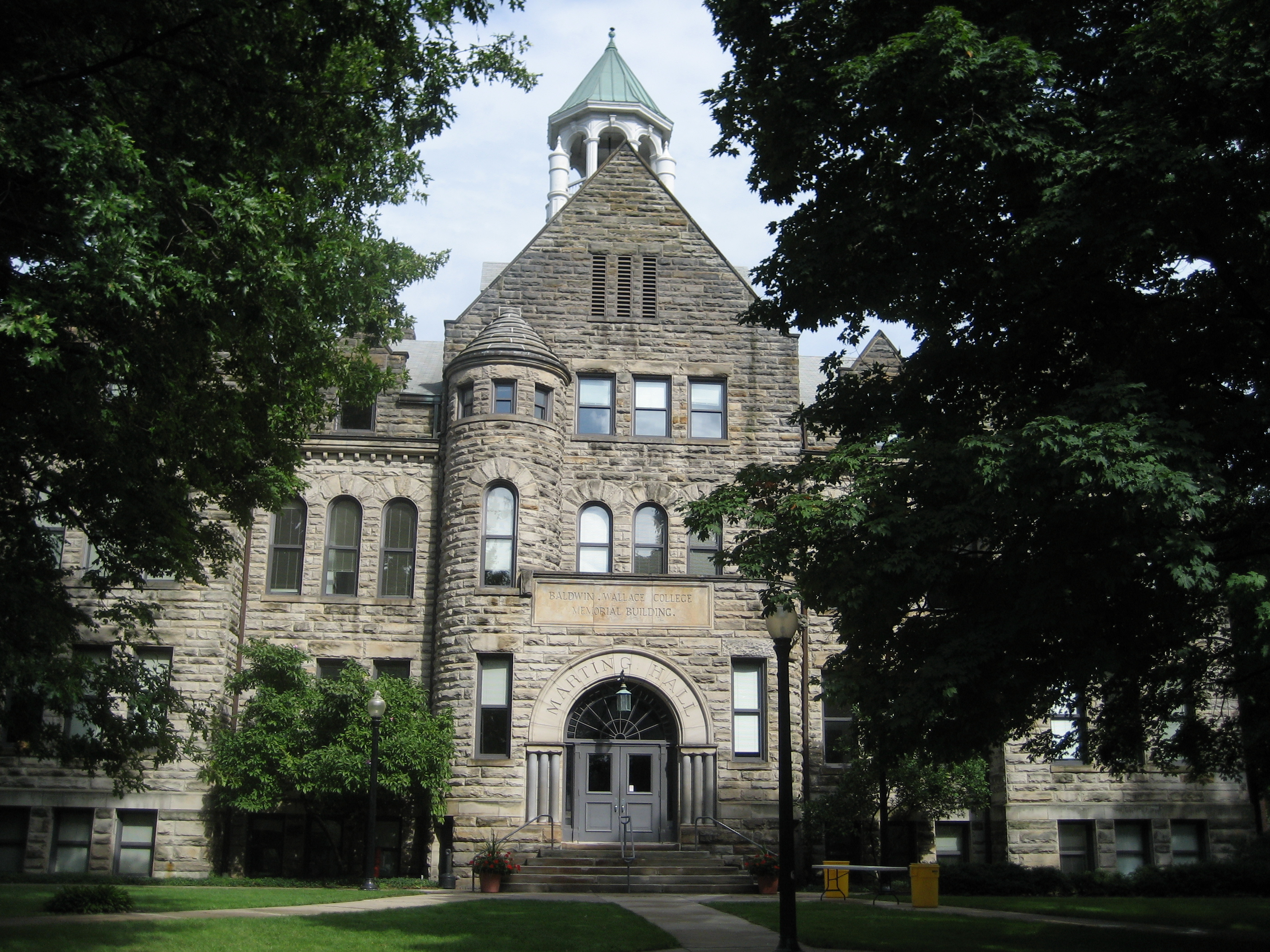
- Marting Hall one of several buildings in the restrict

- Location within Ohio

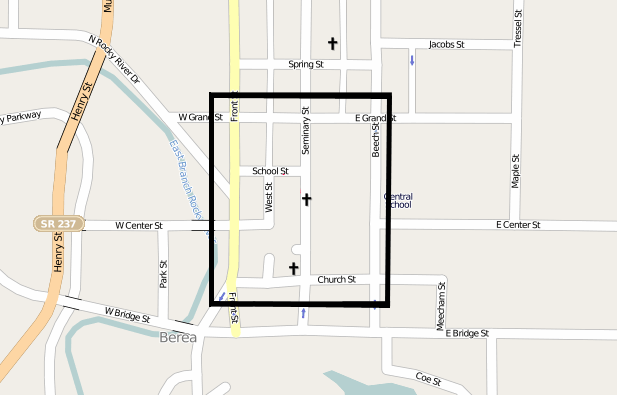
- Map of the Baldwin-Wallace College South Area Historic District
- Location: Berea, Ohio
- Nearest city: Berea, Ohio
- Coordinates: 41°22′4″N 81°51′05″W
- Area: Baldwin Wallace University
- Built: 1950-1974, 1925-1949, 1900-1924, 1875-1899, 1850-1874
- Architectural style: Late Victorian, Mid 19th Century Revival
- NRHP reference No.: 10000315 (original); 100007833 (increase)
- Boundary increase: June 27, 2022

The Baldwin-Wallace College South Campus Historic District is an area of land on the south end of the Baldwin Wallace University campus. When the district was established, the school was Baldwin-Wallace College. BW is a four-year private, coeducation, liberal arts college in Berea, Ohio, United States. The school was founded in 1845 as Baldwin Institute by Methodists settlers. Eventually the school merged with nearby German Wallace College in 1913 to become Baldwin-Wallace College, which adopted the present name in 2012. Several buildings since its founding have been established on the National Register of Historic Places, establishing this area as the Baldwin-Wallace College South Campus Historic District.

== The district ==
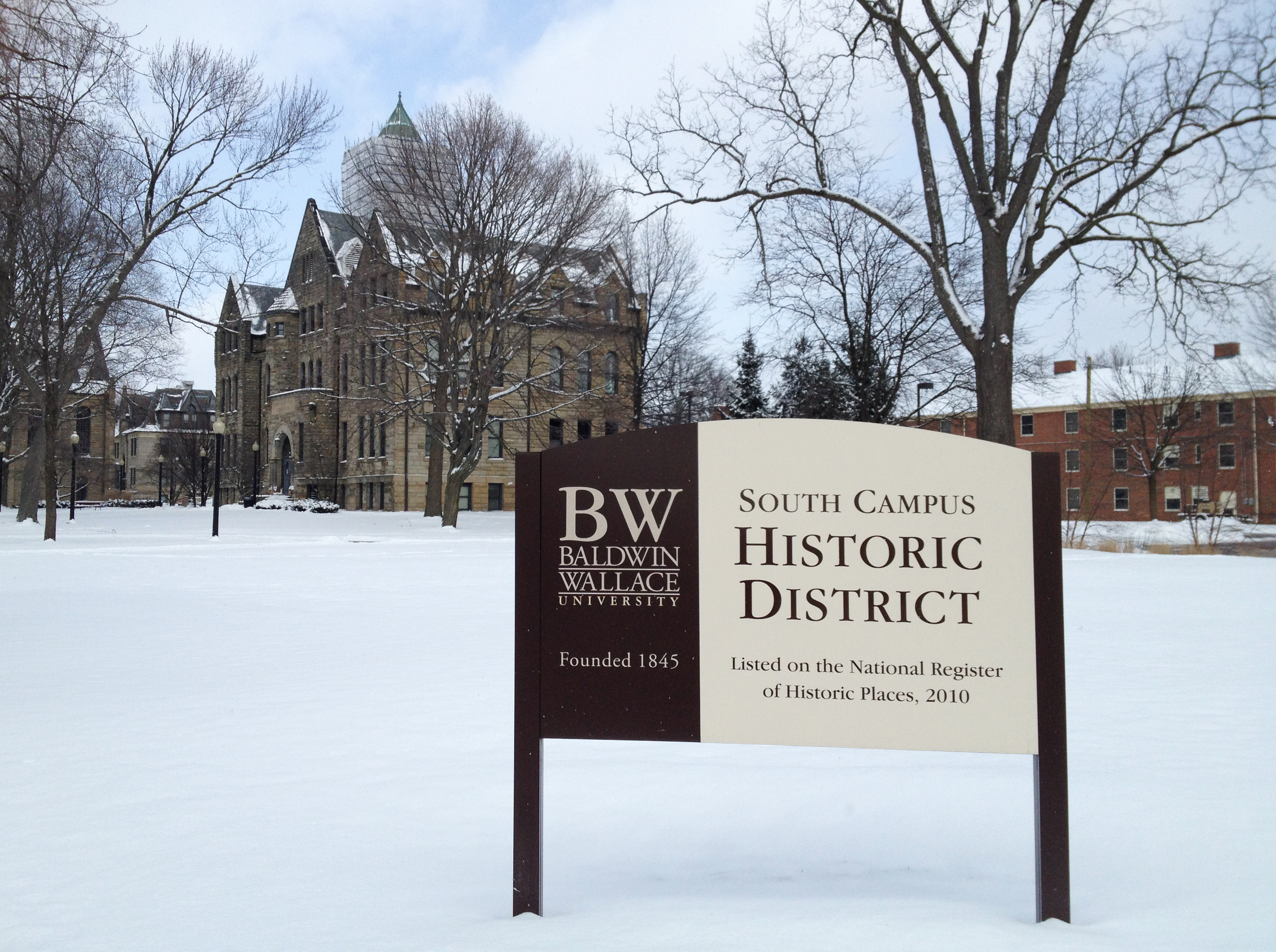
South Campus Historic District sign

The Baldwin-Wallace College South Campus Historic District includes a four-block area that is centered on Seminary Street. The south campus of Baldwin-Wallace College incorporates the former German Wallace College campus, which was centered on the mid-19th century site of the Lyceum Village Square. Both the college and the square are listed in the National Register of Historic Places as the Lyceum Village Square and German Wallace College Historic District in 1975. The Baldwin-Wallace College South Campus Historic District includes a total of 14 buildings and one structure.

The district features a variety of collegiate, religious, and residential buildings in a campus setting, mostly constructed of Berea sandstone and brick between 1866 and 1958, and representative of architectural styles from the late 19th and early 20th century including Gothic Revival, Richardsonian Romanesque, Romanesque Revival, High Victorian Gothic and Colonial Revival.

In 2012, it was announced that Saylor, 63 Beech and Klein halls would be renovated to update their residence hall spaces.

== Building List ==
Image	Building	Address	Architect	Completed	Last Major Renovation	Current usage
	Baldwin-Wallace Gymnasium (Student Activities Center)	96 Beech Street	Unknown	1913-14	2002	Student Activity Center
	Klein Hall	77 Beech Street	Mellenbrook, Foley & Scott	1947-48	2012	Residence Hall
	Davidson Hall	63 Beech Street	Unknown	1929	2012	Residence Hall
	Saylor Hall	77 Beech Street	Mellenbrook, Foley & Scott	1947-48	2012	Residence Hall
	Wallace House	33 Beech Street	Unknown	1885		Honors Program, offices
	Marting Hall	50 Seminary Street	Godfrey Fugman, Cramer and Fugman	1895-96	1986-89	English, History, Religion and Philosophy Classrooms/offices
	Dietsch Hall	66 Seminary Street	unknown	1899	1992	Foreign Languages Classrooms/offices; LADO program
	Lindsay-Crossman Chapel	56 Seminary Street	unknown	1872	1992	Performance Hall/Place of worship
	Kohler Hall	65 Seminary Street	unknown	1858	1961	Residence Hall
	Merner-Pfeiffer Hall	49 Seminary Street	Mellenbrook, Foley & Scott	1939	2011	Cinservatory offices
	Boesel Musical Arts Center (formerly First Congregational Church)	33 Seminary Street	unknown	1869	2011	Music Classrooms/Performance Hall
	Boesel Musical Arts Center	19 Church Street	unknown	1920	1980	Music classroom/office space
	Kulas Musical Arts Building	96 Front Street	unknown	1913	2011	Music classroom/performance hall
	Stone Stairs, Piers, Cheek Walls and Retaining Wall	77 Beech Street	unknown	1890	2013	staircase

== History ==
=== Academic spaces ===
- 19 Church Street: small commercial, two-story, flat-roofed, brick and frame building. The first business to occupy the building was a carpenter's shop that built and supplied wooden caskets.
- Dietsch Hall: originally built as a women's dormitory for German Wallace College in 1899, Dietsch Hall is a contributing building in the Lyceum Village Square and German Wallace College Historic District (NR 1975). The building was converted to an administration building in 1935 and a classroom building in 1970.
- First Congregational Church (Conservatory Annex): Originally known as First Congregational Church of Berea. The church was dedicated in 1872. The building is the oldest still standing structure used as a church in Berea and the original Middleburg Township.
- Kulas Musical Arts Building: Construction of the Auditorium and Music Building, as it was original called, began in 1912 on a site donated by the citizens of Berea. It was dedicated June 2, 1913, two months before Baldwin University and German Wallace College were merged to establish Baldwin-Wallace College.
- Lindsay-Crossman Chapel: Built in the Romanesque Revival style in 1872, Lindsay-Crossman Chapel is a contributing building in the Lyceum Village Square and German Wallace College Historic District (NR 1975).
- Marting Hall: Constructed as the “Memorial Building” and original classroom building for German Wallace College, Marting Hall is a contributing building in the Lyceum Village Square and German Wallace College Historic District (NR 1975). Built in the Richardsonian Romanesque style.
- Merner-Pfeiffer Hall: built in 1939-40 as a men's dormitory and is the fifth building in the Lyceum Village Square and German Wallace College Historic District, which was listed in the National Register of Historic Places in 1975.

=== Administrative spaces ===
- Baldwin-Wallace Gymnasium (Student Activities Center): The Baldwin-Wallace Gymnasium is a large two-story, rectangular, hipped-roof building with a raised basement and random ashlar Berea sandstone walls that faces Beech Street.
- Wallace House: Built c.1884 by James Wallace, the founder of German Wallace College. The former residence is now used as an office by Baldwin-Wallace College for the Honors Program.
- Wallace House Barn: Facing onto Church Street behind Wallace House and sited a few feet off the sidewalk. The garage is used for storage by the maintenance staff of Baldwin-Wallace College.

=== Residence halls ===
- 63 Beech Street: This building along with Klein and Saylor Halls create a dormitory row that faces onto Beech Street.
- Klein Hall: Klein Hall and Saylor Hall are matching buildings built at the same time on either side of 63 Beech, an older dormitory built in 1929. The building continues to be used as a dormitory.
- Kohler Hall: A smaller, first used as the first Methodist Children's Home until German Wallace College bought the building (and the surrounding land) in 1866 for a residence for the vice president of the college who lived in the front rooms of the northeast wing while the rest of the building was used as a men's dormitory. Kohler Hall is a contributing building in the Lyceum Village Square and German Wallace College Historic District (NR 1975).
- Saylor Hall: Saylor Hall and Klein Hall are matching buildings built at the same time. All three building create a dormitory row that faces onto Beech Street. Saylor Hall is a three-story, rectangular, red brick dormitory.

=== Structures ===
- Stone Stairs, Piers, Cheek Walls and Retaining Wall: Originally marking the main entrance to the German Wallace College campus, The stair, piers and cheek walls constructed entirely of Berea sandstone.
