= Wrestling at the 1952 Summer Olympics – Men's freestyle heavyweight =

Wrestling at the Olympics

Men's freestyle heavyweight at the Games of the XV Olympiad
- Venue: Messuhalli
- Dates: 20–23 July 1952
- Competitors: 13 from 13 nations

Medalists
1st place, gold medalist(s)		Arsen Mekokishvili	Soviet Union
2nd place, silver medalist(s)		Bertil Antonsson	Sweden
3rd place, bronze medalist(s)		Ken Richmond	Great Britain

The men's freestyle heavyweight competition at the 1952 Summer Olympics in Helsinki took place from 20 July to 23 July at Messuhalli. Nations were limited to one competitor. Heavyweight was the heaviest category, including wrestlers weighing over 87 kilograms (191.8 lb).

== Competition format ==
This freestyle wrestling competition continued to use the "bad points" elimination system introduced at the 1928 Summer Olympics for Greco-Roman and at the 1932 Summer Olympics for freestyle wrestling, removing the slight modification introduced in 1936 and used until 1948 (which had a reduced penalty for a loss by 2–1 decision). Each round featured all wrestlers pairing off to wrestle one bout, with one wrestler having a bye if there was an odd number. The loser received 3 points, while the winner received 1 point for a win by decision and 0 points for a win by fall. At the end of each round, any wrestler with at least 5 points was eliminated. This elimination continued until the medal rounds, which began when 3 wrestlers remained. These three wrestlers each faced one another in a round-robin medal round (with earlier results counting if they had previously wrestled). The medal round record determined the medals, with bad points used to break ties.

== Results ==
=== Round 1 ===
Bouts

Winner	Nation	Victory Type	Loser	Nation
Arsen Mekokishvili	Soviet Union	Fall	József Kovács	Hungary
Ken Richmond	Great Britain	Fall	Adolfo Ramírez	Argentina
Bertil Antonsson	Sweden	Fall	Josef Růžička	Czechoslovakia
Taisto Kangasniemi	Finland	Fall	Ahad Vafadar	Iran
İrfan Atan	Turkey	Fall	William Kerslake	United States
Natale Vecchi	Italy	Decision, 3–0	Auguste Baarendse	Belgium
Willi Waltner	Germany	Bye	N/A	N/A

Points

Rank	Wrestler	Nation	Start	Earned	Total
1	Bertil Antonsson	Sweden	0	0	0
1	İrfan Atan	Turkey	0	0	0
1	Taisto Kangasniemi	Finland	0	0	0
1	Arsen Mekokishvili	Soviet Union	0	0	0
1	Ken Richmond	Great Britain	0	0	0
1	Willi Waltner	Germany	0	0	0
7	Natale Vecchi	Italy	0	1	1
8	Auguste Baarendse	Belgium	0	3	3
8	William Kerslake	United States	0	3	3
8	József Kovács	Hungary	0	3	3
8	Adolfo Ramírez	Argentina	0	3	3
8	Josef Růžička	Czechoslovakia	0	3	3
8	Ahad Vafadar	Iran	0	3	3

=== Round 2 ===
Bouts

Winner	Nation	Victory Type	Loser	Nation
Arsen Mekokishvili	Soviet Union	Decision, 3–0	Willi Waltner	Germany
Ken Richmond	Great Britain	Decision, 3–0	József Kovács	Hungary
Bertil Antonsson	Sweden	Fall	Adolfo Ramírez	Argentina
Taisto Kangasniemi	Finland	Fall	Josef Růžička	Czechoslovakia
İrfan Atan	Turkey	Decision, 2–1	Ahad Vafadar	Iran
William Kerslake	United States	Fall	Auguste Baarendse	Belgium
Natale Vecchi	Italy	Bye	N/A	N/A

Points

Rank	Wrestler	Nation	Start	Earned	Total
1	Bertil Antonsson	Sweden	0	0	0
1	Taisto Kangasniemi	Finland	0	0	0
3	İrfan Atan	Turkey	0	1	1
3	Arsen Mekokishvili	Soviet Union	0	1	1
3	Ken Richmond	Great Britain	0	1	1
3	Natale Vecchi	Italy	1	0	1
7	William Kerslake	United States	3	0	3
7	Willi Waltner	Germany	0	3	3
9	Auguste Baarendse	Belgium	3	3	6
9	József Kovács	Hungary	3	3	6
9	Adolfo Ramírez	Argentina	3	3	6
9	Josef Růžička	Czechoslovakia	3	3	6
9	Ahad Vafadar	Iran	3	3	6

=== Round 3 ===
Bouts

Winner	Nation	Victory Type	Loser	Nation
Willi Waltner	Germany	Decision, 2–1	Natale Vecchi	Italy
Arsen Mekokishvili	Soviet Union	Decision, 2–1	Ken Richmond	Great Britain
Bertil Antonsson	Sweden	Decision, 2–1	İrfan Atan	Turkey
William Kerslake	United States	Fall	Taisto Kangasniemi	Finland

Points

Rank	Wrestler	Nation	Start	Earned	Total
1	Bertil Antonsson	Sweden	0	1	1
2	Arsen Mekokishvili	Soviet Union	1	1	2
3	Taisto Kangasniemi	Finland	0	3	3
3	William Kerslake	United States	3	0	3
5	İrfan Atan	Turkey	1	3	4
5	Ken Richmond	Great Britain	1	3	4
5	Natale Vecchi	Italy	1	3	4
5	Willi Waltner	Germany	3	1	4

=== Round 4 ===
Kerslake took 5th place over Kangasniemi due to head-to-head results from round 3.

Bouts

Winner	Nation	Victory Type	Loser	Nation
Arsen Mekokishvili	Soviet Union	Fall	Natale Vecchi	Italy
Ken Richmond	Great Britain	Fall	Willi Waltner	Germany
Bertil Antonsson	Sweden	Decision, 2–1	William Kerslake	United States
İrfan Atan	Turkey	Decision, 3–0	Taisto Kangasniemi	Finland

Points

Rank	Wrestler	Nation	Start	Earned	Total
1	Bertil Antonsson	Sweden	1	1	2
1	Arsen Mekokishvili	Soviet Union	2	0	2
3	Ken Richmond	Great Britain	4	0	4
4	İrfan Atan	Turkey	4	1	5
5	William Kerslake	United States	3	3	6
6	Taisto Kangasniemi	Finland	3	3	6
7	Natale Vecchi	Italy	4	3	7
7	Willi Waltner	Germany	4	3	7

=== Medal rounds ===
Mekokishvili's victory over Richmond counted for the medal rounds. Mekokishvili then defeated Antonsson to win the gold medal at 2–0 against the other medalists. Antonsson then faced Richmond for the silver medal, with the Swede winning.

Bouts

Winner	Nation	Victory Type	Loser	Nation
Arsen Mekokishvili	Soviet Union	Decision, 2–1	Bertil Antonsson	Sweden
Bertil Antonsson	Sweden	Fall	Ken Richmond	Great Britain

Points

Rank	Wrestler	Nation	Wins	Losses	Start	Earned	Total
1st place, gold medalist(s)	Arsen Mekokishvili	Soviet Union	2	0	2	1	3
2nd place, silver medalist(s)	Bertil Antonsson	Sweden	1	1	2	3	5
3rd place, bronze medalist(s)	Ken Richmond	Great Britain	0	2	4	3	7
