= Joe Bachie =

American football player (born 1998)

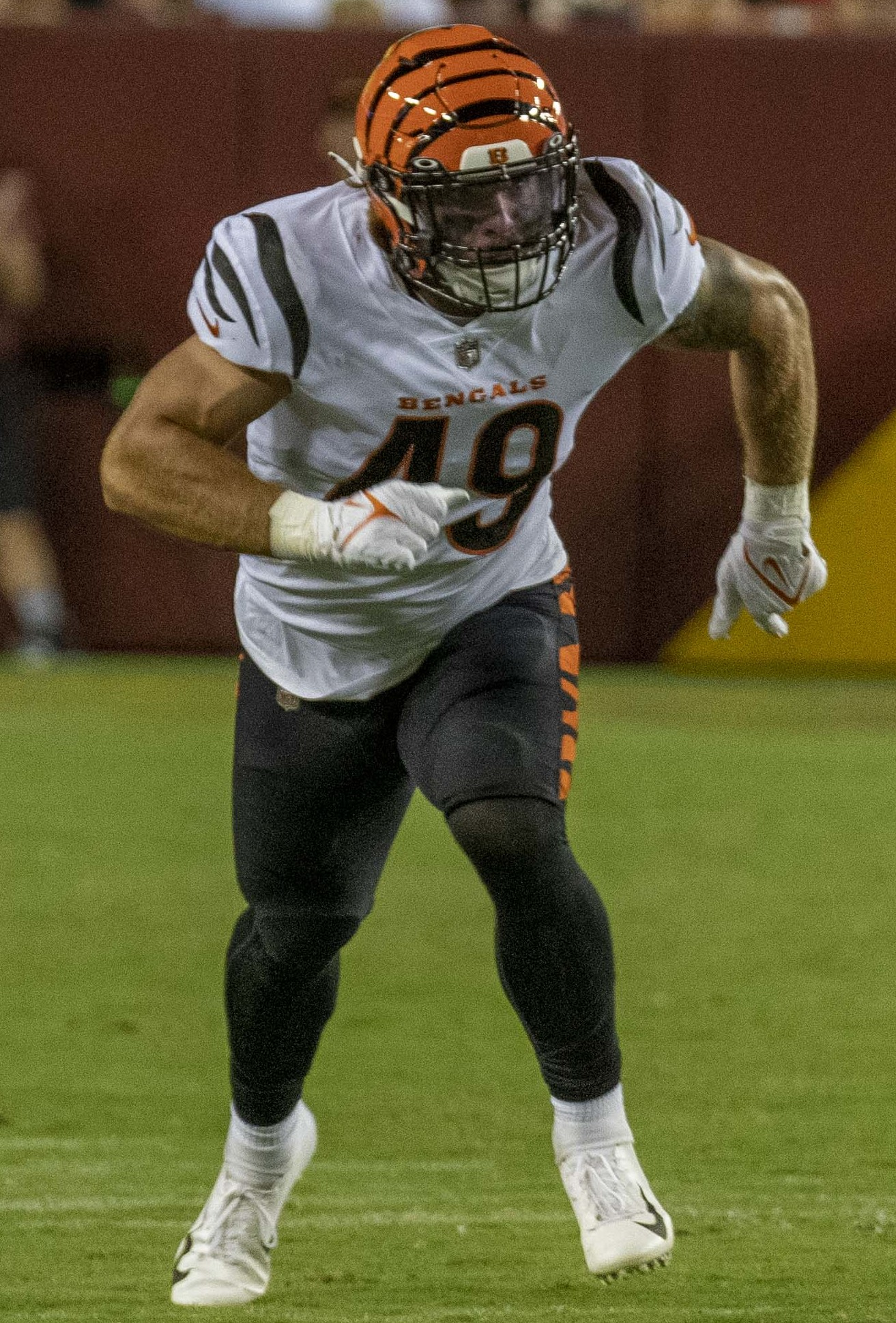
- Bachie with the Cincinnati Bengals in 2021

No. 35 – Detroit Lions
- Position: Linebacker
- Roster status: Active

Personal information
- Born: February 26, 1998 (age 28); Brook Park, Ohio, U.S.
- Listed height: 6 ft 2 in (1.88 m)
- Listed weight: 235 lb (107 kg)

Career information
- High school: Berea–Midpark High School (Berea, Ohio)
- College: Michigan State (2016–2019)
- NFL draft: 2020: undrafted

Career history
- New Orleans Saints (2020)*; Philadelphia Eagles (2020); Cincinnati Bengals (2021–2024); Indianapolis Colts (2025); Tennessee Titans (2025); Detroit Lions (2026–present)
- * Offseason or practice squad member only

Awards and highlights
- First-team All-Big Ten (2018); 2× Third-team All-Big Ten (2017, 2019)

Career NFL statistics as of 2025
- Total tackles: 77
- Pass deflections: 2
- Stats at Pro Football Reference

Joe Bachie (born February 26, 1998) is an American professional football linebacker for the Detroit Lions of the National Football League (NFL). He played college football for the Michigan State Spartans. Bachie was signed by the New Orleans Saints as an undrafted free agent following the 2020 NFL Draft. He has previously played in the NFL for the Philadelphia Eagles, Cincinnati Bengals, Indianapolis Colts, and Tennessee Titans.

== Early life ==
Bachie grew-up in Brook Park, Ohio (the Back Porch). As a child he played for the "Red" team then he would go inside, change, and come out playing for the "Blue" team. Bachie attended Berea-Midpark High School where he was ranked among the nation's top inside linebackers by Rivals.com and 247Sports.com. He was listed among the country's top outside linebackers by Scout.com and rated among Ohio's top seniors by Rivals.com. He led his team in tackles, tackles for loss, quarterback hurries and rushing touchdowns as a senior. Bachie also played basketball and baseball in high school, earning all-conference honors in both sports as a junior.

== College career ==
Bachie was a member of the Michigan State Spartans for four seasons. He tested positive for a banned performance-enhancing substance during his senior season, ending his collegiate career prematurely. In eight games, Bachie recorded 71 tackles, 8.5 tackles for loss and 3.5 sacks with four passes defended and an interception and was named third-team All-Big Ten by the media. Bachie finished his collegiate career with 285 tackles, 27.5 tackles for loss and eight sacks with five interceptions, 11 passes broken up, five forced fumbles, and two fumble recoveries in 40 games played.

== Professional career ==
Pre-draft measurables
Height	Weight	Arm length	Hand span	Wingspan	40-yard dash	10-yard split	20-yard split	20-yard shuttle	Three-cone drill	Vertical jump	Broad jump	Bench press
6 ft 1 in (1.85 m)	230 lb (104 kg)	31 5/8 in (0.80 m)	10 1/4 in (0.26 m)	6 ft 4 7/8 in (1.95 m)	4.67 s	1.57 s	2.69 s	4.34 s	6.93 s	33.5 in (0.85 m)	9 ft 11 in (3.02 m)	26 reps
All values from NFL Combine

=== New Orleans Saints ===
Bachie was signed by the New Orleans Saints as an undrafted free agent on May 13, 2020. Bachie was waived by New Orleans on September 5 as a part of final roster cuts; he was re-signed to the team's practice squad the following day.

=== Philadelphia Eagles ===
On December 7, 2020, Bachie was signed by the Philadelphia Eagles off of the Saints' practice squad. He was waived by the Eagles on May 25, 2021.

=== Cincinnati Bengals ===
On May 26, 2021, Bachie was claimed off waivers by the Cincinnati Bengals. He was waived on August 31, and re-signed to the practice squad the next day. Bachie was promoted to the Bengals' active roster on October 16 and saw his first game action against the Detroit Lions. He was signed to the active roster on October 26. He was placed on injured reserve on December 21, after suffering a knee injury in Week 14.

On March 11, 2022, Bachie re-signed with the Bengals on a one-year contract. On August 30, Bachie was placed on the reserve/PUP list to start the season. He was activated on October 22.

Bachie signed a one–year contract extension with the Bengals on March 9, 2023.

=== Indianapolis Colts ===
On May 7, 2025, Bachie signed with the Indianapolis Colts. He made five starts for the Colts, recording one pass deflection and 26 combined tackles. On October 8, Bachie was placed on injured reserve due to a toe injury suffered in Week 5 against the Las Vegas Raiders. He was waived with an injury settlement on October 15.

=== Tennessee Titans ===
On October 17, 2025, Bachie was signed to the Tennessee Titans' practice squad. He was promoted to the active roster on October 23.

=== Detroit Lions ===
On April 29, 2026, Bachie signed with the Detroit Lions. On August 30, Bachie was released by the Lions as a part of final roster cuts; he was re-signed to the team's practice squad the following day. On September 7, Bachie was signed to the active roster. He was released by Detroit again on September 22, but added back to the practice squad the next day. On November 4, he was signed to the active roster.
