= Midpark High School =

Location
- 7000 Paula Drive; Middleburg Heights, Ohio 44130; United States; 41°22′41″N 81°48′19″W

Information
- Type: Public, coeducational
- Established: 1962
- Closed: 2013
- School district: Berea City School District
- Grades: 9–12
- Colors: Brown and orange
- Fight song: Stand Up And Cheer
- Athletics conference: Southwestern Conference
- Team name: Meteors
- Rival: Berea High School
- Communities served: Middleburg Heights and Brook Park
- Feeder schools: Ford Middle School

Midpark High School was a public high school located in Middleburg Heights, Ohio, southwest of Cleveland. It was one of two high schools in the Berea City School District, along with Berea High School. Founded in 1962, it primarily served Middleburg Heights and Brook Park, as well as a portion of Berea. MHS athletic teams were known as the Meteors with school colors of orange and brown and competed in the Southwestern Conference.

At the conclusion of the 2012–13 school year, the school was closed and merged with rival Berea High School to create Berea–Midpark High School, which was initially located in the building that previously housed Berea High School. Beginning with the 2013–14 school year, the Midpark building became Middleburg Heights Junior High School for the district's 7th–9th grade students. In August 2018, the building was renamed Berea–Midpark Middle School for grades five through eight, while ninth graders were moved to Berea–Midpark High School.

== Notable alumni ==
- Michael Cavanaugh, musician
- Eric Ewazen, composer
- Diana Glyer, award winning author
- John Guzik, professional football player in the National Football League
- Melanie Miller, politician
- Aman Sharma, actor (adult films)
- Ken Kravec, professional baseball player, scout, and executive in Major League Baseball
- Tony Rizzo, television and ESPN radio sports commentator in Cleveland’s media market.
- Lee Roberts, professional basketball player in multiple leagues
