= Wrestling at the 1952 Summer Olympics – Men's Greco-Roman heavyweight =

Wrestling at the Olympics

Men's Greco-Roman heavyweight at the Games of the XV Olympiad
- Venue: Messuhalli
- Dates: 24–27 July 1952
- Competitors: 10 from 10 nations

Medalists
| 1st place, gold medalist(s) | | Johannes Kotkas | Soviet Union |
| 2nd place, silver medalist(s) | | Josef Růžička | Czechoslovakia |
| 3rd place, bronze medalist(s) | | Tauno Kovanen | Finland |

The men's Greco-Roman heavyweight competition at the 1952 Summer Olympics in Helsinki took place from 24 July to 27 July at Messuhalli. Nations were limited to one competitor. Heavyweight was the heaviest category, including wrestlers weighing over 87 kilograms (191.8 lb).

== Competition format ==
This Greco-Roman wrestling competition continued to use the "bad points" elimination system introduced at the 1928 Summer Olympics for Greco-Roman and at the 1932 Summer Olympics for freestyle wrestling, removing the slight modification introduced in 1936 and used until 1948 (which had a reduced penalty for a loss by 2–1 decision). Each round featured all wrestlers pairing off and wrestling one bout (with one wrestler having a bye if there were an odd number). The loser received three points. The winner received one point if the win was by decision and zero points if the win was by fall. At the end of each round, any wrestler with at least five points was eliminated. This elimination continued until the medal rounds, which began when three wrestlers remained. These three wrestlers each faced each other in a round-robin medal round (with earlier results counting, if any had wrestled another before); record within the medal round determined medals, with bad points breaking ties.

== Results ==
=== Round 1 ===
Bouts

| Winner | Nation | Victory Type | Loser | Nation |
|---|---|---|---|---|
| Willi Waltner | Germany | Walkover | K. Richmond (Note: Richmond of Great Britain and Baarendse of Belgium are listed as participating by the Official Report, but neither wrestler actually competed—both losing their first-round matches by walkover and not competing thereafter.) | Great Britain |
| Antonios Georgoulis | Greece | Fall | Adolfo Ramírez | Argentina |
| Tauno Kovanen | Finland | Decision, 3–0 | Alexandru Şuli | Romania |
| Josef Růžička | Czechoslovakia | Fall | József Kovács | Hungary |
| Johannes Kotkas | Soviet Union | Walkover | A. Baarendse | Belgium |
| Bengt Fahlkvist | Sweden | Fall | Guido Fantoni | Italy |

Points

| Rank | Wrestler | Nation | Start | Earned | Total |
|---|---|---|---|---|---|
| 1 | Bengt Fahlkvist | Sweden | 0 | 0 | 0 |
| 1 | Antonios Georgoulis | Greece | 0 | 0 | 0 |
| 1 | Johannes Kotkas | Soviet Union | 0 | 0 | 0 |
| 1 | Josef Růžička | Czechoslovakia | 0 | 0 | 0 |
| 1 | Willi Waltner | Germany | 0 | 0 | 0 |
| 6 | Tauno Kovanen | Finland | 0 | 1 | 1 |
| 7 | Guido Fantoni | Italy | 0 | 3 | 3 |
| 7 | József Kovács | Hungary | 0 | 3 | 3 |
| 7 | Adolfo Ramírez | Argentina | 0 | 3 | 3 |
| 7 | Alexandru Şuli | Romania | 0 | 3 | 3 |

=== Round 2 ===
Bouts

| Winner | Nation | Victory Type | Loser | Nation |
|---|---|---|---|---|
| Willi Waltner | Germany | Decision, 3–0 | Antonios Georgoulis | Greece |
| Tauno Kovanen | Finland | Decision, 3–0 | Adolfo Ramírez | Argentina |
| Alexandru Şuli | Romania | Decision, 2–1 | József Kovács | Hungary |
| Guido Fantoni | Italy | Decision, 2–1 | Josef Růžička | Czechoslovakia |
| Johannes Kotkas | Soviet Union | Fall | Bengt Fahlkvist | Sweden |

Points

| Rank | Wrestler | Nation | Start | Earned | Total |
|---|---|---|---|---|---|
| 1 | Johannes Kotkas | Soviet Union | 0 | 0 | 0 |
| 2 | Willi Waltner | Germany | 0 | 1 | 1 |
| 3 | Tauno Kovanen | Finland | 1 | 1 | 2 |
| 4 | Bengt Fahlkvist | Sweden | 0 | 3 | 3 |
| 4 | Antonios Georgoulis | Greece | 0 | 3 | 3 |
| 4 | Josef Růžička | Czechoslovakia | 0 | 3 | 3 |
| 7 | Guido Fantoni | Italy | 3 | 1 | 4 |
| 7 | Alexandru Şuli | Romania | 3 | 1 | 4 |
| 9 | József Kovács | Hungary | 3 | 3 | 6 |
| 9 | Adolfo Ramírez | Argentina | 3 | 3 | 6 |

=== Round 3 ===
Bouts

| Winner | Nation | Victory Type | Loser | Nation |
|---|---|---|---|---|
| | Decision, 3–0 | | | |
| Tauno Kovanen | Finland | Decision, 3–0 | Willi Waltner | Germany |
| Alexandru Şuli | Romania | Decision, 3–0 | Antonios Georgoulis | Greece |
| Josef Růžička | Czechoslovakia | Fall | Bengt Fahlkvist | Sweden |
| Johannes Kotkas | Soviet Union | Fall | Guido Fantoni | Italy |

Points

| Rank | Wrestler | Nation | Start | Earned | Total |
|---|---|---|---|---|---|
| 1 | Johannes Kotkas | Soviet Union | 0 | 0 | 0 |
| 2 | Tauno Kovanen | Finland | 2 | 1 | 3 |
| 2 | Josef Růžička | Czechoslovakia | 3 | 0 | 3 |
| 4 | Willi Waltner | Germany | 1 | 3 | 4 |
| 5 | Alexandru Şuli | Romania | 4 | 1 | 5 |
| 6 | Bengt Fahlkvist | Sweden | 3 | 3 | 6 |
| 6 | Antonios Georgoulis | Greece | 3 | 3 | 6 |
| 8 | Guido Fantoni | Italy | 4 | 3 | 7 |

=== Round 4 ===
Bouts

| Winner | Nation | Victory Type | Loser | Nation |
|---|---|---|---|---|
| Josef Růžička | Czechoslovakia | Fall | Willi Waltner | Germany |
| Johannes Kotkas | Soviet Union | Fall | Tauno Kovanen | Finland |

Points

| Rank | Wrestler | Nation | Start | Earned | Total |
|---|---|---|---|---|---|
| 1 | Johannes Kotkas | Soviet Union | 0 | 0 | 0 |
| 2 | Josef Růžička | Czechoslovakia | 3 | 0 | 3 |
| 3 | Tauno Kovanen | Finland | 3 | 3 | 6 |
| 4 | Willi Waltner | Germany | 4 | 3 | 7 |

=== Medal rounds ===
Kotkas's victory over Kovanen in round 4 counted for the medal rounds.

Bouts

| Winner | Nation | Victory Type | Loser | Nation |
|---|---|---|---|---|
| Josef Růžička | Czechoslovakia | Fall | Tauno Kovanen | Finland |
| Johannes Kotkas | Soviet Union | Fall | Josef Růžička | Czechoslovakia |

Points

| Rank | Wrestler | Nation | Wins | Losses | Start | Earned | Total |
|---|---|---|---|---|---|---|---|
| 1st place, gold medalist(s) | Johannes Kotkas | Soviet Union | 2 | 0 | 0 | 0 | 0 |
| 2nd place, silver medalist(s) | Josef Růžička | Czechoslovakia | 1 | 1 | 3 | 3 | 6 |
| 3rd place, bronze medalist(s) | Tauno Kovanen | Finland | 0 | 2 | 6 | 3 | 9 |
