= Ford Middle School =

Ford Middle School may refer to:

- Ford Middle School in Berea, Ohio
- Ford Middle School in Allen, Texas

== Other ==
- Fords Middle School in Woodbridge Township, New Jersey
