= Berea High School =

Defunct high school in Berea, Ohio (1882 - 2013)

Location
- 165 East Bagley Road; Berea, Ohio 44017; United States; 41°22′24″N 81°50′43″W

Information
- Type: Public, coeducational
- Established: 1882
- Closed: 2013
- School district: Berea City School District
- Grades: 9–12
- Colors: Scarlet and blue
- Athletics conference: Southwestern Conference
- Team name: Braves
- Accreditation: Ohio Department of Education
- Communities served: Berea; Brook Park
- Feeder schools: Roehm Middle School; Ford Middle School
- Website: www.berea.k12.oh.us/bhs/site/default.asp

Berea High School (BHS) was a high school located in Berea, Ohio, United States. It was founded in 1882 and served students in grades nine through 12. Its most recent campus, located immediately east of Baldwin Wallace University, was built in 1929. It was the first of two public high schools in the Berea City School District, along with Midpark High School, which opened in 1962. Both BHS and Midpark were closed in 2013 at the conclusion of the 2012–13 school year and were consolidated at the BHS campus to form Berea–Midpark High School. Berea's school colors were scarlet and royal blue, and its athletic teams were known as the Braves. The school's fight song was Ohio State University's "Across the Field".

== Building history ==
The final home of Berea High was originally built between the years of 1927 and 1929. It was built to replace the older school, built sometime around the 1890s, that was on the corner of Beech and Union Street. The older school, along with Central School (another building in the Berea City School District that was built in the 1880s) were sold to Baldwin Wallace University in the 1970s and torn down shortly after.

There were a total of six to ten hallways with red tile for the floor, solid wood floors and doors and desks for classrooms, and a tower that was visible (the bottom of it was the original entrance). The tower was originally going to be used to store books, but in 1927 the fire marshall said it was unsafe. There was no gymnasium, but there was a two-story auditorium with a wooden stage, velvet seats, and gargoyles on the outside.

The first major change happened in the mid-1950s, with the addition of the two-story science wing, which was attached to the east side of the building. There was a three-story gymnasium as well. This wing also included a brand new 12-foot deep pool with a rainbow ceiling for swim meets. Instead of red tile on the floor, constructors went with orange tile.

The 1960s saw more additions and modifications due to the increase in population. Six hallways and a library named after the longtime principal, J.B Crabbs, were completed by 1967. This addition called for the original building to be covered up again on the south side. Also with this new addition, the original main entrance was covered up, only now to be accessible as a walkthrough from the 130s to the new wing. The original doors were still on it until its demolition.

With the new addition, the school district turned to Robert Fillous, a 1935 Cleveland Institute of Art graduate to design/purchase a sculpture to be added to the outside. This sculpture was the Tree of Knowledge, a 1967 15' by 10' metal cast sculpture that showcased the arts, math, science, and history at the bottom in the shape of eyes. Notable places in Ohio, such as the Glenn Research Center, Cleveland Hopkins International Airport, and Rocky River are also featured on the sculpture. The sculpture is currently at the bus lot, waiting for restoration so it can go on the new high school sometime in 2022-2023.

Other additions have been added as well, such as the cafeteria, which replaced the one in the basement, a bigger parking lot, and an art hallway (Originally for shop classes) that was added onto the west side of the building. In 1994, the district decided to expand once again, this time with the Sports Center. The two-story building was added to the side of the building facing Eastland Road. It had a track, basketball hoops, and a large area for gathering before sporting events. All of these additions covered up the 1920s part of the school, and only the clock tower, smoke stack, and west side of the building are now visible.

In 2013, Berea High and Midpark High were consolidated to create Berea–Midpark High School. It used the old Berea High School building until March 13, 2020. A brand new $71.3 million school built behind the old building opened its doors in September 2020. A farewell walkthrough happened on June 7, 2020. Demolition of the building began on August 17, 2020, with the Sports Center and ended on November 12, 2020, with the demolition of the tower.

== Notable alumni ==
- Joe Bachie, professional football linebacker
- Charles Bassett, class of 1950, NASA astronaut
- Tim Beckman, class of 1983, head coach in college football
- Bud Collins, class of 1947, television commentator, sportswriter and member of International Tennis Hall of Fame
- Passion Richardson, class of 1993, professional track athlete/coach University of Kentucky
- Chris Scott, professional football player in the NFL
- Alex Stepanovich, class of 2000, professional football player in the NFL
- John-Michael Tebelak, class of 1966, Broadway director, creator of the musical Godspell
- Jim Tressel, class of 1971, head coach in college football, president of Youngstown State University

== State championships ==
- Gymnastics – 1983
