= Smith Elementary =

Smith Elementary School or Smith Elementary may refer to the following elementary schools:

- Smith Elementary in Aurora, Illinois, part of West Aurora Public School District 129.
- Smith Elementary in Austin, Texas, part of Del Valle Independent School District.
- Smith Elementary in Berea, Ohio, a former school part of Berea City School District.
- Smith Elementary in Owasso, Oklahoma, part of Owasso Public Schools.
