= John Guzik =

John Guzik may refer to:

- John Guzik (linebacker) (1936–2012), American football player
- John Guzik (defensive lineman) (born 1962), American football player
