= Waltner =

Waltner is a surname. Notable people with the surname include:

- Charles Albert Waltner (1846–1925), French artist and etcher
- David Waltner-Toews (born 1948), Canadian epidemiologist, essayist, poet, fiction writer, abd veterinarian
- Róbert Waltner (born 1977), Hungarian football player and coach
- Willi Waltner (1934–1966), German wrestler
