= İrfan Atan =

Turkish wrestler

Personal information
- Nationality: Turkish
- Born: 1 January 1928 Adapazarı, Turkey
- Died: 12 April 2004 (aged 76)

Sport
- Sport: Wrestling

İrfan Atan (1 January 1928 – 12 April 2004) was a Turkish wrestler. He competed in the men's freestyle heavyweight at the 1952 Summer Olympics.
