= Tauno Kovanen =

Finnish wrestler (1917–1986)

Personal information
- Nationality: Finnish
- Born: 20 June 1917 Kuru, Ylöjärvi
- Died: 9 February 1986 (aged 68)

Sport
- Sport: Wrestling
Medal record
Representing Finland
Men's Greco-Roman wrestling
Olympic Games
| Bronze medal – third place | 1952 Helsinki | Heavyweight |

Tauno Kovanen (20 June 1917 – 9 February 1986) was a Finnish wrestler. He was born in Kuru. He won an Olympic bronze medal in Greco-Roman wrestling in 1952.

Kovanen was a policeman by profession.
