= Chris Scott (defensive end) =

American football player (born 1961)

No. 95, 72
- Position: Defensive end

Personal information
- Born: December 11, 1961 (age 64); Berea, Ohio, U.S.
- Listed height: 6 ft 5 in (1.96 m)
- Listed weight: 260 lb (118 kg)

Career information
- High school: Berea
- College: Purdue (1980–1983)
- NFL draft: 1984: 3rd round, 66th overall pick

Career history
- Indianapolis Colts (1984–1985, 1987); Miami Dolphins (1988)

Awards and highlights
- Second-team All-Big Ten (1983)

Career NFL statistics
- Sacks: 5
- Stats at Pro Football Reference

Christopher Sterling Scott (born December 11, 1961) is an American former professional football player who was a defensive end for three seasons with the Indianapolis Colts of the National Football League (NFL). He was selected by the Colts in the third round of the 1984 NFL draft. He played college football for the Purdue Boilermakers.

== Early life and college ==
Christopher Sterling Scott was born on December 11, 1961, in Berea, Ohio. He attended Berea High School in Berea, Ohio.

Scott played college football for the Boilermakers at Purdue University from 1980 to 1983. He was named second-team All-Big Ten by United Press International in 1983.

== Professional career ==
Scott was selected by the Indianapolis Colts in the third round, with the 66th overall pick, of the 1984 NFL draft and by the Memphis Showboats in the second round, with the 40th overall pick, of the 1984 USFL draft. He officially signed with the Colts on July 14. He played in 14 games, starting two, for the Colts during the 1984 season. Scott appeared in all 16 games, starting 14, in 1985 and recorded five sacks. He was released on September 1, 1986. He signed with the Colts again the next year on July 22, 1987. He was released on August 11. On September 28, Scott re-signed with the Colts during the 1987 NFL players strike. He started all three strike games for the Colts and was released on October 19 after the strike ended.

Scott signed a futures contract with the Miami Dolphins on December 18, 1987. He was placed on injured reserve on July 14, 1988, and spent the entire 1988 season there. He was released on April 29, 1989, after failing a physical.
