= Alexandru Șuli =

Romanian wrestler

Personal information
- Nationality: Romanian
- Born: 10 August 1928 Lugoj, Romania
- Died: 2000 (aged 71–72) Sfântu Gheorghe, Romania

Sport
- Sport: Wrestling

Alexandru Șuli (10 August 1928 – 2000) was a Romanian wrestler. He competed in the men's Greco-Roman heavyweight at the 1952 Summer Olympics.
