= Berea–Midpark High School =

Coordinates: 41.3731°N 81.8452°W

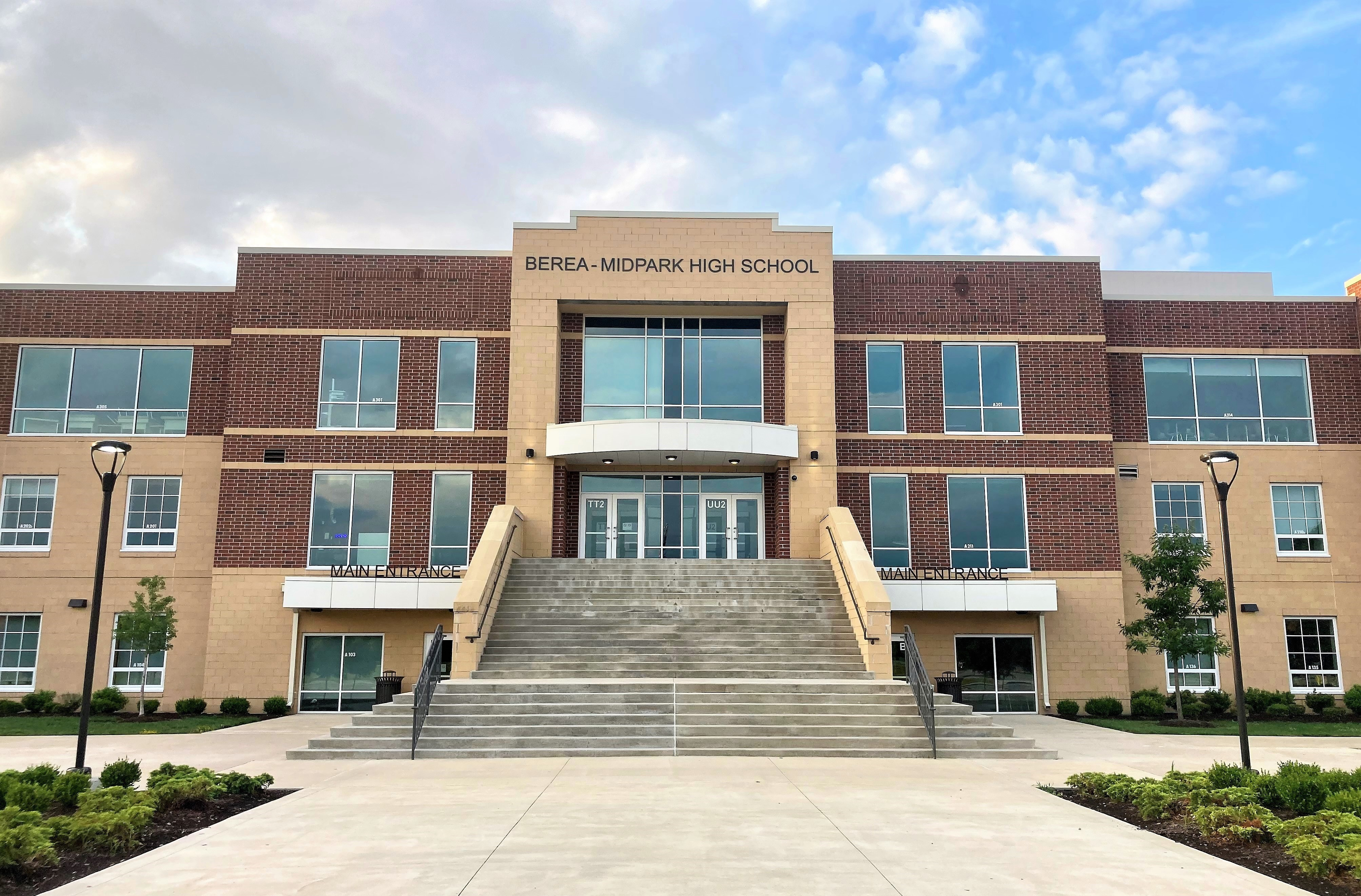

Location
- 165 East Bagley Road; Berea, Ohio 44017; United States

Information
- Type: Public
- Opened: 2013
- School district: Berea City School District
- NCES School ID: 390436000175
- Principal: Mark Smithberger
- Teaching staff: 86.28 (FTE)
- Grades: 9–12
- Enrollment: 1,694 (2024–25)
- Student to teacher ratio: 19.63
- Campus type: Suburban
- Colors: Blue and orange
- Fight song: Hail Titans
- Athletics conference: Southwestern Conference
- Team name: Titans
- Rival: Olmsted Falls
- Accreditation: Ohio Department of Education
- Communities served: Berea; Middleburg Heights; Brook Park; Olmsted Falls
- Website: bmhs.berea.k12.oh.us

Berea–Midpark High School (BMHS) is a public high school in Berea, Ohio, United States, and is the only high school in the Berea City School District. The school was formed in 2013 from a consolidation of Berea High School and Midpark High School due to declining enrollment. It is located on a campus immediately east of Baldwin Wallace University and is housed in a building that opened in August 2020.

Previously, BMHS was housed in the former Berea High School building on the same campus. That building opened in 1929 with additions in 1954, 1964, and 1995, and was demolished between August and November 2020. The new building, built on the same campus as the previous school, opened for the 2020-21 school year. As of the 2024–25 school year, BMHS has approximately 1,700 students in grades 9 through 12. Athletic teams are known as the Titans, and the school colors are blue and orange, with the blue coming from Berea High School and the orange from Midpark High School.
