= John Wheeler House (Berea, Ohio) =

- U.S. National Register of Historic Places
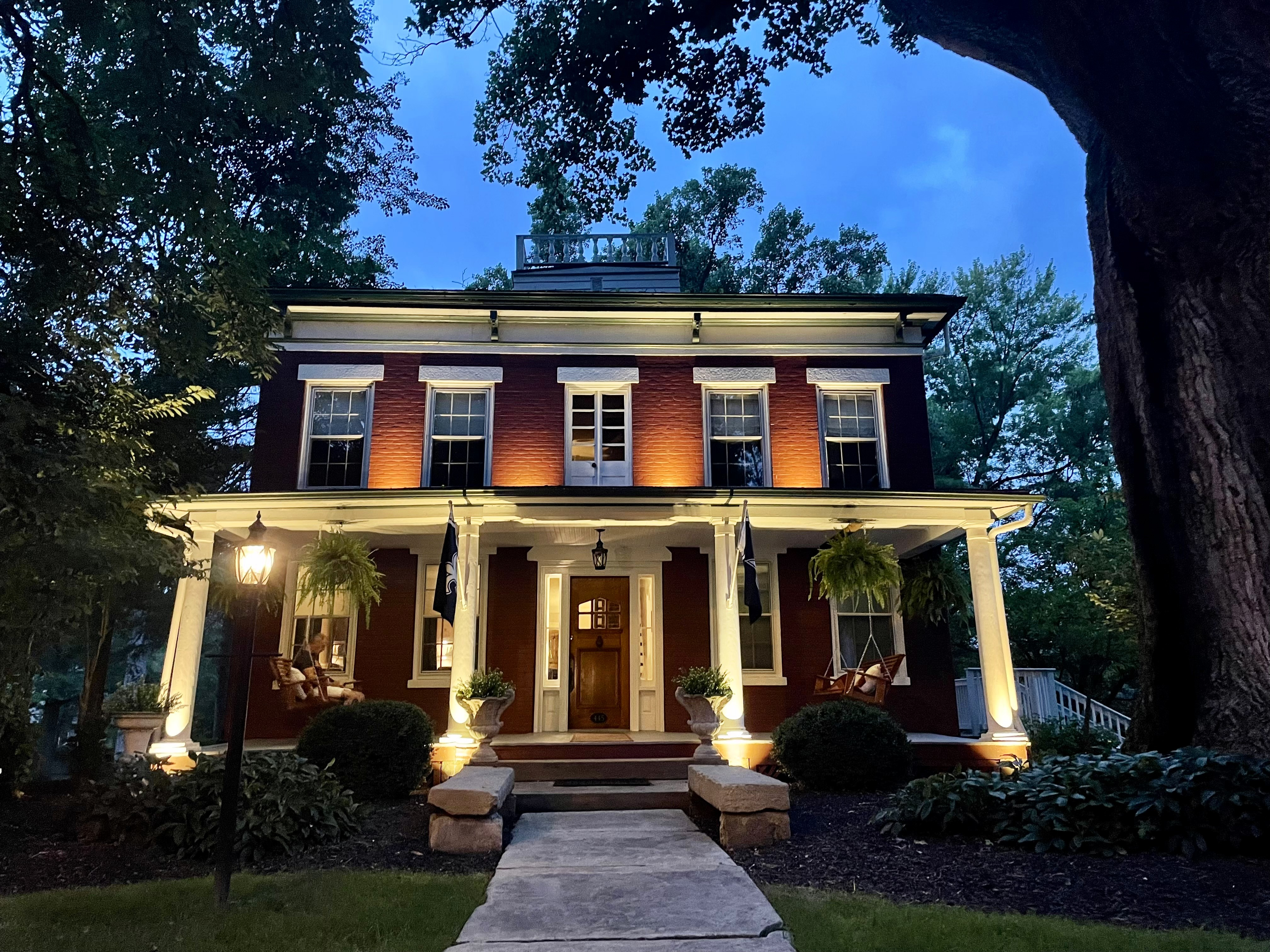
- John Wheeler House
- Location: Berea, Ohio
- Coordinates: 41°21′29.15″N 81°50′52.11″W
- Area: 1.4 acres (0.57 ha)
- Built: 1834
- Architectural style: Italianate
- NRHP reference No.: 78002034
- Added to NRHP: 1978

The John Wheeler House, was home to John Wheeler, an American educator and the first president of Baldwin University in Berea, Ohio. Baldwin College eventually merged with nearby German Wallace College to become Baldwin Wallace University. Wheeler also has a building named after him on the Baldwin Wallace University campus. Wheeler's home, built in 1834, is the oldest continuously occupied residence in Berea, Ohio.

The Berea Historical Society designated the John Wheeler House a century-old home. Its current owners have restored it yet retain its original character and charm. The home is a modern classic and will celebrate its bicentennial in 2034.

The Wheeler House is Italianate architecture and boasts original wood floors, crown moldings, windows, stained glass, two staircases, and hardware. The front porch, with dual swings, opens to the south lawn with its original stone walkway and two mounting blocks. Two expansive verandas also overlook the north, east, and west lawns.

The home comprises 3,654 square feet (339.5 m^{2}) of living space on three levels with a foyer, living room, formal dining room, kitchen, library, five bedrooms, three bathrooms, mud room, laundry room, and a home gym in the large, finished cellarage. The kitchen is a Clive Christian original and features two sinks, two islands, a table that faces a working fireplace, a bay window, and French doors that lead out to the back tree-shaded veranda.

The property sits on 1.4 acres (0.57 ha) of land and features some of the oldest trees in Cuyahoga County. At the end of the driveway is a carriage house that has been converted into a two-car garage and studio with a brick patio that overlooks a ravine, creek, and waterfall. The home and grounds are surrounded to the north and south by Mill Stream Run Reservation, part of the Cleveland Metroparks system.

The John Wheeler House was added to the U.S. National Register of Historic Places in 1978. Its current owners, Dr. Scott J. Latiolais and Joel M. Latiolais, acquired the home in 2022.

== Gallery ==
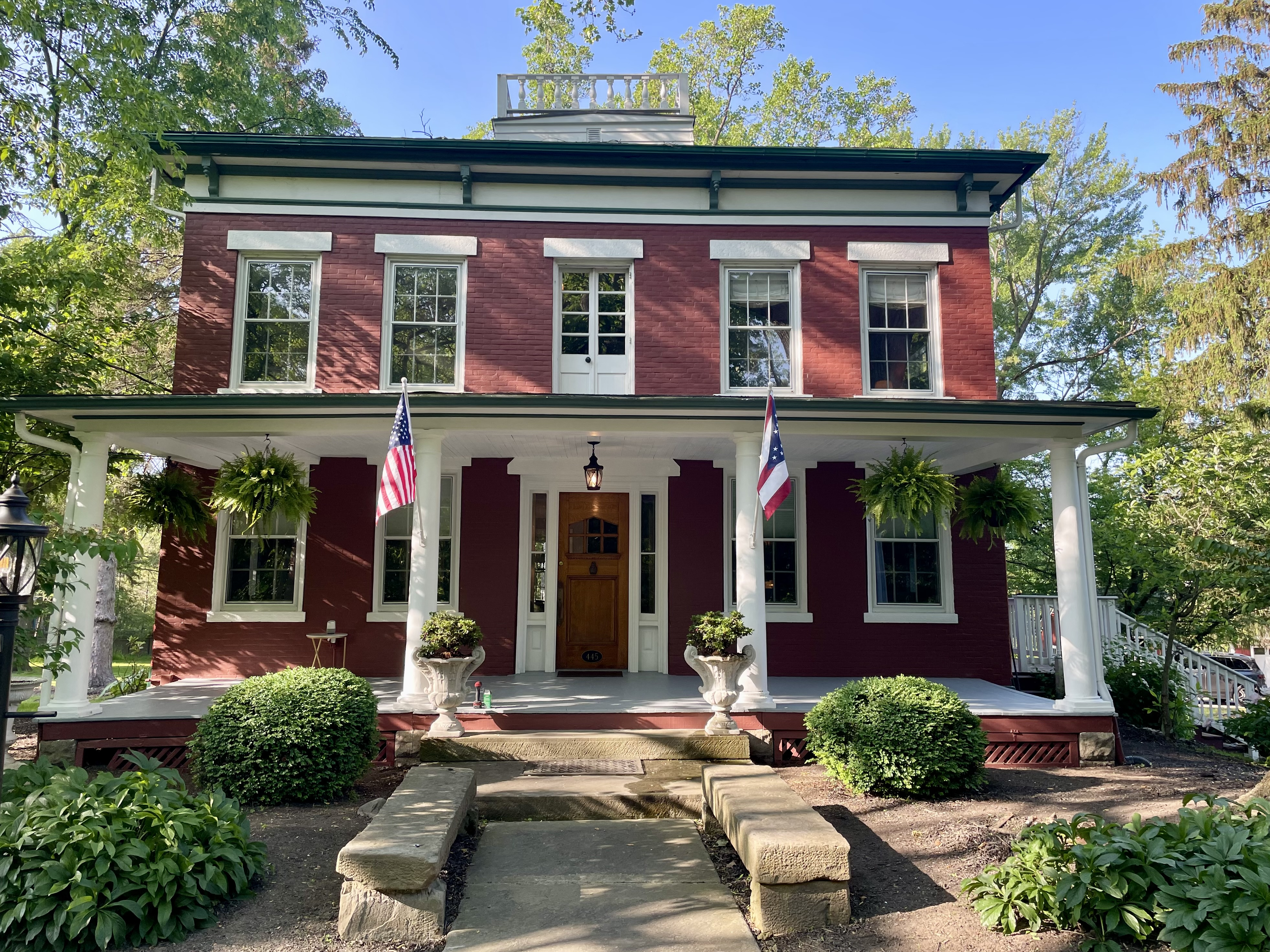
South View

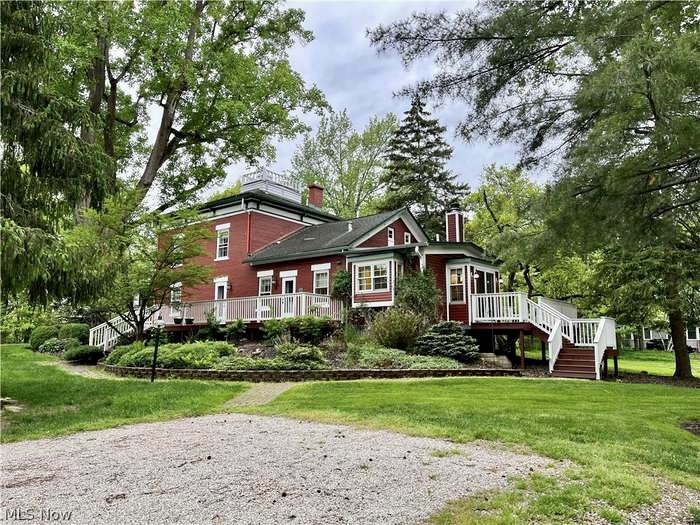
North View

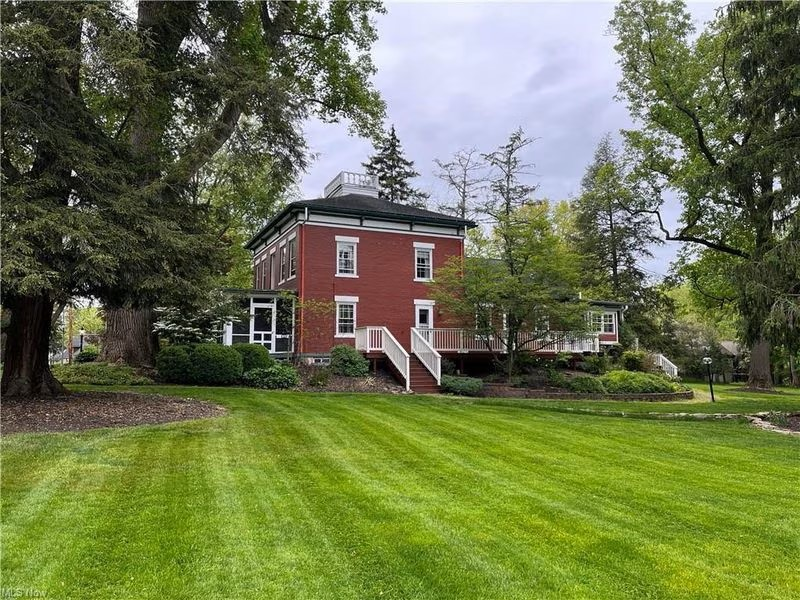
East View
