= William Kerslake =

- William R. Kerslake in 1996

Personal information
- Full name: William Roy Kerslake
- Born: December 27, 1929 Euclid, Ohio, U.S.
- Died: September 29, 2015 (aged 85) Middleburg Heights, Ohio, U.S.

Sport
- Country: United States
- Sport: Wrestling
- Events: Freestyle, Greco-Roman, and Folkstyle
- College team: Case Institute of Technology
- Team: USA

William "Bill" Roy Kerslake (December 27, 1929 – September 29, 2015) was an American Olympic heavy weight wrestler and retired NASA engineer.

During his collegiate years at Case Institute of Technology, known today as Case Western Reserve University, he was a three sport varsity athlete in wrestling, football, and track. In 1951, he was voted Case Institute of Technology's "outstanding athlete." Kerslake was a member of Sigma Alpha Epsilon fraternity.

Kerslake wrestling US Navy's Hallow "Rough House" Wilson in the 1950s.

Kerslake won 15 consecutive national championships in Freestyle and Greco-Roman. He won a gold medal in the 1955 Pan American Games and represented the United States three times in the Olympic Games, placing fifth, eighth and seventh from 1952 through 1960. At the 1956 National Amateur Athletic Union (AAU) Greco-Roman Championship in Tulsa, Oklahoma, Kerslake achieved a record setting fastest pin, taking only 4 seconds to pin his heavy weight opponent Ralph Bartleman. This feat was captured in the 1986 Guinness Book of World Records in the sports section under “Fastest Pin in National Tournament Competition”.

Throughout his wrestling career, and afterward, he was an aerospace research engineer for NASA. He was the co-inventor of the first ion thruster for space propulsion and served as chairman of the technical committee of the AIAA.

In 1982, Kerslake was inducted into the National Wrestling Hall of Fame as a Distinguished Member.
