= Auguste Baarendse =

Belgian wrestler

Personal information
- Nationality: Belgian
- Born: 15 September 1931 Antwerp, Belgium

Sport
- Sport: Wrestling

Auguste Baarendse (born 15 September 1931) is a Belgian wrestler. He competed in the men's freestyle heavyweight at the 1952 Summer Olympics.
