= Arsen Mekokishvili =

Georgian wrestler (1912–1972)

Personal information
- Born: 12 April 1912 Georgitsminda, Sagarejo Municipality, Georgia, Russian Empire
- Died: 9 March 1972 (aged 59) Moscow, Russian SFSR, Soviet Union

Sport
- Sport: Freestyle wrestling
- Club: Dynamo Tbilisi
Medal record
Representing the Soviet Union
Olympic Games
Gold medal – first place	1952 Helsinki	+87 kg
World Championships
Gold medal – first place	1954 Tokyo	+87 kg

Arsen Mekokishvili (Georgian: არსენ მეკოკიშვილი; 12 April 1912 – 9 March 1972) was a Georgian heavyweight freestyle wrestler. He won an Olympic gold medal in 1952 and a world title in 1954.

Mekokishvili took up wrestling following his father, a local champion in chidaoba, and in 1934 won the Georgian chidaoba championship. Later around 1939 he changed to sambo and freestyle wrestling, and won the Soviet titles in sambo in 1940 and 1947–52 and in freestyle wrestling in 1945–46, 1948–53 and 1956. Between 1945 and 1954, he lost only one bout, to Johannes Kotkas. After retiring from competition, Mekokishvili worked as a wrestling coach in Georgia. He died in Moscow as a result of a car accident.
