= Old District 10 Schoolhouse =

- U.S. National Register of Historic Places
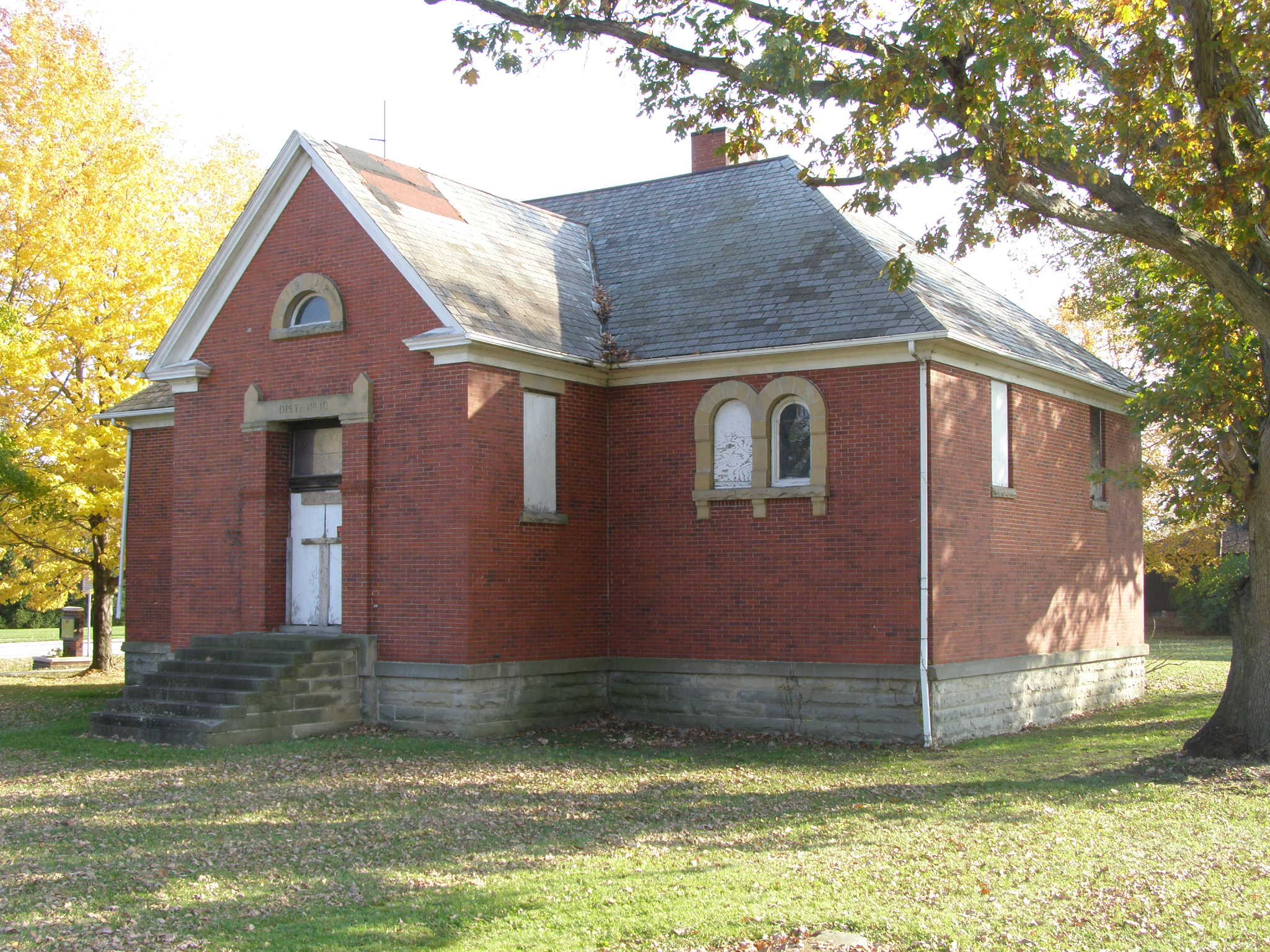
- The former schoolhouse in 2006.

- Location within Ohio Location within the United States
- Location: Corner of Sheldon and Fry Roads; Middleburg Heights, Ohio
- Coordinates: 41°23′18″N 81°48′54″W
- Area: 1.5 acres (0.61 ha)
- Built: 1912
- NRHP reference No.: 73001427
- Added to NRHP: October 15, 1973

Old District 10 Schoolhouse, sometimes referred to as the Little Red Schoolhouse, is a 5-room former schoolhouse located in Middleburg Heights, Ohio. Built in 1912, the building was the site of Middleburg's first city hall, as well as a speakeasy during Prohibition and a railroad way station. It was then bought by Harvey Cross in 1940 and was used as his private home until his death in 1970.

Sitting vacant since then, the former schoolhouse has since deteriorated to the point of being listed on Preservation Ohio's list of most endangered historic sites in 2015.

In September 2015, the Middleburg Heights Historical Society signed an option to buy the schoolhouse, intending to make the building a museum and cultural center.
