= John Guzik (defensive lineman) =

American football player (born 1962)

No. 97
- Position: Nose tackle / Defensive end

Personal information
- Born: September 25, 1962 (age 64); Cleveland, Ohio, U.S.
- Listed height: 6 ft 4 in (1.93 m)
- Listed weight: 270 lb (122 kg)

Career information
- High school: Midpark (Middleburg Heights, Ohio)
- College: Ohio (1982–1985)
- NFL draft: 1986: undrafted

Career history
- Washington Redskins (1986)*; New England Patriots (1987)
- * Offseason or practice squad member only
- Stats at Pro Football Reference

John Joseph Guzik III (born September 25, 1962) is an American former professional football defensive lineman who played one season with the New England Patriots of the National Football League (NFL). He played college football at Ohio University.

== Early life and college ==
John Joseph Guzik III was born on September 25, 1962, in Cleveland, Ohio. He attended Midpark High School in Middleburg Heights, Ohio.

He lettered for the Ohio Bobcats from 1982 to 1985.

== Professional career ==
Guzik signed with the Washington Redskins after going undrafted in the 1986 NFL draft. He was released by the Redskins on August 19, 1986. He was later re-signed by the team on May 8, 1987. Guzik was released again on August 4, 1987.

On September 23, 1987, Guzik was signed by the New England Patriots during the 1987 NFL players strike. He played in three games, starting two, for the Patriots as a nose tackle/defensive end before the strike ended. He was released by the Patriots on October 19, 1987.
