= Natale Vecchi =

Italian wrestler

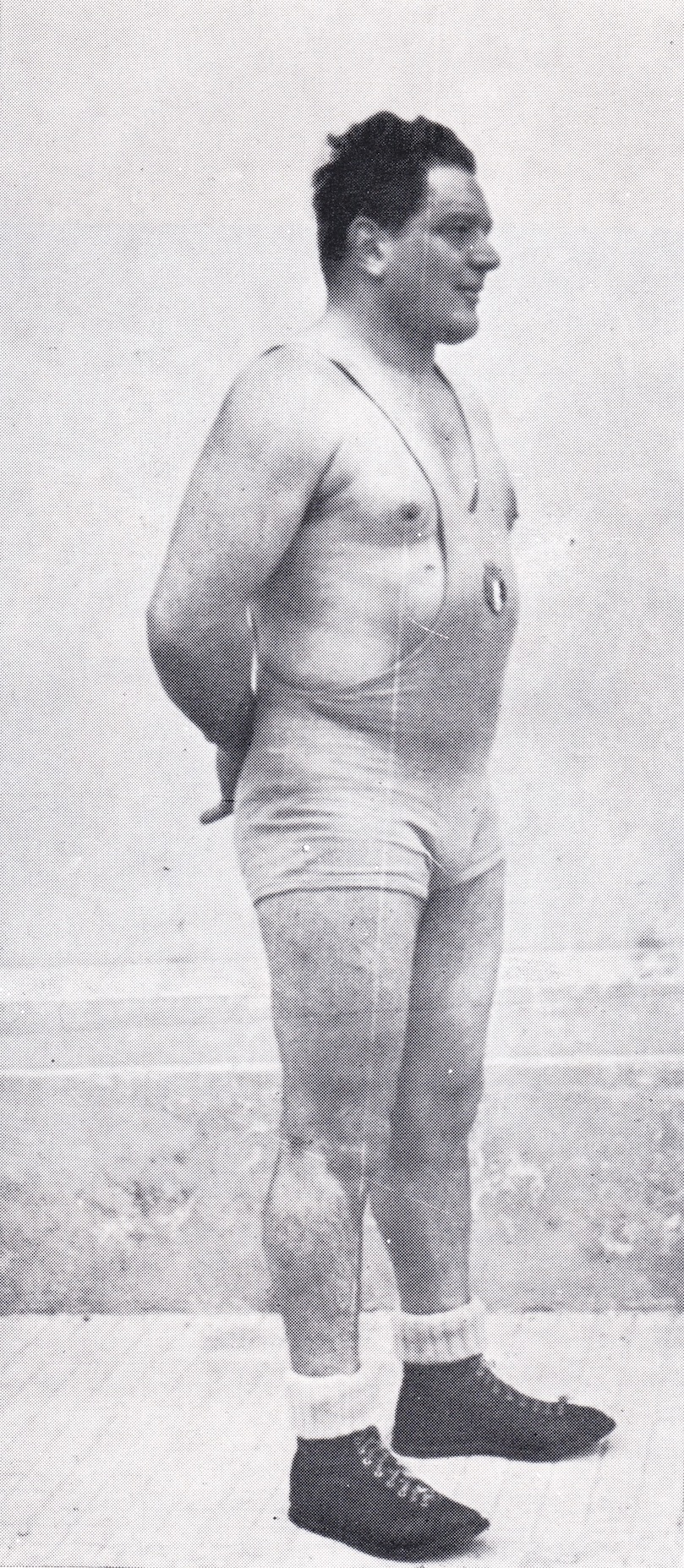

Personal information
- Nationality: Italian
- Born: 29 June 1917 Novellara, Italy
- Died: 4 December 1988 (aged 71)

Sport
- Sport: Wrestling

Natale Vecchi (29 June 1917 – 4 December 1988) was an Italian wrestler. He competed in the men's freestyle heavyweight at the 1952 Summer Olympics.
