= Antonios Georgoulis =

Greek wrestler

Personal information
- Nationality: Greek
- Born: 25 March 1928

Sport
- Sport: Wrestling

Antonios Georgoulis (Greek: Αντώνιος Γεωργούλης, born 25 March 1928) was a Greek wrestler. He competed at the 1952 Summer Olympics and the 1956 Summer Olympics.
