= Brian Poindexter =

American politician (born 1979)

- Poindexter in 2026

Member-elect of the U.S. House of Representatives from Ohio's 7th district
- Assuming office January 3, 2027
- Succeeding: Max Miller

Member of Brook Park City Council from the At-Large district
- Incumbent
- Assumed office January 2018

Personal details
- Born: Brian Keith Poindexter; August 4, 1979 (age 47) Cleveland, Ohio, U.S.
- Party: Democratic
- Children: 3
- Education: Cuyahoga Community College (AS)
- Website: Campaign website

Brian Keith Poindexter (born August 4, 1979) is an American politician who is the member-elect to the United States House of Representatives for Ohio's 7th congressional district. A member of the Democratic Party, he has served as a city councilmember in Brook Park since 2018.

== Early life and career ==
Poindexter was born on August 4, 1979, in Cleveland, Ohio. His father Bob was a union machinist, while his mother stayed at home. He has five siblings. His grandfather was an autoworker. In high school, Poindexter played on the school football, baseball and wrestling teams as well as working at a machine shop. During his teenage years, he accrued several misdemeanor charges for public intoxication, speeding and assault, the latter of which being the result of an incident where he and his friends had a fight with "some other dudes" at a beach in Cleveland. As an adult; Poindexter, a Browns fan, got into a fight with a Steelers fan after a game and was subsequently arrested. In 1998, he was arrested once more on suspicion of possessing crack cocaine, although he was never charged.

After graduating high school, Poindexter obtained a Class A commercial driver's license and began working in the moving industry, where he travelled across the whole of the continental United States. In 2007, he joined the International Association of Bridge, Structural, Ornamental and Reinforcing Iron Workers and began an apprenticeship in ironworking while completing an associate degree in applied industrial technology at Cuyahoga Community College. Poindexter has stated that he formerly supported Republican candidates for president, but his political views evolved as a result of his union work.

From 2012 to 2014, Poindexter served as a union organizer. In 2014, he re-entered the workforce as an ironworker and worked on several projects over the next few years including The Lumen and NASA Glenn Research Center. He was an apprentice instructor at Ironworks Local 17 until May 2026.

Poindexter was elected to the at-large district of the city council of Brook Park, Ohio in 2017 and he began his term in January 2018. He was re-elected for five terms and his final term will end in January 2027.

== U.S. House of Representatives ==
=== Election - 2026 7th District OH ===
In January 2026, Poindexter announced his candidacy for the Democratic Party nomination for the U.S. House of Representatives for Ohio's 7th congressional district. He won the nomination in the primary election in May with 37% of the vote, while second-place finisher Ed FitzGerald, former Cuyahoga county executive, earned 22%. Poindexter won all four counties (Cuyahoga, Medina, Wayne, and Ashland) in the primary.

Despite the political climate favoring Democrats, the Cook Political Report initially rated the general election safely Republican, meaning it heavily favored Max Miller. Following series of abuse scandals against Miller, Cook shifted their forecast towards Poindexter; the race was rated a tossup by the end of the summer.

Miller was accused of serious physical abuse of his ex-wife Emily Moreno and their 2-year-old daughter. Miller's father-in-law Bernie Moreno, who represented Ohio in the U.S. Senate, was among those calling for Miller to drop out. Bernie Moreno stated that Miller had exhibited "increasingly erratic and dangerous behavior" and needed "serious psychological help." Miller defied calls to drop out before the deadline, which would have allowed the RNC to replace him with another candidate on the November ballot. Miller attempted to have the House Ethics Committee produce a report to clear his name but was unable as the committee does not conduct partisan reports less then 60 days before an election.

Poindexter capitalized on these scandals with a series of ads. One of these ads included a sheriff discussing how she had dealt with domestic abusers, comparing them to Miller. Poindexter soon surpassed Miller in fundraising. Poindexter also began to spotlight his three daughters in his campaign in an attempt to contrast his behavior with that of Miller's.

Poindexter defeated Miller by a margin of 55% to 45%, winning roughly 181,000 votes to Miller's 148,000. Poindexter won heavily in the large Cuyahoga County, including Parma Ohio. Miller won narrowly in the more suburban County of Medina, and heavily in the rural agricultural Wayne and Ashland Counties.

In November 2026, after being elected to Congress, Poindexter was informed that he was under investigation by the Democratic Congressional Campaign Committee (DCCC) for sexual harassment. Poindexter's campaign spokesperson claimed "Brian gave what he thought was an innocuous compliment to a volunteer. He heard later that it made her feel uncomfortable and he felt awful."

== Political positions ==
Poindexter has cited Jamie Raskin, Bernie Sanders, and James Talarico as his influences. Poindexter has rejected the label of "socialist", instead stating "I'm a capitalist ... I want to capitalize on my labor".

Poindexter does not accept corporate PAC money, although he does accept political PAC money. Poindexter was endorsed by the AFL-CIO, Planned Parenthood, Congressional Progressive Caucus, and Blue Dog Democrats in 2026.

On election day the DCCC and Blue Dog Democrats suddenly pulled their endorsements later explaining it was due to an allegation of sexual harassment. The allegation is currently being investigated by the DCCC.

== Personal life ==
Poindexter lives in his hometown of Brook Park in Cuyahoga County.

Poindexter and his ex-wife have three daughters together.

U.S. House of Representatives
| Preceded by Max Miller | Member of the U.S. House of Representatives from Ohio's 2nd congressional district Taking office 2027 | Elect |
