= Berea, Ohio =

- City
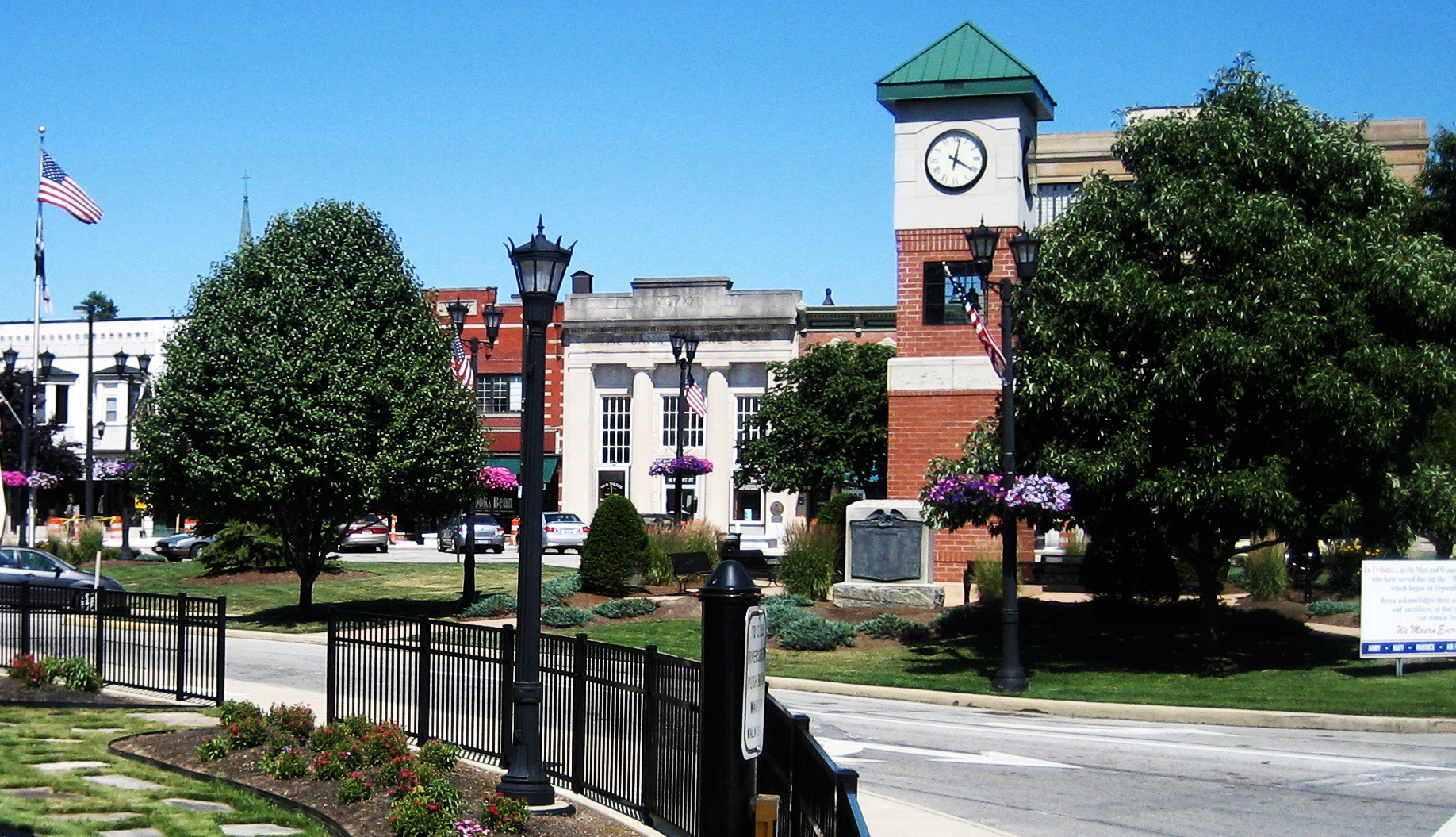
- Triangle area of downtown Berea
- Interactive map of Berea, Ohio
- Location within Ohio Location within the United States
- Coordinates: 41°22′32″N 81°51′55″W
- Country: United States
- State: Ohio
- County: Cuyahoga
- Established: 1836; 190 years ago

Government
  - Mayor: Cyril M. Kleem (R)

Area
  - Total: 5.80 sq mi (15.01 km^{2})
  - Land: 5.68 sq mi (14.71 km^{2})
  - Water: 0.11 sq mi (0.29 km^{2})
- Elevation: 787 ft (240 m)

Population (2020)
  - Total: 18,545
  - Estimate (2023): 17,922
  - Density: 3,264.7/sq mi (1,260.52/km^{2})
- Time zone: UTC-5 (Eastern (EST))
  - Summer (DST): UTC-4 (EDT)
- ZIP code: 44017
- Area code: 440
- FIPS code: 39-05690
- GNIS feature ID: 1085954
- Website: https://www.cityofberea.org/

Berea (/bəˈriːə/ bə-REE-ə) is a city in Cuyahoga County, Ohio, United States. Its population was 18,545 at the 2020 census. A western suburb of Cleveland, it is a part of the Cleveland metropolitan area. Berea is home to Baldwin Wallace University, the training facility for the Cleveland Browns, and the Cuyahoga County Fairgrounds.

== History ==
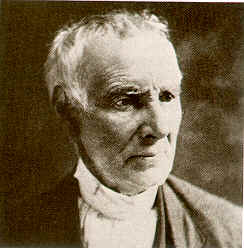
John Baldwin named Berea and produced the grindstones that made the town famous.

Berea was established in 1836. The first European settlers were originally from Connecticut. Berea fell within Connecticut's Western Reserve and was surveyed and divided into townships and ranges by Gideon Granger, who served as postmaster general under President Thomas Jefferson. Abram Hickox, a Revolutionary War veteran, bought the first plot in what is today Middleburg Heights and in 1808 traveled west from Connecticut to his new purchase. Dissuaded by the swampy and heavily forested land, he decided to settle in Cleveland. He became successful as Cleveland's first full-time blacksmith. His plot of land was sold to his nephew, Jared Hickox, who came to the area with his wife Sarah and family in 1809. They followed an ancient Indian highway down through the forest from Cleveland and then, at what is now the corner of Bagley and Pearl roads, began to hack their way directly west. About two miles (3.2 km) in, they found Granger's plot markers and set up their homestead. Today, this area is a strip mall on Bagley Road, just down the road from Berea. At the time Hickox discovered Granger's plot markers, the area was a swampy lowland, and as fate would have it, the Hickox's two grown sons died from typhoid fever shortly after the family's arrival. The family farm was in dire straits, having been so severely depleted of male laborers. Love came to the rescue, however, and the area's spirits were lifted by its first marriage, that of Jared's daughter Amy Hickox to a recent arrival, Abijah Bagley. Bagley ended up taking over the farm and managing it into a successful concern. Today, Berea's largest street bears his name.

In 1827, educator John Baldwin moved to Middleburg Township, where he joined forces with James Gilruth and Henry Olcott Sheldon, Methodist circuit preachers, who wanted to form an ideal Christian community. In 1836, they pledged to pool all their properties to create a Utopian "Community of United Christians." Members of the community vowed to avoid all luxuries and temptations that would prevent them from achieving the Methodist ideal of "sanctification" or perfect love of God. In 1836, Baldwin and the others of the Utopian community tried to think of a name for their new town. Nehemiah Brown proposed Tabor (perhaps from the biblical Mount Tabor), but Henry Sheldon suggested Berea, citing the biblical Berea in the Acts 17:10–11. They decided to let God decide the community's place name by flipping a coin, and the coin came up Berea. Financial disputes led to the dissolution of the community and the departure of James Gilruth within a year. John Baldwin and Henry Sheldon then teamed up with Josiah Holbrook, the founder of the American Lyceum movement for adult and community education, to found the Berea Seminary, a central instructional facility for Lyceum teachers, and a Lyceum village composed of community members dedicated to creation of an educated population. The Lyceum village concept never caught on in Berea due to the 1838 Public School Act, but the idea of an ideal community centered around a school continued even after the Berea Seminary closed.

The failure of these two Utopian experiments left John Baldwin and Henry Sheldon in deep debt. However, Baldwin since 1838 had been making grindstones from sandstone in the creek bed of the Rocky River. In the 1840s, Henry Sheldon began selling them via the Erie Canal in New York. This was the beginning of the Berea quarrying industry. After the Big Four Railroad was built from Cleveland to Cincinnati, Baldwin built a railroad to connect his quarries to the Big Four Depot.

In 1845, Baldwin convinced the North Ohio Conference of the Methodist Church to charter a new school, a new Utopian venture of sorts, because the new school, the Baldwin Institute, would provide education to all, regardless of sex, race, religious creed, or ability to pay. In 1855, it was renamed Baldwin University. By the 1880s, the quarries had begun to intrude on the site of the university. In 1891, the school broke ground for a new campus at Front Street and Bagley Road. New buildings were constructed and old buildings were moved. In 1866, James Wallace purchased the site of the Lyceum village from the German Children's Home to become the German Wallace College Campus. In 1913, Baldwin University and German-Wallace College merged to become Baldwin–Wallace College, now Baldwin Wallace University. Berea High School was the town's first high school, founded in 1882 and closed in 2020. The current Berea–Midpark High School opened in 2020.

=== Berea sandstone ===
Welcome sign featuring grindstone

The geological stratum on which the city rests is the sedimentary formation Berea sandstone, a geological formation named after the city, which extends across Ohio, western Pennsylvania, and northern Kentucky. This comprises a sandstone laid down during the early Mississippian. In the 19th and early 20th centuries, this formation was extensively quarried, with the quarries eventually displacing the original main street of the town, as well as the original location of Baldwin University, which sold its five-acre campus to the quarries for $100,000 in 1888, moving to a new location to the north.

After beginning of quarrying of the Berea sandstone in the 1830s, Baldwin initially shipped grindstones to Cleveland by ox carts, and later the quarries were connected to the railroad by a spur line. Berea proclaims itself the "Grindstone Capital of the World". The town's symbol is a grindstone, a tribute to the many grindstones that came out of its quarries.

The quarries also provided sandstone that was extensively used as a construction material, in the form of Berea dimension stone. Huge amounts of it came from Berea and were used architecturally in many important buildings. (Note: Nearby Amherst, Ohio, claimed to be the "Sandstone Center of the World".) The quarries closed in the late 1930s, when concrete came into wide use for construction. Several lakes in the area are former quarry pits that have been allowed to fill with water, including Baldwin, Wallace, and Coe Lakes.

=== National Register of Historic Places ===
- Baldwin-Wallace College North Campus Historic District
- Baldwin-Wallace College South Campus Historic District
- Berea District 7 School
- Berea Union Depot
- Buehl House
- Lyceum Village Square And German Wallace College
- John Wheeler House
- George W. Whitney House

== Geography ==
Berea is located south/southwest of Brook Park, west of Middleburg Heights, and east of Olmsted Falls.

According to the 2010 census, the city has a total area of 5.83 square miles (15.1 km^{2}), of which 0.11 square miles (0.28 km^{2}) (or 1.89%) is covered by water.

The east branch of the Rocky River runs through Berea, providing its water supply for most of the year. The Cleveland Metroparks' Rocky River and Mill Stream Run reservations run through the city.

== Demographics ==
Historical population
| Census | Pop. | Note | %± |
|---|---|---|---|
| 1870 | 1,628 | | — |
| 1880 | 1,682 | | 3.3% |
| 1890 | 2,533 | | 50.6% |
| 1900 | 2,510 | | −0.9% |
| 1910 | 2,609 | | 3.9% |
| 1920 | 2,959 | | 13.4% |
| 1930 | 5,697 | | 92.5% |
| 1940 | 6,025 | | 5.8% |
| 1950 | 12,051 | | 100.0% |
| 1960 | 16,592 | | 37.7% |
| 1970 | 22,396 | | 35.0% |
| 1980 | 19,636 | | −12.3% |
| 1990 | 19,051 | | −3.0% |
| 2000 | 18,970 | | −0.4% |
| 2010 | 19,093 | | 0.6% |
| 2020 | 18,545 | | −2.9% |
| 2023 (est.) | 17,922 | | −3.4% |
U.S. Decennial Census

=== Racial and ethnic composition ===
Berea city, Ohio – Racial and ethnic composition Note: the US Census treats Hispanic/Latino as an ethnic category. This table excludes Latinos from the racial categories and assigns them to a separate category. Hispanics/Latinos may be of any race.
| Race / Ethnicity (NH = Non-Hispanic) | Pop 2000 | Pop 2010 | Pop 2020 | % 2000 | % 2010 | % 2020 |
|---|---|---|---|---|---|---|
| White alone (NH) | 17,175 | 16,619 | 15,258 | 90.54% | 87.04% | 82.28% |
| Black or African American alone (NH) | 965 | 1,226 | 1,210 | 5.09% | 6.42% | 6.52% |
| Native American or Alaska Native alone (NH) | 45 | 32 | 32 | 0.24% | 0.17% | 0.17% |
| Asian alone (NH) | 169 | 288 | 406 | 0.89% | 1.51% | 2.19% |
| Native Hawaiian or Pacific Islander alone (NH) | 6 | 3 | 5 | 0.03% | 0.02% | 0.03% |
| Other race alone (NH) | 32 | 21 | 51 | 0.17% | 0.11% | 0.28% |
| Multiracial (NH) | 277 | 370 | 841 | 1.46% | 1.94% | 4.53% |
| Hispanic or Latino (any race) | 301 | 534 | 742 | 1.59% | 2.80% | 4.00% |
| Total | 18,970 | 19,093 | 18,545 | 100.00% | 100.00% | 100.00% |

=== 2020 census ===
As of the 2020 census, Berea had a population of 18,545. The median age was 40.1 years. 16.5% of residents were under the age of 18 and 19.6% of residents were 65 years of age or older. For every 100 females there were 93.0 males, and for every 100 females age 18 and over there were 90.3 males age 18 and over.

100.0% of residents lived in urban areas, while 0% lived in rural areas.

There were 7,731 households in Berea, of which 22.8% had children under the age of 18 living in them. Of all households, 40.5% were married-couple households, 20.9% were households with a male householder and no spouse or partner present, and 31.5% were households with a female householder and no spouse or partner present. About 36.1% of all households were made up of individuals and 15.1% had someone living alone who was 65 years of age or older.

There were 8,174 housing units, of which 5.4% were vacant. Among occupied housing units, 70.6% were owner-occupied and 29.4% were renter-occupied. The homeowner vacancy rate was 0.7% and the rental vacancy rate was 7.1%.

Racial composition as of the 2020 census
| Race | Number | Percent |
|---|---|---|
| White | 15,482 | 83.5% |
| Black or African American | 1,257 | 6.8% |
| American Indian and Alaska Native | 42 | 0.2% |
| Asian | 412 | 2.2% |
| Native Hawaiian and Other Pacific Islander | 7 | <0.1% |
| Some other race | 191 | 1.0% |
| Two or more races | 1,154 | 6.2% |
| Hispanic or Latino (of any race) | 742 | 4.0% |

=== 2010 census ===
As of the 2010 census, 19,093 people, 7,471 households, and 4,390 families resided in the city. The population density was 3,337.9 inhabitants per square mile (1,288.8/km^{2}). The 7,958 housing units had an average density of 1,391.3 per square mile (537.2/km^{2}). The racial makeup of the city was 88.8% White, 6.6% African American, 0.2% Native American, 1.5% Asian, 0.6% from other races, and 2.3% from two or more races. Hispanics or Latinos of any race were 2.8% of the population.

Of the 7,471 households, 25.6% had children under 18 living with them, 43.7% were married couples living together, 11.4% had a female householder with no husband present, 3.7% had a male householder with no wife present, and 41.2% were not families. About 33.9% of all households were made up of individuals, and 11.5% had someone living alone who was 65 or older. The average household size was 2.26 and the average family size was 2.90.

The median age in the city was 37.1 years. The age distribution was 18.3% under 18, 17.8% from 18 to 24, 22.9% from 25 to 44, 27.0% from 45 to 64, and 13.9% were 65 or older. The gender makeup of the city was 47.7% male and 52.3% female.

=== 2000 census ===
As of the 2000 census, 18,970 people, 7,173 households, and 4,468 families lived in the city. The population density was 3,475.9 inhabitants per square mile (1,342.1/km^{2}). The 7,449 housing units had an average density of 1,364.9 per square mile (527.0/km^{2}). The racial makeup of the city was 91.48% White, 5.13% African American, 0.24% Native American, 0.90% Asian, 0.03% Pacific Islander, 0.61% from other races, and 1.61% from two or more races. Hispanics or Latinos of any race were 1.59% of the population.

Of the 7,173 households, 34.9% had children under 18 living with them, 48.1% were married couples living together, 10.6% had a female householder with no husband present, and 37.7% were not families. About 32.3% of all households were made up of individuals, and 12.1% had someone living alone who was 65 or older. The average household size was 2.35 and the average family size was 3.00.

In the city, the age distribution was 21.5% under 18, 16.2% from 18 to 24, 26.3% from 25 to 44, 21.7% from 45 to 64, and 14.3% who were 65 or older. The median age was 36 years. For every 100 females, there were 90.4 males. For every 100 females 18 and over, there were 86.2 males.

The median income for a household in the city was $45,699 and for a family was $59,194. Males had a median income of $39,769 versus $29,078 for females. The per capita income for the city was $21,647. About 2.6% of families and 5.5% of the population were below the poverty line, including 4.1% of those under 18 and 7.8% of those 65 or over.

== Politics ==
Since 2023, Berea has been included in Ohio's 7th congressional district, represented by Republican Max Miller, who will be replaced by Brian Poindexter in 2027 as a result of the 2026 midterm elections.

== Culture ==
=== Bach festival ===
Baldwin Wallace College is the home of the Riemenschneider Bach Institute, a research institute devoted to J. S Bach. (Note: The Institute houses a collection of items unique to Bach and his circle; it also holds classic vocal recordings.)

The first collegiate Bach festival in America was founded in 1932 by music educator Albert Riemenschneider and his wife Selma. As Riemenschneider conceived it, the festival would rotate Bach's four major works – the Mass in B minor, the St. John Passion, the St. Matthew Passion, and the Christmas Oratorio – every four years in sequence. Since the inception of the festival, Baldwin Wallace students perform Bach works with faculty, as well as with international and local professionals.

== Education ==
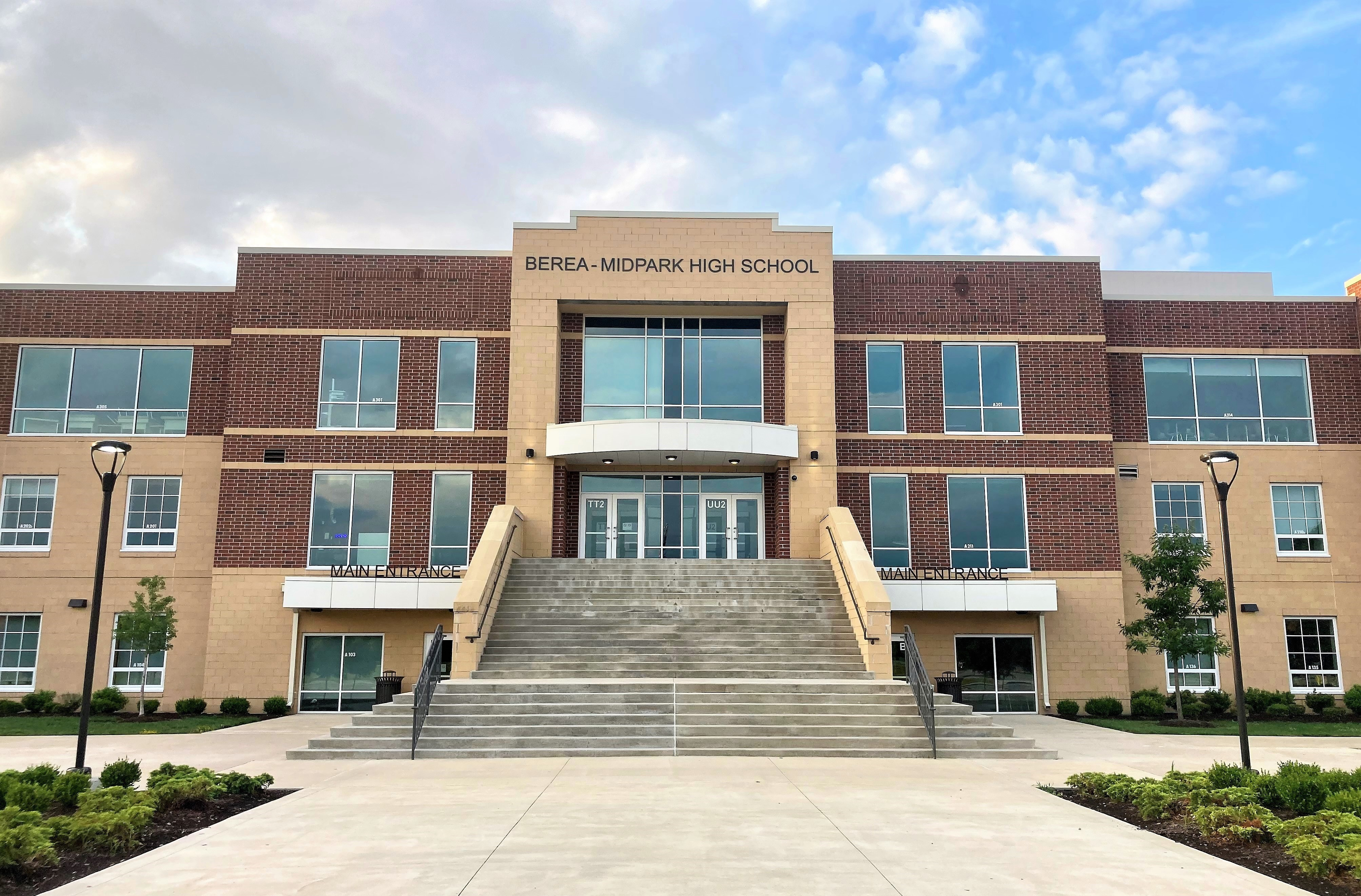
Berea–Midpark High School

The Berea City School District serves not just Berea, but also the neighboring cities of Brook Park and Middleburg Heights. Berea–Midpark High School is in Berea, and Berea-Midpark Middle School is in Middleburg Heights. The high school and middle school partners with Polaris Career Center for Project Lead The Way classes. The three elementary schools are Grindstone (in Berea), Brook Park (in Brook Park), and Big Creek (in Middleburg Heights).

== Notable people ==
- Jacob M. Appel (born 1973), novelist
- Albert E. Baesel (1890–1918), Medal of Honor recipient
- John Baldwin (1799–1884), founder of Berea and of Baldwin Institute
- Charles Bassett (1931–1966), NASA astronaut
- Tim Beckman (born 1965), former head football coach at the University of Illinois
- Mike Buddie (born 1970), MLB player for New York Yankees and Milwaukee Brewers
- Bud Collins (1929–2016), sportswriter and TV commentator
- Lou Groza (1924–2000), former placekicker and offensive tackle for Cleveland Browns
- Norb Hecker (1927–2004), football player and coach
- Geoffrey Landis (born 1955), award-winning science-fiction author and NASA scientist
- Nancy McArthur, children's author
- Neil H. McElroy (1904–1972), former U.S. Secretary of Defense
- Rob Mounsey (born 1952), composer, music producer and musician
- Hersha Parady (1945–2023), actress
- Jim Richter (born 1958), football player
- Tom Schmitz (born 1968), keyboardist for metal band Mushroomhead
- Herbert Schneider (1892–1984), philosopher
- Chris Scott, NFL player
- Theodore Stearns (1881–1935), composer, born in Berea
- Alex Stepanovich (born 1981), professional football player
- John-Michael Tebelak (1949–1985), wrote Broadway musical Godspell
- Christina Tosi (b. 1981), chef and cookbook author, founder and owner of Milk Bar
- Jim Tressel (born 1952), former president of Youngstown State University; former head football coach at Youngstown State University and Ohio State University
- Lee Tressel (1925–81), head football coach at Baldwin-Wallace University
- James Wallace (1821–85), quarry owner, former mayor of Berea

== Gallery ==
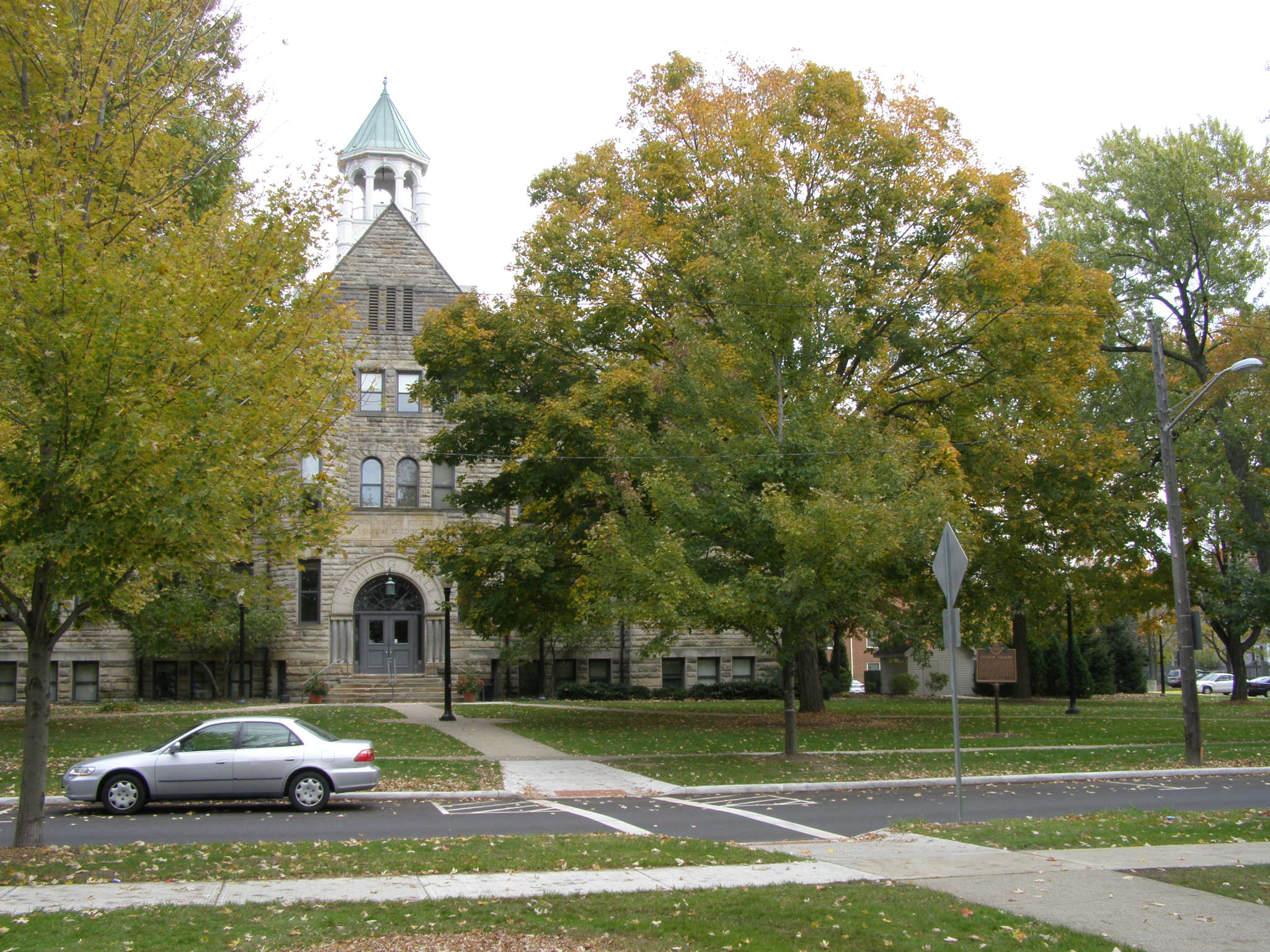
Lyceum Square, original site of the Lyceum Village and German Wallace College

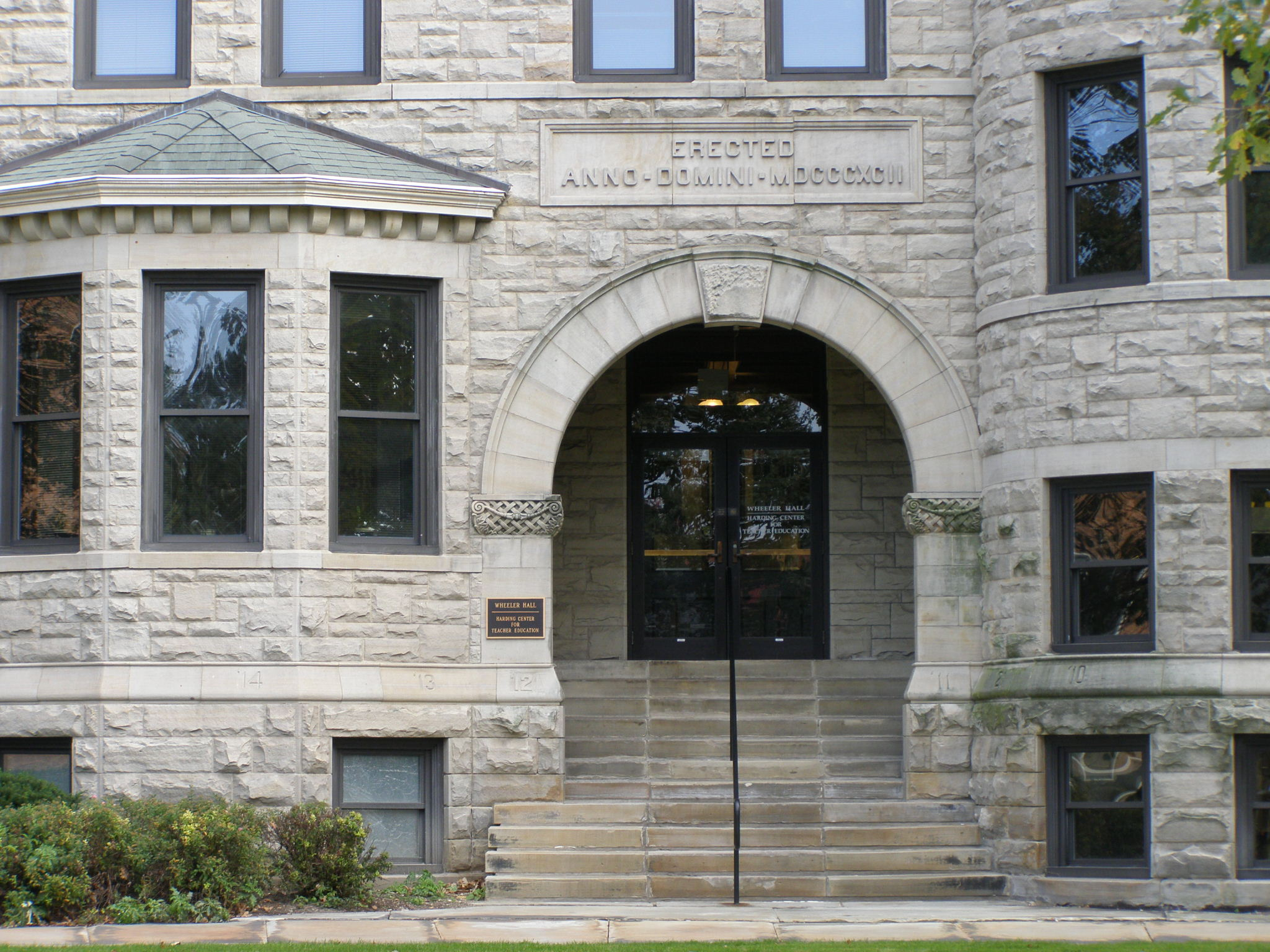
Recitation Hall, now Wheeler Hall was the 1st building on the new north campus.

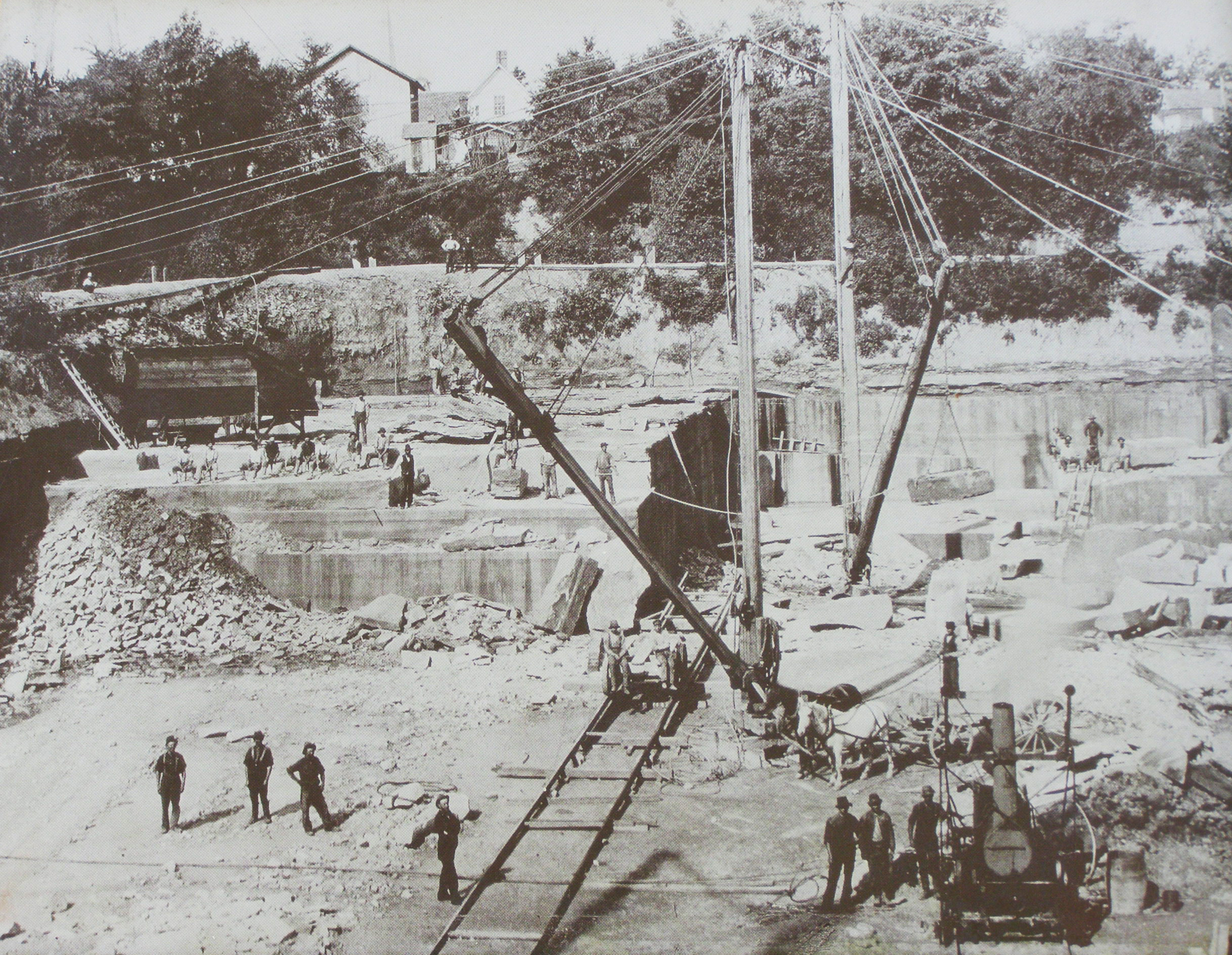
The Big Quarry at its busiest.

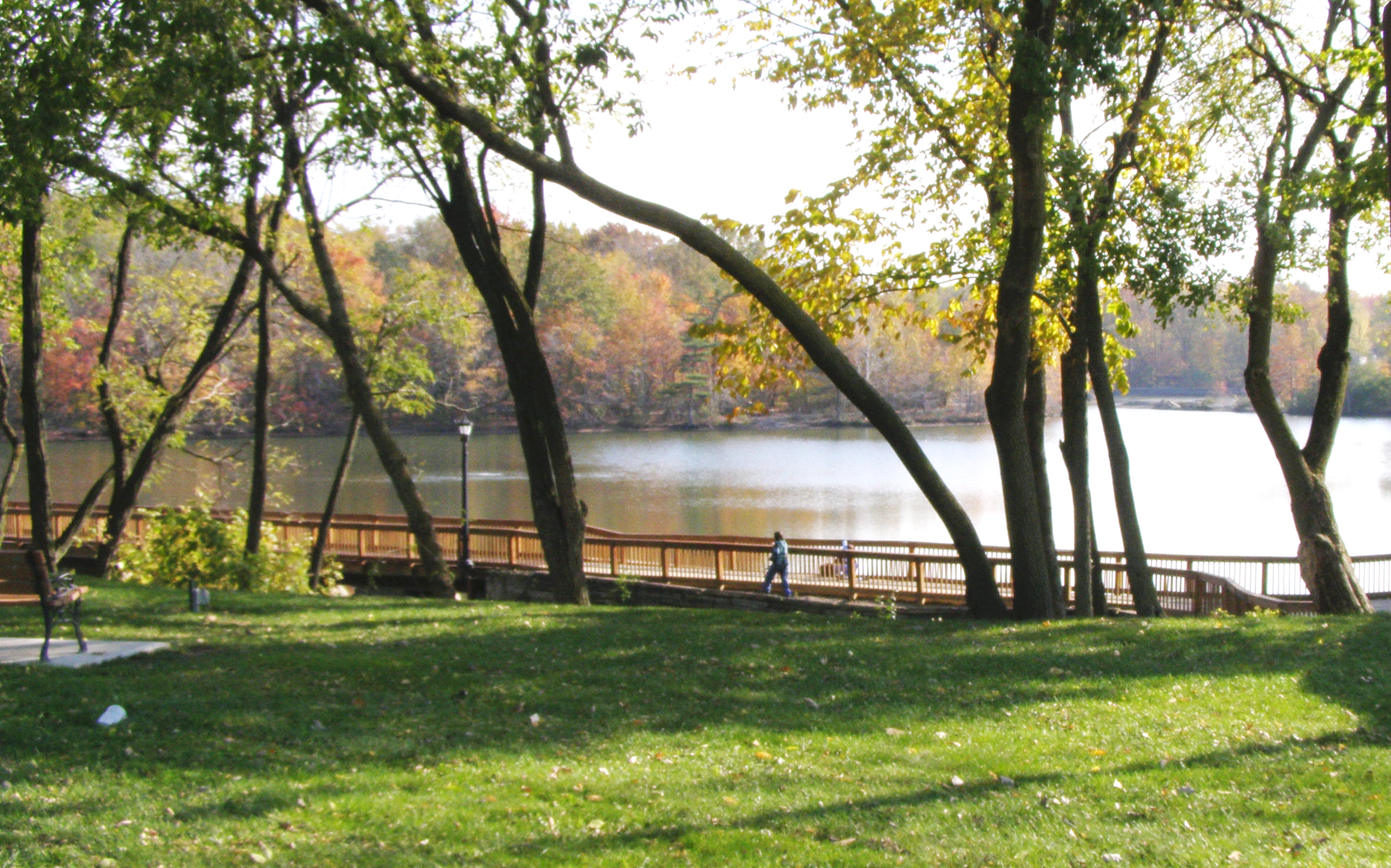
The Big Quarry was filled in after closing and is now Coe Lake, hosting a lakefront park.
