= Josef Růžička =

Czechoslovak wrestler (1925–1986)

Personal information
- Born: 17 March 1925 Prague, Czechoslovakia
- Died: 11 April 1986 (aged 61)
Medal record
Representing Czechoslovakia
Men's Greco-Roman wrestling
Olympic Games
Silver medal – second place	1952 Helsinki	Heavyweight

Josef Růžička (17 March 1925 – 11 April 1986) was a Czechoslovak wrestler. He was born in Prague. He won an Olympic silver medal in Greco-Roman wrestling in 1952. He died on 11 April 1986, at the age of 61.
