= Berea City School District =

School district in Ohio, United States

Address
- 390 Fair Street Berea, Ohio, 44017; United States

District information
- Type: Public
- Grades: PK–12
- Schools: 5
- NCES District ID: 3904360

Students and staff
- Students: 5,332 (2025–2026)
- Teachers: 290.35 (on an FTE basis) (2025–2026)
- Staff: 627.50 (on an FTE basis) (2025–2026)
- Student–teacher ratio: 18.36 (2025–2026)

Other information
- Website: www.berea.k12.oh.us

The Berea City School District is a public school district based in Berea, Ohio that serves Berea, Brook Park, and Middleburg Heights, as well as a portion of Olmsted Falls.

The district consists of one high school, one middle school, and three elementary schools.

== Berea–Midpark High School ==
- Berea–Midpark High School, which houses grades 9–12, was founded in 2013 as a result of the merger between Berea High School, founded in 1882, and Midpark High School, founded in 1962. It was initially housed at the former Berea High School building, the oldest part of which opened in 1929. A new Berea–Midpark High School was built on the same ground as the former Berea High School and opened in 2020, and the former BHS building was razed that year. The Berea-Midpark High School athletic teams go by the nickname Titans and compete in the Southwestern Conference.

== Berea–Midpark Middle School ==
Berea–Midpark Middle School was established in 2013 as part of the district's consolidation plan and houses students in grades five through eight. It is located in the building that opened in 1962 and until 2013 served as Midpark High School. From 2013 to 2018, it was known as Middleburg Heights Junior High School for grades seven through nine.

== Elementary schools ==
- Brook Park Elementary
- Big Creek
- Grindstone

== Closed buildings ==
- Lechner (closed 1977, now Saint Mary's Catholic School)
- Loomis (building sold to Baldwin Wallace College 1983)
- Eastpark (closed 1984?)
- Fairwood (demolished 2009)
- Smith (closed in 2011)
- Parknoll (demolished 2011)
- Riveredge (closed in 2011)
- Roehm Middle School (demolished in 2013)
- Ford Intermediate (demolished 2018)
- Brookview (closed in 2020)
- Brook Park Memorial (closed in 2020)

== Consolidations ==
Berea City Schools closed Parknoll, Smith, and Riveredge Elementary schools in 2011. Fairwood Elementary was demolished in 2009 to make way for a new elementary school, Grindstone Elementary. Fairwood's 850 students were transferred to Smith Elementary until the new 'combined' elementary school opened in 2011. Berea High School and Midpark High School were consolidated into one high school called Berea–Midpark High School for the 2013–2014 school year. The former Midpark High School was renamed the Middleburg Heights Junior High and housed the district's seventh to ninth graders until 2018. Ford Intermediate School, formerly Ford Middle School, included fifth and sixth graders until 2018. Roehm Middle School in Berea closed at the end of the 2012–2013 school year and was demolished. The property was converted to the district's athletic complex.

== Music education ==
As of 2012, the Berea City School District has been ranked as one of the "Best Communities for Music Education" in the United States 12 consecutive times.

== Finances ==
As of October 2025, the district is reported to have a revenue of approximately $85 million, and expenditures of $87 million.In recent years, and as reported in their 5 year financial forecast released in 2025, expenditure growth is expected to outpace revenue change.
