= Brook Park, Ohio =

- City
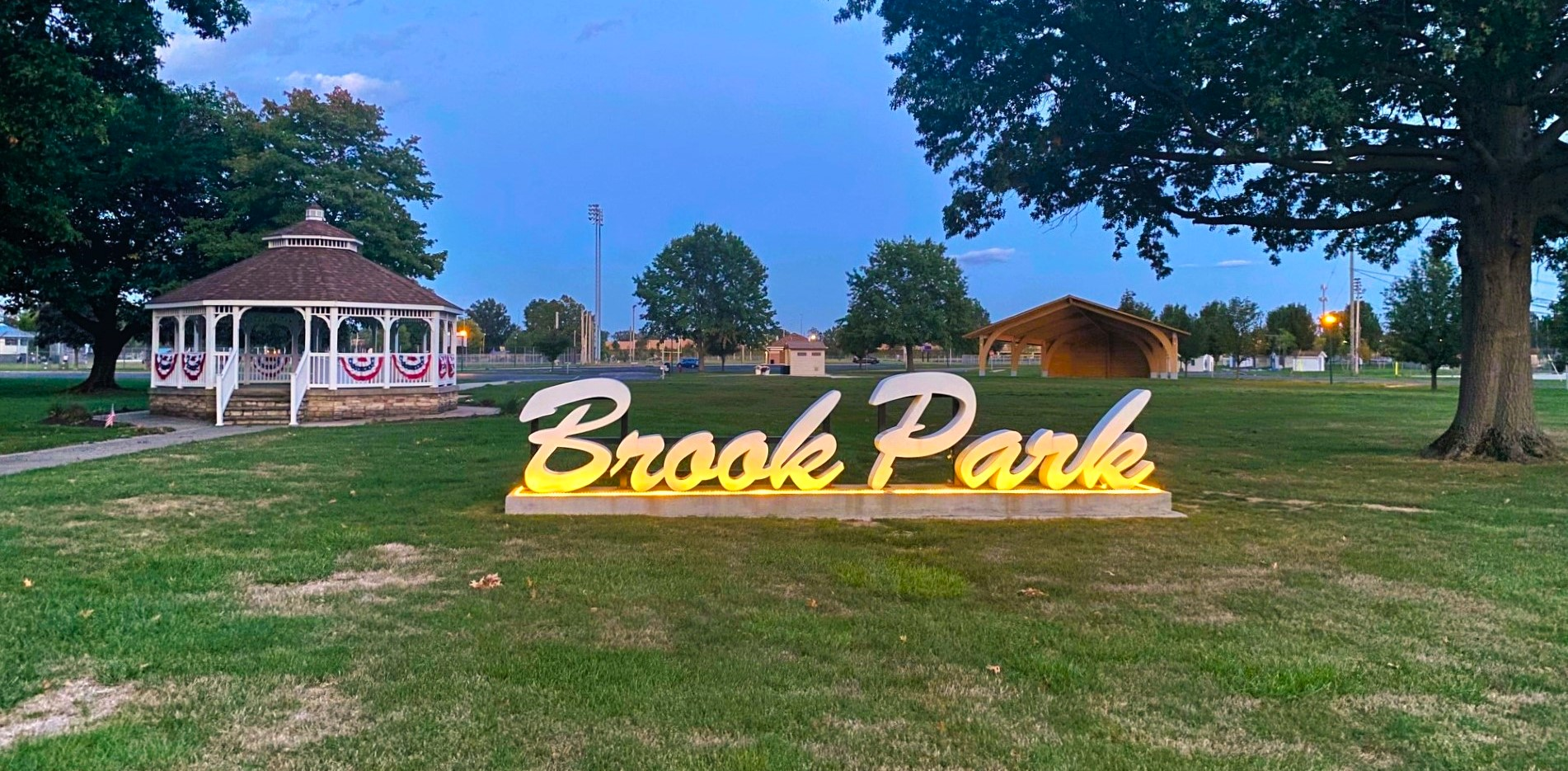
- Kennedy Park

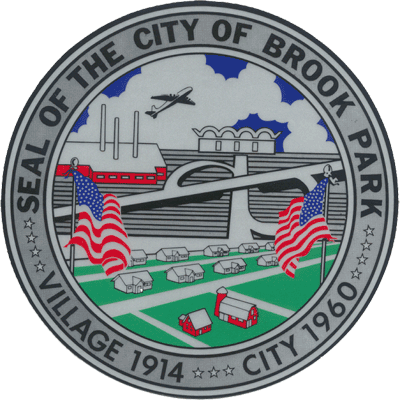
- Flag Seal
- Interactive map of Brook Park, Ohio
- Location within Ohio Location within the United States
- Coordinates: 41°23′58″N 081°49′06″W
- Country: United States
- State: Ohio
- County: Cuyahoga
- Incorporated: 1914 (village); 1960 (city)

Government
  - Type: Mayor & Council
  - Mayor: Edward Orcutt (I)
  - President of Council: Richard A. Salvatore (D)

Area
  - Total: 7.52 sq mi (19.47 km^{2})
  - Land: 7.51 sq mi (19.46 km^{2})
  - Water: 0.0039 sq mi (0.01 km^{2})
- Elevation: 797 ft (243 m)

Population (2020)
  - Total: 18,595
  - Estimate (2023): 18,063
  - Density: 2,474.4/sq mi (955.36/km^{2})
- Time zone: UTC-5 (Eastern (EST))
  - Summer (DST): UTC-4 (EST)
- ZIP code: 44142
- Area code: 216
- FIPS code: 39-09288
- GNIS feature ID: 1048554
- Website: cityofbrookpark.com

Brook Park is a city in Cuyahoga County, Ohio, United States. The population was 18,595 at the 2020 census. It is a suburb of Cleveland.

== History ==
Brook Park became a city in 1960. The city attracted national attention when 21 Marines of the 3rd battalion, 25th Marines Regiment, 4th Marine division headquartered in the city were killed in combat in Iraq on August 1 and August 3, 2005. The unit lost 48 Marines during the course of the deployment. On August 5, the city government printed and distributed American flags for every household in the city to display on their windows. On August 8, thousands of citizens from throughout Northeast Ohio attended a memorial service to show their support for the fallen Marines. National, state and local politicians also voiced their mutual support for the families affected and for the ongoing support needed for all of the service members still involved in their mission overseas.

Thomas J. Coyne Jr. was re-elected mayor on November 5, 2013, after 12 years out of the office, which had been held by Mark J. Elliot. Coyne had been the Mayor of Brook Park from 1981 to 2002. Coyne is most known for the 2001 Cleveland Hopkins International Airport runway extension deal with then Mayor of Cleveland Michael R. White, which ceded Brook Park land including homes and the International Exposition Center (IX Center) to Cleveland in exchange for NASA Glenn Research Center and ten years of tax revenues from the IX Center.

== Geography ==
Brook Park is located at 41°23′58″N 81°49′6″W (41.399550, −81.818423).

According to the United States Census Bureau, the city has a total area of 7.53 square miles (19.50 km^{2}), all land.

While Brook Park's official name has always been spelled as two words, it is sometimes mistakenly seen spelled as one word, which is the spelling of nearby Brookpark Road.

== Demographics ==
Historical population
Census	Pop.	Note	%±
1920	861		—
1930	837		−2.8%
1940	1,122		34.1%
1950	2,606		132.3%
1960	12,856		393.3%
1970	30,774		139.4%
1980	26,195		−14.9%
1990	22,865		−12.7%
2000	21,218		−7.2%
2010	19,212		−9.5%
2020	18,595		−3.2%
2023 (est.)	18,063		−2.9%

In 2016, 93.9% of residents spoke English, 1.8% Spanish, 1.2% German, and 0.6% Greek.

=== Racial and ethnic composition ===
Brook Park city, Ohio – Racial and ethnic composition Note: the US Census treats Hispanic/Latino as an ethnic category. This table excludes Latinos from the racial categories and assigns them to a separate category. Hispanics/Latinos may be of any race.
Race / Ethnicity (NH = Non-Hispanic)	Pop 2000	Pop 2010	Pop 2020	% 2000	% 2010	% 2020
White alone (NH)	19,811	17,286	15,332	93.37%	89.98%	82.45%
Black or African American alone (NH)	409	600	772	1.93%	3.12%	4.15%
Native American or Alaska Native alone (NH)	44	28	13	0.21%	0.15%	0.07%
Asian alone (NH)	266	301	447	1.25%	1.57%	2.40%
Native Hawaiian or Pacific Islander alone (NH)	0	2	1	0.00%	0.01%	0.01%
Other race alone (NH)	24	19	55	0.11%	0.10%	0.30%
Mixed race or Multiracial (NH)	241	314	827	1.14%	1.63%	4.45%
Hispanic or Latino (any race)	423	662	1,148	1.99%	3.45%	6.17%
Total	21,218	19,212	18,595	100.00%	100.00%	100.00%

=== 2020 census ===
As of the 2020 census, Brook Park had a population of 18,595. The median age was 44.5 years. 18.3% of residents were under the age of 18 and 21.0% of residents were 65 years of age or older. For every 100 females there were 93.9 males, and for every 100 females age 18 and over there were 92.1 males.

100.0% of residents lived in urban areas, while 0% lived in rural areas.

There were 7,793 households in Brook Park, of which 24.4% had children under the age of 18 living in them. Of all households, 42.0% were married-couple households, 20.4% were households with a male householder and no spouse or partner present, and 29.8% were households with a female householder and no spouse or partner present. About 30.0% of all households were made up of individuals and 14.8% had someone living alone who was 65 years of age or older.

There were 8,123 housing units, of which 4.1% were vacant. Among occupied housing units, 79.5% were owner-occupied and 20.5% were renter-occupied. The homeowner vacancy rate was 1.3% and the rental vacancy rate was 4.5%.

Racial composition as of the 2020 census
Race	Number	Percent
White	15,675	84.3%
Black or African American	804	4.3%
American Indian and Alaska Native	26	0.1%
Asian	447	2.4%
Native Hawaiian and Other Pacific Islander	2	<0.1%
Some other race	378	2.0%
Two or more races	1,263	6.8%
Hispanic or Latino (of any race)	1,148	6.2%

=== 2010 census ===
As of the census of 2010, there were 19,212 people, 7,799 households, and 5,318 families living in the city. The population density was 2,551.4 inhabitants per square mile (985.1/km^{2}). There were 8,171 housing units at an average density of 1,085.1 per square mile (419.0/km^{2}). The racial makeup of the city was 92.2% White, 3.2% African American, 0.2% Native American, 1.6% Asian, 0.9% from other races, and 1.9% from two or more races. Hispanic or Latino of any race were 3.4% of the population.

There were 7,799 households, of which 28.7% had children under the age of 18 living with them, 48.6% were married couples living together, 14.6% had a female householder with no husband present, 5.1% had a male householder with no wife present, and 31.8% were non-families. 27.6% of all households were made up of individuals, and 13.5% had someone living alone who was 65 years of age or older. The average household size was 2.45 and the average family size was 2.97.

The median age in the city was 43.8 years. 21% of residents were under the age of 18; 7.5% were between the ages of 18 and 24; 23.2% were from 25 to 44; 28.3% were from 45 to 64; and 19.8% were 65 years of age or older. The gender makeup of the city was 48.0% male and 52.0% female.

=== 2000 census ===
As of the census of 2000, there were 21,218 people, 8,193 households, and 5,989 families living in the city. The population density was 2,815.1 inhabitants per square mile (1,086.9/km^{2}). There were 8,370 housing units at an average density of 1,110.5 per square mile (428.8/km^{2}). The racial makeup of the city was 94.49% White, 1.95% African American, 0.23% Native American, 1.26% Asian, 0.77% from other races, and 1.30% from two or more races. Hispanic or Latino of any race were 1.99% of the population.

There were 8,193 households, out of which 29.0% had children under the age of 18 living with them, 57.3% were married couples living together, 12.0% had a female householder with no husband present, and 26.9% were non-families. 23.6% of all households were made up of individuals, and 10.8% had someone living alone who was 65 years of age or older. The average household size was 2.58 and the average family size was 3.06.

In the city the population was spread out, with 22.8% under the age of 18, 7.2% from 18 to 24, 28.8% from 25 to 44, 24.2% from 45 to 64, and 17.1% who were 65 years of age or older. The median age was 40 years. For every 100 females, there were 95.4 males. For every 100 females age 18 and over, there were 90.7 males.

The median income for a household in the city was $46,333, and the median income for a family was $53,324. Males had a median income of $40,202 versus $25,943 for females. The per capita income for the city was $20,411. About 3.5% of families and 4.6% of the population were below the poverty line, including 7.3% of those under age 18 and 3.7% of those age 65 or over.

== Economy ==
According to Brook Park's 2022 Annual Comprehensive Financial Report, the top employers in the city were:

#	Employer	# of Employees
1	Ford Motor Company	1,875
2	U.S. Department of the Interior	1,647
3	Marc's	591
4	Global Technical Recruiters	481
5	Group Management Services	456
6	Minute Men Inc	426
7	Unicare Life & Health Ins	328
8	Vesuvius USA Corp	321
9	East Park Operations LLC	294
10	City of Brook Park	276

== Sports ==
The Cleveland Browns professional football team plans to move from Huntington Bank Field in Downtown Cleveland to a new stadium in Brook Park, which will bear the same name.

== Education ==
Brook Park is part of the Berea City School District. Elementary students attend Brook Park Elementary school. Middle School students attend Middleburg Heights Junior High School (former Midpark High School), in the neighboring city of Middleburg Heights; High school students attend Berea–Midpark High School, in the neighboring city of Berea.

== Notable people ==
- Brian Poindexter, politician.

== See also ==
- Cleveland Engine
