= József Kovács (wrestler) =

Hungarian wrestler

Personal information
- Nationality: Hungarian
- Born: 1929 Csongrád, Hungary
- Died: August 1990 (aged 60–61) Hamburg, Germany

Sport
- Sport: Wrestling

József Kovács (1929 – August 1990) was a Hungarian wrestler. He competed in two events at the 1952 Summer Olympics.
