= Willi Waltner =

German wrestler

Personal information
- Nationality: German
- Born: 25 January 1934 Cologne, Germany
- Died: 26 July 1966 (aged 32) Bonn, West Germany

Sport
- Sport: Wrestling

Willi Waltner (25 January 1934 – 26 July 1966) was a German wrestler. He competed in the men's Greco-Roman heavyweight at the 1952 Summer Olympics. He placed fourth in the Greco-Roman style and seventh in freestyle wrestling. Waltner also competed at the 1953 World Championships, securing seventh place.
