= Middleburg Heights, Ohio =

- City
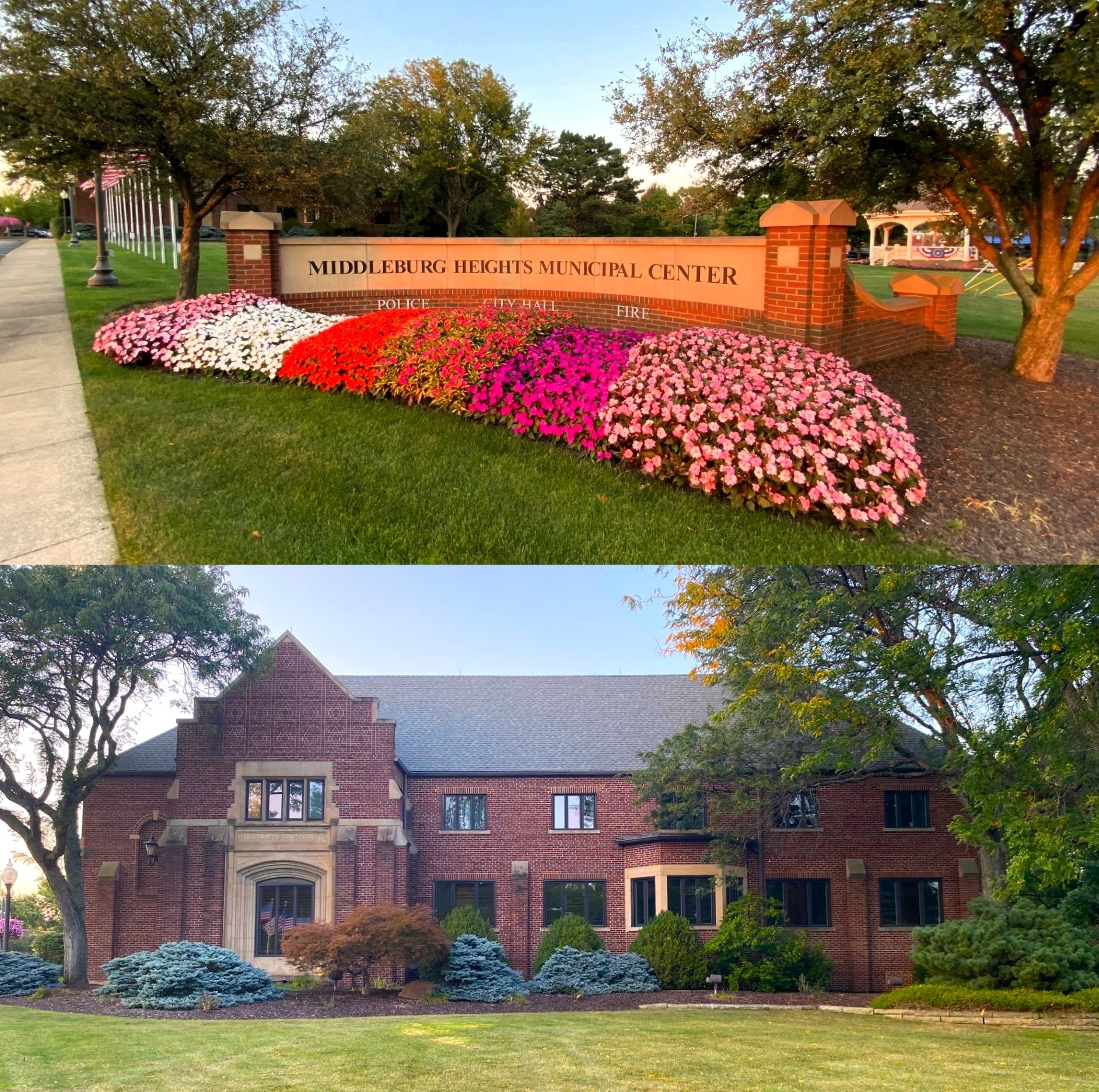
- Municipal Center entrance with City Hall at bottom

- Flag Seal Logo
- Interactive map of Middleburg Heights, Ohio
- Location within Ohio Location within the United States
- Coordinates: 41°22′0″N 81°48′32″W
- Country: United States
- State: Ohio
- County: Cuyahoga
- Village: 1928
- City: 1961

Government
  - Type: Mayor & Council
  - Mayor: Matthew Castelli

Area
  - Total: 8.07 sq mi (20.91 km^{2})
  - Land: 8.06 sq mi (20.88 km^{2})
  - Water: 0.012 sq mi (0.03 km^{2})
- Elevation: 853 ft (260 m)

Population (2020)
  - Total: 16,004
  - Density: 1,984.9/sq mi (766.37/km^{2})
- Time zone: UTC-5 (Eastern (EST))
  - Summer (DST): UTC-4 (EDT)
- ZIP code: 44130
- Area code: 440 216
- FIPS code: 39-49644
- GNIS feature ID: 1048974
- Website: www.middleburgheights.com

Middleburg Heights is a city in Cuyahoga County, Ohio, United States. It is a suburb about 11 miles (18 km) southwest of downtown Cleveland. The population was 16,004 at the 2020 census.

== History ==
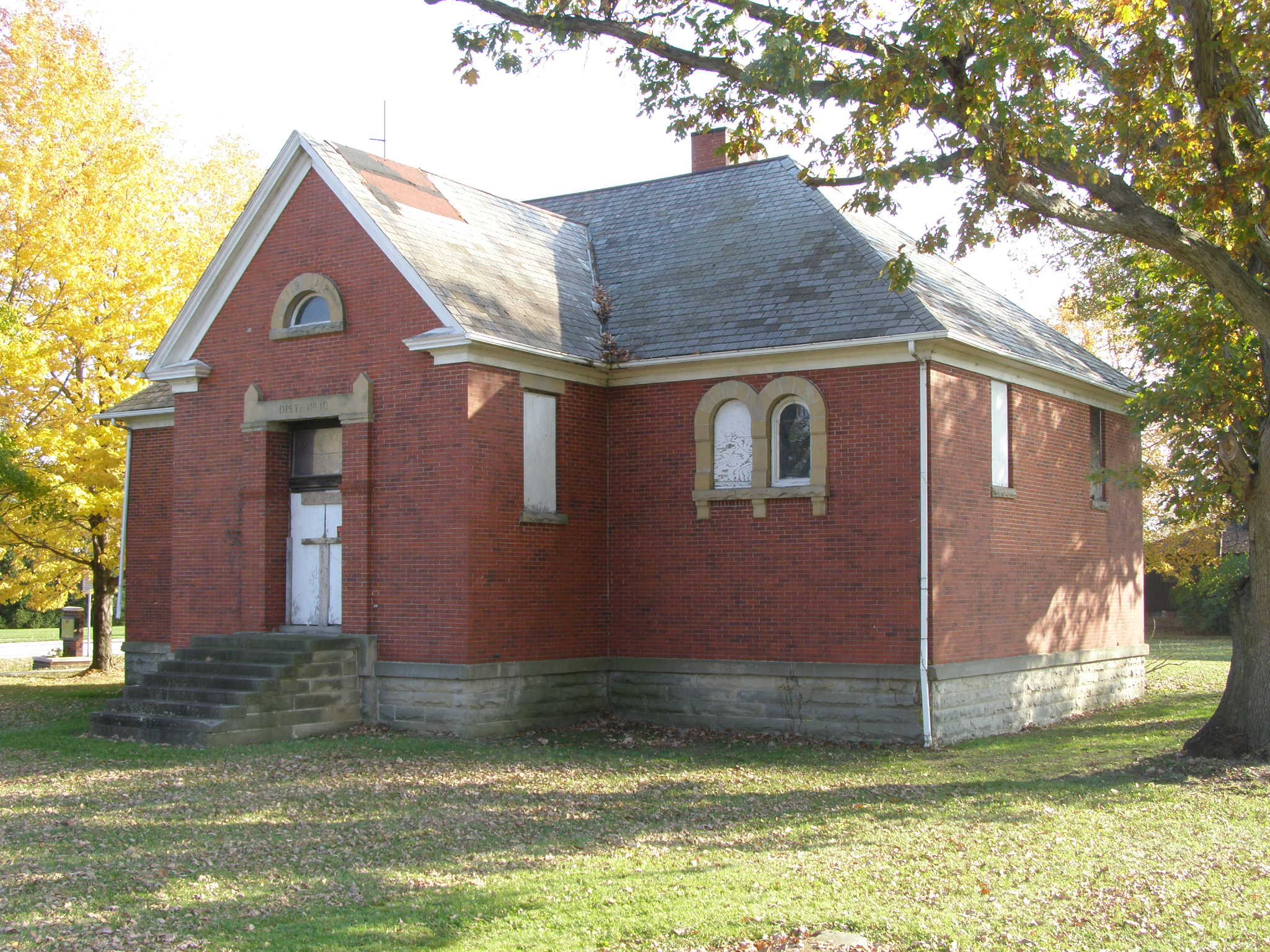
Old District 10 Schoolhouse

Middleburg Heights is part of the historic Connecticut Western Reserve, which the State of Connecticut "Reserved" for their own purposes when in 1786 Connecticut relinquished claim to some of its western lands and ceded them to the new Federal Government. The first European settlers to the area that became Middleburg Township were Jared Hickcox and his family. They were originally from Waterbury, Connecticut.

The Village of Middleburg Heights was established in 1928.

According to the United States Census Bureau, the city has a total area of 8.08 square miles (20.93 km^{2}), of which 8.07 square miles (20.90 km^{2}) is land and 0.01 square miles (0.03 km^{2}) is water.

== Geography ==
Middleburg Heights is located in the southwesterly portion of the Cleveland metropolitan area along US Route 42 approximately 11 miles (18 km) southwest of downtown Cleveland at 41°22′0″N 81°48′32″W (41.366725, -81.808893).

== Demographics ==
Historical population
| Census | Pop. | Note | %± |
|---|---|---|---|
| 1930 | 874 | | — |
| 1940 | 1,225 | | 40.2% |
| 1950 | 3,299 | | 169.3% |
| 1960 | 7,282 | | 120.7% |
| 1970 | 12,367 | | 69.8% |
| 1980 | 16,228 | | 31.2% |
| 1990 | 14,702 | | −9.4% |
| 2000 | 15,542 | | 5.7% |
| 2010 | 15,946 | | 2.6% |
| 2020 | 16,004 | | 0.4% |
| 2025 (est.) | 15,558 | | −2.8% |

=== Racial and ethnic composition ===
Middleburg Heights city, Ohio – Racial and ethnic composition Note: the US Census treats Hispanic/Latino as an ethnic category. This table excludes Latinos from the racial categories and assigns them to a separate category. Hispanics/Latinos may be of any race.
| Race / Ethnicity (NH = Non-Hispanic) | Pop 2000 | Pop 2010 | Pop 2020 | % 2000 | % 2010 | % 2020 |
|---|---|---|---|---|---|---|
| White alone (NH) | 14,587 | 14,287 | 13,234 | 93.86% | 89.60% | 82.7% |
| Black or African American alone (NH) | 206 | 249 | 362 | 1.33% | 1.56% | 2.3% |
| Native American or Alaska Native alone (NH) | 17 | 25 | 33 | 0.11% | 0.16% | 0.2% |
| Asian alone (NH) | 350 | 882 | 1,415 | 2.25% | 5.53% | 8.8% |
| Native Hawaiian or Pacific Islander alone (NH) | 10 | 4 | 7 | 0.06% | 0.03% | 0.0% |
| Other race alone (NH) | 5 | 8 | 209 | 0.03% | 0.05% | 1.3% |
| Mixed race or Multiracial (NH) | 170 | 135 | 744 | 1.09% | 0.85% | 4.6% |
| Hispanic or Latino (any race) | 197 | 356 | 689 | 1.27% | 2.23% | 4.3% |
| Total | 15,542 | 15,946 | 16,004 | 100.00% | 100.00% | 100.00% |

=== 2020 census ===
As of the 2020 census, Middleburg Heights had a population of 16,004. The median age was 47.5 years; 16.2% of residents were under the age of 18 and 25.0% of residents were 65 years of age or older. For every 100 females there were 91.1 males, and for every 100 females age 18 and over there were 88.4 males.

100.0% of residents lived in urban areas, while 0.0% lived in rural areas.

There were 7,200 households in Middleburg Heights, of which 21.4% had children under the age of 18 living in them. Of all households, 45.3% were married-couple households, 19.2% were households with a male householder and no spouse or partner present, and 29.9% were households with a female householder and no spouse or partner present. About 35.4% of all households were made up of individuals and 15.1% had someone living alone who was 65 years of age or older.

There were 7,516 housing units, of which 4.2% were vacant. The homeowner vacancy rate was 1.0% and the rental vacancy rate was 5.1%.

Racial composition as of the 2020 census
| Race | Number | Percent |
|---|---|---|
| White | 13,234 | 82.7% |
| Black or African American | 362 | 2.3% |
| American Indian and Alaska Native | 33 | 0.2% |
| Asian | 1,415 | 8.8% |
| Native Hawaiian and Other Pacific Islander | 7 | 0.0% |
| Some other race | 209 | 1.3% |
| Two or more races | 744 | 4.6% |
| Hispanic or Latino (of any race) | 689 | 4.3% |

=== 2010 census ===
At the 2010 census, there were 15,946 people, 7,114 households and 4,234 families living in the city. The population density was 1,976.0 inhabitants per square mile (762.9/km^{2}). There were 7,586 housing units at an average density of 940.0 per square mile (362.9/km^{2}). The racial makeup of the city was 91.1% White, 1.6% African American, 0.2% Native American, 5.6% Asian, 0.6% from other races, and 0.9% from two or more races. Hispanic or Latino of any race were 2.2% of the population.

There were 7,114 households, of which 22.8% had children under the age of 18 living with them, 46.6% were married couples living together, 9.4% had a female householder with no husband present, 3.5% had a male householder with no wife present, and 40.5% were non-families. 35.3% of all households were made up of individuals, and 13.9% had someone living alone who was 65 years of age or older. The average household size was 2.18 and the average family size was 2.84.

The median age was 46.6 years. 17.5% of residents were under the age of 18; 6.7% were between the ages of 18 and 24; 23.5% were from 25 to 44; 29.2% were from 45 to 64; and 23.1% were 65 years of age or older. The gender makeup of the city was 47.3% male and 52.7% female.

=== 2000 census ===
At the 2000 census, there were 15,542 people, 6,705 households and 4,257 families living in the city. The population density was 1,924.8 inhabitants per square mile (743.2/km^{2}). There were 7,094 housing units at an average density of 878.6 per square mile (339.2/km^{2}). The racial makeup of the city was 94.63% White, 1.33% African American, 0.15% Native American, 2.26% Asian, 0.07% Pacific Islander, 0.28% from other races, and 1.28% from two or more races. Hispanic or Latino of any race were 1.27% of the population.

There were 6,705 households, of which 21.4% had children under the age of 18 living with them, 52.0% were married couples living together, 8.2% had a female householder with no husband present, and 36.5% were non-families. 31.8% of all households were made up of individuals, and 11.8% had someone living alone who was 65 years of age or older. The average household size was 2.25 and the average family size was 2.84.

17.7% of the population were under the age of 18, 7.3% from 18 to 24, 27.7% from 25 to 44, 25.7% from 45 to 64, and 21.7% who were 65 years of age or older. The median age was 43 years. For every 100 females, there were 90.1 males. For every 100 females age 18 and over, there were 87.9 males.

The median household income was $47,893 and the median family income was $60,015. Males had a median income of $44,707 compared with $28,608 for females. The per capita income was $25,201. About 2.0% of families and 3.0% of the population were below the poverty line, including 2.2% of those under age 18 and 2.6% of those age 65 or over.

== Government ==
Middleburg Heights has a mayor and council form of government. The mayor is a non-voting member of the city council.

Matthew Castelli became mayor on 8 January 2019 filling the vacancy created when Gary Starr resigned. Starr announced his resignation on 27 November 2018 after having served in that position for 37 years.
