= Albert Boynton Storms =

American university president

Albert Boynton Storms (April 1, 1860 – July 1, 1933) was a professor, university administrator, and Methodist theologian. He was President of Iowa State University, Ames, Iowa; and the second president of Baldwin-Wallace College, Berea, Ohio.

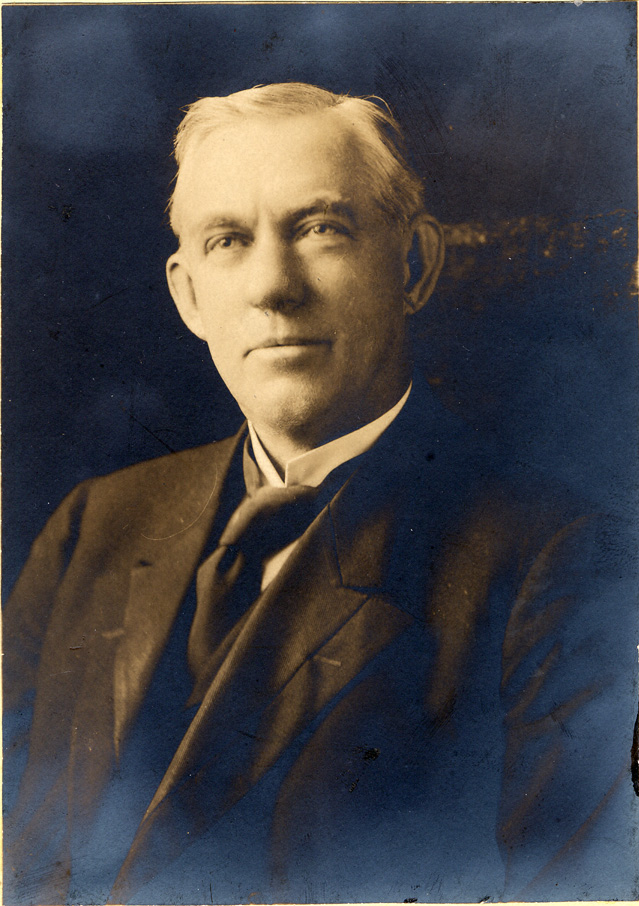
Albert Boynton Storms, circa 1905

== Education ==
Storms was born in Ann Arbor, Michigan in 1860. He graduated the public schools of Ann Arbor and then attended the University of Michigan, earning his A.B. in 1883, and his master's degree in 1884.

== Early career ==
Storms immediately entered the ministry, in the Detroit conference of the Methodist Episcopal Church in 1884, and apprenticing until his ordination in 1886. During this time, he served in numerous pastorates in Franklin, Michigan, Hudson, Michigan, Harper Avenue Methodist Episcopal Church and Gass Avenue Methodist Episcopal Church in Detroit. He then served in churches in Madison, Wisconsin, and Des Moines, Iowa.

== College Administrator ==
Storms' reputation grew, and he was given the post of President of the Iowa State College, (now, Iowa State University) in 1903. During this period, Storms was awarded honorary doctorates from Lawrence University in 1903 and Drake University in 1905. Storms' skills as an administrator would blossom during this period.

== Return to Ministry ==
After seven years at Iowa State, Storms returned to the ministry. He served as pastor of the Central Avenue Methodist Church in Indianapolis, Indiana until 1915. He was instrumental in the Indianapolis Conference, and his skills did not go unnoticed. He was called to serve as the Second President of Baldwin-Wallace College in 1918.

== Return to Academia ==
When Storms arrived at Baldwin-Wallace, the fledgling college was in much disarray. The first president of the college, Arthur Louis Breslich was ousted by the student body for what appeared to be pro-German sentiments during the First World War. His fifteen years at Baldwin- Wallace were marked with phenomenal growth. To his credit, the College might have failed without his dillegence.

Storms oversaw the growth of enrollments, endowments, programs, and faculty during the postbellum period. He was the last college president to teach regular classes on top of his busy schedule as president.

== Sources ==
- Iowa State University", (1904-1924) Alumni Magazine
- Baldwin-Wallace College Archives Memoir of Albert Boynton Storms, Alumnus Magazine

Academic offices
Preceded by Arthur Louis Breslich	President of Baldwin-Wallace College; 1918–1933	Succeeded by Louis C. Wright
Preceded by William M. Beardshear	President of Iowa State University; 1903–1910	Succeeded by Raymond A. Pearson
