= Missouri Western State University =

Public university in St. Joseph, Missouri, US

- Former names: St. Joseph Junior College (1915–1965); Missouri Western Junior College (1965–1969); Missouri Western College (1969–1973); Missouri Western State College (1973–2005)
- Motto: Everything is Possible
- Type: Public university
- Established: 1915; 111 years ago
- President: Lenny Klaver
- Provost: Jay Johnson
- Students: 3,815
- Location: St. Joseph, Missouri, United States; 39°45′29″N 94°47′08″W
- Campus: Urban, 744 acres (301.1 ha)
- Colors: Black and gold
- Nickname: Griffons
- Sporting affiliations: NCAA Division II – The MIAA
- Mascot: Max the Griffon
- Website: missouriwestern.edu

Missouri Western State University (MWSU or MoWest) is a public university in St. Joseph, Missouri. As of 2023, it enrolled 3,815 students.

== History ==
Missouri Western State University was founded in 1915 as St. Joseph Junior College and held courses in the original location of Central High School at 13th and Patee. In 1933 when Central High School moved to its current location the junior college relocated to the Robidoux Polytechnic High School building at 10th Street between Edmond and Charles. In 1917 it adopted the Griffon as its mascot.

The establishment of a four-year school was a central campaign issue in the 1964 Democratic gubernatorial primary, when Warren Hearnes of the Bootheel challenged Hilary A. Bush of Kansas City. Hearnes promised to transform the college into a four-year institution despite the presence of another state university (then Northwest Missouri State College, now Northwest Missouri State University) 40 miles (64 km) to the north in Maryville.

Hearnes narrowly won the primary and then won general election. A year later, the college became Missouri Western Junior College, and was transferred from the St. Joseph School District to the Missouri Western Junior College District, comprising 11 school districts in five counties. The college was granted four-year status as Missouri Western College in 1969 during Hearnes' second term. The Missouri Western Junior College district funded the first two years, with the state funding the final two years.

Years later, Missouri Western named its library after Hearnes; school officials said Missouri Western would have never become a four-year college without him.

Shortly after the conversion, the college acquired the farm of St. Joseph State Hospital #2, on the east side of Interstate 29, for its campus on the east edge of St. Joseph. The original plan had called for it to be built across from the hospital, just west of Bishop LeBlond High School and closer to downtown St. Joseph.

The college became Missouri Western State College in 1973 and became fully supported by the state in 1977. It was granted university status in 2005 and began offering graduate degrees in 2007.

In 1988, Shalia Aery, commissioner of higher education under Governor John Ashcroft, recommended that Northwest close and leave Missouri Western as the surviving school. That plan was ultimately dropped.

Legislation in 2005 changed the institution's name to Missouri Western State University. That legislation designated Missouri Western as Missouri's Applied Learning Institution and allowed it to grant master's degrees. The university graduated its first 12 master's degree recipients in May 2009. In its first six years offering graduate degrees, graduate enrollment at Western grew by 100% or more each year. As of 2016, Western offered 18 master's degrees and six graduate certificates.

In 2010, the Steven L. Craig School of Business was accredited by AACSB International.

As of April 2020, the school planned to phase out or radically revising nearly 60 of its degree offerings. These changes were a response to years of "downward student enrollment trends, strained state funding resources, rising costs, deferred maintenance needs, long-term debt [and] now the economic impact of covid-19".

The university's most visible corporate affiliation is with Hillyard, Inc., a cleaning supplies company. The school's Spratt Memorial Stadium is named for Elliot "Bub" Spratt, an executive at the company. Leah Spratt Hall is named for a sister of Elliot. The university hosts the Hillyard Tip Off Basketball Classic tournament.

== Campus buildings ==
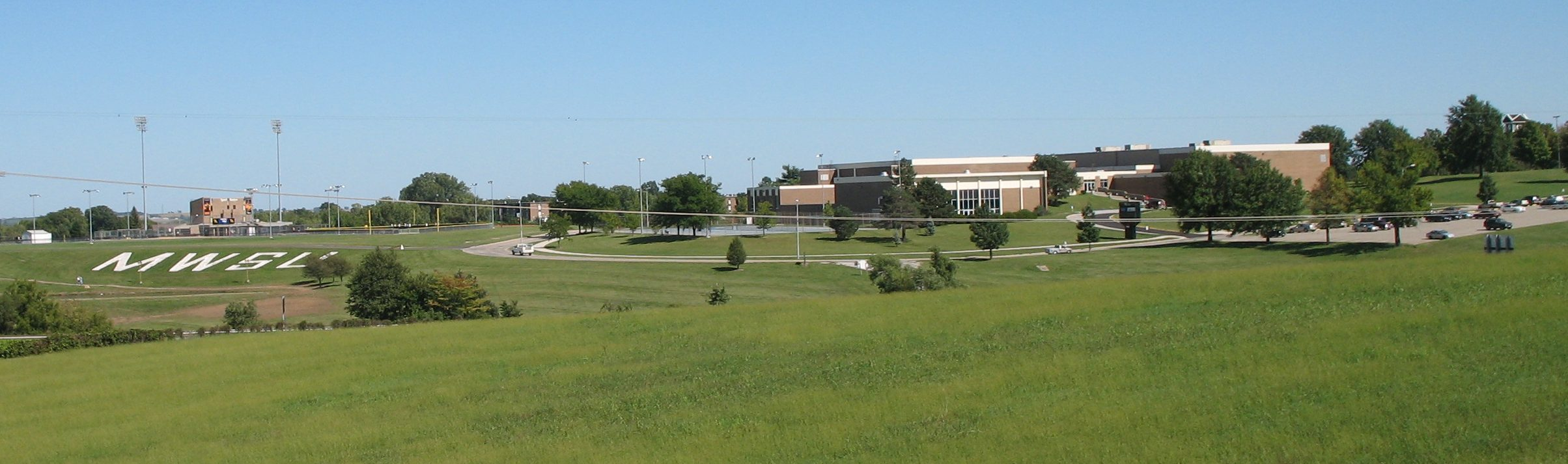
Missouri Western grounds from across Interstate 29 in 2007 prior to construction of the Kansas City Chiefs training camp (to the right of the MWSU sign)

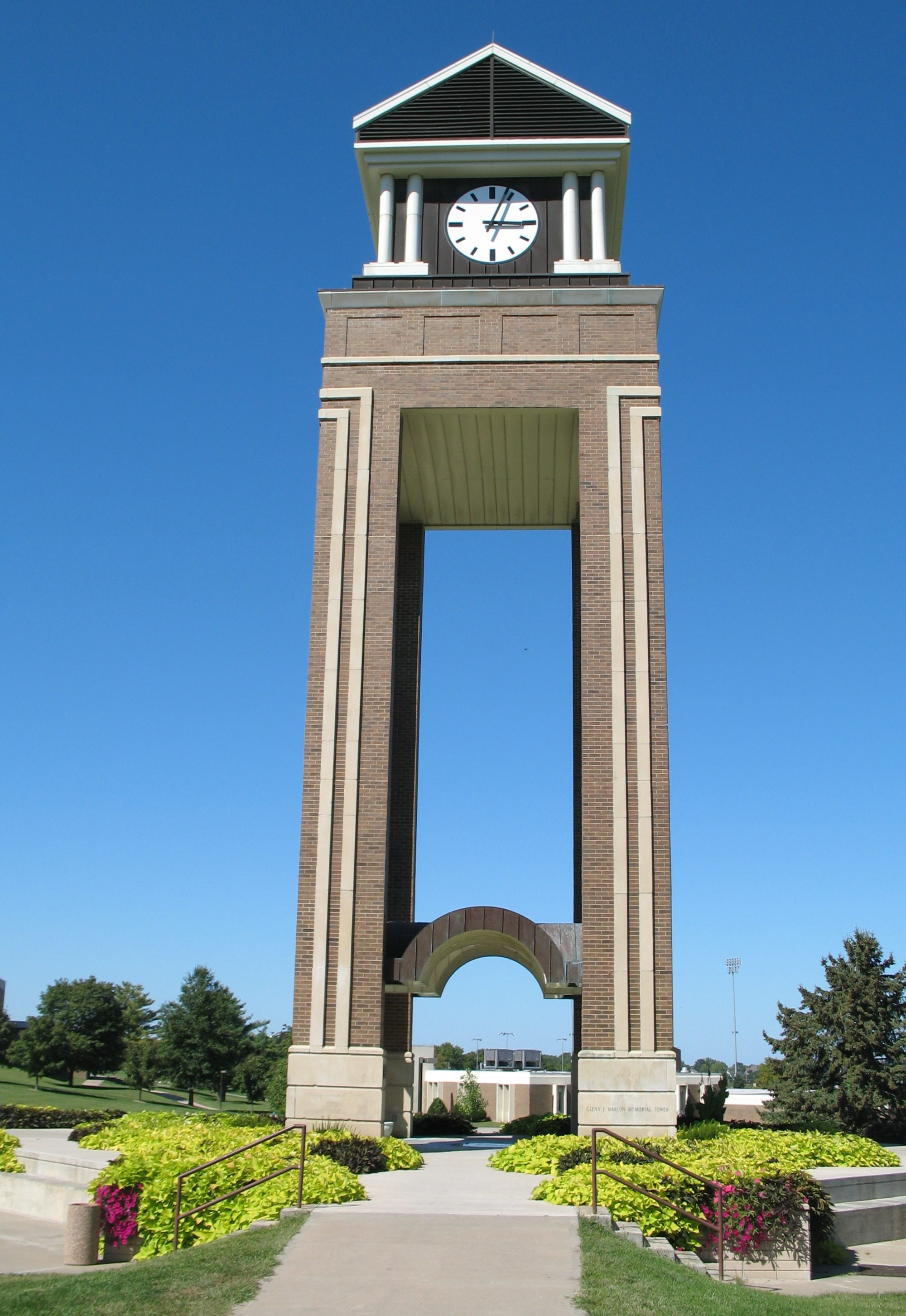
Campus clock

The main buildings of Missouri Western State University are all dedicated to someone who is an important part in MWSU's history.

Building name	Function
Agenstein Hall	Math and Science Departments
Baker Family Fitness Center	Student Fitness Center
Beshears Hall	Housing
Blum Union	Dining (Aramark), Center for Multiculture Education, Center for Student Engagement, Esports Arena, Health Center, Campus Police
Commons Building	Housing
Eder Hall	Admissions, Department of English and Modern Languages, Financial Aid, Student Affairs
Fulkerson Center	Conference rooms
Vartabedian Hall	Housing
Griffon Indoor Sports Complex	Athletic training facility, coaches' offices
Hearnes Center	Library, Bookstore, Center for Academic Support, Information Technology Services, Instructional Media Center
Houlne Center for Convergent Technology	Applied Learning Labs and Job Training in Manufacturing Technology, Industrial Technology, Construction, and Technology Services such as Artificial Intelligence, Cybersecurity, and Robotics
Juda Hall	Housing
Leaverton Hall	Housing
Logan Hall	Housing
Looney Complex	Athletics Department, (HPER)–Health, Physical Education, and Recreation Services
Missouri Department of Conservation	Missouri Department of Conservation, Biology department
Murphy Hall	Communication and Journalism; Education; Nursing and Allied Health; Psychology
Popplewell Hall	Administrative building, Stephen L. Craig School of Business, College of Professional Studies; Department of History, Philosophy, and Geography, Department of Economics, Political Science, & Sociology.
Potter Hall	Art and Music Departments
Remington Hall	Math and Science Departments
Scanlon Hall	Housing
Spratt Hall	Advancement offices, Alumni Relations, Foundation, Public Relations, Walter Cronkite Memorial
Vaselakos Hall	Housing
Wilson Hall	Criminal Justice, Legal Studies, Social Work, Engineering Technology, Military Science, and Law Enforcement Academy

== Athletics ==
Undergraduate demographics as of fall 2023
Race and ethnicity	Total
White	68%
Black	14%
Two or more races	8%
Unknown	4%
Asian	2%
Hispanic	2%
American Indian/Alaska Native	1%
International student	1%
Economic diversity
Low-income (Note: The percentage of students who received an income-based federal Pell grant intended for low-income students.)	41%
Affluent (Note: The percentage of students who are a part of the American middle class at the bare minimum.)	59%

Missouri Western is the home of the Griffons. MWSU competes in the Mid-America Intercollegiate Athletics Association and is in NCAA Division II. Its highest attended football games are in the Missouri Western–Northwest Missouri State football rivalry. Beginning in the fall of 2017, Missouri Western planned to add six new sports offering a total of 16 sports.

=== Kansas City Chiefs training camp ===
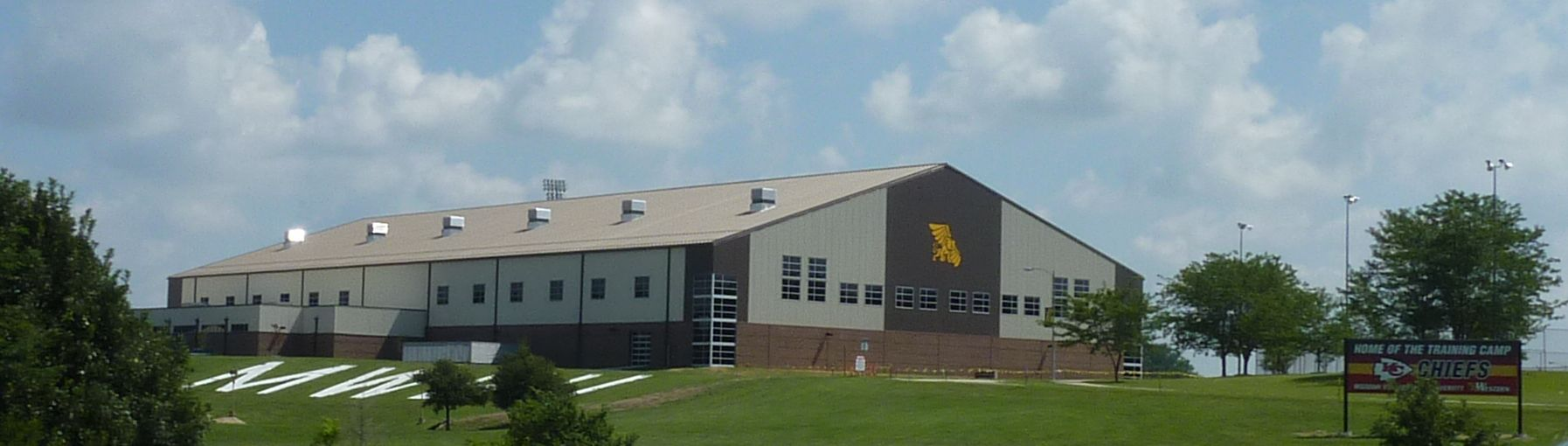
Kansas City Chiefs training camp

The school has been the summer training camp for the Kansas City Chiefs since 2010 (except 2020, when the COVID-19 pandemic prompted the National Football League to require all teams to hold camp at their home facilities). The $15.7 million facility was paid for by $10 million from the Chiefs (from state tax credits) and $1.2 million from student fees at Missouri Western, with the rest coming from the City of St. Joseph, Buchanan County and private donations. It was designed by St. Joseph architect firm Ellison-Auxier Architects, Inc., which designed the school's Spratt Hall and clock tower.

A climate-controlled, 120-yard NFL-regulation grass indoor field, with a locker room, weight room, training room, classrooms and office space was completed in the summer of 2010.

== National Undergraduate Research Clearinghouse ==
The National Undergraduate Research Clearinghouse was created using National Science Foundation funds awarded to the institution under Brian Cronk. The clearinghouse is an online repository where undergraduates in STEM fields can post articles subject to faculty approval (rather than a formal peer review). It has been online since 1997, and has been featured in magazines such as Science and Nature. Articles from the clearinghouse have been used as resources for journalists at publications including the Wall Street Journal and the Los Angeles Daily News. The Clearinghouse was deactivated in January 2024; however, an archive of the articles exists at the Web Archive.

== Notable alumni ==
- Roger Allen III, professional football player
- David Bass, professional football player
- Charles Bruffy, Grammy Award-winning artistic director of the Kansas City Chorale, chorus director of the Kansas City Symphony
- Lavell Crawford, actor
- Ty Danielson, college basketball coach
- Richard Durst, Baldwin-Wallace University president emeritus
- Brice Garnett, PGA Tour golfer
- Esther George, president of Federal Reserve Bank of Kansas City
- Elijah Haahr, Missouri state representative
- Michael Hill, professional football player in the NFL
- Tim Houlne, businessman and author on outsourcing and artificial intelligence
- Christel Marquardt, judge on the Kansas Court of Appeals
- Jonathan Owens, professional football player
- Paul Rhoads, football coach
- Gijon Robinson, professional football player
- Rob Schaaf, Missouri state senator
- Sam Webb, professional football player
- Greg Zuerlein, professional football player
