= WBWC =

Radio station at Baldwin Wallace University in Berea, Ohio

WBWC "The Sting"
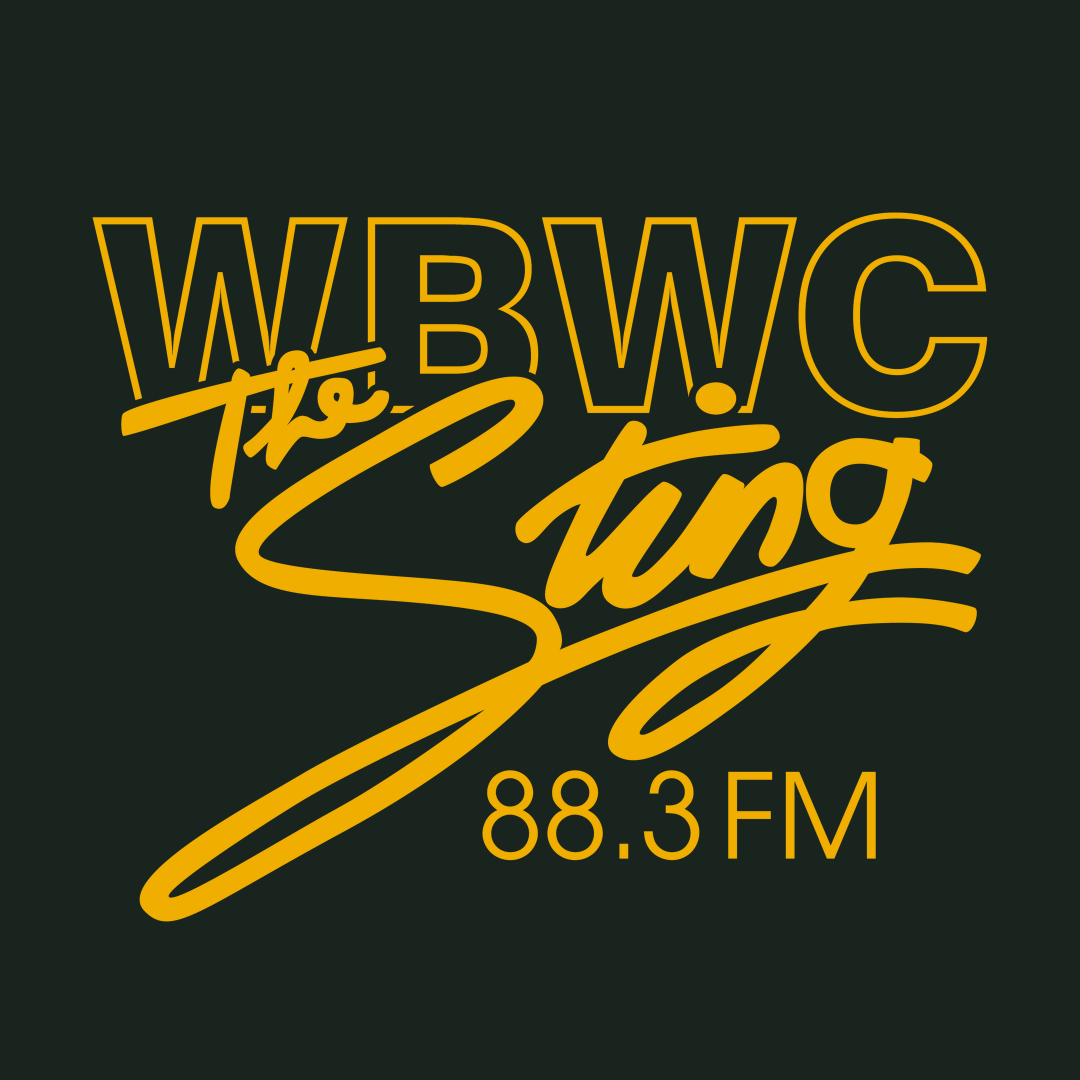
- Berea, Ohio; United States
- Broadcast area: Greater Cleveland (limited)
- Frequency: 88.3 MHz
- Branding: 88.3 FM The Sting

Programming
- Format: College radio Alternative rock
- Affiliations: Associated Press

Ownership
- Owner: Baldwin Wallace University

History
- First air date: March 1, 1958
- Call sign meaning: former university name Baldwin–Wallace College; also stands for "Baldwin–Wallace Communications"

Technical information
- Licensing authority: FCC
- Facility ID: 3638
- Class: A
- ERP: 4,000 watts
- HAAT: 78 meters (256 ft)
- Transmitter coordinates: 41°25′5.00″N 81°54′3.00″W

Links
- Public license information: "The Sting" Public file; LMS
- Webcast: Listen Live
- Website: wbwc.com

WBWC (88.3 FM) – branded 88.3 FM The Sting – is a non-commercial educational college/alternative rock radio station licensed in Berea, Ohio, serving western parts of Greater Cleveland. Owned by Baldwin Wallace University, the station is operated mainly by students with faculty advisors present. The WBWC studios are located at Loomis Hall on the Baldwin Wallace campus in Berea, while the station transmitter resides in North Olmsted.

== Current Programming ==
WBWC airs 24 hours of modern rock and alternative music every day with live play by play of Baldwin Wallace Yellow Jacket Athletics available over the air or online on WBWC-2. During weekday overnights, the station airs a variety of music styles through student and alumni specialty shows. On Sunday evening, the station airs a block referred to by on air hosts as "Oldies Alternative" including 3 shows: "The Golden Age of Rock and Roll" from 6-8pm, hosted by John Basalla, "Sunday Night at the Oldies" from 8-10pm, hosted by Tom LaMoreaux, and "Oldies Amplified" from 11pm-2am, hosted by Andrew Hoty. Public Service to the community includes news via the Associated Press at the start of every hour. During the summer months, WBWC airs the weekly Summer Marathon Series: every Thursday, the station features 18 hours of music centered on a particular artist or theme.

== History ==
In 1939 Baldwin Wallace University (then Baldwin Wallace College) first applied for and got their first Federal Communications Commission (FCC) Radio License. They did nothing with it until in 1946 the college's Speech Department revisited the idea, but it wasn't until 1955, when a group of 9 students asked Student Council to help bring a radio station to campus. Many campaigns to finance this new radio station happen in the years leading up to when WBWC would first sign on in 1958. Before that could happen though they would need permission from the FCC which was granted on May 8, 1957.

The studios behind the bleachers in the Ursprung Gymnasium was completed in October, and on February 2, 1958, a 68 ft antenna tower was raised just outside the gymnasium with lots of student help. The Cleveland Plain Dealer would write an article about this feat and was published on February 3, 1958. Then, on the week of February 24, the FCC would grant WBWC a license to broadcast at 10 Watts on 88.3 FM. From February 25 to March 1 of 1958 there were various test broadcasts done to make sure equipment was working. One such broadcast included the class AA Sectional Basketball Tournament games being held in the adjacent gymnaisum, with then WBWC's Sports Director Bob McLean and crew providing play-by-play coverage.

On Sunday March 2, 1958 WBWC officially signed on as the first totally student funded and operated radio station in the United States. WBWC would also be the first college radio station in the Northeastern Ohio area. There was a huge ceremony held for the occasion, having a go on the sound board was Baldwin Wallace College President Dr. Alfred Byran Bonds Jr., Station Manager Jim Huta, Student Council President Lou Cessaratto, and City of Berea Mayor Ernest R. Quackenbush. The station would just broadcast for a few hours everyday, and would go off-air over the summer break for the near future.

In the fall of 1959 work would begin to create a companion AM "carrier current" that would send signal through the electrical lines equipped in buildings. On November 3, 1960, the first broadcast on the AM carrier current happened, and would be dubbed the Stardust program, which allowed students to listen to music while studying on the late evenings. Two days later the AM Carrier would broadcast play-by-play for the Baldwin Wallace v. Heidelberg football game. In 1969 WBWC remained on-air over the summer, but this would prove to be a one-time occurrence until the min 70's. On Monday January 1970 WBWC did a 105 hour long marathon with the purpose of raising money for the Muscular Dystrophy Association. This would also become a collegiate record for the longest single broadcast. In 1971 B.R. Anthony debuts his specialty show to WBWC, originally called "The Glory That Was Grease" now known as "The Golden Age of Rock and Roll" which still airs today every Sunday night.

Over the summer of 1973 WBWC's studios underwent renovations but due to them going longer than expected WBWC would not sign back on until October. While this was going on Student Senate began an investigation into the operations of WBWC and major changes would happen the high-ups. In the early months of 1975 WBWC would begin broadcasting in stereo for their listeners. The Summer of 1975 would be the start of WBWC remaining on-air over the summer months. In September 1976 the broadcasting tower was hit by lightning causing operations to cease until January 1977 due to the new need for a working antenna. In 1978 the station received a construction permit from the FCC to raise power to 1000 watts, but the officer's council voted down the power increase.

On March 27, 1980, the first official marathon would happen. It was hosted by Russ Lindsay and was a 18-hour marathon of Elton John. The following Summer the annual Summer Marathon Series would begin. In 1981 WBWC would raise their power to 100 watts, the new FCC minimum. In the Summer on 1983 the Summer Marathon Series would be moved from Tuesdays to Thursdays, where it remains today. In 1984 WBWC's studios would be moved to the second floor of the Strosacker College Union causing the station to go off-air for about 6 months. 1984 would also see the start of "Sunday Night at the Oldies," a specialty show hosted by Tom LaMoreaux that still airs now, every Sunday night. In 1989 WBWC Switches to a professionally modeled Alternative Rock hits format.

On September 10, 1993, WBWC was granted permission to increase their power to 3000 watts, but would need to move to the frequency 91.5 FM, requiring WOBC to move to the frequency 88.3 FM, which was agreed but a new management team decided to back out. This year WBWC would no longer be a student organization, and funding would change from the Student Senate to the Speech Department. In 1994 "The Sting" was created and has stayed around into the current day. In 1995, Baldwin Wallace celebrated 150 years, during this celebration WBWC became the very first college radio station to perform a remote broadcast from the Rock and Roll Hall of Fame in Cleveland. A similar broadcast occurs later from Gund Arena for a Baldwin Wallace v. John Carroll Basketball game.

On February 14, 2001, WBWC increases its power to 4000 watts, where it is at currently today. On June 12, 2003, WBWC would broadcast a U2 marathon from the Rock and Roll Hall of Fame as a part of their Summer Marathon Series. The following year WBWC would do the same with The Who. WBWC was the only radio station in Cleveland to carry the "Vote For Change" tour live from Washington D.C.

In August 2022, before the start of the fall semester, WBWC moved studios once again, into Loomis Hall, just next door to the Student Union. In March 2024 WBWC celebrated its latest milestone of 65 years of broadcasting.
