= List of presidents of Baldwin Wallace University =

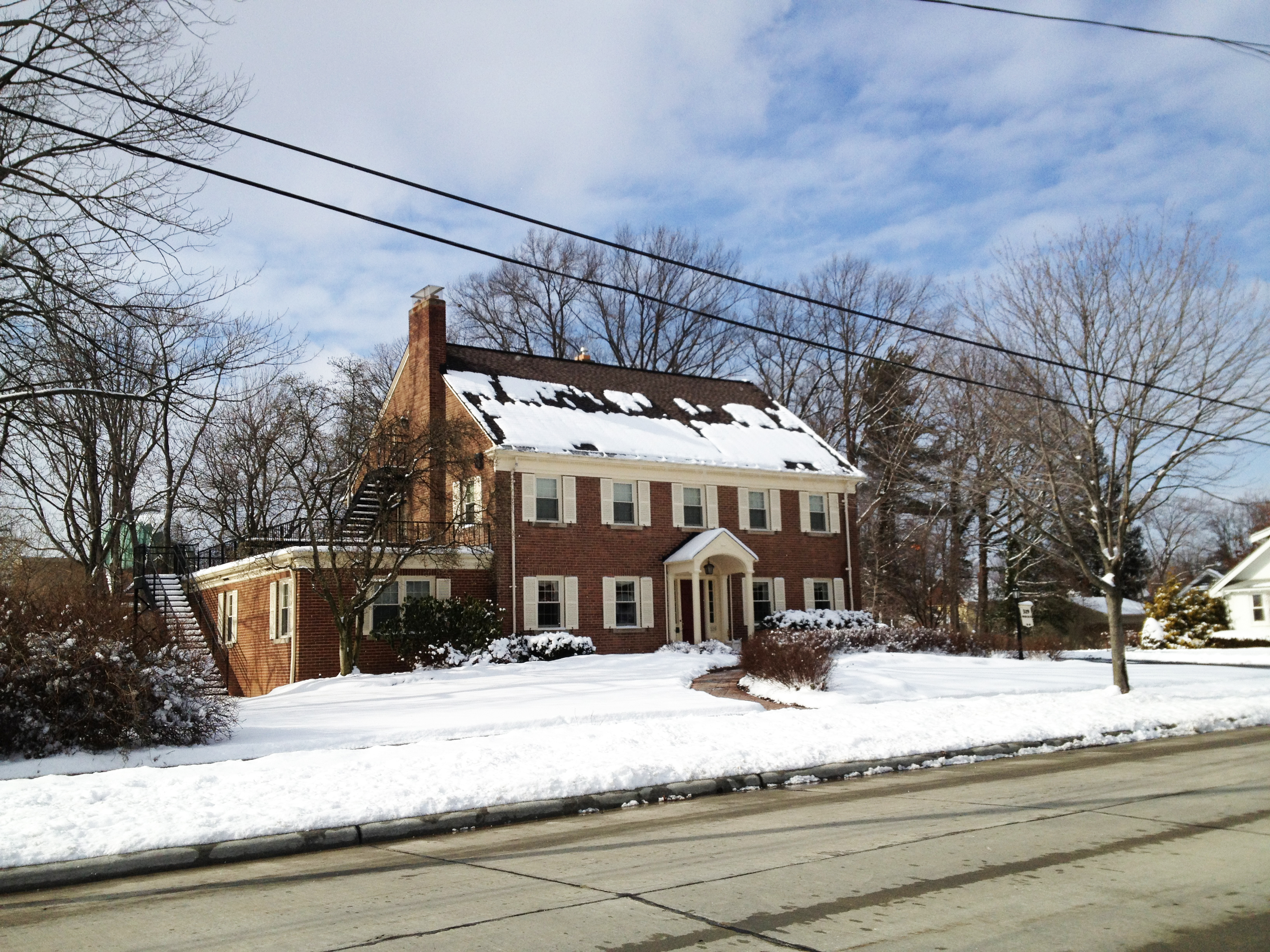
The President's House, built in 1935, has housed numerous BW presidents.

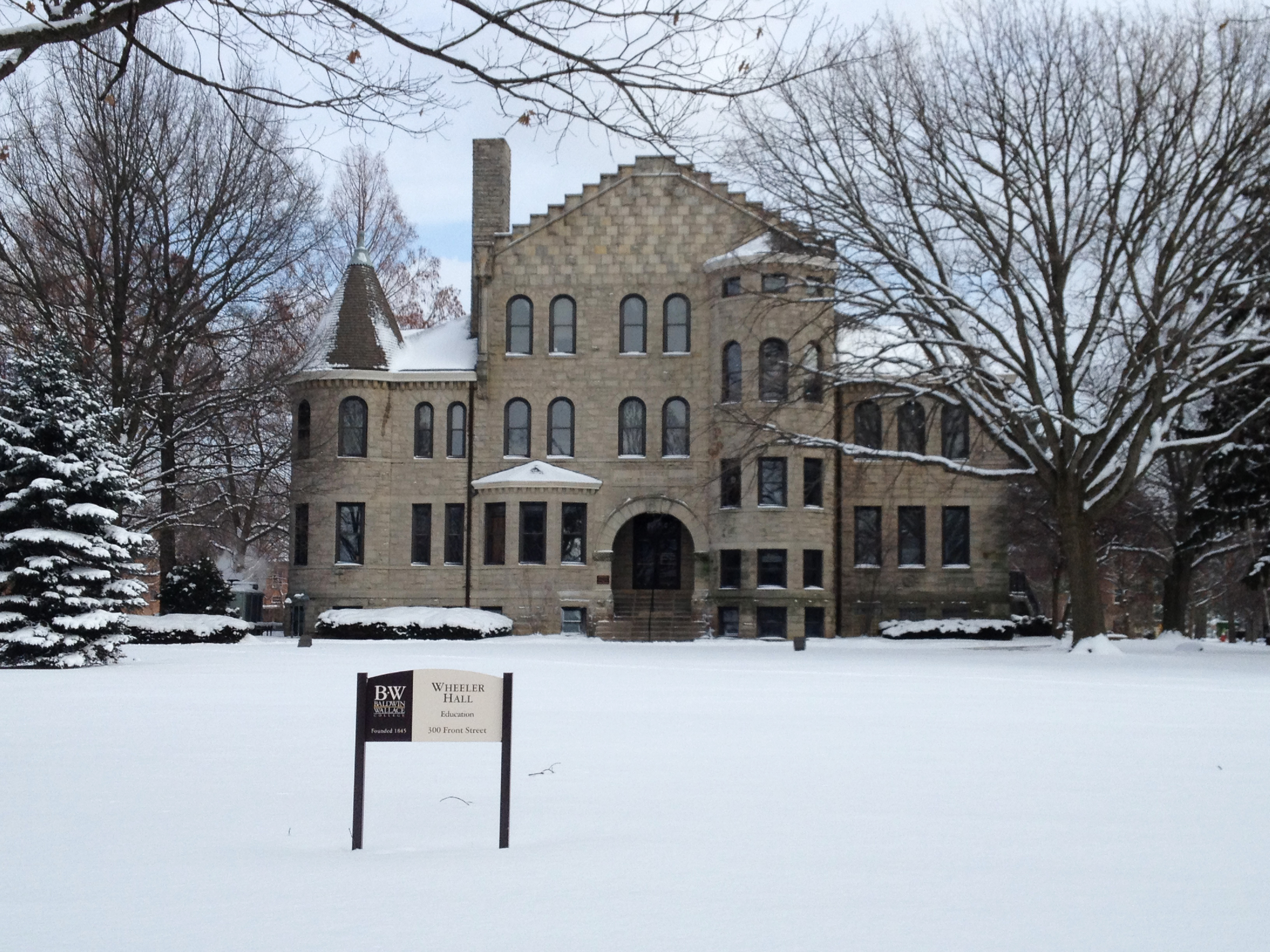
Wheeler Hall, named after President John Wheeler

The following is a complete list of presidents of Baldwin Wallace University. This list includes previous presidents under the school's past names Baldwin–Wallace College, Baldwin University, German Wallace College and Baldwin Institute.

== Baldwin Institute ==
#	Name	Term	Notes	References
1	H Dwight	1846–1855	The first principal, named in April 1846	
2	Owen Thornton Reeves	1851–1853	Principal of Baldwin Institute	
3	John Wheeler	1855–1870	Soon after becoming principal, a charter was granted establishing Baldwin University.	

== Baldwin University ==
#	Name	Term	Notes	References
1	John Wheeler	1856–1870	Namesake of a building on the north side of BW's campus, home to the Education Department	
2	Godman William	1870–1875		
3	Aaron Schuyler	1875–1885		
4	Joseph E. Stubbs	1886–1894		
5	Millard F. Warner	1894–1899		
6	Robert M. Freshwater	1899–1902		
7	Glezan A. Reeder	1902–1905		
8	George Blake Rogers	1905–1907		
9	George Foster Collier	1908–1909	Acting President	
10	Robert L. Waggoner	1909–1911		
11	Glezan A. Reeder	1911–1913		

== German Wallace College ==
#	Name	Term	Notes	References
1	William Nast	1864–1893		
2	Karl Riemenschneider	1894–1908	Reimenschneider's son Albert is the founder of the BW Conservatory and BW Bach Festival, the first collegiate Bach festival in the nation.	
3	Edwin Havinghurst	1908–1910		
4	Arthur L. Breslich	1910–1913		

== Baldwin-Wallace College ==
#	Name	Term	Notes	References
1	Arthur Louis Breslich	1913–1918		
2	Albert Boynton Storms	1918–1933		
3	Louis C. Wright	1934–1948		
4	John Lowden Knight	1949–1954		
5	Alfred Bryan Bonds	1955–1981	Namesake of Bonds Hall, which is located on BW's south side campus, and serves as the university's administration building	
6	Neal Malicky	1981–1999	Namesake of Malicky Hall, which is located on BW's north side of campus, and serves as an academic building, as well as housing the Psychology, Sociology, and Political Science departments.	
7	Mark H. Collier	1999–2006	Namesake of "Goals of Enduring Questions: The Mark Collier Lecture Series"	
8	Richard Durst	2006–2012	Namesake of the Durst Welcome Center, which is located on BW's south side of campus and serves as the admissions office	

== Baldwin Wallace University ==
#	Name	Term	Notes	References
1	Robert C. Helmer	2012–2024		
2	Thomas Sutton	2024–2025	Acting President	
3	Lee Fisher	2025–Present		
