= James Wallace (benefactor) =

Irish-American benefactor (1821–1885)

James Wallace (8 April 1821 – 22 July 1885) was an Irish-American benefactor, best known for his major donations that led to the founding of German Wallace College (1864–1913) and the present Baldwin Wallace University.

== Life ==
Wallace was born in Ballinamore, County Leitrim, Ireland and died in Detroit, Wayne County, Michigan, US.

He arrived in the US in 1846. He became a wealthy businessman, operating a stone quarry in Berea, Ohio. In the 1850s, he gave land and money to the Baldwin Institute to fund the education of the local German workforce and establish teaching in German. The German department at the Baldwin Institute subsequently became the German Wallace College in 1866.

Wallace was the third mayor of Berea, Ohio (1853–54), and has been awarded a "Grindstone Heritage Award" by the town.
