= Robert C. Helmer =

American academic

9th President of Baldwin Wallace University
- In office July 1, 2012 – June 30, 2024
- Preceded by: Richard Durst
- Succeeded by: Lee Fisher

Personal details
- Spouse: Linda
- Children: 2
- Education: University of Notre Dame (BA); Marquette University (PhD); University of Toledo (JD)

Robert C. Helmer is an American academic who became the ninth president of Baldwin Wallace University in Berea, Ohio, on July 1, 2012. He served as the first president of Baldwin Wallace University after the school became a university in 2012. Helmer became president after Richard Durst who served since 2006.

In 2024, Helmer announced his retirement, effective June 30th. The University established an Office of the President while the School searches for a new President. Helmer has been temporarily succeeded by Interim President and Provost Dr. Thomas C. Sutton.

Lee Fisher was selected to succeed Helmer.

== Education ==
Helmer earned a Bachelor of Arts degree from the University of Notre Dame, a PhD from Marquette University, and Juris Doctor from the University of Toledo College of Law. His scholarly interests are in early Christian origins and apocalyptic literature.

== Career ==
Helmer has served as president and faculty member at Lourdes University in Sylvania, Ohio, from 2003 to 2012. Helmer started at Lourdes in 1996 as a faculty member and was appointed Vice President for Academic Affairs in 2001. Prior to Lourdes in 1996, Helmer was a teaching fellow and research assistant at Marquette University from 1991 to 1996. As well, an adjunct professor at Indiana University from 1990 to 1991 and Ancilla College from 1987 to 1989.

Helmer has served as a member of the board of trustees of the Higher Learning Commission of the North Central Association of Colleges and Schools, Sylvania Chamber of Commerce, Flower Hospital, United Way of Greater Toledo, the Toledo Symphony, and Imagination Station.

== Personal life ==
He and his wife, Linda, have two daughters, Clare and Abbie, and live in the President’s House on the Baldwin Wallace University campus with their dogs.

Academic offices
Preceded by Richard Durst	President of Baldwin Wallace University; 2012–2024	Succeeded by Lee Fisher
