= Louis C. Wright =

President of Baldwin-Wallace College from 1934-48

Louis C. Wright was the third president of Baldwin-Wallace College in Berea, Ohio, serving from 1934 to 1948. Baldwin-Wallace College became Baldwin Wallace University in 2012.

== Career ==
Wright was president at BW from 1934 to 1948. During his presidency many of the Greek life organizations began to form on the campus.

Academic offices
| Preceded by Albert Boynton Storms | President of Baldwin-Wallace College; 1934–1948 | Succeeded by John Lowden Knight |
