= Christel Marquardt =

American judge

Christel E. Marquardt (born Chicago, Illinois) is a judge on the Kansas Court of Appeals, having served since 1995.

Marquardt received a B.S. in education from Missouri Western State College. After teaching school in Wisconsin, she attended Washburn University School of Law; she received her Juris Doctor in 1974. Marquardt joined the Topeka law firm Cosgrove, Webb & Oman in 1974. In 1986, she moved to Palmer, Marquardt & Snyder. In 1991, she joined the Kansas City firm Levy & Craig, P.C. Three years later, she formed Marquardt & Associates, L.L.C. with her son. She practiced at this firm until her appointment to the court.

Marquardt has three adult sons and six grandchildren.
