= Mark H. Collier =

American academic administrator (died 2022)

7th President of Baldwin Wallace University
- In office 1999–2006
- Preceded by: Neal Malicky
- Succeeded by: Richard Durst

Mark H. Collier (died February 7, 2022) was an American religious scholar and academic administrator who served as the seventh president of Baldwin-Wallace College in Berea, Ohio, from 1999 to 2006.

== Life and career ==
Collier served as minister of the North Olmsted United Methodist Church in North Olmsted, Ohio. He began his career with Baldwin-Wallace College in 1974 as college chaplain and professor of religion. He was appointed associate dean of academics and director of the college's Mission Action Project. In 1981, Collier became dean of the college upon Neal Malicky's elevation to college president. Collier was appointed president of Baldwin-Wallace in 1999, following Malicky's retirement.

During his presidency Collier oversaw the renovation of the BW rec. center, residence halls, and overseeing a campus master plan that has led to many major renovations on campus such as Malicky Hall being built. Malicky Hall combines Baldwin Library and Carnegie Hall with an addition of new classrooms and offices. As well, during this time BW began to expand and renovate residence halls and academic buildings. In addition, the college has purchased existing buildings in the Berea community for academic and student residential use. After 32 years of service, Collier retired from his presidency in June 2006. BW has named a lecture series called "Goals of Enduring Questions: The Mark Collier Lecture Series" after Collier.

Collier was married to Martha Collier for over 50 years. They had three children and six grandchildren. He was an avid fly-fisherman with a deep love for theologian Frederick Buechner's writing.

Collier died on February 7, 2022.

== Notes ==
Academic offices
Preceded by Neal Malicky	President of Baldwin-Wallace College; 1999–2006	Succeeded by Richard Durst
