= Richard Durst =

American academic administrator

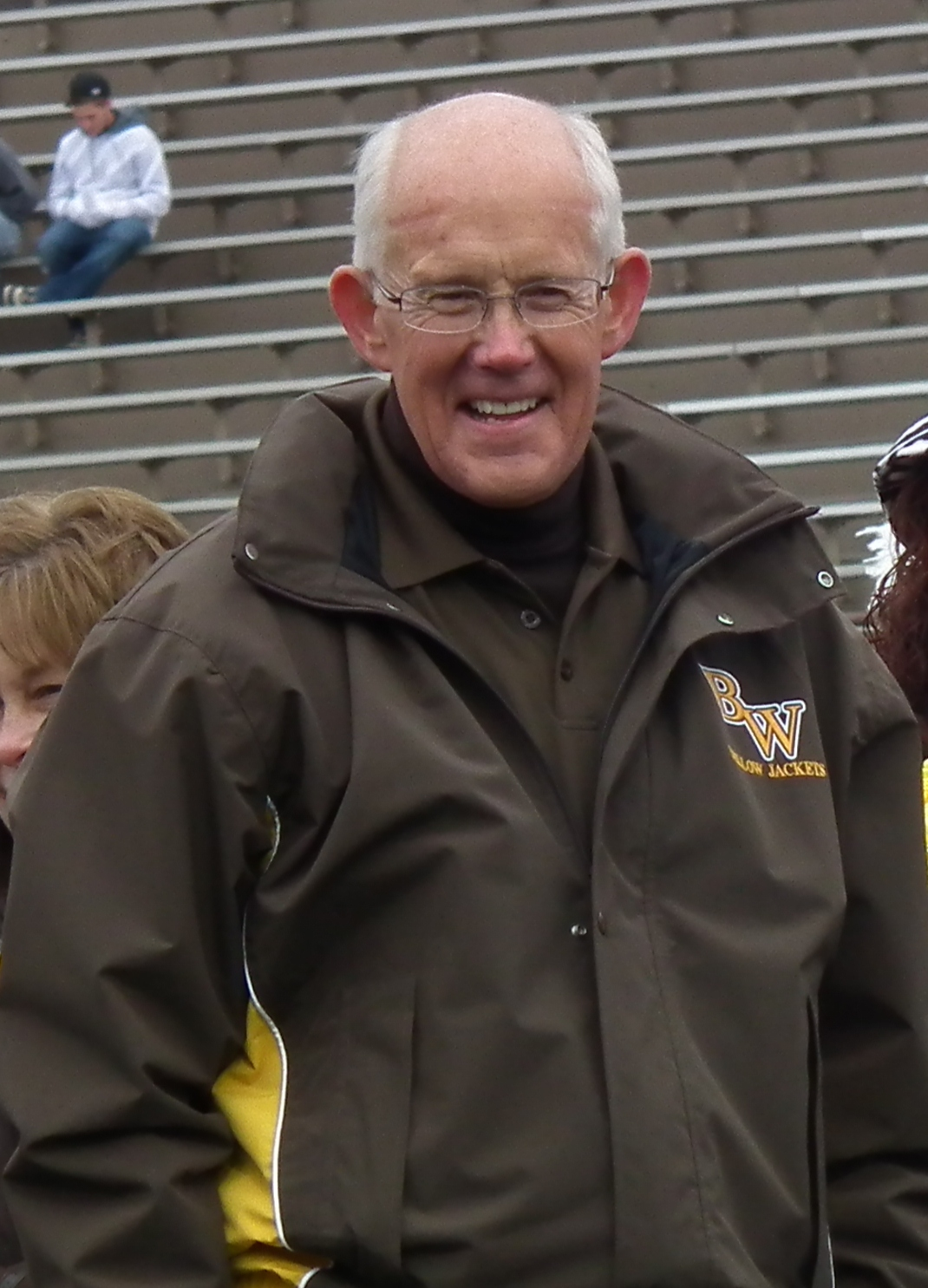

8th President of Baldwin Wallace University
- In office 2006–2012
- Preceded by: Mark H. Collier
- Succeeded by: Robert C. Helmer

Personal details
- Spouse: Karen
- Children: 2
- Education: Missouri Western State University; University of Oklahoma

Richard Wayne Durst is an academic administrator who served as the eighth and last president of Baldwin-Wallace College located in Berea, Ohio. He became president in 2006 and remained until 2012. Durst was replaced by Robert C. Helmer in July 2012 as the school converted to Baldwin Wallace University

== Childhood, education, and family ==
Richard Durst was born in 1945, in Scottsbluff, Nebraska to cattle ranchers Wayne and Pearle Jenson Durst. His parents had a cattle ranch in Harrisburg, Nebraska. Richard spent most of his childhood living with his grandparents in Kansas City, Missouri. Richard Durst served four years in the US Navy during the Vietnam War. He is a graduate of Missouri Western State University and holds a Master of Fine Arts degree from the University of Oklahoma in Scenic Design for Theatre. He and his wife, Karen, were married in 1974 in Norman, Oklahoma. He is the father of two: Amanda Durst and Derek Durst.

== Career ==
Before assuming the Presidency of Baldwin-Wallace College, Durst was Dean of the College of Arts and Architecture and executive director of University Arts Services at the Pennsylvania State University (2000–2006). Prior to that, he was Dean of the Hixson–Lied College of Fine and Performing Arts (1996–2000) and Special Assistant to the Chancellor (1997–2000) at the University of Nebraska–Lincoln. Durst served as Dean of the School of Fine Arts at the University of Minnesota, Duluth from 1989 to 1996, where he was full professor and then department chair before that. Additionally, Durst has served as executive director of the International Council of Fine Arts Deans (ICFAD); he is a Past President of both the United States Institute for Theatre Technology (USITT) and the International Organization of Scenographers, Theatre Architects and Technicians (OISTAT), whose world headquarters are in Amsterdam, Netherlands. In March 2011 Durst announced his intention to retire in May 2012. In 2012, Durst retired as president During Durst's presidency, Durst oversaw the early stages of the school's conversion to a university. In the fall of 2011 a task force was developed by BW President Dick Durst. On February 11, 2012, it was announced Baldwin–Wallace College will become Baldwin Wallace University after approval by the BW Board of Trustees. The name would become effective on July 1 of 2012 with complete implementation by the end of 2012. In addition to the new university designation, seal, and logo "B-W" will drop the hyphen in its name.

Academic offices
Preceded by Mark H. Collier	President of Baldwin Wallace University; 2006–2012	Succeeded by Robert C. Helmer
