= John Lowden Knight =

John Lowden Knight (November 2, 1915 – July 21, 2001) was a professor, university administrator, and a Methodist theologian. He was President of Nebraska Wesleyan University, Lincoln, Nebraska; the fourth president of Baldwin-Wallace College, Berea, Ohio; and the eighth president of the Wesley Theological Seminary, in Washington, D.C..

== Education ==
Knight was born in Beverly, New Jersey on November 2, 1915. He graduated the public schools of Beverly and Burlington City in 1933. He received full tuition to Drew University, where he majored in Biblical Literature, graduating cum laude in 1939. He then attended Boston University, where he earned his A.M in 1941 and his S.T.B. (M.Div) in 1942. World War II prevented Knight from studying overseas, so he began graduate studies at Vanderbilt University Divinity School, earning his M.A. He was prepared to enter the University of Chicago School of Divinity for his PhD, but opted for his first academic appointment at Willamette University.

== Early career ==
Faculty shortages at Willamette offered Knight the chance to become a college chaplain at a young age. He moved up quickly at Willamette, as he was named Assistant to the President following successes in planning the Annual Conference of the Methodist Episcopal Church. He also served as a professor, teaching courses in Bible History, and in 1946, summer courses at the Iliff School of Theology in Denver.

== College administrator ==
Knight served three years as President of the Nebraska Wesleyan University in Lincoln. Knight's time at Nebraska showed marked growth and development of the institution. He became president of Baldwin-Wallace College in Berea, Ohio in 1949.

== Ministry ==
- In 1954, Knight became the senior pastor of the Trinity Methodist Church of Columbus, Ohio. Following his seven years at Trinity, he moved to assume the responsibilities of senior pastor of the First United Methodist Church of Syracuse, New York.

== Return to academia ==
Knight became the president of the Wesley Theological Seminary in Washington, D.C., in 1967. He served the seminary for fifteen years as president.

== Sources ==
- "John Lowden Knight" "Brief Autobiographies and Reflections of the Retired Professors of Wesley Theological Seminary", et al. 1990, by John Lowden Knight.

Academic offices
Preceded by Louis C. Wright	President of Baldwin-Wallace College; 1949–1954	Succeeded by Alfred Bryan Bonds
