= Arthur Louis Breslich =

Professor, university administrator and theologian

Arthur Louis Breslich (May 8, 1873 – June 17, 1924) was a professor, university administrator, and a German Methodist theologian. He was President of German Wallace College, Berea, Ohio; and the first president of Baldwin-Wallace College in Berea.

== Early life and education ==
Little is known about Arthur Breslich's childhood or late career. Breslich was born in Insterburg, East Prussia in 1873.In his early youth he attended the Gymnasium in his home town, and in addition to this he learned the watchmaker trade under the supervision of his father. He emigrated to the United States in 1891 and landed in Elgin, Illinois. He studied at German Wallace College in Berea, Ohio, where he earned his A.B. in 1898. He then moved to Wisconsin, where he entered the ministry of the German Methodist Church. Breslich earned his Ph.D. in Hebrew and Hellenistic Greek from the University of Wisconsin–Madison in 1904, having been a fellow and later a professor of Greek at UW.

== Career ==
After his time as a professor, Breslich entered the ministry again, as minister of the German Methodist Church of Madison, Wisconsin, in 1906. In 1911, Breslich was offered the presidency of his alma mater, German Wallace College. He oversaw the merger of Baldwin University and German Wallace College in 1913, and subsequently became the first president of Baldwin-Wallace College.

== Tenure at Baldwin-Wallace College ==
Breslich enjoyed a relatively calm expansion of the new college, overseeing the construction of the Music Building (now Kulas Hall). He worked hard to establish a common campus out of the predominantly German Wallace south campus and the Baldwin University north campus. His wife brought many of the campus traditions and fight songs of the University of Wisconsin–Madison to the new campus, many of which lasted until the mid-20th century.

== Departure and return to academia ==
Breslich was the victim of an anti-German witch hunt in late 1917 due to his desire to have students sing Christmas carols in German. This led to a committee being formed to decide whether or not the president could be considered 'pro-German'. Although the results were that president Breslich was not 'pro-German' he was forced to resign due to heavy pressure placed upon the committee by both students and Berea citizens.

Breslich left the Berea campus both shamed and bewildered by the events that led to his ouster. He moved back to Wisconsin, where he began work as executive secretary for the Biblical Alliance, an organization he co-founded with UW professor W.H. Williams. It was there that Breslich spent the remainder of his career, editing and contributing to biblical definitions in the International Standard Bible Encyclopedia.

Breslich died in his home in Milwaukee in 1924 at the age of 51. He had three daughters, Ruth, Eunice and Miriam. A small plaque was placed on Baldwin- Wallace's memorial wall honoring their first, and misunderstood president.

== Sources ==
- University of Wisconsin–Madison, (1904–1924) The Badger and Alumni Magazine

Academic offices
New title	President of Baldwin-Wallace College; 1913–1918	Succeeded by Albert Boynton Storms
