= Tim Houlne =

American businessman and author

Timothy Michael Houlne
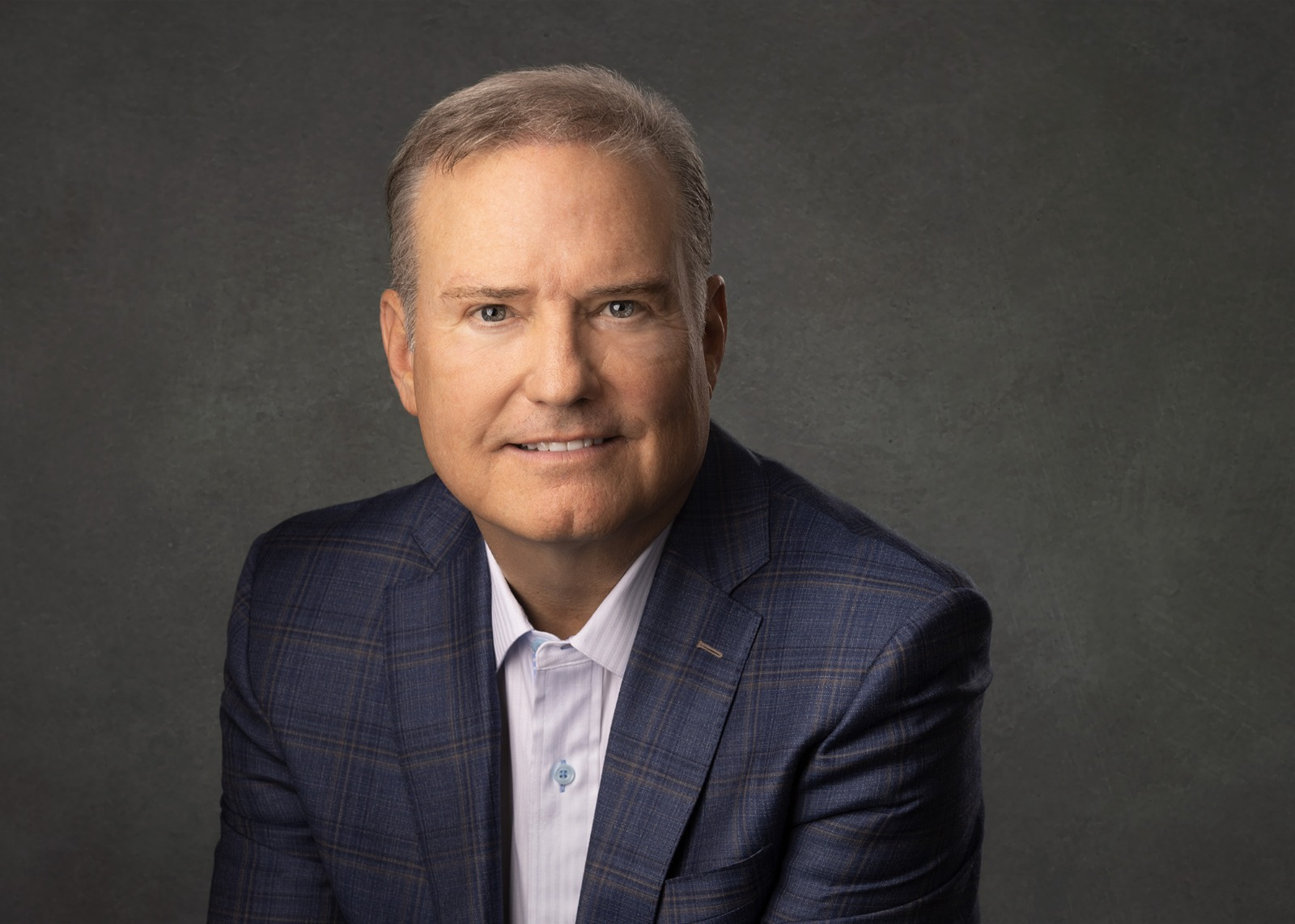
- Tim Houlne in 2024
- Born: United States
- Other name: Tim Houlne
- Occupations: Business executive, entrepreneur, and author
- Known for: His work in outsourcing of customer service

Tim Houlne is an American business executive, entrepreneur, and author known for his work in outsourcing and homeshoring, remote working, and artificial intelligence (AI) in customer service.

He is the founder and CEO of Humach, a company that uses human agents and AI in customer experience solutions. Previously, he was co-founder and CEO of Working Solutions, a virtual contact center company in the United States.

== Early life and education ==
Houlne graduated from Missouri Western State University (MWSU) in 1986 with a bachelor's degree in business administration and from the University of Texas in Dallas with an MBA.

== Career ==
In 1998, Houlne co-founded Working Solutions, a Plano, Texas-based U.S. outsourcing company that provides customer service using remote, home-based agents. As CEO, he oversaw the development of a virtual workforce model that routes service calls to either domestic or offshore agents, according to client needs and service requirements.

In 2015, Houlne founded Humach, a customer experience outsourcing provider that uses human service agents with AI-based digital agents. The company derives its name from the combination of services provided by humans and machines. Its clients include Amazon, Carfax and McDonald's. The company acquired InfiniteAI in 2020, and Markets EQ in 2025.

== Recognition ==
In 2013, Houlne was named a finalist for the Ernst & Young Entrepreneur of the Year Award (Southwest Region).

In 2024, MWSU and North Central Missouri College renamed the Convergent Technology Alliance Center to the Houlne Center for Convergent Technology. The 20,000 square-foot learning laboratory provides training and applied education experiences in industries such as AI, cybersecurity, manufacturing and construction, and service technologies.

== Works ==
He is the co-author of several books focused on the evolution of work, the gig economy, and the influence of AI in customer-facing roles.

- The New World of Work: From the Cube to the Cloud (2013) ISBN 0982562276 OCLC 813933360
- The New World of Work, Second Edition: The Cube, the Cloud and What's Next (2023) ISBN 9781642258318 OCLC 1389815847
- The Intelligent Workforce: How Humans & Machines Will Co-Create a Better Future (2024) ISBN 9798887501604 OCLC 1439598569
