= Neal Malicky =

American academic administrator (1934–2024)

Neal Malicky (September 14, 1934 – November 22, 2024) was an American academic administrator served as the sixth president of Baldwin-Wallace College (now Baldwin Wallace University) in Berea, Ohio from 1981 to 1999. Malicky was succeeded by Mark H. Collier in 1999. A building on the north side of BW's campus bears Malicky's name. The Neal Malicky Center for the Social Sciences was named in his honor in 2001.

== Early childhood and education ==
Malicky was born in Sour Lake, Texas, to George and Ethel (née Reed) Malicky. His younger sister was the opera singer Joyce Castle. His father was a baseball player who played for Philadelphia Athletics until becoming a pitcher for the Beaumont Exporters. The Malicky family lived in Beaumont, Texas from 1931 until c. 1950 when they moved to Kansas. The family settled in Baldwin City, a community named for the founder of Baldwin-Wallace College, John Baldwin.

Malicky graduated from Baker University in Baldwin City, and earned a theological degree from Southern Methodist University in Dallas, Texas. While on the faculty at Drew University, Malicky earned his Ph.D. in international affairs from Columbia University in 1968. He did additional study at Harvard University.

== Career ==
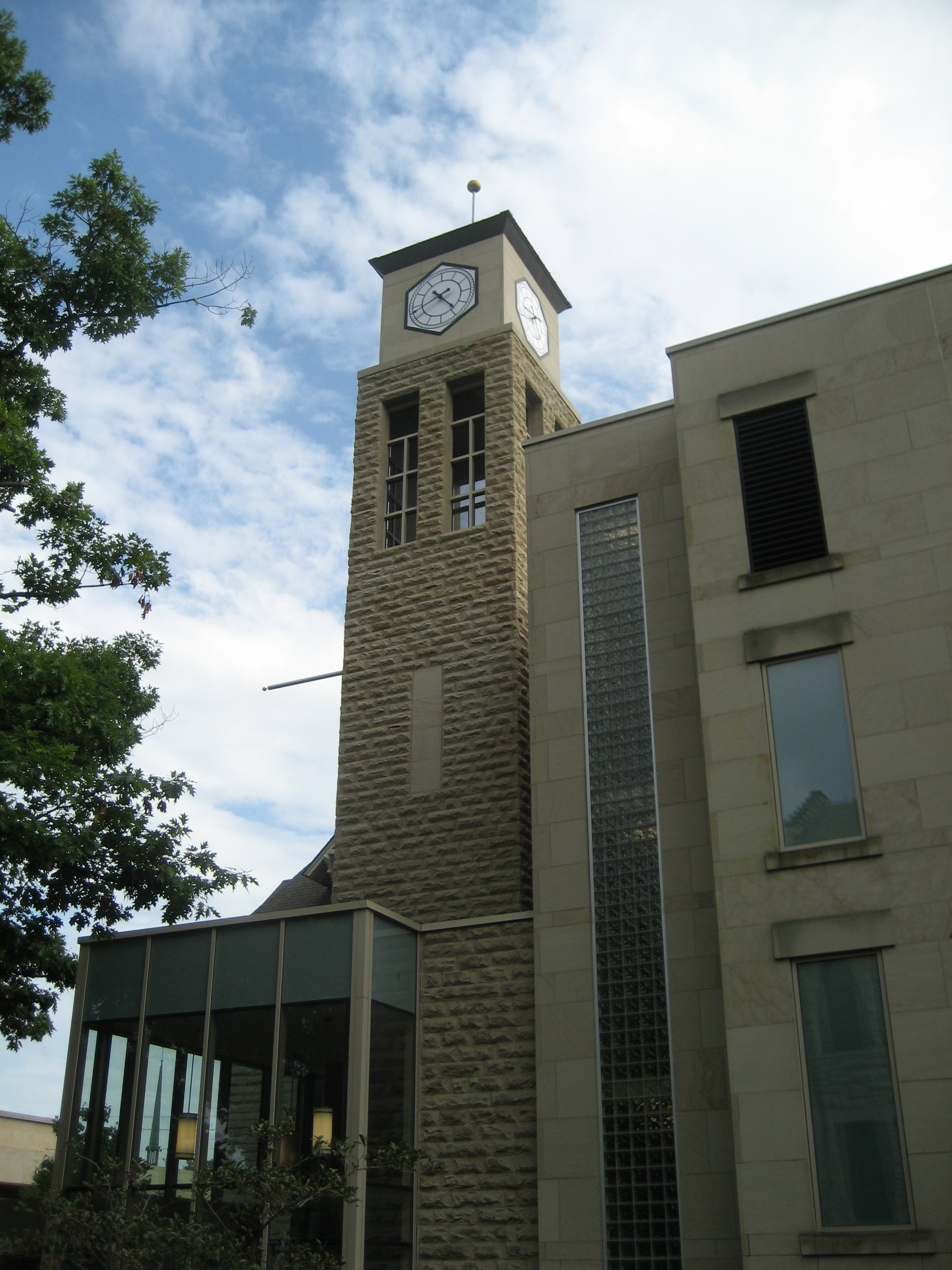
Malicky Hall on BW's North Campus

In 1969, Malicky was appointed dean of the college at Baker University. He later served as acting president of Baker in 1974. Malicky became dean of academic affairs of Baldwin-Wallace College in 1975. Upon the retirement of President Alfred Bryan Bonds in 1981, Malicky was appointed the sixth president of Baldwin-Wallace College. Malicky served 18 years as president of Baldwin-Wallace College. During his term, he oversaw a growth in the endowment of the college from 15 million to over 100 million dollars. Malicky coined the new college motto, "Quality Education with a Personal Touch", and focused faculty to teach over publishing or scholarly work.

Malicky was awarded a Doctor of Humane Letters from Baldwin-Wallace College in 1999, and named president emeritus and chancellor, an honor only bestowed to his predecessor, Alfred Bryan Bonds. The Neal Malicky Center for the Social Sciences was named in his honor in 2001. During the 1990s BW acquired Bagley Hall which was originally owned by the Cleveland Browns and was used as the teams summer training facility. BW acquired the former practice field and office building when the team was moved to Baltimore to become the Baltimore Ravens. Upon the Cleveland Browns returning to Cleveland a new training facility was built in Berea close to the BW campus. As well, Carmel Center for Living and Learning (referred to as Carmel Hall) opened. In 1998, Baldwin Wallace switched from the quarters system to semesters. With this switch the campus tradition "May Day" ceased to exist. May Day was celebration in the spring which even had a May Queen every year. With the school year ending now in early May, April Reign began. Malicky died on November 22, 2024, at the age of 90.

== Malicky Hall ==
Following Malicky's presidency, Mark Collier (his successor), oversaw building of Malicky hall, named after Neal Malicky. Malicky Hall combines Baldwin Library and Carnegie Hall with an addition of new classrooms and offices. The Neal Malicky Center for the Social Sciences was named in his honor in 2001.

== Notes ==
Academic offices
Preceded by Alfred Bryan Bonds	President of Baldwin-Wallace College; 1981–1999	Succeeded by Mark H. Collier
