= Alfred Bryan Bonds =

American academic (1913–1989)

5th President of Baldwin–Wallace College
- In office 1955–1981
- Preceded by: John Lowden Knight
- Succeeded by: Neal Malicky

Personal details
- Born: November 3, 1913; Monroe County, Arkansas, U.S.
- Died: September 7, 1989 (aged 75)
- Spouse: Georgianna
- Education: Henderson State College (AB); Louisiana State University (MA); University of North Carolina at Chapel Hill
- Profession: Public servant, educator, college administrator

Military service
- Allegiance: United States
- Branch/service: United States Navy
- Rank: Lieutenant
- Battles/wars: World War II

Alfred Bryan Bonds (November 3, 1913 – September 7, 1989) was an American public servant, educator, and college administrator. He served as the fifth president of Baldwin-Wallace College (now Baldwin Wallace University) in Berea, Ohio, from 1955 to 1981. He succeeded Rev. John Lowden Knight. A building bears his name on the BW campus and serves as the universities' administration building.

== Early childhood and education ==
Alfred Bryan Bonds was born November 3, 1913, in Monroe County, Arkansas. Bonds began his education at Henderson State College, where he earned his A.B in 1935. He then earned a M.A. in English from Louisiana State University in 1936. Post graduate work continued at Louisiana State University, and the University of North Carolina at Chapel Hill in 1940. He married his wife, Georgianna.

== Career ==
Bonds began his career as assistant to the Dean while at Louisiana State, and a research project coordinator at Tulane University. Bonds served in World War II, first as an administrator under the War Manpower Commission before enlisting. Bonds served in the U.S. Navy as a Lieutenant (s.g) until 1946.

== Political appointments and career ==
Bonds served in several White House political appointments under the administration of President Harry S. Truman, including Assistant Executive Secretary of the President's Commission on Higher Education, Chief of Reeducation and Training under the Department of Labor, Education Consultant to UNESCO, and training director of the Atomic Energy Commission.

Beyond this, Bonds served as the State Commissioner of Education for Arkansas and as Dwight D. Eisenhower's Chief of the U.S. Educational Mission to Egypt. Bonds accepted the position of President of Baldwin-Wallace College from Cairo, in 1955. He succeeded Rev. John Lowden Knight.

== Baldwin–Wallace College ==
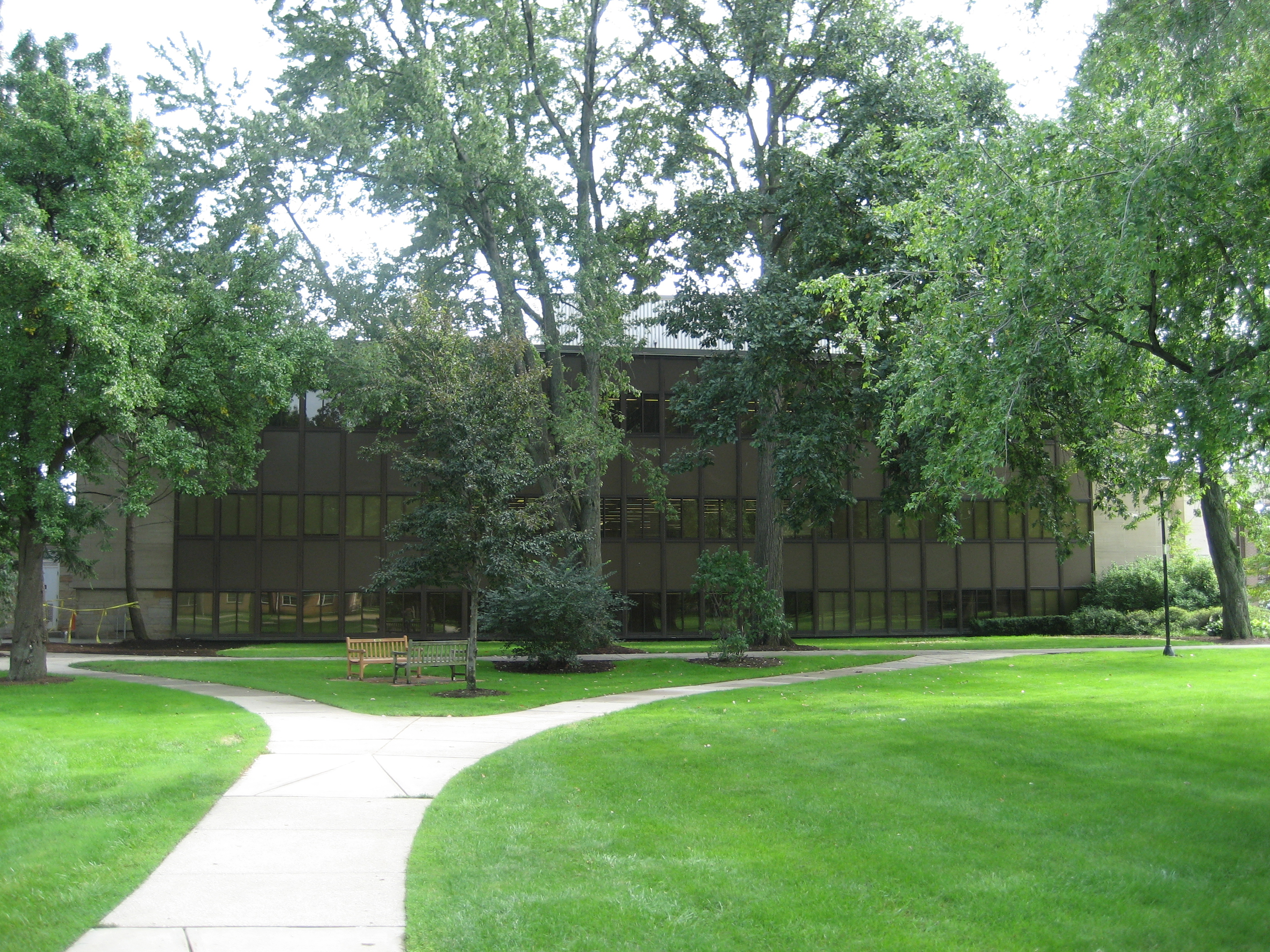
Ritter Library built during the Bonds expansion

Bonds was a strong administrator and fundraiser. Bonds oversaw the construction over a dozen buildings at Baldwin–Wallace and a doubling of the college's enrollment. In 1957, Dr. Bonds initiated a 15-year development program for Baldwin-Wallace, which resulted in increasing student enrollment by 85 per cent and added Ritter Library (1958), five residence halls (Findley, North, Hamilton Apartments, Ernsthausen hall-1961, Heritage Hall-1960's), the science complex (Wiker Hall 1960's), the Health Center, Finnie Stadium, the College Union (1965), the Art and Drama Center (Kliest 1972), the Jacob Kamm School of Business building and the Administration building that was named after him. Bonds oversaw the construction of fifteen buildings during his time at BW during his 26-year tenure.

During the presidency of Alfred Bryan Bonds, the Alumni Wall (located behind North hall) was created, and still used today to recognize Alumni who have contributed to the development of the campus.

Lastly, Bonds's contributions to Baldwin-Wallace included designing the campus in the colonial style of architecture, and commissioning friend Felix de Weldon to adorn the student union in bas-relief sculptures. Bonds served with Weldon in WWII.

In 1972, during his 17th year as president of Baldwin-Wallace College, Dr. Alfred Bryan Bonds, Jr. was named Berea's Outstanding Citizen of the Year. Upon retirement, Bonds sat on numerous hospital and library boards around the greater Cleveland area. Dr. Bonds is listed in "Who's Who in America," "Who's Who in the World" and in "Notable Americans" as well. Bonds received accolades during his entire life, including four honorary doctorates from Ohio Wesleyan University, Mount Union College, Cleveland–Marshall College of Law, and Baldwin-Wallace College

== Bonds Hall ==
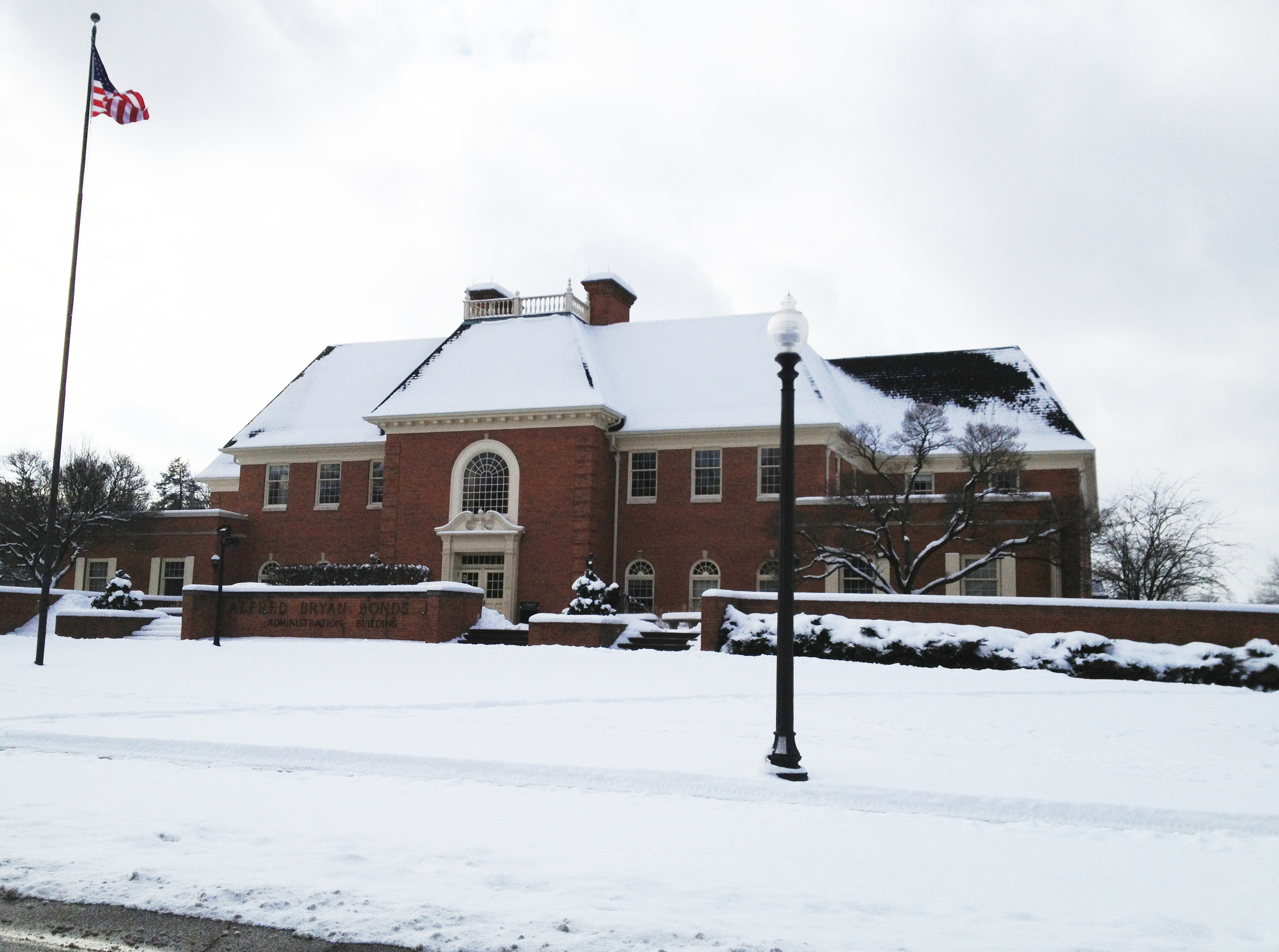
Bonds Hall on BW's south end of campus

Bonds Hall is the administration building on the BW campus and is home to Career Services, the Cashier’s office, Financial Aid, Registration & Records and the president's office.

== Sources ==
- Clary, Norman J. Baldwin-Wallace College. Cradles of Conscience. Ed. John William Oliver, Jr. Kent State University Press, 2003. 39-51

Academic offices
Preceded by John Lowden Knight	President of Baldwin-Wallace College; 1955–1981	Succeeded by Neal Malicky
