= Raymond A. Pearson =

Academic administrator (1873-1939)

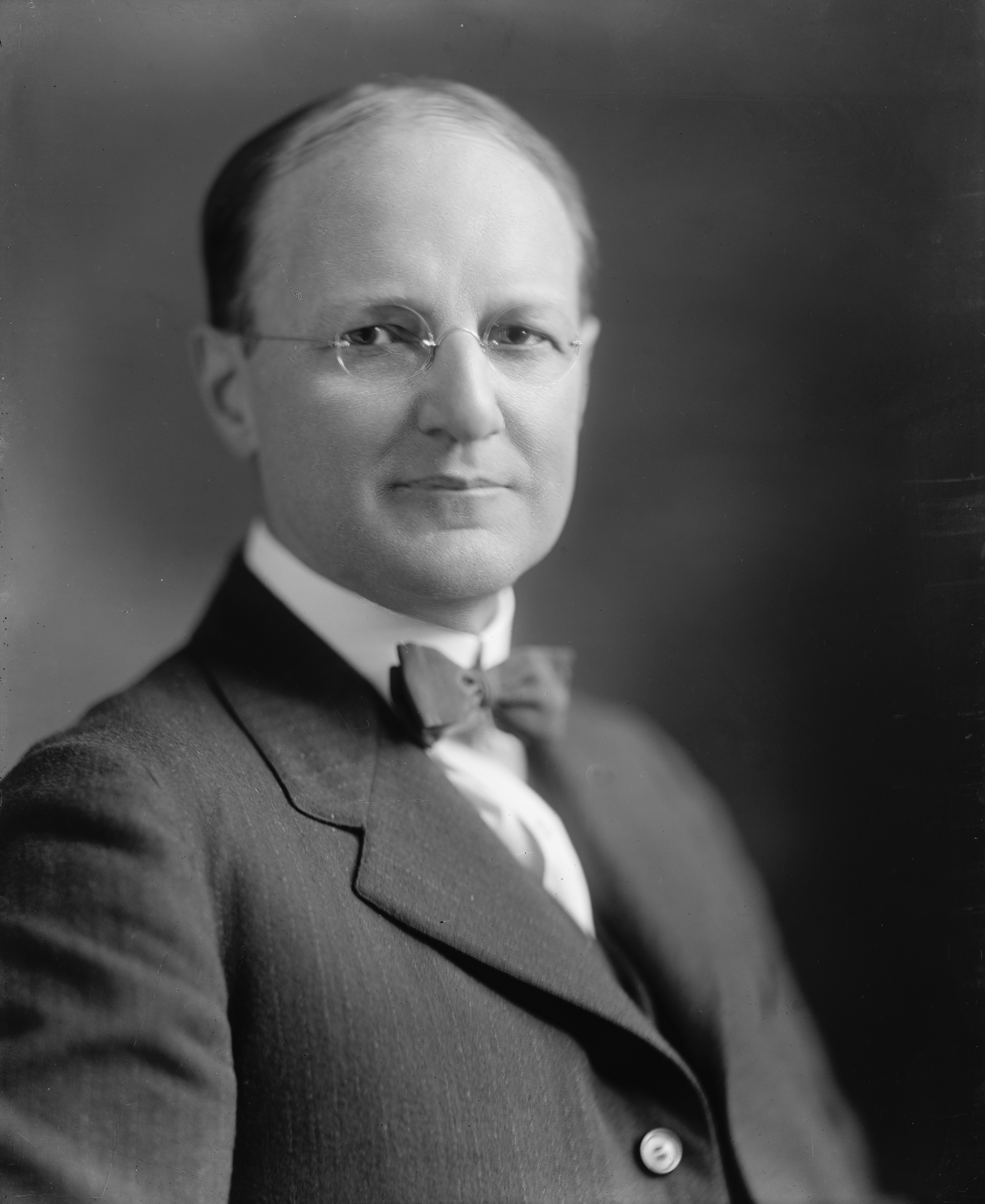
- Pearson circa 1905
- Born: April 9, 1873; Evansville, Indiana
- Died: February 13, 1939 (aged 65); Washington, D.C.
- Education: Cornell University
- Known for: 7th president of Iowa State University; 20th president of University of Maryland, College Park
- Scientific career
- Fields: agricultural administration education academic administration

Raymond Allen Pearson (April 9, 1873 – February 13, 1939) was an American agricultural administrator and educator who served as the 7th president of Iowa State University from 1912 to 1926, the 20th president of University of Maryland, College Park from 1926 to 1935.

== Early life and education ==
He was born April 9, 1873, in Evansville, Indiana to Leonard and Lucy S. Pearson. He attended Cornell University and received his B.S. in 1894 and M.S. in 1899 from Cornell.

== Agricultural Administration Career ==
After his graduation from Cornell University in 1894, he served as assistant chief of the dairy division of the United States Dept. of Agriculture until 1902, in the meanwhile earning his M.S. degree from Cornell University in 1899. From 1908 to 1912, he was the Commissioner of Agriculture for New York. While at Iowa State College he also served as Assistant Secretary of Agriculture during the war emergency period of 1917-18.

== Academic and Academic Administration Career ==
From 1903 to 1908, he was a professor of dairy industry at Cornell University. In 1912, he began his tenure as the 7th president of Iowa State University. During his administration at ISU the campus construction surpassed that of any other era prior to the post-World War II boom and 14 academic buildings in service during the 1970s were constructed during Pearson's term. He promoted the graduate program, broadened extension service; and gave wholehearted support to athletics.

He became the 20th president of University of Maryland, College Park in 1926 and served in that position until 1935. His main contribution to Maryland was a greatly expanded physical plant, both in Baltimore and College Park, with 13 buildings added, as well as additional acreage.
