= Baldwin Wallace University =

Private university in Berea, Ohio, US

Coordinates: 41°22′16″N 81°50′52″W

- Former names: Baldwin Institute (1845–1856); Baldwin University (1856–1913); German Wallace College (1864–1913); Baldwin–Wallace College (1913–2012)
- Type: Private university
- Established: December 20, 1845; 180 years ago
- Academic affiliations: CIC, Space-grant
- Endowment: $177.9 million (2020)
- President: Lee Fisher
- Academic staff: 213 (fall 2024)
- Students: 3,318 (fall 2024)
- Undergraduates: 2,842 (fall 2024)
- Postgraduates: 476 (fall 2024)
- Location: Berea, Ohio, United States
- Campus: Suburban, 120 acres (49 ha)
- Colors: Brown and gold
- Nickname: Yellow Jackets
- Sporting affiliations: NCAA Division III – OAC
- Mascot: Stinger
- Website: www.bw.edu

Baldwin Wallace University (BW) is a private university in Berea, Ohio, United States. Established in 1845 as Baldwin Institute by Methodist businessman and former founder of a utopian community at Berea, Ohio John Baldwin, it merged with nearby German Wallace College in 1913 to become Baldwin-Wallace College. There are two campus sites: Berea, which serves as the main campus, and Corporate College East in Warrensville Heights, Ohio. The university enrolls approximately 3,300 full-time undergraduate and graduate students as of fall 2024. Baldwin Wallace's athletic teams compete as members of NCAA Division III athletics in the Ohio Athletic Conference.

== History ==
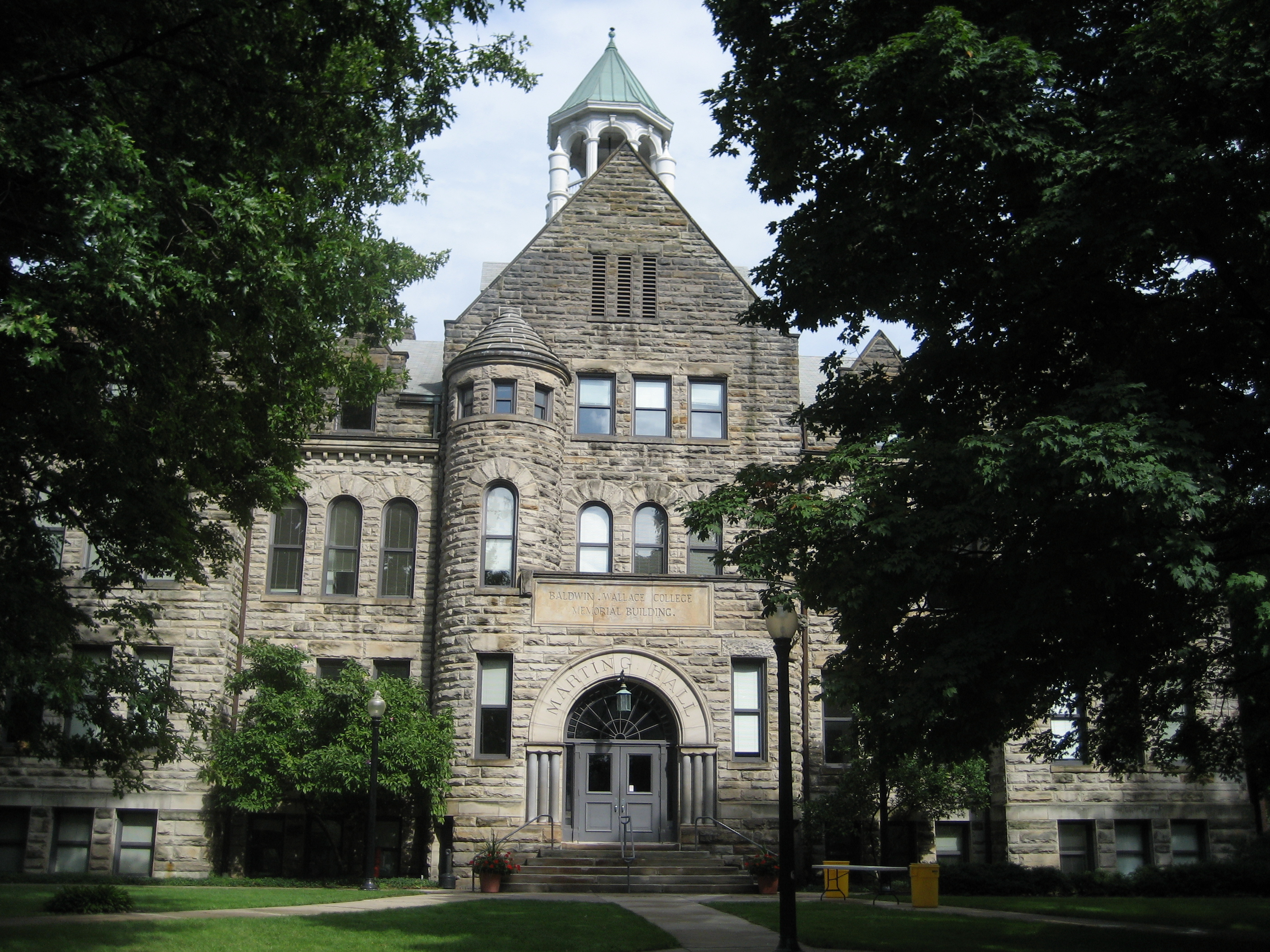
Marting Hall

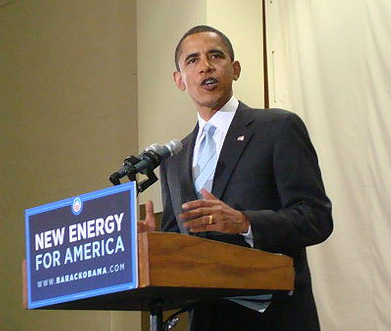
Presidential candidate Barack Obama speaking at BW's Lou Higgins Center in 2008

Both the university and the town of Berea were founded by Methodist settlers from Connecticut. Among early settlers of this area was John Baldwin. He enjoyed early success in the sandstone quarry industry and founded Baldwin Institute in 1845. Baldwin Institute became Baldwin University in 1856. The school accepted students regardless of race or gender.

Jacob Rothweiler, a professor at Baldwin University, named German Wallace College (founded in 1855) after James Wallace. Baldwin University and German Wallace College merged in 1913 to form Baldwin–Wallace College.

During World War II, Baldwin Wallace was one of 131 colleges and universities nationally that took part in the V-12 Navy College Training Program which offered students a path to a Navy commission.

Alfred Bryan Bonds was president in the mid-20th century; Baldwin Wallace grew as a suburban institution. Bonds oversaw the construction of fifteen buildings on campus during his 26-year tenure. Neal Malicky followed him as college president. Mark Collier served as president for seven years.

In the fall of 2011, a task force was developed by BW president Dick Durst. On February 11, 2012, it was announced that Baldwin–Wallace College would become Baldwin Wallace University after approval by the BW Board of Trustees. The name would become effective on July 1, 2012, with complete implementation by the end of 2012. In addition to the new university designation, seal, and logo, "B-W" would drop the hyphen in its name.

The last sitting president prior to Obama to visit BW was Ronald Reagan during George H. W. Bush's 1988 Presidential run. In 2019, BW trustees voted to disaffiliate from the United Methodist Church after 174 years.

Presidents
President	Years
Arthur Louis Breslich	1913–1918
Albert Boynton Storms	1918–1933
Louis C. Wright	1934–1948
John Lowden Knight	1949–1954
Alfred Bryan Bonds	1955–1981
Neal Malicky	1981–1999
Mark H. Collier	1999–2006
Richard Durst	2006–2012
Robert C. Helmer	2012–2024
Lee Fisher	2025–Present
This list does not include acting presidents or any presidents before the two colleges combined in 1913.

== Campus ==
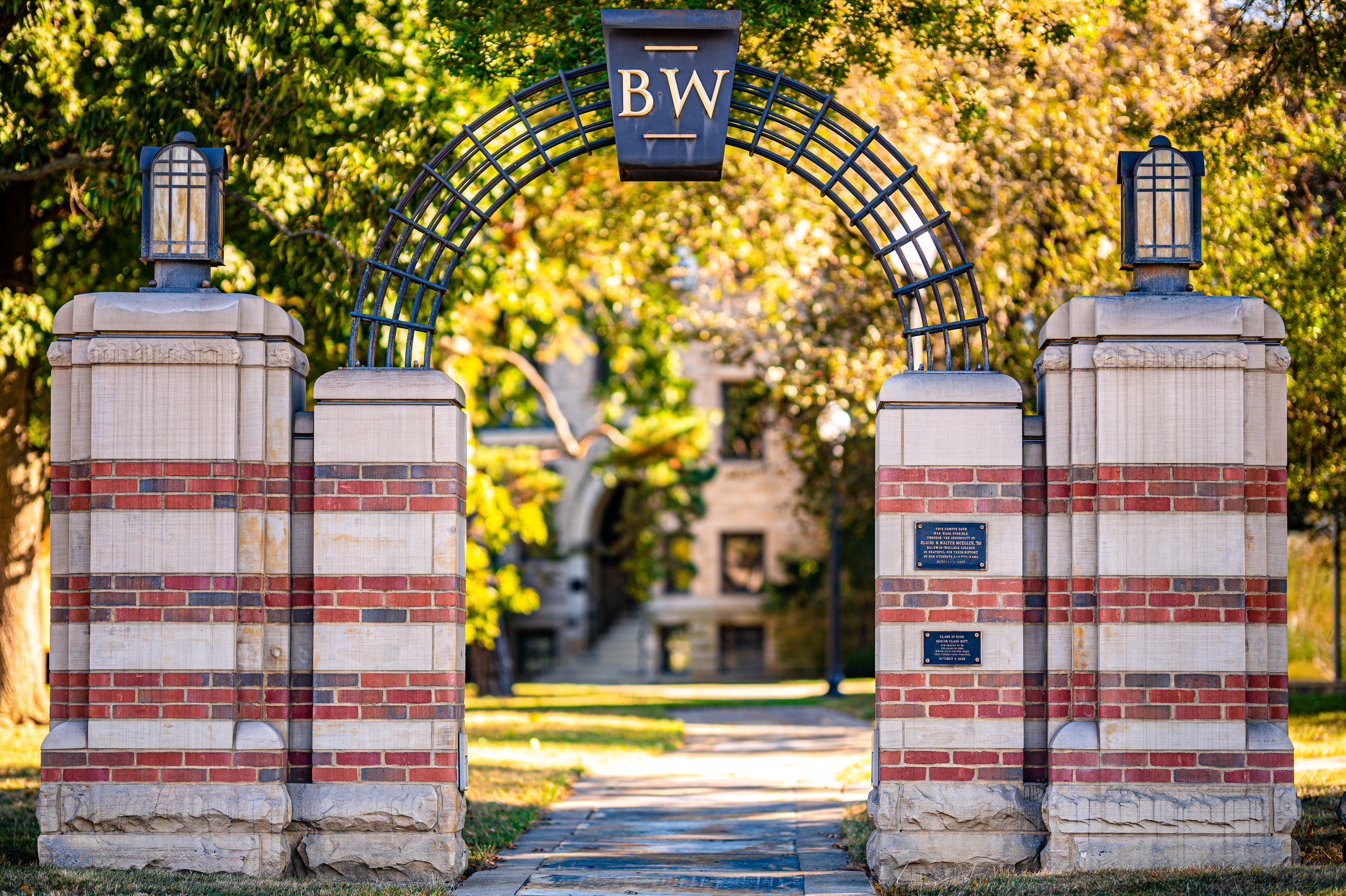
Baldwin Wallace entrance gate

The campus is located in Berea, Ohio, a suburb of Cleveland. The campus is built around land that originally was two separate schools that combined in 1913. The campus itself is located next to Berea-Midpark High School and is integrated into the neighborhoods of Berea.

Two parts of the BW campus are listed on the National Register of Historic Places. The south campus historic district incorporates several buildings in the vicinity of Marting Hall. It combined the former Lyceum Village Square and German Wallace College.

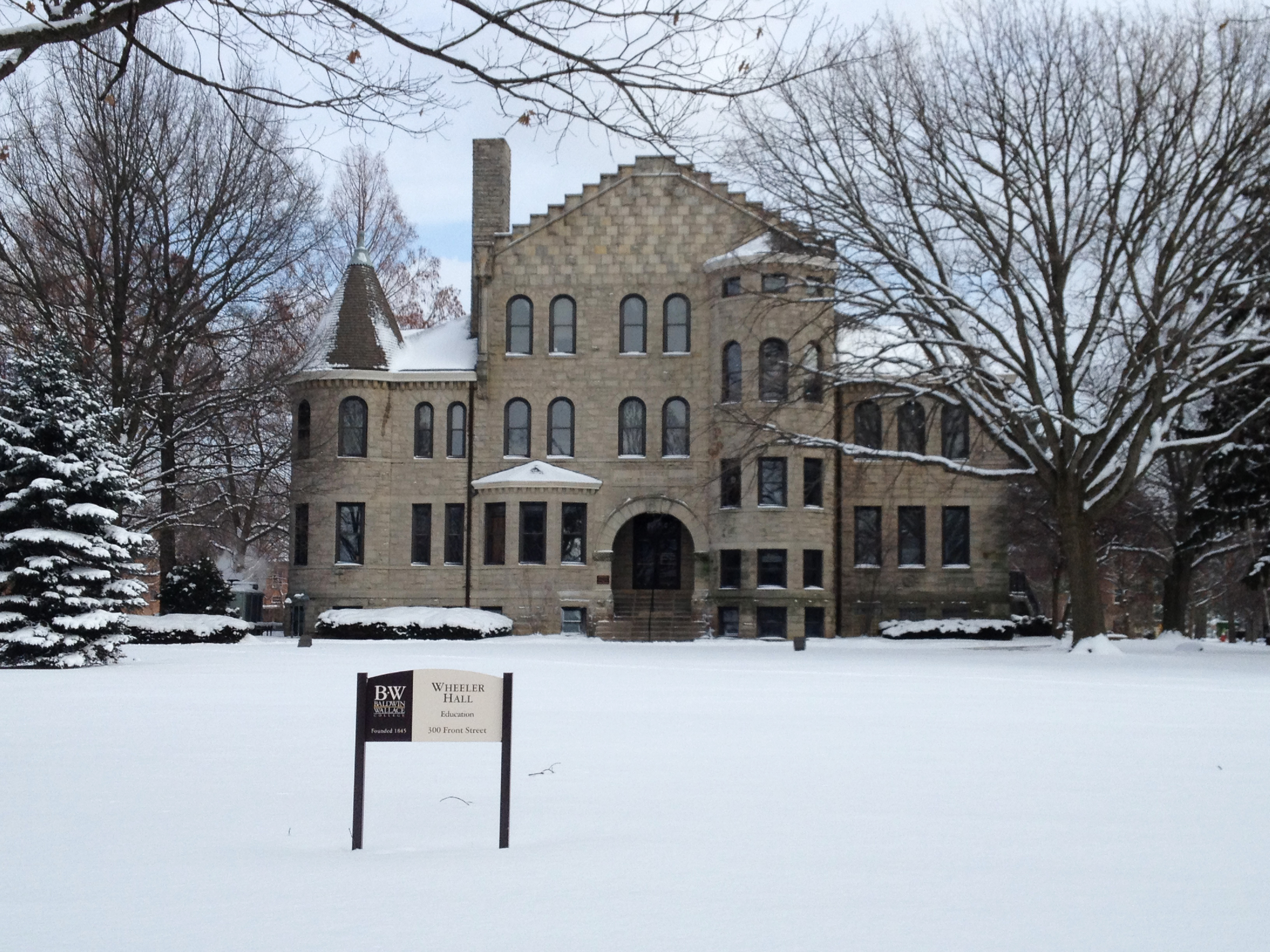
Wheeler Hall

In 2012, BW moved to propose the preservation of several historic buildings on its north campus historic district. The North Campus Historic District The buildings include Baldwin Memorial Library & Carnegie Science Hall, Malicky Center for Social Sciences, Austin E. Knowlton Center, Wheeler Hall, Wilker Hall, Telfer Hall, Ward Hall, Burrell Observatory, the Alumni House/President's House, the Tudor House (Safety and Security), North Hall, Findley Hall, Lang Hall, and Ritter Library.

=== Sustainability ===
In 2005, BW became the first to have a residence hall in Ohio with geo-thermal heating and cooling. Ernsthausen Hall which was originally built in 1961 was renovated in 2005 to use geo-thermal heating and cooling. In the fall of 2008, Baldwin Wallace became the first college in Ohio to offer a bachelor's degree in sustainability. The program was discontinued in 2026, due to budget cuts.

In 2009, BW became the first school in the state to install a wind turbine on its campus. BW also uses kitchen grease from Strosacker Hall's dining facilities for the production of bio-diesel fuel for campus vehicles. In 2012, BW opened Harding House which is a renovated residence hall to become a "sustainability house". The house has an "energy dashboard" that monitors energy consumption and a vegetative roof garden that absorbs rainwater that helps regulate the building's temperature. In addition, Harding House and the Center for Innovation and Growth both have solar panels on their roofs. 63 Beech, 21 Beech, Saylor and Klien Halls will eventually join Ernsthausen & Harding House to also include Geo-thermal heating and cooling.

== Academics ==
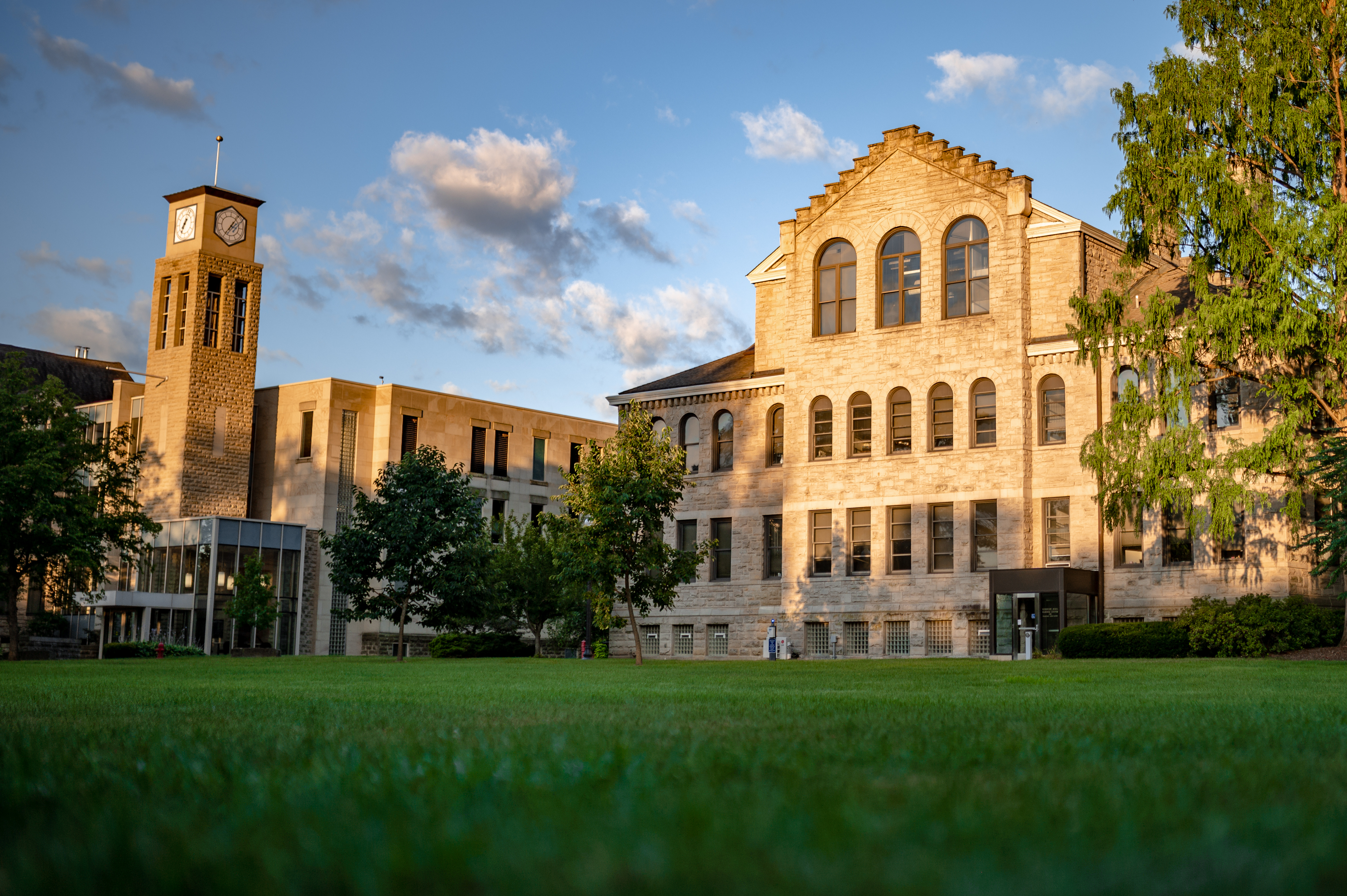
Malicky Center

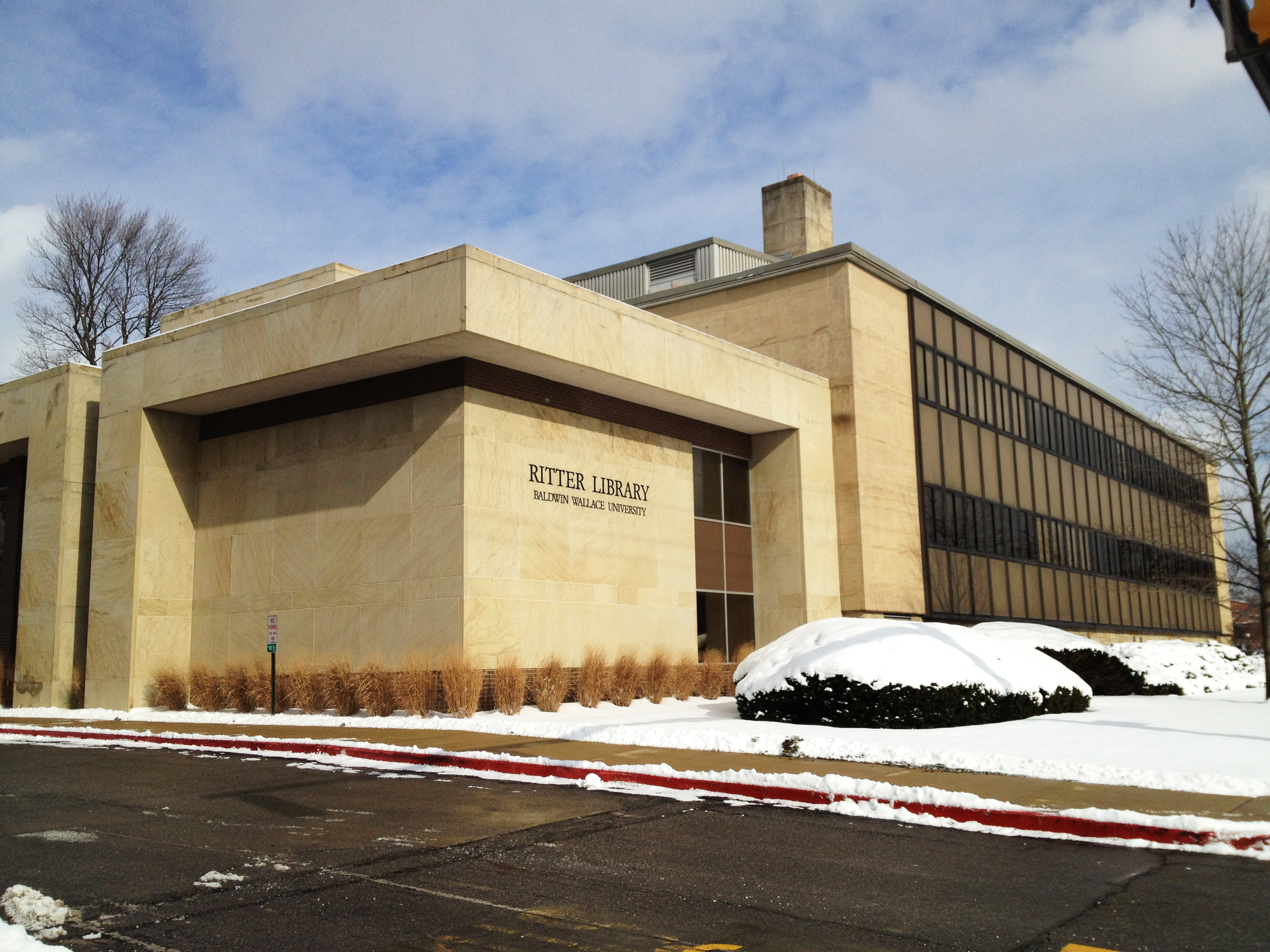
Ritter Library

Baldwin Wallace offers more than 60 majors, as well as several cooperative and pre-professional programs. For undergraduate programs, these majors lead to a Bachelor of Arts, Bachelor of Science, Bachelor of Music, or Bachelor of Science in Nursing. Beyond this, BW offers 6 master's programs that lead to a Master of Arts in Education, Master of Accountancy, or Master of Business Administration. BW offers programs and some courses online. 80% of Baldwin Wallace faculty members doctorates or other terminal degrees.

In the 2025 U.S. News & World Report college rankings, Baldwin Wallace University was ranked tenth out of 165 regional master's universities in the Midwest.

Baldwin Wallace University is organized into five academic schools: the Carmel Boyer School of Business, the School of Humanities, Education, and Social Sciences, the School of Health Sciences, the Conservatory of Performing Arts, and the School of Science and Engineering

=== Conservatory of Performing Arts ===
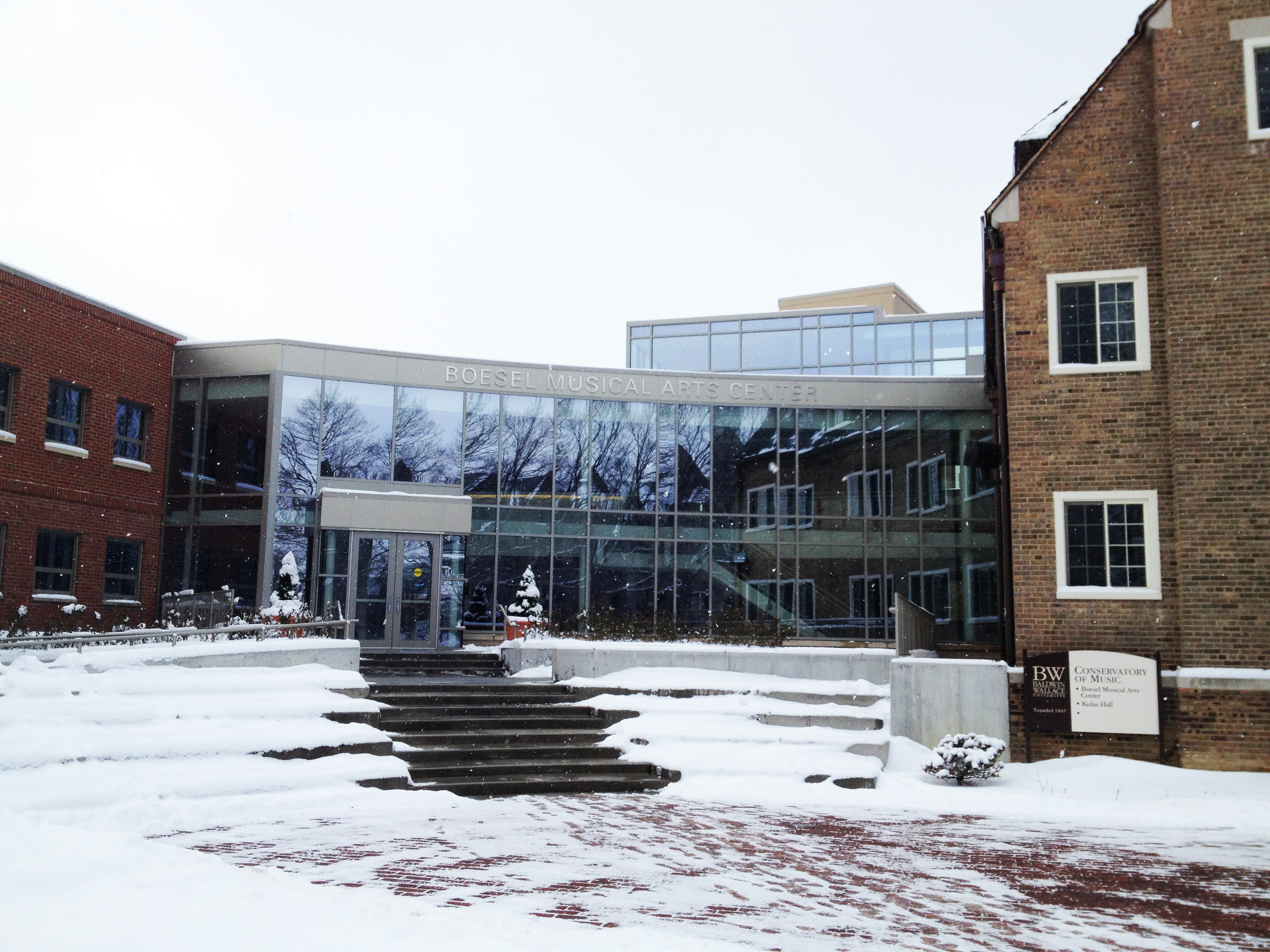
Boesel Musical Center which is connected to several buildings that make up the BW Conservatory of Music

The Baldwin Wallace Conservatory of Performing Arts is part of Baldwin Wallace University. The main building of the conservatory is Kulas Hall. The Conservatory holds the title of home to the oldest collegiate Bach Festival in the nation.

=== BW at Corporate College East ===
Baldwin Wallace offers classes at Corporate College East, a division of Cuyahoga Community College in Warrensville Heights, Ohio. The site focuses on the educational needs of working adults and their employers, enrolling students in undergraduate, graduate and executive education courses.

=== International programs ===
Baldwin Wallace has several international programs in which eligible upperclassmen are able to participate. The college operates several of its own programs plus international student exchange programs at Kansai Gaidai University (Japan), Christ University (India) and Ewha University (Korea), University of the Sunshine Coast (Australia), University of Osnabrück (Germany), York St John University (England), University of Hull (England), Webster University Vienna (Austria), University of Cape Coast (Ghana), Semester at Sea, and many more. BW has faculty-led trips yearly to places such as Europe, Iceland, India, Italy, Ecuador and China. As well, the college offers domestic U.S. - themed trips such as following The Lewis and Clark trail.

=== Outreach programs ===
BW uses programs such as Upward Bound and BW Scholars to reach and serve students from the Cleveland Metropolitan School District. The BW Scholars program was formerly called "The Barbara Byrd-Bennett Program", named after Barbara Byrd-Bennett, who established and funded the program until her departure from the Cleveland Municipal School District. Barbara Byrd-Bennett was the first chief executive officer of the Cleveland Municipal School District. Today the BW Scholars Program continues under funding by the college. BW also utilizes opportunities in the Greater Cleveland for Service-learning. Service-learning is a method of teaching that provides opportunities for students to learn and develop through thoughtfully organized service experience.

== Student life ==
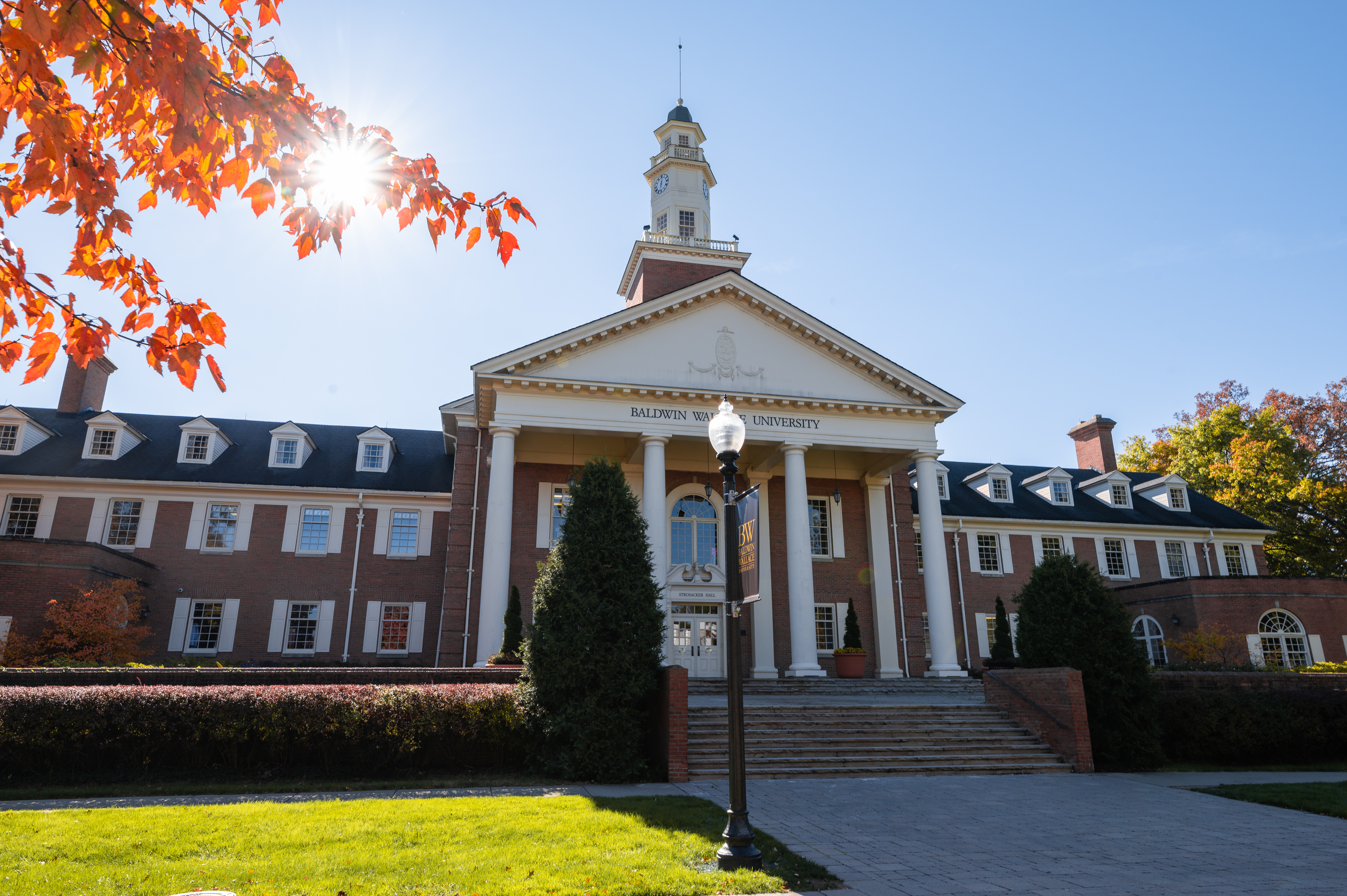
Strosacker Student Union

The Strosacker Student Union houses the campus's largest dining facility and the campus bookstore. The Student Activity Center (SAC) is used for concerts and various student events.

=== Housing ===
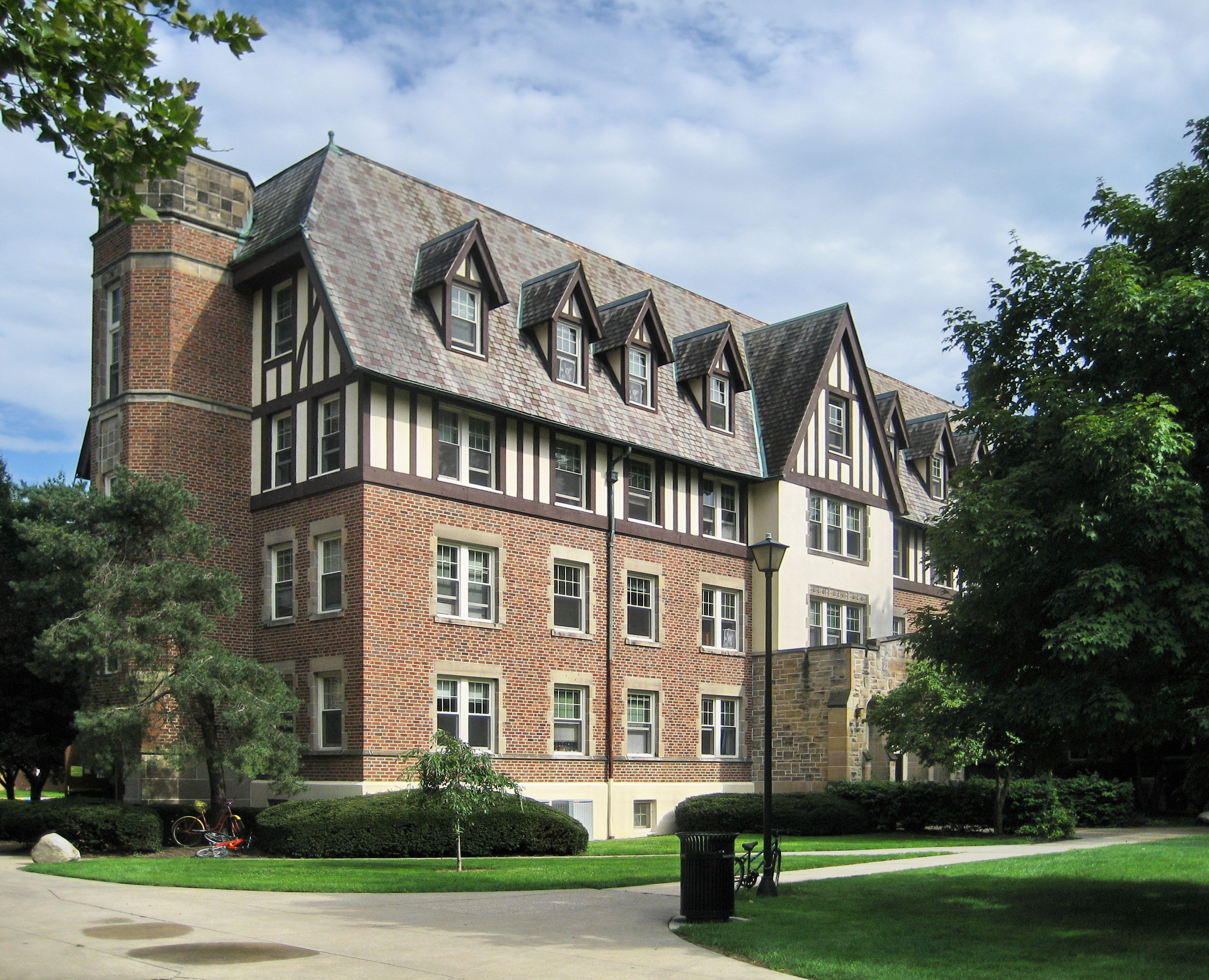
Lang Hall

There are two locations where students are housed. The first is north campus which encompasses halls north of Bagley Road. South campus typically encompasses residence halls that are south of Bagley Road.

Kohler Hall, originally a hospital for Civil War veterans and later for mental patients, is located right beside the conservatory and mostly housed conservatory students, before it was abandoned and slated to be demolished in 2018. However, the demolition for Kohler Hall was delayed due to the COVID-19 pandemic, with no new demolition being set.

=== Student organizations ===
Baldwin Wallace has over 100 clubs and organizations.

The BW campus has four fraternities, four sororities and numerous honoraries. BW fraternities and sororities are all housed in the Ernsthausen residence hall. On-campus fraternity and sorority houses were banned by the City of Berea in the 1960s. The oldest fraternity on campus is Lambda Chi Alpha, which was founded in 1926. The oldest sorority is Alpha Gamma Delta, which was founded in 1940.

=== Campus Media ===
The oldest campus newspaper is the official one, The Exponent. The college has one student-run journal, The Mill (a literary and art magazine).

BW's radio station is WBWC (88.3 FM). Many of the students involved are broadcast majors. WBWC first signed on in 1958 and claims to be the first student-funded and operated radio station in the United States.

== Athletics ==
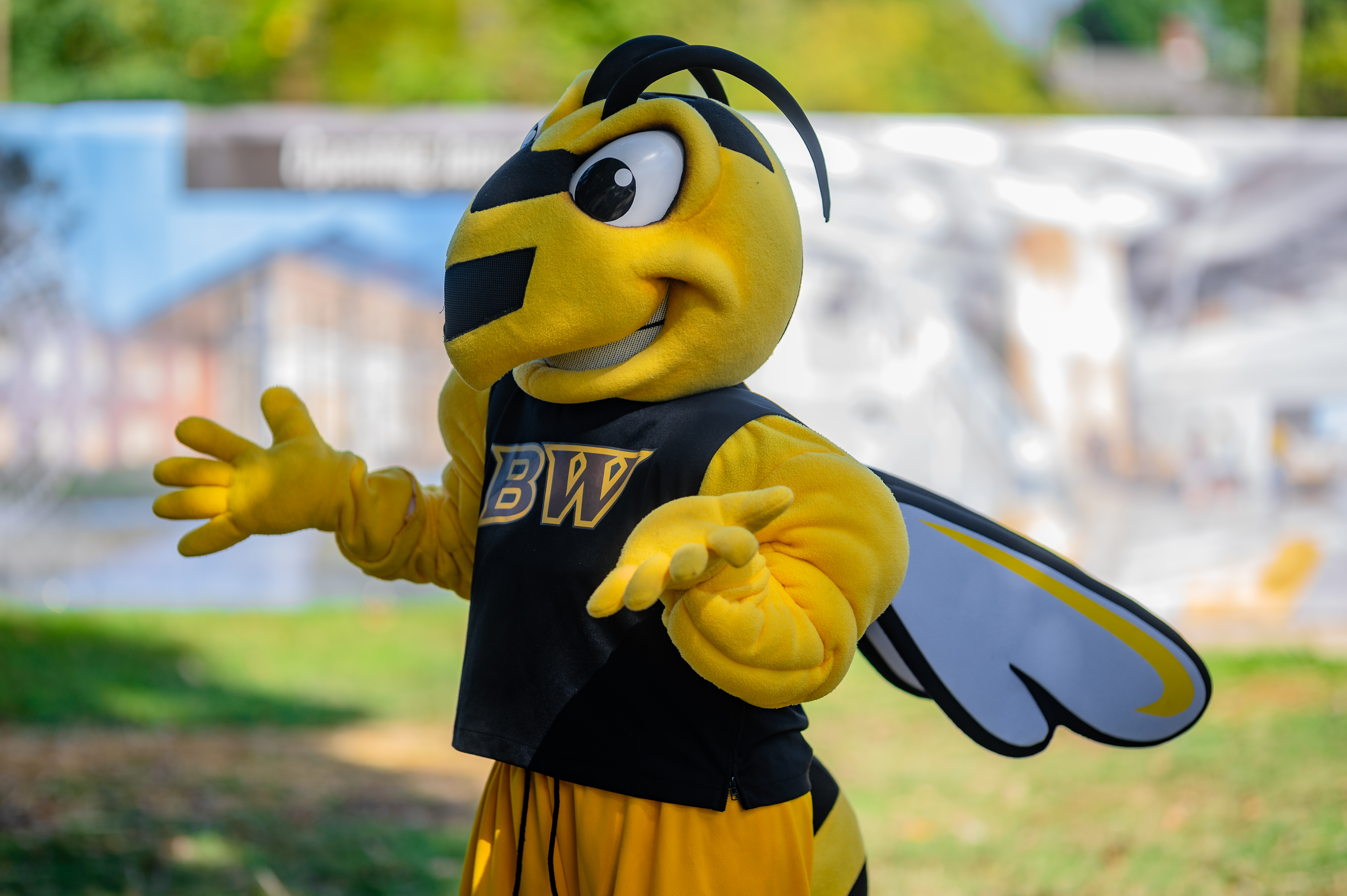
BW's mascot "Stinger"

BW's school colors are officially brown and gold, although the Conservatory of Performing Arts has adopted Fuchsia for their primary colors and marketing literature.

The school's varsity sports teams are the Baldwin Wallace Yellow Jackets. They participate in the NCAA's Division III and the Ohio Athletic Conference. The university has long rivalries with John Carroll Blue Streaks and Mount Union Purple Raiders.

Lou Higgins Center is home to the physical education department, athletics, and recreational sports and services. The Lou Higgins Center was renovated and expanded in 2005. Beyond Varsity Athletics, Baldwin Wallace offers club sports, Intramurals, Aerobic Classes, a Fitness Center and Weight Room. Higgins Center is home to many of the athletic offices, along with Bagley Hall. Bagley Hall was originally owned by the Cleveland Browns and was used as the team's summer training facility. After the Browns left for Baltimore, the university converted the facility into a residence hall. In 2012, Bagley Hall was converted into athletic offices.

Baldwin Wallace's football team was coached by Lee Tressel, who led the team to an undefeated record in 1978, and subsequently the NCAA Division III Championship. In 2008, the athletic turf on George Finnie Stadium was renovated and named "Tressel Field" in honor of the Tressel Family.

Perhaps the most notable BW athlete from the 20th century was Harrison Dillard, the only male so far to win Olympic titles in both sprinting and hurdling events, in the 1948 Summer Olympics. The teams of the Sidney High School Yellow Jackets were named after Baldwin Wallace graduate Granville Robinson became Head Coach at Sidney High School.

In 2009, after almost 20 years of use, BW adopted a new logo and modified the mascot for the athletic teams.
