= List of athletes who competed in multiple sports at the Summer Olympic games =

Below is a list of the 1052 athletes who participated in two or more sports at the Summer Olympics. Viggo Jensen from Denmark, Carl Schuhmann from Germany and Launceston Elliot from the United Kingdom are the only athletes to compete in four different sports. Sheila Taormina from the United States and Truus Klapwijk from the Netherlands are the only women to have competed three different sports.

Of the athletes who participated in two or more Summer Olympics in two different sports, 48 are Swedish and 23 of them participated in the home Olympics in Stockholm 1912.

Gwynne Evans, Leo Goodwin, Frank Kugler and Joe Lydon are the only athletes to win medals in three different sports. All of them are from the US and won medals in all three sports at home in St. Louis in 1904. Only six female athletes, the British Rebecca Romero the East German Roswitha Krause, the American Katherine Rawls, the American Aileen Riggin, the Swedish Hjördis Töpel, the American Helen Wainwright and other six athletes (all cyclists), the German Judith Arndt, the Russian Olga Slyusareva, the American Rebecca Twigg, the Dutch Marianne Vos, the Australian Kathy Watt and the Dutch Leontien Zijlaard-van Moorsel have won medals in two different sports.

The only eight athletes to win gold medals in two different sports at two different Olympic Games are Karch Kiraly from the United States, Oussama Mellouli from Tunisia, Daniel Norling from Sweden, Paul Radmilovic from Great Britain, Marianne Vos from the Netherlands, Bradley Wiggins from Great Britain, Walter Winans from the United States and Vyacheslav Yekimov from Russia.

There are 26 athletes that have at least one Olympic appearance in art competitions, but this sport and its results are not included on the official Olympic website.

The most common combinations of sports are road cycling/track cycling (417), swimming/water polo (156) and marathon swimming/swimming (55).

== List ==
Men that won medals in different sports (59)
Men that won medals in different sports (but at least one uncertain) (21)
Men that won gold medals in different sports (but at least one uncertain) (8)
Women that won medals in different sports (11)
Athletes that won gold medals in different sports (21: 16 males and 5 females)

The total column gives the number of Olympic Games in which the athlete appeared, not counting separately the events in which they appeared.

| Athlete | Country | Sex | Sports | First | Last | Total Olympic appearances |
|---|---|---|---|---|---|---|
| Tarek Abou Al Dahab | Lebanon | M | road cycling 2, track cycling 2 | 1968 | 1972 | 2 |
| Domenico Acerenza | Italy | M | marathon swimming 1, swimming 1 | 2020 | 2024 | 2 |
| Héctor Acosta | Argentina | M | road cycling 1, track cycling 1 | 1960 | 1964 | 2 |
| Jiří Adam | Czechoslovakia | M | fencing 1, modern pentathlon 1 | 1976 | 1980 | 2 |
| Ben Adams | United States | M | athletics 1, baseball 1 | 1912 | 1912 | 1 |
| Edgar Adams | United States | M | diving 1, swimming 1 | 1904 | 1904 | 1 |
| Platt Adams | / United States | M | athletics 2, baseball 1 | 1908 | 1912 | 2 |
| Margarete Adler | Austrian Empire (1912), Austria | F | diving 1, swimming 1 | 1912 | 1924 | 2 |
| Bèto Adriana | Netherlands Antilles | M | shooting 1, weightlifting 1 | 1960 | 1972 | 2 |
| Jean Aerts | Belgium | M | road cycling 1, track cycling 1 | 1928 | 1928 | 1 |
| Krikor Agathon | Egypt | M | fencing 1, shooting 2 | 1924 | 1936 | 2 |
| Maximiliano Aguilar | Mexico | M | swimming 1, water polo 2 | 1968 | 1976 | 3 |
| Gaston Alancourt | France | M | road cycling 1, track cycling 1 | 1912 | 1920 | 2 |
| Agustín Alcántara | Mexico | M | road cycling 2, track cycling 1 | 1968 | 1972 | 2 |
| Peter Aldridge | Jamaica | M | road cycling 1, track cycling 2 | 1980 | 1988 | 3 |
| Caroline Alexander | United Kingdom | F | mountain bike cycling 2, road cycling 1 | 1996 | 2000 | 2 |
| Wazir Ali | Pakistan | M | road cycling 1, track cycling 1 | 1948 | 1948 | 1 |
| Antonio Almada | Mexico | M | fencing 1, modern pentathlon 3 | 1952 | 1960 | 3 |
| Carlos Miguel Álvarez | Argentina | M | road cycling 1, track cycling 3 | 1964 | 1972 | 3 |
| Orlando Amêndola | Brazil | M | swimming 1, water polo 1 | 1920 | 1920 | 1 |
| Carl Albert Andersen | Norway | M | athletics 1, gymnastics 1 | 1900 | 1908 | 2 |
| Knud Andersen | Denmark | M | road cycling 1, track cycling 1 | 1948 | 1952 | 2 |
| Albert Andersson | Sweden | M | athletics 1, gymnastics 1 | 1920 | 1928 | 2 |
| Erik Andersson | Sweden | M | swimming 1, water polo 2 | 1912 | 1924 | 3 |
| Robert Andersson | Sweden | M | diving 2, swimming 3, water polo 3 | 1908 | 1920 | 3 |
| Vilhelm Andersson | Sweden | M | swimming 2, water polo 3 | 1908 | 1924 | 4 |
| Hans Andresen | Denmark | M | road cycling 1, track cycling 1 | 1948 | 1952 | 2 |
| Frankie Andreu | United States | M | road cycling 1, track cycling 1 | 1988 | 1996 | 2 |
| Hans Aniol | German Empire | M | swimming 1, water polo 1 | 1900 | 1900 | 1 |
| Harold Annison | United Kingdom | M | swimming 2, water polo 1 | 1920 | 1924 | 2 |
| Andrejs Apsītis | Russian Empire (1912), Latvia | M | road cycling 1, track cycling 1 | 1912 | 1924 | 2 |
| Gregorio Aldo Arencibia | Cuba | M | road cycling 3, track cycling 1 | 1972 | 1980 | 3 |
| Nancy Arendt-Kemp | Luxembourg | F | swimming 1, triathlon 1 | 1988 | 2000 | 2 |
| Samantha Arévalo | Ecuador | F | marathon swimming 2, swimming 1 | 2012 | 2020 | 3 |
| Juan Arias | Colombia | M | mountain bike cycling 1, road cycling 1 | 1988 | 1996 | 2 |
| Judith Arndt | Germany | F | road cycling 4, track cycling 3 | 1996 | 2012 | 5 |
| Marcelo Arriagada | Chile | M | road cycling 1, track cycling 1 | 1996 | 2004 | 2 |
| Gösta Åsbrink | Sweden | M | gymnastics 1, modern pentathlon 1 | 1908 | 1912 | 2 |
| Hossein Askari | Iran | M | road cycling 2, track cycling 1 | 2000 | 2008 | 3 |
| Andreas Asimakopoulos | Kingdom of Greece | M | swimming 1, water polo 2 | 1912 | 1924 | 3 |
| Lorne Atkinson | Canada | M | road cycling 1, track cycling 1 | 1948 | 1948 | 1 |
| Felix Auböck | Austria | M | marathon swimming 1, swimming 3 | 2016 | 2024 | 3 |
| David Aubry | France | M | marathon swimming 1, swimming 2 | 2020 | 2024 | 2 |
| André Aumerle | France | M | road cycling 1, track cycling 1 | 1928 | 1928 | 1 |
| Ventsislav Aydarski | Bulgaria | M | marathon swimming 1, swimming 1 | 2012 | 2016 | 2 |
| Snowy Baker | Australasia | M | boxing 1, diving 1, swimming 1 | 1908 | 1908 | 1 |
| Július Balász | Czechoslovakia | M | diving 2, swimming 1 | 1924 | 1928 | 2 |
| Linas Balčiūnas | Lithuania | M | road cycling 1, track cycling 1 | 1996 | 2004 | 2 |
| Fabio Baldato | Italy | M | road cycling 1, track cycling 1 | 1988 | 1996 | 2 |
| Elisa Balsamo | Italy | F | road cycling 1, track cycling 2 | 2020 | 2024 | 2 |
| Eduardo Barbeiro | Portugal | M | swimming 1, water polo 1 | 1952 | 1952 | 1 |
| David Bárcena Ríos | Mexico | M | equestrian 3, modern pentathlon 2 | 1964 | 1980 | 5 |
| Bijoy Barman | India | M | swimming 1, water polo 1 | 1952 | 1952 | 1 |
| Marie Baron | Netherlands | F | diving 1, swimming 2 | 1924 | 1928 | 2 |
| András Baronyi | Kingdom of Hungary | M | athletics 1, swimming 2 | 1908 | 1912 | 2 |
| Émile Barral | Monaco | M | athletics 1, sailing 2 | 1920 | 1928 | 3 |
| Edward Barrett | United Kingdom | M | athletics 1, tug of war 1, wrestling 2 | 1908 | 1912 | 2 |
| Daniela Bártová | Czechoslovakia (1992), Czech Republic | F | athletics 1, gymnastics 1 | 1992 | 2000 | 2 |
| Roger Basset | France | M | athletics 1, tug of war 1 | 1900 | 1900 | 1 |
| Louis Bastien | France | M | fencing 1, track cycling 1 | 1900 | 1900 | 1 |
| Kate Bates | Australia | F | road cycling 1, track cycling 2 | 2004 | 2008 | 2 |
| Orlando Bates | Barbados | M | road cycling 1, track cycling 1 | 1972 | 1972 | 1 |
| Edward Battell | United Kingdom | M | road cycling 1, track cycling 1 | 1896 | 1896 | 1 |
| Frank Battig | Austria | M | fencing 1, modern pentathlon 1 | 1960 | 1968 | 2 |
| Emir Batur Albayrak | Tunisia | M | marathon swimming 1, swimming 1 | 2024 | 2024 | 1 |
| Yves Baudrier | France | M | art competitions 1, sailing 1 | 1936 | 1948 | 2 |
| René Bauwens | Belgium | M | swimming 1, water polo 2 | 1920 | 1928 | 2 |
| Louise Bawden | Australia | F | beach volleyball 2, volleyball 1 | 2000 | 2016 | 3 |
| Rex Beach | United States | M | swimming 1, water polo 1 | 1904 | 1904 | 1 |
| Margaret Bean | Guam | F | road cycling 1, track cycling 1 | 1992 | 1992 | 1 |
| Lily Beaurepaire | Australia | F | diving 1, swimming 1 | 1920 | 1920 | 1 |
| Albert Bechestobill | United States | M | athletics 1, wrestling 1 | 1904 | 1904 | 1 |
| Leonie Beck | Germany | F | marathon swimming 1, swimming 1 | 2016 | 2020 | 2 |
| Robert Beck | United States | M | fencing 1, modern pentathlon 2 | 1960 | 1968 | 2 |
| Rie Beisenherz | Netherlands | F | swimming 1, water polo 1 | 1920 | 1920 | 1 |
| Charlotte Becker | Germany | F | road cycling 1, track cycling 2 | 2012 | 2016 | 2 |
| László Beleznai | Kingdom of Hungary | M | swimming 1, water polo 1 | 1912 | 1912 | 1 |
| Adolfo Belmonte | Mexico | M | road cycling 2, track cycling 1 | 1964 | 1968 | 2 |
| Bouke Benenga | Netherlands | M | swimming 1, water polo 1 | 1908 | 1908 | 1 |
| Izaskun Bengoa | Spain | F | road cycling 1, track cycling 1 | 1996 | 1996 | 1 |
| Tibor Benkő | Kingdom of Hungary | M | fencing 1, modern pentathlon 1 | 1932 | 1932 | 1 |
| Ralf Berckhan | Germany (1952), Germany (1960) | M | canoeing 1, modern pentathlon 1 | 1952 | 1960 | 2 |
| Ramón Berdomás | Restoration (Spain) | M | swimming 1, water polo 1 | 1920 | 1924 | 2 |
| Olga Beresnyeva | Ukraine | F | marathon swimming 1, swimming 2 | 2000 | 2012 | 3 |
| Amilcare Beretta | Kingdom of Italy | M | swimming 1, water polo 1 | 1908 | 1920 | 2 |
| Erik Bergqvist | Sweden | M | swimming 1, water polo 2 | 1912 | 1920 | 2 |
| Waldemar Bernatzky | Uruguay | M | road cycling 1, track cycling 1 | 1948 | 1948 | 1 |
| Edmond Bernhardt | Austrian Empire | M | modern pentathlon 1, shooting 1 | 1912 | 1912 | 1 |
| Victoire Berteau | France | F | road cycling 1, track cycling 2 | 2020 | 2024 | 2 |
| Joseph Bertrand | France | M | swimming 1, water polo 1 | 1900 | 1900 | 1 |
| Dávid Betlehem | Hungary | M | marathon swimming 1, swimming 1 | 2024 | 2024 | 1 |
| Imtiaz Bhatti | Pakistan | M | road cycling 1, track cycling 1 | 1952 | 1952 | 1 |
| Cecilia Biagioli | Argentina | F | marathon swimming 2, swimming 4 | 2000 | 2020 | 5 |
| Udo Birnbaum | Austria | M | fencing 2, modern pentathlon 2 | 1960 | 1968 | 3 |
| Stefan Bissegger | Switzerland | M | road cycling 1, track cycling 1 | 2020 | 2024 | 2 |
| Svend Erik Bjerg | Denmark | M | road cycling 1, track cycling 1 | 1968 | 1972 | 2 |
| Vaughn Blanchard | United States | M | athletics 1, baseball 1 | 1912 | 1912 | 1 |
| Gérard Blitz | Belgium | M | swimming 4, water polo 3 | 1920 | 1936 | 4 |
| Chris Boardman | United Kingdom | M | road cycling 2, track cycling 2 | 1988 | 2000 | 4 |
| András Bodnár | Hungary | M | swimming 2, water polo 4 | 1960 | 1972 | 4 |
| Victor Boin | Belgium | M | fencing 2, swimming 1, water polo 2 | 1908 | 1920 | 3 |
| Alida Bolten | Netherlands | F | swimming 1, water polo 1 | 1920 | 1924 | 2 |
| Léon van Bon | Netherlands | M | road cycling 1, track cycling 1 | 1992 | 2000 | 2 |
| Ricardo Boneo | Argentina | M | rowing 1, sailing 3 | 1948 | 1972 | 4 |
| George Bonhag | // United States | M | athletics 3, baseball 1 | 1904 | 1912 | 3 |
| Louis Bonniot de Fleurac | France | M | art competitions 1, athletics 1 | 1908 | 1912 | 2 |
| Walter Bortel | Austria | M | road cycling 2, track cycling 2 | 1952 | 1956 | 2 |
| Marcel Boulenger | France | M | art competitions 1, fencing 1 | 1900 | 1912 | 2 |
| Harold Bounsall | Canada | M | road cycling 1, track cycling 1 | 1920 | 1920 | 1 |
| Mickaël Bourgain | France | M | road cycling 1, track cycling 3 | 2004 | 2012 | 3 |
| Scott Bowden | Australia | M | mountain bike cycling 1, road cycling 1 | 2016 | 2016 | 1 |
| John den Braber | Netherlands | M | road cycling 1, track cycling 1 | 1992 | 2000 | 2 |
| Carlos Branco | Brazil | M | rowing 1, water polo 1 | 1924 | 1932 | 2 |
| Janus Braspennincx | Netherlands | M | road cycling 1, track cycling 1 | 1928 | 1928 | 1 |
| David Bratton | United States | M | swimming 1, water polo 1 | 1904 | 1904 | 1 |
| Frank Brazier | Australia | M | road cycling 1, track cycling 2 | 1956 | 1960 | 2 |
| Lisa Brennauer | Germany | F | road cycling 2, track cycling 2 | 2012 | 2020 | 3 |
| Roberto Breppe | Argentina | M | road cycling 3, track cycling 1 | 1964 | 1972 | 3 |
| Charles Brickley | United States | M | athletics 1, baseball 1 | 1912 | 1912 | 1 |
| Frank Brilando | United States | M | road cycling 1, track cycling 1 | 1948 | 1952 | 2 |
| Jacinto Brito | Mexico | M | road cycling 1, track cycling 1 | 1960 | 1960 | 1 |
| Oscar Brockmeyer | United States | M | athletics 1, football 1 | 1904 | 1904 | 1 |
| René Brossy | France | M | road cycling 1, track cycling 1 | 1928 | 1928 | 1 |
| Barb Broen-Ouelette | Canada | F | beach volleyball 1, volleyball 1 | 1984 | 1996 | 2 |
| Richardos Brousalis | Kingdom of Greece | M | swimming 1, water polo 1 | 1936 | 1948 | 2 |
| Avery Brundage | United States | M | art competitions 2, athletics 1 | 1912 | 1936 | 3 |
| Paul Brydon | New Zealand | M | road cycling 1, track cycling 1 | 1972 | 1972 | 1 |
| Yngvar Bryn | Norway | M | athletics 1, figure skating 1 | 1900 | 1920 | 2 |
| Beate Bühler | West Germany (1984), Germany | F | beach volleyball 1, volleyball 1 | 1984 | 1996 | 2 |
| Bill Burgess | United Kingdom | M | swimming 1, water polo 1 | 1900 | 1900 | 1 |
| Alfonso Buonocore | Italy | M | swimming 1, water polo 1 | 1952 | 1956 | 2 |
| Luigi Burlando | Kingdom of Italy | M | football 2, water polo 1 | 1920 | 1924 | 2 |
| Wilbur Burroughs | United States | M | athletics 1, tug of war 1 | 1908 | 1908 | 1 |
| Lene Byberg | Norway | F | mountain bike cycling 1, road cycling 1 | 2004 | 2008 | 2 |
| Albert Byrd | United States | M | road cycling 1, track cycling 1 | 1936 | 1936 | 1 |
| Richard Byrd | United States | M | athletics 1, baseball 1 | 1912 | 1912 | 1 |
| Netai Bysack | India | M | road cycling 1, track cycling 1 | 1952 | 1952 | 1 |
| Franco Cacioni | Venezuela | M | road cycling 1, track cycling 1 | 1956 | 1956 | 1 |
| Victor Cadet | France | M | swimming 1, water polo 1 | 1900 | 1900 | 1 |
| Joseph Callens | Belgium | M | diving 1, swimming 1 | 1920 | 1924 | 2 |
| Don Campbell | Cayman Islands | M | road cycling 1, track cycling 1 | 1992 | 1992 | 1 |
| Carlos de Candamo | Perù | M | fencing 1, tennis 1 | 1900 | 1900 | 1 |
| Christophe Capelle | France | M | road cycling 1, track cycling 2 | 1996 | 2000 | 2 |
| Jacques Cariou | France | M | show jumping 2, eventing 1 | 1912 | 1912 | 1 |
| Eric Carlberg | Sweden | M | fencing 2, modern pentathlon 1, shooting 3 | 1908 | 1924 | 3 |
| Conrad Carlsrud | Norway | M | athletics 1, gymnastics 1 | 1908 | 1908 | 1 |
| Richard Carr | India | M | athletics 1, field hockey 1 | 1932 | 1932 | 1 |
| Vera Carrara | Italy | F | road cycling 1, track cycling 2 | 2004 | 2008 | 2 |
| Carlota Castrejana | Spain | F | athletics 3, basketball 1 | 1992 | 2008 | 4 |
| Mark Cavendish | United Kingdom | M | road cycling 1, track cycling 2 | 2008 | 2016 | 3 |
| Ken Caves | Australia | M | road cycling 2, track cycling 1 | 1948 | 1952 | 2 |
| Federico Cesarano | Kingdom of Italy | M | fencing 1, shooting 1 | 1920 | 1924 | 2 |
| Elise Chabbey | Switzerland | F | canoeing 1, road cycling 1 | 2012 | 2024 | 2 |
| Charles Chadwick | United States | M | athletics 1, tug of war 1 | 1904 | 1904 | 1 |
| Suprovat Chakravarty | India | M | road cycling 1, track cycling 1 | 1952 | 1952 | 1 |
| Yelena Chalykh | Russia (2004), Azerbaijan | F | road cycling 1, track cycling 1 | 2004 | 2012 | 2 |
| Chan Fai Lui | Hong Kong | M | road cycling 1, track cycling 1 | 1976 | 1976 | 1 |
| Somchai Chantarasamrit | Thailand | M | road cycling 1, track cycling 2 | 1964 | 1968 | 2 |
| Robert Charpentier | France | M | road cycling 1, track cycling 1 | 1936 | 1936 | 1 |
| David Chauner | United States | M | road cycling 1, track cycling 2 | 1968 | 1972 | 2 |
| Cath Cheatley | New Zealand | M | road cycling 1, track cycling 1 | 2008 | 2008 | 1 |
| Ihor Chervynskyi | Ukraine | M | marathon swimming 2, swimming 2 | 2000 | 2012 | 4 |
| Moustafa Chichi | Iran | M | road cycling 1, track cycling 1 | 1988 | 1988 | 1 |
| André Chilo | France | M | athletics 1, rugby 1 | 1920 | 1920 | 1 |
| Arsenio Chirinos | Venezuela | M | road cycling 2, track cycling 1 | 1956 | 1960 | 2 |
| Paul Chocque | France | M | road cycling 1, track cycling 1 | 1932 | 1932 | 1 |
| Chow Kwong Choi | Hong Kong | M | road cycling 1, track cycling 1 | 1964 | 1964 | 1 |
| Choy Mow Thim | Malaysia | M | road cycling 1, track cycling 1 | 1964 | 1964 | 1 |
| Henrik Christiansen | Norway | M | marathon swimming 1, swimming 3 | 2016 | 2024 | 3 |
| Jaroslav Cihlář | Czechoslovakia | M | road cycling 1, track cycling 1 | 1956 | 1956 | 1 |
| Austin Clapp | United States | M | swimming 1, water polo 1 | 1928 | 1932 | 2 |
| Ted Clayton | South Africa | M | road cycling 1, track cycling 1 | 1936 | 1936 | 1 |
| Jules Clévenot | France | M | swimming 1, water polo 1 | 1900 | 1900 | 1 |
| Marion Clignet | France | F | road cycling 2, track cycling 2 | 1992 | 2000 | 3 |
| Joseph Cludts | Belgium | M | swimming 1, water polo 1 | 1920 | 1924 | 2 |
| Wesley Coe | / United States | M | athletics 2, tug of war 1 | 1904 | 1908 | 2 |
| Aëcio Coelho | Brazil | M | equestrian 1, modern pentathlon 1 | 1948 | 1948 | 1 |
| Des Cohen | South Africa | M | swimming 1, water polo 1 | 1948 | 1952 | 2 |
| Lionel Coleman | Canada | M | road cycling 1, track cycling 1 | 1936 | 1936 | 1 |
| Antonius Colenbrander | Netherlands | M | equestrian eventing 1, equestrian jumping 1 | 1924 | 1928 | 2 |
| Jean Collas | France | M | rugby 1, tug of war 1 | 1900 | 1900 | 1 |
| Ricardo Conde | Spain | M | swimming 1, water polo 1 | 1952 | 1952 | 1 |
| Ernesto Contreras | Argentina | M | road cycling 1, track cycling 3 | 1960 | 1968 | 3 |
| Pierre Coppieters | Belgium | M | swimming 1, water polo 2 | 1928 | 1936 | 2 |
| George Cortlever | Netherlands | M | swimming 1, water polo 2 | 1908 | 1920 | 2 |
| Guilherme Costa | Brazil | M | marathon swimming 1, swimming 2 | 2020 | 2024 | 2 |
| Élie, Count de Lastours | France | M | fencing 1, tennis 1 | 1900 | 1900 | 1 |
| Félicien Courbet | Belgium | M | swimming 3, water polo 1 | 1908 | 1920 | 3 |
| J. Ira Courtney | United States | M | athletics 1, baseball 1 | 1912 | 1912 | 1 |
| Nick Craig | United Kingdom | M | mountain bike cycling 1, road cycling 1 | 2000 | 2000 | 1 |
| Robert Crawshaw | United Kingdom | M | swimming 1, water polo 1 | 1900 | 1900 | 1 |
| Ludmila Cristea | Republic of Moldova | F | judo 1, wrestling 1 | 2000 | 2008 | 2 |
| Alexandra Croak | Australia | F | diving 1, gymnastics 1 | 2000 | 2008 | 2 |
| George Crompton | Canada | M | road cycling 1, track cycling 1 | 1936 | 1936 | 1 |
| Steve Cummings | United Kingdom | M | road cycling 2, track cycling 1 | 2004 | 2016 | 3 |
| Paul Curran | United Kingdom | M | road cycling 1, track cycling 1 | 1984 | 1988 | 2 |
| Anísio da Rocha | Brazil | M | equestrian 1, modern pentathlon 1 | 1936 | 1948 | 2 |
| Jiří Daler | Czechoslovakia | M | road cycling 1, track cycling 2 | 1964 | 1968 | 2 |
| Ira Davenport | United States | M | athletics 1, baseball 1 | 1912 | 1912 | 1 |
| David Davies | United Kingdom | M | marathon swimming 1, swimming 3 | 2004 | 2012 | 3 |
| James Davies | Canada | M | road cycling 1, track cycling 1 | 1956 | 1956 | 1 |
| Octave Dayen | France | M | road cycling 1, track cycling 1 | 1928 | 1928 | 1 |
| Albert De Bunné | Belgium | M | road cycling 1, track cycling 1 | 1920 | 1920 | 1 |
| Enrique de Chávarri | Restoration (Spain) | M | athletics 1, field hockey 1 | 1928 | 1928 | 1 |
| Joseph De Combe | Belgium | M | swimming 2, water polo 2 | 1924 | 1936 | 3 |
| Olivier, Count de la Mazeliere | France | M | ballooning 1, equestrian driving 1 | 1900 | 1900 | 1 |
| Luis Ángel de los Santos | Uruguay | M | road cycling 1, track cycling 2 | 1948 | 1952 | 2 |
| Luis de Meyer | Argentina | M | road cycling 2, track cycling 1 | 1924 | 1928 | 2 |
| Roland De Neve | Belgium | M | road cycling 1, track cycling 1 | 1964 | 1964 | 1 |
| André de Schonen | France | M | fencing 1, shooting 2 | 1900 | 1924 | 2 |
| Gustaaf De Smet | Belgium | M | road cycling 1, track cycling 1 | 1956 | 1956 | 1 |
| Rafael Afonso de Sousa | Portugal | M | modern pentathlon 1, shooting 1 | 1932 | 1932 | 1 |
| François De Wagheneire | Belgium | M | road cycling 1, track cycling 1 | 1956 | 1956 | 1 |
| John Dean | New Zealand | M | road cycling 1, track cycling 1 | 1968 | 1972 | 2 |
| Julian Dean | New Zealand | M | road cycling 3, track cycling 1 | 1996 | 2008 | 4 |
| Arthur Dearborn | United States | M | athletics 1, tug of war 1 | 1908 | 1908 | 1 |
| René Deceja | Uruguay | M | road cycling 2, track cycling 1 | 1956 | 1968 | 2 |
| Henri Decoin | France | M | swimming 1, water polo 1 | 1908 | 1912 | 2 |
| Peter Deimböck | Austria | M | road cycling 1, track cycling 1 | 1960 | 1960 | 1 |
| Henri Demiéville | Switzerland | M | swimming 1, water polo 2 | 1920 | 1924 | 2 |
| Fritz Dennerlein | Italy | M | swimming 2, water polo 2 | 1956 | 1964 | 3 |
| Rohan Dennis | Australia | M | road cycling 2, track cycling 1 | 2012 | 2020 | 3 |
| Ferdinand Denzler | Switzerland | M | art competitions 1, water polo 1 | 1936 | 1948 | 2 |
| Charles Devendeville | France | M | swimming 1, water polo 1 | 1900 | 1900 | 1 |
| Heriberto Díaz | Mexico | M | road cycling 2, track cycling 1 | 1964 | 1968 | 2 |
| Washington Díaz | Uruguay | M | road cycling 1, track cycling 1 | 1976 | 1976 | 1 |
| Albert Dickin | United Kingdom | M | diving 2, swimming 3 | 1920 | 1928 | 3 |
| Joseph Dilg | United States | M | rowing 1, wrestling 1 | 1900 | 1900 | 1 |
| Ellen van Dijk | Netherlands | F | road cycling 3, track cycling 1 | 2012 | 2024 | 3 |
| Bernd Dittert | East Germany (1988), Germany | M | road cycling 1, track cycling 1 | 1988 | 1992 | 2 |
| Władysław Dobrowolski | Poland | M | athletics 1, fencing 2 | 1924 | 1936 | 3 |
| Ansco Dokkum | Netherlands | M | rowing 1, sailing 1 | 1928 | 1936 | 2 |
| Ahmed Al-Doseri | Bahrain | M | fencing 1, modern pentathlon 1 | 1988 | 1988 | 1 |
| Howard Drew | United States | M | athletics 1, baseball 1 | 1912 | 1912 | 1 |
| Miguel Droguett | Chile | M | road cycling 1, track cycling 2 | 1984 | 1992 | 2 |
| Alison Dunlap | United States | F | mountain bike cycling 1, road cycling 1 | 1996 | 2000 | 2 |
| Jacques Dupont | France | M | road cycling 1, track cycling 1 | 1948 | 1948 | 1 |
| Antonio Duque | Mexico | M | road cycling 1, track cycling 1 | 1964 | 1964 | 1 |
| Hugh Durant | United Kingdom | M | modern pentathlon 1, shooting 1 | 1912 | 1912 | 1 |
| Roberto Durão | Portugal | M | fencing 1, modern pentathlon 1 | 1984 | 1988 | 2 |
| Chloé Dygert | United States | F | road cycling 2, track cycling 3 | 2016 | 2024 | 3 |
| Günter Oskar Dyhrenfurth> | Switzerland | M | alpinism 1, art competitions 1 | 1936 | 1936 | 1 |
| Gustaf Dyrssen | Sweden | M | fencing 3, modern pentathlon 2 | 1920 | 1936 | 4 |
| Martin Earley | Ireland | M | mountain bike cycling 1, road cycling 1 | 1984 | 1996 | 2 |
| Nima Ebrahim | Iran | M | road cycling 1, track cycling 1 | 1992 | 1992 | 1 |
| Hector Edwards | Barbados | M | road cycling 1, track cycling 2 | 1972 | 1976 | 2 |
| Lew Elder | Canada | M | road cycling 1, track cycling 1 | 1928 | 1928 | 1 |
| Taha Youssef El-Gamal | Egypt | M | swimming 1, water polo 2 | 1948 | 1952 | 2 |
| Frank Elliott | Canada | M | road cycling 1, track cycling 1 | 1932 | 1932 | 1 |
| Launceston Elliot | United Kingdom | M | athletics 2, gymnastics 1, weightlifting 1, wrestling 1 | 1896 | 1900 | 2 |
| Malcolm Elliott | United Kingdom | M | road cycling 1, track cycling 1 | 1980 | 1996 | 2 |
| Dorri El-Said | Egypt | M | swimming 2, water polo 3 | 1948 | 1960 | 3 |
| Max Emmerich | United States | M | athletics 1, gymnastics 1 | 1904 | 1904 | 1 |
| Esteban Enderica | Ecuador | M | marathon swimming 1, swimming 2 | 2012 | 2016 | 2 |
| Alfred Engelsen | Norway | M | diving 1, gymnastics 1 | 1912 | 1912 | 1 |
| Julie Ertel | United States | F | triathlon 1, water polo 1 | 2000 | 2008 | 2 |
| Sergio Escobedo | Mexico | M | fencing 1, modern pentathlon 1 | 1960 | 1960 | 1 |
| George Estman | South Africa | M | road cycling 2, track cycling 1 | 1948 | 1952 | 2 |
| Rubén Etchebarne | Uruguay | M | road cycling 1, track cycling 2 | 1960 | 1964 | 2 |
| Cadel Evans | Australia | M | mountain bike cycling 2, road cycling 2 | 1996 | 2012 | 4 |
| Gwynne Evans | United States | M | athletics 1, swimming 1, water polo 1 | 1904 | 1904 | 1 |
| Henk Faanhof | Netherlands | M | road cycling 1, track cycling 1 | 1948 | 1948 | 1 |
| László Fábián | Hungary | M | fencing 1, modern pentathlon 2 | 1988 | 1992 | 2 |
| Saleh Sultan Faraj | Bahrain | M | fencing 1, modern pentathlon 2 | 1984 | 1988 | 2 |
| Saleem Farooqi | Pakistan | M | road cycling 1, track cycling 1 | 1956 | 1956 | 1 |
| Kristen Faulkner | United States | F | road cycling 1, track cycling 1 | 2024 | 2024 | 1 |
| Jane Fauntz | United States | F | diving 1, swimming 1 | 1928 | 1932 | 2 |
| Oleksandr Fedenko | Ukraine | M | road cycling 1, track cycling 2 | 1996 | 2000 | 2 |
| László Felkai | Hungary | M | swimming 1, water polo 3 | 1960 | 1968 | 3 |
| Feng Chun-Kai | Chinese Taipei | M | road cycling 1, track cycling 1 | 2008 | 2020 | 2 |
| Howard Fenton | Jamaica | M | road cycling 1, track cycling 1 | 1972 | 1972 | 1 |
| Steven Ferguson | New Zealand | M | canoeing 3, swimming 1 | 2000 | 2012 | 4 |
| Pauline Ferrand-Prévot | France | F | mountain bike cycling 4, road cycling 2 | 2012 | 2024 | 4 |
| Lawrence Feuerbach | United States | M | athletics 1, tug of war 1 | 1904 | 1904 | 1 |
| Fernand Feyaerts | Belgium | M | swimming 1, water polo 2 | 1900 | 1908 | 2 |
| João Gonçalves Filho | Brazil | M | swimming 2, water polo 3 | 1952 | 1968 | 5 |
| Adhemar Grijó Filho | Brazil | M | swimming 1, water polo 2 | 1952 | 1964 | 3 |
| Conn Findlay | /United States | M | rowing 3, sailing 1 | 1956 | 1976 | 4 |
| Paul Fischer | German Empire | M | athletics 1, gymnastics 1 | 1908 | 1908 | 1 |
| Edwin Flack | Australia | M | athletics 1, tennis 1 | 1896 | 1896 | 1 |
| John Flanagan | / United States | M | athletics 3, tug of war 1 | 1900 | 1908 | 3 |
| Jacques Flouret | France | M | athletics 1, basketball 1 | 1928 | 1936 | 2 |
| Daniel Fogg | United Kingdom | M | marathon swimming 1, swimming 1 | 2012 | 2012 | 1 |
| Colin Forde | Barbados | M | road cycling 1, track cycling 1 | 1968 | 1968 | 1 |
| Samu Fóti | Kingdom of Hungary | M | athletics 1, gymnastics 1 | 1912 | 1912 | 1 |
| Amédée Fournier | France | M | road cycling 1, track cycling 1 | 1932 | 1932 | 1 |
| Brian Fowler | New Zealand | M | road cycling 4, track cycling 1 | 1984 | 1996 | 4 |
| Robert Fowler | South Africa | M | road cycling 2, track cycling 3 | 1952 | 1960 | 3 |
| Thomas Frischknecht | Switzerland | M | mountain bike cycling 3, road cycling 1 | 1996 | 2004 | 3 |
| Jakob Fuglsang | Denmark | M | mountain bike cycling 1, road cycling 3 | 2008 | 2020 | 4 |
| Sachiko Fujita | Japan | F | beach volleyball 1, volleyball 1 | 1988 | 1996 | 2 |
| Jean Gaertner | United States | F | athletics 1, volleyball 1 | 1960 | 1964 | 2 |
| Ângelo Gammaro | Brazil | M | swimming 1, water polo 1 | 1920 | 1920 | 1 |
| Johannes Gandil | Denmark | M | athletics 1, football 1 | 1900 | 1908 | 2 |
| Filippo Ganna | Italy | M | road cycling 2, track cycling 3 | 2016 | 2024 | 3 |
| Carlos Garach Benito | Spain | M | marathon swimming 1, swimming 1 | 2024 | 2024 | 1 |
| Carlos Garces | Mexico | M | athletics 1, football 1 | 1924 | 1928 | 2 |
| Evelyn García | El Salvador | F | road cycling 2, track cycling 2 | 2004 | 2012 | 3 |
| Fernando García | Philippines | M | judo 1, wrestling 1 | 1964 | 1972 | 2 |
| Jazy Garcia | Guam | M | road cycling 2, track cycling 1 | 1992 | 2000 | 2 |
| Jhon García | Colombia | M | road cycling 1, track cycling 1 | 1996 | 2000 | 2 |
| Manuel García | Guam | M | road cycling 1, track cycling 1 | 1992 | 1992 | 1 |
| Otto Garnus | Switzerland | M | athletics 1, weightlifting 1 | 1924 | 1928 | 2 |
| Auguste Garrebeek | Belgium | M | road cycling 1, track cycling 1 | 1936 | 1936 | 1 |
| Philippe Gaumont | France | M | road cycling 1, track cycling 1 | 1992 | 2000 | 2 |
| Derek Gee-West | Canada | M | road cycling 1, track cycling 1 | 2020 | 2024 | 2 |
| Pierre Gellé | France | M | swimming 1, water polo 1 | 1900 | 1900 | 1 |
| Pat Gellineau | Trinidad and Tobago | M | road cycling 1, track cycling 1 | 1972 | 1972 | 1 |
| Nikolaos Georgantas | Kingdom of Greece | M | athletics 2, tug of war 1 | 1904 | 1908 | 2 |
| David George | South Africa | M | road cycling 2, track cycling 1 | 1996 | 2008 | 3 |
| Spyros Gianniotis | Greece | M | marathon swimming 3, swimming 3 | 2000 | 2016 | 5 |
| George Giles | New Zealand | M | road cycling 1, track cycling 1 | 1936 | 1936 | 1 |
| Aquiles Gloffka | Chile | M | fencing 1, modern pentathlon 1 | 1964 | 1964 | 1 |
| Douglas Godfree | United Kingdom | M | fencing 2, modern pentathlon 1 | 1908 | 1912 | 2 |
| Augustus Goessling | / United States | M | swimming 1, water polo 1 | 1904 | 1908 | 2 |
| Jeanne Golay | United States | F | road cycling 2, track cycling 1 | 1992 | 1996 | 2 |
| Hans Goldschmid | Austria | M | road cycling 1, track cycling 1 | 1948 | 1948 | 1 |
| Charles Gondouin | France | M | rugby 1, tug of war 1 | 1900 | 1900 | 1 |
| Angie González | Venezuela | F | road cycling 1, track cycling 2 | 2008 | 2016 | 3 |
| Santos González | Spain | M | road cycling 1, track cycling 1 | 1992 | 2000 | 2 |
| Víctor González | Uruguay | M | road cycling 1, track cycling 1 | 1976 | 1976 | 1 |
| Yoanka González | Cuba | F | road cycling 1, track cycling 2 | 2000 | 2008 | 3 |
| Leo Goodwin | / United States | M | diving 1, swimming 2, water polo 1 | 1904 | 1908 | 2 |
| Melissa Gorman | Australia | F | marathon swimming 2, swimming 1 | 2008 | 2012 | 2 |
| Jean Goujon | France | M | road cycling 1, track cycling 1 | 1936 | 1936 | 1 |
| Donna Gould | Australia | F | athletics 1, road cycling 1 | 1984 | 1988 | 2 |
| Hans Granfelt | Sweden | M | athletics 1, fencing 1 | 1920 | 1936 | 2 |
| Erica Green | South Africa | F | mountain bike cycling 2, road cycling 1 | 1996 | 2000 | 2 |
| Oscar Grégoire | Belgium | M | swimming 2, water polo 3 | 1900 | 1912 | 3 |
| Lara Grangeon | France | F | marathon swimming 1, swimming 2 | 2012 | 2020 | 3 |
| John Grieb | United States | M | athletics 1, gymnastics 1 | 1904 | 1904 | 1 |
| Katie Grimes | United States | F | marathon swimming 1, swimming 2 | 2020 | 2024 | 2 |
| Adolphe Grisel | France | M | athletics 1, gymnastics 1 | 1896 | 1896 | 1 |
| Torsten Grönfors | Sweden | M | sailing 1, tennis 1 | 1912 | 1912 | 1 |
| Åke Grönhagen | Sweden | M | fencing 1, modern pentathlon 1 | 1912 | 1912 | 1 |
| Ignatius Gronkowski | United States | M | road cycling 1, track cycling 1 | 1924 | 1924 | 1 |
| Tatiana Guderzo | Italy | F | road cycling 4, track cycling 1 | 2004 | 2016 | 4 |
| Belem Guerrero | Mexico | F | road cycling 1, track cycling 3 | 1996 | 2004 | 3 |
| Max Gumpel | Sweden | M | swimming 1, water polo 2 | 1908 | 1920 | 3 |
| Gwon Jung-hyeon | Korea | M | road cycling 1, track cycling 1 | 1968 | 1968 | 1 |
| András Haán | Hungary | M | basketball 1, sailing 1 | 1964 | 1976 | 2 |
| Charles Haberkorn | United States | M | tug of war 1, wrestling 1 | 1904 | 1904 | 1 |
| Juan Carlos Haedo | Argentina | M | road cycling 1, track cycling 1 | 1976 | 1984 | 2 |
| Carroll Haff | United States | M | athletics 1, baseball 1 | 1912 | 1912 | 1 |
| Khosro Haghgosha | Iran | M | road cycling 2, track cycling 1 | 1972 | 1976 | 2 |
| Max Hainle | German Empire | M | swimming 1, water polo 1 | 1900 | 1900 | 1 |
| Alfréd Hajós | Kingdom of Hungary | M | art competitions 3, swimming 1 | 1896 | 1932 | 4 |
| Jack Hakim | Egypt | M | swimming 1, water polo 1 | 1948 | 1952 | 2 |
| Aurélie Halbwachs | Mauritius | F | mountain bike 1, road cycling 2 | 2008 | 2024 | 3 |
| Jón Halldórsson | Iceland | M | athletics 1, glima 1 | 1912 | 1912 | 1 |
| Joachim Halupczok | Poland | M | road cycling 1, track cycling 1 | 1988 | 1988 | 1 |
| David Hammond | United States | M | swimming 1, water polo 1 | 1904 | 1904 | 1 |
| Louis Handley | United States | M | swimming 1, water polo 1 | 1904 | 1904 | 1 |
| Jam Handy | United States | M | swimming 1, water polo 1 | 1904 | 1924 | 2 |
| Harry Hannus | Finland | M | road cycling 4, track cycling 1 | 1972 | 1984 | 4 |
| Pontus Hanson | Sweden | M | swimming 2, water polo 3 | 1908 | 1920 | 3 |
| Carl Hårleman | Sweden | M | athletics 1, gymnastics 1 | 1908 | 1912 | 2 |
| William Harvell | United Kingdom | M | road cycling 1, track cycling 1 | 1932 | 1932 | 1 |
| Jack Hatfield | United Kingdom | M | swimming 4, water polo 1 | 1912 | 1928 | 4 |
| João Havelange | Brazil | M | swimming 1, water polo 1 | 1936 | 1952 | 2 |
| Yoeri Havik | Netherlands | M | road cycling 1, track cycling 2 | 2020 | 2024 | 2 |
| John Hawes | Canada | M | modern pentathlon 1, swimming 1 | 1972 | 1976 | 2 |
| Heinrich Hax | Weimar Republic, Nazi Germany (1936) | M | modern pentathlon 1, shooting 2 | 1928 | 1936 | 3 |
| Rob Hayles | United Kingdom | M | road cycling 1, track cycling 3 | 1996 | 2004 | 3 |
| Harry Hebner | / United States | M | swimming 2, water polo 1 | 1908 | 1920 | 3 |
| Steve Hegg | United States | M | road cycling 1, track cycling 1 | 1984 | 1996 | 2 |
| Hans Heinemann | Switzerland | M | road cycling 1, track cycling 1 | 1960 | 1964 | 2 |
| Greg Henderson | New Zealand | M | road cycling 1, track cycling 4 | 1996 | 2012 | 5 |
| William Henry | United Kingdom | M | swimming 1, water polo 1 | 1900 | 1900 | 1 |
| Henri Hébrard de Villeneuve | France | M | fencing 1, tennis 1 | 1900 | 1900 | 1 |
| Peter Hermann | Liechtenstein | M | road cycling 1, track cycling 1 | 1988 | 1988 | 1 |
| Otto Herschmann | Austrian Empire | M | swimming 1, fencing 1 | 1896 | 1912 | 2 |
| Fedor den Hertog | Netherlands | M | road cycling 2, track cycling 1 | 1968 | 1972 | 2 |
| Ryder Hesjedal | Canada | M | mountain bike cycling 1, road cycling 2 | 2004 | 2012 | 3 |
| David Hesser | United States | M | swimming 1, water polo 1 | 1904 | 1904 | 1 |
| Jan Hettema | South Africa | M | road cycling 1, track cycling 1 | 1956 | 1956 | 1 |
| Leopold Heuvelmans | Belgium | M | road cycling 1, track cycling 1 | 1964 | 1964 | 1 |
| Debbie Hill | United Kingdom (1976), Zimbabwe (1980) | F | diving 1, swimming 1 | 1976 | 1980 | 2 |
| Tamsin Hinchley | Australia | F | beach volleyball 2, volleyball 1 | 2000 | 2012 | 3 |
| Ho Kim Fai | Hong Kong | F | canoeing 1, rowing 1 | 1984 | 1992 | 2 |
| William Hoare | United Kingdom | M | diving 1, gymnastics 1 | 1908 | 1908 | 1 |
| Maurice Hochepied | France | M | swimming 1, water polo 1 | 1900 | 1900 | 1 |
| Henri Hoevenaers | Belgium | M | road cycling 1, track cycling 1 | 1924 | 1924 | 1 |
| Georg Hoffmann | German Empire | M | diving 1, swimming 1 | 1904 | 1904 | 1 |
| Fritz Hofmann | German Empire | M | athletics 1, gymnastics 1 | 1896 | 1896 | 1 |
| Torvald Högström | Finland | M | road cycling 1, track cycling 1 | 1948 | 1948 | 1 |
| Harlan Holden | United States | M | athletics 1, baseball 1 | 1912 | 1912 | 1 |
| Charles Holland | United Kingdom | M | road cycling 2, track cycling 1 | 1932 | 1936 | 2 |
| Frigyes Hollósi | Kingdom of Hungary | M | rowing 1, swimming 1 | 1924 | 1936 | 2 |
| Brian Holm | Denmark | M | road cycling 1, track cycling 1 | 1984 | 1996 | 2 |
| Poul Holm | Denmark | M | gymnastics 1, swimming 1 | 1908 | 1908 | 1 |
| Bohumil Honzátko | Bohemia (1908), Bohemia (1912), Czechoslovakia | M | athletics 2, gymnastics 2 | 1908 | 1924 | 3 |
| Jack Hoobin | Australia | M | road cycling 1, track cycling 1 | 1948 | 1948 | 1 |
| František Hoplíček | Czechoslovakia | M | art competitions 1, athletics 1 | 1920 | 1932 | 2 |
| George Horine | United States | M | athletics 1, baseball 1 | 1912 | 1912 | 1 |
| Stephanie Horner | Canada | F | marathon swimming 1, swimming 2 | 2008 | 2016 | 3 |
| Bill Horr | United States | M | athletics 1, tug or war 1 | 1908 | 1908 | 1 |
| Ramón Hoyos | Colombia | M | road cycling 2, track cycling 1 | 1956 | 1960 | 2 |
| Hsiao Mei-Yu | Chinese Taipei | F | road cycling 1, track cycling 2 | 2012 | 2016 | 2 |
| Hsu Jui-Te | Chinese Taipei | M | road cycling 1, track cycling 1 | 1988 | 1988 | 1 |
| Huang Chien-Lung | Chinese Taipei | M | judo 1, wrestling 1 | 1988 | 1996 | 2 |
| Bruno Hubschmid | Switzerland | M | road cycling 2, track cycling 1 | 1968 | 1972 | 2 |
| Francisco Huerta | Mexico | M | road cycling 2, track cycling 1 | 1972 | 1976 | 2 |
| Robert Hughes | United States | M | swimming 1, water polo 2 | 1952 | 1956 | 2 |
| Sonia Huguet | France | F | road cycling 1, track cycling 1 | 2004 | 2004 | 1 |
| Heikki Hulkkonen | Finland | M | fencing 2, modern pentathlon 2 | 1976 | 1980 | 2 |
| Frederick Humphreys | United Kingdom | M | tug of war 3, wrestling 1 | 1908 | 1920 | 3 |
| Edwin Hunter | United States | M | golf 1, tennis 1 | 1904 | 1904 | 1 |
| Risto Hurme | Finland | M | fencing 2, modern pentathlon 2 | 1972 | 1976 | 2 |
| Daud Ibrahim | Malaysia | M | road cycling 1, track cycling 1 | 1972 | 1972 | 1 |
| Piet Ikelaar | Netherlands | M | road cycling 1, track cycling 1 | 1920 | 1920 | 1 |
| Lenka Ilavská | Slovakia | F | mountain bike cycling 1, road cycling 1 | 1996 | 1996 | 1 |
| Matt Illingworth | United Kingdom | M | road cycling 1, track cycling 1 | 1992 | 1996 | 2 |
| Tauno Ilmoniemi | Finland | M | diving 1, gymnastics 1 | 1912 | 1912 | 1 |
| Fernando Inchauste | Bolivia | M | canoeing 2, shooting 1 | 1964 | 1972 | 3 |
| Albert Ireton | United Kingdom | M | boxing 1, tug of war 1 | 1908 | 1908 | 1 |
| Frank Irons | / United States | M | athletics 2, baseball 1 | 1908 | 1912 | 2 |
| Yusuke Ishijima | Japan | M | beach volleyball 1, volleyball 1 | 2008 | 2020 | 2 |
| Hans Jacobson | Sweden | M | fencing 2, modern pentathlon 1 | 1968 | 1980 | 3 |
| Jan Jankiewicz | Poland | M | road cycling 1, track cycling 1 | 1976 | 1980 | 2 |
| Bernard Janssens | Belgium | M | road cycling 1, track cycling 1 | 1920 | 1920 | 1 |
| Herold Jansson | Denmark | M | diving 2, gymnastics 1 | 1920 | 1924 | 2 |
| John January | United States | M | athletics 1, football 1 | 1904 | 1904 | 1 |
| Alex Jany | France | M | swimming 3, water polo 1 | 1948 | 1960 | 4 |
| Agata Jaroszek-Karczmarek | Poland | F | athletics 3, gymnastics 1 | 1980 | 1996 | 4 |
| John Jarvis | United Kingdom | M | swimming 3, water polo 1 | 1900 | 1908 | 3 |
| Jean Jenni | Switzerland | M | swimming 1, water polo 1 | 1920 | 1920 | 1 |
| Viggo Jensen | Denmark | M | athletics 1, gymnastics 1, shooting 2, weightlifting 1 | 1896 | 1900 | 2 |
| Realdo Jessurun | Suriname | M | road cycling 2, track cycling 1 | 1988 | 1992 | 2 |
| Greta Johansson | Sweden | F | diving 1, swimming 1 | 1912 | 1912 | 1 |
| Hjalmar Johansson | Sweden | M | diving 2, swimming 1 | 1908 | 1912 | 2 |
| Olle Johansson | Sweden | M | swimming 2, water polo 1 | 1948 | 1952 | 2 |
| Moesha Johnson | Australia | F | marathon swimming 1, swimming 1 | 2024 | 2024 | 1 |
| Tassy Johnson | Australia | M | road cycling 1, track cycling 1 | 1936 | 1936 | 1 |
| Garry Jones | Australia | M | road cycling 1, track cycling 1 | 1960 | 1960 | 1 |
| John Paul Jones | United States | M | athletics 1, baseball 1 | 1912 | 1912 | 1 |
| Louise Jones | United Kingdom | F | road cycling 1, track cycling 1 | 1988 | 1992 | 2 |
| Samuel Jones | United States | M | athletics 1, tug of war 1 | 1904 | 1904 | 1 |
| Abe Jonker | South Africa | M | road cycling 1, track cycling 2 | 1956 | 1960 | 2 |
| João Jório | Brazil | M | rowing 1, water polo 1 | 1920 | 1920 | 1 |
| Jóhannes Jósefsson | Denmark | M | glima 1, wrestling 1 | 1908 | 1908 | 1 |
| Harald Julin | Sweden | M | swimming 2, water polo 3 | 1908 | 1920 | 3 |
| Viviane Jungblut | Brazil | F | marathon swimming 1, swimming 1 | 2020 | 2024 | 2 |
| Juan Junqueras | Restoration (Spain) | M | athletics 1, field hockey 1 | 1924 | 1928 | 2 |
| Maximo Junta | Philippines | M | road cycling 1, track cycling 1 | 1972 | 1972 | 1 |
| František Jursa | Czechoslovakia | M | road cycling 1, track cycling 1 | 1956 | 1956 | 1 |
| Katarzyna Juszczak | Poland (1992), Italy | F | judo 1, wrestling 1 | 1992 | 2004 | 2 |
| Duke Kahanamoku | United States | M | swimming 3, water polo 1 | 1912 | 1924 | 3 |
| Maureen Kaila | El Salvador | F | road cycling 1, track cycling 2 | 1996 | 2000 | 2 |
| Kalle Kainuvaara | Finland (1912), Finland | M | diving 2, modern pentathlon 1 | 1912 | 1920 | 2 |
| Periklis Kakousis | Kingdom of Greece | M | tug of war 1, weightlifting 1 | 1904 | 1904 | 1 |
| Manthos Kaloudis | Kingdom of Greece | M | road cycling 1, track cycling 1 | 1948 | 1948 | 1 |
| Henry Kaltenbrunn | South Africa | M | road cycling 2, track cycling 2 | 1920 | 1924 | 2 |
| Nicolas Kanivé | Luxembourg | M | athletics 1, gymnastics 1 | 1912 | 1920 | 2 |
| Vladimir Karpets | Russia | M | road cycling 2, track cycling 1 | 2000 | 2008 | 3 |
| Artūras Kasputis | Soviet Union (1988), Lithuania | M | road cycling 2, track cycling 2 | 1988 | 2000 | 3 |
| Frank Kehoe | United States | M | diving 1, swimming 1, water polo 1 | 1904 | 1904 | 1 |
| Keisei Tominaga | Japan | M | basketball 1, basketball 3x3 1 | 2020 | 2024 | 2 |
| Fred Kelly | United States | M | athletics 1, baseball 1 | 1912 | 1912 | 1 |
| Johan Kemp | Finland | M | athletics 1, gymnastics 1 | 1908 | 1908 | 1 |
| Peter Kemp | United Kingdom | M | swimming 1, water polo 1 | 1900 | 1900 | 1 |
| Lauri Kettunen | Finland | M | fencing 1, modern pentathlon 2 | 1928 | 1936 | 2 |
| Abdul Rahman Khalid | Bahrain | M | fencing 1, modern pentathlon 1 | 1988 | 1988 | 1 |
| Mohamed Abdel Aziz Khalifa | Egypt | M | swimming 1, water polo 3 | 1948 | 1960 | 3 |
| Khem Son | Cambodia | M | road cycling 1, track cycling 1 | 1964 | 1964 | 1 |
| Taghikhan Khodavand | Iran | M | road cycling 1, track cycling 1 | 1972 | 1972 | 1 |
| Joanne Kiesanowski | New Zealand | F | road cycling 2, track cycling 1 | 2004 | 2012 | 3 |
| Kihei Tomioka | Japan | M | road cycling 1, track cycling 1 | 1952 | 1952 | 1 |
| Kim Yong-Mi | Korea | F | road cycling 1, track cycling 2 | 1996 | 2004 | 2 |
| Karch Kiraly | United States | M | beach volleyball 1, volleyball 2 | 1984 | 1996 | 3 |
| Morris Kirksey | United States | M | athletics 1, rugby 1 | 1920 | 1920 | 1 |
| Anastasiya Kirpichnikova | ROC, France (since 2023) | F | marathon swimming 1, swimming 2 | 2020 | 2024 | 2 |
| Vasil Kiryienka | Belarus | M | road cycling 3, track cycling 2 | 2004 | 2016 | 4 |
| Abel Kiviat | United States | M | athletics 1, baseball 1 | 1912 | 1912 | 1 |
| Truus Klapwijk | Netherlands | F | diving 2, swimming 1, water polo 1 | 1920 | 1928 | 3 |
| Michal Klasa | Czechoslovakia | M | road cycling 1, track cycling 1 | 1976 | 1980 | 2 |
| Lisa Klein | Germany | F | road cycling 1, track cycling 2 | 2020 | 2024 | 2 |
| Tanja Klein | Austria | F | road cycling 1, track cycling 1 | 1996 | 1996 | 1 |
| Harald Klem | Denmark | M | gymnastics 1, swimming 1 | 1908 | 1908 | 1 |
| Oliver Klemet | Germany | M | marathon swimming 1, swimming 1 | 2024 | 2024 | 1 |
| Servais Knaven | Netherlands | M | road cycling 1, track cycling 1 | 1992 | 2004 | 2 |
| Taylor Knibb | United States | F | road cycling 1, triathlon 2 | 2020 | 2024 | 2 |
| Annan Knudsen | Norway | M | rowing 1, sailing 1 | 1908 | 1920 | 2 |
| Knut Knudsen | Norway | M | road cycling 1, track cycling 2 | 1968 | 1972 | 2 |
| Kristel Köbrich | Chile | F | marathon swimming 1, swimming 6 | 2004 | 2024 | 6 |
| Sjaak Köhler | Netherlands | M | swimming 1, water polo 2 | 1924 | 1928 | 2 |
| Ignatas Konovalovas | Lithuania | M | road cycling 2, track cycling 1 | 2004 | 2016 | 3 |
| János Konrád | Hungary | M | swimming 1, water polo 3 | 1960 | 1968 | 3 |
| Aristidis Konstantinidis | Kingdom of Greece | M | road cycling 1, track cycling 1 | 1896 | 1896 | 1 |
| Konstantinos Konstantinou | Kingdom of Greece | M | road cycling 1, track cycling 1 | 1896 | 1896 | 1 |
| Gholam Hossein Koohi | Iran | M | road cycling 2, track cycling 2 | 1972 | 1976 | 2 |
| Lotte Kopecky | Belgium | F | road cycling 3, track cycling 2 | 2016 | 2024 | 3 |
| Charles Kopp | Switzerland | M | swimming 1, water polo 1 | 1924 | 1924 | 1 |
| Wäinö Korhonen | Finland | M | fencing 1, modern pentathlon 1 | 1956 | 1956 | 1 |
| Radim Kořínek | Czech Republic | M | mountain bike cycling 2, road cycling 1 | 2000 | 2004 | 2 |
| Erkki Koskinen | Finland | M | road cycling 1, track cycling 1 | 1948 | 1948 | 1 |
| Ragnhild Kostøl | Norway | F | mountain bike cycling 1, road cycling 1 | 1996 | 2000 | 2 |
| Boyan Kotsev | Bulgaria | M | road cycling 2, track cycling 1 | 1952 | 1960 | 2 |
| Mikhail Kountras | Greece | M | road cycling 1, track cycling 1 | 1976 | 1976 | 1 |
| Lada Kozlíková | Czech Republic | F | road cycling 1, track cycling 3 | 2000 | 2008 | 3 |
| Roswitha Krause | East Germany | F | handball 2, swimming 1 | 1968 | 1980 | 3 |
| Karl Krenauer | Austria | M | road cycling 1, track cycling 1 | 1984 | 1984 | 1 |
| Mieke Kröger | Germany | F | road cycling 1, track cycling 3 | 2016 | 2024 | 3 |
| Eugène Kuborn | Luxembourg | M | swimming 2, water polo 1 | 1924 | 1928 | 2 |
| Erol Küçükbakırcı | Turkey | M | road cycling 1, track cycling 1 | 1972 | 1976 | 2 |
| Frank Kugler | United States | M | tug of war 1, weightlifting 1, wrestling 1 | 1904 | 1904 | 1 |
| Murugayan Kumaresan | Malaysia | M | road cycling 2, track cycling 2 | 1988 | 1992 | 2 |
| Torsten Kumfeldt | Sweden | M | swimming 1, water polo 3 | 1908 | 1920 | 3 |
| Émile Lachapelle | Switzerland | M | rowing 1, sailing 1 | 1924 | 1948 | 2 |
| Susanne Lahme | East Germany (1988), Germany | F | beach volleyball 1, volleyball 3 | 1988 | 2004 | 4 |
| Ivo Lakučs | Latvia | M | BMX racing cycling 1, track cycling 1 | 2000 | 2008 | 2 |
| Ioannis Lambrou | Kingdom of Greece | M | athletics 1, basketball 1 | 1948 | 1952 | 2 |
| Czesław Lang | Poland | M | road cycling 1, track cycling 1 | 1976 | 1980 | 2 |
| István Lang | Hungary | M | road cycling 1, track cycling 1 | 1952 | 1952 | 1 |
| Malcolm Lange | South Africa | M | road cycling 1, track cycling 1 | 1992 | 1992 | 1 |
| Guy Lapébie | France | M | road cycling 1, track cycling 1 | 1936 | 1936 | 1 |
| Joe Laporte | Canada | M | road cycling 2, track cycling 1 | 1924 | 1928 | 2 |
| Olavi Larkas | Finland | M | fencing 1, modern pentathlon 1 | 1948 | 1948 | 1 |
| Dezső Lauber | Kingdom of Hungary | M | art competitions 1, tennis 1 | 1908 | 1924 | 2 |
| Louis Laufray | France | M | swimming 1, water polo 1 | 1900 | 1900 | 1 |
| André Laurent | Belgium | M | swimming 1, water polo 2 | 1952 | 1964 | 3 |
| Radcliffe Lawrence | Jamaica | M | road cycling 1, track cycling 1 | 1972 | 1972 | 1 |
| Georg de Laval | Sweden | M | modern pentathlon 1, shooting 1 | 1912 | 1912 | 1 |
| Patrik de Laval | Sweden | M | modern pentathlon 1, shooting 1 | 1912 | 1912 | 1 |
| Michael Lecky | Jamaica | M | road cycling 1, track cycling 1 | 1972 | 1972 | 1 |
| Jean Leclerq | France | M | swimming 1, water polo 1 | 1900 | 1900 | 1 |
| Léon Lécuyer | France | M | fencing 1, shooting 1 | 1900 | 1908 | 2 |
| Lee Sze Wing | Hong Kong | F | road cycling 1, track cycling 1 | 2024 | 2024 | 1 |
| Marrit Leenstra | Netherlands | F | beach volleyball 1, volleyball 1 | 1996 | 2004 | 2 |
| Herman van Leeuwen | Netherlands | M | athletics 1, gymnastics 1 | 1908 | 1908 | 1 |
| André Lepère | France | M | road cycling 1, track cycling 1 | 1908 | 1912 | 2 |
| Albin Lermusiaux | France | M | athletics 1, shooting 1 | 1896 | 1896 | 1 |
| Georges Leuillieux | France | M | swimming 1, water polo 1 | 1900 | 1900 | 1 |
| Lê Văn Phước | Vietnam | M | road cycling 1, track cycling 1 | 1952 | 1952 | 1 |
| Charles Jacques Le Vavasseur | France | M | equestrian eventing 1, modern pentathlon 2 | 1924 | 1928 | 2 |
| Maximilian Levy | Germany | M | road cycling 1, track cycling 4 | 2008 | 2020 | 4 |
| Gustaf Lewenhaupt | Sweden | M | equestrian 1, modern pentathlon 1 | 1912 | 1912 | 1 |
| Laddie Lewis | Guyana | M | road cycling 1, track cycling 1 | 1948 | 1948 | 1 |
| Gustav Lexau | German Empire | M | swimming 1, water polo 1 | 1900 | 1900 | 1 |
| Li Wenkai | China | M | road cycling 1, track cycling 1 | 1992 | 1992 | 1 |
| Peter Lichtner-Hoyer | Austria | M | equestrian 1, modern pentathlon 1 | 1956 | 1960 | 2 |
| Hans Lienhart | Austria | M | road cycling 3, track cycling 1 | 1980 | 1988 | 3 |
| José Carlos de Lima | Brazil | M | road cycling 1, track cycling 1 | 1980 | 1980 | 1 |
| Edward Lindberg | United States | M | athletics 1, baseball 1 | 1912 | 1912 | 1 |
| Kurt Lindeman | Finland | M | fencing 2, modern pentathlon 1 | 1952 | 1960 | 2 |
| Bo Lindman | Sweden | M | fencing 1, modern pentathlon 3 | 1924 | 1932 | 3 |
| Edmund Lindmark | Sweden | M | diving 2, gymnastics 1 | 1920 | 1928 | 3 |
| Robert Lips | Switzerland | M | art competitions 2, fencing 1 | 1936 | 1948 | 2 |
| István Liszkay | Kingdom of Hungary | M | road cycling 1, track cycling 1 | 1936 | 1936 | 1 |
| Bengt Ljungquist | Sweden | M | equestrian 1, fencing 4 | 1936 | 1964 | 5 |
| Neil Lloyd | Antigua and Barbuda | M | road cycling 1, track cycling 2 | 1988 | 1992 | 2 |
| Luboš Lom | Czechoslovakia | M | road cycling 1, track cycling 1 | 1988 | 1988 | 1 |
| Jeannie Longo | France | F | road cycling 7, track cycling 1 | 1984 | 2008 | 7 |
| Fernando Louro | Brazil | M | road cycling 2, track cycling 3 | 1980 | 1992 | 3 |
| Eva Loweová-Orvošová | Slovakia | F | mountain bike cycling 1, road cycling 1 | 1996 | 1996 | 1 |
| Olaf Ludwig | East Germany (1980, 1988), Germany | M | road cycling 3, track cycling 1 | 1980 | 1996 | 3 |
| Eskil Lundahl | Sweden | M | art competitions 1, swimming 2 | 1928 | 1948 | 3 |
| Karoliina Lundahl | Finland | F | athletics 1, weightlifting 1 | 1996 | 2000 | 2 |
| György Luntzer | Kingdom of Hungary | M | athletics 2, wrestling 1 | 1908 | 1912 | 2 |
| Remigijus Lupeikis | Lithuania | M | road cycling 2, track cycling 1 | 1996 | 2000 | 2 |
| Thomas Lurz | Germany | M | marathon swimming 2, swimming 1 | 2004 | 2012 | 3 |
| Joe Lydon | United States | M | athletics 1, boxing 1, football 1 | 1904 | 1904 | 1 |
| Marianna Lymperta | Greece | F | marathon swimming 2, swimming 2 | 2000 | 2012 | 4 |
| Neil Lyster | New Zealand | M | road cycling 1, track cycling 1 | 1968 | 1972 | 2 |
| Jan Maas | Netherlands | M | road cycling 1, track cycling 2 | 1924 | 1928 | 2 |
| Peter Macken | Australia | M | fencing 1, modern pentathlon 5 | 1960 | 1976 | 5 |
| Fernando Madeira | Portugal | M | swimming 1, water polo 1 | 1952 | 1952 | 1 |
| Mohamed Madkour | Egypt | M | road cycling 1, track cycling 1 | 1924 | 1924 | 1 |
| Jules Maenen | Netherlands | M | road cycling 1, track cycling 1 | 1952 | 1952 | 1 |
| Ivano Maffei | Italy | M | road cycling 1, track cycling 1 | 1980 | 1980 | 1 |
| Muhammad Naqi Mallick | Pakistan | M | road cycling 2, track cycling 3 | 1948 | 1956 | 3 |
| Gary Mandy | Zimbabwe | M | road cycling 1, track cycling 1 | 1988 | 1988 | 1 |
| Miltiades Manno | Kingdom of Hungary | M | art competitions 1, rowing 1 | 1912 | 1932 | 2 |
| Mai Yamamoto | Japan | F | basketball 1, basketball 3x3 1 | 2020 | 2024 | 2 |
| Isaac Mansoor | India | M | swimming 2, water polo 2 | 1948 | 1952 | 2 |
| Louis Marc | France | M | swimming 1, water polo 1 | 1900 | 1900 | 1 |
| Rudolf Maresch | Austria | M | road cycling 1, track cycling 1 | 1956 | 1956 | 1 |
| Fred Markus | Canada | M | road cycling 1, track cycling 1 | 1956 | 1956 | 1 |
| Michael Markussen | Denmark | M | road cycling 1, track cycling 1 | 1980 | 1984 | 2 |
| Leonie Märtens | Germany | F | marathon swimming 1, swimming 1 | 2024 | 2024 | 1 |
| Ernest Martin | France | M | swimming 1, water polo 1 | 1900 | 1900 | 1 |
| Louis Martin | France | M | swimming 1, water polo 1 | 1900 | 1900 | 1 |
| Oliver Martin | United States | M | road cycling 1, track cycling 1 | 1964 | 1968 | 2 |
| Paul Martin | Switzerland | M | art competitions 1, athletics 5 | 1920 | 1936 | 5 |
| Eduardo Martínez | Argentina | M | beach volleyball 2, volleyball 2 | 1984 | 2000 | 4 |
| Sergio Martínez | Cuba | M | road cycling 1, track cycling 1 | 1968 | 1968 | 1 |
| António Martins | Portugal | M | athletics 1, shooting 2 | 1920 | 1924 | 2 |
| Jean de Mas Latrie | France | M | fencing 1, modern pentathlon 1 | 1908 | 1912 | 2 |
| Mario Masanés | Chile | M | road cycling 1, track cycling 1 | 1948 | 1948 | 1 |
| Hernán Masanés | Chile | M | road cycling 1, track cycling 2 | 1952 | 1956 | 2 |
| Masayoshi Uchida | Japan | M | diving 1, swimming 1 | 1920 | 1920 | 1 |
| Masazumi Tajima | Japan | M | road cycling 1, track cycling 1 | 1952 | 1952 | 1 |
| Mauricio Mata | Mexico | M | road cycling 1, track cycling 1 | 1960 | 1960 | 1 |
| Patrick Matt | Liechtenstein | M | road cycling 1, track cycling 2 | 1988 | 1992 | 2 |
| Faidon Matthaiou | Kingdom of Greece | M | basketball 1, rowing 1 | 1948 | 1952 | 2 |
| Sergiy Matveyev | Ukraine | M | road cycling 1, track cycling 3 | 1996 | 2004 | 3 |
| Albert Mayaud | France | M | swimming 1, water polo 2 | 1920 | 1924 | 2 |
| José Mazzini | Peru | M | road cycling 1, track cycling 1 | 1936 | 1936 | 1 |
| Walter McClure | United States | M | athletics 1, baseball 1 | 1912 | 1912 | 1 |
| Mike McDermott | United States | M | swimming 2, water polo 1 | 1912 | 1920 | 2 |
| Herbert McDonald | Canada | M | road cycling 1, track cycling 1 | 1920 | 1920 | 1 |
| Perry McGillivray | United States | M | swimming 2, water polo 1 | 1912 | 1920 | 2 |
| Matt McGrath | / United States | M | athletics 4, tug of war 1 | 1908 | 1924 | 4 |
| Yvonne McGregor | United Kingdom | F | road cycling 2, track cycling 2 | 1996 | 2000 | 2 |
| Scott McGrory | Australia | M | road cycling 1, track cycling 2 | 1988 | 2000 | 2 |
| Ralph McKittrick | United States | M | golf 1, tennis 1 | 1904 | 1904 | 1 |
| Ralph Mecredy | United Kingdom | M | polo bicycle 1, road cycling 1 | 1908 | 1912 | 2 |
| José Medina | Chile | M | road cycling 1, track cycling 1 | 1996 | 2000 | 2 |
| Raj Kumar Mehra | India | M | road cycling 2, track cycling 1 | 1948 | 1952 | 2 |
| Eduard Meijer | Netherlands | M | swimming 2, water polo 1 | 1900 | 1908 | 2 |
| Naji El-Mekki | Morocco | M | modern pentathlon 1, shooting 1 | 1960 | 1960 | 1 |
| Nikolaos Melanofeidis | Kingdom of Greece | M | swimming 1, water polo 1 | 1948 | 1948 | 1 |
| Ícaro Mello | Brazil | M | art competitions 1, athletics 1 | 1936 | 1952 | 2 |
| Oussama Mellouli | Tunisia | M | marathon swimming 3, swimming 5 | 2000 | 2020 | 6 |
| Alexis Méndez | Venezuela | M | road cycling 1, track cycling 1 | 1988 | 2000 | 2 |
| Roberto Menéndez | Cuba | M | road cycling 3, track cycling 2 | 1968 | 1976 | 3 |
| Din Meraj | Pakistan | M | road cycling 1, track cycling 1 | 1956 | 1956 | 1 |
| Leroy Mercer | United States | M | athletics 1, baseball 1 | 1912 | 1912 | 1 |
| Désiré Mérchez | France | M | swimming 1, water polo 1 | 1900 | 1900 | 1 |
| Leonard Meredith | United Kingdom | M | road cycling 2, track cycling 1 | 1908 | 1920 | 3 |
| Daniel Mérillon | France | M | gymnastics 1, shooting 2 | 1900 | 1912 | 3 |
| Juan Alberto Merlos | Argentina | M | road cycling 1, track cycling 2 | 1964 | 1968 | 2 |
| Herman Meyboom | Belgium | M | swimming 2, water polo 2 | 1908 | 1912 | 2 |
| John Meyers | United States | M | swimming 1, water polo 1 | 1904 | 1904 | 1 |
| Sydney Middleton | Australasia | M | rowing 1, rugby 1 | 1908 | 1912 | 2 |
| Graeme Miller | New Zealand | M | road cycling 2, track cycling 1 | 1984 | 1992 | 3 |
| Xavier Mirander | Jamaica | M | road cycling 1, track cycling 1 | 1972 | 1976 | 2 |
| James Mitchel | United States | M | athletics 1, tug of war 1 | 1904 | 1904 | 1 |
| Hylton Mitchell | Trinidad and Tobago | M | road cycling 1, track cycling 1 | 1956 | 1956 | 1 |
| Kyoshi Miura | Japan | M | mountain bike cycling 1, road cycling 1 | 1988 | 1996 | 2 |
| Russell Mockridge | Australia | M | road cycling 1, track cycling 2 | 1948 | 1952 | 2 |
| Nicolaas Moerloos | Belgium | M | gymnastics 1, weightlifting 1 | 1920 | 1924 | 2 |
| Krisztina Molnár | Hungary | F | athletics 2, gymnastics 1 | 1992 | 2008 | 3 |
| Thomas Montemage | /United States | M | road cycling 1, track cycling 2 | 1948 | 1964 | 3 |
| John Montgomery | United States | M | equestrian 1, polo 1 | 1912 | 1920 | 2 |
| Fernand de Montigny | Belgium | M | fencing 4, field hockey 1 | 1908 | 1924 | 4 |
| Antonio Montilla | Venezuela | M | road cycling 1, track cycling 1 | 1956 | 1956 | 1 |
| Jorge Moreau | Argentina | M | swimming 1, water polo 1 | 1924 | 1928 | 2 |
| Federico Moreira | Uruguay | M | road cycling 1, track cycling 1 | 1988 | 1992 | 2 |
| Michael Mørkøv | Denmark | M | road cycling 1, track cycling 4 | 2008 | 2024 | 4 |
| Harry Morris | Australia | M | diving 1, wrestling 1 | 1928 | 1928 | 1 |
| Charles Morton | United States | M | road cycling 1, track cycling 1 | 1936 | 1936 | 1 |
| Henri Mouillefarine | France | M | road cycling 1, track cycling 1 | 1932 | 1932 | 1 |
| Roberto Muñoz | Chile | M | road cycling 1, track cycling 1 | 1984 | 1984 | 1 |
| Kabange Mupopo | Zambia | F | athletics 1, football 1 | 2016 | 2024 | 2 |
| Racheal Nachula | Zambia | F | athletics 1, football 1 | 2008 | 2024 | 2 |
| Sachin Nag | India | M | swimming 1, water polo 2 | 1948 | 1952 | 2 |
| Richard Nagy | Slovakia | M | marathon swimming 1, swimming 2 | 2016 | 2020 | 2 |
| Jolanda Neff | Switzerland | F | mountain bike cycling 2, road cycling 1 | 2016 | 2020 | 2 |
| Frank Nelson | United States | M | athletics 1, baseball 1 | 1912 | 1912 | 1 |
| Jacqui Nelson | New Zealand | F | road cycling 1, track cycling 2 | 1992 | 1996 | 2 |
| Peter Nelson | Australia | M | road cycling 1, track cycling 1 | 1952 | 1952 | 1 |
| Boris Nepokupnoy | Russian Empire | M | fencing 1, modern pentathlon 1 | 1912 | 1912 | 1 |
| Jim Nestor | Australia | M | road cycling 2, track cycling 1 | 1948 | 1956 | 2 |
| Jim Nevin | Australia | M | road cycling 2, track cycling 1 | 1952 | 1956 | 2 |
| Fenella Ng | Hong Kong, Hong Kong (2000) | F | rowing 1, swimming 2 | 1984 | 2000 | 3 |
| Ng Joo Pong | Malaysia | M | road cycling 2, track cycling 1 | 1964 | 1968 | 2 |
| Holger Nielsen | Denmark | M | athletics 1, fencing 1, shooting 1 | 1896 | 1896 | 1 |
| Ilmari Niemeläinen | Finland | M | art competitions 1, diving 2 | 1936 | 1948 | 2 |
| Veli Nieminen | Finland (1908), Finland | M | gymnastics 1, shooting 2 | 1908 | 1924 | 3 |
| Apostolos Nikolaidis | Kingdom of Greece | M | athletics 1, football 1 | 1920 | 1920 | 1 |
| August Nilsson | Sweden | M | athletics 1, tug of war 1 | 1900 | 1900 | 1 |
| Adrien Niyonshuti | Rwanda | M | mountain bike cycling 1, road cycling 1 | 2012 | 2016 | 2 |
| Evan Noel | United Kingdom | M | jeu de paume 1, racquets 1 | 1908 | 1908 | 1 |
| Daniel Norling | Sweden | M | gymnastics 2, jumping equestrian 1 | 1908 | 1920 | 3 |
| Jiří Nouza | Czechoslovakia | M | road cycling 1, track cycling 1 | 1956 | 1956 | 1 |
| Mieczysław Nowicki | Poland | M | road cycling 1, track cycling 1 | 1972 | 1976 | 2 |
| Reinder Nummerdor | Netherlands | M | beach volleyball 3, volleyball 2 | 2000 | 2016 | 5 |
| Jeff Nygaard | United States | M | beach volleyball 1, volleyball 2 | 1996 | 2004 | 3 |
| Paul Nyman | Finland | M | road cycling 3, track cycling 3 | 1952 | 1960 | 3 |
| Wallace O'Connor | United States | M | swimming 1, water polo 4 | 1924 | 1936 | 4 |
| Stuart O'Grady | Australia | M | road cycling 4, track cycling 4 | 1992 | 2012 | 6 |
| Wesley Oler | United States | M | athletics 1, baseball 1 | 1912 | 1912 | 1 |
| Gösta Olson | Sweden | M | fencing 1, gymnastics 1 | 1908 | 1908 | 1 |
| Oscar Olson | United States | M | tug of war 1, weightlifting 1 | 1904 | 1904 | 1 |
| Piet Ooms | Netherlands | M | swimming 1, water polo 1 | 1908 | 1908 | 1 |
| Jiří Opavský | Czechoslovakia | M | road cycling 1, track cycling 1 | 1956 | 1956 | 1 |
| William R. Orthwein | United States | M | swimming 1, water polo 1 | 1904 | 1904 | 1 |
| Tetsuo Osawa | Japan | M | road cycling 1, track cycling 2 | 1956 | 1960 | 2 |
| Zbigniew Pacelt | Poland | M | modern pentathlon 1, swimming 2 | 1968 | 1976 | 3 |
| Henri Padou | France | M | swimming 2, water polo 4 | 1920 | 1936 | 4 |
| Duncan Page | Australia | M | fencing 1, modern pentathlon 2 | 1964 | 1968 | 2 |
| Gregorio Paltrinieri | Italy | M | marathon swimming 2, swimming 4 | 2012 | 2024 | 4 |
| Nikolai Panin | Russian Empire | M | figure skating 1, shooting 1 | 1908 | 1912 | 2 |
| Raoul Paoli | France | M | athletics 4, rowing 1, wrestling 1 | 1900 | 1928 | 5 |
| Georgios Papasideris | Kingdom of Greece | M | athletics 1, weightlifting 1 | 1896 | 1896 | 1 |
| Georgios Paraskevopoulos | Kingdom of Greece | M | road cycling 1, track cycling 1 | 1896 | 1896 | 1 |
| Park Min-Su | Korea | M | road cycling 1, track cycling 2 | 1988 | 1996 | 3 |
| Jules Patou | Belgium | M | road cycling 1, track cycling 1 | 1908 | 1912 | 2 |
| Cassie Patten | United Kingdom | F | marathon swimming 1, swimming 1 | 2008 | 2008 | 1 |
| Norman Patterson | United States | M | athletics 1, baseball 1 | 1912 | 1912 | 1 |
| Ana Paula Connelly | Brazil | F | beach volleyball 2, volleyball 2 | 1992 | 2008 | 4 |
| Keri-Anne Payne | United Kingdom | F | marathon swimming 3, swimming 1 | 2008 | 2016 | 3 |
| Jana Pechanová | Czech Republic | F | marathon swimming 3, swimming 1 | 2004 | 2016 | 4 |
| William Peden | Canada | M | road cycling 1, track cycling 1 | 1928 | 1928 | 1 |
| Bent Pedersen | Denmark | M | road cycling 1, track cycling 1 | 1972 | 1976 | 2 |
| Jørgen V. Pedersen | Denmark | M | road cycling 1, track cycling 1 | 1980 | 1984 | 2 |
| Waldemar Pedrazzi | Uruguay | M | road cycling 1, track cycling 1 | 1976 | 1976 | 1 |
| Jussi Pelli | Finland | M | fencing 1, modern pentathlon 3 | 1976 | 1984 | 3 |
| Vane Pennell | United Kingdom | M | jeu de paume 1, racquets 1 | 1908 | 1908 | 1 |
| António Pereira | Portugal | M | weightlifting 2, wrestling 1 | 1912 | 1928 | 3 |
| Dania Pérez | Cuba | F | road cycling 2, track cycling 1 | 1996 | 2000 | 2 |
| José Pérez | Mexico | M | fencing 1, modern pentathlon 3 | 1952 | 1960 | 3 |
| Marlon Pérez | Colombia | M | road cycling 1, track cycling 2 | 1996 | 2004 | 3 |
| Nova Peris | Australia | F | athletics 1, field hockey 1 | 1996 | 2000 | 2 |
| Đorđe Perišić | Yugoslavia | M | swimming 1, water polo 2 | 1960 | 1972 | 3 |
| Gösta Persson | Sweden | M | swimming 1, water polo 2 | 1924 | 1936 | 2 |
| Karel Pešek | Czechoslovakia | M | football 2, ice hockey 1 | 1920 | 1924 | 2 |
| Paul Pesthy | United States | M | fencing 3, modern pentathlon 1 | 1964 | 1976 | 3 |
| Rebecca Petch | New Zealand | F | BMX cycling 1, track cycling 1 | 2020 | 2024 | 2 |
| Percy Peter | United Kingdom | M | swimming 3, water polo 1 | 1920 | 1928 | 3 |
| Robert Peters | Antigua and Barbuda | M | road cycling 1, track cycling 1 | 1992 | 1992 | 1 |
| Aristovoulos Petmezas | Kingdom of Greece | M | gymnastics 1, shooting 1 | 1896 | 1896 | 1 |
| Imre Petneházy | Kingdom of Hungary | M | fencing 1, modern pentathlon 1 | 1932 | 1932 | 1 |
| Georgios Petropoulos | Kingdom of Greece | M | fencing 1, shooting 1 | 1912 | 1912 | 1 |
| Erik Pettersson | Sweden | M | road cycling 2, track cycling 1 | 1964 | 1968 | 2 |
| Gösta Pettersson | Sweden | M | road cycling 3, track cycling 1 | 1960 | 1968 | 3 |
| Sven-Pelle Pettersson | Sweden | M | swimming 2, water polo 1 | 1928 | 1936 | 2 |
| Sture Pettersson | Sweden | M | road cycling 2, track cycling 1 | 1964 | 1968 | 2 |
| Tomas Pettersson | Sweden | M | road cycling 1, track cycling 1 | 1968 | 1968 | 1 |
| Sigurjón Pétursson | Denmark/ Iceland | M | glima 2, wrestling 1 | 1908 | 1912 | 2 |
| Taylor Phinney | United States | M | road cycling 2, track cycling 1 | 2008 | 2016 | 3 |
| Tom Pidcock | United Kingdom | M | road cycling 1, mountain bike cycling 2 | 2020 | 2024 | 2 |
| Andreína Pinto | Venezuela | F | marathon swimming 1, swimming 3 | 2008 | 2016 | 3 |
| Yanel Pinto | Venezuela | F | marathon swimming 1, swimming 1 | 2008 | 2012 | 2 |
| Álvaro Pires | Brazil | M | swimming 1, water polo 1 | 1964 | 1968 | 2 |
| Jan Plantaz | Netherlands | M | road cycling 1, track cycling 1 | 1952 | 1952 | 1 |
| Luke Plapp | Australia | M | road cycling 1, track cycling 1 | 2020 | 2024 | 2 |
| Alexandr Pliuschin | Republic of Moldova | M | road cycling 1, track cycling 1 | 2008 | 2008 | 1 |
| Katherine Plouffe | Canada | F | basketball 1, basketball 3x3 1 | 2016 | 2024 | 2 |
| Michelle Plouffe | Canada | F | basketball 2, basketball 3x3 1 | 2012 | 2024 | 3 |
| Kelsey Plum | United States | F | basketball 1, basketball 3x3 1 | 2020 | 2024 | 2 |
| Rainer Podlesch | West Germany | M | road cycling 1, track cycling 1 | 1968 | 1972 | 2 |
| Josef Pohnetal | Austria | M | road cycling 1, track cycling 1 | 1948 | 1948 | 1 |
| Julio Polet | Argentina | M | road cycling 1, track cycling 1 | 1924 | 1924 | 1 |
| Herbert Polzhuber | Austria | M | fencing 4, modern pentathlon 1 | 1964 | 1976 | 4 |
| Jarrod Poort | Australia | M | marathon swimming 1, swimming 1 | 2012 | 2016 | 2 |
| Dušan Popeskov | IOP | M | road cycling 1, track cycling 1 | 1992 | 1992 | 1 |
| Paul Popp | Austria | M | road cycling 1, track cycling 1 | 1984 | 1984 | 1 |
| Thor Porko | Finland | M | road cycling 1, track cycling 1 | 1936 | 1936 | 1 |
| Francesco Postiglione | Italy | M | swimming 1, water polo 3 | 1992 | 2004 | 4 |
| Beth Potter | United Kingdom | F | athletics 1, triathlon 1 | 2016 | 2024 | 2 |
| Léon Pottier | Belgium | M | athletics 1, wrestling 1 | 1920 | 1924 | 2 |
| Kenneth Powell | United Kingdom | M | athletics 2, tennis 1 | 1908 | 1912 | 2 |
| Johan Praem | Denmark | M | fencing 1, rowing 1 | 1912 | 1928 | 2 |
| Eduardo Prieto | Mexico | M | fencing 1, sailing 1 | 1932 | 1964 | 2 |
| Troy Prinsloo | South Africa | M | marathon swimming 1, swimming 1 | 2008 | 2012 | 2 |
| Panagiotis Provatopoulos | Kingdom of Greece | M | swimming 1, water polo 1 | 1936 | 1948 | 2 |
| Susy Pryde | New Zealand | F | mountain bike cycling 1, road cycling 2 | 1996 | 2000 | 2 |
| Peter Pryor | Australia | M | road cycling 1, track cycling 1 | 1952 | 1952 | 1 |
| Paolo Pucci | Italy | M | swimming 1, water polo 1 | 1956 | 1956 | 1 |
| Eduardo Puertollano | Uruguay | M | road cycling 1, track cycling 1 | 1956 | 1956 | 1 |
| Lance Pugh | Canada | M | road cycling 1, track cycling 1 | 1948 | 1948 | 1 |
| Armand Putzeys | Belgium | M | road cycling 1, track cycling 1 | 1936 | 1936 | 1 |
| Milan Puzrla | Czechoslovakia | M | road cycling 1, track cycling 2 | 1968 | 1976 | 3 |
| Roberto Queralt | Spain | M | swimming 1, water polo 1 | 1952 | 1952 | 1 |
| Erich Rademacher | Weimar Republic | M | swimming 1, water polo 2 | 1928 | 1932 | 2 |
| Paul Radmilovic | United Kingdom | M | swimming 2, water polo 5 | 1908 | 1928 | 5 |
| Lovro Radonić | Yugoslavia | M | swimming 1, water polo 2 | 1952 | 1960 | 3 |
| Behrouz Rahbar | Iran | M | road cycling 1, track cycling 1 | 1972 | 1972 | 1 |
| Friedrich Wilhelm Rahe | German Empire | M | field hockey 1, tennis 1 | 1908 | 1908 | 1 |
| Oscar van Rappard | Netherlands | M | athletics 2, football 1 | 1920 | 1924 | 2 |
| Svante Rasmuson | Sweden | M | modern pentathlon 3, swimming 1 | 1976 | 1988 | 4 |
| Michael Rasmussen | Denmark | M | mountain bike cycling 1, road cycling 1 | 2000 | 2004 | 2 |
| Kristóf Rasovszky | Hungary | M | marathon swimming 2, swimming 1 | 2016 | 2024 | 3 |
| Peter Ratican | United States | M | athletics 1, football 1 | 1904 | 1904 | 1 |
| Michel Ravarino | Monaco | M | art competitions 1, shooting 3 | 1928 | 1960 | 4 |
| Katherine Rawls | United States | F | diving 2, swimming 1 | 1932 | 1936 | 2 |
| Harold Rayner | United States | M | fencing 3, modern pentathlon 1 | 1912 | 1928 | 3 |
| Kensley Reece | Barbados | M | road cycling 2, track cycling 2 | 1968 | 1972 | 2 |
| Frantz Reichel | France | M | athletics 1, rugby 1 | 1896 | 1900 | 2 |
| Paul Réneau | Belize | M | athletics 1, track cycling 1 | 1984 | 1988 | 2 |
| Amedee Reyburn | United States | M | swimming 1, water polo 1 | 1904 | 1904 | 1 |
| Joseph Reynders | Belgium | M | swimming 1, water polo 1 | 1948 | 1952 | 2 |
| František Řezáč | Czechoslovakia | M | road cycling 1, track cycling 2 | 1964 | 1968 | 2 |
| David Rhoads | United States | M | road cycling 2, track cycling 1 | 1952 | 1956 | 2 |
| Michael Rich | West Germany (1988), Germany | M | road cycling 3, track cycling 1 | 1988 | 2004 | 4 |
| Scott Richardson | South Africa | M | road cycling 1, track cycling 1 | 1992 | 1992 | 1 |
| Aubrey Richmond | Guyana | M | road cycling 1, track cycling 2 | 1984 | 1992 | 2 |
| René Ricolfi-Doria | Switzerland | M | swimming 1, water polo 1 | 1920 | 1920 | 1 |
| Manuel Riquelme | Chile | M | road cycling 1, track cycling 1 | 1936 | 1936 | 1 |
| Werner Riebenbauer | Austria | M | road cycling 1, track cycling 1 | 1996 | 2000 | 2 |
| Georges Rigal | France | M | swimming 1, water polo 2 | 1912 | 1924 | 2 |
| Aileen Riggin | United States | F | diving 2, swimming 1 | 1920 | 1924 | 2 |
| Clyde Rimple | British West Indies | M | road cycling 1, track cycling 1 | 1960 | 1960 | 1 |
| Éva Risztov | Hungary | F | marathon swimming 2, swimming 4 | 2000 | 2016 | 4 |
| Domingo Rivas | Venezuela | M | road cycling 1, track cycling 1 | 1956 | 1956 | 1 |
| Glen Robbins | Canada | M | road cycling 1, track cycling 1 | 1932 | 1932 | 1 |
| George S. Robertson | United Kingdom | M | athletics 1, tennis 1 | 1896 | 1896 | 1 |
| Fiona Robinson-Hannan | Australia | F | basketball 1, handball 1 | 1996 | 2000 | 2 |
| Rodolfo Rodino | Uruguay | M | road cycling 1, track cycling 1 | 1960 | 1960 | 1 |
| Martín Emilio Rodríguez | Colombia | M | road cycling 2, track cycling 2 | 1964 | 1968 | 2 |
| Sérgio Rodrigues | Brazil | M | swimming 1, water polo 1 | 1948 | 1952 | 2 |
| Mick Rogers | Australia | M | road cycling 3, track cycling 1 | 2000 | 2012 | 4 |
| Ante Roje | Yugoslavia | M | swimming 1, water polo 1 | 1924 | 1936 | 2 |
| Rebecca Romero | United Kingdom | F | rowing 1, track cycling 1 | 2004 | 2008 | 2 |
| Elsbeth van Rooy-Vink | Netherlands | F | mountain bike cycling 3, road cycling 1 | 1996 | 2008 | 3 |
| Bojan Ropret | Yugoslavia | M | road cycling 2, track cycling 1 | 1976 | 1984 | 3 |
| Ralph Rose | // United States | M | athletics 3, tug of war 1 | 1904 | 1912 | 3 |
| Arulraj Rosli | Malaysia | M | road cycling 1, track cycling 1 | 1964 | 1964 | 1 |
| Norman Ross | United States | M | swimming 1, water polo 1 | 1920 | 1920 | 1 |
| Petra Roßner | East Germany (1988), Germany | F | road cycling 3, track cycling 1 | 1988 | 2000 | 3 |
| Aristeidis Roubanis | Kingdom of Greece | M | athletics 1, basketball 1 | 1952 | 1952 | 1 |
| Sharon van Rouwendaal | Netherlands | F | marathon swimming 3, swimming 3 | 2012 | 2024 | 4 |
| Dori Ruano | Spain | F | road cycling 3, track cycling 1 | 1992 | 2004 | 3 |
| Joe Ruddy | United States | M | swimming 1, water polo 1 | 1904 | 1904 | 1 |
| Ray Ruddy | United States | M | swimming 1, water polo 1 | 1928 | 1936 | 2 |
| Lizeth Rueda | Mexico | F | marathon swimming 1, triathlon 1 | 2012 | 2024 | 2 |
| Muhammad Shah Rukh | Pakistan | M | field hockey 1, road cycling 1, track cycling 1 | 1948 | 1956 | 2 |
| Axel Runström | Sweden | M | diving 2, water polo 1 | 1908 | 1912 | 2 |
| Milcho Rusev | Bulgaria | M | road cycling 1, track cycling 1 | 1952 | 1952 | 1 |
| Emil Rusu | Socialist Republic of Romania | M | road cycling 2, track cycling 1 | 1964 | 1968 | 2 |
| Cosme Saavedra | Argentina | M | road cycling 2, track cycling 1 | 1924 | 1928 | 2 |
| Peter Sagan | Slovakia | M | mountain bike cycling 1, road cycling 1 | 2012 | 2016 | 2 |
| Mika Saiki | Japan | F | beach volleyball 2, volleyball 1 | 1996 | 2008 | 3 |
| Fernand Saivé | Belgium | M | road cycling 1, track cycling 1 | 1924 | 1924 | 1 |
| Ahmed Salem Hassan | Egypt | M | road cycling 1, track cycling 1 | 1924 | 1924 | 1 |
| Abrahão Saliture | Brazil | M | rowing 1, water polo 1 | 1920 | 1920 | 1 |
| Ali Salman | Iraq | M | athletics 1, basketball 1 | 1948 | 1948 | 1 |
| Veikko Salminen | Finland | M | fencing 1, modern pentathlon 1 | 1972 | 1976 | 2 |
| Aarne Salovaara | Finland | M | athletics 1, gymnastics 2 | 1908 | 1912 | 2 |
| Svetlana Samokhvalova | Unified Team (1992), Russia | F | road cycling 2, track cycling 2 | 1992 | 1996 | 2 |
| Nataliya Samorodina | Ukraine | F | marathon swimming 1, swimming 1 | 2004 | 2008 | 2 |
| Paul Samson | United States | M | swimming 1, water polo 1 | 1928 | 1928 | 1 |
| Sergio Sánchez | Guatemala | M | modern pentathlon 1, shooting 3 | 1992 | 2012 | 4 |
| Torsten Sandelin | Finland | M | gymnastics 1, sailing 1 | 1908 | 1912 | 2 |
| Charles Sands | / United States | M | golf 1, jeu de paume 1, tennis 1 | 1900 | 1908 | 2 |
| Michael Sandstød | Denmark | M | road cycling 1, track cycling 1 | 1992 | 2000 | 2 |
| Clive Saney | Trinidad and Tobago | M | road cycling 1, track cycling 1 | 1972 | 1972 | 1 |
| Remo Sansonetti | Australia | M | road cycling 2, track cycling 1 | 1972 | 1980 | 3 |
| Martin Santos | Guam | M | road cycling 1, track cycling 1 | 1992 | 1992 | 1 |
| Émile Sarrade | France | M | rugby 1, tug of war 1 | 1900 | 1900 | 1 |
| Teofil Savniky | Kingdom of Hungary | M | art competitions 1, athletics 1 | 1912 | 1936 | 2 |
| Neville Sayers | Australia | M | modern pentathlon 2, shooting 1 | 1956 | 1960 | 2 |
| Warren Scarfe | Australia | M | road cycling 1, track cycling 2 | 1956 | 1960 | 2 |
| Otto Scheff | Austrian Empire | M | swimming 1, water polo 1 | 1908 | 1912 | 2 |
| Kurt Schein | Austria | M | road cycling 1, track cycling 2 | 1956 | 1960 | 2 |
| István Schillerwein | Hungary | M | road cycling 1, track cycling 1 | 1952 | 1952 | 1 |
| Adolf Schmal | Austrian Empire | M | fencing 1, track cycling 1 | 1896 | 1896 | 1 |
| Eugen Schmidt | Denmark | M | athletics 1, shooting 1, tug of war 1 | 1896 | 1900 | 2 |
| Hans Schöchlin | Switzerland | M | art competitions 1, rowing 1 | 1928 | 1936 | 2 |
| Otto Schoenfeld | United States | M | athletics 1, fencing 1 | 1900 | 1900 | 1 |
| John Schommer | United States | M | athletics 1, basketball 1 | 1904 | 1904 | 1 |
| Hermann Schreiber | Switzerland | M | aeronautics 1, gliding 1 | 1936 | 1936 | 1 |
| Kay Schrøder | Denmark | M | art competitions 1, fencing 1 | 1920 | 1924 | 2 |
| Carl Schuhmann | German Empire | M | athletics 1, gymnastics 1, weightlifting 1, wrestling 1 | 1896 | 1896 | 1 |
| Richard Schuil | Netherlands | M | beach volleyball 2, volleyball 3 | 1996 | 2012 | 5 |
| Benjamin Schulte | Guam | M | marathon swimming 1, swimming 1 | 2012 | 2016 | 2 |
| Brad Schumacher | United States | M | swimming 1, water polo 1 | 1996 | 2000 | 2 |
| Heiko Schwartz | Weimar Republic (1932), Nazi Germany (1936) | M | swimming 1, water polo 1 | 1932 | 1936 | 2 |
| Donald Scott | United States | M | athletics 1, modern pentathlon 1 | 1920 | 1924 | 2 |
| Robert Sears | United States | M | fencing 1, modern pentathlon 1 | 1920 | 1920 | 1 |
| Edgar Seligman | United Kingdom | M | art competitions 2, fencing 4 | 1908 | 1932 | 6 |
| Anthony Sellier | Trinidad and Tobago | M | road cycling 1, track cycling 2 | 1972 | 1976 | 2 |
| Frederick Semple | United States | M | golf 1, tennis 1 | 1904 | 1904 | 1 |
| Pieter van Senus | Netherlands | M | swimming 1, water polo 1 | 1924 | 1928 | 2 |
| Luis Fernando Sepúlveda | Chile | M | road cycling 1, track cycling 1 | 1996 | 2000 | 2 |
| Carlos Serantes | Argentina | M | rowing 1, sailing 1 | 1924 | 1928 | 2 |
| José Rodolfo Serpa | Colombia | M | road cycling 1, track cycling 1 | 2004 | 2008 | 2 |
| Abdel Aziz El-Shafei | Egypt | M | swimming 1, water polo 2 | 1952 | 1960 | 2 |
| Khamlillal Shah | India | M | swimming 2, water polo 1 | 1948 | 1952 | 2 |
| Tim Shaw | United States | M | swimming 1, water polo 1 | 1976 | 1984 | 2 |
| Khalid Shebani | Libya | M | road cycling 1, track cycling 1 | 1980 | 1980 | 1 |
| Donald Sheldon | United States | M | road cycling 1, track cycling 1 | 1952 | 1952 | 1 |
| Shigeo Takahashi | Japan | M | swimming 1, water polo 1 | 1932 | 1936 | 2 |
| Laurie Shong | Canada | M | fencing 2, modern pentathlon 1 | 1992 | 2000 | 2 |
| Haydar Shonjani | Iran | M | swimming 1, water polo 1 | 1964 | 1976 | 2 |
| Shue Ming-Shu | Chinese Taipei | M | road cycling 2, track cycling 1 | 1964 | 1968 | 2 |
| Shue Ming-Fa | Chinese Taipei | M | road cycling 1, track cycling 1 | 1972 | 1972 | 1 |
| Carl Silfverstrand | Sweden | M | athletics 1, gymnastics 1 | 1908 | 1912 | 2 |
| Jean van Silfhout | Netherlands | M | rowing 1, swimming 1, water polo 2 | 1920 | 1928 | 3 |
| Jackie Silva | Brazil | F | beach volleyball 1, volleyball 2 | 1980 | 1996 | 3 |
| Amar Singh Billing | India | M | road cycling 1, track cycling 1 | 1964 | 1964 | 1 |
| Dalbir Singh Gill | India | M | road cycling 1, track cycling 1 | 1964 | 1964 | 1 |
| Chetan Singh Hari | India | M | road cycling 1, track cycling 1 | 1964 | 1964 | 1 |
| Amar Singh Sokhi | India | M | road cycling 1, track cycling 1 | 1964 | 1964 | 1 |
| John Sinibaldi | United States | M | road cycling 2, track cycling 1 | 1932 | 1936 | 2 |
| Alesana Sione | American Samoa | M | weightlifting 1, wrestling 1 | 1988 | 2000 | 2 |
| Curt Sjöberg | Sweden | M | diving 2, gymnastics 1 | 1920 | 1928 | 3 |
| Henrik Sjöberg | Sweden | M | athletics 1, gymnastics 1 | 1896 | 1896 | 1 |
| Ron Skarin | United States | M | road cycling 1, track cycling 1 | 1972 | 1976 | 2 |
| Jerzy Skolimowski | Poland | M | art competitions 1, rowing 3 | 1928 | 1936 | 3 |
| Olga Slyusareva | Russia | F | road cycling 2, track cycling 3 | 2000 | 2008 | 3 |
| René Smet | Belgium | M | boxing 1, rowing 1 | 1920 | 1920 | 1 |
| Michele Smith | Cayman Islands | M | road cycling 2, track cycling 1 | 1988 | 1992 | 2 |
| Gustaf Söderström | Sweden | M | athletics 1, tug of war 1 | 1900 | 1900 | 1 |
| Mehdi Sohrabi | Iran | M | road cycling 2, track cycling 1 | 2004 | 2012 | 3 |
| Kaarlo Soinio | Finland | M | football 1, gymnastics 1 | 1908 | 1912 | 2 |
| Elemér Somfay | Kingdom of Hungary | M | athletics 1, modern pentathlon 1 | 1924 | 1932 | 2 |
| Chainarong Sophonpong | Thailand | M | road cycling 2, track cycling 1 | 1964 | 1968 | 2 |
| Marco Soria | Bolivia | M | road cycling 1, track cycling 1 | 1976 | 1976 | 1 |
| Frank Southall | United Kingdom | M | road cycling 2, track cycling 1 | 1928 | 1932 | 2 |
| Karl Staaf | Sweden | M | athletics 1, tug of war 1 | 1900 | 1900 | 1 |
| George Stadel | United States | M | athletics 1, tennis 1 | 1904 | 1904 | 1 |
| Frederick Stapleton | United Kingdom | M | swimming 1, water polo 1 | 1900 | 1900 | 1 |
| Vernon Stauble | Trinidad and Tobago | M | road cycling 1, track cycling 2 | 1968 | 1972 | 2 |
| Tom Steels | Belgium | M | road cycling 1, track cycling 1 | 1992 | 1996 | 2 |
| Arie van der Stel | Netherlands | M | road cycling 1, track cycling 1 | 1920 | 1920 | 1 |
| Eduard Stibor | Czechoslovakia | M | swimming 1, water polo 1 | 1920 | 1920 | 1 |
| Olof Stolpe | Finland | M | bandy 1, football 1 | 1952 | 1952 | 1 |
| Petar Stoychev | Bulgaria | M | marathon swimming 2, swimming 3 | 2000 | 2012 | 4 |
| Sidney Stranne | Sweden | M | fencing 1, modern pentathlon 1 | 1912 | 1928 | 2 |
| Oscar Strático | Argentina | M | judo 1, wrestling 1 | 1976 | 1984 | 2 |
| Corbin Strong | New Zealand | M | road cycling 1, track cycling 1 | 2020 | 2024 | 2 |
| Trevor Strydom | South Africa | M | fencing 1, modern pentathlon 1 | 1992 | 1992 | 1 |
| George Stulac | Canada | M | athletics 1, basketball 2 | 1956 | 1964 | 3 |
| Rob Stull | United States | M | fencing 1, modern pentathlon 2 | 1988 | 1992 | 2 |
| Raimo Suikkanen | Finland | M | road cycling 1, track cycling 2 | 1968 | 1972 | 2 |
| Krzysztof Sujka | Poland | M | road cycling 1, track cycling 1 | 1976 | 1980 | 2 |
| Klaus Suomela | Finland (1912), Finland | M | art competitions 1, gymnastics 1 | 1912 | 1924 | 2 |
| Miroslav Šustera | Bohemia | M | athletics 2, wrestling 1 | 1908 | 1912 | 2 |
| Chloe Sutton | United States | F | marathon swimming 1, swimming 1 | 2008 | 2012 | 2 |
| Reginald Sutton | United Kingdom | M | swimming 2, water polo 1 | 1928 | 1936 | 3 |
| Joël Suty | France | M | diving 1, gymnastics 2 | 1976 | 1984 | 3 |
| Edwin Swatek | United States | M | swimming 1, water polo 1 | 1904 | 1904 | 1 |
| Jimmy Swift | South Africa | M | road cycling 2, track cycling 2 | 1952 | 1956 | 2 |
| Alison Sydor | Canada | F | mountain bike cycling 3, road cycling 1 | 1992 | 2004 | 4 |
| Maria Sykora | Austria | F | athletics 1, handball 1 | 1972 | 1984 | 2 |
| Stefan Szelestowski | Poland | M | athletics 1, modern pentathlon 1 | 1924 | 1928 | 2 |
| István Szívós | Hungary | M | swimming 1, water polo 3 | 1948 | 1956 | 3 |
| István Szondy | Hungary | M | equestrian 1, modern pentathlon 2 | 1948 | 1956 | 3 |
| Tadashi Kato | Japan | M | road cycling 1, track cycling 1 | 1952 | 1952 | 1 |
| Ginevra Taddeucci | Italy | F | marathon swimming 1, swimming 1 | 2024 | 2024 | 1 |
| Yukiko Takahashi | Japan | F | beach volleyball 2, volleyball 2 | 1988 | 2000 | 4 |
| Takaji Takebayashi | Japan | M | swimming 1, water polo 1 | 1928 | 1932 | 2 |
| Lee Talbott | United States | M | athletics 1, tug of war 1, wrestling 1 | 1908 | 1908 | 1 |
| Harald Tammer | Estonia | M | athletics 2, weightlifting 1 | 1920 | 1924 | 2 |
| Tamotsu Chikanari | Japan | M | road cycling 1, track cycling 1 | 1952 | 1952 | 1 |
| Tang Kam Man | Hong Kong | M | road cycling 1, track cycling 1 | 1976 | 1976 | 1 |
| Lauri Tanner | Finland | M | football 1, gymnastics 1 | 1912 | 1912 | 1 |
| Sheila Taormina | United States | F | modern pentathlon 1, swimming 1, triathlon 2 | 1996 | 2008 | 4 |
| Momčilo Tapavica | Kingdom of Hungary | M | tennis 1, weightlifting 1, wrestling 1 | 1896 | 1896 | 1 |
| René Tartara | France | M | swimming 1, water polo 1 | 1900 | 1900 | 1 |
| Herbert Taylor | United States | M | swimming 1, water polo 1 | 1920 | 1920 | 1 |
| Dink Templeton | United States | M | athletics 1, rugby 1 | 1920 | 1920 | 1 |
| Einari Teräsvirta | Finland | M | art competitions 1, gymnastics 3 | 1932 | 1952 | 4 |
| Laurent Tessier | Canada | M | road cycling 1, track cycling 1 | 1948 | 1948 | 1 |
| Sven Thofelt | Sweden | M | fencing 3, modern pentathlon 3 | 1928 | 1948 | 4 |
| Geraint Thomas | United Kingdom | M | road cycling 2, track cycling 2 | 2008 | 2020 | 4 |
| Jim Thorpe | United States | M | athletics 1, baseball 1 | 1912 | 1912 | 1 |
| Karin Thürig | Switzerland | F | road cycling 2, track cycling 2 | 2004 | 2008 | 2 |
| Juan José Timón | Uruguay | M | road cycling 1, track cycling 2 | 1960 | 1964 | 2 |
| Léon Tisserand | France | M | swimming 1, water polo 1 | 1900 | 1900 | 1 |
| Tjow Choon Boon | Malaysia | M | road cycling 1, track cycling 1 | 1964 | 1964 | 1 |
| Giuseppe Tonani | Kingdom of Italy | M | tug of war 1, weightlifting 2 | 1920 | 1928 | 3 |
| Christiaan Tonnet | Netherlands | M | equestrian eventing 1, modern pentathlon 2 | 1924 | 1936 | 3 |
| Hjördis Töpel | Sweden | F | diving 2, swimming 1 | 1924 | 1928 | 2 |
| Trần Văn Nen | South Vietnam | M | road cycling 1, track cycling 1 | 1964 | 1964 | 1 |
| Friedrich Traun | German Empire | M | athletics 1, tennis 1 | 1896 | 1896 | 1 |
| Radamés Treviño | Mexico | M | road cycling 1, track cycling 1 | 1968 | 1968 | 1 |
| Rudolf Trost | Austria | M | fencing 3, modern pentathlon 1 | 1964 | 1972 | 3 |
| Yoshihiro Tsumuraya | Japan | M | road cycling 1, track cycling 2 | 1984 | 1988 | 2 |
| Kuzey Tunçelli | Turkey | M | marathon swimming 1, swimming 1 | 2024 | 2024 | 1 |
| Jack Turnbull | United States | M | field hockey 1, lacrosse 1 | 1932 | 1936 | 2 |
| George Turner | Canada | M | road cycling 1, track cycling 1 | 1936 | 1936 | 1 |
| Bill Tuttle | United States | M | swimming 1, water polo 1 | 1904 | 1904 | 1 |
| Rebecca Twigg | United States | F | road cycling 1, track cycling 2 | 1984 | 1996 | 3 |
| Arnolds Ūdris | Latvia | M | road cycling 1, track cycling 1 | 1992 | 1992 | 1 |
| Bertil Uggla | Sweden | M | athletics 1, fencing 3 | 1912 | 1928 | 4 |
| Ese Ukpeseraye | Nigeria | F | road cycling 1, track cycling 1 | 2024 | 2024 | 1 |
| Francisco Uranga | Argentina | M | swimming 1, water polo 1 | 1928 | 1928 | 1 |
| María Isabel Urrutia | Colombia | F | athletics 1, weightlifting 1 | 1988 | 2000 | 2 |
| Eugene Utz | United States | M | athletics 1, gymnastics 1 | 1904 | 1904 | 1 |
| Roland Van De Rijse | Belgium | M | road cycling 1, track cycling 1 | 1964 | 1964 | 1 |
| Maurice van den Bemden | Belgium | M | field hockey 1, tennis 1 | 1920 | 1920 | 1 |
| Jean Van Den Bosch | Belgium | M | road cycling 1, track cycling 1 | 1924 | 1924 | 1 |
| Karel John van den Brandeler | Netherlands | M | fencing 1, modern pentathlon 1 | 1924 | 1928 | 2 |
| George Van Cleaf | United States | M | swimming 1, water polo 1 | 1904 | 1904 | 1 |
| Mathieu van der Poel | Netherlands | M | mountain bike cycling 1, road cycling 1 | 2020 | 2024 | 2 |
| Albert Van Vlierberghe | Belgium | M | road cycling 1, track cycling 1 | 1964 | 1964 | 1 |
| Yevgeny Vakker | Kyrgyzstan | M | road cycling 2, track cycling 1 | 1996 | 2004 | 3 |
| Ulises Váldez | Cuba | M | road cycling 1, track cycling 1 | 1968 | 1968 | 1 |
| Christian Vande Velde | United States | M | road cycling 1, track cycling 1 | 2000 | 2008 | 2 |
| Albert Vandeplancke | France | M | swimming 1, water polo 1 | 1928 | 1928 | 1 |
| Blanka Vas | Hungary | F | mountain bike cycling 2, road cycling 1 | 2020 | 2024 | 2 |
| Alla Vasilenko | Kazakhstan | F | road cycling 1, track cycling 1 | 1996 | 1996 | 1 |
| Dionysios Vasilopoulos | Kingdom of Greece | M | swimming 1, water polo 2 | 1920 | 1924 | 2 |
| Paul Vasseur | France | M | swimming 1, water polo 3 | 1900 | 1920 | 3 |
| Raúl Marcelo Vázquez | Cuba | M | road cycling 3, track cycling 3 | 1968 | 1976 | 3 |
| Alberto Velázquez | Uruguay | M | road cycling 2, track cycling 2 | 1956 | 1960 | 2 |
| Ilya Velchev | Bulgaria | M | road cycling 1, track cycling 1 | 1952 | 1952 | 1 |
| Jules Verbecke | France | M | swimming 1, water polo 1 | 1900 | 1900 | 1 |
| Émile Vercken | Belgium | M | athletics 1, field hockey 1 | 1928 | 1928 | 1 |
| Maurice Verdonck | Belgium | M | art competitions 1, rowing 1 | 1900 | 1928 | 2 |
| Jean-Pierre Vermetten | Belgium | M | swimming 1, water polo 1 | 1920 | 1924 | 2 |
| Michel Vermeulin | France | M | road cycling 1, track cycling 1 | 1956 | 1956 | 1 |
| Sotirios Versis | Kingdom of Greece | M | athletics 2, weightlifting 1 | 1896 | 1900 | 2 |
| Gianni Vignaduzzi | Canada | M | road cycling 1, track cycling 1 | 1988 | 1992 | 2 |
| Tea Vikstedt-Nyman | Finland | F | road cycling 3, track cycling 2 | 1988 | 1996 | 3 |
| Raimondas Vilčinskas | Lithuania | M | road cycling 1, track cycling 1 | 1996 | 2004 | 2 |
| Erika Villaécija | Spain | F | marathon swimming 2, swimming 3 | 2004 | 2016 | 4 |
| Elia Viviani | Italy | M | road cycling 2, track cycling 4 | 2012 | 2024 | 4 |
| Rezső von Bartha | Kingdom of Hungary | M | fencing 1, modern pentathlon 1 | 1936 | 1936 | 1 |
| Adrie Voorting | Netherlands | M | road cycling 1, track cycling 1 | 1952 | 1952 | 1 |
| Gerrit Voorting | Netherlands | M | road cycling 1, track cycling 1 | 1948 | 1948 | 1 |
| Marianne Vos | Netherlands | F | road cycling 5, track cycling 1 | 2008 | 2024 | 5 |
| Ole Wackström | Finland | M | road cycling 2, track cycling 1 | 1968 | 1972 | 2 |
| Sixten Wackström | Finland | M | road cycling 2, track cycling 2 | 1980 | 1984 | 2 |
| Helen Wainwright | United States | F | diving 1, swimming 1 | 1920 | 1924 | 2 |
| James Walker | South Africa | M | road cycling 1, track cycling 1 | 1920 | 1920 | 1 |
| Brian Walton | Canada | M | road cycling 2, track cycling 2 | 1988 | 2000 | 3 |
| Kerri Walsh Jennings | United States | F | beach volleyball 4, volleyball 1 | 2000 | 2016 | 5 |
| Thomas Wand-Tetley | United Kingdom | M | fencing 2, modern pentathlon 1 | 1920 | 1928 | 2 |
| Fred Warmbold | United States | M | athletics 1, wrestling 1 | 1904 | 1904 | 1 |
| Kathy Watt | Australia | F | road cycling 2, track cycling 2 | 1992 | 1996 | 2 |
| Kelly-Ann Way | Canada | F | road cycling 2, track cycling 1 | 1988 | 1992 | 2 |
| Frederick Weber | United States | M | fencing 1, modern pentathlon 1 | 1936 | 1936 | 1 |
| Norman Webster | Canada | M | road cycling 1, track cycling 1 | 1920 | 1920 | 1 |
| Magnus Wegelius | Finland (1908), Finland | M | gymnastics 1, shooting 2 | 1908 | 1924 | 3 |
| Rémy Weil | France | M | diving 2, swimming 1 | 1920 | 1924 | 2 |
| Johnny Weissmuller | United States | M | swimming 2, water polo 2 | 1924 | 1928 | 2 |
| Florian Wellbrock | Germany | M | marathon swimming 2, swimming 3 | 2016 | 2024 | 3 |
| Weng Yu-Yi | Chinese Taipei | M | road cycling 1, track cycling 1 | 1992 | 1992 | 1 |
| János Wenk | Kingdom of Hungary | M | swimming 1, water polo 2 | 1912 | 1924 | 2 |
| Gunnar Wennerström | Sweden | M | swimming 1, water polo 1 | 1908 | 1908 | 1 |
| Kristel Werckx | Belgium | F | road cycling 2, track cycling 1 | 1988 | 1992 | 2 |
| Lawrence Whitney | United States | M | athletics 1, baseball 1 | 1912 | 1912 | 1 |
| Robert Whetters | Australia | M | road cycling 1, track cycling 1 | 1960 | 1960 | 1 |
| Tara Whitten | Canada | F | road cycling 1, track cycling 1 | 2012 | 2016 | 2 |
| Daniel Wiffen | Ireland | M | marathon swimming 1, swimming 2 | 2020 | 2024 | 2 |
| Bradley Wiggins | United Kingdom | M | road cycling 1, track cycling 4 | 2000 | 2016 | 5 |
| Jordan Wilimovsky | United States | M | marathon swimming 2, swimming 1 | 2016 | 2020 | 2 |
| Oskar Wilkman | Finland (1912), Finland | M | equestrian 1, modern pentathlon 1 | 1912 | 1920 | 2 |
| Mark Williams | Australia | M | beach volleyball 1, volleyball 1 | 2000 | 2004 | 2 |
| Helen Wills | United States | F | art competitions 1, tennis 1 | 1924 | 1932 | 2 |
| Franz Wimmer | Austria | M | road cycling 2, track cycling 2 | 1952 | 1956 | 2 |
| Walter W. Winans | / United States | M | art competitions 1, shooting 2 | 1908 | 1912 | 2 |
| Charles Winckler | Denmark | M | athletics 1, tug of war 1 | 1900 | 1900 | 1 |
| Wally Wolf | /United States | M | swimming 2, water polo 2 | 1948 | 1960 | 4 |
| Jamie Wong | Hong Kong | F | road cycling 1, track cycling 1 | 2008 | 2012 | 2 |
| Wong Kam-po | Hong Kong (1996), Hong Kong | M | road cycling 3, track cycling 3 | 1996 | 2012 | 5 |
| Gustave Wuyts | Belgium | M | athletics 1, tug of war 1 | 1920 | 1920 | 1 |
| Robert Wyss | Switzerland | M | swimming 2, water polo 3 | 1924 | 1936 | 3 |
| Xin Tong | China | M | marathon swimming 1, swimming 1 | 2004 | 2008 | 2 |
| Xin Xin | China | F | marathon swimming 3, swimming 1 | 2012 | 2024 | 4 |
| Yang Shuyu | China | F | basketball 1, basketball 3x3 1 | 2020 | 2024 | 2 |
| Yang Hsiu-Chen | Chinese Taipei | F | road cycling 1, track cycling 1 | 1988 | 1988 | 1 |
| Vyacheslav Yekimov | Soviet Union (1988), Russia | M | road cycling 2, track cycling 1 | 1988 | 2004 | 3 |
| José Maria Yermo | Restoration (Spain) | M | football 1, track cycling 1 | 1928 | 1928 | 1 |
| Yoshitaku Nagasako | Japan | M | BMX cycling 2, track cycling 1 | 2016 | 2024 | 3 |
| Jackie Young | United States | F | basketball 1, basketball 3x3 1 | 2020 | 2024 | 2 |
| Elaine Youngs | United States | F | beach volleyball 2, volleyball 1 | 1996 | 2008 | 3 |
| Imre Zachár | Kingdom of Hungary | M | swimming 2, water polo 1 | 1908 | 1912 | 2 |
| Aiga Zagorska | Lithuania | F | road cycling 1, track cycling 1 | 1992 | 1992 | 1 |
| Christos Zalokostas | Kingdom of Greece | M | fencing 1, shooting 1 | 1936 | 1936 | 1 |
| Kurt Zellhofer | Austria | M | road cycling 2, track cycling 1 | 1980 | 1984 | 2 |
| Rajmund Zieliński | Poland | M | road cycling 1, track cycling 1 | 1964 | 1968 | 2 |
| Leontien Zijlaard-van Moorsel | Netherlands | F | road cycling 3, track cycling 3 | 1992 | 2004 | 3 |
| Robert Zimmerman | Canada | M | diving 2, swimming 1 | 1908 | 1912 | 2 |
| Roger Zirilli | Switzerland | M | swimming 1, water polo 1 | 1936 | 1936 | 1 |
| Peter Zobl-Wessely | Austria | M | fencing 1, modern pentathlon 1 | 1972 | 1976 | 2 |
| Joop Zoetemelk | Netherlands | M | road cycling 1, track cycling 1 | 1968 | 1968 | 1 |

=== By nation ===
In the next list there are the athletes of the table divided by nation. The total of this table is 1072 because 20 athletes have competed for more than one nation.

| Country | Number of athletes | M | F |
|---|---|---|---|
| American Samoa | 1 | 1 | 0 |
| Antigua and Barbuda | 2 | 2 | 0 |
| Argentina | 16 | 15 | 1 |
| Australasia | 2 | 2 | 0 |
| Australia/Australia | 38 | 26 | 12 |
| Austria | 22 (Note: Margarete Adler competed 1 time for the Austrian Empire) | 19 | 3 |
| Austrian Empire | 5 (Note: Margarete Adler competed 1 time for Austria) | 4 | 1 |
| Azerbaijan | 1 (Note: Yelena Chalykh competed 1 time for Russia) | 0 | 1 |
| Bahrain | 3 | 3 | 0 |
| Barbados | 4 | 4 | 0 |
| Belarus | 1 | 1 | 0 |
| Belgium | 40 | 38 | 2 |
| Belize | 1 | 1 | 0 |
| Bohemia (1908) / Bohemia (1912) | 2 (Note: Bohumil Honzátko competed 1 time for Czechoslovakia) | 2 | 0 |
| Bolivia | 2 | 2 | 0 |
| Brazil | 19 | 16 | 3 |
| British West Indies | 1 | 1 | 0 |
| Bulgaria, Bulgaria | 5 | 5 | 0 |
| Cambodia | 1 | 1 | 0 |
| Canada, Canada, Canada | 31 | 24 | 7 |
| Cayman Islands | 2 | 2 | 0 |
| Chile | 10 | 9 | 1 |
| China | 4 | 2 | 2 |
| Chinese Taipei | 8 | 6 | 2 |
| Colombia | 7 | 6 | 1 |
| Cuba | 7 | 5 | 2 |
| Czech Republic | 4 (Note: Daniela Bártová competed 1 time for Czechoslovakia) | 1 | 3 |
| Czechoslovakia | 16 (Note: Bohumil Honzátko competed 1 time for Bohemia and 1 time for Bohemia. Daniela Bártová competed 1 time for Czech Republic) | 15 | 1 |
| Denmark | 23 (Note: Sigurjón Pétursson was Icelandic but Icelandic competitors in 1908 Summer Olympic Games competed for Denmark) | 23 | 0 |
| East Germany | 5 (Note: Olaf Ludwig, Bernd Dittert, Susanne Lahme and Petra Roßner competed at least 1 time for Germany) | 2 | 3 |
| Ecuador | 2 | 1 | 1 |
| Egypt | 8 | 8 | 0 |
| El Salvador | 2 | 0 | 2 |
| Estonia | 1 | 1 | 0 |
| Finland/Finland | 32 | 30 | 2 |
| France | 72 | 65 | 7 |
| German Empire | 9 | 9 | 0 |
| Germany | 18 (Note: Ralf Berckhan competed 1 time for the Germany. Beate Bühler and Michael Rich competed at least 1 time for West Germany. Olaf Ludwig, Bernd Dittert, Susanne Lahme and Petra Roßner competed at least 1 time for East Germany) | 8 | 10 |
| Greece (1976)/Greece | 3 | 2 | 1 |
| Guam | 5 | 4 | 1 |
| Guatemala | 1 | 1 | 0 |
| Guyana (1948)/Guyana | 2 | 2 | 0 |
| Hong Kong/Hong Kong | 8 | 4 | 4 |
| Hungary/Hungary | 14 | 11 | 3 |
| Iceland | 2 | 2 | 0 |
| India (1932)/India | 12 | 12 | 0 |
| IOP | 1 | 1 | 0 |
| Iran | 9 | 9 | 0 |
| Iraq | 1 | 1 | 0 |
| Ireland | 2 | 2 | 0 |
| Italy | 15 (Note: Katarzyna Juszczak competed 1 time for Poland) | 10 | 5 |
| Jamaica | 5 | 5 | 0 |
| Japan | 17 | 13 | 4 |
| Kazakhstan | 1 | 0 | 1 |
| Kingdom of Greece | 20 | 20 | 0 |
| Kingdom of Hungary | 17 | 17 | 0 |
| Kingdom of Italy | 4 | 4 | 0 |
| Korea | 3 | 2 | 1 |
| Kyrgyzstan | 1 | 1 | 0 |
| Latvia | 3 (Note: Andrejs Apsītis competed 1 time for the Russian Empire) | 3 | 0 |
| Lebanon | 1 | 1 | 0 |
| Libya | 1 | 1 | 0 |
| Liechtenstein | 2 | 2 | 0 |
| Lithuania | 6 (Note: Artūras Kasputis competed 1 times for Soviet Union) | 5 | 1 |
| Luxembourg | 3 | 2 | 1 |
| Malaysia | 6 | 6 | 0 |
| Mauritius | 1 | 0 | 1 |
| Mexico | 17 | 15 | 2 |
| Monaco | 2 | 2 | 0 |
| Morocco | 1 | 1 | 0 |
| Nazi Germany | 2 (Note: Heinrich Hax and Heiko Schwartz competed 1 time for the Weimar Republic) | 2 | 0 |
| Netherlands | 41 | 31 | 10 |
| Netherlands Antilles | 1 | 1 | 0 |
| New Zealand | 15 | 11 | 4 |
| Nigeria | 1 | 0 | 1 |
| Norway | 9 | 7 | 2 |
| Pakistan | 6 | 6 | 0 |
| Perù | 2 | 2 | 0 |
| Philippines | 2 | 2 | 0 |
| Poland/Poland | 12 (Note: Katarzyna Juszczak competed 1 time for Italy) | 10 | 2 |
| Portugal | 6 | 6 | 0 |
| Republic of Moldova | 2 | 1 | 1 |
| Restoration (Spain) | 4 | 4 | 0 |
| ROC | 1 | 0 | 1 |
| Russia | 5 (Note: Yelena Chalykh competed 1 time for Azerbaijan. Vyacheslav Yekimov competed 2 times for Soviet Union. Svetlana Samokhvalova competed 1 time for the Unified Team) | 2 | 3 |
| Russian Empire | 3 (Note: Andrejs Apsītis competed 1 time for Latvia) | 3 | 0 |
| Rwanda | 1 | 1 | 0 |
| Slovakia | 4 | 2 | 2 |
| Socialist Republic of Romania | 1 | 1 | 0 |
| South Africa/ South Africa/ South Africa/South Africa | 15 | 14 | 1 |
| South Vietnam | 1 | 1 | 0 |
| Soviet Union | 2 (Note: Artūras Kasputis competed 2 times for Lithuania. Vyacheslav Yekimov competed 2 times for Russia) | 2 | 0 |
| Spain/Spain | 7 | 3 | 4 |
| Suriname | 1 | 1 | 0 |
| Sweden | 48 | 46 | 2 |
| Switzerland | 21 | 18 | 3 |
| Thailand | 2 | 2 | 0 |
| Trinidad and Tobago/Trinidad and Tobago | 5 | 5 | 0 |
| Tunisia | 2 | 2 | 0 |
| Turkey | 2 | 2 | 0 |
| Ukraine | 5 | 3 | 2 |
| Germany | 1 (Note: Ralf Berckhan competed 1 time for Germany) | 1 | 0 |
| Unified Team | 1 (Note: Svetlana Samokhvalova competed 1 time for Russia) | 0 | 1 |
| United Kingdom | 52 (Note: Debbie Hill competed 1 time for Zimbabwe) | 44 | 8 |
| ///United States | 141 | 121 | 20 |
| Uruguay | 12 | 12 | 0 |
| Venezuela/Venezuela | 8 | 5 | 3 |
| Vietnam | 1 | 1 | 0 |
| Weimar Republic | 3 (Note: Heinrich Hax and Heiko Schwartz competed 1 time for Nazi Germany) | 3 | 0 |
| West Germany | 3 (Note: Beate Bühler and Michael Rich competed at least 1 time for Germany) | 2 | 1 |
| Yugoslavia/Yugoslavia | 4 | 4 | 0 |
| Zambia | 2 | 0 | 2 |
| Zimbabwe | 2 (Note: Debbie Hill competed 1 time for the United Kingdom) | 1 | 1 |
| Total | 1072 | 906 | 166 |

== Uncertain athletes ==
The next 197 athletes have an uncertain status: they have not participated at one (or more) of two or more sports but their appearance in the Olympic official website is considered official. Some of them have been already included in the list above. There are also some contrasts between Olympedia and the Olympics official website regarding the number of appearances.

Sports in italics are those sports that are considered as official in the Olympics website or Olympedia but the athletes have not participated at them (or one out of more times: in these cases the number written is the number of the Olympic appearances in that sport including the uncertain and in the notes is written only the total of the official appearances).

The total Olympic appearances contains the uncertain Olympic appearances too but not the 1906 Intercalated Games.

The most common combinations of uncertain sports are swimming/water polo (73), athletics/gymnastics (21) and fencing/modern pentathlon (13).

Athletes already included in the list above (51)

| Athlete | Country | Sex | Sports | First | Last | Total Olympic appearances |
|---|---|---|---|---|---|---|
| Juan Abellán | Spain | M | swimming 1, water polo 1 | 1952 | 1952 | 1 |
| Fausto Acke | Sweden | M | athletics 1, gymnastics 1 | 1920 | 1920 | 1 |
| Sándor Ádám | Kingdom of Hungary | M | swimming 1, water polo 1 | 1908 | 1912 | 2 |
| Arno Almqvist | Finland | M | swimming 1, water polo 1 | 1912 | 1912 | 1 |
| Alfredo Álvarez Calderón | Perù | M | diving 1, swimming 1 | 1936 | 1936 | 1 |
| Miklós Ambrus | Hungary | M | swimming 1, water polo 1 | 1960 | 1964 | 2 |
| Albert Amrhein | German Empire | M | athletics 1, rugby 1 | 1900 | 1900 | 1 |
| Bill Andre | United States | M | fencing 1, modern pentathlon 1 | 1956 | 1956 | 1 |
| Harald Arbin | Sweden | M | athletics 1, diving 2 | 1896 | 1912 | 3 |
| Kulwant Arora | India | M | athletics 1, field hockey 1 | 1960 | 1960 | 1 |
| Andreas Asimakopoulos | Kingdom of Greece | M | swimming 2, water polo 2 | 1912 | 1924 | 3 |
| Péter Bácsalmási | Kingdom of Hungary | M | athletics 3, basketball 1 | 1928 | 1936 | 3 |
| Viktor Baranov | Russian Empire | M | diving 1, swimming 1 | 1912 | 1912 | 1 |
| Edward Barrett | United Kingdom | M | athletics 2, tug of war 1, wrestling 2 | 1908 | 1912 | 2 |
| Erman Bastian | India | M | athletics 1, field hockey 1 | 1960 | 1960 | 1 |
| Josep Bazán | Spain | M | swimming 1, water polo 1 | 1952 | 1952 | 1 |
| Isaac Bentham | United Kingdom | M | swimming 1, water polo 1 | 1912 | 1912 | 1 |
| Erik Bergqvist | Sweden | M | football 1, swimming 1, water polo 2 | 1912 | 1920 | 2 |
| Sam Bewley | New Zealand | M | mountain bike cycling 1, track cycling 2 | 2008 | 2012 | 2 |
| Adi Bharucha | India | M | swimming 1, water polo 1 | 1952 | 1952 | 1 |
| George Blake | Australasia | M | athletics 1, boxing 1 | 1908 | 1908 | 1 |
| Conrad Böcker | German Empire | M | athletics 1, gymnastics 1 | 1896 | 1896 | 1 |
| Victor Boin | Belgium | M | fencing 3, swimming 1, water polo 2 | 1908 | 1924 | 4 |
| Jimmy Brady | Ireland | M | swimming 1, water polo 2 | 1924 | 1928 | 2 |
| David Bratton | United States | M | diving 1, swimming 1, water polo 1 | 1904 | 1904 | 1 |
| Wilbur Burroughs | United States | M | athletics 2, tug of war 1 | 1900 | 1908 | 2 |
| Carlos Castro | Argentina | M | swimming 1, water polo 1 | 1928 | 1928 | 1 |
| Federico Cesarano | Kingdom of Italy | M | fencing 3, shooting 1 | 1908 | 1924 | 4 |
| Charles Champaud | Bulgaria, Switzerland | M | athletics 1, gymnastics 1 | 1896 | 1896 | 1 |
| Ran Chandnani | India | M | swimming 1, water polo 1 | 1952 | 1952 | 1 |
| Dimitrios Christopoulos | Kingdom of Greece | M | athletics 1, swimming 1 | 1896 | 1896 | 1 |
| Luka Ciganović | Yugoslavia | M | swimming 1, water polo 2 | 1936 | 1948 | 2 |
| Antonius Colenbrander | Netherlands | M | equestrian eventing 1, equestrian jumping 1, fencing 1 | 1924 | 1928 | 2 |
| Zoltán Csányi | Kingdom of Hungary | M | athletics 1, basketball 1 | 1936 | 1936 | 1 |
| Zbigniew Czech | Poland | M | art competitions 1, rowing 1 | 1928 | 1932 | 2 |
| Giuseppe D'Altrui | Italy | M | swimming 1, water polo 3 | 1956 | 1972 | 4 |
| Herman Alexander de By | Netherlands | M | boxing 1, swimming 1 | 1900 | 1908 | 2 |
| Henri Decoin | France | M | swimming 2, water polo 1 | 1908 | 1912 | 2 |
| Charles Dieges | United States | M | athletics 1, tug of war 1 | 1904 | 1904 | 1 |
| Marco Diener | France | M | swimming 1, water polo 2 | 1936 | 1948 | 2 |
| Hayes Dockrell | Ireland | M | swimming 1, water polo 1 | 1928 | 1928 | 1 |
| Herman Doerner | Australia | M | swimming 1, water polo 1 | 1948 | 1948 | 1 |
| Émile-Georges Drigny | France | M | swimming 2, water polo 1 | 1908 | 1920 | 3 |
| Taha Youssef El-Gamal | Egypt | M | swimming 2, water polo 2 | 1948 | 1952 | 2 |
| Georg Erdmann | Norway | M | fencing 1, shooting 1 | 1908 | 1908 | 1 |
| José Escribens | Perù | M | fencing 1, modern pentathlon 1 | 1936 | 1936 | 1 |
| Cecil Fagan | Ireland | M | swimming 1, water polo 2 | 1924 | 1928 | 2 |
| Jack Ferguson | Australia | M | swimming 1, water polo 1 | 1948 | 1948 | 1 |
| Fernand Feyaerts | Belgium | M | swimming 2, water polo 2 | 1900 | 1908 | 2 |
| Antoine Fiolet | France | M | swimming 1, water polo 1 | 1900 | 1900 | 1 |
| Léon Flameng | France | M | road cycling 1, track cycling 1 | 1896 | 1896 | 1 |
| Alfred Flatow | German Empire | M | athletics 1, gymnastics 1 | 1896 | 1896 | 1 |
| Gustav Flatow | German Empire | M | athletics 1, gymnastics 2 | 1896 | 1900 | 2 |
| Nilo Floody | Chile | M | fencing 1, modern pentathlon 3 | 1948 | 1956 | 3 |
| Robert Förstemann | Germany | M | mountain bike cycling 1, track cycling 1 | 2012 | 2012 | 1 |
| Jim Fox | United Kingdom | M | fencing 1, modern pentathlon 4 | 1964 | 1976 | 4 |
| D. Frangopoulos | Kingdom of Greece | M | swimming 1, tennis 1 | 1896 | 1896 | 1 |
| Hernán Fuentes | Chile | M | fencing 1, modern pentathlon 2 | 1948 | 1952 | 2 |
| Maximino García | Uruguay | M | swimming 1, water polo 1 | 1936 | 1936 | 1 |
| Lindsay Gaze | Australia | M | Australian rules football 1, basketball 1 | 1956 | 1964 | 2 |
| Nikolaos Georgantas | Kingdom of Greece | M | athletics 3, tug of war 1 | 1904 | 1912 | 3 |
| Samir Gharbo | Egypt | M | swimming 2, water polo 2 | 1948 | 1952 | 2 |
| Augustus Goessling | United States | M | diving 1, swimming 1, water polo 1 | 1904 | 1908 | 2 |
| Charles Gondouin | France | M | athletics 1, rugby 1, tug of war 1 | 1900 | 1900 | 1 |
| Leo Goodwin | United States | M | swimming 3, water polo 1 | 1904 | 1912 | 3 |
| Frank Gosling | Bermuda | M | diving 2, swimming 1 | 1948 | 1952 | 2 |
| Enrique Granados | Spain | M | swimming 1, water polo 1 | 1952 | 1952 | 1 |
| Adolphe Grisel | France | M | athletics 1, gymnastics 1, swimming 1 | 1896 | 1896 | 1 |
| Sverre Grøner | Norway | M | athletics 1, gymnastics 1 | 1908 | 1912 | 2 |
| Imre Győrffy | Kingdom of Hungary | M | road cycling 1, track cycling 1 | 1932 | 1936 | 2 |
| Olivér Halassy | Kingdom of Hungary | M | swimming 1, water polo 3 | 1928 | 1936 | 3 |
| Jack Hakim | Egypt | M | swimming 2, water polo 1 | 1948 | 1952 | 2 |
| Jam Handy | United States | M | swimming 1, water polo 1 | 1904 | 1924 | 2 |
| Panagiotis Hatzikyriakakis | Kingdom of Greece | M | swimming 1, water polo 1 | 1948 | 1948 | 1 |
| Jenő Hégner-Tóth | Kingdom of Hungary | M | swimming 1, water polo 1 | 1908 | 1912 | 2 |
| Hans Hellbrand | Sweden | M | swimming 1, water polo 1 | 1948 | 1952 | 2 |
| Otto Herschmann | Austrian Empire | M | fencing 2, swimming 1 | 1896 | 1924 | 3 |
| Philippe Houben | Belgium | M | swimming 1, water polo 1 | 1900 | 1900 | 1 |
| Ludwig Hussak | Austrian Empire | M | athletics 1, football 1 | 1908 | 1912 | 2 |
| Olaf Ingebretsen | Norway | M | athletics 1, gymnastics 1 | 1912 | 1912 | 1 |
| Hans Jacobson | Sweden | M | fencing 3, modern pentathlon 1 | 1968 | 1980 | 4 |
| Ahmed Jaouadi | Tunisia | M | marathon swimming 1, swimming 1 | 2024 | 2024 | 1 |
| László Jeney | Hungary | M | swimming 1, water polo 4 | 1948 | 1960 | 4 |
| Victor Johansson | Sweden | M | marathon swimming 1, swimming 2 | 2020 | 2024 | 2 |
| Frank Jordan | Australia | M | swimming 1, water polo 1 | 1952 | 1952 | 1 |
| Åke Julin | Sweden | M | swimming 1, water polo 2 | 1936 | 1952 | 3 |
| Gyula Kakas | Kingdom of Hungary | M | athletics 1, gymnastics 2 | 1896 | 1900 | 2 |
| Nicolas Kanivé | Luxembourg | M | athletics 2, gymnastics 1 | 1912 | 1920 | 2 |
| Tivadar Kanizsa | Hungary, Hungary | M | swimming 1, water polo 3 | 1956 | 1964 | 3 |
| György Kárpáti | Hungary, Hungary, Hungary | M | swimming 1, water polo 4 | 1952 | 1964 | 4 |
| Georg Karth | German Empire | M | athletics 1, gymnastics 1 | 1908 | 1908 | 1 |
| Berndt Katter | Finland | M | fencing 1, modern pentathlon 2 | 1956 | 1960 | 2 |
| Frederick Keeping | United Kingdom | M | road cycling 1, track cycling 1 | 1896 | 1896 | 1 |
| Mohammad Khan | Afghanistan | M | athletics 1, field hockey 1 | 1936 | 1936 | 1 |
| Adolphe Klingelhoefer | France | M | athletics 1, tennis 1 | 1900 | 1900 | 1 |
| Bernard Knubel | German Empire | M | road cycling 1, track cycling 1 | 1896 | 1896 | 1 |
| Georgios Koletis | Kingdom of Greece | M | road cycling 1, track cycling 1 | 1896 | 1896 | 1 |
| Josef Kopecký | Czechoslovakia | M | athletics 1, shooting 1 | 1920 | 1936 | 2 |
| Valcho Kostov | Bulgaria | M | athletics 1, wrestling 1 | 1960 | 1964 | 2 |
| Boo Kullberg | Sweden | M | fencing 1, gymnastics 1 | 1912 | 1912 | 1 |
| Louis Laufray | France | M | swimming 2, water polo 1 | 1900 | 1912 | 2 |
| Erik de Laval | Sweden | M | fencing 1, modern pentathlon 1 | 1912 | 1920 | 2 |
| Patrik de Laval | Sweden | M | fencing 1, modern pentathlon 1, shooting 1 | 1912 | 1912 | 1 |
| Victor de Laveleye | Belgium | M | hockey 1, tennis 2 | 1920 | 1928 | 3 |
| Marrit Leenstra | Netherlands | F | beach volleyball 1, volleyball 2 | 1992 | 2004 | 3 |
| Dezső Lemhényi | Hungary | M | swimming 1, water polo 2 | 1948 | 1952 | 2 |
| René Lériche | France | M | swimming 1, water polo 1 | 1900 | 1900 | 1 |
| Theodor Leupold | German Empire | M | road cycling 1, track cycling 1 | 1896 | 1896 | 1 |
| Axel Ljung | Sweden | M | athletics 1, gymnastics 1 | 1908 | 1908 | 1 |
| Emrys Lloyd | United Kingdom | M | fencing 4, rowing 1 | 1932 | 1952 | 4 |
| Eero Lohi | Finland | M | fencing 1, modern pentathlon 1 | 1960 | 1960 | 1 |
| Mario de Lorenzo | Brazil | M | swimming 1, water polo 1 | 1932 | 1932 | 1 |
| Fritz Manteuffel | German Empire | M | athletics 1, gymnastics 2, road cycling 1 | 1896 | 1900 | 2 |
| Eric Marques | Brazil | M | fencing 1, modern pentathlon 1 | 1952 | 1968 | 2 |
| George Marshall | United Kingdom | M | athletics 1, tennis 1 | 1896 | 1896 | 1 |
| Paul Masson | France | M | road cycling 1, track cycling 1 | 1896 | 1896 | 1 |
| Paddy McClure | Ireland | M | swimming 1, water polo 1 | 1928 | 1928 | 1 |
| Archie McDiarmid | Canada | M | athletics 1, boxing 1 | 1920 | 1920 | 1 |
| Leroy Mercer | United States | M | athletics 2, baseball 1 | 1908 | 1912 | 2 |
| Hylton Mitchell | Trinidad and Tobago | M | athletics 1, road cycling 1, track cycling 1 | 1956 | 1956 | 1 |
| James Mitchel | United States | M | athletics 2, tug of war 1 | 1904 | 1912 | 2 |
| Dilip Mitra | India | M | swimming 1, water polo 1 | 1948 | 1948 | 1 |
| Carol Montgomery | Canada | F | athletics 1, triathlon 2 | 2000 | 2004 | 2 |
| Sjoerd Mooi Wilten | Netherlands | M | swimming 1, water polo 1 | 1936 | 1936 | 1 |
| Sachin Nag | India | M | swimming 2, water polo 2 | 1948 | 1952 | 2 |
| Jehangir Naegamwalla | India | M | swimming 1, water polo 1 | 1952 | 1952 | 1 |
| Frank Nelson | United States | M | athletics 2, baseball 1 | 1908 | 1912 | 2 |
| Ahmed Fouad Nessim | Egypt | M | swimming 1, water polo 2 | 1948 | 1952 | 2 |
| Karl Neukirch | German Empire | M | athletics 1, gymnastics 1 | 1896 | 1896 | 1 |
| Holger Nielsen | Denmark | M | athletics 1, fencing 1, shooting 1, swimming 1 | 1896 | 1896 | 1 |
| Ilmari Niemeläinen | Finland | M | art competitions 1, diving 2, swimming 1 | 1936 | 1948 | 2 |
| Stamatios Nikolopoulos | Kingdom of Greece | M | road cycling 1, track cycling 1 | 1896 | 1896 | 1 |
| Henrik Norby | Norway | M | fencing 1, modern pentathlon 1 | 1912 | 1912 | 1 |
| Iosif Novac | Socialist Republic of Romania | M | swimming 1, water polo 1 | 1952 | 1952 | 1 |
| Michael O'Connor | Ireland | M | swimming 1, water polo 2 | 1924 | 1928 | 2 |
| Raoul Paoli | France | M | athletics 5, rowing 1, wrestling 1 | 1900 | 1928 | 6 |
| Tjeerd Pasma | Netherlands | M | athletics 1, modern pentathlon 1 | 1928 | 1928 | 1 |
| Guilherme Patroni | Portugal | M | swimming 1, water polo 1 | 1952 | 1952 | 1 |
| Norman Patterson | United States | M | athletics 2, baseball 1 | 1908 | 1912 | 2 |
| George Patton | United States | M | fencing 1, modern pentathlon 1 | 1912 | 1912 | 1 |
| Carl Alfred Pedersen | Denmark | M | athletics 1, gymnastics 2 | 1908 | 1912 | 2 |
| José María Peña | Restoration (Spain) | M | athletics 1, football 1 | 1924 | 1924 | 1 |
| Herbert von Petersdorff | German Empire | M | swimming 1, water polo 1 | 1900 | 1900 | 1 |
| Joseph Pletincx | Belgium | M | swimming 1, water polo 4 | 1908 | 1924 | 4 |
| Alexandru Popescu | Socialist Republic of Romania | M | swimming 2, water polo 1 | 1956 | 1960 | 2 |
| Luis Pratsmasó | Restoration (Spain), Spain | M | athletics 1, field hockey 1 | 1936 | 1948 | 2 |
| Valentin Prokopov | Soviet Union | M | swimming 1, water polo 2 | 1952 | 1956 | 2 |
| Niño Ramírez | Philippines | M | athletics 1, basketball 1 | 1936 | 1936 | 1 |
| Frantz Reichel | France | M | athletics 1, rugby 1, swimming 1 | 1896 | 1900 | 2 |
| Jean Rodier | France | M | swimming 1, water polo 1 | 1912 | 1912 | 1 |
| André Roosevelt | France | M | athletics 1, rugby 1 | 1900 | 1900 | 1 |
| Joseph Rosemeyer | German Empire | M | road cycling 1, track cycling 1 | 1896 | 1896 | 1 |
| Ray Ruddy | United States | M | swimming 1, water polo 2 | 1928 | 1936 | 3 |
| Abrahão Saliture | Brazil | M | rowing 1, water polo 2 | 1920 | 1932 | 2 |
| Aarne Salovaara | Finland | M | athletics 2, gymnastics 2 | 1908 | 1912 | 2 |
| Adolf Schmal | Austrian Empire | M | fencing 1, road cycling 1, track cycling 1 | 1896 | 1896 | 1 |
| Otto Scheff | Austrian Empire | M | swimming 2, water polo 1 | 1908 | 1912 | 2 |
| Pippo Schembri | Malta | M | swimming 1, water polo 1 | 1936 | 1936 | 1 |
| Hans Schöchlin | Switzerland | M | art competitions 1, rowing 2 | 1924 | 1936 | 3 |
| Gustav Schuft | German Empire | M | athletics 1, gymnastics 1 | 1896 | 1896 | 1 |
| Albert Schumberg | Weimar Republic | M | swimming 1, water polo 1 | 1928 | 1932 | 2 |
| Edgar Seligman | United Kingdom | M | art competitions 2, fencing 5 | 1896 | 1932 | 7 |
| Yury Shlyapin | Soviet Union | M | swimming 1, water polo 2 | 1952 | 1956 | 2 |
| Erik Skoglund | Sweden | M | swimming 1, water polo 1 | 1924 | 1924 | 1 |
| Nils Skoglund | Sweden | M | rowing 1, water polo 1 | 1920 | 1924 | 2 |
| Carl Silfverstrand | Sweden | M | athletics 2, gymnastics 1 | 1908 | 1912 | 2 |
| Balkrishan Singh | India | M | athletics 1, field hockey 2 | 1956 | 1960 | 2 |
| Viktor Smeds | Finland, Finland | M | boxing 1, gymnastics 1 | 1908 | 1924 | 2 |
| Elemér Somfay | Kingdom of Hungary | M | athletics 2, modern pentathlon 1 | 1924 | 1932 | 3 |
| Boyty Staudt | Luxembourg | M | swimming 1, water polo 1 | 1928 | 1936 | 2 |
| Santiago Stipanicic | Argentina | M | swimming 1, water polo 1 | 1928 | 1928 | 1 |
| Henri Stoelen | Belgium | M | swimming 1, water polo 1 | 1928 | 1936 | 2 |
| Sidney Stranne | Sweden | M | fencing 2, modern pentathlon 1 | 1912 | 1928 | 2 |
| Luis Subercaseaux | Chile | M | athletics 1, road cycling 1 | 1896 | 1896 | 1 |
| Eurico Surgey | Portugal | M | swimming 1, water polo 1 | 1952 | 1952 | 1 |
| Kálmán Szabó | Kingdom of Hungary | M | athletics 1, gymnastics 1 | 1908 | 1908 | 1 |
| Károly Szittya | Hungary | M | swimming 1, water polo 2 | 1948 | 1952 | 2 |
| Momčilo Tapavica | Kingdom of Hungary | M | athletics 1, tennis 1, weightlifting 1, wrestling 1 | 1896 | 1896 | 1 |
| Jean-Pierre Thommes | Luxembourg | M | athletics 1, gymnastics 1 | 1912 | 1912 | 1 |
| Jean Thorailler | France | M | swimming 1, water polo 2 | 1912 | 1920 | 2 |
| Charles Treffel | France | M | swimming 1, water polo 1 | 1900 | 1900 | 1 |
| Bill Tuttle | United States | M | swimming 2, water polo 1 | 1900 | 1904 | 2 |
| Georgios Valakakis | Kingdom of Greece | M | fencing 2, swimming 1 | 1896 | 1912 | 2 |
| Paul Vasseur | France | M | swimming 2, water polo 3 | 1900 | 1920 | 3 |
| George Van Cleaf | United States | M | diving 1, swimming 1, water polo 1 | 1904 | 1904 | 1 |
| Charles Vanoni | United States | M | athletics 1, track cycling 1 | 1896 | 1900 | 2 |
| Annie Villiger | Switzerland | F | diving 1, swimming 1 | 1936 | 1936 | 1 |
| Charles Voigt | France, United States | M | golf 1, tennis 1 | 1900 | 1900 | 1 |
| Jan de Vries | Netherlands | M | athletics 3, football 1 | 1920 | 1928 | 3 |
| Wilhelm Weber | German Empire | M | athletics 1, gymnastics 2 | 1904 | 1908 | 2 |
| Dezső Wein | Kingdom of Hungary | M | athletics 1, gymnastics 1 | 1896 | 1896 | 1 |
| Hermann Weingärtner | German Empire | M | athletics 1, gymnastics 1 | 1896 | 1896 | 1 |
| János Wenk | Kingdom of Hungary | M | swimming 1, water polo 3 | 1912 | 1928 | 3 |
| Joseph Welzenbacher | German Empire | M | road cycling 1, track cycling 1 | 1896 | 1896 | 1 |
| Rodney Wilkes | Trinidad and Tobago | M | athletics 1, weightlifting 3 | 1948 | 1956 | 3 |
| Charles Winckler | Denmark | M | athletics 2, swimming 1, tug of war 1 | 1896 | 1900 | 2 |
| José Maria Yermo | Restoration (Spain) | M | athletics 1, football 1, track cycling 1 | 1924 | 1928 | 2 |

=== By nation ===
In the next list there are the athletes of the table divided by nation. The total of this table is 198 because 1 athlete have competed for 2 nations.

| Country | Number of athletes | M | F |
|---|---|---|---|
| Afghanistan | 1 | 1 | 0 |
| Argentina | 2 | 2 | 0 |
| Australasia | 1 | 1 | 0 |
| Australia | 4 | 4 | 0 |
| Austrian Empire | 4 | 4 | 0 |
| Belgium | 6 | 6 | 0 |
| Bermuda | 1 | 1 | 0 |
| Brazil | 3 | 3 | 0 |
| Bulgaria, Bulgaria | 2 | 2 | 0 |
| Canada, Canada | 2 | 1 | 1 |
| Chile | 3 | 3 | 0 |
| Czechoslovakia | 1 | 1 | 0 |
| Denmark | 3 | 3 | 0 |
| Egypt | 4 | 4 | 0 |
| Finland, Finland | 6 | 6 | 0 |
| France | 19 | 19 | 0 |
| German Empire | 15 | 15 | 0 |
| Germany | 1 | 1 | 0 |
| Hungary, Hungary, Hungary, Hungary | 6 | 6 | 0 |
| India | 8 | 8 | 0 |
| Ireland | 5 | 5 | 0 |
| Italy | 1 | 1 | 0 |
| Kingdom of Greece | 8 | 8 | 0 |
| Kingdom of Hungary | 12 | 12 | 0 |
| Kingdom of Italy | 1 | 1 | 0 |
| Luxembourg | 3 | 3 | 0 |
| Malta | 1 | 1 | 0 |
| Netherlands | 6 | 5 | 1 |
| New Zealand | 1 | 1 | 0 |
| Norway | 4 | 4 | 0 |
| Perù | 2 | 2 | 0 |
| Philippines | 1 | 1 | 0 |
| Poland | 1 | 1 | 0 |
| Portugal | 2 | 2 | 0 |
| Restoration (Spain) | 3 (Note: Luis Pratsmasó competed 1 time for Spain) | 3 | 0 |
| Russian Empire | 1 | 1 | 0 |
| Socialist Republic of Romania | 2 | 2 | 0 |
| Soviet Union | 2 | 2 | 0 |
| Spain | 4 (Note: Luis Pratsmasó competed 1 time for Restoration (Spain)) | 4 | 0 |
| Sweden | 14 | 14 | 0 |
| Switzerland | 2 | 1 | 1 |
| Trinidad and Tobago, Trinidad and Tobago | 2 | 2 | 0 |
| Tunisia | 2 | 2 | 0 |
| United Kingdom | 7 | 7 | 0 |
| United States | 16 | 16 | 0 |
| Uruguay | 1 | 1 | 0 |
| Weimar Republic | 1 | 1 | 0 |
| Yugoslavia | 1 | 1 | 0 |
| Total | 198 | 195 | 3 |

== See also ==
- List of athletes with the most appearances at Olympic Games
- List of athletes who competed in both the Summer and Winter Olympics
- List of athletes who competed in more than one sport at Winter Olympic games
- List of multi-sport athletes
