= Modern pentathlon at the 1912 Summer Olympics =

Men's modern pentathlon at the Games of the V Olympiad
- Dates: July 7–12, 1912
- Competitors: 32 from 10 nations

Medalists
| 1st place, gold medalist(s) | | Gösta Lilliehöök | Sweden |
| 2nd place, silver medalist(s) | | Gösta Åsbrink | Sweden |
| 3rd place, bronze medalist(s) | | Georg de Laval | Sweden |

Modern pentathlon was first contested at the Olympic Games at the 1912 Summer Olympics in Stockholm. The sport was invented by Baron Pierre de Coubertin, the founder of the modern Olympic Games.

A lost points system was used, in which the athlete lost the same number of points corresponding to his position in each modality. Thus, the first position resulted in 1 Lost Point, the second position 2 Lost Points, and so on. At the end, the classification was obtained by adding up the lost points, and the placements were assigned in ascending order of the number of points lost by each competitor.

Future Second World War General George S. Patton represented the United States in the pentathlon. Notably instead of using a lighter and smaller .22 pistol for the shooting event, he insisted on using his .38 Colt Army Special service weapon (because he believed this was more in keeping with the martial nature of the pentathlon). The larger caliber though left larger holes in the target; the judges deemed Patton had missed because there were fewer holes than shots fired. Patton argued his accuracy had resulted in bullets passing through the same large holes. The judges remained unconvinced. He finished 5th overall.

== Participating nations ==
A total of 32 athletes from 11 nations competed at the Stockholm Games:

- Austria (1)
- Denmark (4)
- Finland (4)
- France (1)
- Germany (1)
- Great Britain (1)
- Netherlands (1)
- Norway (1)
- Russian Empire (5)
- Sweden (12)
- United States (1)

== Results ==
=== Shooting ===
Event 1
| Place | Athlete | Score | Shoot-off | Points |
|---|---|---|---|---|
| 1 | Gösta Åsbrink (SWE) | 193 | | 1 |
| 2 | Georg de Laval (SWE) | 192 | 188 | 2 |
| 3 | Gösta Lilliehöök (SWE) | 192 | 183 | 3 |
| 4 | Hugh Durant (GBR) | 191 | | 4 |
| 5 | Patrik de Laval (SWE) | 188 | | 5 |
| 6 | Boris Nepokupnoy (RUS) | 185 | 191 | 6 |
| 7 | Erik de Laval (SWE) | 185 | 189 | 7 |
| 8 | Eric Carlberg (SWE) | 185 | 185 | 8 |
| 9 | Erik Wersäll (SWE) | 182 | | 9 |
| 10 | Nils Häggström (SWE) | 180 | | 10 |
| 11 | Oskar Wilkman (RUS) | 176 | 165 | 11 |
| 12 | James Stranne (SWE) | 176 | 150 | 12 |
| 13 | Ralph Clilverd (GBR) | 172 | | 13 |
| 14 | Bror Mannström (SWE) | 171 | | 14 |
| 15 | Douglas Godfree (GBR) | 166 | | 15 |
| 16 | Jean de Mas Latrie (FRA) | 161 | | 16 |
| 17 | Weli Hohenthal (RUS) | 159 | | 17 |
| 18 | Åke Grönhagen (SWE) | 158 | | 18 |
| 19 | Carl Aejemelaeus (RUS) | 151 | | 19 |
| 20 | George S. Patton (USA) | 150 | | 20 |
| 21 | Jetze Doorman (NED) | 149 | | 21 |
| 22 | Gustaf Lewenhaupt (SWE) | 148 | | 22 |
| 23 | Carl Paaske (NOR) | 147 | | 23 |
| 24 | Arno Almqvist (RUS) | 143 | | 24 |
| 25 | Vilhelm Laybourn (DEN) | 140 | | 25 |
| 26 | Edmond Bernhardt (AUT) | 135 | | 26 |
| 27 | Henrik Norby (NOR) | 110 | | 27 |
| 28 | Carl Pauen (GER) | 102 | | 28 |
| 29 | Georges Brulé (FRA) | 100 | | 29 |
| 30 | Theodor Zeilau (DEN) | 93 | | 30 |
| 31 | Johannes Ussing (DEN) | 57 | | 31 |
| 32 | Kai Jølver (DEN) | 52 | | 32 |

=== Swimming ===
Event 2
| Place | Athlete | Time | Score |
|---|---|---|---|
| 1 | Ralph Clilverd (GBR) | 4:58.4 | 1 |
| 2 | Edmond Bernhardt (AUT) | 5:03.6 | 2 |
| 3 | Georg de Laval (SWE) | 5:28.0 | 3 |
| 4 | Gösta Åsbrink (SWE) | 5:46.0 | 4 |
| 5 | Åke Grönhagen (SWE) | 5:49.6 | 5 |
| 6 | Douglas Godfree (GBR) | 5:54.0 | 6 |
| 7 | George S. Patton (USA) | 5:55.6 | 7 |
| 8 | Erik Wersäll (SWE) | 5:56.2 | 8 |
| 9 | James Stranne (SWE) | 6:00.8 | 9 |
| 10 | Gösta Lilliehöök (SWE) | 6:05.8 | 10 |
| 11 | Aarno Almqvist (RUS) | 6:06.0 | 11 |
| 12 | Gustaf Lewenhaupt (SWE) | 6:10.4 | 12 |
| 13 | Erik de Laval (SWE) | 6:20.0 | 13 |
| 14 | Bror Mannström (SWE) | 6:28.8 | 14 |
| 15 | Nils Häggström (SWE) | 6:35.8 | 15 |
| 16 | Carl Paaske (NOR) | 6:49.2 | 16 |
| 17 | Patrik de Laval (SWE) | 6:54.4 | 17 |
| 18 | Georges Brulé (FRA) | 7:04.4 | 18 |
| 19 | Weli Hohenthal (RUS) | 7:38.8 | 19 |
| 20 | Johannes Ussing (DEN) | 7:40.2 | 20 |
| 21 | Henrik Norby (NOR) | 7:48.6 | 21 |
| 22 | Theodor Zeilau (DEN) | 7:59.4 | 22 |
| 23 | Oskar Wilkman (RUS) | 8:11.6 | 23 |
| 24 | Boris Nepokupnoy (RUS) | 8:16.6 | 24 |
| 25 | Carl Aejemelaeus (RUS) | 8:59.8 | 25 |
| 26 | Kai Jølver (DEN) | 9:32.6 | 26 |
| 27 | Jean de Mas Latrie (FRA) | 10:03.0 | 27 |
| 28 | Hugh Durant (GBR) | 10:07.0 | 28 |
| 29 | Vilhelm Laybourn (DEN) | 12:09.6 | 29 |
| - | Eric Carlberg (SWE) | DNS | - |
| - | Jetze Doorman (NED) | DNS | - |
| - | Carl Pauen (GER) | DNS | - |

After 2 events
| Place | Athlete | Shooting | Swimming | Total |
|---|---|---|---|---|
| 1 | Gösta Åsbrink (SWE) | 1 | 4 | 5 |
| 1 | Georg de Laval (SWE) | 2 | 3 | 5 |
| 3 | Ralph Clilverd (GBR) | 12 | 1 | 13 |
| 3 | Gösta Lilliehöök (SWE) | 3 | 10 | 13 |
| 5 | Erik Wersäll (SWE) | 9 | 8 | 17 |
| 6 | Erik de Laval (SWE) | 7 | 13 | 20 |
| 6 | James Stranne (SWE) | 11 | 9 | 20 |
| 8 | Douglas Godfree (GBR) | 16 | 6 | 22 |
| 8 | Patrik de Laval (SWE) | 5 | 17 | 22 |
| 10 | Åke Grönhagen (SWE) | 18 | 5 | 23 |
| 11 | Edmond Bernhardt (AUT) | 26 | 2 | 28 |
| 11 | Nils Häggström (SWE) | 13 | 15 | 28 |
| 11 | Bror Mannström (SWE) | 14 | 14 | 28 |
| 11 | George S. Patton (USA) | 21 | 7 | 28 |
| 15 | Boris Nepokupnoy (RUS) | 6 | 24 | 30 |
| 16 | Hugh Durant (GBR) | 4 | 28 | 32 |
| 17 | Oskar Wilkman (RUS) | 10 | 23 | 33 |
| 18 | Aarno Almqvist (RUS) | 23 | 11 | 34 |
| 19 | Carl Paaske (NOR) | 19 | 16 | 35 |
| 20 | Weli Hohenthal (RUS) | 17 | 19 | 36 |
| 20 | Gustaf Lewenhaupt (SWE) | 24 | 12 | 36 |
| 22 | Jean de Mas Latrie (FRA) | 15 | 27 | 42 |
| 23 | Carl Aejemelaeus (RUS) | 20 | 25 | 45 |
| 24 | Georges Brulé (FRA) | 28 | 18 | 46 |
| 25 | Henrik Norby (NOR) | 27 | 21 | 48 |
| 26 | Johannes Ussing (DEN) | 31 | 20 | 51 |
| 26 | Theodor Zeilau (DEN) | 29 | 22 | 51 |
| 28 | Vilhelm Laybourn (DEN) | 25 | 29 | 54 |
| 29 | Kai Jølver (DEN) | 32 | 26 | 58 |
| — | Eric Carlberg (SWE) | 8 | - | DNF-1 |
| — | Jetze Doorman (NED) | 22 | - | DNF-1 |
| — | Carl Pauen (GER) | 30 | - | DNF-1 |

=== Fencing ===
Event 3
| Place | Athlete | Wins | Touches | Score |
|---|---|---|---|---|
| 1 | Åke Grönhagen (SWE) | 24 | - | 1 |
| 2 | Jean de Mas Latrie (FRA) | 23 | 25 | 2 |
| 3 | James Stranne (SWE) | 21 | 21 | 3 |
| 4 | George S. Patton (USA) | 20 | 26 | 4 |
| 5 | Gösta Lilliehöök (SWE) | 17 | 12 | 5 |
| 6 | Edmond Bernhardt (AUT) | 17 | 18 | 6 |
| 7 | Hugh Durant (GBR) | 17 | 19 | 7 |
| 8 | Georges Brulé (FRA) | 16 | 13 | 8 |
| 9 | Ralph Clilverd (GBR) | 16 | 16 | 9 |
| 10 | Georg de Laval (SWE) | 15 | 12 | 10 |
| 11 | Erik de Laval (SWE) | 15 | 16 | 11 |
| 12 | Henrik Norby (NOR) | 14 | 17 | 12 |
| 13 | Patrik de Laval (SWE) | 13 | 10 | 13 |
| 14 | Carl Paaske (NOR) | 13 | 15 | 14 |
| 15 | Gösta Åsbrink (SWE) | 12 | 8 | 15 |
| 16 | Bror Mannström (SWE) | 12 | 10 | 16 |
| 17 | Douglas Godfree (GBR) | 12 | 15 | 17 |
| 18 | Nils Häggström (SWE) | 11 | 4 | 18 |
| 19 | Gustaf Lewenhaupt (SWE) | 8 | - | 19 |
| 20 | Oskar Wilkman (RUS) | 7 | 7 | 20 |
| 21 | Erik Wersäll (SWE) | 7 | 11 | 21 |
| 22 | Kai Jølver (DEN) | 7 | 13 | 22 |
| 23 | Johannes Ussing (DEN) | 6 | 8 | 23 |
| 24 | Vilhelm Laybourn (DEN) | 6 | 10 | 24 |
| 25 | Weli Hohenthal (RUS) | 5 | 7 | 25 |
| 26 | Theodor Zeilau (DEN) | 4 | 7 | 26 |
| 27 | Aarno Almqvist (RUS) | 3 | - | 27 |
| — | Carl Aejemelaeus (RUS) | DNS | | - |
| — | Boris Nepokupnoy (RUS) | DNS | | - |
| — | Eric Carlberg (SWE) | Elim. | | - |
| — | Jetze Doorman (NED) | Elim. | | - |
| — | Carl Pauen (GER) | Elim. | | - |

After 3 events
| Place | Athlete | Shooting | Swimming | Fencing | Total |
|---|---|---|---|---|---|
| 1 | Georg de Laval (SWE) | 2 | 3 | 10 | 15 |
| 2 | Gösta Lilliehöök (SWE) | 3 | 10 | 5 | 18 |
| 3 | Gösta Åsbrink (SWE) | 1 | 4 | 15 | 20 |
| 4 | Ralph Clilverd (GBR) | 12 | 1 | 9 | 22 |
| 5 | James Stranne (SWE) | 11 | 9 | 3 | 23 |
| 6 | Åke Grönhagen (SWE) | 18 | 5 | 1 | 24 |
| 7 | Erik de Laval (SWE) | 7 | 13 | 11 | 31 |
| 8 | George S. Patton (USA) | 20 | 7 | 4 | 31 |
| 9 | Edmond Bernhardt (AUT) | 26 | 2 | 6 | 34 |
| 10 | Patrik de Laval (SWE) | 5 | 17 | 13 | 35 |
| 11 | Erik Wersäll (SWE) | 9 | 8 | 21 | 38 |
| 12 | Hugh Durant (GBR) | 4 | 28 | 7 | 39 |
| 12 | Douglas Godfree (GBR) | 16 | 6 | 17 | 39 |
| 14 | Bror Mannström (SWE) | 14 | 14 | 16 | 44 |
| 14 | Jean de Mas Latrie (FRA) | 15 | 27 | 2 | 44 |
| 16 | Nils Häggström (SWE) | 13 | 15 | 18 | 46 |
| 17 | Carl Paaske (NOR) | 19 | 16 | 14 | 49 |
| 18 | Oskar Wilkman (RUS) | 10 | 23 | 20 | 53 |
| 19 | Georges Brulé (FRA) | 28 | 18 | 8 | 54 |
| 20 | Gustaf Lewenhaupt (SWE) | 24 | 12 | 19 | 55 |
| 21 | Henrik Norby (NOR) | 27 | 21 | 12 | 60 |
| 22 | Aarno Almqvist (RUS) | 23 | 11 | 27 | 61 |
| 22 | Weli Hohenthal (RUS) | 17 | 19 | 25 | 61 |
| 24 | Johannes Ussing (DEN) | 31 | 20 | 23 | 74 |
| 25 | Theodor Zeilau (DEN) | 29 | 22 | 26 | 77 |
| 26 | Vilhelm Laybourn (DEN) | 25 | 29 | 24 | 78 |
| 27 | Kai Jølver (DEN) | 32 | 26 | 22 | 80 |
| — | Carl Aejemelaeus (RUS) | 20 | 25 | - | DNF-2 |
| — | Boris Nepokupnoy (RUS) | 6 | 24 | - | DNF-2 |
| — | Eric Carlberg (SWE) | 8 | - | - | DNF-1 |
| — | Jetze Doorman (NED) | 22 | - | - | DNF-1 |
| — | Carl Pauen (GER) | 30 | - | - | DNF-1 |

=== Equestrian ===
Event 4
| Place | Athlete | Penalties | Time | Score |
|---|---|---|---|---|
| 1 | Åke Grönhagen (SWE) | 0 | 9:04.2 | 1 |
| 2 | Bror Mannström (SWE) | 0 | 9:36.2 | 2 |
| 3 | Georg de Laval (SWE) | 0 | 9:39.4 | 3 |
| 4 | Gösta Lilliehöök (SWE) | 0 | 9:45.5 | 4 |
| 5 | Oskar Wilkman (RUS) | 0 | 10:34.2 | 5 |
| 6 | George S. Patton (USA) | 0 | 10:42.0 | 6 |
| 7 | Gösta Åsbrink (SWE) | 0 | 11:12.4 | 7 |
| 8 | James Stranne (SWE) | 0 | 11:14.5 | 8 |
| 9 | Johannes Ussing (DEN) | 0 | 11:21.0 | 9 |
| 10 | Jean de Mas Latrie (FRA) | 0 | 11:26.0 | 10 |
| 11 | Douglas Godfree (GBR) | 0 | 11:43.9 | 11 |
| 12 | Edmond Bernhardt (AUT) | 0 | 12:01.6 | 12 |
| 13 | Aarno Almqvist (RUS) | 0 | 12:03.4 | 13 |
| 14 | Carl Paaske (NOR) | 0 | 12:33.0 | 14 |
| 15 | Gustaf Lewenhaupt (SWE) | 2 | 11:00.0 | 15 |
| 16 | Weli Hohenthal (RUS) | 2 | 11:11.8 | 16 |
| 17 | Patrik de Laval (SWE) | 2 | 13:15.0 | 17 |
| 18 | Hugh Durant (GBR) | 5 | 10:00.4 | 18 |
| 19 | Erik Wersäll (SWE) | 7 | 9:44.0 | 19 |
| 20 | Nils Häggström (SWE) | 7 | 13:26.0 | 20 |
| 22 | Kai Jølver (DEN) | 14 | 10:49.5 | 21 |
| 22 | Georges Brulé (FRA) | 38 | 13:44.6 | 22 |
| 23 | Ralph Clilverd (GBR) | 81 | 15:46.6 | 23 |
| — | Theodor Zeilau (DEN) | DNF | | - |
| — | Erik de Laval (SWE) | DQ | | - |
| — | Vilhelm Laybourn (DEN) | DQ | | - |
| — | Henrik Norby (NOR) | DQ | | - |
| — | Carl Aejemelaeus (RUS) | Elim. | | - |
| — | Eric Carlberg (SWE) | Elim. | | - |
| — | Jetze Doorman (NED) | Elim. | | - |
| — | Boris Nepokupnoy (RUS) | Elim. | | - |
| — | Carl Pauen (GER) | Elim. | | - |

After 4 events
| Place | Athlete | Shooting | Swimming | Fencing | Equestrian | Total |
|---|---|---|---|---|---|---|
| 1 | Georg de Laval (SWE) | 2 | 3 | 10 | 3 | 18 |
| 2 | Gösta Lilliehöök (SWE) | 3 | 10 | 5 | 4 | 22 |
| 3 | Åke Grönhagen (SWE) | 18 | 5 | 1 | 1 | 25 |
| 4 | Gösta Åsbrink (SWE) | 1 | 4 | 15 | 7 | 27 |
| 5 | James Stranne (SWE) | 11 | 9 | 3 | 8 | 31 |
| 6 | George S. Patton (USA) | 20 | 7 | 4 | 6 | 37 |
| 7 | Ralph Clilverd (GBR) | 12 | 1 | 9 | 23 | 45 |
| 8 | Edmond Bernhardt (AUT) | 26 | 2 | 6 | 12 | 46 |
| 8 | Bror Mannström (SWE) | 14 | 14 | 16 | 2 | 46 |
| 10 | Douglas Godfree (GBR) | 16 | 6 | 17 | 11 | 50 |
| 11 | Patrik de Laval (SWE) | 5 | 17 | 13 | 17 | 52 |
| 12 | Jean de Mas Latrie (FRA) | 15 | 27 | 2 | 10 | 54 |
| 13 | Hugh Durant (GBR) | 4 | 28 | 7 | 18 | 57 |
| 13 | Erik Wersäll (SWE) | 9 | 8 | 21 | 19 | 57 |
| 15 | Oskar Wilkman (RUS) | 10 | 23 | 20 | 5 | 58 |
| 16 | Carl Paaske (NOR) | 19 | 16 | 14 | 14 | 63 |
| 17 | Nils Häggström (SWE) | 13 | 15 | 18 | 20 | 66 |
| 18 | Gustaf Lewenhaupt (SWE) | 24 | 12 | 19 | 15 | 70 |
| 19 | Aarno Almqvist (RUS) | 23 | 11 | 27 | 13 | 74 |
| 20 | Georges Brulé (FRA) | 28 | 18 | 8 | 22 | 76 |
| 21 | Weli Hohenthal (RUS) | 17 | 19 | 25 | 16 | 77 |
| 22 | Johannes Ussing (DEN) | 31 | 20 | 23 | 9 | 83 |
| 23 | Kai Jølver (DEN) | 32 | 26 | 22 | 21 | 101 |
| — | Erik de Laval (SWE) | 7 | 13 | 11 | - | DNF-3 |
| — | Vilhelm Laybourn (DEN) | 25 | 29 | 24 | - | DNF-3 |
| — | Henrik Norby (NOR) | 27 | 21 | 12 | - | DNF-3 |
| — | Theodor Zeilau (DEN) | 29 | 22 | 26 | - | DNF-3 |
| — | Carl Aejemelaeus (RUS) | 20 | 25 | - | - | DNF-2 |
| — | Boris Nepokupnoy (RUS) | 6 | 24 | - | - | DNF-2 |
| — | Eric Carlberg (SWE) | 8 | - | - | - | DNF-1 |
| — | Jetze Doorman (NED) | 22 | - | - | - | DNF-1 |
| — | Carl Pauen (GER) | 30 | - | - | - | DNF-1 |

=== Athletics ===
Event 5
| Place | Athlete | Time | Score |
|---|---|---|---|
| 1 | Gösta Åsbrink (SWE) | 19:00.9 | 1 |
| 2 | Nils Häggström (SWE) | 19:04.0 | 2 |
| 3 | George S. Patton (USA) | 20:01.3 | 3 |
| 4 | Gustaf Lewenhaupt (SWE) | 20:16.7 | 4 |
| 5 | Gösta Lilliehöök (SWE) | 20:32.9 | 5 |
| 6 | Erik Wersäll (SWE) | 20:36.0 | 6 |
| 7 | Georges Brulé (FRA) | 20:48.4 | 7 |
| 8 | Carl Paaske (NOR) | 21:19.8 | 8 |
| 9 | Bror Mannström (SWE) | 21:21.9 | 9 |
| 10 | Åke Grönhagen (SWE) | 21:41.6 | 10 |
| 11 | James Stranne (SWE) | 21:45.1 | 11 |
| 12 | Georg de Laval (SWE) | 21:56.2 | 12 |
| 13 | Douglas Godfree (GBR) | 22:08.3 | 13 |
| 14 | Edmond Bernhardt (AUT) | 22:34.0 | 14 |
| 15 | Oskar Wilkman (RUS) | 22:57.8 | 15 |
| 16 | Aarno Almqvist (RUS) | 23:16.1 | 16 |
| 17 | Weli Hohenthal (RUS) | 23:28.6 | 17 |
| 18 | Ralph Clilverd (GBR) | 24:06.2 | 18 |
| 19 | Jean de Mas Latrie (FRA) | 24:17.4 | 19 |
| 20 | Patrik de Laval (SWE) | 24:19.6 | 20 |
| 21 | Hugh Durant (GBR) | 24:37.5 | 21 |
| 22 | Kai Jølver (DEN) | 26:08.6 | 22 |
| — | Johannes Ussing (DEN) | DNF | - |
| — | Carl Aejemelaeus (RUS) | Elim. | - |
| — | Eric Carlberg (SWE) | Elim. | - |
| — | Jetze Doorman (NED) | Elim. | - |
| — | Erik de Laval (SWE) | Elim. | - |
| — | Vilhelm Laybourn (DEN) | Elim. | - |
| — | Boris Nepokupnoy (RUS) | Elim. | - |
| — | Henrik Norby (NOR) | Elim. | - |
| — | Carl Pauen (GER) | Elim. | - |
| — | Theodor Zeilau (DEN) | Elim. | - |

Final standings
| Place | Athlete | Shooting | Swimming | Fencing | Equestrian | Athletics | Total |
|---|---|---|---|---|---|---|---|
| 1st place, gold medalist(s) | Gösta Lilliehöök (SWE) | 3 | 10 | 5 | 4 | 5 | 27 |
| 2nd place, silver medalist(s) | Gösta Åsbrink (SWE) | 1 | 4 | 15 | 7 | 1 | 28 |
| 3rd place, bronze medalist(s) | Georg de Laval (SWE) | 2 | 3 | 10 | 3 | 12 | 30 |
| 4 | Åke Grönhagen (SWE) | 18 | 5 | 1 | 1 | 10 | 35 |
| 5 | George S. Patton (USA) | 20 | 7 | 4 | 6 | 3 | 40 |
| 6 | James Stranne (SWE) | 11 | 9 | 3 | 8 | 11 | 42 |
| 7 | Bror Mannström (SWE) | 14 | 14 | 16 | 2 | 9 | 55 |
| 8 | Edmond Bernhardt (AUT) | 26 | 2 | 6 | 12 | 14 | 60 |
| 9 | Ralph Clilverd (GBR) | 12 | 1 | 9 | 23 | 18 | 63 |
| 9 | Douglas Godfree (GBR) | 16 | 6 | 17 | 11 | 13 | 63 |
| 9 | Erik Wersäll (SWE) | 9 | 8 | 21 | 19 | 6 | 63 |
| 12 | Nils Häggström (SWE) | 13 | 15 | 18 | 20 | 2 | 68 |
| 13 | Carl Paaske (NOR) | 19 | 16 | 14 | 14 | 8 | 71 |
| 14 | Patrik de Laval (SWE) | 5 | 17 | 13 | 17 | 20 | 72 |
| 15 | Jean de Mas Latrie (FRA) | 15 | 27 | 2 | 10 | 19 | 73 |
| 15 | Oskar Wilkman (RUS) | 10 | 23 | 20 | 5 | 15 | 73 |
| 17 | Gustaf Lewenhaupt (SWE) | 24 | 12 | 19 | 15 | 4 | 74 |
| 18 | Hugh Durant (GBR) | 4 | 28 | 7 | 18 | 21 | 78 |
| 19 | Georges Brulé (FRA) | 28 | 18 | 8 | 22 | 7 | 83 |
| 20 | Aarno Almqvist (RUS) | 23 | 11 | 27 | 13 | 16 | 90 |
| 21 | Weli Hohenthal (RUS) | 17 | 19 | 25 | 16 | 17 | 94 |
| 22 | Kai Jølver (DEN) | 32 | 26 | 22 | 21 | 22 | 123 |
| — | Johannes Ussing (DEN) | 31 | 20 | 23 | 9 | - | DNF-4 |
| — | Erik de Laval (SWE) | 7 | 13 | 11 | - | - | DNF-3 |
| — | Vilhelm Laybourn (DEN) | 25 | 29 | 24 | - | - | DNF-3 |
| — | Henrik Norby (NOR) | 27 | 21 | 12 | - | - | DNF-3 |
| — | Theodor Zeilau (DEN) | 29 | 22 | 26 | - | - | DNF-3 |
| — | Carl Aejemelaeus (RUS) | 20 | 25 | - | - | - | DNF-2 |
| — | Boris Nepokupnoy (RUS) | 6 | 24 | - | - | - | DNF-2 |
| — | Eric Carlberg (SWE) | 8 | - | - | - | - | DNF-1 |
| — | Jetze Doorman (NED) | 22 | - | - | - | - | DNF-1 |
| — | Carl Pauen (GER) | 30 | - | - | - | - | DNF-1 |
