= Charles Lewenhaupt =

Charles Lewenhaupt may refer to:

- Gustaf Lewenhaupt (1879–1962), Swedish count, horse rider and modern pentathlete
- Charles Lewenhaupt (equestrian) (1881–1936), brother of Gustaf and also a horse rider
- Charles Emil Lewenhaupt (1691–1743), Swedish general
