= Paaske =

Paaske is a surname. Notable people with the surname include:

- Anna Paaske (1856–1935), Norwegian opera singer and teacher
- Carl Paaske (1890–1970), Norwegian pentathlete
- Else Paaske (born 1941), Danish singer and educator
- Erik Paaske (1933–1992), Danish singer and actor
- Lars Paaske (born 1976), Danish badminton player

== See also ==
- Easter
- Cathrine Paaske Sørensen (born 1978), Danish footballer
