= Godfree =

Godfree is a surname. Notable people with the surname include:

- Douglas Godfree (1881–1929), British fencer and modern pentathlete
- Grainne Godfree, American television writer
- Guy Godfree, Canadian cinematographer
- Leslie Godfree (1885–1971), British male tennis player
- Kathleen McKane Godfree (1896–1992), British tennis and badminton player
