= Ulf Peder Olrog =

Swedish folklorist, lecturer

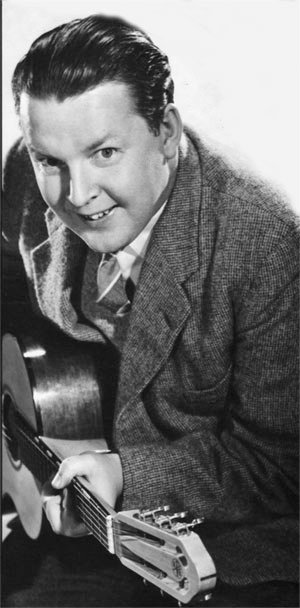
- Ulf Peder Olrog c.1950
- Born: 27 February 1919; Stockholm, Sweden
- Died: 13 February 1972 (aged 52)
- Occupations: folklorist, songwriter, composer and radio personality
- Relatives: Gustaf Lewenhaupt (father-in-law)

Ulf Peder Olrog (27 February 1919 – 13 February 1972) was a Swedish folklorist, lecturer, composer, songwriter, and radio personality.

He was born in Stockholm to Thorvald Olrog and Hervor Jeanna Amalia Andrén.

He studied at the University of Uppsala, and later (1952–1959) lectured in folkloristic at this university. He was assigned with Sveriges Radio from 1964, from 1971 as program director of the entertainment department.

Olrog became a recognized composer and lyricist of numerous songs in Swedish. His songs also appeared in several feature films in the 1950s and 60s.
