= Patrik de Laval =

Swedish modern pentathlete

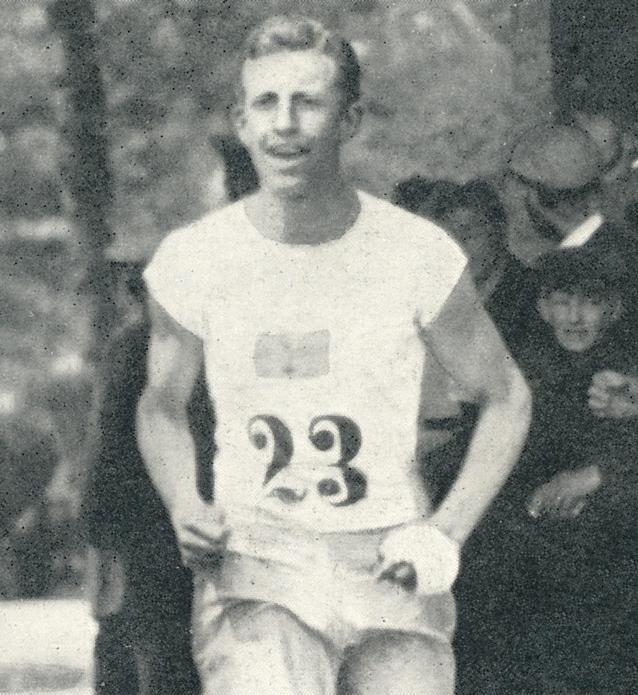

Personal information
- Born: 14 October 1886 Stockholm, Sweden
- Died: 29 October 1974 (aged 88) Stockholm, Sweden

Sport
- Sport: Shooting, modern pentathlon
- Club: Stockholms PK; A1 IF, Stockholm

Claude Patrik Gustaf de Laval (14 October 1886 – 29 October 1974) was a Swedish modern pentathlete and sport shooter who competed in the 1912 Summer Olympics. He finished 14th in the modern pentathlon and 13th in the 30 metre rapid fire pistol event. His brothers Erik and Georg also competed in shooting and pentathlon at the same Olympics.
