= Georges Brulé =

French modern pentathlete (1876–1961)

Personal information
- Born: 23 October 1876 Dreux, France
- Died: 31 October 1961 (aged 85) Rabat, Morocco

Sport
- Sport: Modern pentathlon

Georges Brulé (23 October 1876 – 31 October 1961) was a French modern pentathlete. He competed at the 1912 and 1920 Summer Olympics.
