= Carl Aejemelaeus =

Finnish modern pentathlete (1882–1935)

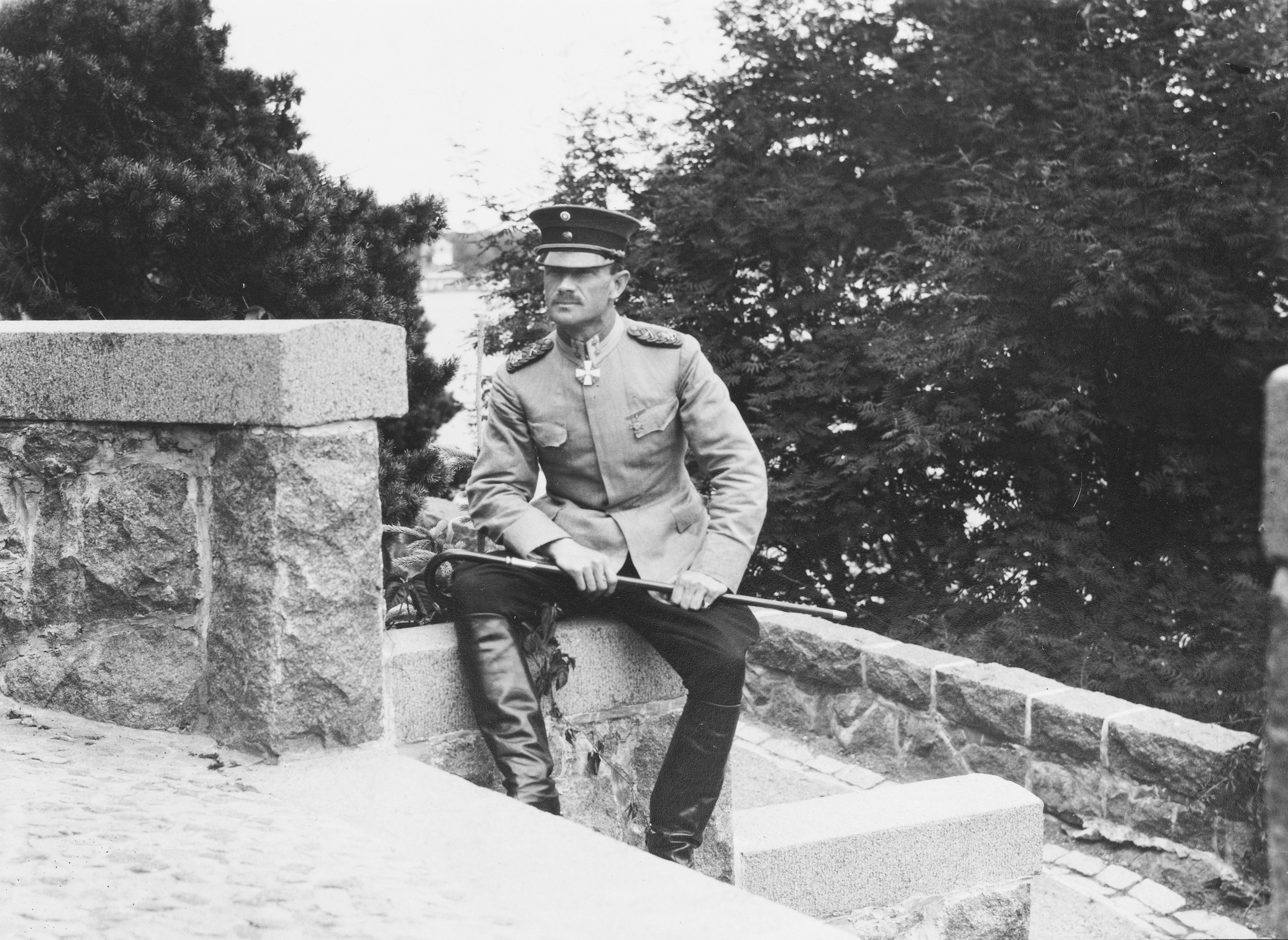

Personal information
- Full name: Carl Bror Emil Aejmelaeus-Äimä
- Nickname: Kalle
- Nationality: Finnish
- Born: 20 May 1882 Porvoo, Grand Duchy of Finland, Russian Empire
- Died: 13 July 1935 (aged 53) Kiel, Nazi Germany

Sport
- Sport: Modern pentathlon

Carl Aejemelaeus (20 May 1882 – 13 July 1935) was a Finnish colonel, modern pentathlete and fencer.

Aejemelaeus was educated in St. Petersburg at the Nicholas Cavalry College, Main Officer's Gymnastics and Fencing School and Imperial Archaeological Institute. He competed for the Russian Empire in the 1912 Olympic Games. After the establishment of Finland's independence, he served as the First Adjutant of president K. J. Ståhlberg from 1919 to 1925 and was a military attaché in London and Moscow. Aejemelaeus is a recipient of the Cross of Liberty of Estonia.

Aejemelaeus competed for Russia at the 1912 Summer Olympics in the modern pentathlon. He was a member of Finnish Olympic Committee and a co-founder of the fencing club HFM Helsinki, which is the oldest fencing club in Finland.
