= Oskar Wilkman =

Finnish modern pentathlete

Personal information
- Full name: Oskar Wilkman-Vilkama
- Born: 4 July 1880 Helsinki, Grand Duchy of Finland, Russian Empire
- Died: 28 June 1953 (aged 72) Padasjoki, Finland

Sport
- Sport: Equestrian, modern pentathlon

Oskar Wilkman (7 April 1880 – 28 June 1953) was a Finnish military officer, equestrian and modern pentathlete. He competed for Russia in the modern pentathlon at the 1912 Summer Olympics and for Finland in the equestrianism at the 1920 Summer Olympics. Wilkman fought in the 1918 Finnish Civil War on the White side. His brother was the general Karl Fredrik Wilkama.
