= Henrik Norby =

Norwegian modern pentathlete

Personal information
- Born: 18 March 1889 Oslo, Norway
- Died: 28 October 1964 (aged 75) Skedsmo, Norway

Sport
- Sport: Modern pentathlon

Henrik Norby (18 March 1889 – 28 October 1964) was a Norwegian modern pentathlete. He competed at the 1912 Summer Olympics.
