= Åke Grönhagen =

Swedish modern pentathlete

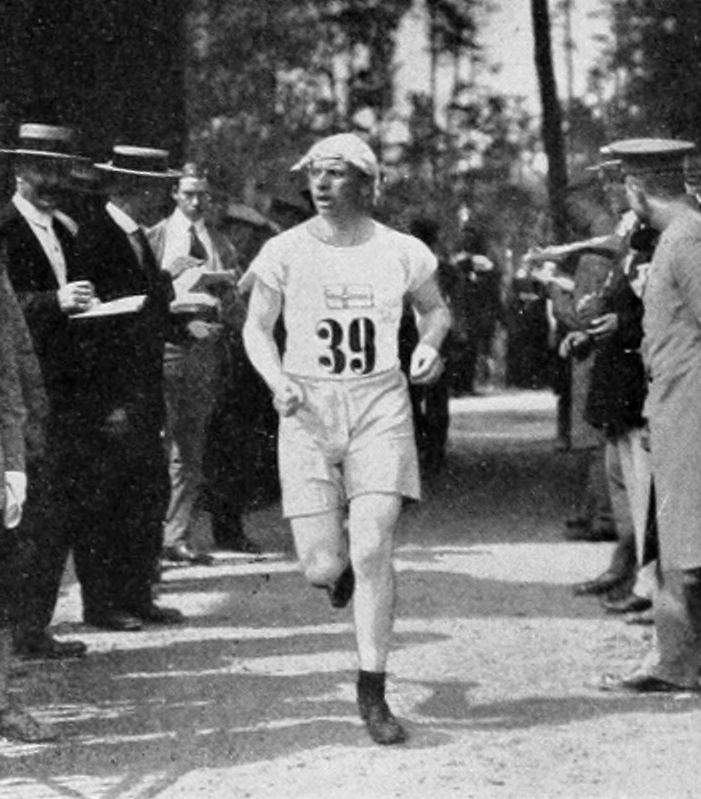
- Åke Grönhagen running the cross-country leg of the pentathlon competition at the 1912 Olympics

Personal information
- Born: 24 January 1885 Stockholm, Sweden
- Died: 25 December 1974 (aged 89) Stockholm, Sweden

Sport
- Sport: Fencing, modern pentathlon
- Club: FFF, Stockholm; IFK Stockholm

Åke Edvard Grönhagen (24 January 1885 – 25 December 1974) was a Swedish modern pentathlete and épée fencer who competed in the 1912 Summer Olympics. He finished fourth in the Olympic modern pentathlon, and was eliminated in the first round of the individual épée competition.

Grönhagen's grandson, Carl William "Bill" Gronhagen, was an air traffic controller at Los Angeles International Airport.
