= Charles Lewenhaupt (equestrian) =

Swedish equestrian

Charles Auguste Sixtensson Lewenhaupt (25 February 1881 – 23 April 1936) was a Swedish horse rider who competed in the 1912 Summer Olympics. He was born in Örebro and died in Stockholm.

He was the brother of Gustaf Lewenhaupt. The two both competed in the individual jumping event in the 1912 Olympics, both tying for 9th place along with two other men. Charles was not a member of the Swedish team for the team event in which Gustaf won a gold medal.

Charles was a member of the sports club of the 1st Artillery regiment of the Swedish army.
