= Gotland sports at the 1912 Summer Olympics =

Gotland sports, traditional sports from the Swedish island of Gotland, were featured in the 1912 Summer Olympics as an unofficial demonstration sport. The three disciplines showcased were pärk, varpa and stångstörtning.
