= Georg de Laval =

Swedish sport shooter and modern pentathlete

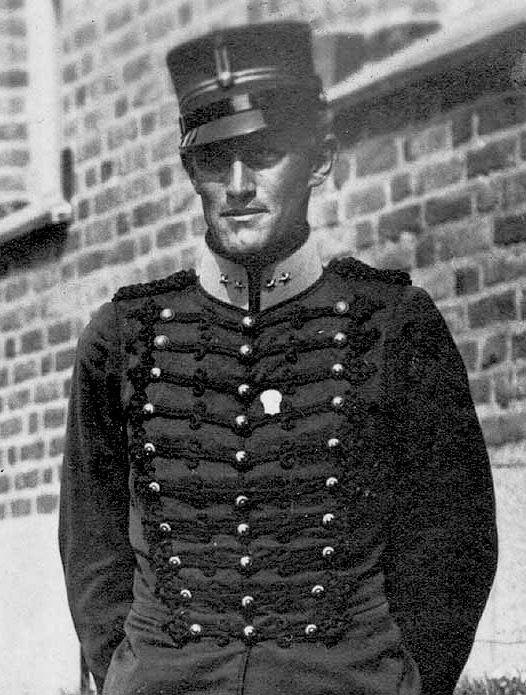
- Georg de Laval at the 1912 Olympics

Personal information
- Born: 16 April 1883 Stockholm, Sweden
- Died: 10 March 1970 (aged 86) Stockholm, Sweden

Sport
- Sport: Shooting, modern pentathlon
- Club: Stockholms PK; A1 IF, Stockholm
Medal record
Representing Sweden
Olympic Games
Silver medal – second place	1912 Stockholm	50 m team military pistol
Bronze medal – third place	1912 Stockholm	Modern pentathlon

Patrik Georg Fabian de Laval (16 April 1883 – 10 March 1970) was a Swedish sport shooter and modern pentathlete who competed in the 1912 Summer Olympics. He was part of the Swedish team that won the silver medal in the 50 m team military pistol event. Individually, he won a bronze medal in the first-contested modern pentathlon.

De Laval was born of a Swedish noble family. In 1913, he married baroness Ebba Fleetwood, the eldest daughter of baron Carl Fleetwood, 10th baron of Jälunda, and his first wife countess Hedvig, née Lewenhaupt. His brothers Patrik and Erik were also Olympic pentathletes.

== See also ==
- Dual sport and multi-sport Olympians
