= Gösta Lilliehöök (1884–1974) =

Swedish modern pentathlete

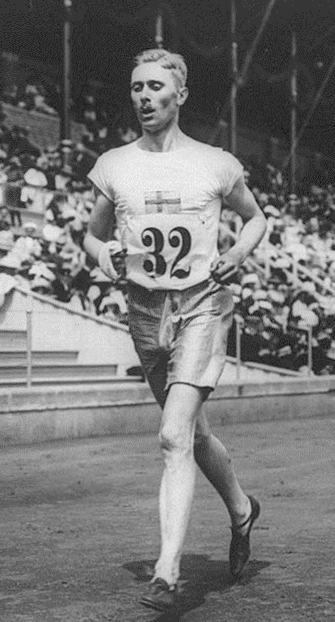
- Gösta Lilliehöök at the 1912 Olympics in Stockholm, Sweden

Personal information
- Nationality: Swedish
- Born: 25 May 1884 Stockholm, Sweden
- Died: 18 November 1974 (aged 90) Stockholm, Sweden

Sport
- Country: Sweden
- Sport: Modern pentathlon
- Club: A1 IF, Stockholm
Medal record
Representing Sweden
Olympic Games
Gold medal – first place	1912 Stockholm	Modern pentathlon

Gustaf Malcolm "Gösta" Lilliehöök (Swedish pronunciation: [ˈɡɵ̂sːtav ˈmâlːkɔlm ˈjœ̂sːta ˈlɪ̂lːjɛˌhøːk]; 25 May 1884 – 18 November 1974) was a Swedish officer and modern pentathlete. He won a gold medal in the first contested modern pentathlon at the Olympic Games in 1912.

== Career ==
Lilliehöök was born on 25 May 1884 in Stockholm, Sweden, the son of First Marshal of the Court Carl Malcolm Lilliehöök and his wife Anna Ekelund. He was commissioned as an officer in Svea Artillery Regiment in 1906 with the rank of underlöjtnant. Lilliehöök was promoted to lieutenant in 1910 and to captain in 1918, after which he was placed in the reserve.

He won a gold medal in the first contested modern pentathlon at the Olympic Games in 1912. He later became one of the first five employees of the national Swedish radio.

== Personal life ==
In 1922, Lilliehöök married Anna de Fine Blauw (born 1891), the daughter of the artist Dick Blauw and Marie de Fine Beyer.
