= Gunnar von Hohenthal =

Finnish modern pentathlete (1880–1966)

Personal information
- Full name: Veli Gunnar Bogislaus von Hohenthal
- Nationality: Finnish
- Born: 15 November 1880 Raippaluoto, Finland, Russian Empire
- Died: 23 June 1966 (aged 85) Stockholm, Sweden

Sport
- Sport: Modern pentathlon

Gunnar von Hohenthal (15 November 1880 – 23 June 1966) was a Finnish modern pentathlete. He competed for Russia at the 1912 Summer Olympics. He was also Lieutenant Colonel who served in both the Finnish Army and Imperial Russian Army. Hohenthal, who was of Swedish descent through his mother, moved to Sweden in 1944 and received Swedish citizenship in 1952.
