= Carl Pauen =

German modern pentathlete

Personal information
- Born: 7 April 1859 Mönchengladbach, Kingdom of Prussia
- Died: 7 June 1935 (aged 76) Bad Godesberg, Germany

Sport
- Sport: Modern pentathlon

Carl Pauen (7 April 1859 – 7 June 1935) was a German modern pentathlete. He competed at the 1912 Summer Olympics.
