= Douglas Godfree =

British fencer and modern pentathlete

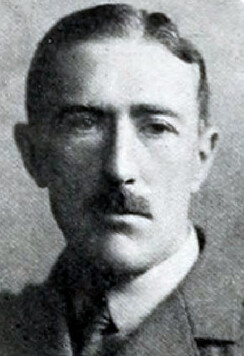
- Godfree c. 1921

Personal information
- Full name: Douglas William Godfree
- Born: 16 October 1881 Bedford Park, London, England
- Died: 5 August 1929 (aged 47) Chelsea, London, England

Sport
- Sport: Fencing, modern pentathlon

Douglas William Godfree MC (16 October 1881 – 5 August 1929) was a British Army officer who competed in fencing and modern pentathlon at the Olympic Games as well as playing a number of other sports. He was a "talented" sportsman who has been described as "nationally renowned" as a competitor at two Olympic Games. He served in the military until his death and was decorated during World War I.

== Early life and military service ==
Godfree was born at Bedford Park in London in 1881. He attended Royal Military College, Sandhurst and was commissioned as a second lieutenant in the 21st Lancers in May 1901 when the regiment was serving in Ireland. He was promoted to lieutenant in July 1907 and captain in April 1912, before serving during World War I. The regiment was primarily stationed in India during the war, although Godfree saw active service when he took command of a squadron of 13th Hussars in Mespotamia in early 1918, commanding it through the final stages of the Mesopotamian campaign. He was awarded the Military Cross and mentioned in dispatches during his service in Mesopotamia. He acted as the regiment's adjutant on a number of occasions.

In 1921 Godfree married Kathleen Moorhouse (née Denison), the widow of an officer in the Argyll and Sutherland Highlanders who had previously served alongside Godfree in 21st Lancers. (Note: Samuel Moorhouse died in December 1918 on the Isle of Wight during the 1918 flu epidemic, having contracted the disease whilst serving with the Argyll and Sutherland Highlanders at the front.) The regiment was in the process of being disbanded, and he served for a short period in the Welsh Guards before being chosen to command the 21st Lancer squadron of the newly formed 17th/21st Lancers in 1922. In 1927, he was promoted to major, becoming the 17/21st Lancer's second in command.

== Sporting life ==
Godfree was described as "a very keen sportsman". He represented the regiment in polo and racquets, and also played lawn tennis―at which he was described as "talented"―winning a number of tournaments. He captained the 21st Lancers polo team, which won the 1908 subaltern's tournament―hitting the winning goal in extra time―and in 1911 he published Some Notes on Polo, an instructional text described as "a thoughtful work with plenty of practical and sound advice on the game". He competed regularly in the Royal Naval and Military Tournament, winning the Heads and Posts competition in 1907, 1909 and 1910. In 1910 he also won the officers Sabre v Sabre and Sword v Sword fencing competitions and the following year was victorious in the tent pegging competition.

He competed in the individual sabre competition at the 1908 Summer Olympics in London, finishing last in pool six and not winning a match, and finished joint fourth in pool eight in the same competition at the 1912 Summer Olympics in Stockholm. He also competed in the modern pentathlon at Stockholm, the first time the sport had been part of the Olympics. He finished tenth in the competition―a performance which an obituary described as "no mean feat for a cavalry officer"―and was the highest finishing British competitor, another of whom, Hugh Durant, was also a cavalry officer, serving in the 9th Lancers.

== Death ==
By 1929 the 17th/21st Lancers were based at Cavalry Barracks, Hounslow in London, with Godfree still second in command when he fell ill. He died in a nursing home at Chelsea in London in early August 1929 after suffering from leukaemia. He was 47 and had been on duty the week before. He was buried at Aldershot Military Cemetery. Obituaries described him as having "infinite charm, courtesy, tact and [a] kindly manner" as well as "never-failing sympathy and [a] willingness always to help".
