= Nils Häggström =

Swedish modern pentathlete

Personal information
- Born: 4 October 1885 Stockholm, Sweden
- Died: 15 March 1974 (aged 88) Strängnäs, Sweden

Sport
- Sport: Modern pentathlon

Nils Häggström (4 October 1885 – 15 March 1974) was a Swedish modern pentathlete. He competed at the 1912 Summer Olympics.
