= Stångstörtning =

Traditional Swedish sport

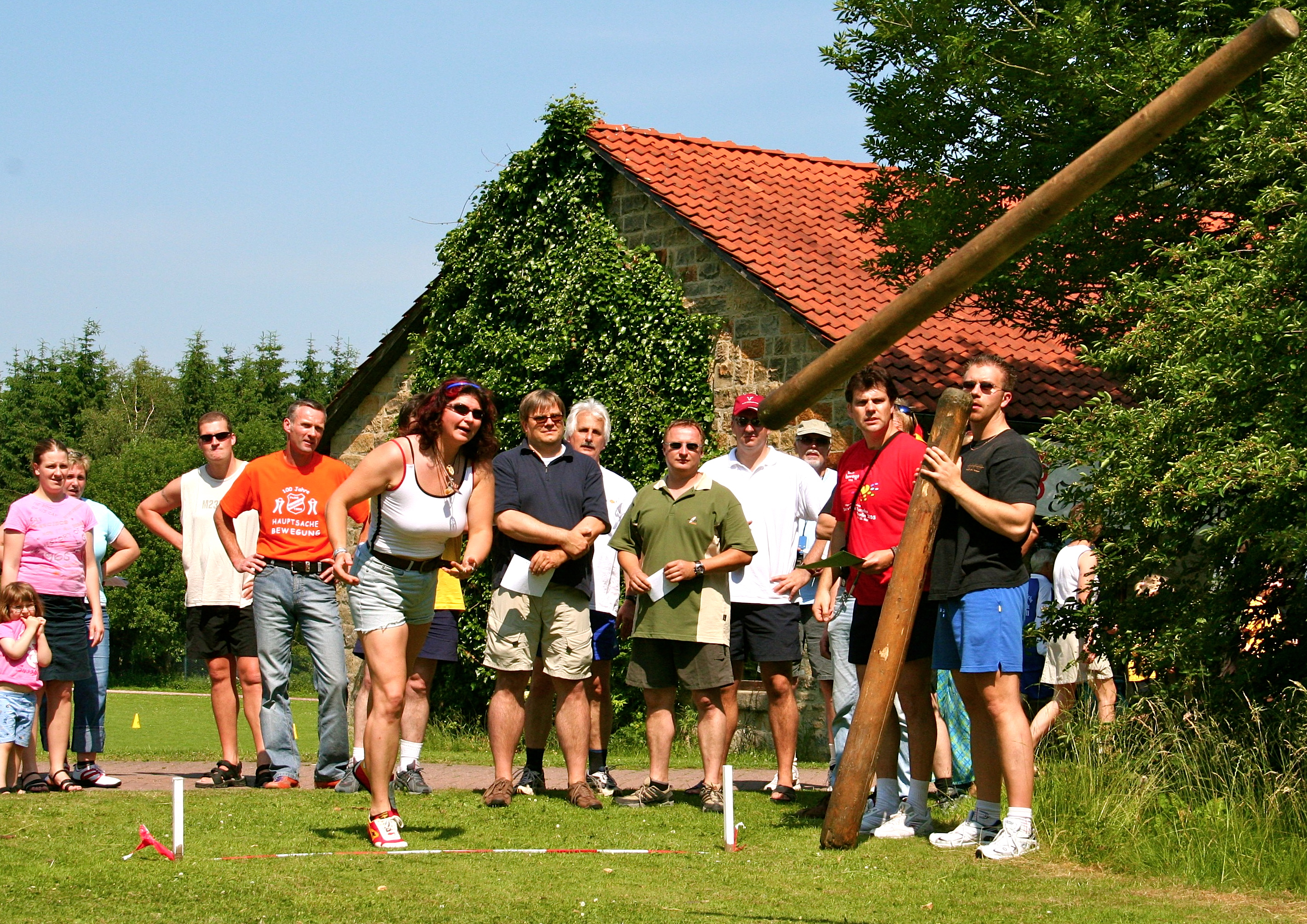
A 2006 stångstörtning competition

Stångstörtning is a Swedish sport originating from Gotland. It is similar to the Scottish caber toss, and involves tossing a log as far as possible. The log is 4.2–4.5 m long, weighs 26–27 kg, has a diameter of 13 cm at the thick end and 6–7 cm at the thin end, and is made of Norway spruce.

It is contested at the Stånga Games, and was an unofficial demonstration event at the 1912 Summer Olympics along with other Gotland sports.

The world record is 9.75 meters, set by Erik Larsson in 2015.

== See also ==
- Caber toss
