= Gösta Åsbrink =

Swedish gymnast and modern pentathlete

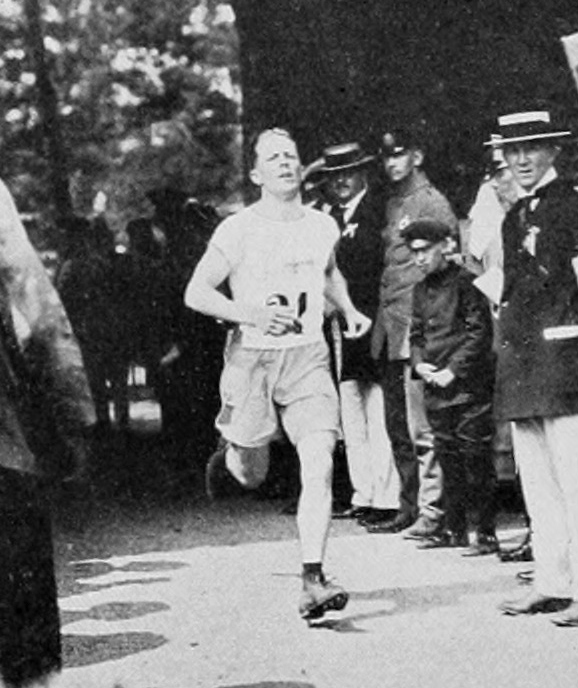
- Åsbrink at the 1912 Summer Olympics

Personal information
- Full name: Karl Gösta Åsbrink
- Nationality: Swedish
- Born: 18 November 1881 Lovö, United Kingdoms of Sweden and Norway
- Died: 19 April 1966 (aged 84) Stockholm, Sweden

Sport
- Country: Sweden
- Sport: Gymnastics, modern pentathlon
- Club: Stockholms Gymnastikförening; Infanteri 10 Idrottsförening

Gymnastics career
- Discipline: Men's artistic gymnastics
- Country represented: Sweden
Medal record

Representing Sweden
Men's artistic gymnastics
Olympic Games
Gold medal – first place	1908 London	Team
Men's modern pentathlon
Olympic Games
Silver medal – second place	1912 Stockholm	Modern pentathlon

Karl Gösta Åsbrink (18 November 1881 – 19 April 1966) was a Swedish gymnast and modern pentathlete who won a gold medal in the 1908 Summer Olympics and a silver medal in the 1912 Summer Olympics.

Åsbrink's 1908 gold medal was won in London for a team event, as the Swedish men's gymnastics team came in first. Four years later, competing before a home audience in 1912 Stockholm, he won an individual silver medal in the first contested Modern pentathlon of the Olympic Games. Åsbrink was a lieutenant of the Swedish Army at the time and was later promoted to major.
