= Arno Almqvist =

Finnish modern pentathlete

Personal information
- Born: 23 September 1881 Pori, Grand Duchy of Finland, Russian Empire
- Died: 5 March 1940 (aged 58) Mikkeli, Finland

Sport
- Sport: Modern pentathlon

Arno Axel Almqvist (23 September 1881 – 5 March 1940) was a Finnish colonel and modern pentathlete.

== Military career ==
Almqvist started his military career at Hamina Cadet School in Finland and then joined the Mikhailovskaya Artillery Military Academy in St. Petersburg. During the First World War he served as a captain at the Kronstadt naval fortress. Almqvist was later arrested by the Bolsheviks and spent five months in the dungeons of Kronstadt.

At the Finnish Civil War Almqvist fought for the White Guards as a commander of an artillery battery. In May 1918, Almqvist was named as the commander of Suomenlinna coastal artillery regiment. From September 1923 to November 1924 he was the commander of Finnish Coastal Artillery. After his resignation Almqvist worked as a prison warden.

Arno Almqvist died on Mikkeli bombings in March 1940. He was working for the Finnish army as a voluntary civilian.

== Sports career ==
Almqvist competed for the Russian Empire (of which Finland was then part) in the modern pentathlon at the 1912 Summer Olympics and finished 20th place.
