= Ralph Clilverd =

British modern pentathlete

Personal information
- Full name: Ralph Egerton Clilverd
- Born: 30 July 1887 Brixton, London, England
- Died: 7 June 1970 (aged 82) Bath, Somerset, England

Sport
- Sport: Modern pentathlon

Ralph Egerton Clilverd MC (30 July 1887 – 7 June 1970) was a British modern pentathlete. He competed at the 1912 Summer Olympics at the age of 24, where he placed 1st in swimming with a time of 4:58.4 and 11th overall.

He was awarded an MC in 1917 serving in the Royal Field Artillery.
