= Karl Mannström =

Swedish modern pentathlete

Personal information
- Full name: Bror Karl Anton Mannström
- Born: 26 October 1884 Sundsvall, Sweden
- Died: 19 July 1916 (aged 31) Tofteryd, Sweden

Sport
- Sport: Modern pentathlon

Karl Mannström (26 October 1884 – 19 July 1916) was a Swedish modern pentathlete. He competed at the 1912 Summer Olympics.

Mannström became an officer at the Fortification in 1909 and was appointed lieutenant in 1912. He was commanded to the flight school at Malmslätt in 1915 to undergo his flight training. He was awarded after the certificate tests on June 22, 1915, Swedish aviator diploma no. 28 issued by S.A.S. (Swedish Aeronautical Society). In 1916, Mannström set a Scandinavian altitude record with passengers when he reached an altitude of 4,000 meters. He died in a plane crash just outside Skillingaryd in a Morane-Saulnier aircraft licensed by Thulin's workshops.
