= Jean de Mas Latrie =

Fencer, modern pentathlete

Personal information
- Born: 23 November 1879 Paris, France
- Died: 5 September 1914 (aged 34) Rebais, France

Sport
- Sport: Fencing, modern pentathlon

Jean de Mas Latrie (23 November 1879 – 5 September 1914) was a French fencer and modern pentathlete. He competed in the individual sabre event at the 1908 Summer Olympics and the modern pentathlon at the 1912 Summer Olympics where he was undefeated in fencing until losing to future U.S. general George S. Patton who was also competing in these events, Patton was the only man Jean lost to in said event. He was killed in action during World War I.

== See also ==
- List of Olympians killed in World War I
