= Carl Paaske =

Norwegian modern pentathlete (1890–1970)

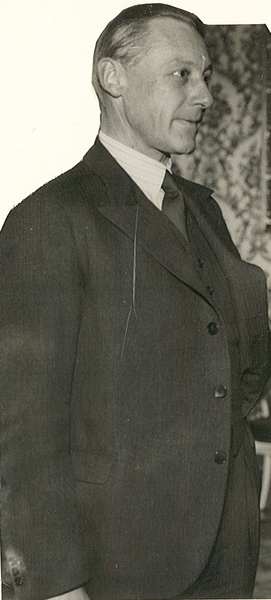
- Carl Paaske, c. 1938

Personal information
- Born: 29 July 1890 Oslo, Norway
- Died: 7 June 1970 (aged 79) Oslo, Norway

Sport
- Sport: Modern pentathlon

Carl Paaske (29 July 1890 – 7 June 1970) was a Norwegian modern pentathlete. He competed at the 1912 Summer Olympics.
