= Edmond Bernhardt =

Austrian sportsman (1885–1976)

Personal information
- Born: 20 April 1885 Vienna, Austria
- Died: 23 May 1976 (aged 91) Marylebone, London, England

Sport
- Sport: Swimming, modern pentathlon, sports shooting

Edmond Bernhardt (20 April 1885 – 23 May 1976) was an Austrian freestyle swimmer, sports shooter and modern pentathlete. He competed in two swimming events at the 1906 Intercalated Games. Six years later, he competed in the modern pentathlon and shooting at the 1912 Summer Olympics.
