= Sidney Stranne =

Swedish modern pentathlete and fencer

Personal information
- Born: 8 February 1886 Dragsmark, Uddevalla Municipality, Sweden
- Died: 3 August 1957 (aged 71) Stockholm, Sweden

Sport
- Sport: Modern pentathlon, Fencing

Sidney Stranne (8 February 1886 – 3 August 1957) was a Swedish modern pentathlete and épée fencer. He competed in the modern pentathlon at the 1912 Summer Olympics and in fencing at the 1928 Summer Olympics.

Stranne was born in Dragsmark.
