= Erik de Laval =

Swedish modern pentathlete

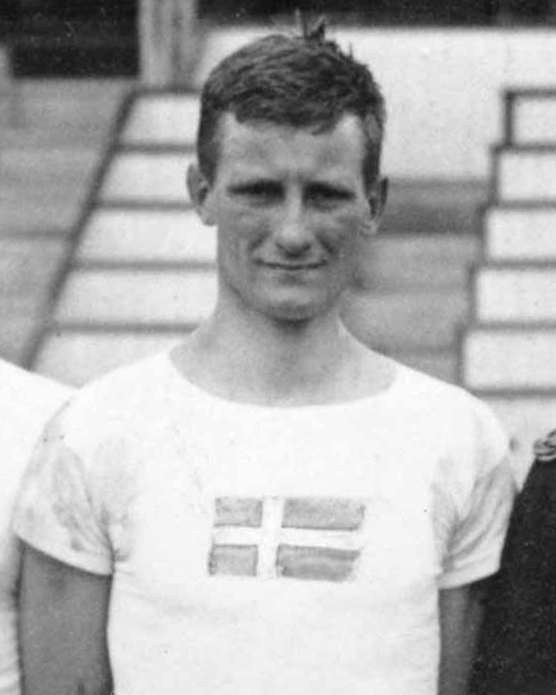
- Erik de Laval at the 1920 Olympics

Personal information
- Born: Erik Patrik Honoré de Laval; 28 April 1888 Stockholm, Sweden
- Died: 9 November 1973 (aged 85) Stockholm, Sweden

Sport
- Sport: Modern pentathlon
- Club: A1 IF, Stockholm
Medal record
Representing Sweden
Olympic Games
Silver medal – second place	1920 Antwerp	Individual

Erik Patrik Honoré de Laval (28 April 1888 – 9 November 1973) was a Swedish Army officer and modern pentathlete who won a silver medal at the 1920 Summer Olympics.

== Early life ==
De Laval was born on 28 April 1888 in Stockholm, Sweden, the son of Patrik de Laval and his wife Elisabeth Lewin.

== Career ==
De Laval was commissioned as an officer in 1909 and was assigned to Svea Artillery Regiment (A 1) in Stockholm as a underlöjtnant. He competed at the 1912 Stockholm Olympics together with his elder brothers Georg and Patrik, who were also military officers. Erik was disqualified in the cross-country riding, while Georg won the bronze medal. As a modern pentathlete he won a silver medal at the 1920 Summer Olympics.

He became captain of the General Staff in 1923 and was promoted to major in 1931 and to lieutenant colonel in 1935. De Laval served as a military attaché at the Swedish Legation in Warsaw from 1933 to 1937, and he was then assigned to Norrland Artillery Regiment (A 4) in Östersund the same year. He served again as a military attaché in Warsaw in 1939, was promoted to colonel in 1941, and was then head of the B Department at the Swedish Legation in Berlin from 1941 to 1942. De Laval then served as military attaché at the Swedish Embassy in Washington, D.C. from 1942 to 1946.

He later wrote books about the modern history of Poland and its leader Józef Piłsudski. In 1948 he served in Damascus as a member of the UN mission mediating the Arab-Israeli conflict.

== Personal life ==
In 1914, de Laval married Elisabeth Roos (born 1891), the daughter of county governor Gustaf Roos and Elisabeth Hedberg. The later part of his life he lived in Alhaurin de la Torre, Spain. De Laval's residence later became Lidingö, Sweden, where he died.

== Dates of rank ==
- 1909 – Underlöjtnant
- 19?? – Lieutenant
- 1923 – Captain
- 1931 – Major
- 1935 – Lieutenant colonel
- 1941 – Colonel

== Honours ==
- Member of the Royal Swedish Academy of War Sciences (1958)
