= Gustaf Lewenhaupt =

Swedish count and equestrian

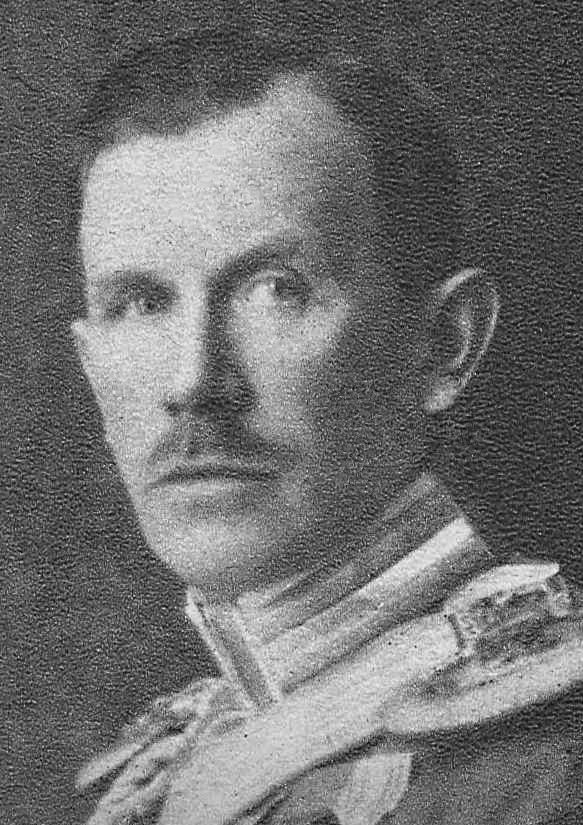
- Count Gustaf Lewenhaupt in 1942
- Born: Carl Gustaf Sixtensson Lewenhaupt; 20 August 1879; Örebro, Sweden
- Died: 7 August 1962 (aged 82); Stockholm, Sweden
- Military career
- Allegiance: Sweden
- Branch: Swedish Army
- Service years: 1902–1932
- Rank: Major
- Unit: Life Guards of Horse
- Other work: Cabinet chamberlain

Carl Gustaf Sixtensson Lewenhaupt (20 August 1879 – 7 August 1962) was a Swedish Count, officer, courtier, horse rider and modern pentathlete who competed in the 1912 Summer Olympics.

In the equestrian jumping event he finished ninth individually (tied with his brother Charles Lewenhaupt) and won the gold medal with the Swedish team. He placed seventeenth in the modern pentathlon competition.

== See also ==
- Dual sport and multi-sport Olympians
