= 1912 Summer Olympics =

Multi-sport event in Stockholm, Sweden

Games of the V Olympiad
- Poster for the 1912 Summer Olympics, designed by Olle Hjortzberg
- Location: Stockholm, Sweden
- Nations: 28
- Athletes: 2,406 (2,359 men, 47 women)
- Events: 102 in 14 sports (18 disciplines)
- Opening: 6 July 1912
- Closing: 22 July 1912
- Opened by: King Gustaf V
- Stadium: Stockholms Olympiastadion

The 1912 Summer Olympics (Swedish: Olympiska sommarspelen 1912), officially known as the Games of the V Olympiad (Swedish: Den V olympiadens spel) and commonly known as Stockholm 1912, were an international multi-sport event held in Stockholm, Sweden, between 6 July and 22 July 1912. The opening ceremony was held on 6 July. They were the only Summer Olympics to be held in the 1910s as the 1916 Summer Olympics in Berlin were cancelled due to World War I.

Twenty-eight nations and 2,408 competitors, including 48 women, competed in 102 events in 14 sports. With the exception of tennis (starting on 5 May) and football and shooting (both starting on 29 June), the games were held within a month with an official opening on 6 July. It was the last Olympics to issue solid gold medals and, with Japan's debut, the first time an official team from an Asian nation participated. Stockholm was the only bid for the games, and was selected in 1909.

The games were the first to have art competitions, women's diving, women's swimming, and the first to feature both the decathlon and the new pentathlon, both won by the American Jim Thorpe. Electric timing was introduced in athletics, while the host country disallowed boxing. Figure skating was rejected by the organizers because they wanted to promote the Nordic Games. The United States won the most gold medals (26), while hosts Sweden won the most medals overall (65). These were the final Olympic Games for eight years due to the disruption of the First World War. The next Olympic Games were held in 1920 in Antwerp.

== Host selection ==
Following the 1908 Summer Olympics in London, authorities in Sweden immediately sought to ensure that the next games would be held there. There were two Swedish members of the International Olympic Committee (IOC) at the time, Viktor Balck and Clarence von Rosen. The pair proposed the idea to the Swedish governing bodies of athletics and gymnastics in order to ensure that they backed any potential bid. Support was given by the national associations on 18 April 1909 for a bid to host the Olympics in Stockholm on the basis that suitable financial arrangements could be made. King Gustaf V was petitioned on 6 May 1909 following the publication of preliminary plans for the Stockholm bid that the expected cost of hosting the Games would be 415,000 kronor (£23,050 or $115,250). The Government accepted the petition on behalf of the King and supported the bid.

On 28 May, at the meeting of the IOC in Berlin, the Swedish representatives declared that they had full financial support for hosting the next Games in Stockholm. A deal was made with the German IOC representative on the basis that Berlin would host the 1916 Summer Olympics. Pierre de Coubertin spoke at the meeting about his concerns that Sweden should ensure that the Games take place, as he did not want a repeat of the problems with Great Britain hosting the 1908 Games. He also expressed a desire that "the Games must be kept more purely athletic; they must be more dignified, more discreet; more in accordance with classic and artistic requirements; more intimate, and, above all, less expensive." The Games were duly awarded to Sweden to host in Stockholm as the only nominated host city for the 1912 Summer Olympics.

== Organization ==
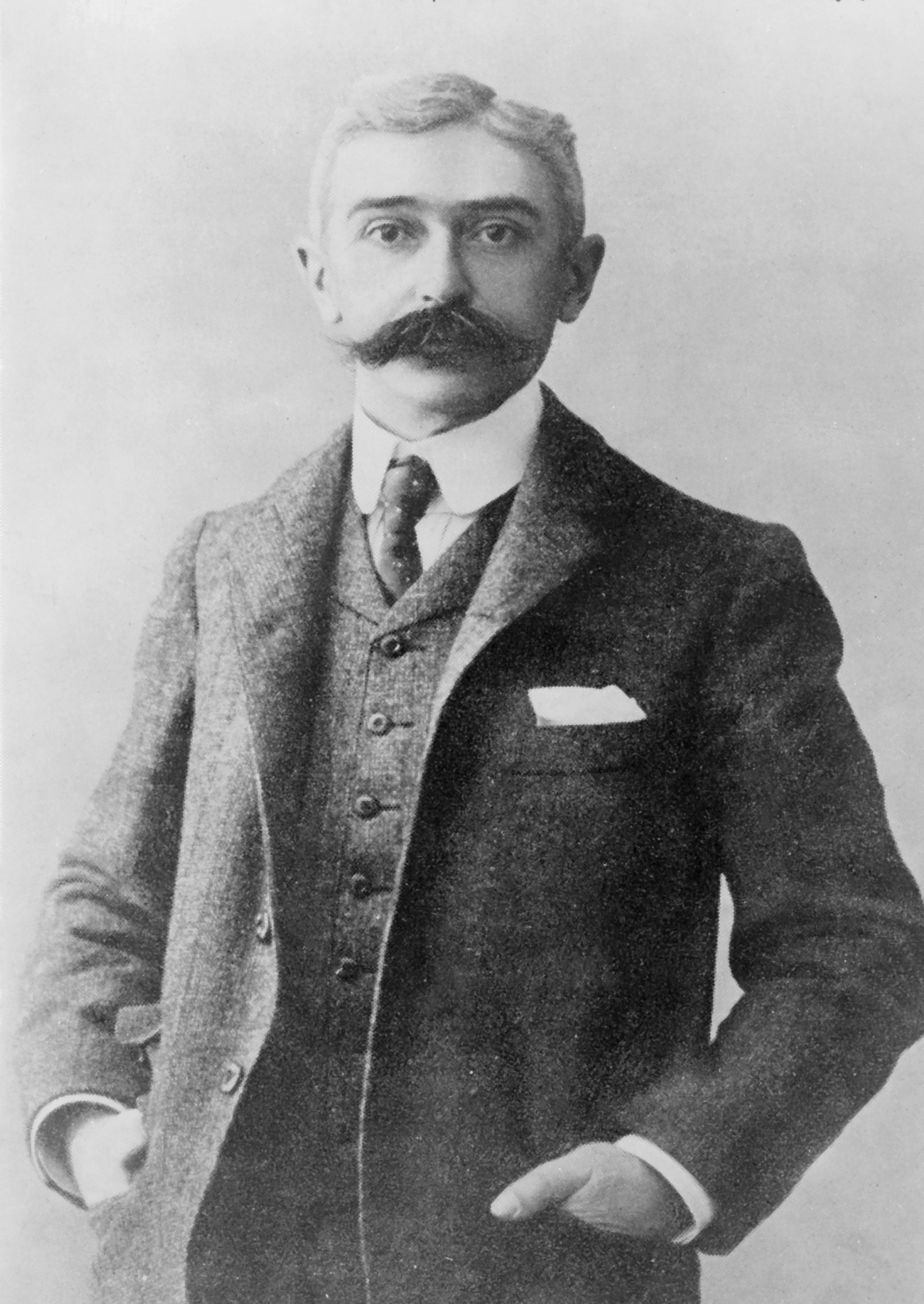
Coubertin wanted the 1912 Games to be "more dignified" than those of 1908

The news that Stockholm was to host the 1912 Olympics was received with enthusiasm by the Swedish public. The organizing committee took de Coubertin's words to heart, and aimed to achieve an Olympic Games which removed those elements which detracted from earlier Games. The committee was elected in the autumn of 1909, with Balck voted as the President of the committee, and Crown Prince Gustaf Adolf selected as Honorary President. The committee's first meeting took place on 7 October, and on 11 October they delegated the arrangements for the individual branches of sports to the relevant governing bodies in Sweden. There were four exceptions to this, with the game shooting, modern pentathlon and mountain ascents retained by the Olympic committee, and the horse riding competitions being organized by Prince Carl, Duke of Västergötland, who was the inspector of the Swedish cavalry. Altogether there were 187 members of these committees.

The official invitation to compete in the Games was issued on 18 November 1910 to 27 countries, either directly or through their representative on the IOC. A further 15 countries were to have been invited, but as they had no IOC representatives, the Swedish authorities were unsure how to proceed. Once the organizing committee for the Games received confirmation of the athletic associations in each of the 15 countries, they too were sent invitations. Some 61,800 entry forms were printed for the use of the various nations.

Free transport was arranged for the invited nations' equipment, and a discount of 50 percent was arranged for competitors and delegates on the state run railway. A daily newspaper which only covered the Olympics was arranged to be published during the Games, in both English and Swedish. Further arrangements were made for the general arrival of visitors in order to entertain them whilst they were not at the Games; a pleasure garden was opened north of the Olympic Stadium, and a series of indoor tennis courts were converted into a restaurant.

== Venues ==
Map of the Stockholm region with Olympic venues marked.

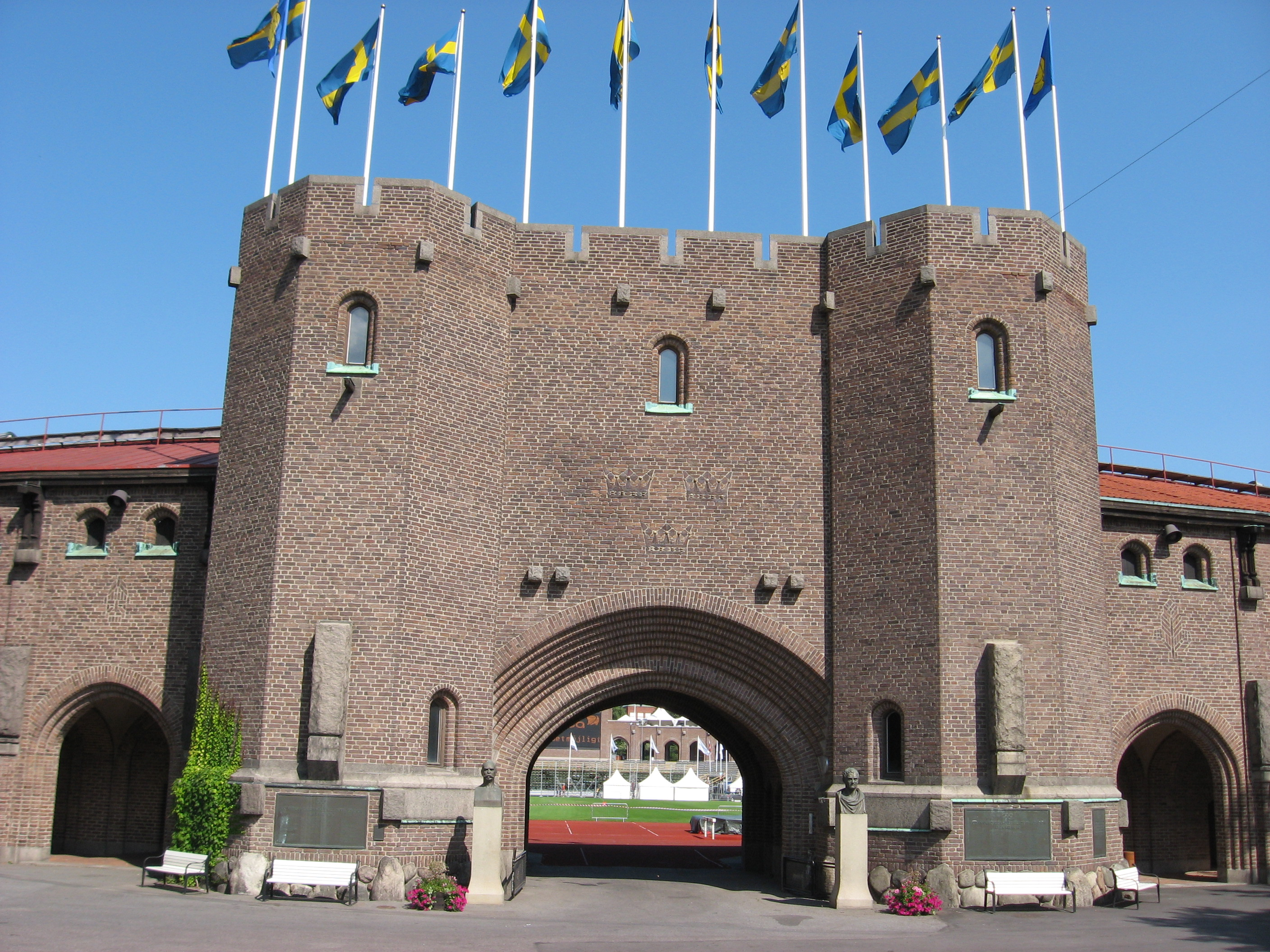
The front gate of the Stockholm Olympic Stadium, which was built for the 1912 Games

Twelve sports venues were used in the 1912 Summer Olympics. This marked the first time that more than one venue would be used for the football tournament, which has been the case ever since. Stockholm Olympic Stadium served as one of the equestrian venues for the 1956 Summer Olympics. Råsunda Stadium served as a venue for the 1958 FIFA World Cup and the 1995 FIFA Women's World Cup. In the initial bid document it was identified that a new stadium would be needed, initially envisaged as being located in the Östermalm Athletic Grounds. In order to save funds, it was expected that only one of the stadium's stands would be permanent, with the other three made of wood and dismantled following the Games. The cost of that stadium was estimated at 235,000 Kronor. Arrangements were made with the individual national committees to provide the use of Östermalm Athletic Grounds and Traneberg.

The cycling road race was held around Mälaren, the third largest lake in Sweden. The water events, including the swimming and the rowing, were held at Djurgårdsbrunnsviken, where a stadium was built. Kaknäs was already used as a shooting range, but alterations were needed to accommodate shooting events. Although it was not used as the Olympic stadium as originally intended, Östermalm hosted the lawn tennis and fencing competitions after a tennis pavilion was moved there from another location.

Five other locations were considered in addition to the Östermalm Athletic Grounds to locate the Olympic Stadium. The Stockholm Olympic Stadium was built on the site of the former Stockholm Athletic Grounds in order to retain the other locations for other uses during the Games. By placing it to the north of the city, the Olympic Stadium was within the immediate vicinity of other pre-existing sporting venues. Initial funding was given to the sum of 400,000 Kr for a timber stadium but Torben Grut, the architect, also drew up alternative plans for a stone stadium. Following discussions with the Swedish Central Association for the Application of Athletics, it was decided that the stone version should be built, and further funds were made available through a national lottery once guarantees were made that no further funding was to be asked for in order to build the stadium. However it was found that the original estimate for the stone stadium would still be too expensive, and the plans were once more modified in order to simplify the design and reduce costs. An agreement was entered into with a contractor on 2 November 1910 that it would be transferred complete by 25 May 1912.

Venue	Sports	Capacity	Ref.
Barkarby	Modern pentathlon (riding)	Not listed.	
Djurgårdsbrunnsviken	Diving, Modern pentathlon (swimming), Rowing, Swimming, Water polo	Not listed.	
Fältrittklubben	Equestrian (eventing endurance)	Not listed.	
Kaknäs	Modern pentathlon (shooting)	Not listed.	
Liljeholmen	Cycling, Equestrian	Not listed.	
Lindarängen	Equestrian (eventing steeplechase)	Not listed.	
Mälaren	Cycling	Not listed.	
Nynäshamn	Sailing	Not listed.	
Östermalm Athletic Grounds	Equestrian, Fencing, Modern pentathlon (fencing), Tennis	Not listed.	
Råsunda IP	Football, Shooting	Not listed.	
Stockholm Olympic Stadium	Athletics, Equestrian, Football (final), Gymnastics, Modern pentathlon (running), Tug of war, Wrestling	33,000	
Tranebergs Idrottsplats	Football	Not listed.	

== Opening ceremony ==
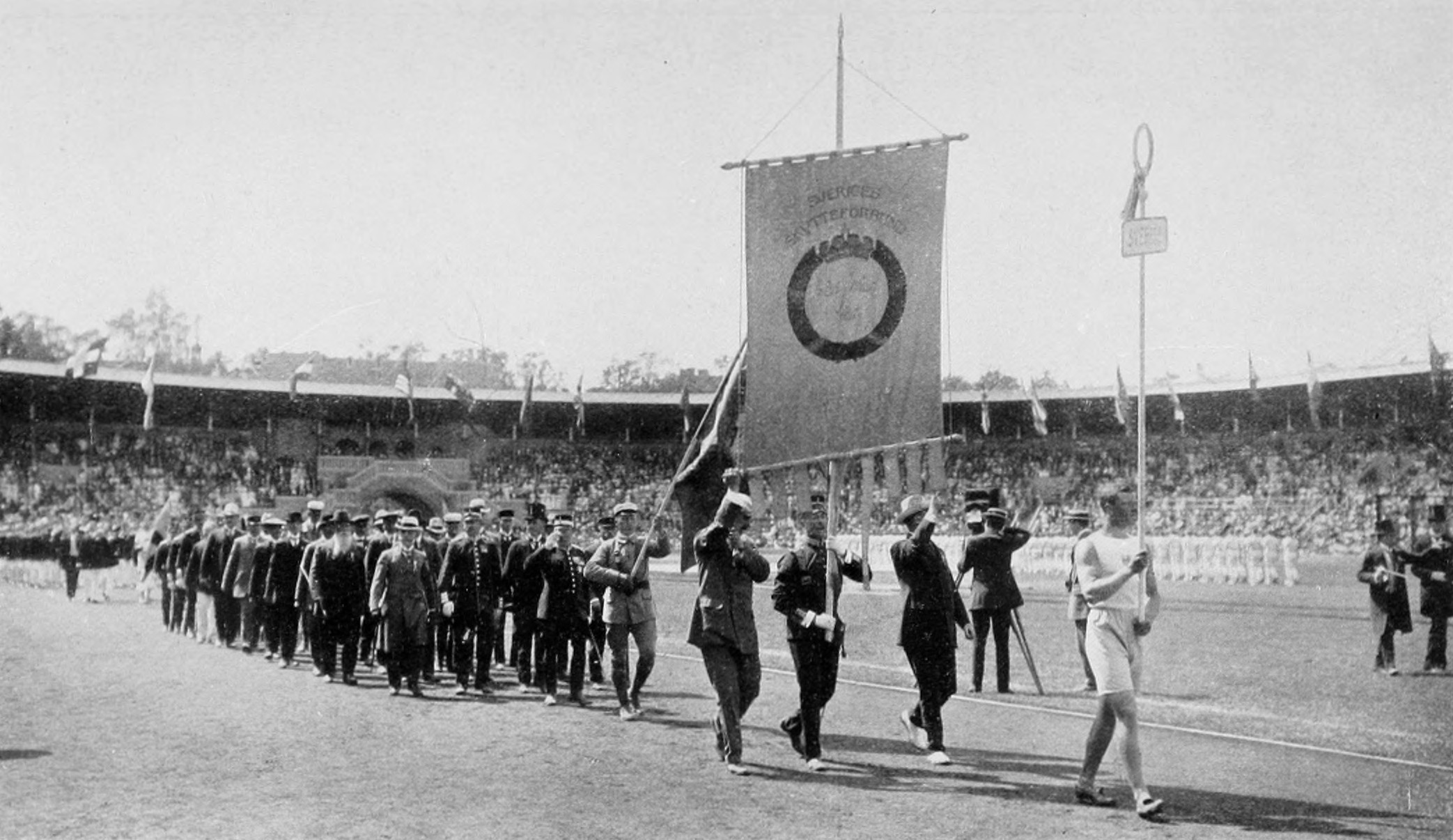
The Swedish team parading in the stadium during the opening ceremony

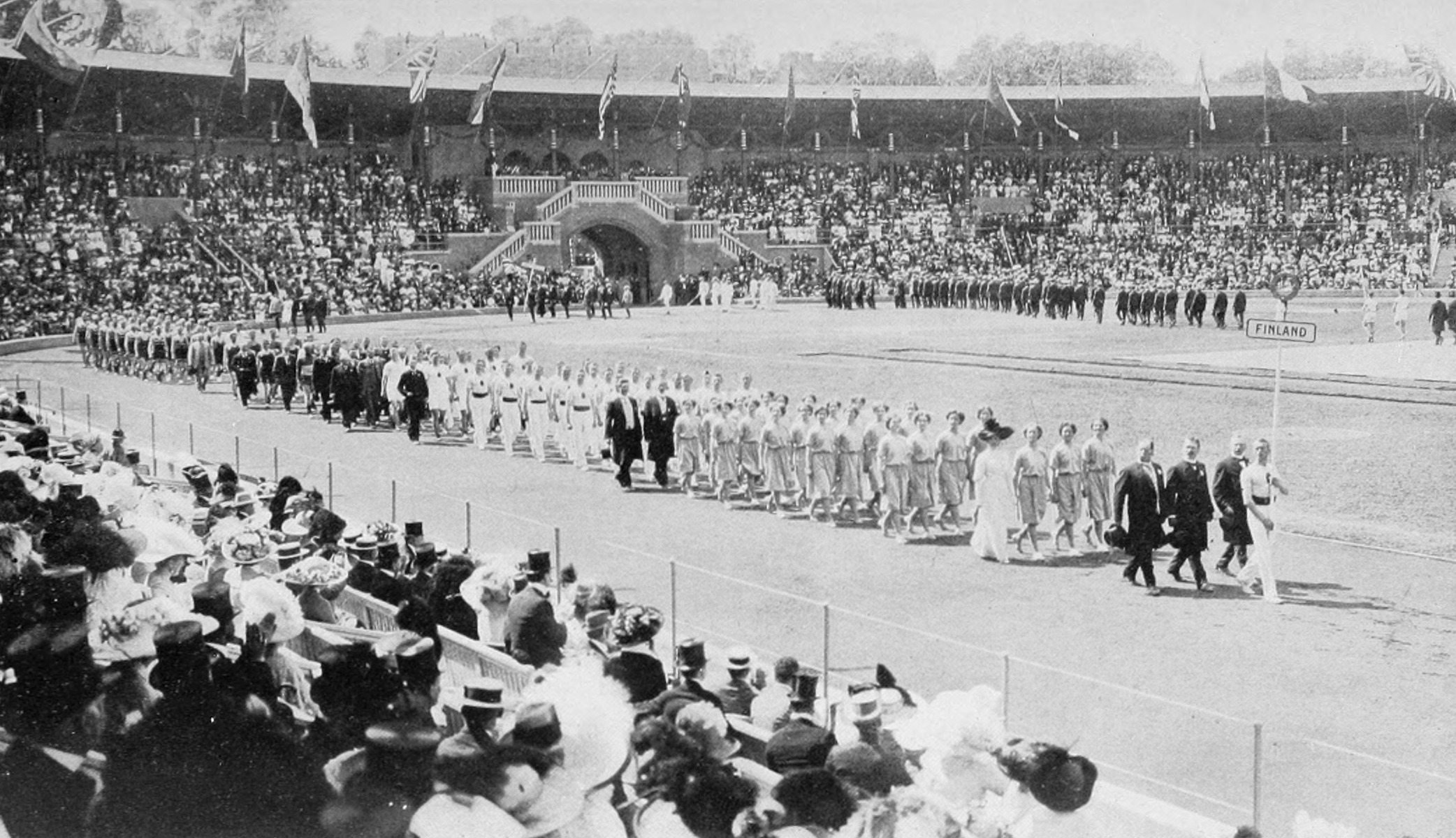
The Finnish team entering stadium during the opening ceremony

The Games of the V Olympiad were opened on 6 July 1912. The Swedish Royal Family left Stockholm Palace at 10:40am, and were received at the Olympic Stadium by members of the IOC. Three thousand competing athletes had already assembled in the nearby Östermalm Athletic Grounds, and began to enter the stadium in alphabetical order by nation according to the Swedish spelling. The Swedish team entered last, but unlike the later tradition, the Greek team did not enter first.

A hymn was sung, a traditional Swedish chant was conducted and prayers were read first in Swedish and then in English. Crown Prince Gustaf Adolf addressed the King on behalf of the Swedish Olympic Association. King Gustav V then declared the Games officially open by a long speech:

It is with legitimate joy and pride that we Swedes see athletes from every part of the world gathered here with us. It is a great honour for Sweden that Stockholm has been chosen as the scene of the Fifth Olympiad, and I bid all of you, athletes and friends of athletics, a most hearty welcome to this friendly contest of the nations. May the grand thought that found expression in the Olympic Games in classic times be so held in honour by our age too, that these competitions may become a powerful means to promote the physical health and development of every people. With these words, I herewith declare the Olympic Games of Stockholm opened.

— King Gustav V

Afterwards a trumpet fanfare was played and the Crown Prince called for cheers for the King. The athletes in their national groups marching out of the stadium in order ended the ceremony.

== Events ==
Pathé newsreel showing highlights from the 1912 Olympics, including gymnastics, athletics, and fencing

The Swedish delegation at the IOC meeting in Berlin on 28 May 1909 had proposed a simple Olympic schedule containing only "pure" athletics, swimming, gymnastics and wrestling. However other countries requested that the schedule be more comprehensive, and with that in mind they put forward a further programme at the IOC meeting in 1911 which was met with approval. The sports which were added were the tug of war, cycling, fencing, football, horse riding, lawn tennis, rowing, shooting, skating and yacht racing. The question of adding skating to the programme was discussed once more on 7 February 1910, with the decision being made to drop it from the schedule. It was felt to be unsuitable because it was a winter sport, and it was to be part of the Nordic Games the following year. Boxing was removed from the programme as it was unappealing to the Swedes. Art competitions were considered at a further meeting on 14 February 1910, and were subsequently added to the programme, but now art competitions are no longer regarded as official Olympic events by the International Olympic Committee. As a result, now the 1912 Summer Olympics programme considered composed of 14 sports encompassing 18 disciplines and 102 events. The number of events in each discipline is noted in parentheses.

- Aquatics
  - Diving (4)
  - Swimming (9)
  - Water polo (1)
- Athletics (30)
- Cycling (2)
- Equestrian
  - Dressage (1)
  - Eventing (2)
  - Show jumping (2)
- Fencing (5)
- Football (1)
- Gymnastics (4)
- Modern pentathlon (1)
- Rowing (4)
- Sailing (4)
- Shooting (18)
- Tennis (8)
- Tug of war (1)
- Wrestling (5)

Baseball, Glima (as the second Olympic demonstration of the sport after 1908 Summer Olympics) and Gotland sports were unofficial demonstration sports. This was also the first year art competitions were held at the Olympics.

=== Athletics ===
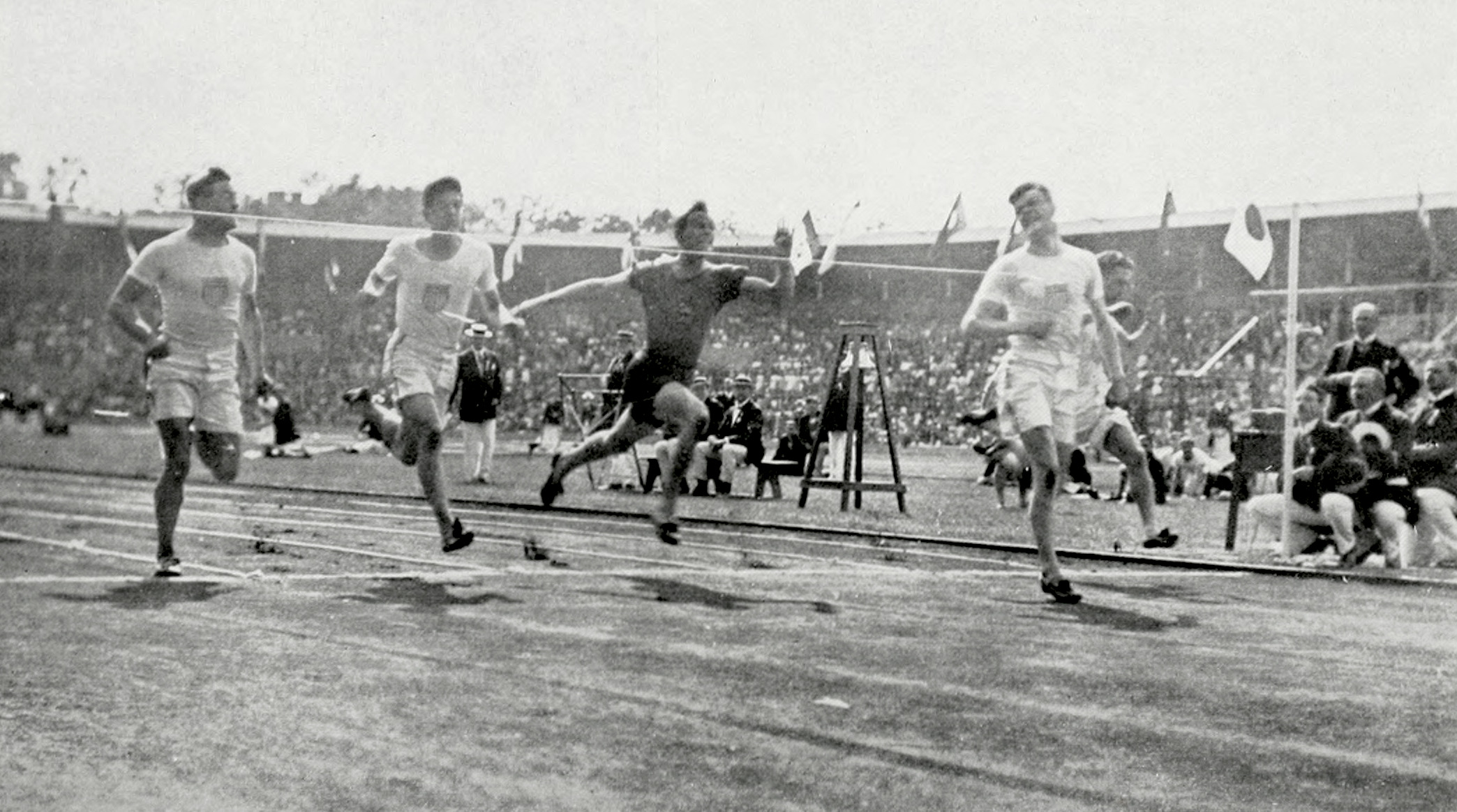
The final moments of the men's 100 metre final

The athletic events saw the introduction of a fully automatic timing system developed by R. Carlstedt. It involved attaching electromagnets to chronometers in a system which attached a control lamp to the starting gun for each race. This resulted in the firing of the gun starting a timer which was then stopped by one of the judges at the finishing line. The final of the men's 100 metres was expected to be a mostly American affair, and it ended up with six athletes, only one of whom was not from the United States. It suffered from seven false starts before the athletes finally got away, with Ralph Craig winning the gold medal by 60 centimetres (24 in) in front of second place Alvah Meyer. Donald Lippincott won bronze, 15 cm behind the second man.

Shizo Kanakuri, a Japanese marathon runner, went missing during the race. He lost consciousness by heatstroke and a farming family helped him to stop at a party taking place in a villa on the marathon route in order to quench his thirst, then caught a train to Stockholm and left the country the next day. He returned to Japan without notifying race officials. Fifty years later, after being invited back by the Swedish authorities, he completed the race with an (unofficial) time of 54 years, 8 months, 6 days, 8 hours, 32 minutes and 20.3 seconds. Portuguese Francisco Lázaro died from heat exhaustion while running the marathon, the only athlete to die during the running of an Olympic marathon. In addition to the physical toll of the event, the reported split time for the 5 km checkpoint at Stocksund (2:17:20 after a 1:48:00 start) implies an unusually slow 29:20 opening segment, followed by an unrealistically fast 10 km pace. Olympic marathon historian David E. Martin has noted this discrepancy as a likely timing error.

American Jim Thorpe won the pentathlon and the newly created decathlon. Thorpe's gold medals were stripped by the International Olympic Committee in 1913, after the IOC learned that Thorpe had taken expense money for playing baseball, violating contemporary Olympic amateurism rules, before the 1912 Games. This moved everyone else up in the rankings. In 1982, the IOC was convinced that the disqualification had been improper, as no protest against Thorpe's eligibility had been brought within the required 30 days, and reinstated Thorpe's medals. The replicas were presented to his children in 1983, 30 years after Thorpe's death. Finally, in 2022, the IOC posthumously declared Thorpe as the sole winner of the pentathlon and decathlon events after extensive consultations with his former competitors' families who said they had always viewed Thorpe as the winner.

New Olympic records were set in the majority of track and field events, with only the men's 200 metres, 10 km walk, standing high jump, standing broad jump, hop, step and jump, and the hurdle competitions failing to have new records set. Tell Berna captured a gold for the 3000m and Henry S. "Harry" Babcock took gold for the pole vault, setting an Olympic Record at 3.95m. Hannes Kolehmainen was the most successful in setting records at the games, with new Olympic Records set in the 5,000, 10,000 metre and cross country races.

=== Cycling ===
The cycling events at the 1912 Games were limited to a road race around Lake Mälaren, which had already been a successful route for a yearly cycling race. Although not originally in the schedule, several countries requested that track cycling be added; however, the organizing committee stuck by their plans not to build a new track cycling stadium as the only one in Stockholm had been destroyed in order for the Olympic Stadium to be built. In addition, Germany had specifically requested Cycle-Polo and Figure-Cycling to be added to the programme, both of which requests were turned down by the committee.

It was decided to hold the road race as a time trial, and to outlaw any non-competitive cyclists acting as pacemakers. Nineteen nations entered 151 athletes into the competition, which was a greater number than expected by the committee. The largest group was from Great Britain, who had entered twelve competitors from England, another twelve from Scotland, and a further nine from Ireland. The race began on 7 July, with the athletes leaving in groups. The first group left at 2am, with the remaining groups leaving at intervals of two minutes. The distance raced was 318 kilometres (198 mi), with South African Rudolph Lewis winning the gold medal in the individual race. Frederick Grubb of Great Britain won the silver medal, and Carl Schutte of the United States won the bronze. However, the average positions of the Swedish team were better than their competitors', and so the Swedish team won the gold medal for the team competition. The silver and bronze medals followed the individual victories, going to Great Britain and the United States respectively – giving Grubb and Schutte a second medal each of the same varieties.

=== Diving ===
All of the medals in the men's competitions were split between the diving teams of the Sweden and Germany. The men's high dive was a Swedish white out, with Swedish divers taking all three medal positions. Erik Adlerz took the gold medal, and proceeded to take the gold medal for Sweden in the 10 metre platform too. Albert Zürner took the silver for Germany, and Gustaf Blomgren won the bronze medal for Sweden. Another white out occurred in the 3 metre springboard with all three medals going to the German team, with Paul Günther taking gold, Hans Luber in the silver medal position and Kurt Behrens in bronze. A 10-metre platform event also took place for women, with Sweden taking two more medals, Greta Johansson in gold and Lisa Regnell in silver. Great Britain's Isabelle White won the bronze medal. The remaining finalists were all from Sweden.

=== Equestrian ===
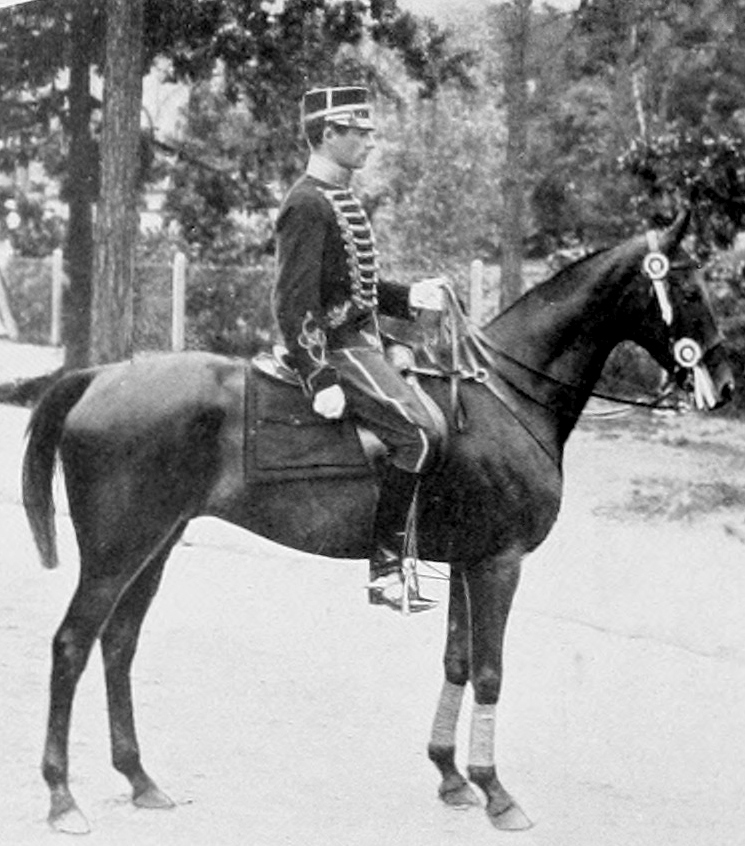
Axel Nordlander, who won two gold medals for Sweden in dressage

Equestrian made its first appearance at a modern Olympics in the 1912 Games. Although competitions involving horse riding had been included in the programme of 1900, this was the first appearance of modern Olympic staples such as dressage, eventing and show jumping. It was expected that the competitors would be military personnel as they would have had the cavalry experience to compete. The competition was split between the military competitions, prize riding and prize jumping.

In the military competition, seven countries put forward competitors for the individual and team eventing. Each nation put forward four athletes with the exception of Denmark, which only put forward three. Some of the countries also nominated reserves in addition to their main athletes. The total length of the course was 55 kilometres (34 mi) with the start and finish both in the grounds of the Field Riding Club. The heat was such on the day of the event that competitors lost as much as 4.5 pounds (2.0 kg) in weight. Swede Axel Nordlander won the individual competition, and led the Swedish eventing team to victory as well, earning himself two gold medals. In second place in the individual competition was German Friedrich von Rochow, who also earned a second silver medal as the team from Germany placed second overall. Only the bronze medals were split up between nationalities, with the American team including Guy Vernor Henry, Jr. taking the bronze for the team event, while Frenchman Jacques Cariou won the individual medal.

Two additional countries entered for the dressage, although only Sweden entered the maximum number of competitors. The event resulted in Sweden taking all three medals, with the gold going to Carl Bonde, the silver to Gustaf Adolf Boltenstern and the bronze to Hans von Blixen-Finecke. The individual show jumping competition was the only individual equestrian event at the 1912 Olympics in which Sweden won no medals, with the gold medal instead going to Cariou of the French to add to his bronze medal from the dressage, Rabod von Kröcher taking the silver for Germany, and Emmanuel de Blommaert winning the bronze for Belgium. The team event saw Sweden take another gold medal, with the French team second and the German team, featuring Prince Friedrich Karl of Prussia, in the bronze medal position.

=== Fencing ===
The foil competition became a full Olympic event, having appeared at the 1908 Games as a demonstration sport. Nedo Nadi and Pietro Speciale of Italy took the gold and silver medals respectively, and Richard Verderber of Austria placed third. There were individual and team events in both épée and sabre. The épée team event saw Belgium take the gold medal and Great Britain and the Netherlands in second and third place respectively. A member of the Belgian team went on to take the individual title as well, with Paul Anspach taking the gold medal. Ivan Joseph Martin Osiier of Denmark took the silver medal, and another Belgian who was not in the team event, Philippe le Hardy de Beaulieu, won the bronze medal.

The sabre competition was dominated by the competitors from Hungary, with their team taking the gold medal over Austria and the Netherlands. The individual competition saw a shut out by Hungarian athletes with Jenő Fuchs winning the overall competition, Béla Békessy in second and Ervin Mészáros in third.

=== Football ===
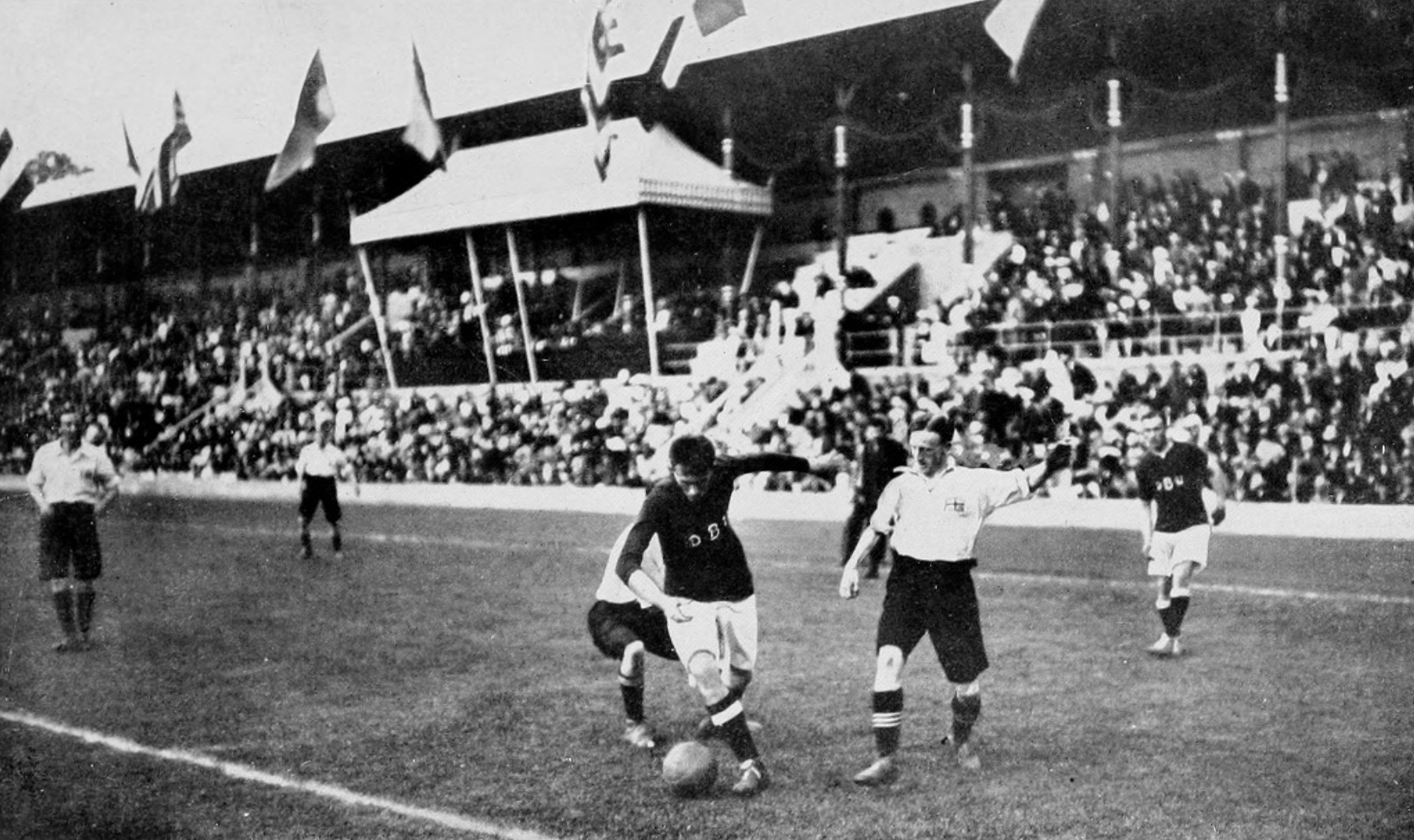
Great Britain plays Denmark in the final of the football tournament

Thirteen countries signalled their intention to enter football teams for the 1912 Olympics. A standard cup tie system was implemented, with the final deciding the gold and silver medallists and a third/fourth position playoff deciding the bronze medal winner. Only FIFA affiliated teams were allowed to take part, with the public draw for the tournament taking place on 18 June 1911. The tournament itself started on 29 June. In the first round Finland defeated Italy 3–2, Austria beat Germany 5–1 and the Netherlands emerged victorious over Sweden 4–3. The team from Great Britain, who had won the gold medal at the 1908 Summer Games, were given a bye to the second round, where they faced Hungary and won 7–0. Finland also won their match, defeating Russia 2–1. Denmark matched the British scoreline, winning 7–0 against Norway, and the Netherlands won against Austria 3–1.

The semi final matches pitted Great Britain against Finland, where they won 4–0, and Denmark against the Netherlands, ending in a 4–1 victory for Denmark. The Netherlands won the third/fourth place playoff by the biggest scoreline of the tournament, beating Finland 9–0. Later on the same day the final was played in the Olympic Stadium, where Great Britain retained its gold medal against Denmark in front of 25,000 spectators. Goals from Harold Walden, Arthur Berry and two from Gordon Hoare helped Britain to win by a margin of 4–2.

=== Gymnastics ===
The gymnastic competition at the 1912 Games featured a single individual competition and three team events in addition to a variety of displays by the various teams. The Swedish team naturally won the Gymnastics event of the Swedish system, referred to in the programme as "Team Competition I", with fellow Scandinavian teams Denmark and Norway taking the second and third positions. The all around team competition came second, with Italy taking the gold. In addition, one of the Italian team members, Alberto Braglia, won the individual gold for the same event. Louis Ségura of the French team won the individual silver, while another member of the Italian team, Adolfo Tunesi, won the individual bronze. The all around team competition saw Hungary take the silver medal and the team from Great Britain in third place. The final team competition allowed for a free choice of movements and apparatus. This was another all Scandinavian affair, with the Norwegian team emerging victorious, Finland in second and Denmark in the bronze medal position.

=== Modern pentathlon ===
Modern pentathlon was competed for at the 1912 Games, marking its first appearance in the Olympics. It was for these games that the five events of shooting, swimming, equestrian, fencing and cross country running were decided to make up the pentathlon. The competition was spread out across five days from 7 through to 12 July, ending with the cross country race. Only men participated in the event, although a woman named Helen Preece was briefly enrolled to compete until the organizing committee ultimately denied her entry.

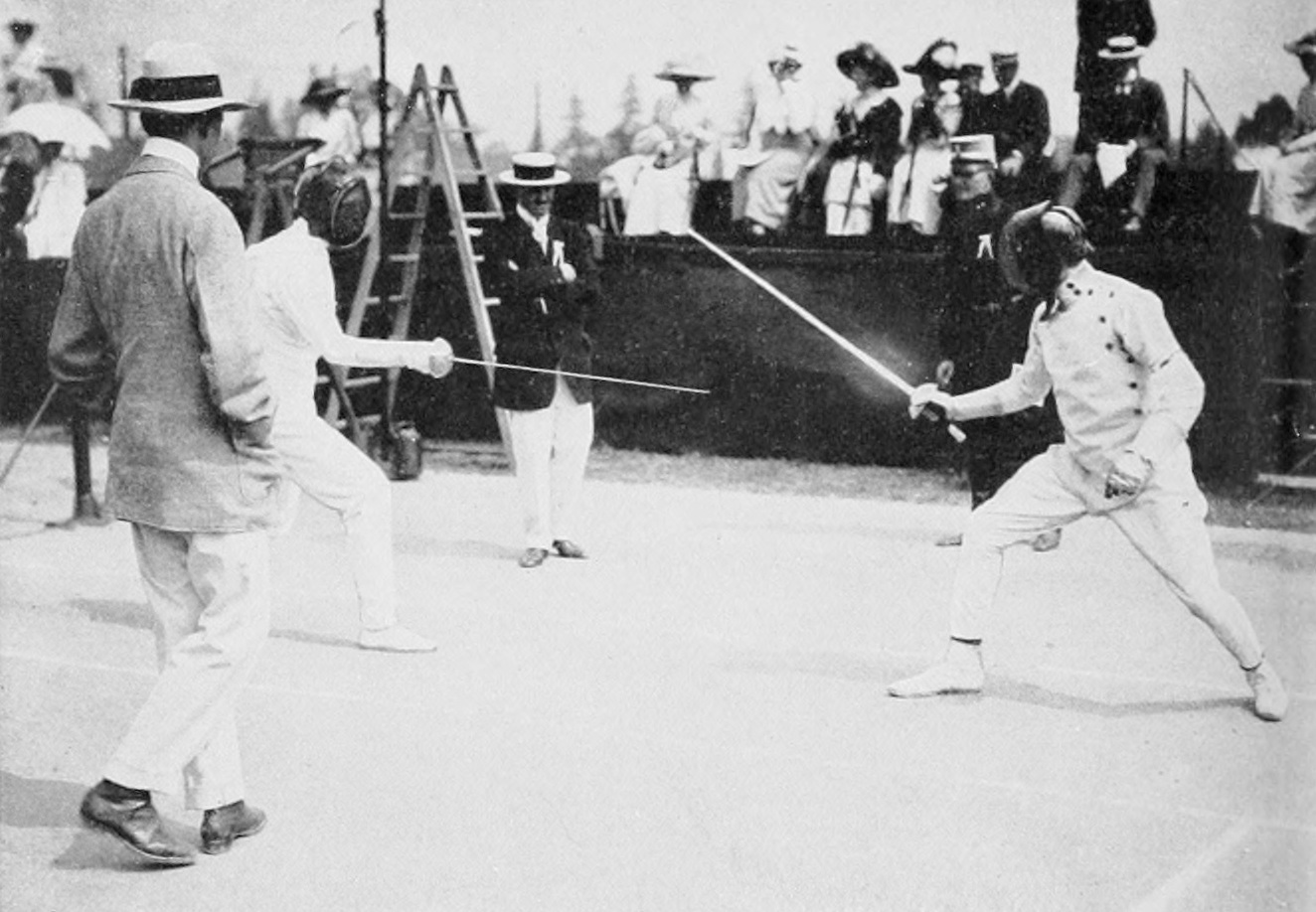
Jean de Mas Latrie and George S. Patton competing in the fencing event of the Modern pentathlon

For the shooting element, each competitor was allowed to bring their own pistol. The American competitor George S. Patton (later better known as the Second World War US Army General) used a .38 caliber Colt revolver, while the Danish competitors preferred the Danish Army service pistol, the Bergmann–Bayard, the Germans and Norwegians used the Luger P08 pistol and the Swedes used a target practice pistol by Smith & Wesson. The shooting part of the competition was won by Gösta Åsbrink, with Georg de Laval and Gösta Lilliehöök in second and third place respectively, all three representing Sweden.

The swimming event was three lengths, each of 100 metres (330 ft), with the athletes split into eight heats and times going forward to calculate positions. Ralph Clilverd of Great Britain won this event, with Edmond Bernhardt of Austria in second and de Laval in third. The fencing competition saw each competitor face off against each other. Several opponents were noted for their particular skill in the event with Åke Grönhagen of Sweden coming first with 24 wins, Jean de Mas Latrie of France second with 23, Sidney Stranne of Sweden in third with 21 and Patton of the United States close behind with 20. Thirteen of the competitors cleared the equestrian course without any penalties, with Grönhagen winning the event, Bror Mannström of Sweden in second and de Laval third.

The cross country run was over 4,000 metres and started in the Olympic Stadium itself. The event was run as a time trial with competitors leaving one minute apart. As this was the final event, the winning competitors were announced after the race, with Lilliehöök winning the gold medal, Åsbrink taking silver and de Laval, bronze. The highest placed non-Swedish competitor was Patton, who finished fifth.

=== Rowing ===
The rowing events at the 1912 Olympics did not prove popular with the public. This was put down to the "fatigue" of the public due to the volume of sporting events. The eight competition was split into heats, with two teams in each heat. The two British crews were lucky not to be drawn against each other, with the team from Leander Club facing New College, Oxford in the final. Leander won by a length with a time of 6:15. The coxed four followed a similar format to the eights, with the German team from Ludwigshafener Ruderverein defeating Britain's Thames Rowing Club in the final.

The competition for the coxed four, inriggers was much smaller, with only four nations competing. The Danish team defeated Sweden in the final. The single sculls heats proved controversial with the first round race between Mart Kuusik and Alfred Heinrich being re-run after a protest by Heinrich. In addition, Cecil McVilly was disqualified in the first round after colliding with the boat of Martin Stahnke. Wally Kinnear of Great Britain defeated Polydore Veirman of Belgium in the final, with Kinnear winning the matchup easily.

=== Sailing ===
The yachts for the sailing competition assembled at Nynäshamn on 19 July, along with the other vessels that were to take part in an Olympic regatta. The racing itself started the following day with the 12 metre class. There were only three nations and yachts competing in this event, the hosts Sweden, as well as Norway and Finland. Norway won the gold medal, Sweden the silver and Finland came in last place, winning bronze. The 10 metre class had the same number of countries entering it, although this time Sweden entered two yachts and Russia competed instead of Norway. The Swedish yacht Kitty was the winning vessel, with the Finnish boat in second and the Russians coming third.

A slightly improved field was featured in the 8 metre class, with four countries entering two yachts each. The medals were awarded to exactly the same nations as the 12 metre class, another all Scandinavian affair. The 6 metre class saw the most diverse field of any of the sailing events at the 1912 Olympics: six countries entered a total of nine yachts. France and Denmark competed in their only sailing event, along with Sweden, sending two yachts each. Those three nations were the successful in the event, with the French yacht Mac Miche taking the gold, the Danish Nurdug II taking silver and the Swedish Kerstin placing third.

=== Shooting ===
There were eighteen shooting events at the 1912 Olympics, of which eight were team events. The competition was split predominantly into three sections: military rifle shooting, shooting with miniature rifles, pistols and revolvers, and clay bird and running deer shooting. The Swedish and American competitors were the most successful at the competition, with seven gold medals each, although Sweden won a total of seventeen medals while the United States team won fourteen. 64-year-old Oscar Swahn, part of the Swedish single shot running deer team, is still the oldest gold medal winner in Olympic history.

=== Swimming ===
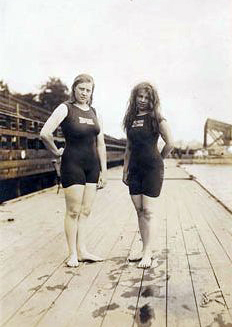
Fanny Durack and Mina Wylie, the gold and silver medallists in the first women's individual swimming event

In swimming, Hawaiian Duke Kahanamoku won the 100 metre freestyle for the United States, who also saw Harry Hebner win gold in the 100 metre backstroke. The Canadian team also took two gold medals, both by George Hodgson in the 400 and 1,500 metre events. The German swimming team won all three medals in the 200 metre breaststroke, with the gold going to Walter Bathe, who won a further gold in the 400 metre breaststroke. The Australasian team was victorious in the men's relay, with the United States finishing in the silver medal position and Great Britain placing third.

The 1912 Games saw the implementation of swimming events for women, with the 100 metre freestyle and 400 metre team relay taking place. Fanny Durack won the individual contest, breaking the world record for the distance in the fourth heat. Her fellow Australian Mina Wylie won the silver medal, and Jennie Fletcher of Great Britain came third to take the bronze medal. The British team had further success in the women's relay, winning the team relay with the German team in second place and the Austrian team in third. Because only four countries entered the relay there were no heats; only a final was held. The United States did not field a women's team. New Olympic Records were set in all swimming events at the 1912 Games.

=== Tennis ===
Tennis on covered courts was agreed initially for the 1912 Games, with competitions run for gentlemen's singles and doubles, ladies' singles, and mixed doubles. The outdoor tournament was confirmed once the Östermalm Athletic Grounds were completed in late 1911, with the plans modified to have both indoor and outdoor tournaments.

Six countries sent players for the covered court competitions, with representatives from Sweden, Great Britain, Denmark, France, Australasia, and Bohemia appearing. Included in this lineup was Australasia's only competitor, Anthony Wilding from New Zealand, who was also the reigning Wimbledon gentlemen's champion. The indoor knockout competition started on 5 May, and continued as expected until the semi-final round where Wilding was beaten by Britain's Charles P. Dixon. The British player met Frenchman André Gobert in the final, but Gobert was victorious over the Englishman in straight sets. Wilding took the bronze medal in a playoff against another British player, Arthur Lowe.

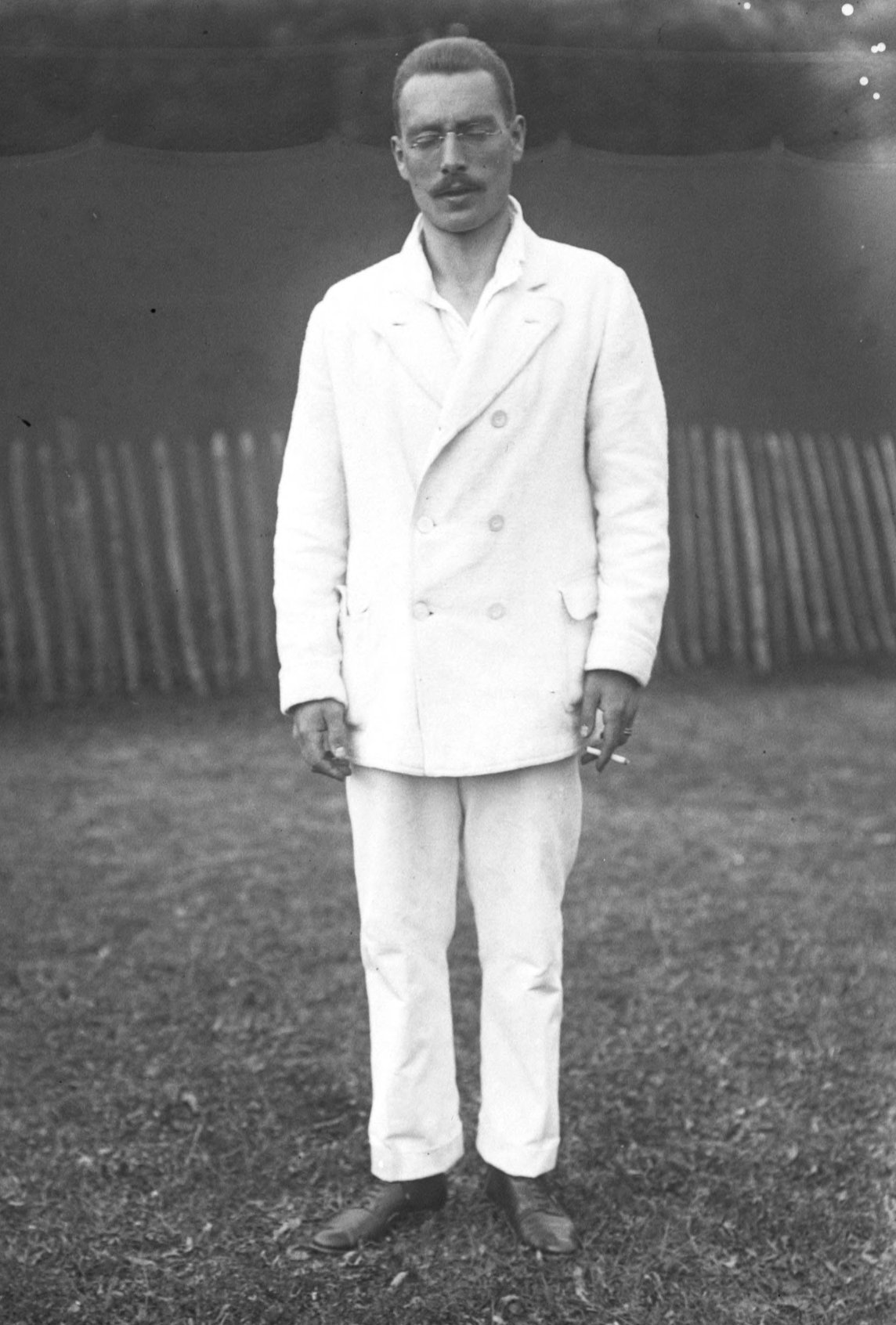
Felix Pipes, tennis doubles silver medalist.

The outdoors tennis competition saw 70 players enter from 12 nations. However, Great Britain did not enter any competitors as the dates of the outdoor competition clashed with the 1912 Wimbledon Championships, despite attempts by the British authorities to convince the Olympic organizing committee to change the dates. Other noted tennis players refused to compete at the Olympics and instead attended Wimbledon. The gold and silver medals in the gentlemen's singles ended up being decided between two South Africans, with Charles Winslow and Harold Kitson playing each other. Winslow won the match and the gold medal, 7–5, 4–6, 10–8, 8–6. The duo also competed as a pair in the gentlemen's doubles and took the gold medal, beating the Austrians Felix Pipes and Arthur Zborzil. Marguerite Broquedis of France defeated Dorothea Koring of Germany in the ladies' singles for the gold medal. In the mixed doubles Koring teamed up with Heinrich Schomburgk to win the gold, the duo defeating Sigrid Fick and Gunnar Setterwall of Sweden in the final.

=== Tug of war ===
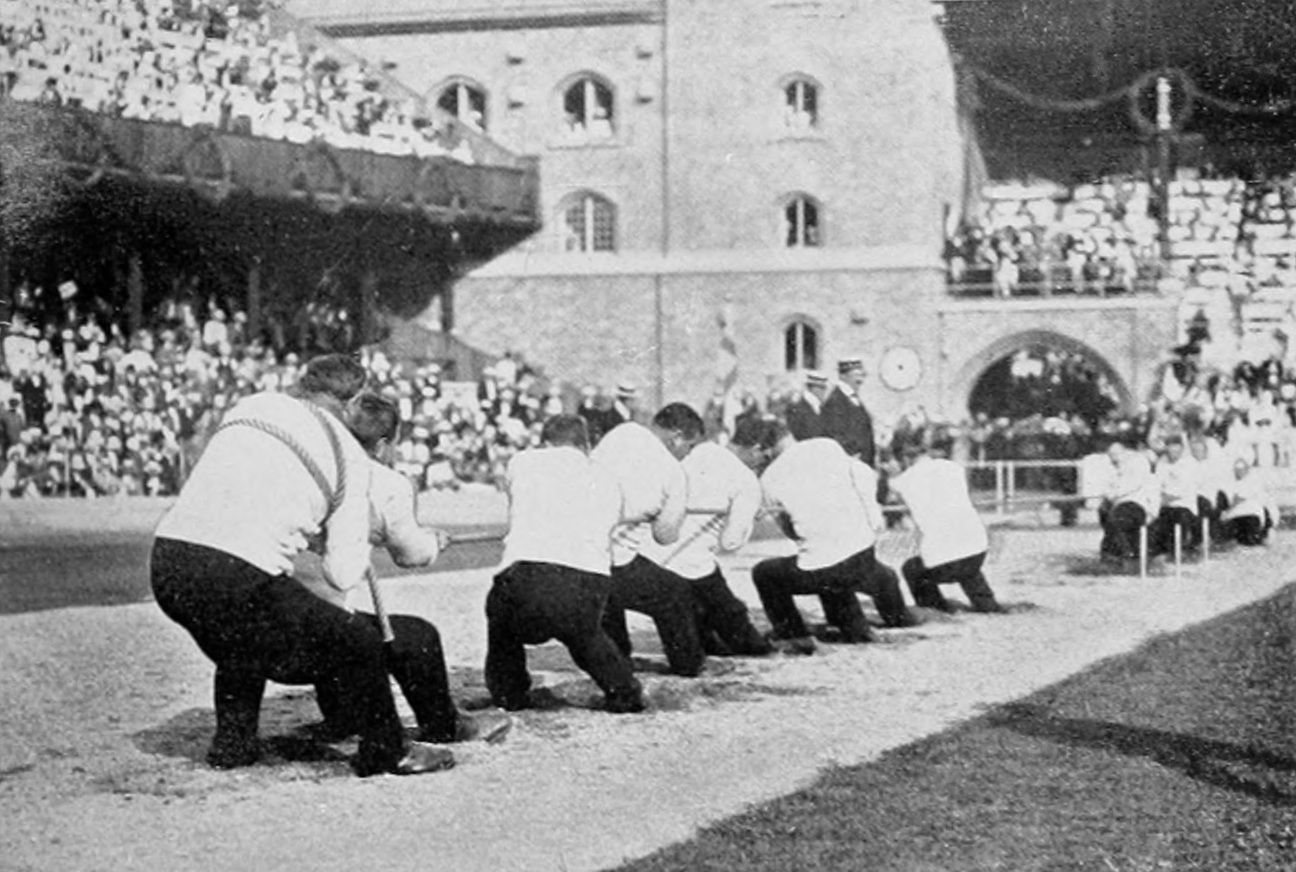
The only tug of war bout which took place at the 1912 Games

The tug of war competition was scheduled to take place between 7 and 12 July, with two matches taking place each day. However, out of the five countries which elected to enter the competition, only two actually appeared. Great Britain arrived for its match against Bohemia, but the opposition team was nowhere to be found. Britain was duly declared the winner. The same thing happened once more for the second match, with the Swedish team, made up of policemen from Stockholm, arriving to find that the Austrian team had not arrived. Sweden was announced as the winners of the match in the Austrians' absence.

On the second day of the competition, Great Britain took on Sweden, the only occasion where both teams actually turned up for the bout. The British team were made up of the winners of the gold medal in the same event at the 1908 Games, with the exception of John Sewell and Mathias Hynes. As the British team also consisted of policemen, the bout ended up effectively being between the City of London Police and the Stockholm Police, with the Swedish team winning 2–0. Due to the non-appearance of the team from Luxembourg, that one match ended up being the entire tug of war event at the 1912 Olympics. Sweden was awarded the gold medal and Great Britain the silver.

=== Water polo ===
The water polo tournament was set up on a modified elimination system as there were six teams entered. The first round saw the British team defeating the Belgian team, Sweden defeating the French team and Austria defeating Hungary. Lots were drawn to determine which match would take place in the second round as there were three teams left in the competition. Great Britain were drawn to face Sweden, who they defeated. Austria automatically qualified for the final against the winner of the Britain-Sweden matchup. Great Britain won the gold medal in the event, defeating Austria 8–0. Playoff matches were then played between each pair of defeated teams in order to decide the second and third places. Sweden and Belgium played off after a further three matches to decide the silver and bronze medal positions, with Sweden emerging victorious 4–2.

=== Wrestling ===
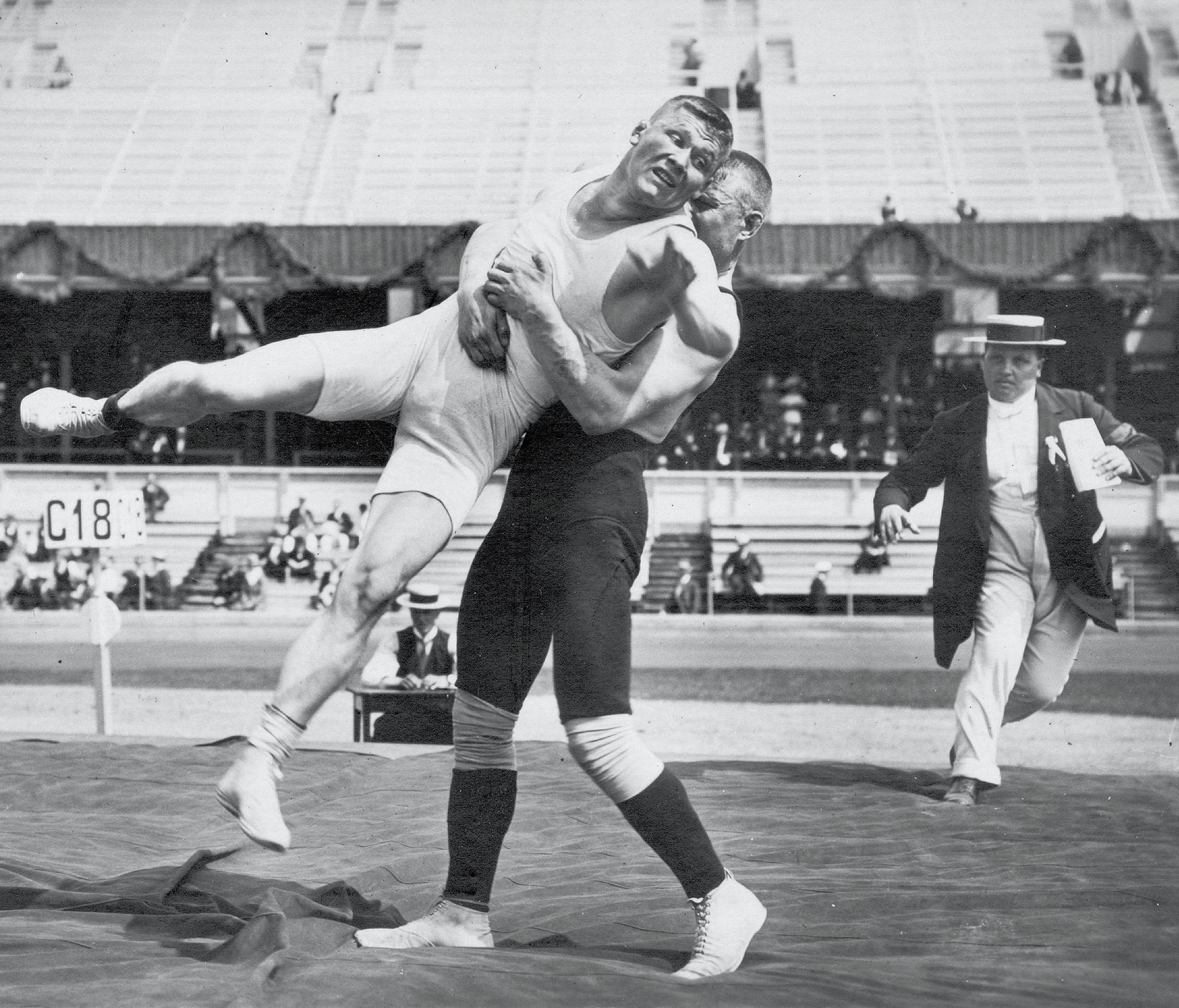
Martin Klein and Alfred Asikainen, whose wrestling bout lasted for 11 hours and 40 minutes

The nations at the 1912 Games entered a total of 267 wrestlers, although the actual competitors who appeared in Sweden were fewer, with 171 actually turning up to compete. Greco-Roman wrestling was the only style of wrestling competed for at the Games. The bouts took place in the open air in an area of the Olympic stadium, with the wrestlers split according to weight into five divisions: featherweight, lightweight, middleweight A (later referred to as middleweight), middleweight B (later referred to as light heavyweight) and heavyweight.

The skills of the competitors from Finland were noted in the featherweight competition, with Kaarlo Koskelo taking the gold medal, while German Georg Gerstäcker took silver and a further medal went to Finland with Otto Lasanen taking bronze. The lightweight class drew the most attention from the public, with Emil Väre winning gold after beating all of his opponents by pin rather than by points. Swedish wrestlers Gustaf Malmström and Edvin Mattiasson took the silver and bronze medals respectively. Claes Johanson won Sweden's only gold medal in the middleweight competition, with his fellow finalist from Russia, Martin Klein, retiring before fighting Johanson in the final. This was due to the semi-final match between Klein and Alfred Asikainen of Finland lasting 11 hours and forty minutes, although they took breaks for refreshments every half-hour. Klein was awarded the silver medal and Asikainen the bronze.

The light heavyweight competition saw another marathon length match, with the bout between Anders Ahlgren of Sweden and Ivar Böhling of Finland for the gold medal lasting more than nine hours. The match was then declared a draw with both athletes being awarded the silver medal as neither won the match. The bronze medal went to Hungary's Béla Varga, who was defeated by Ahlgren in the semi-final match. Yrjö Saarela of Finland was victorious in the heavyweight competition after having placed second in the light heavyweight event at the 1908 Games. Johan Olin took another medal for Finland with the silver and Søren Marinus Jensen repeated his bronze medal at the 1908 Olympics with another for Denmark.

=== Art competitions ===
The 1912 Summer Olympics saw the introduction of art competitions at the Summer Olympics. Events were implemented for literature, sculpture, painting, architecture and music. Walter Winans won the gold medal for his sculpture, An American Trotter, which added to his previous gold medal for the running deer (double shot) competition at the 1908 Olympics and the silver medal in the running deer competition in 1912.

Baron Pierre de Coubertin, President of the IOC and founder of the modern Olympic movement, won the gold medal for literature. He actually entered the competition under the pseudonyms of Georges Hohrod and Martin Eschbach from Germany. With the exception of the sculpture competition, only gold medals were issued. Italian Riccardo Barthelemy won the medal for music with his Olympic Triumphal March, and fellow countryman Giovanni Pellegrini won the gold for painting. The Swiss architects Eugène-Edouard Monod and Alphonse Laverrière shared the gold for their stadium design. The sole silver medal, for sculpture, went to Frenchman Georges Dubois for his Model of the entrance to a modern stadium.

=== Demonstration sports ===
In the evening of 7 July, demonstrations took place in the Olympic Stadium of sports from the Swedish island of Gotland. These began at 7:30pm with a demonstration of Pärk, a type of tennis with seven players a side. At the same time, at the other end of the stadium, a type of Icelandic wrestling called Glima was demonstrated. Once those displays had concluded, further demonstrations were made of the Swedish sport varpa, similar to quoits, and stångstörtning, a version of the caber toss. The three disciplines showcased were pärk, varpa and stångstörtning.

Baseball was also demonstrated at the Games. A game was played between the United States, the nation where the game was developed, and Sweden, the host nation. The game was held on Monday, 15 July 1912 and started at 10 a.m. on the Ostermalm Athletic Grounds in Stockholm. The Americans were represented by various members of the American Olympic track and field athletics delegation, while the Swedish team was the Vesterås Baseball Club, which had been formed in 1910 as the first baseball club in Sweden. Four of the Americans played for Sweden, as the Swedish pitchers and catchers were inexperienced. One Swede eventually relieved Adams and Nelson, the American pitchers.

Six innings were played, with the Americans not batting in the sixth and allowing the Swedes to have six outs in their half of the inning. The game was umpired by George Wright, a retired American National League baseball player.

== Participating nations ==
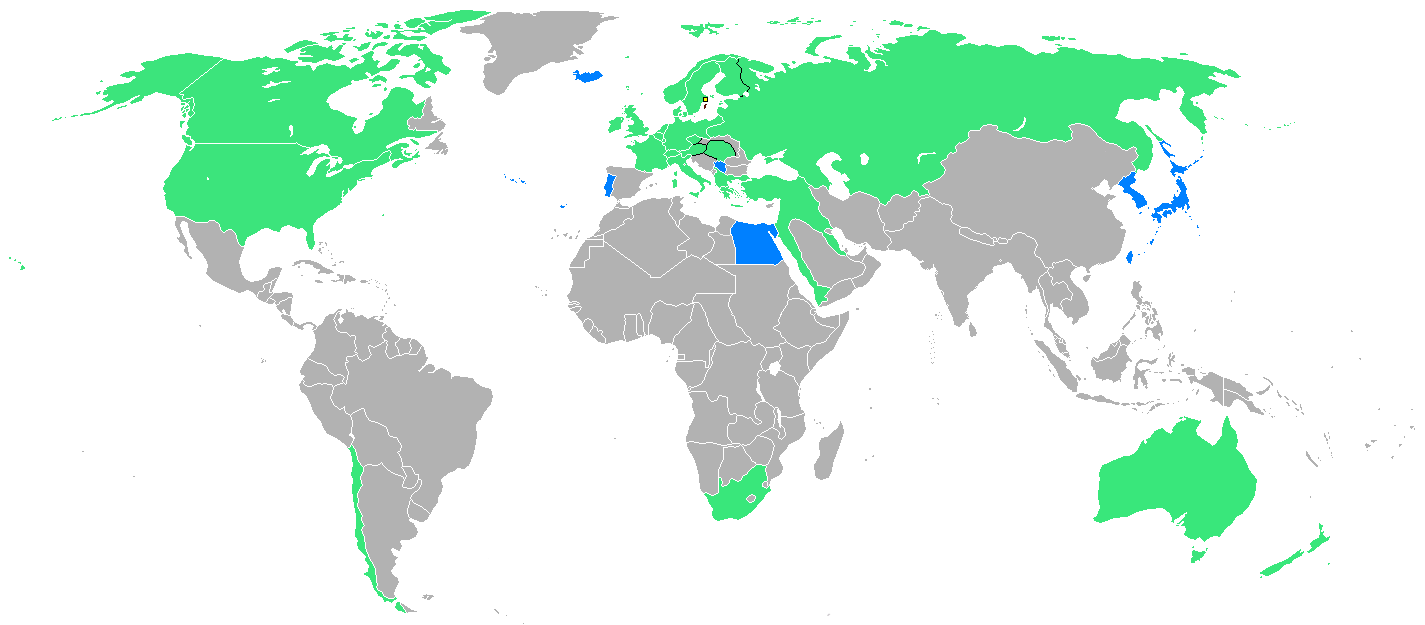
Participants; blue: first time. Yellow dot: Stockholm

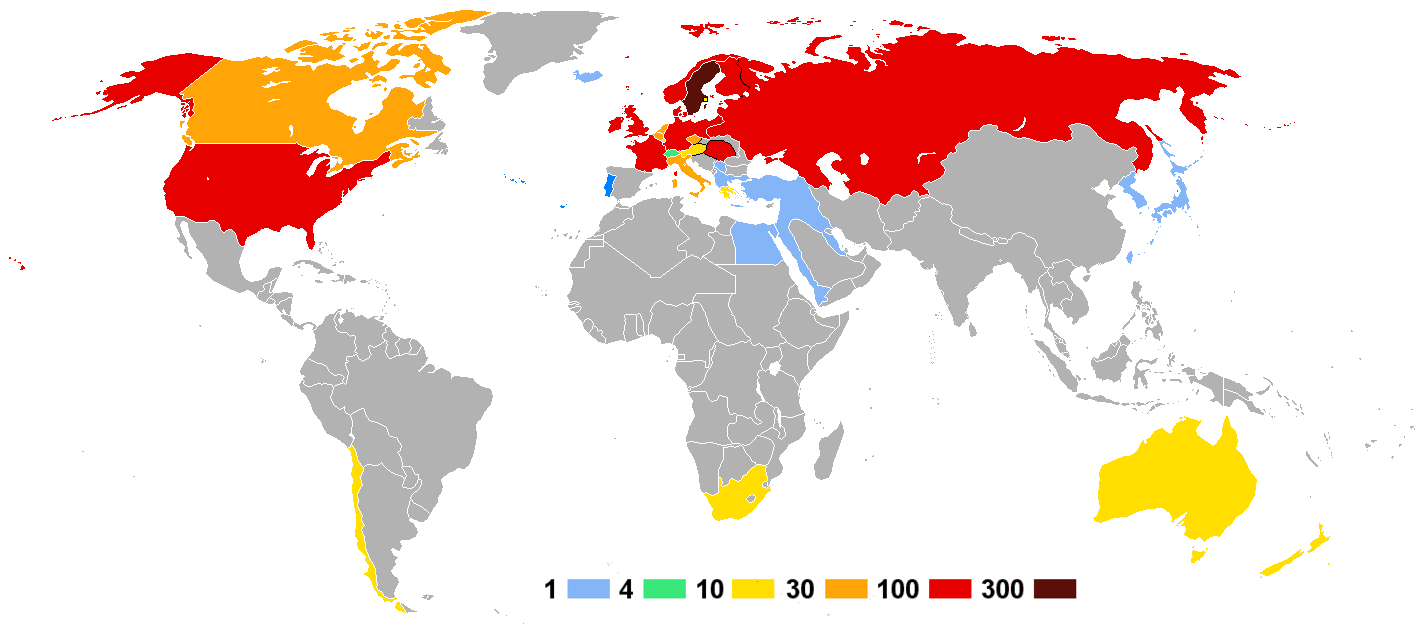
Number of athletes

Twenty-eight nations competed at the 1912 Games. Egypt participated for the first time, as did Luxembourg, Iceland, Portugal, and Serbia. Japan also made their Olympic debut, marking the first appearance of an Asian country at an Olympic Games. Chile made its first appearance as a national team, with fourteen athletes attending the Games, although it had previously entered one individual at the 1896 Games. This was also the first time that athletes from Armenia had competed in the Olympics, as part of the team from Turkey (the officially recognised name for the Ottoman Empire). Serbia's appearance was the only time it attended an Olympic Games as an independent nation until the 2008 Summer Olympics, almost one hundred years later.

The only nation that participated in the previous games in London 1908 but was absent in Stockholm 1912 was Argentina.

Austria and Hungary competed as two sovereign countries. The polity known as Austria-Hungary is mistakenly considered a single sovereign country, while in reality they were two sovereign states in real union with a single monarch who was titled both emperor of Austria and king of Hungary.

At the time, Australasia (Australia and New Zealand), Canada and South Africa were all part of the British Empire. Bohemia was part of Austria-Hungary. Iceland was part of Denmark. Finland was part of Russia. Egypt was de jure under the control of Turkey, but had been de facto run by the British since 1882.

This was the last Olympics that allowed "private entries", i.e. individual athletes that were not part of a country's officially selected team. Arnold Jackson was one such private entry; he won the 1500 metres by 0.1 seconds, ahead of an American trio, in what was acclaimed at the time to be "the greatest race ever run". His medal is still credited to the United Kingdom, however.

Participating National Olympic Committees
- Australasia (26)
- Austria (85)
- Belgium (36)
- Bohemia (39)
- Canada (36)
- Chile (14)
- Denmark (152)
- Egypt (1)
- Finland (164)
- France (112)
- Germany (187)
- Great Britain (279)
- Greece (22)
- Hungary (119)
- Iceland (2)
- Italy (68)
- Japan (2)
- Luxembourg (21)
- Netherlands (33)
- Norway (191)
- Portugal (6)
- Russian Empire (159)
- Serbia (2)
- South Africa (21)
- Sweden (444) (host)
- Switzerland (1)
- Turkey (2)
- United States (174)

=== Number of athletes by National Olympic Committees ===
IOC Letter Code	Country	Athletes
SWE	Sweden	444
GBR	Great Britain	279
NOR	Norway	191
GER	Germany	187
USA	United States	174
FIN	Finland	164
RU1	Russian Empire	159
DEN	Denmark	152
HUN	Hungary	119
FRA	France	112
AUT	Austria	85
ITA	Italy	68
BOH	Bohemia	39
BEL	Belgium	36
CAN	Canada	36
NED	Netherlands	33
ANZ	Australasia	26
GRE	Greece	22
LUX	Luxembourg	21
ZAF	South Africa	21
CHI	Chile	14
POR	Portugal	6
ISL	Iceland	2
JPN	Japan	2
SRB	Serbia	2
TUR	Turkey	2
EGY	Egypt	1
SUI	Switzerland	1
Total		2,404

== Medal count ==
These are the top 10 nations that won medals at the 1912 Games. The medals themselves included solid gold medals, the last time these were given out.

Rank	Nation	Gold	Silver	Bronze	Total
1	United States	26	19	19	64
2	Sweden (host nation)	23	25	17	65
3	(United Kingdom) Great Britain	10	15	16	41
4	Finland	9	8	9	26
5	France	7	4	3	14
6	Germany	5	13	7	25
7	South Africa	4	2	0	6
8	Norway	3	2	5	10
9	Canada	3	2	3	8
9	Hungary	3	2	3	8

== See also ==
- List of IOC country codes

Summer Olympics
Preceded by London	V Olympiad; Stockholm; 1912	Succeeded by Berlin cancelled due to World War I
