= Deaths in December 2013 =

The following is a list of notable deaths in December 2013.

Entries for each day are listed alphabetically by surname. A typical entry lists information in the following sequence:

- Name, age, country of citizenship and reason for notability, established cause of death, reference.

== December 2013 ==
=== 1 ===
- Alfonso Armada, 93, Spanish general, co-leader of 1981 failed coup d'état.
- Heinrich Boere, 92, Dutch-German convicted war criminal, member of the Waffen-SS.
- Maria Mambo Café, 68, Angolan politician, Minister of Social Affairs (1982–1986), Governor of Cabinda (1990).
- Maurice Cockrill, 78, British artist.
- Stirling Colgate, 88, American physicist.
- Richard Coughlan, 66, English drummer (Caravan), pneumonia.
- Sylvester Dias, 76, Sri Lankan cricketer.
- Walter E. Ellis, 53, American serial killer, natural causes.
- T. R. Fehrenbach, 88, American author and historian.
- Verdi Godwin, 87, English footballer.
- Lino Grech, 83, Maltese actor, writer and director.
- Edward Heffron, 90, American World War II veteran, portrayed in Band of Brothers.
- Jerzy Matałowski, 65, German-born Polish actor.
- Fernando Sabogal Viana, 72, Colombian Roman Catholic prelate, Auxiliary Bishop of Bogotá (since 1996).
- André Schiffrin, 78, French-born American publisher and editor.
- Martin Sharp, 71, Australian artist, emphysema.
- Antônio Lino da Silva Dinis, 70, Portuguese-born Brazilian Roman Catholic prelate, Bishop of Itumbiara (since 1999).
- Alejandro Urdapilleta, 59, Uruguayan actor.
- Dany Vandenbossche, 57, Belgian politician, member of the Federal Parliament (1995–1999) and Flemish Parliament for East Flanders (1999–2009).
- James von der Heydt, 94, American lawyer and senior (former chief) judge of the District Court for the District of Alaska.

=== 2 ===
- William Allain, 85, American politician, Governor of Mississippi (1984–1988), Attorney General (1980–1984).
- Antonio Ansola, 82, Spanish footballer (Real Sociedad).
- Iván Bächer, 56, Hungarian writer and journalist.
- Bill Beckwith, 38, American contractor (Curb Appeal), motorcycle collision.
- Jean-Claude Beton, 88, Algerian-born French businessman, founder of Orangina.
- Kevin Crawford, 43, American scholar.
- Eva Davies, 88, British Olympic fencer.
- Marcelo Déda, 53, Brazilian politician, Governor of Sergipe (since 2007), cancer.
- John Ewbank, 64, British-born Australian rock climber.
- Rex Garvin, 73, American R&B musician.
- Brian Hitchen, 77, British journalist, Editor of the Daily Star (1987–1994) and Sunday Express (1994–1995), traffic collision.
- Salim Kallas, 77, Syrian actor and politician.
- Toshiko Karasawa, 102, Japanese politician, member of the House of Representatives (1946–1952).
- Gary Leadston, 72, Canadian politician, cancer.
- Junior Murvin, 67, Jamaican reggae singer ("Police and Thieves").
- Joseph Napolitan, 84, American political consultant.
- Liam O'Connor, 58, Irish Gaelic football player (Offaly).
- Mary Riggans, 78, Scottish actress (Take the High Road, Balamory, Dear Frankie), complications of a stroke.
- Pedro Rocha, 70, Uruguayan footballer (Peñarol, São Paulo FC).
- Katsumi Satō, 84, Japanese human rights activist, pneumonia.
- Vernon Shaw, 83, Dominican politician, President (1998–2003).
- Ray Weeks, 83, English cricketer (Warwickshire).
- Christopher Evan Welch, 48, American actor (Vicky Cristina Barcelona, Lincoln, Silicon Valley), lung cancer.
- Paweł Zenon Woś, 92, Polish World War II veteran.

=== 3 ===
- John Albery, 77, British chemist and academic, Master of University College, Oxford (1989–1997).
- Fernando Argenta, 68, Spanish journalist, musician and presenter, pancreatic cancer.
- Paul Aussaresses, 95, French army general.
- Gene Clair, 73, American sound engineer.
- Dick Greuel, 85, American politician, member of the Alaska House of Representatives (1953–1961), Speaker (1957–1959).
- Khalid Hasan, 76, Pakistani cricketer.
- Ronald Hunter, 70, American actor (The Lazarus Syndrome, Van Wilder, Along Came Polly), heart and kidney failure.
- Kiptalam Keter, 80–81, Kenyan Olympic sprinter.
- Niilo Koponen, 85, American politician, member of the Alaska House of Representatives (1983–1993).
- Norbert Kuchinke, 73, German journalist and actor (Autumn Marathon).
- Hugh MacDonald, 84, Scottish nationalist activist.
- Reda Mahmoud Hafez Mohamed, 61, Egyptian military leader, Commander of the Egyptian Air Force (2008–2012), Minister of Military Production (2013).
- Ahmed Fouad Negm, 84, Egyptian vernacular poet.
- Avo Paistik, 77, Estonian cartoonist, film director and painter.
- Edo Patregnani, 75, Italian footballer.
- Ida Pollock, 105, British romance novelist.
- Bill Porter, 81, American door-to-door salesman, subject of Door to Door.
- Sefi Rivlin, 66, Israeli actor and comedian, throat cancer.
- Frank Rozendaal, 56, Dutch ornithologist.
- Sacha Sosno, 76, French sculptor and painter.
- Harry Webber, 77, South African Olympic weightlifter.

=== 4 ===
- Hassan al-Laqqis, Lebanese paramilitary officer, senior commander of Hezbollah, shot.
- Robert Allman, 86, Australian operatic baritone.
- McDonald Bailey, 92, British Olympic sprinter (1948), bronze medalist (1952).
- Henry Cubitt, 4th Baron Ashcombe, 89, British peer.
- Charles Grigg, 97, British comics artist (Korky the Cat, Desperate Dan).
- Greg Hubick, 62, Canadian professional ice hockey player.
- José Esteban Muñoz, 46, Cuban-born American academic.
- Paddy O'Byrne, 83, Irish broadcaster (Radio 702) and actor.
- Joana Raspall i Juanola, 100, Spanish Catalan writer.
- Alexander Rennie, 54, South African Olympic slalom canoer (1992), plane crash.
- Murarilal Singh, 61, Indian politician, stroke.
- Don Williams, 86, American football coach.

=== 5 ===
- Pierre Aliker, 106, French Martinican politician and independence activist, complications from a fall.
- Fred Bassetti, 96, American architect.
- Jean-Luc Benoziglio, 72, Swiss writer.
- Iryna Charnushenka-Stasiuk, 34, Belarusian Olympic long jumper (2008), cancer.
- Robert Doerr, 99, American politician and educator, Mayor of San Jose, California (1956–1958).
- William B. Edmondson, 86, American diplomat, Ambassador to South Africa (1978–1981).
- Günther Förg, 61, German artist.
- Monte Fresco, 77, British sports photographer.
- Ruperto Inchausti, 95, Bolivian footballer (The Strongest, national team).
- Barry Jackson, 75, English actor (Doctor Who, Wimbledon, Midsomer Murders).
- John Alan Lee, 80, Canadian writer, academic and political activist, suicide.
- Nelson Mandela, 95, South African anti-apartheid activist and politician, President (1994–1999), lung infection.
- Tim Marcum, 69, American football coach.
- Danny Matt, 85, Israeli major-general.
- Vincent Mayers, 79, Guyanese cricketer.
- Joe Palumbo, 84, American football player (Virginia Cavaliers), member of College Football Hall of Fame.
- Brenda Reneau, 59, American politician, natural causes.
- Cynthia Eagle Russett, 76, American historian, multiple myeloma.
- Gerald J. Spitz, 72, American politician, sarcoidosis.
- David Vestal, 89, American photographer, educator, and author.
- Colin Wilson, 82, English writer.

=== 6 ===
- Georges Baal, 75, Hungarian psychoanalyst, director, actor, theater therapist and professor, heart attack.
- Eddie Britt, 87, Australian politician, member of the New South Wales Legislative Assembly for Willoughby (1978–1981).
- Jean-Pierre Desthuilliers, 74, French poet.
- Robert Ellis, 87, American mathematician, specializing in topological dynamics.
- Philippe Favre, 51, Swiss racing driver, skiing accident.
- Hakem Al-Fayez, Jordanian politician.
- Maurice Griffe, 92, French screenwriter.
- Louis Jacobson, 95, Irish cricketer.
- Tom Krause, 79, Finnish opera singer.
- Gail Collins Pappalardi, 72, American artist and songwriter (Strange Brew).
- Peeter Mudist, 71, Estonian painter.
- Nya Quesada, 94, Argentine actress.
- Alan Robinson, 65, Canadian politician.
- Stan Tracey, 86, British jazz pianist.
- M. K. Turk, 71, American college basketball coach (Southern Miss).
- Louis Waldon, 78, American actor (Lonesome Cowboys, Blue Movie, Flesh), stroke.
- Kate Williamson, 82, American actress (Ellen, Disclosure, Dahmer).

=== 7 ===
- Vinay Apte, 62, Indian actor.
- Juan Carlos Argeñal, 43, Honduran journalist, shot.
- Sir Hugh Bidwell, 79, British businessman, Lord Mayor of London (1990).
- Alan Bridges, 86, English film and television director (The Shooting Party).
- Jack Fishman, 83, American pharmaceutical researcher.
- John Idzik, 85, American football player and coach.
- Nadezhda Ilyina, 64, Russian Soviet Olympic bronze-medalist athlete (1976), traffic collision.
- Eero Kolehmainen, 95, Finnish Olympic silver-medalist cross country skier (1952).
- Józef Kowalski, 113, Polish soldier, second-to-last surviving veteran of the Polish–Soviet War.
- Jacob Matlala, 51, South African WBO flyweight and light flyweight champion boxer (1993, 1995).
- Édouard Molinaro, 85, French film director and screenwriter (La Cage aux Folles).
- Allen Rosenberg, 82, American Olympic rowing coach.
- Esther Streit-Wurzel, 81, Israeli author.
- Thomas B. Spain, 85, American jurist, member of the Supreme Court of Kentucky (1991–1995).
- Dharmavarapu Subramanyam, 53, Indian comic actor.
- Kei Suma, 78, Japanese actor, liver cancer.
- Michael Vetter, 70, German composer and novelist.
- Chick Willis, 79, American blues singer, cancer.

=== 8 ===
- Orlando Álvarez, 78, Chilean lawyer and writer, Judge of the Supreme Court (1998–2009).
- Leonid Baranovskyi, 60, Ukrainian Soviet footballer (Chornomorets).
- Sir John Cornforth, 96, Australian-British chemist, laureate of the Nobel Prize (1975).
- Wanda Ewing, 43, American artist, small cell lung cancer.
- Hung Sin Nui, 88, Chinese Cantonese opera singer and actress.
- Jwala, 4, British Thoroughbred racehorse, euthanised.
- Mado Maurin, 98, French actress and comedian.
- Maurice J. McCauley, 90, American teacher and politician, Member of the Minnesota House of Representatives.
- José Mercado, 75, Mexican Olympic cyclist.
- Don Mitchell, 70, American actor (Ironside, I Dream of Jeannie, CHiPs), natural causes.
- Donn Robins, 79, Australian cricketer (South Australia).
- Luis Saavedra, 78, Spanish footballer (Tenerife).
- Ernest Sauter, 85, German composer.
- Sándor Szokolay, 82, Hungarian composer and professor.
- Edward Williams, 92, English composer (Life on Earth).
- Richard S. Williamson, 64, American lawyer and diplomat, United States ambassador to the United Nations for Special Political Affairs, cerebral hemorrhage.

=== 9 ===
- Dame Florence Baron, 61, British jurist, cancer.
- Kees Brusse, 88, Dutch actor and film director.
- Hristu Cândroveanu, 85, Romanian editor, literary critic and writer.
- Shane del Rosario, 30, American mixed martial artist and kickboxer, complications from cardiac arrest.
- Pat Flaherty, 89, Australian politician, member of the New South Wales Legislative Assembly for Granville (1962–1984).
- Alberto Foguelman, 90, Argentine chess master.
- John Gabbert, 104, American judge, California Appellate Court (1970–1974) and Superior Court (1949–1970).
- Herbert P. Gleason, 85, American lawyer, melanoma.
- Norman Harding, 84, British trade unionist and political activist.
- Joe Black Hayes, 98, American football player (Tennessee Volunteers).
- Barbara Hesse-Bukowska, 83, Polish classical pianist.
- Takeshi Miura, 75, Japanese actor, pneumonia.
- Eleanor Parker, 91, American actress (The Sound of Music, Detective Story, Caged), pneumonia.
- Lloyd Pye, 67, American author and paranormal researcher.
- Shiva Regmi, 49, Nepali film director, kidney failure.
- María Eugenia Rubio, 80, Mexican singer and actress.
- Avtandil Tskitishvili, 63, Georgian general, Chief of General Staff (1992–1993).
- Peter Urban, 72, German translator.
- Jacq Firmin Vogelaar, 69, Dutch writer.
- Thomson M. Whitin, 90, American economist.
- John Wilbur, 70, American football player (Dallas Cowboys, Los Angeles Rams, Washington Redskins), chronic traumatic encephalopathy.

=== 10 ===
- Mary Allitt, 80, Australian cricketer.
- Jimmy Amadie, 76, American jazz musician.
- Maurice Benoit, 81, Canadian Olympic silver medallist ice hockey player (1960), (Dayton Gems).
- The Child of Lov, 26, Belgian-born Dutch pop musician, complications from surgery.
- Alan Coleman, 76, English-born Australian television director and producer (The Young Doctors, Neighbours).
- John Didion, 66, American football player (Washington Redskins, New Orleans Saints).
- Peter Drummond, 82, Australian politician, member of the Australian House of Representatives for Forrest (1972–1987).
- Skeets Gallacher, 88, British boxer.
- Jim Hall, 83, American jazz guitarist, composer and arranger.
- Don Lund, 90, American baseball player (Detroit Tigers).
- William L. Mallory Sr., 82, American politician, member of the Ohio House of Representatives (1967–1994) and House Majority Leader (1974–1994).
- Herbert J. McChrystal, 89, American army major general.
- Pete Naton, 82, American baseball player (Pittsburgh Pirates).
- Rossana Podestà, 79, Italian actress (Helen of Troy).
- Ravella Venkatarama Rao, 86, Indian writer.
- David Thurston, 95, American aircraft designer.
- Srikantadatta Narasimharaja Wadiyar, 60, Indian politician, leader of Mysore Kingdom and Wadiyar dynasty (since 1974), heart attack.

=== 11 ===
- Nadir Afonso, 93, Portuguese geometric abstractionist painter.
- Kate Barry, 46, British photographer, fall.
- Barbara Branden, 84, Canadian biographer, lung infection.
- George H. Buck Jr., 84, American music industry executive.
- Regina Derieva, 64, Russian poet.
- Frederick Fox, 82, Australian-born British milliner.
- Loretta Fuddy, 65, American health official, director of the Hawaii Department of Health (since 2011), Mayor of Kalawao County (since 2011), irregular heartbeat after a plane crash.
- Javier Jáuregui, 40, Mexican former IBF world lightweight champion boxer, stroke.
- Patrick Kavanagh, 90, British police officer, Deputy Commissioner of Police of the Metropolis (1977–1983).
- Paul Liu Jinghe, 92, Chinese Roman Catholic Bishop.
- Luigi Menti, 79, Italian footballer.
- Garry Robbins, 56, Canadian professional wrestler and actor (Wrong Turn, The Love Guru, Narc), heart attack.
- Musa Shariefi, 71, Indian Islamic religious scholar.
- Master Sridhar, 60, Indian film actor, heart attack.

=== 12 ===
- Molly Allott, 95, British Women's Royal Air Force officer.
- Chabua Amirejibi, 92, Georgian writer.
- Stephen Bruce, 59, South African cricketer.
- Jim Burton, 64, American baseball player (Boston Red Sox).
- Devere Christensen, 95, American water polo player.
- Bernard Conlan, 90, British politician, MP for Gateshead East (1964–1987).
- Krisztina Dobos, 64, Hungarian politician and economist.
- Ron Goodwin, 72, American football player.
- Jang Song-thaek, 67, North Korean politician, Vice-Chairman of the National Defence Commission (2010–2013), executed.
- David Jones, 73, English footballer (Millwall).
- Zbigniew Karkowski, 55, Polish composer, pancreatic cancer.
- Tom Laughlin, 82, American actor (Billy Jack), complications from pneumonia.
- Maria Lidka, 99, German-born British violinist.
- Mac McGarry, 87, American television quiz show host (It's Academic), pneumonia.
- Angelo Menon, 94, Italian cyclist.
- Abdul Quader Molla, 65, Bangladeshi politician, execution by hanging.
- Lee Raymond, 59, American stock car racing driver, cancer.
- Leo Sachs, 89, Israeli molecular biologist.
- Ezra Sellers, 45, American IBO cruiserweight champion boxer (2001–2002), heart failure.
- Audrey Totter, 95, American actress (The Postman Always Rings Twice; Medical Center), stroke.
- Charles M. Vest, 72, American academic, President of the Massachusetts Institute of Technology (1990–2004), pancreatic cancer.
- Séry Wawa, 70, Ivorian footballer (Africa Sports, national team).
- Rae Woodland, 91, British soprano.

=== 13 ===
- Mohammed Ali al-Ahwal, 63, Yemeni banker and diplomat.
- Marcel Cellier, 88, Swiss organist and musicologist.
- Daniel Escobar, 49, American actor (Lizzie McGuire, Dharma & Greg, Blow), complications of diabetes.
- Marina Gordon, 96, Belarusian-born American singer and coloratura soprano.
- Vivian Kellogg, 91, American AAGPBL baseball player (Fort Wayne Daisies).
- Kim Kuk-tae, 89, North Korean politician and party secretary, heart failure.
- Stan Leadbetter, 76, English first-class cricketer.
- Grace Lenczyk, 86, American amateur golfer.
- Harvey Littleton, 91, American glass artist.
- Wallace T. MacCaffrey, 93, American historian.
- Italo Mazzacurati, 81, Italian cyclist.
- Claudio Nasco, 37, Cuban journalist and newscaster, stabbed.
- Hugh Nissenson, 80, American novelist.
- Zafer Önen, 92, Turkish film actor, heart failure.
- Andrew Plain, 60, Australian sound editor (The Truman Show, Babe, Knowing), melanoma.
- Wyn Roberts, Baron Roberts of Conwy, 83, Welsh politician, MP for Conwy (1970–1997).
- James Schroder, 95, Canadian politician, MP for Guelph (1980–1984).
- Thad Spencer, 70, American heavyweight boxer.
- Horst Tomayer, 75, German poet, columnist, and actor, complications from cancer.

=== 14 ===
- Janet Abu-Lughod, 85, American sociologist.
- Lou Angeli, 62, American writer and filmmaker, subarachnoid hemorrhage.
- G. W. S. Barrow, 89, British historian.
- Janet Dailey, 69, American romance writer, complications of heart surgery.
- Judi Hofer, 73, American business executive.
- C. N. Karunakaran, 73, Indian painter.
- Teoman Koman, 77, Turkish army general.
- Junji Kunishige, 71, Japanese scholar of American literature, hepatocellular carcinoma.
- Dennis Lindley, 90, British statistician.
- Frank Lobdell, 92, American painter.
- Frank Maznicki, 93, American football player (Chicago Bears, Boston Yanks).
- René Million, 79, French Olympic swimmer.
- John O. Norrman, 92, Swedish geographer and geomorphologist.
- Peter O'Toole, 81, British-Irish actor (Lawrence of Arabia, The Lion in Winter, Troy), BAFTA winner (1963).
- Neil Robson, 85, Australian politician.
- France Roche, 92, French actress.
- George Rodrigue, 69, American painter, lung cancer.
- Bill Troup, 62, American football player (Baltimore Colts, Green Bay Packers).

=== 15 ===
- Sandeep Acharya, 29, Indian singer.
- Harold Camping, 92, American evangelist (Family Radio) and alleged doomsday predictor, complications from a fall.
- Frank Meidell Falch, 93, Norwegian media director.
- Joan Fontaine, 96, British-American actress (Rebecca, Suspicion, Ivanhoe), Oscar winner (1942).
- Helmar Frank, 80, German mathematician.
- Gennaro Langella, 74, American mobster.
- Viking Mestad, 83, Norwegian banker and politician.
- Dyron Nix, 46, American basketball player (Indiana Pacers), pneumonia.
- Sis Ram Ola, 86, Indian politician, Minister of Labour and Employment (2004, since 2013), Minister of Mines (2004–2009).
- Valentin Pashin, 76, Russian naval constructor, Hero of the Russian Federation.
- Yevgeny Yatsinenko, 88, Russian Soviet Olympic sprint canoer (1956).

=== 16 ===
- James Isbell Armstrong, 94, American academic, President of Middlebury College (1963–1975).
- Arnoldo Castro, 74, Mexican baseball player.
- Pat Crowley, 80, Irish fashion designer.
- James Flint, 100, British Royal Air Force officer.
- Stuart Hilborn, 96, Canadian automotive engineer.
- Derek Hornby, 83, British business executive.
- Gillis MacGill, 85, American fashion model.
- Conn McCluskey, 99, Irish civil rights activist.
- Ray Price, 87, American singer ("Heartaches by the Number", "For the Good Times"), pancreatic cancer.
- Madhusudan Rege, 89, Indian cricketer (Maharashtra).
- Marta Russell, 62, American writer and disability rights activist.
- Lolita Sevilla, 78, Spanish actress and singer.
- Michiaki Takahashi, 85, Japanese virologist (chickenpox vaccine), heart failure.
- Uthradom Thirunal Marthanda Varma, 91, Indian titular Maharaja of Travancore (since 1991), heart failure.
- Arie Vermeer, 91, Dutch footballer.
- Zvi Yanai, 78, Israeli publicist and philosopher.

=== 17 ===
- Alfred Bates, 69, British politician, MP for Bebington and Ellesmere Port (1974–1979).
- Richard Britnell, 69, British historian.
- Fred Bruemmer, 84, Canadian nature photographer.
- Ārvaldis Andrejs Brumanis, 87, Latvian Roman Catholic prelate, Bishop of Liepāja (1995–2001).
- Ricardo María Carles Gordó, 87, Spanish Catholic cardinal, Archbishop of Barcelona (1990–2004).
- Kelly Clark, 56, American attorney, cancer.
- Rudolf Filkus, 86, Slovak politician.
- Richard Heffner, 88, American historian and television host (The Open Mind), cerebral hemorrhage.
- Azean Irdawaty, 63, Malaysian actress, liver failure.
- Tetsurō Kashibuchi, 63, Japanese musician, composer (Tsuribaka Nisshi), and producer (Yukiko Okada), esophageal cancer.
- Frank Magleby, 85, American painter and educator.
- Janet Rowley, 88, American cancer researcher, complications of ovarian cancer.
- Paul Ryan, 70, American video artist and communications theorist.
- Eyad al-Sarraj, 70, Palestinian human rights campaigner, leukemia.
- Frank Sheehan, 80, Canadian politician, member of the Legislative Assembly of Ontario for Lincoln (1995–1999), cancer.
- Conny van Rietschoten, 87, Dutch yacht racer.

=== 18 ===
- Ronnie Biggs, 84, English criminal (Great Train Robbery) and fugitive.
- Harry Boland, 88, Irish Olympic basketball player (1948).
- Sir Christopher Curwen, 84, British Head of the Secret Intelligence Service (1985–1989).
- William T. Greenough, 69, American educator, Lewy body dementia.
- Jerome Grossman, 96, American political activist.
- Ken Hutcherson, 61, American football player and anti-gay activist, prostate cancer.
- Gonzalo Inzunza Inzunza, 42, Mexican drug lord and Sinaloa Cartel leader, shot.
- Boyuk Jeddikar, 84, Iranian footballer (Esteghlal F.C., national team), Alzheimer's disease.
- Martin Koeman, 75, Dutch footballer, heart failure.
- Larry Lujack, 73, American disc jockey, esophageal cancer.
- Graham Mackay, 64, South African businessman (SABMiller).
- Konstantin Melgunov, 87, Russian Olympic sailor.
- Titus Munteanu, 72, Romanian television producer (TVR), director and filmmaker, respiratory disease.
- Donald Roe Ross, 91, American federal judge.
- Brunon Synak, 70, Polish sociologist and politician.
- Paul Torday, 67, British author.
- Wade Walker, 90, American football player, coach, and college athletics administrator.

=== 19 ===
- Winton Dean, 97, English musicologist.
- Herb Geller, 85, American jazz saxophonist, pneumonia.
- Morton J. Gold, 96, American Air Force brigadier general.
- Al Goldstein, 77, American publisher and pornographer, renal failure.
- Jesús Gutiérrez Rebollo, 79, Mexican general and drug trafficker, brain cancer.
- Arnošt Hložek, 84, Slovak football coach and player.
- Marty Hornstein, 76, American film producer (Star Trek: First Contact, Along Came a Spider).
- Ralph Howard, 82, Australian politician, member of the Victorian Legislative Council (1976–1982).
- Hideo Kanaya, 68, Japanese motorcycle racer.
- Leon Kuhn, 59, British political cartoonist.
- Nae Lăzărescu, 72, Romanian actor and comedian, chronic liver disease.
- Krzysztof Marcinkowski, 53, Polish footballer (Lech Poznan).
- Pedro Septién, 97, Mexican sports broadcaster, pneumonia.
- Olive Smuts-Kennedy, 88, New Zealand politician.
- Ružica Sokić, 79, Serbian actress, Alzheimer's disease.
- Ned Vizzini, 32, American novelist (It's Kind of a Funny Story), suicide by jumping.
- Günther Ziegler, 80, German Olympic cyclist.

=== 20 ===
- Amand Audaire, 89, French cyclist.
- Pyotr Bolotnikov, 83, Soviet Olympic champion athlete (1960).
- Harji Ram Burdak, 82, Indian politician.
- Tibor Czinkán, 84, Hungarian basketball player.
- Yuri Dubinin, 83, Russian diplomat, Ambassador to the United States (1986–1990).
- Marie Fleming, 59, Irish campaigner for assisted suicide, multiple sclerosis.
- Barbara Heslop, 88, New Zealand immunologist.
- Khaled Khan, 55, Bangladeshi actor, motor neuron disease.
- Lord Infamous, 40, American rapper (Three 6 Mafia), heart attack.
- Gyula Maár, 79, Hungarian film director.
- Didi Menosi, 85, Israeli dramatist, journalist and songwriter, Parkinson's disease.
- Nelly Omar, 102, Argentine actress and singer, cardiac arrest.
- Masafumi Ōura, 44, Japanese volleyball player (national team), stomach cancer.
- David Richards, 57, British record producer (Queen, Iggy Pop).
- Reginaldo Rossi, 69, Brazilian singer-songwriter, lung cancer.
- Vivian St. John, 63, American professional wrestler.
- Jeff Shannon, 52, American film critic and writer (The Seattle Times), pneumonia.
- Syeda Zohra Tajuddin, 80, Bangladeshi politician.

=== 21 ===
- Trigger Alpert, 97, American jazz double-bassist (Glenn Miller band).
- Ahmed Asmat Abdel-Meguid, 89, Egyptian diplomat.
- Eli Beeding, 85, American scientist and test pilot.
- Edgar Bronfman Sr., 84, Canadian businessman (Seagram) and activist for Jewish and Israeli causes.
- Bethine Clark Church, 90, American political activist.
- David Coleman, 87, British television sports commentator and presenter.
- Craig Cotton, 66, American football tight end.
- Treffor Davies, 75, British cricketer (Worcestershire).
- Lars Edlund, 91, Swedish composer and organist.
- John Eisenhower, 91, American historian and diplomat, Ambassador to Belgium (1969–1971).
- Peter Geach, 97, British philosopher.
- Charles Grant Gordon, 86, Scottish whisky distiller, pneumonia.
- Richard Hart, 96, Jamaican historian and politician.
- Rodolfo P. Hernández, 82, American soldier, recipient of the Medal of Honor (1952).
- Ina Scot, 24, Swedish racehorse, winner of Prix d'Amérique (1995), euthanized.
- Björn J:son Lindh, 69, Swedish musician and composer, brain tumor.
- Bernard Henry McGinn, 56, Irish republican and IRA member, convicted of conspiracy to murder and firearms possession. (body discovered on this date)
- Bronzell Miller, 42, American football player and actor (Bringing Down the House, Mr. 3000), multiple myeloma.
- El Perlo de Triana, 87, Spanish singer and poet.
- Aristóteles Picho, 56, Peruvian actor, director and drama teacher, heart attack.
- Lentxu Rubial, 68, Spanish politician, Senator (2004–2011).
- Geoff Stirling, 92, Canadian businessman (CJON-DT, CHOZ-FM) and publisher (Newfoundland Herald).
- Kazutami Watanabe, 81, Japanese scholar of French literature, sepsis.
- Woon Sui Kut, 84, Singaporean sports official.

=== 22 ===
- Muriel Abdurahman, 75, Canadian politician, member of the Legislative Assembly of Alberta for Clover Bar-Fort Saskatchewan (1993–1997).
- Pran Chopra, 92, Indian journalist and newspaper editor (The Statesman).
- Diomedes Díaz, 56, Colombian vallenato musician, heart attack.
- Shem Downey, 91, Irish hurler (Kilkenny).·
- R. A. Foakes, 90, British author and Shakespearean scholar.
- John Grefe, 66, American chess player, liver cancer.
- Ed Herrmann, 67, American baseball player (Chicago White Sox), prostate cancer.
- Hans Hækkerup, 68, Danish politician, Defence Minister (1993–2000), MP (1979–2001), multiple system atrophy.
- Leonard Jackson, 85, American stage, film, and television actor, Alzheimer's disease.
- Anton Mackowiak, 91, German Olympic wrestler.
- Keith McGowan, 70, Australian radio presenter (3AW), stroke.
- Oscar Peer, 85, Swiss writer.
- Lázaro Rivas, 38, Cuban Olympic silver medallist wrestler (2000).
- William Rosales, 59, Puerto Rican politician, Mayor of Camuy (1989–2002).
- Antti Sivonen, 85, Finnish Olympic skier.
- Bill Tremel, 84, American baseball player (Chicago Cubs).
- Marco Zappia, 76, American television editor (Home Improvement, All in the Family, Who's the Boss?).

=== 23 ===
- Stan Brooks, 86, American radio broadcaster (WINS).
- Alan Burns, 83, English author.
- Rick Cassidy, 70, American pornographic actor and bodybuilder.
- Chryssa, 79, Greek-American artist.
- Inis L. Claude, 91, American political scientist.
- Addison Cresswell, 53, British comedy agent and manager, heart attack.
- Andrew Hughes, English musicologist.
- Mikhail Kalashnikov, 94, Russian weapons designer (AK-47, AK-74).
- Dorothy Kuya, 81, British human rights activist.
- Yusef Lateef, 93, American Grammy Award-winning saxophonist (Yusef Lateef's Little Symphony).
- Juris Lauciņš, 56, Latvian actor, throat cancer.
- Ricky Lawson, 59, American drummer (Michael Jackson, Phil Collins), brain aneurysm.
- Neil McLaughlin, 65, Irish Olympic boxer.
- José Ortiz, 81, Spanish comics artist (Hombre, Tex Willer).
- András Pándy, 86, Hungarian-born Belgian serial killer, natural causes.
- Chuck Patterson, 68, American actor (Law & Order), heart attack.
- Raymond Paul, 85, British Olympic fencer (1952, 1956).
- Jeff Pollack, 54, American director and producer (Booty Call, The Fresh Prince of Bel-Air), natural causes.
- Ted Richmond, 103, American film producer (Papillon).
- Vito Rizzuto, 67, Canadian mafia leader, pneumonia.
- Viktor Sarianidi, 84, Russian archaeologist.
- G. S. Shivarudrappa, 87, Indian Kannada-language poet.
- Summer Bird, 7, American Thoroughbred racehorse, colic.
- Francisco Manuel Vieira, 88, Brazilian Roman Catholic prelate, Bishop of Osasco (1989–2002).
- Robert W. Wilson, 86, American multimillionaire philanthropist, suicide by jumping.

=== 24 ===
- Rex Armistead, 83, American private detective and police officer (Arkansas Project).
- Eric Auld, 82, Scottish artist.
- Frédéric Back, 89, Canadian animator (Crac, The Man Who Planted Trees), cancer.
- Ian Barbour, 90, American scholar and author, stroke.
- Sir Michael Butler, 86, British diplomat, Permanent Representative to the European Economic Community (1979–1985).
- Thomas Ludlow Chrystie II, 80, American banker.
- Germán Coppini, 52, Spanish pop musician and singer (Siniestro Total, Golpes Bajos), hepatic cancer.
- André Dreiding, 94, Swiss chemist.
- Gunnar Ericsson, 94, Swedish politician and sports official.
- Patrick Etolu, 78, Ugandan Olympic high jumper.
- Soane Lilo Foliaki, 80, Tongan Roman Catholic prelate, Bishop of Tonga (1994–2008).
- John M. Goldman, 75, British medical scientist.
- Jakob Sigurd Holmgard, 84, Norwegian farmer and politician.
- Stuart Jakeman, 70, English cricketer (Northants).
- Raino Koskenkorva, 87, Finnish Olympic cyclist.
- Fleming Lee, 79, American author.
- Allan McKeown, 67, British film producer (Tracey Takes On...), prostate cancer.
- Ron Noades, 76, British football chairman (Crystal Palace), lung cancer.
- Helga M. Novak, 78, German-Icelandic writer.
- Walter Oi, 84, American economist.
- Hansjörg Reichel, 91, Austrian Olympic ice hockey player.
- Jean Rustin, 85, French painter.
- Valter Santos, 59, Brazilian actor, heart attack.
- Reginald Arthur Shooter, 97, British microbiologist.
- Serghei Stroenco, 46, Moldovan football player (national team) and manager.
- Edward Williams, 88, English cricketer.

=== 25 ===
- Don Adams, 66, American basketball player.
- Kaj Backlund, 68, Finnish jazz trumpeter (UMO Jazz Orchestra).
- Anthony J. Bryant, 52, American author.
- Richard F. Edlich, 74, American plastic surgeon.
- Birger Gerhardsson, 87, Swedish Biblical scholar.
- Luis Humberto Gómez Gallo, 51, Colombian industrial engineer, Senator (1994–2008), heart attack.
- Wayne Harrison, 46, English footballer (Liverpool).
- David R. Harris, 83, British geographer, anthropologist and archaeologist.
- Mike Hegan, 71, American baseball player (Milwaukee Brewers, New York Yankees) and announcer (Cleveland Indians), heart failure.
- Jorge Loring Miró, 92, Spanish Jesuit priest, stroke.
- Boris Magasanik, 94, American microbiologist.
- Andy Malcolm, 80, English footballer (West Ham United).
- Mel Mathay, 80, Filipino politician, Mayor of Quezon City (1992–2001), heart attack.
- Linda McCullough Thew, 95, British author.
- John Rutherford, 78, English cricketer.
- Cliff Salmond, 85, Canadian Olympic athlete.
- Viktor Savelyev, 85, Russian surgeon, Hero of Socialist Labor, recipient of the Demidov Prize in Medicine (2002).
- Adnan Şenses, 78, Turkish musician and actor, stomach cancer.
- Wilbur Thompson, 92, American Olympic champion shot putter (1948).
- Val Joe Walker, 83, American football player (Green Bay Packers).
- Art Weiner, 87, American football player.
- Slim Williamson, 86, American recording executive.

=== 26 ===
- Malena Alvarado, 59, Venezuelan actress, complications during surgery.
- Albino Aroso, 90, Portuguese doctor and politician.
- Paul Blair, 69, American baseball player (Baltimore Orioles, New York Yankees), heart attack.
- Gerardo Bönnhoff, 87, German-born Argentine athlete.
- E. Otis Charles, 87, American clergyman and activist, Episcopal Bishop of Utah (1971–1993).
- Dinu Cocea, 84, Romanian director and screenwriter, heart failure.
- Dr. Tangalanga, 97, Argentine comedian.
- Marta Eggerth, 101, Hungarian-born American singer and actress.
- Brian Glüss, 83, British statistician, mathematician, systems engineer and author.
- Bruce Hopkins, 89, Australian rugby league footballer.
- Theo Lalleman, 67, Dutch writer.
- Herbert F. Travers Jr., 85, American attorney and judge.
- Sally Vincent, 76, British journalist.
- Harold Whitaker, 93, British animator (Animal Farm, Heavy Metal).

=== 27 ===
- Richard Ambler, 80, British chemist.
- Carter Camp, 72, American activist, chair of the American Indian Movement (1973).
- Gonzalo Carrasco, 78, Chilean footballer.
- Mohamad Chatah, 62, Lebanese politician, Minister of Finance (2008–2009), Ambassador to the United States (1997–2000), car bomb.
- Abu Lais Md. Mubin Chowdhury, 71–72, Bangladeshi politician, heart attack.
- Patrick Crowby, 55, Ni-Vanuatu politician, Interior Minister (2008, 2011, 2013).
- Alexander Lamb Cullen, 93, British electrical engineer.
- Gianna D'Angelo, 84, American opera singer.
- Boyd Lee Dunlop, 87, American jazz pianist.
- Rollo Gebhard, 92, German circumnavigator and author.
- Peter Hall, 83, British Anglican bishop, Bishop of Woolwich in the Diocese of Southwark, England (1984–1996).
- Peter John Harding, 73, British Royal Air Force officer, Defence Services Secretary (1994–1998).
- John Matheson, 96, Canadian lawyer, judge and politician, MP for Leeds (1961–1968).
- Åke Nordin, 77, Swedish entrepreneur, founder of Fjällräven outdoor equipment.
- Gunn Olsen, 61, Norwegian politician. MP for Telemark (1997–2013), cancer.
- Elvira Quintillá, 85, Spanish actress.
- Alan Richards, 91, New Zealand cricketer.
- Farooq Sheikh, 65, Indian actor, heart attack.
- Jonathan Stevens, 36, British medical researcher, Parkinson's disease.
- Ian B. Tanner, 87, Australian Presbyterian minister.
- Keegan Taylor, 29, Zimbabwean cricketer (Manicaland), heart failure.
- Fernando Ureña Rib, 62, Dominican painter.

=== 28 ===
- Halton Arp, 86, American astronomer.
- Jack S. Blanton, 86, American businessman and philanthropist.
- Esther Borja, 100, Cuban singer.
- Robert Boscawen, 90, British politician, MP for Wells (1970–1983), Somerton and Frome (1983–1992).
- Laurent Chappis, 98, French architect and town planner.
- Aníbal Delgado Fiallos, 77, Honduran politician.
- Sheila Guyse, 88, American actress and singer, Alzheimer's disease.
- Andrew Jacobs Jr., 81, American politician, member of the House of Representatives from Indiana (1965–1973, 1975–1997).
- George Jacobs, 86, American memoirist and valet.
- Margrit Kennedy, 74, German architect and academic.
- Kazuyoshi Kino, 91, Japanese Buddhist scholar, pneumonia.
- Alfred Marshall, 94, American clothing retailer, founder of Marshalls.
- Eleanor Montgomery, 67, American Olympic high jumper.
- Joseph Ruskin, 89, American actor (The Magnificent Seven, The Scorpion King, Alias).
- Mair Russell-Jones, 96, Welsh codebreaker.
- Yosef Shapira, 87, Israeli politician, minister without portfolio (1984–1988).
- Harold Simmons, 82, American businessman and philanthropist.
- Ilya Tsymbalar, 44, Ukrainian-born Russian footballer, Footballer of the Year in Russia (1995), heart disease.

=== 29 ===
- Alevtina Aparina, 72, Russian politician.
- Richard Coar, 92, American aerospace engineer.
- Paul Comstive, 52, English footballer, heart attack.
- John W. V. Cordice, 94, American doctor and surgeon, natural causes.
- Benjamin Curtis, 35, American rock musician (Tripping Daisy, Secret Machines, School of Seven Bells), lymphoma.
- Connie Dierking, 77, American basketball player (Philadelphia 76ers, Cincinnati Royals).
- Andy Granatelli, 90, American motorsport promoter and businessman, CEO of STP, heart failure.
- C. T. Hsia, 92, Chinese literary critic and academic.
- Wojciech Kilar, 81, Polish classical and film composer (Bram Stoker's Dracula, The Pianist, We Own the Night), brain tumor.
- Besik Kudukhov, 27, Russian Olympic wrestler (2008, 2012), traffic collision.
- Henri Lazarof, 81, Bulgarian composer, Alzheimer's disease.
- Kay Mander, 98, British film director and shooting continuity specialist.
- Jagadish Mohanty, 62, Indian Oriya language writer, hit by train.
- Mike O'Connor, 67, American journalists' advocate, heart attack.
- William Overstreet Jr., 92, American WWII flying ace.
- Khushi Ram, 77, Indian basketball player.
- Ari Romero, 62, Mexican professional wrestler, liver cancer.
- Armando Villegas, 87, Peruvian-Colombian painter.
- Mary Wibberley, 79, British novelist.

=== 30 ===
- Akeem Adams, 22, Trinidadian footballer, stroke.
- Katja Andy, 106, German-born American classical pianist.
- Martin Berkofsky, 70, American classical pianist, cancer.
- W. Harrison Daniel, 91, American author and history professor.
- John Dominis, 92, American photojournalist, complications from heart attack.
- Kenneth C. Edelin, 74, American physician and patient rights advocate.
- Charlie Hill, 62, American Oneida-Mohawk-Cree comedian, lymphoma.
- Sjoerd Huisman, 27, Dutch long distance ice-skater, cardiac arrest.
- Kinnaird R. McKee, 84, American United States Navy admiral.
- José María Maguregui, 79, Spanish football player (Athletic Bilbao) and coach (Racing de Santander).
- Eero Mäntyranta, 76, Finnish Olympic champion (1960, 1964) cross-country skier.
- Tito Mora, 73, Spanish pop singer, pulmonary illness.
- Gerald Mortimer, 77, British author and sports journalist (Derby Telegraph).
- G. Nammalvar, 75, Indian agronomist and sustainability activist, cardiac arrest.
- Eiichi Ohtaki, 65, Japanese musician (Happy End), choking.
- Johnny Orr, 86, American basketball player and coach (University of Michigan, Iowa State University), complications of a head injury from fall.
- Merle Phillips, 85, American politician from Pennsylvania.
- Paul Sally, 80, American mathematics professor.
- Jaime Quijandría Salmón, 70, Peruvian economist and politician, Minister of Energy (2001–2003, 2004), Minister of Economy (2003–2004), pulmonary fibrosis.
- Haakon Sandberg, 89, Norwegian film director.
- Menan Schriewer, 79, American football player.
- Lakshmi Shankar, 87, Indian classical vocalist.
- Ayhan Sökmen, 84, Turkish composer and physician.
- Jan Steyn, 85, South African judge, Supreme Court Justice (1964–1977).
- Ibrahima Sylla, 57, Ivorian record producer.
- Geoffrey Wheeler, 83, British broadcaster (Songs of Praise, Top of the Form, Winner Takes All).
- Larry Yaji, 87, American baseball player (Nishitetsu Lions).

=== 31 ===
- Antonio Allocca, 76, Italian actor.
- James Avery, 68, American actor (The Fresh Prince of Bel Air, Teenage Mutant Ninja Turtles, The Closer), complications from surgery.
- Roberto Ciotti, 60, Italian bluesman and composer (Marrakech Express).
- Puccio Corona, 71, Italian journalist.
- Jim Coutts, 75, Canadian lawyer, businessman and advisor to two prime ministers, cancer.
- John Fortune, 74, British comedian (Bremner, Bird and Fortune) and actor (Match Point), leukaemia.
- Silva Golde, 58, Latvian politician and educator.
- Joaquim Gonçalves, 77, Portuguese Roman Catholic prelate, Bishop of Vila Real (1991–2011).
- Bob Grant, 84, American radio talk show host.
- Hans Hellbrand, 88, Swedish Olympic water polo player.
- Sigrid Kahle, 85, French-born Swedish journalist and writer.
- Patrick Karegeya, 53, Rwandan dissident, Director-General (External Intelligence) of the Defence Force (1994–2004), strangulation.
- Irina Korschunow, 88, German writer.
- Hardev Singh Kular, 83, Kenyan Olympic hockey player.
- Hermann Müller, 78, German politician, Mayor of Idstein (1978–2002).
- T. C. Narendran, 69, Indian taxonomist, heart attack.
- Al Porcino, 88, American jazz trumpeter, fall.
- Ljubomir Tadić, 88, Serbian academic.
- Lidiya Vertinskaya, 90, Russian actress.
- Werner Wittig, 83, German painter and printmaker.
