= Raymond Weeks (disambiguation) =

Raymond Weeks may refer to:

- Ray Weeks (30 April 1930 – 2 December 2013), English cricketer
- Raymond Weeks (1863–1954), British art historian and collector
- Raymond Weeks (1909-1985), World War II Veteran known for the establishment of Veterans Day in the United States
