= Magleby =

Magleby may refer to:

- Magleby (surname)
- Magleby Church, a church in the village of Magleby in the east of Møn, Denmark

== See also ==
- Store Magleby, a Danish town
