= Corpus Christi (2014 film) =

2014 film

- Film poster
- Directed by: César Bolívar
- Written by: Carlos Tabares
- Produced by: Alejandro León
- Starring: Carlos Cruz; Jariana Armas; Marcos Moreno
- Music by: Rúper Vásquez; La Banda Repikandáo’
- Production company: Villa del Cine
- Release date: June 13, 2014 (Venezuela)
- Running time: 100 minutes
- Country: Venezuela
- Language: Spanish

Corpus Christi, is a 2014 Venezuelan action film directed by César Bolívar and written by Carlos Tabares.

Was the last movie of the director before his dead in 2024.

== Plot ==
Shortly before the celebration of the Festival, the leader of the brotherhood of Devils dancing appears dead. Milton Ventura, police and brother of the deceased, returns to the village, after 30 years of absence, to clarify the case. Confronting the interests that oppose him and the demons of their past, Milton discovers that his brother's death involves a painful expose truth.

== Cast ==
- Carlos Cruz as Milton Ventura
  - Guillermo Cruz as Young Milton
- Jariana Armas as Aurora Morell
- Marcos Moreno as Miguel Ventura
- Mirtha Borges as Mamá Toña
- Pedro Laya as Abel Ventura
- Mayra Africano as Lucrecia de Ventura
- Framk Maneiro as Urbano Morell
- Julio César Castro as Crescencio Peralta
- Malena Alvarado as Mireya de Peralta
- Alexander Solórzano as Comisario Roberto
- Alberto Alifa
- Luigi Scimama
- Manuel Salazar
- Malena Alvarado
- Rodolfo Drago
- Eduardo Gadea-Perez
