= Kunishige =

- Gender: Male

Origin
- Origin: Japanese
- Meaning: Different meanings depending on the kanji used

Kunishige (written: 邦茂 or 邦成) is a masculine Japanese given name. Notable people with the name include:

- Date Kunishige (伊達 邦成; 1841–1904), Japanese samurai
- Kunishige Kamamoto (釜本 邦茂; 1944–2025), Japanese football player, manager and politician

Kunishige (written: 國重) is also a Japanese surname. Notable people with the surname include:

- Frank Kunishige (1878–1960), Japanese-American Pictorialist photographer
- Junji Kunishige (國重 純二; 1942–2013), Japanese scholar and translator
