= Brian Glüss =

Brian Glüss FRSS
- Born: 23 August 1930; London, England
- Died: 26 December 2013 (aged 83); Berkeley, California, United States
- Education: Bedford Modern School
- Alma mater: Pembroke College, Cambridge
- Occupation: Statistician

Brian Glüss FRSS (23 August 1930 – 26 December 2013) was a British statistician, mathematician, systems engineer and author. He also became an expert on victims of violent death in war and peace, on the process of healing their families and on the condition of survivor guilt.

== Early life ==
Brian Glüss was born in London on 23 August 1930, the son of Joseph Glüss and Otilie (née Tenenhaus). His father, known as "Mottle", was from Russia and his mother, known as "Tilly", was from Botosani in Romania. They were all Jewish. In 1940, the family suffered tragedy when their London home was hit by a German bomb killing Glüss's grandmother Anna Tenenhaus nee Goldshlager and his brother, Michael. The family moved to Bedford and Glüss was educated in the town at Bedford Modern School where he excelled. After National Service with the Royal Air Force, Glüss went up to Pembroke College, Cambridge, on a state scholarship, matriculating in 1949 and taking the Mathematical Tripos. On graduation he was made a Pembroke Foundation Scholar and he took the Diploma in Mathematical Statistics in 1953.

== Career ==
On leaving Cambridge, Glüss was made research assistant to Professor Maurice Kendall (later Sir Maurice Kendall), an esteemed statistician who was then at the London School of Economics. After the LSE he worked as an actuarial clerk at Prudential Assurance in London before leaving England for America in 1954 having been contracted to work on the Jury Project at the University of Chicago. At the end of his contract he went to Ottawa as an Assistant to the Senior Researcher in the Bureau of Statistics of the Canadian Government between 1956 and 1958. At the end of his tenure at Ottawa, he returned to Chicago and became a staff member at the Illinois Institute of Technology between 1958 and 1962 before studying for a PhD in Electrical Engineering at Berkeley University; he was awarded his PhD in 1965.

After Berkeley, Glüss moved to Santa Monica, California, where he worked for the RAND Corporation under Richard Bellman, an American applied mathematician and pioneer of dynamic programming, a subject on which Glüss wrote 'a well received book'. Following his time at the RAND Corporation he was made a Professor at the University of Illinois at Chicago and, later, Emeritus Professor following his retirement in 1988.

== Work on survivor guilt and charitable causes ==
Glüss didn't speak about the tragic circumstances that had befallen his family until he was 25, but instead found consolation in the work of William Niederland, a New York psychoanalyst who had observed, examined and worked with 2,000 survivors of the Nazi concentration camps. Writing to his old school in 2006 about his own experience and his respect for Niederland, Glüss commented:

To varying degrees, he [Niederland] found a bundle of common symptoms, which he later termed survivor guilt. Then, in the 1950s, he went on to examine peacetime survivors, in the US, who had lost loved ones to violent death in peacetime, by murder, suicide, violent accident. Again, in varying degrees, the same symptoms cropped up. Discovering Neiderland was the key to my final recovery. Without him I’d still be in generalized grief. When I work with survivors, I use his method

Inspired by Niederland, Glüss used his own experiences to help others in one-on-one work with other survivors. He engaged in voluntary work in retirement homes in Berkeley, California, and was a voluntary mentor for victims of grief.

== Personal life ==
Whilst at Berkeley, Glüss married Joan Marie Chodorow, a therapist. The marriage was difficult and ended in divorce but he was fond of his stepchild, Lori Kim Smallwood. A life already beset by tragedy, his stepdaughter was murdered in 1980 which led to Glüss campaigning against handgun ownership; his writings influenced the San Francisco and Berkeley gun control ordinances of 1982. After that sad event and retirement, he devoted his life to charitable and political causes; the tragedies he'd faced ‘did not diminish his cheerfulness and optimism’. He died on Boxing Day 2013 in Berkeley.

== Selected works ==
- An elementary introduction to dynamic programming; a state equation approach. Published by Allyn & Bacon, Boston, USA, 1972
- Invariant imbedding and the solution of differential equations. Published by the RAND Corporation, Santa Monica, California, USA, 1966
- A diffusion-equation model for neuron firing with exponential decay of potential. Published by the RAND Corporation, Santa Monica, California, 1966
- Generalizations of the two-armed bandit problem. Dissertation for the University of California, Berkeley, 1965
