= Sępopol =

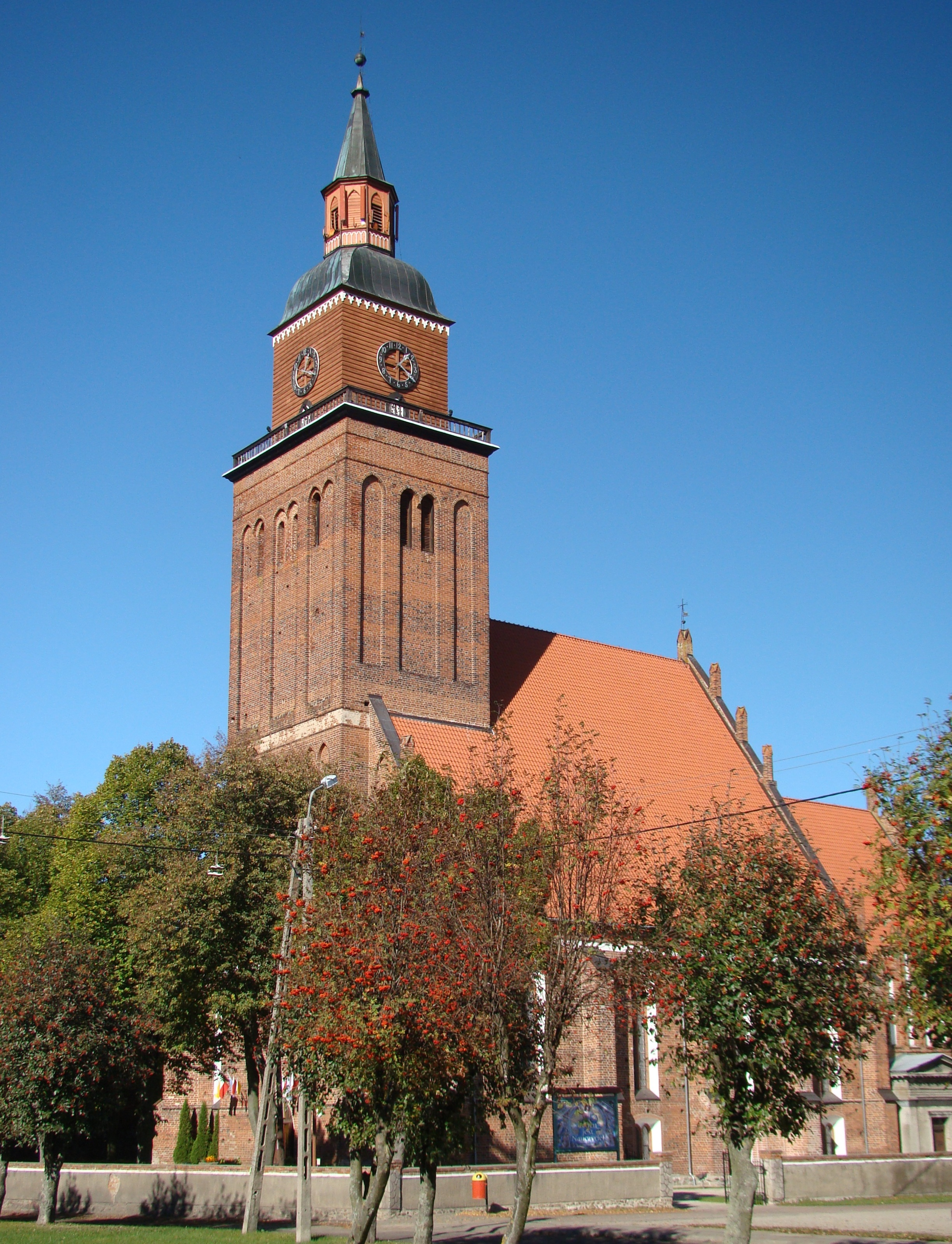
- Saint Michael, the Archangel Church

- Coat of arms

- Location within Poland
- Coordinates: 54°16′5″N 21°0′1″E
- Country: Poland
- Voivodeship: Warmian-Masurian
- County: Bartoszyce
- Gmina: Sępopol
- Established: 14th century
- Town rights: 1351

Area
  - Total: 4.63 km^{2} (1.79 sq mi)

Population (2013)
  - Total: 2,016
  - Density: 435/km^{2} (1,130/sq mi)
- Time zone: UTC+1 (CET)
  - Summer (DST): UTC+2 (CEST)
- Postal code: 11-210
- Vehicle registration: NBA
- Website: http://www.sepopol.pl

Sępopol [sɛmˈpɔpɔl] (German: Schippenbeil) is a town in Bartoszyce County, Warmian-Masurian Voivodeship, in northern Poland, with 2,013 inhabitants in 2016.

Sępopol is a member of Cittaslow.

== History ==
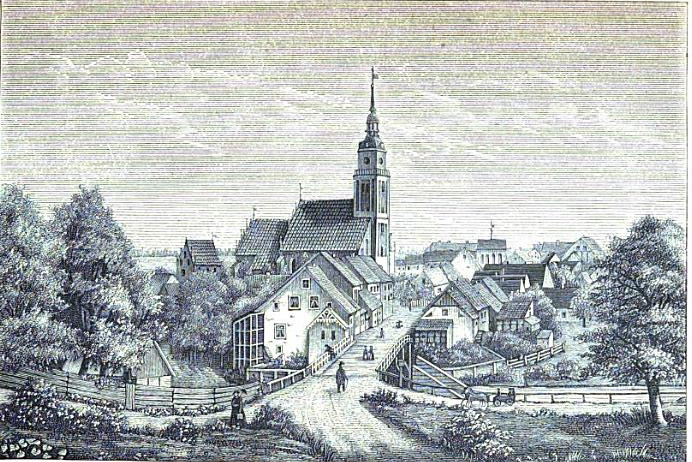
19th-century view of the town

The town is located at an Old Prussian settlement which received town rights in 1351 as "Schiffenburg", after the area was conquered by the Teutonic Knights. In 1372 the town was surrounded by a defensive wall with two entrance gates. In 1440 the town joined the anti-Teutonic Prussian Confederation, at which request in 1454 King Casimir IV Jagiellon signed the act of incorporation of the region to Poland. During the Thirteen Years’ War (1454–1466), the town was successfully defended against the Teutonic Knights, until 1461. After the Second Peace of Toruń of 1466 the town became part of Poland as a fief held by the State of the Teutonic Order. The town's seal was attached to the documents of the peace treaty. To the local Polish inhabitants the town was known under its archaic Polish name Szępopel. An important route connecting Warsaw and Königsberg (Królewiec) ran through the town, contributing to the town's prosperity.

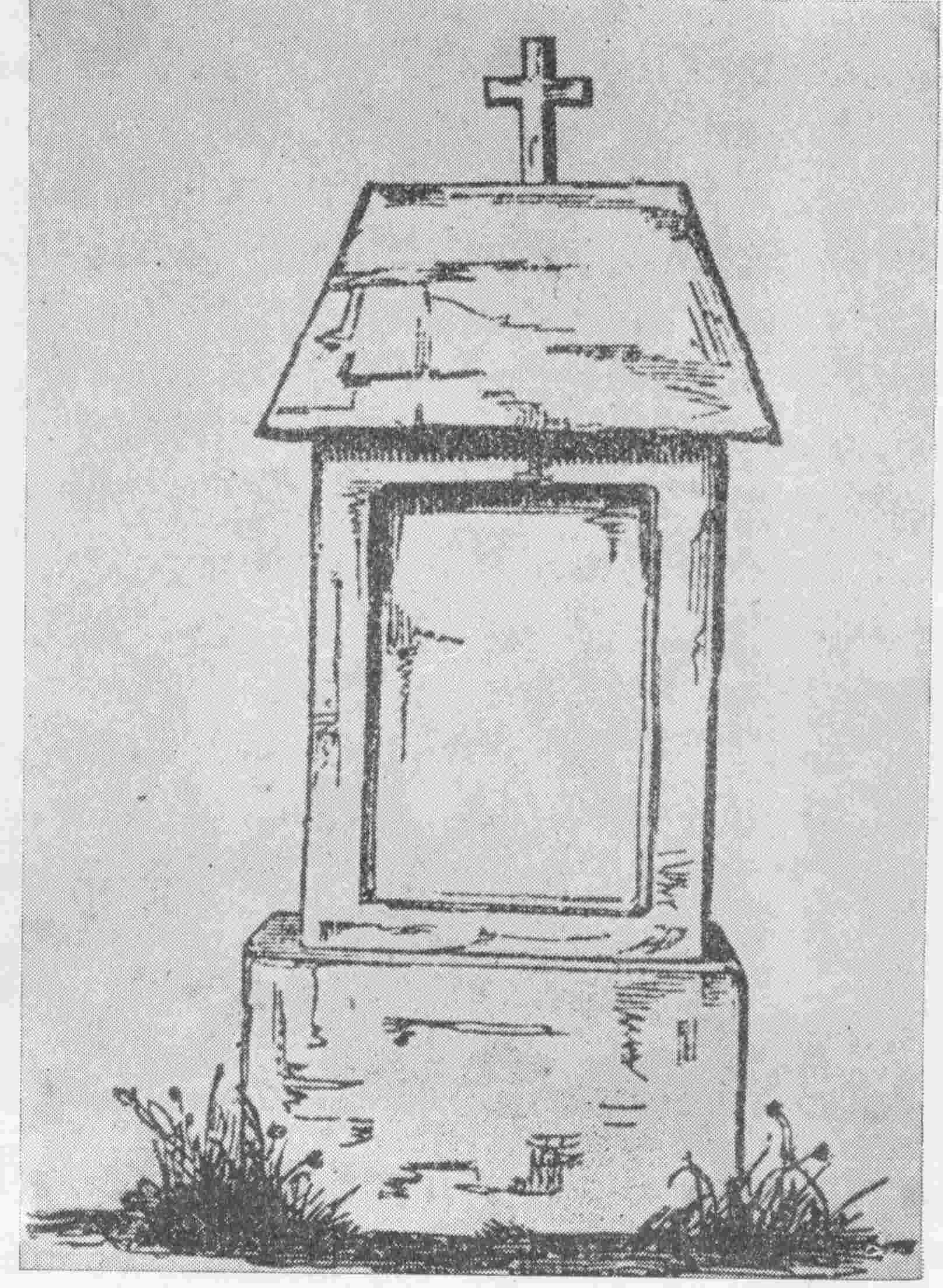
Former 19th-century memorial to Józef Jan Giedroyć

In 1710 about 50 percent of the population (800 inhabitants) died of the epidemic plague and the town was largely destroyed by a fire in 1749. As the town became part of the Kingdom of Prussia in 1701, it was peripheral in the new state and wasn't able to rebuild itself and return to its former prosperity, because the trade traffic on the Warsaw-Königsberg route froze as the result of the end of Polish suzerainty over the town and the region north of the town to Königsberg. The 18th-century border of Poland ran in close proximity, south of the town. The town was occupied by Russia from 1758 to 1762 during the Seven Years' War. In 1772, it became part of the newly formed province of East Prussia. During the Napoleonic Wars, in 1806-1807, the Baroque town hall and the old granaries were burnt down. After the Polish November Uprising from September 1831 to February 1832, interned Polish officers and soldiers stayed in the town. The Polish officer Józef Jan Giedroyć was awarded the Virtuti Militari (the highest Polish military decoration), soon died and was buried on a hill in the town, which was later called the Giedroyć Hill. The memorial monument was destroyed after some time.

In the late 19th century the town was slowly declining. Local Jews, whose community existed since the beginning of the 19th century, were imprisoned by the German Nazi regime in the Stutthof concentration camp during World War II. Also, the German Nazi regime operated a forced labour subcamp of the Stalag I-A prisoner-of-war camp in the town, and a subcamp of the Stutthof concentration camp near the town. The inmates of the latter were evacuated in January 1945 and murdered in the Palmnicken massacre. In early February 1945, the Soviets entered the almost completely abandoned city, plundered it and destroyed it. After the war it became again part of Poland.

== Architecture ==
Among the heritage monuments of the city are the Gothic Saint Michael the Archangel Church, fragments of medieval city walls, an Art Nouveau water tower and a number of houses, the oldest dating back to the 15th century.

== Demographics ==
Historical population

Year	Pop.	±%
1871	3,100	—
1880	3,174	+2.4%
1890	2,996	−5.6%
1900	2,433	−18.8%
1910	2,415	−0.7%

Year	Pop.	±%
1925	2,431	+0.7%
1933	2,795	+15.0%
1950	1,592	−43.0%
1960	2,276	+43.0%
2010	2,013	−11.6%

== Sports ==
The local football club is Łyna Sępopol. It competes in the lower leagues.

== Notable residents ==
- William Guglielmo Niederland (1904-1993), German-American psychoanalyst
