= Hoërskool Jan van Riebeeck =

School in Cape Town, Western Cape, South Africa

Coordinates: 33.933665°S 18.408371°E

Location
- 129 Kloof Street, Gardens, 8001, Cape Town, Western Cape; South Africa

Information
- School type: Public & Boarding
- Motto: "Wees uself" (Be yourself)
- Religious affiliation: Christianity
- Established: 1926; 100 years ago
- Founder: J.J. Jordaan
- School number: +27 (021) 437 6347
- Headmaster: Pieter Rademeyer
- Superintendent for Huis Jordaan (Girl's hostel): Huibrecht Steyn
- Superintendent for Huis van der Merwe (Boy's hostel): Jan Henning
- Grades: 8–12
- Gender: Boys & Girls
- Enrollment: 500 pupils
- Language: Afrikaans
- Schedule: 07:35- 14:15
- Campus: Urban Campus
- Campus type: Suburban
- Houses: Reijger; Dromedaris; De Goede Hoop
- Colors: Gold; Navy; White
- Nickname: Jan van Riebeeckers
- Website: www.janvanriebeeck.co.za

Hoërskool Jan van Riebeeck is a public co-educational high school situated in Gardens in Cape Town in the Western Cape province of South Africa. With Afrikaans as its medium of instruction, it was founded by Mr J.J. Jordaan (the first principal) in 1926.

== Overview ==
The school is situated at the foot of Table Mountain right next to the historical Welgemeend in Cape Town. It has an enrollment of approximately 500 pupils, who are divided into three houses: Reijger, Dromedaris and De Goede Hoop, named after the three ships that Jan van Riebeeck landed in Cape Town in 1652. The school uses Afrikaans as a medium of learning and teaching. Famous alumni includes the singer Laurika Rauch, struggle hero and minister, Derek Hanekom, venture capitalist Roelof Botha, and judge and struggle hero, Jan Steyn.

== Boarding ==
The tradition of boarding at Jan van Riebeeck High dates back to 1953 with the construction of the Huis Jordaan, the girls hostel, on the school campus, and Huis van der Merwe near the sports grounds, after the Cape Town Administrator and its executive committee decided to make funds available for the construction of residences for the school in 1950. The tradition of boarding continues to this day and has become an integral part of life at the school, with a large number of pupils coming from afar.

=== Huis Jordaan ===
In 1952, the school committee and staff decided that the girls hostel would be called Huis Jordaan, after J.J. Jordaan, the first head of Jan van Riebeeck High School (1926 – 1936). On 9 December 1952, the cornerstone of Huis Jordaan was laid by W. de Vos Malan, Superintendent General of Education, and on 12 January 1953, Huis Jordaan was captured.

The Huis Jordaan facility caters for girls from grade 8 to 12, and accommodates termly and weekly boarders, with students returning home for the school holidays. Being a resident on campus means boarders have easy access to the school facilities. The facility is located next to the historic Welgemeend on the school premises in Kloof Street.
