= Magleby (surname) =

Magleby is a surname. Notable people with the surname include:

- Alexander Magleby (born 1978), American rugby union player and coach
- Christian Magleby (born 1977), Danish footballer
- David Magleby (born 1949), American political scientist
- Frank Magleby (1928–2013), American painter and educator
