= Morton J. Gold =

American Air Force brigadier general

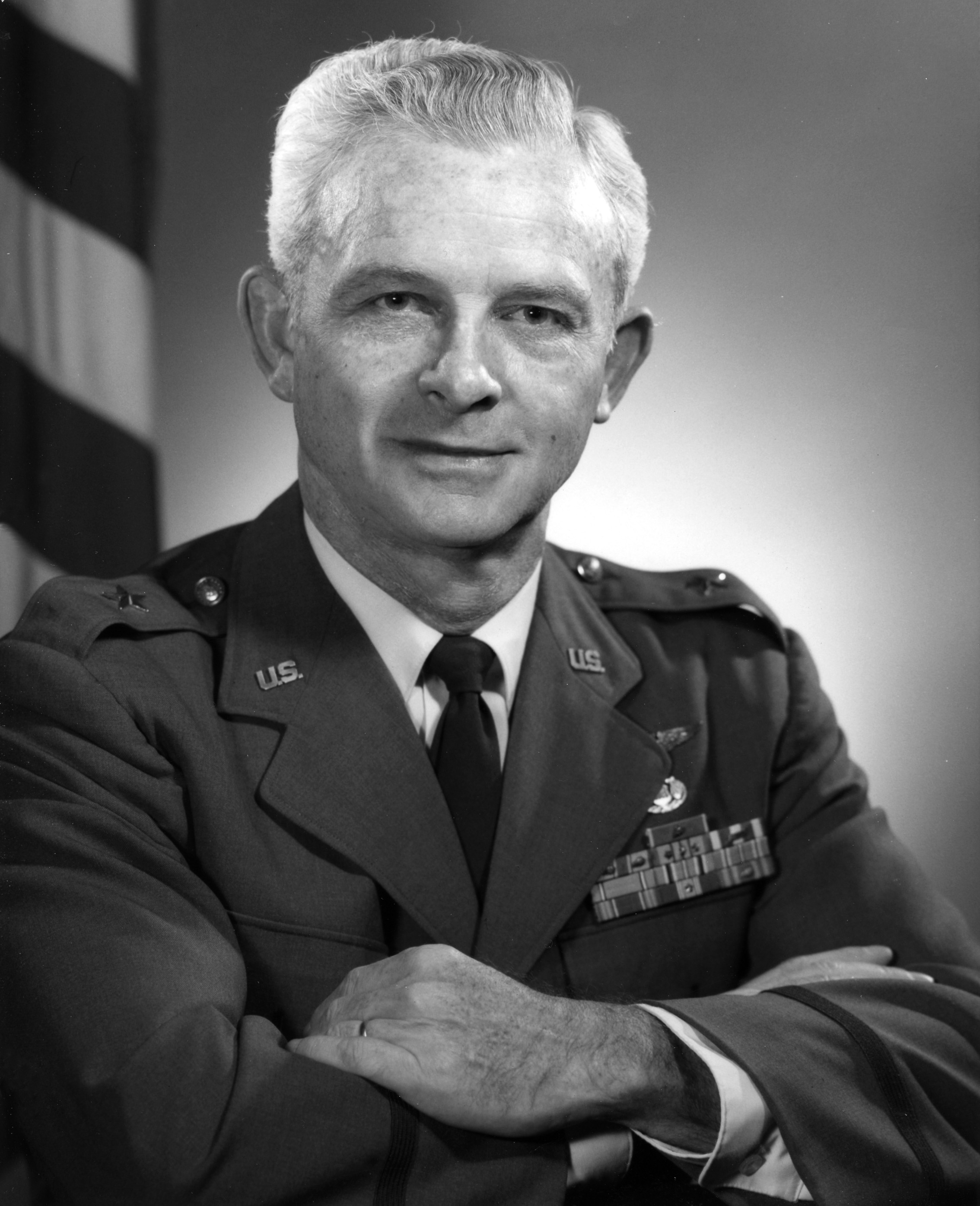
- Born: January 28, 1917; New York City, New York, U.S.
- Died: December 19, 2013 (aged 96); Riverside, California, U.S.
- Burial place: Riverside National Cemetery
- Military career
- Allegiance: United States of America
- Branch: United States Air Force
- Service years: 1949–1973
- Rank: Brigadier General
- Commands: Staff Judge Advocate, Headquarters Pacific Air Forces

Morton Joseph Gold (January 28, 1917 – December 19, 2013) was a United States Air Force (USAF) brigadier general who was staff judge advocate for Headquarters Pacific Air Forces, Hickam Air Force Base, Hawaii. In this position he was responsible for advising the commander in chief, PACAF, on all legal matters and interpreting and administering military law and justice for the command.

Gold was born in 1917 in New York City, where he attended Abraham Lincoln High School. He attended New York University, University of Iowa, and received a bachelor of laws degree from Brooklyn Law School in 1949. He is a member of the bars of the Supreme Court of the United States, the New York State Court of Appeals, the U.S. Court of Military Appeals, and the U.S. Customs Court.

He entered active military service in February 1941 and served in all branches of the Armed Forces, beginning with the Army Reserve Officers Training Corps, and, then the U.S. Marine Corps, U.S. Navy and, from 1949 until his death, the USAF. Upon the basis of his civilian pilot training prior to his entrance on active duty and subsequent aviation cadet training, he was assigned in October 1941 as a navigation instructor at the Naval Air Station, Jacksonville, Florida. He later served as communications officer with the Carrier Aircraft Service Unit #1, Pacific, and as a flight navigator during 1944–1945 with the Naval Air Transport Service in the South Atlantic and Pacific.

From December 1945 to September 1946, Gold was assigned as executive officer of the Naval Air Facility at the U.S. Naval Academy, Annapolis, Maryland. He next attended law school through January 1949. He resigned his commission as a line officer in the Navy in order to be commissioned in the Air Force as a judge advocate. He was recalled to active duty in March 1949 and named a member of the New Trial Board, Headquarters U.S. Air Force. In October 1952 Gold was assigned to Headquarters Air Materiel Command, Wright-Patterson Air Force Base, Ohio, as executive officer and later as chief of the Appeals and Litigation Division of the Office of the Staff Judge Advocate. His second overseas tour of duty was served with the Spain Air Materiel Area from October 1953 to November 1956. During this period, he held the posts of staff judge advocate and acting legal adviser to the chief, Joint U.S. Military Group, Spain, and member of the Foreign Claims Commission, Spain.

Gold returned to Headquarters USAF in November 1956 as special assistant to the judge advocate general and later was assigned as chief of the Special Activities Group in the Office of the Judge Advocate General. He was transferred to McClellan Air Force Base, California, in July 1960 as the staff judge advocate, Sacramento Air Materiel Area. His primary duties were in the areas of procurement, claims, civil law and military justice. In July 1963 Gold was reassigned to Headquarters Air Force Logistics Command as the deputy staff judge advocate and chief, Procurement Law Division. As the deputy staff judge advocate, he exercised general supervision over legal activities at Headquarters and its field installations. His duties in procurement law gave him responsibility for all AFLC and Aeronautical Systems Division legal areas concerned with procurement.

In October 1965 Gold was assigned as the staff judge advocate, Second Air Division in the Republic of Vietnam. For two months he had the additional duty of serving as staff judge advocate to General William Westmoreland, commander, U.S. Military Assistance Command, Vietnam. He established and supervised nine legal offices and formulated much of the legal policy which is being used by U.S. military attorneys in Vietnam. In August 1966 he was assigned to duty as staff judge advocate, Air Force Contract Management Division, Los Angeles, California. His responsibilities encompassed the legal aspects of contract administration for more than 18,000 contracts. In 1968 he was the chairman of the Los Angeles County Combined Federal Campaign. In September 1969 Gold was reassigned to Headquarters Air Force Systems Command, Andrews Air Force Base, Maryland, as the deputy staff judge advocate. His next assignment, in February 1970, was as assistant judge advocate general, Headquarters U.S. Air Force. Gold assumed the position of PACAF staff judge advocate in August 1971.

Special assignments during his 30-year military career include serving as a member of the Korean Armistice Ad Hoc Committee, Department of Defense; special representative to the United Nations as an expert on Communist violations of the Korean Armistice; assisted in arranging for the first Space Law Symposium sponsored by the USAF Reserve Judge Advocates General, New York City, conducted in 1959 for members of the Federal and State judiciary and the U.N.; assistant to the chairman, Joint Chiefs of Staff, for the purpose of briefing United Nations ambassadors and their military advisers who participated in the Korean War on violations of the Armistice Treaty; drafter of several of the agreements between the United States and Spain.

His military decorations and awards include the Legion of Merit with two oak leaf clusters, Air Force Commendation Medal with two oak leaf clusters, and Distinguished Unit Citation Emblem. His hometown is Glen Cove, New York. He was promoted to brigadier general effective February 6, 1970, with date of rank January 24, 1970. He retired May 1, 1973. Gold died at his home in Riverside, California on December 19, 2013. He is buried in Riverside National Cemetery, Riverside, California.
