= Katsumi Satō =

Japanese human rights activist

Katsumi Satō (佐藤 勝巳, Satō Katsumi; March 5, 1929 – December 2, 2013) was a Japanese human rights activist, editor, and critic.

He was the chairperson of the Association of Families of Victims Kidnapped by North Korea, and head of the so-called Contemporary Korea Research Institute ("現代コリア研究所").

== Life ==
Born in Niigata Prefecture, he left Maki High School and began working for K Line, where he got involved in union activities, and was fired in 1950, during the red scare. He became involved with the repatriation of Koreans from Japan to North Korea, and received 2 medals for this from North Korea (1962, 1964). At the same time he was active in the movement that campaigned against the discrimination of Koreans in Japan. Disappointed with the human rights situation in North Korea, he quit the Japanese Communist Party, of which he had been a member, did so-called tenkō, and became an anti-communist.

He was chairperson of the "Association of Families of Victims Kidnapped by North Korea" (AFVKN) between 1998 and 2008.

He died on December 2, 2013, from pneumonia.

== Writings (selection) ==
- 『日本の漁業と日韓条約』（寺尾五郎,佐藤勝巳共著. 日本朝鮮研究所, 1965）
- 『在日朝鮮人の諸問題』（同成社, 1971）
- 『叢書現代のアジア・アフリカ. 4』（三省堂, 1971）
- 『在日朝鮮人 : その差別と処遇の実態』（同成社, 1974）
- 『わが体験的朝鮮問題』（東洋経済新報社, (1978, 11月）
- 『日本社会党|社会党と北朝鮮との癒着』（自由民主党]]調査局政治資料研究会議, 1989, 11月）
- 『在日韓国・朝鮮人に問う : 緊張から和解への構想』（亜紀書房, 1991, 4月）ISBN 9784750591094
- 『崩壊する北朝鮮 : 日朝交渉急ぐべからず』（ネスコ, 1991年4月）ISBN 4890368167
- 『なぜ急ぐのか日朝交渉』（現代コリア研究所, 1991年11月）ISBN 9784750591216
- 『検証・北朝鮮―北朝鮮の全体像を読む』（関川夏央, 山田英雄, 坂田俊文, 塚本勝一共著. ジャプラン出版, 1992, 6月）ISBN 9784915536182
- 『北朝鮮「恨（ハン）」の核戦略 : 世界一貧しい強国の論理』（光文社, 1993, 7月）ISBN 4334012809
- 『北朝鮮崩壊と日本 : アジア激変を読む』（長谷川慶太郎,佐藤勝巳共著. 光文社, 1996, 4月）ISBN 4334013120
- 『朝鮮半島―人と文化と政治』（尹学準, 筒井真樹子, 佐藤勝巳, 中村均, 野副伸一共著. 亜細亜大学 アジア研究所, 1998, 1月）ISBN 9784900521124
- 『北朝鮮が戦争を起こす5つの根拠』（池田菊敏 [他]共著. ベストセラーズ, 1998, 12月）ISBN 4584183783
- 『北朝鮮の「今」がわかる本』（三笠書房, 1999, 8月）ISBN 4837970516
- 『朝鮮情勢を読む』（晩聲社, 2000, 10月）ISBN 4891883006
- 『朝鮮統一の戦慄 : 呑み込まれる韓国、日本の悪夢』（長谷川慶太郎,佐藤勝巳共著. 光文社, 2000年10月）ISBN 4334006906
- 『日本外交はなぜ朝鮮半島に弱いのか』（草思社, 2002, 3月）ISBN 4794210752
- 『北朝鮮の「今」がわかる本』（三笠書房, 2002, 12月）ISBN 4837919995
- 『拉致家族「金正日との戦い」全軌跡』（小学館, 2002, 12月）ISBN 4094028900
- 『北朝鮮による拉致を考える : 中学生・高校生に知ってほしいこと』（明成社, 2004, 3月）ISBN 4944219261
- 『イラク後の朝鮮半島 : 東アジアの新局面を探る』（野副伸一, 朱建栄, 恵谷治, 佐藤勝巳, 友田錫共著. 亜細亜大学アジア研究所, 2004, 3月）ISBN 4900521183
