= Edo Patregnani =

Italian footballer (1938-2013)

Personal information
- Full name: Edo Patregnani
- Date of birth: 1 May 1938
- Place of birth: Fano, Province of Pesaro and Urbino, Kingdom of Italy
- Date of death: 3 December 2013 (aged 75)
- Place of death: Cento, Province of Ferrara, Italy
- Height: 1.80 m (5 ft 11 in)
- Position: Goalkeeper

Edo Patregnani (1 May 1938 – 3 December 2013) was an Italian footballer who primarily played as a goalkeeper.

Patregnani died on 3 December 2013, aged 75, in Cento, Province of Ferrara, Italy.
