= Stephen Bruce =

South African cricketer (1954–2013)

Personal information
- Born: 11 January 1954; Nkana, Northern Rhodesia
- Died: 12 December 2013 (aged 59)
- Source: ESPNcricinfo, 20 May 2016

Stephen Bruce (11 January 1954 – 12 December 2013) was a South African cricketer. He played first-class and List A matches for Orange Free State and Western Province between 1971 and 1987.
