= Eli Beeding =

American test pilot

Eli Lackland Beeding Jr. (December 17, 1928 – December 21, 2013) was a U.S. Air Force captain and rocket test subject. In 1958, a series of experiments using a miniature rocket sled began at Holloman AFB under the supervision of Colonel John Stapp and Captain Beeding. Participants rode the "Daisy Sled" (so-called because it was originally designed to be air, and not rocket, powered) at various speeds and in many different positions—even head first—in an attempt to learn more about the g-force limits of the human body.

On May 16, Capt. Eli Beeding made a 40 g run. The Daisy shot down the track, reached a top speed around 632 mph, and came to a screeching halt in less than a tenth of a second. "When I hit the water brake," Beeding recalled in a recent interview, "It felt like Ted Williams had hit me on the back, about lumbar five, with a baseball bat". Beeding had barely informed flight surgeon Capt. Les Eason of his troubles when he began to experience tunnel vision and passed out.

The standard protocol for shock would be to elevate Beeding's feet, but there was a chance his back was broken, in which case he should not have been touched. Taking a calculated risk, Eason and Tech. Sgt. Roy Gatewood gently moved Beeding onto the side of the sled and elevated his feet. Ten minutes later, Beeding emerged from shock and was rushed to the base hospital. Doctors determined his back was only badly bruised. "I thought that was the big excitement of the day", Beeding recalls. "But later my boss came to me and said, ‘The chest accelerometer tracing shows you got 82.6 g!’"

Subsequent tests with bears showed that the reading was not a fluke and that Beeding had indeed endured a massive g load. When word got out, the young captain made headlines as the man who had topped John Stapp's g-force record. Beeding, however, is quick to point out that he rode the sled backwards, and that his time at 83 gs was "infinitesimal" compared to the 1.1 second durations Stapp faced during his own tests. "That doesn’t sound like much [time]", Beeding notes, "But I guarantee you, having been through it at lesser durations, one second is an eternity".

Beeding appeared in the Guinness Book of World Records for several decades thereafter. Guinness and many other sources incorrectly reported that Beeding endured 82.6 gs for 0.04 seconds. Beeding's sled in fact deccelerated at 40.4 gs for 0.04 seconds as it slowed from 35 mph to a stop over a distance of one foot. 82.6 gs was a brief peak acceleration measured by a sensor on his chest due to elastic response of his rib cage.

Beeding retired from the Air Force in 1971, later moving to Colorado where he died in 2013 at the age of 85.
