= Don Williams (American football coach) =

American football and track and field coach

Biographical details
- Born: December 3, 1927; Akron, Ohio, U.S.
- Died: December 4, 2013 (aged 86); Huntington, West Virginia, U.S.

Coaching career (HC unless noted)

Football
- 1955–1956: Bluefield HS (WV)
- 1957–1958: Worthy HS (VA)
- 1959–1969: Concord

Track
- 1972–1974: Marshall

Head coaching record
- Overall: 42–55–4 (college football)

Accomplishments and honors

Championships
- 2 WVIAC (1962, 1966); 1 WVIAC Western Division (1962)

William Don Williams (December 3, 1927 – December 4, 2013) was an American football and track and field coach. He served as the head football coach at Concord University in Athens, West Virginia from 1959 to 1969, compiling a record of 42–55–4. Williams was also the head track coach at Marshall University in Huntington, West Virginia from 1972 to 1974.

== Head coaching record ==
=== College football ===
Year	Team	Overall	Conference	Standing	Bowl/playoffs	NAIA^{#}
Concord Mountain Lions (West Virginia Intercollegiate Athletic Conference) (1959–1969)
1959	Concord	2–7	2–6	6th (Western)		
1960	Concord	4–3–2	4–2–2	4th (Western)		
1961	Concord	5–4	3–4	4th (Western)		
1962	Concord	6–2–1	6–0–1	1st (Western)		
1963	Concord	2–6–1	2–5–1	5th (Western)		
1964	Concord	3–5	3–4	7th		
1965	Concord	4–5	3–4	6th		
1966	Concord	9–1	6–0	1st		8
1967	Concord	7–2	5–1	2nd		14
1968	Concord	0–10	0–7	9th		
1969	Concord	0–10	0–7	10th		
Concord:		42–55–4	34–40–4			
Total:		42–55–4				
National championship Conference title Conference division title or championship game berth
^{#}Rankings from final NAIA Division I poll.
