= Albino Aroso =

Portuguese doctor/politician

Albino Aroso Ramos GOIH (Canidelo, Vila do Conde, 22 February 1923 – Porto, 26 December 2013) was a Portuguese doctor and politician, known as the "father of family planning in Portugal".

In 2006 he was awarded the I National Health Prize and was considered, by the World Medical Association, as one of the 65 physicians most dedicated to worldwide public causes.

== Life ==
He was the third of six siblings who, because of their father's premature death, were forever associated with their mother's name. He graduated, aged 24, in Medicine from University of Porto, then joining the Hospital Geral de Santo António, where he later was President of the Administration Council.

In 1967, he was one of the founders of the Association for Family Planning and two years later, for the first time in Portugal, he gave the first public and free appointment of family planning.

Albino Aroso provided a decisive contribution to the fight against infant mortality, an area where Portugal made extraordinary progress in a few decades, from one of the highest to one of the most reduced rates in infant mortality in Western Europe.

He was Associate Professor of Obstetrics and gynaecology at the Abel Salazar Biomedical Sciences Institute (ICBAS, in Portuguese) of University of Porto and was President of the Portuguese Society of Obstetrics and Gynaecology.

He was Assistant Secretary of State in the Ministry of Health of the XI Constitutional Government.

He died at home, in Porto, aged 90.

== Awards ==
- I National Health Prize (2006)
