= Gillis MacGill =

American model (1928–2013)

Gillis MacGill (September 2, 1928 – December 16, 2013) was a fashion model who opened her own modelling agency, Mannequin, in November 1960. It was located at 10 West 57th Street in New York City. At the time MacGill was thirty-two years of age and was earning $60 an hour as a runway model. She was a top model for twenty years. In 1972, her business was called Mannequin Fashion Models Agency.

== Personal life ==
MacGill lived in Manhattan, born and raised in the Bronx as a first generation American, born of Jewish immigrants from what is now part of Ukraine, and in Southampton, Massachusetts. She met her first husband, Philip Stearns, on a blind date. They married in 1949 but divorced six years later. met Bruce Addison, whom she would later marry. Both were listed among New York Social Diary Personages on August 18, 2005. The couple had twin sons, Blake and Anthony Addison.

MacGill loved art and worked with the Parrish Art Museum in Water Mill, New York.

== Career ==
She began as a stock girl with Bergdorf Goodman in 1944. MacGill's first assignment as a model occurred when she was asked to appear for a store fashion show. Following the show she was approached by store president, Andrew Goodman. He queried her as to why she appeared so aloof, even angry. MacGill responded that her facial expressions were a means of dealing with fear. Beginning in 1949 she worked in the posh salons of designers and 7th Avenue (Manhattan) showrooms. She believed her success as a model was a product of her desire to make good. I wanted desperately to be a model. I craved it. At one time she was one of 25 house models at Bergdorf Goodman and one of 10 at Nettie Rosenstein.

She started Mannequin with twelve models who looked very similar in a group photograph taken by noted photographer Mark Shaw. MacGill explained that no two girls show a dress the same way and projecting yourself on a runway or in a Seventh Avenue showroom is a skill.

Mozella Roberts, an early African American model, was hired by MacGill in 1961. Roberts worked as a showroom model for Scaasi and Arthur Jablow, as well as doing freelance for many manufacturers and stores. She modelled designs by Donald Brooks during a costume audition for No Strings, a Broadway musical by Richard Rodgers. No Strings revolved around a black American model who was employed in Paris, France.

In October 1965, a New York Times pictorial featured the visit of Prince Harald V of Norway to New York City. One photo showed Macgill curtsying to the prince at a fashion show. She was modelling a white mink jacket and navy bell bottom pants from Bonwit Teller. When designers began to cut dresses to the navel, in 1967, MacGill commented that the word is out, the bosom can show. As proprietor of Mannequin she sent out the same models as always. She said that formerly models turned their shoulders and hid their breasts. Most who worked for her measured 34A or 34B, however MacGill noted it was untrue that models were not well-proportioned. They are as generously endowed as any size 8. As for her own taste, MacGill confessed to having tried every fashion fad of the times. I constantly change my hair, my make-up, my attitude.

In 1985, MacGill was president of the Mannequin division of Legends/Mannequin Agency.
