= Jan Steyn =

South African judge

Judge Jan Steyn

Personal details
- Born: 4 March 1928 Cape Town, Cape Province, Union of South Africa
- Died: 30 December 2013 (aged 85) Cape Town, Western Cape, South Africa
- Spouse: Ann Steyn
- Children: Ros Thomas, Piet Steyn, Avril Watson, Lala Steyn. Step children: Philip Kilroe, Bridget Searle, Nicola Taal
- Education: University of Stellenbosch
- Occupation: Judge

Jan Hendrik Steyn (known as Jan) (4 March 1928 – 30 December 2013) was a South African judge, a development leader and campaigner for social justice. He was an advocate for justice and equality in the Republic of South Africa and served South Africa and several Southern African Development Community countries, in the highest capacity in the fields of law and development. In recognition of his service he was awarded honorary doctorates from five South African universities.

Raised within the Afrikaner volk, he became a fierce opponent of apartheid, contributing towards it demise through active lobbying, working towards development for all and the creation of democracy.

His working life was characterised by service for the creation of a just and democratic society in South Africa. He believed strongly that all were equal before the law and that development is essential for the creation of a sustainable democracy.

He served as a judge in the Cape High Court, was President of the Appeal Court of Lesotho and served on the Courts of Appeal of Botswana and Swaziland. He also headed up the Urban Foundation and the Independent Development Trust (IDT), served on several commissions of enquiry, as Ombudsman for the Long-Term Insurance Industry and on the boards of non-profit organisations such as NICRO, and Communicare as well as companies such as Anglo American and Barclays Bank.

== Early history and family life ==
Jan Steyn was born in Cape Town to Zerilda (née Minnaar) and Hendrik (HPM) Steyn on 4 March 1928. His mother was a pioneer of social welfare in South Africa, founding the Urban Housing League.

His father, HPM Steyn, joined the Boer commandos during the Anglo-Boer War at the age of 13, and thereafter finished schooling when he was 24 years old. He became a gifted scholar in literature and theology at Victoria College, Stellenbosch, and later Princeton. He joined the Dutch Reformed Church ministry from 1917 to 1922. From 1922 to 1955 he was the tireless secretary of the British and Foreign Bible Society and due to his extensive work in this regard was also known as "Bible Steyn". According to one of the key translators of the Bible into Afrikaans, dr J D Kestell, HPM Steyn was the real force behind this translation process. He also facilitated the translation of the Bible into many other languages, including Xhosa, Herero and Tswana.

Both Jan Steyn's parents were awarded honorary doctorates by the University of Stellenbosch for their work and were dedicated to philanthropy.

Jan Steyn attended Jan van Riebeeck High School and graduated from Stellenbosch University with a BA LLB in 1949.

He married Audrey Steyn (née Tarleton) in 1951, and they had four children.

In 1981 he married Ann Steyn, who later became the president international of Reach to Recovery, an international volunteer breast cancer NGO.

== Legal career ==
Jan Steyn was admitted to the Cape Bar in 1950, after clerking for the late chief justice Newton Ogilvie Thompson. He was appointed as a Judge of the then Supreme Court of South Africa (Cape Provincial Division) at the young age of 36 in March 1964. He served permanently on the bench until March 1977 when he was called to head the Urban Foundation, resigning from the South African bench in 1981.

His approach to the law was described as follows by Jeremy Gauntlett, a senior advocate who served under him as judge of appeal in Lesotho:

"His interest in law was not for law’s sake; throughout his life it was for what law could do. He adhered to the aphorism that civilisation in a society is marked by the way it treats its criminals. He abhorred corporal punishment, especially when imposed for transgressions of prison rules. He felt strongly that bail should be fixed with proper regard for an accused’s means, to avoid breadwinners languishing in jail when they could remain in employment.
"It was his conviction that as a departure point in sentencing, every effort should be made to keep first offenders out of prison. He was a pioneering advocate of non-custodial sentences rather than short prison sentences, which he considered both damaging and ineffective. He thought the death penalty repugnant, executing his duty to impose it only in the most exceptional cases, and he pressed for its abolition.
"... Steyn was concerned that future lawyers should know the social realities outside panelled courtrooms. In his years at the Cape High Court he assiduously took university students to see prisons from the inside. He also saw the need to educate the public, and to help former prisoners make new lives. He played a leading role in setting up the National Institute for Crime Prevention and the Reintegration of Offenders."

In 1990, he was appointed to the Lesotho Court of Appeal where he served eight years as a member and subsequently 11 years as president. He also served for seven years on the Botswana Court of Appeal and until 2007 as a Judge of Appeal of Swaziland’s highest court.

In Lesotho, Steyn presided over many hearings that affected the quality of good governance in the Kingdom. Under his leadership, judgments of the Court of Appeal have spoken against corruption, unacceptable delays in the administration of justice, the constitutionality of the military justice process and the need for the judiciary to serve the public diligently by delivering reasoned judgment expeditiously.

When he retired as president of the Court of Appeal of Lesotho in 2008, Steyn was accorded a knighthood by King Letsie III.

He chaired several Commissions of Enquiry. These included the Commission on the Remuneration of Political Office Bearers in South Africa, which advised government on the remuneration for all political office bearers including that of the president, the Cabinet and all branches of government, including traditional leaders.

== Development work ==
Steyn "chafed at the confinement of the office [of judge]" and therefore left his post as judge for a period, involving himself directly in development work. His work beyond the confines of the law is described below under "Public interest bodies and boards of directors", but core to this was his involvement in the Urban Foundation and the Independent Development Trust.

=== Urban Foundation ===
After the Soweto uprising of 1976 Jan Steyn was instrumental in organising a summit of black urban leaders such as Nthato Motlana and industrialists led by Harry Oppenheimer and Anton Rupert. From this the Urban Foundation was born.

Steyn headed up the Urban Foundation from 1977. The Urban Foundation was a non-profit organisation founded and funded by business-leaders who were determined that the country avoid the collision course it was on. It identified initiatives which could facilitate access to housing, quality education and business opportunities for urban black communities. Funding was provided by domestic and international business. In this way the Urban Foundation played a major role in improving the day-to-day lives of hundreds of thousands of disadvantaged South Africans.

At the time, black people in South Africa had no claim to land title in "white" urban areas: "their very residence there was on sufferance", under section 10 of the Bantu Urban Areas Act. "The fiction was that they were mere sojourners, with home and heart in the archipelago of Bantustans, to which (from 1976) 'independence' was being granted."

The Urban Foundation successfully lobbied for the abolition of racially discriminatory enactments including the infamous pass laws, influx control and the Group Areas Act and invested large amounts of money in housing, education and associated developments, such as the electrification of Soweto.

According to Jeremy Gauntlett, "[i]t grieved Steyn to see that a decade later, matric history textbooks claimed that the Urban Foundation and its successor [the IDT] had been an instrument to modernise racial domination."

=== Independent Development Trust (IDT) ===
When making his now famous address on 2 February 1990 the then State President of South Africa, FW de Klerk, when announcing the release of Nelson Mandela and the lifting of political restrictions, also announced the allocation of R2 billion for development to be administered by the Independent Development Trust (IDT) chaired by Jan Steyn. This initiative was launched after he obtained the unequivocal support of black leadership at the time, especially and including the late former president Nelson Mandela. Steyn insisted that government (which at the time was the National Party government) would have no say as to how the money would be spent.

The IDT Board was led by people such as Mamphela Ramphele, Stanley Mokgoba, Harriet Ngubane, Wiseman Nkuhlu and Eric Molobi. It delivered development programmes such as incremental housing, national student loan financing, public works programmes to create jobs, infrastructure for the poor and the building of schools and clinics.

In 1996, Steyn handed over the reins to Nkuhlu.

== Public interest bodies and boards of directors ==
Steyn was also involved in several public interest bodies as chairperson, trustee and/or member, among them the National Institute for Crime Prevention and the Re-Integration of Offenders (NICRO), the Legal Resources Centre, the Old Mutual Unclaimed Shares Trust, Communicare, the Community Chest of the Western Cape, the Abe Bailey Trust, the National Botanical Institute (now the South African National Biodiversity Institute), and the Media Council. He served on the Board of Directors of Anglo American plc, Barloworld Limited, First National Bank, Metropolitan Life and Vergelegen and founded the Institute of Criminology at the University of Cape Town (UCT) in 1970.

Jan Steyn received honorary doctorates from five South African universities, namely UCT, Stellenbosch University, the University of Witwatersrand, the University of Natal and the Medical University of South Africa (MEDUNSA), the latter of which he was chancellor for 10 years. He also served on the Councils of UCT and the University of South Africa.

He was an active sportsman. As a young man he was first league rugby referee, and served as President of the Western Province Cricket Club and Rondebosch Golf Club for many years.

== Link to Nelson Mandela ==
During his time as a judge, Steyn regularly visited prisons, including those used to detain political prisoners by the then government interceding with the authorities for improved conditions. It was through such visits to Robben Island that he first met Nelson Mandela. The outcome of one such visit (together with Judges Michael Corbett and Martin (ME) Theron), as well as the head of the prison service, General J C Steyn (unrelated to Judge Steyn), was the removal of the commanding officer (a Colonel Piet Badenhorst) and an immediate improvement in the conditions in which political prisoners were detained.

This incident created a bond between Mr Mandela and Steyn. This is likely to have contributed to Steyn being called upon to chair the Commission on the Remuneration of Political Office Bearers in South Africa, as well as other assignments.
