= Donn Robins =

Australian cricketer

Personal information
- Full name: Donnell Robins
- Born: 7 March 1934; Broken Hill, New South Wales, Australia
- Died: 8 December 2013 (aged 79); Mudgee, New South Wales
- Batting: Right-handed
- Bowling: Right-arm medium

Domestic team information
- Years: Team
- 1964-65 to 1966-67: South Australia

Career statistics
Competition	First-class
Matches	20
Runs scored	340
Batting average	11.72
100s/50s	0/0
Top score	44
Balls bowled	3726
Wickets	52
Bowling average	33.59
5 wickets in innings	3
10 wickets in match	0
Best bowling	6/58
Catches/stumpings	12/–
- Source: CricketArchive, 19 September 2013

Donnell Robins (7 March 1934 – 8 December 2013) was a cricketer who played first-class cricket for South Australia from 1964-65 to 1966-67.

== Career ==
In the 1965–66 season, playing in Adelaide for South Australia against New South Wales in the Sheffield Shield, Robins performed the rare feat of taking four wickets in four balls. He took a hat-trick to end the New South Wales first innings, then dismissed Bob Simpson with the first ball of the second innings.

Robins took 6 for 62 in the first innings of that match, then took 6 for 58 when South Australia played New South Wales in Sydney later that season. Between those two matches he hit his highest score of 44 against Queensland in Brisbane. He finished the 1965-66 season with 30 wickets at 29.30. After a few unsuccessful matches in 1966-67 he played no more first-class cricket.
