= Kazutami Watanabe =

Japanese scholar

Kazutami Watanabe (渡邊一民, Watanabe Kazutami; January 5, 1932 – December 21, 2013) was a Japanese scholar and translator of French literature.

Watanabe, who was born in Tokyo, graduated from the Literature Department, School of French Studies of the University of Tokyo in 1955. After getting his Ph.D at the same university, he became a lecturer at Rikkyo University's General Education Department in 1960, and an assistant professor in 1963. In 1965, he became an assistant professor at the School of French Literature of the same university and in 1970 a full professor. From 1981 to 1983, he was the dean of the Literature Department. After his retirement in 1997, he was named professor emeritus.

His wife, Hitomi, is the eldest daughter of Shūichi Sakō, a diplomat. Watanabe died at the age of 81 from sepsis in December 2013.

== Awards ==
- Kamei Katsu Award (1982) for his book about Kunio Kishida.

== Writings ==
- 神話への反抗（思潮社, 1968）
- ドレフュス事件|ドレーフュス事件 政治体験から文学創造への道程（筑摩書房, 1972）
- 文化革命と知識人（第三文明社, 1972）
- 近代日本の知識人（筑摩書房, 1976）
- フランス文壇史（朝日選書, 1976）
- 西欧逍遥』（講談社, 1978）
- 岸田国士論』（岩波書店, 1982）
- ナショナリズムの両義性 若い友人への手紙（人文書院, 1984）
- 林達夫とその時代,（岩波書店, 1988）
- 故郷論』（筑摩書房, 1992）
- フランスの誘惑 近代日本精神史試論,（岩波書店, 1995）
- 〈他者〉としての朝鮮 文学的考察,（岩波書店, 2003）
- 中島敦論（みすず書房, 2005）
- 武田泰淳と竹内好（みすず書房, 2010）

== Translations ==
- Guillaume Apollinaire Complete Works, (first volume with Shintaro Suzuki), (Books Kinokuniya, 1959)
- Pierre Miquel, L' Affaire Dreyfus, Hakusuisha, 1960
- Simone Weil, Writings, (Shunjūsha, 1967- 1968）
- Michel Foucault, The Order of Things, (with Akira Sasaki Shinchosha, 1974)
- Georges Bernanos, Writings, Vol. 2, Les grands cimetières sous la lune, (Shunjūsha, 1977)
- Simone Weil, Philosophy Lectures, (with Takanori Kawamura, Jimbunshoin, 1981)
