= El Perlo de Triana =

Spanish singer, musician and poet

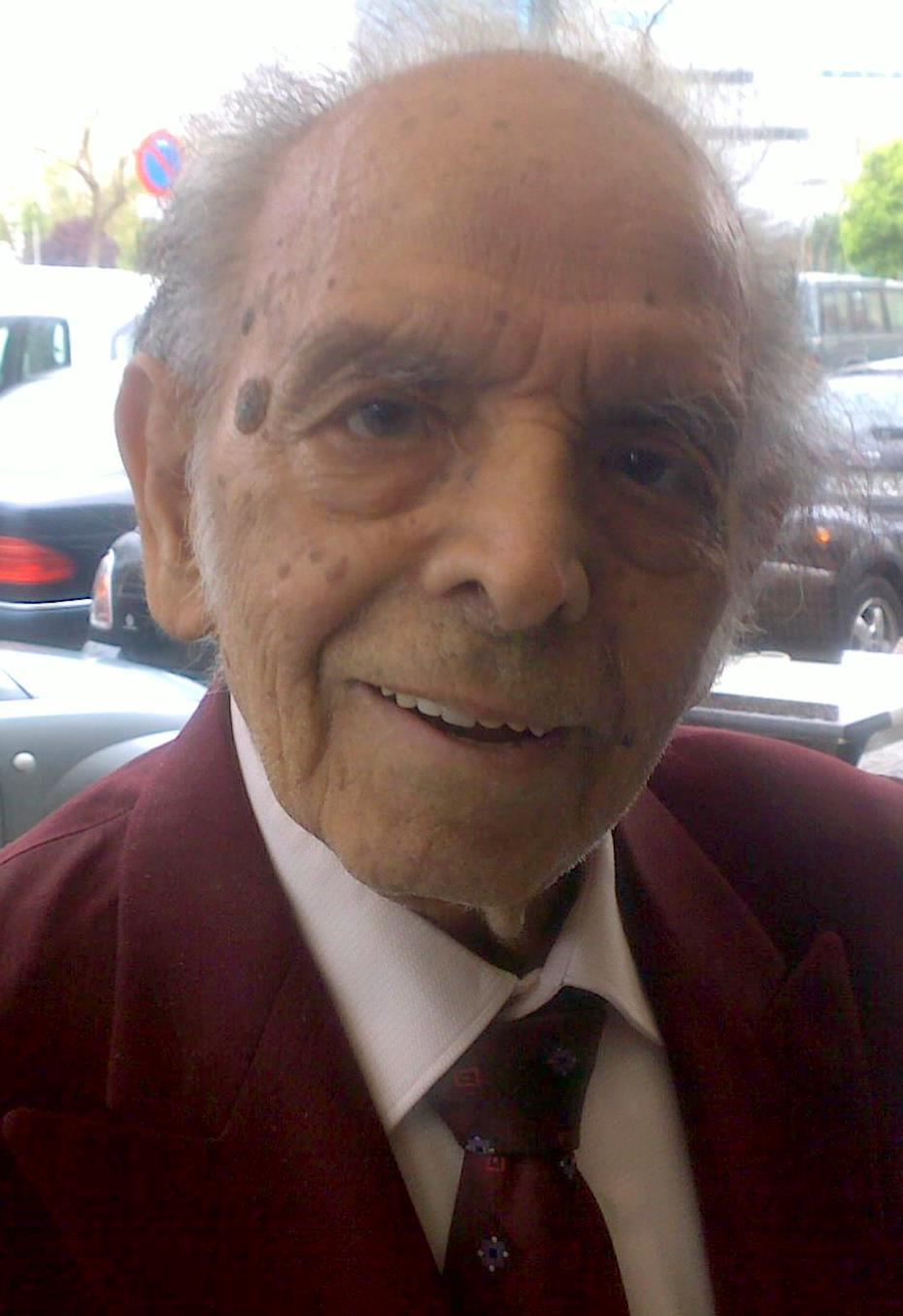
- El Perlo de Triana on 19 April 2011.
- Born: Eugenio Carrasco Morales; 1926; Málaga, Andalusia, Spain
- Died: 21 December 2013 (aged 87); Seville, Andalusia, Spain
- Occupations: Singer, musician, poet
- Years active: 1940–2013

Eugenio Carrasco Morales (1926 − 21 December 2013), better known by his stage name "El Perlo de Triana", was a Spanish singer, musician and poet.

Born in Málaga, Andalusia, he was raised in Seville. He was soon sponsored by La Niña de los Peines.

Eugenio Carrasco Morales died on 21 December 2013, aged 87, at a hospital in Seville, Andalusia.
