= Jimmy Amadie =

American jazz pianist and educator

Jimmy Amadie (January 5, 1937 – December 10, 2013) was a jazz pianist and educator from Philadelphia. He worked with Woody Herman and Mel Tormé. In 1960, his career as a musician was hindered by tendonitis. Surgery in the 1990s allowed him to return to the piano. In 1995 he released his first solo album, Always with Me. He died of lung cancer on December 10, 2013 at the age of 76.

== Books ==
- Amadie, Jimmy (January 1981). Harmonic Foundation for Jazz and Popular Music. Thornton Publishing. ISBN 0-9613035-0-6.
- Amadie, Jimmy (January 1991). Jazz Improv: How to Play It and Teach It. Thornton Publishing. ISBN 0-9613035-1-4.

== Discography ==
- 1995 Always with Me (TP)
- 1997 Savoring Every Note (TP)
- 2002 In a Trio Setting: A Tribute to Frank Sinatra (TP)
- 2003 Live at Red Rock Studio: A Tribute to Tony Bennett (TP)
- 2006 Let's Groove! (TP)
- 2007 The Philadelphia Story (TP)
- 2011 Something Special (TP)
- 2013 Live at Philadelphia Museum of Art (TP)
