= Rollo Gebhard =

- Born: Rollo Gebhard; 7 July 1921; Salzburg, Austria
- Died: 27 December 2013 (aged 92); Bad Wiessee, Germany
- Occupations: Circumnavigator and Author

Rollo Gebhard (7 July 1921 – 27 December 2013) was a German multiple single hand maritime circumnavigator and author of books.

== Life ==
His father was a private scholar. The family lived in many places around Europe. In WW II, he served in the Air Force (Luftwaffe) as a photographer. In 1956 he bought his first boat, Solveig I (Swedish: sun-strength). With this dinghy he sailed to the Red Sea. With his wooden Solveig II he crossed the Atlantic in 1963 single handed. SY Solveig III was his third boat, actually a yacht. He did two round the world cruises single handed with that from 1967 to 1970 and 1975.

In 1983 he started off to an 8-year cruise with his girl friend Angelika Zilcher (later his wife), including a term of 6 month without a stop. Soon after in 1991, he founded a Society for dolphin conservation.

From 2001 to 2003, he did a Europe-Russia-Europe cruise with his 7th boat Solveig VII, a Dutch-built motorcruiser.

He published several books about his trips and about sailing itself.
