= Edward Williams (cricketer, born 1925) =

English cricketer

Personal information
- Full name: Edward Lovell Williams
- Born: 15 September 1925; Shaftesbury, Dorset, England
- Died: 24 December 2013 (aged 88); Chester, Cheshire, England
- Batting: Left-handed
- Bowling: Right-arm fast-medium

Domestic team information
- Years: Team
- 1949: Leicestershire

Career statistics
Competition	First-class
Matches	1
Runs scored	17
Batting average	8.50
100s/50s	–/–
Top score	14
Balls bowled	78
Wickets	2
Bowling average	16.50
5 wickets in innings	–
10 wickets in match	–
Best bowling	2/33
Catches/stumpings	–/–
- Source: Cricinfo, 30 December 2012

Edward Lovell Williams (15 September 1925 – 24 December 2013) was an English cricketer. Williams was a left-handed batsman who bowled right-arm fast-medium. He was born at Shaftesbury, Dorset.

Williams made a single first-class appearance for Leicestershire against Gloucestershire at Grace Road in the 1949 County Championship. In Leicestershire's first-innings of 195 all out, Williams was run out for 10 runs. In Gloucestershire's first-innings response of 449/8 declared, Williams took figures of 2/33 with the ball. In Leicestershire's second-innings of 172 all out, he was dismissed for 3 runs by Sam Cook. Gloucestershire won the match by an innings and 82 runs. This was his only major appearance for the county.

He died at Chester, Cheshire on 24 December 2013.
