= Hans Hellbrand =

Swedish water polo player

Personal information
- Nationality: Swedish
- Born: 29 August 1925; Norrköping, Sweden
- Died: 31 December 2013 (aged 88); Borås, Sweden

Sport
- Sport: Water polo

Hans Hellbrand (29 August 1925 – 31 December 2013) was a Swedish water polo player. He competed in the men's tournament at the 1952 Summer Olympics.
