= Krzysztof Marcinkowski =

Polish footballer

Personal information
- Full name: Krzysztof Marcinkowski
- Date of birth: 29 April 1960
- Place of birth: Poznań, Poland
- Date of death: 19 December 2013 (aged 53)
- Place of death: Poland
- Height: 1.82 m (6 ft 0 in)
- Position: Midfielder

Youth career
- Lech Poznań

Senior career*
Years	Team	Apps	(Gls)
1979–1984	Lech Poznań II		
1980–1984	Lech Poznań	8	(0)
1985–1993	BKS Stal Bielsko-Biała		
1993–1995	GLKS Wilkowice		
- * Club domestic league appearances and goals

Krzysztof Marcinkowski (29 April 1960 – 19 December 2013) was a Polish footballer who primarily played as a midfielder.

Marcinkowski died on 19 December 2013, aged 53.
