= Inis L. Claude =

American international relations and organizations scholar

Inis Lothair Claude Jr. (1922 – December 23, 2013) was a leading scholar in international relations and international organizations. He held academic positions in several universities, including University of Virginia, Harvard University, University of Delaware & the University of Michigan.

== Biography ==
Claude was born in Yell County, Arkansas and completed his BA at Hendrix College in 1942. He served in the US army between 1942 and 1946. Then, he entered Harvard University and completed MA and PhD in 1947 & 1949 respectively. In 1943, he married his college sweetheart Marie Stapleton and they had two daughters and a son. He spent his final years of his life at Westminster Canterbury of the Blue Ridge, VA. One of his most notable books was The Changing United Nations, published in 1967 based on lectures delivered at the Graduate Institute of International Studies in Geneva and the National University of Mexico.

== Professorships ==
Claude taught at Harvard University before moving to University of Delaware in 1957. He taught at University of Michigan from 1958 to 1968, then at University of Virginia from 1969 until his retirement in 1988. He was also a visiting professor at the Institute of Social Studies in The Hague & Hebrew University in Jerusalem. Among Professor Claude's doctoral students was Anthony Clark Arend.
