= Judi Hofer =

American businessperson

Judith Kay Hofer
- Born: February 16, 1940; Hillsboro, Oregon, U.S.
- Died: December 14, 2013 (aged 73); Portland, Oregon, U.S.
- Education: Oregon State University; Portland State University
- Occupations: Businessperson, CEO
- Known for: President & CEO of Meier & Frank

Judith ("Judi) Kay Hofer (February 16, 1940 — December 14, 2013) was an American businesswoman. A native of Oregon, she rose to be a top executive in The May Department Stores Company, which was sold to Macy's in 2006 for a total of $1.2 billion.

== Early life ==
Hofer was born at Tuality Hospital in Hillsboro, Oregon, on February 16, 1940, to Frank E. and Helen L. Hofer. She was one of five siblings growing up on a farm. At the age of 15 she started a long career at Meier & Frank, then a Portland, Oregon-based department store chain. Hofer kept working for the company during college at Portland State University and Oregon State University.

== Career ==
Meier & Frank was sold to The May Department Stores Company in 1966. In March 1972, she was put in charge of a new young adult store inside one of the Meier & Frank department stores and was known for her fashion in Portland, Oregon. After moving to San Francisco, California, to work for the Emporium, she returned to Meier & Frank in 1978. She was named as president of Meier & Frank in August 1981, the first woman to hold that post within the May Company. As president she raised sales and renovated stores. In January 1983, Hofer was then promoted to president of May Company's California operations, taking over in March.

She was named to the board of directors of Greyhound in August 1984. Hofer was also named by Savvy magazine as one of the top 10 businesswomen while in charge of May's California division. In February 1986, Hofer was promoted to president of Famous-Barr, another department store chain owned by the May Company. She returned to Oregon and Meier & Frank in 1991. As president again, she continued to face sexism as she was not allowed to join the Waverley Country Club at the time, which excluded single women from membership. Hofer left for Boston, Massachusetts-based Filene's in 1996, where she oversaw changes in the design of the fragrance and cosmetic sections. Hofer then returned to St. Louis, Missouri, to head May's merchandising division in 2000 before retiring in 2002.

== Later life ==
Hofer returned to Oregon in 2002 when she retired. She did not marry and had no children, so in 2004 she auctioned off many in her extensive doll collection to raise money for Legacy Emanuel Children's Hospital (now Randall Children's Hospital at Legacy Emanuel) and a tutoring organization. Hofer was diagnosed with Alzheimer's disease, but died of cancer at her home in Southwest Portland on December 14, 2013, at the age of 73.
