= Thomas Ludlow Chrystie II =

American banker

Thomas L. Chrystie
- Born: Thomas Ludlow Chrystie II; May 24, 1933; New York, New York
- Died: December 24, 2013 (aged 80); Charleston, South Carolina
- Education: Columbia University (BA); New York University (MBA)
- Occupations: investment banker, real estate developer
- Known for: first CFO of Merrill inventor of the cash management account

Thomas Ludlow Chrystie II (May 24, 1933 – December 24, 2013) was an American banker who served as the first chief financial officer of Merrill and who created the cash management account.

== Early life ==
Chrystie was born on May 24, 1933, in Manhattan, the son of Thomas Witter Chrystie, a lawyer and trustee of Columbia University, and Helen Duell Chrystie. His father was a descendant of John Albert Weygand, a founding trustee of King's College, appointed in the Royal charter of October 31, 1754. He graduated from the Taft School in Watertown, Connecticut, in 1951 and from Columbia College in 1955. After college, he was hired by Merrill Lynch. He left briefly to serve in the U.S. Air Force from 1956 to 1958. He received his M.B.A. from New York University in 1960.

== Career ==
After Merrill Lynch went public in 1971, he served as its first chief financial officer in charge of planning and development. He remained at the firm until his retirement in 1988.

=== Invention of the cash management account ===
During his tenure as CFO, Chrystie is credited with developing the cash management account, in which clients could stow dividend and interest income and earn interest rates higher than those offered by banks. The account attracted 300,000 customers and provided $6 billion of new investment into Merrill, helping drive the firm's growth into a full-service financial provider. It soon became standard practice among the industry. By 1976, Merrill Lynch became the world's largest stockbroker and was the leading bank in mutual funds, commodity trading, and municipal bonds. Chrystie's invention of the C.M.A. was described by the ABA Banking Journal, "one of the top dozen or so events that changed the financial services industry."

Like his father and grandfather, Chrystie also served as a trustee of Columbia University. He was appointed in 1975.

After his retirement, he became a real estate developer. He owned the Wort Hotel and helped Aman Resorts develop Amangani in Jackson Hole, Wyoming.

== Personal life ==
He is a direct descendant of Captain John Chrystie, a United States Army officer who graduated from Columbia in 1806 and played a major role in the Battle of Queenston Heights and is the namesake of Chrystie Street in Manhattan, New York. He is also a descendant, through his great-grandfather, Dr. Thomas Mackaness Ludlow Chrystie, of Commodore James Nicholson, who served in the Continental Navy during the American Revolutionary War.

He died on December 24, 2013, at a care facility in Charleston, South Carolina.
