= Mike O'Connor (journalist) =

- Born: February 8, 1946; Germany
- Died: December 29, 2013 (aged 67); Mexico City, Mexico
- Occupation: Mexico's representative for Committee to Protect Journalists
- Spouse: Tracy Wilkinson
- Children: 2

Mike O'Connor (February 8, 1946 – December 29, 2013) was a German-born American journalist, war correspondent, and Mexico's representative for Committee to Protect Journalists (CPJ), a New York-based nonprofit organization dedicated to promote press freedom around the world. Born in Germany following World War II to Americans stationed in a refugee camp, O'Connor began his career as a journalist in the 1980s. As a foreign journalist, he covered civil wars and conflicts for NPR, The New York Times, CBS News, among others.

In 2009, he started his work at CPJ as a representative of Mexico, one of the most dangerous countries for journalists in the world. He travelled across the country investigating attacks against the press and cases about intimidation, disappearances, and murder of Mexican journalists. In 2012, he was one of the leading figures behind the promotion of a federal law signed by former President Felipe Calderón that gave the federal government more jurisdiction to investigate crimes against the press, cases traditionally reserved for local and state officials.

== Early life and career ==
Mike O'Connor was born in Germany on February 8, 1946, to Jerry and Jess O'Connor. His father was stationed there after the conclusion of World War II and was in charge of supervising the camps of people who were displaced in the conflict. As a child, O'Connor moved back and forth from U.S. to Mexico, where he learned to speak Spanish. The family fled to Mexico constantly because they believed they were on the U.S. government's radar for their sympathy and closeness with left-wing political groups. During his early life, O'Connor lived near the U.S.-Mexico border. It was much later in his life that O'Connor found out that his mother was affiliated with the Independent Labour Party and was blacklisted by the Federal Bureau of Investigation (FBI). O'Connor also lived in Mexico, a country he deeply cherished and admired, for many years of his life, including Mexico City and Monterrey. He was married to Tracy Wilkinson, the bureau chief of Mexico City for Los Angeles Times. He had two children, Sean and Gabriel; two granddaughters and four siblings.

He began his career as a reporter in the 1980s in the San Francisco area before working as a war correspondent for CBS News, covering the civil wars in El Salvador and Nicaragua, and news in the rest of Latin America. He then returned to California and worked again as a local reporter. He then went on to cover Central American affairs for The New York Times (NYT) and NPR. His investigative reporting in Haiti earned him the "Overseas Press Club" award. For the NYT, O'Connor covered the conflict and aftermath in Yugoslavia. He then went on to work for NPR and covered the Israeli–Palestinian conflict. In January 2009, he began to work for Committee to Protect Journalists (CPJ), a New York-based nonprofit organization that raises awareness and protects press freedom and journalists' rights across the world. O'Connor was Mexico's correspondent for CPJ. He often traveled to dangerous areas for journalists in Mexico to report the intimidation, disappearances and murder of Mexican journalists.

In his first major report for CPJ in 2009, he published an article about the drug-related violence and censorship of journalists in Ciudad Juárez, Chihuahua, one of the most-dangerous cities in the country that year. Among his most important works was "Silence or Death in Mexico's Press", a 43-page report that was presented to Mexico's President Felipe Calderón in September 2010. He was one of the leading figures behind the promotion of the "Law for the Protection of Human Rights Defenders and Journalists" (Spanish: Ley Para la Protección de Personas Defensoras de Derechos Humanos y Periodistas), which was passed by the Mexican government in 2012. The law gave authorities at a federal level more autonomy to prosecute crimes against the press in Mexico. CPJ research conducted by O'Connor and his colleagues showed that attacks against the press in the country were often ignored and even facilitated by corrupt law enforcement officials, especially those at the state and local levels. Mexico is one of the most dangerous countries for journalists in the world with one of the highest levels of unsolved crimes against the press.

== Death ==
O'Connor died in his sleep at home in Mexico City due to an apparent heart attack on December 29, 2013.

The United States Department of State extended their condolences; Reporters Without Borders (RWB) and Mexico City's Human Rights Commission (Spanish: Comisión de Derechos Humanos del Distrito Federal) lamented the death and recognized O'Connor's work to uncover and combat all manner of threats to the safety of Mexican journalists.
