= Paweł Zenon Woś =

Paweł Zenon Woś (December 22, 1920 – December 2, 2013) was a member of the Polish Army and the underground Polish Home Army (AK) in German-Occupied Poland during World War II. Woś was born in Warsaw, Poland in December 1920. In 1997 he, together with his parents, Paweł and Anna, were recognized as Righteous Among Nations at Yad Vashem in Jerusalem for his role in rescuing 12 Jews from the Warsaw Ghetto. Six of them perished during the Warsaw Uprising, while the rest survived to tell the story.

Woś was active in the American Polonia, fighting against anti-Polish stereotypes. He later emigrated to the United States, where he died in December 2013 at the age of 92.
