= John Rutherford (Cambridge University cricketer) =

English cricketer

Personal information
- Born: 3 September 1935; Hawkhurst, Kent, England
- Died: 25 December 2013 (aged 78)
- Source: ESPNcricinfo, 20 May 2016

John Rutherford (3 September 1935 – 25 December 2013) was an English cricketer. Rutherford was a blue for Queens' College, Cambridge, and played eleven first-class matches for Cambridge University Cricket Club between 1957 and 1958. He took ten wickets in his career, including that of the West Indies' vice-captain Clyde Walcott, during the West Indies tour of England in 1957.

== See also ==
- List of Cambridge University Cricket Club players
