= Krisztina Dobos =

Hungarian educator, economist and politician

Member of the National Assembly
- In office 13 September 1993 – 17 June 1998

Personal details
- Born: 18 July 1949 Budapest, Hungary
- Died: 12 December 2013 (aged 64) Budapest, Hungary
- Party: MDF (1988–?)
- Profession: educator, politician

Dr. Krisztina Dobos (18 July 1949 – 12 December 2013) was a Hungarian educator, economist and politician, member of the National Assembly (MP) from Budapest Regional List then the National List of the Hungarian Democratic Forum (MDF) between 1993 and 1998.

She served as Deputy Secretary of State for Education in the Cabinet of Prime Minister József Antall between 1991 and 1993. She became MP on 13 September 1993, replacing György Sándorfy, who died on 6 July 1993. She was a member of the Committee on Education, Science, Youth and Sports from 1994 to 1998.

Krisztina Dobos died on 12 December 2013, aged 64, in Budapest.
