= Wanda Ewing =

American artist (1970–2013)

- Born: 1970; Omaha, Nebraska, United States
- Died: 2013 (aged 42–43); Omaha, Nebraska, United States
- Education: University of Iowa

Wanda Ewing (1970–2013) was an artist born in Omaha, Nebraska. She considered her art to be "provocative with a political edge." A common message of her art was “I’m a proud black woman, and I’m going to be hard to ignore.” Ewing studied printmaking at San Francisco Art Institute where she received her BFA in 1997. She received her MA and MFA in printmaking at the University of Iowa in 2001 and 2002, respectively. She was a tenured professor at the University of Nebraska at Omaha, where she taught visual arts classes from 2004 to 2013. Ewing exhibited nationally and won several awards for her work.

== Art ==
=== Style and philosophy ===
Ewing was a self-described "latch hook maven." She used collage, printmaking, latch hook, and other media to create her pieces. Her work explores issues of race, gender, sexuality, beauty, and identity. Her latch hook tapestries utilize traditionally erotic poses and powerful gazes to refute common stereotypes of Black women in media. Ewing's feminism played a major role in her art. Her art uses feminist form and content to "subvert stereotypical images of women." Mainstream media often shows Black women in a negative light by sexualizing and objectifying their bodies. It was Ewing's goal to transform those portrayals into positive ones. Her art depicts Black women as "self-assured" and confident.

=== Notable exhibits ===
- "Bougie" is a series of portraits which use satire to comment upon beauty standards for Black women. This series was exhibited by the Sheldon Museum of Art in Lincoln, Nebraska. It was featured in the public television segment Next Exit: Arts in Nebraska
- "Black as Pitch, Hot as Hell" is a collection of paintings and prints showing curvy, Black women in a pin-up style. This series explores how race informs society's idea of female beauty.
- "Video Grrrlzzz" is a collection inspired by video vixen Karrine Steffans. This series of drawings shows "barely-clad black women with punching-bag heads, a metaphor for how women have been treated in the hip-hop industry." This collection was considered too controversial and was rejected from a hip-hop exhibition.

=== Shows and gallery affiliations ===
Ewing's work is included in several collections including Richard M. Ross Museum in Delaware, Tama Art University Museum in Tokyo, Japan, and San Francisco Art Institute among others. Her work has been discussed and reviewed in various publications, most notably Maria Buszek's Pin-up Grrrls: Feminism, Sexuality and Popular Culture. A selection of her printmaking was displayed at the International Print Center in New York in the mid-2000s. Her work continues to be exhibited and collected.

=== Scholarships, grants, and awards ===
- 1995-1997 Undergraduate Merit Award Scholarship from San Francisco Art Institute
- 1999 – 2002 Graduate Opportunity Fellowship for Graduate Study and Minority Tuition's scholarship from The University of Iowa School of Art and Art History
- 2003 Travel Grant from The Nebraska Women's Caucus for Art
- 2004 Recognition Award from the Roots and Crown:UNL Printmakers Exhibition
- 2006 Artist of the Year from the National Council of Negro Women, Inc.
- 2008 Purchase Award from Purdue University
- 2009 Best Visual Artist and Best 2-D Artist from Omaha Entertainment Awards, Purchase Award from the Richard M. Ross Museum, and the Young at Heart Award from the Micro Museum.
- 2010 Research Grant from the University Committee on Research and Creative Activity at University of Nebraska at Omaha
- 2011 Individual Artist Grant from The Pollock Krasner Foundation, INC.
- 2013 Individual Artist Fellowship from The Nebraska Arts Council

== Death ==
In May 2013, Ewing was diagnosed with stage four, small cell lung cancer. Wanda Ewing died December 8, 2013, at the age of 43 from complications with chemotherapy.

== Legacy ==
Ewing was an ambassador for the Omaha arts community. She worked to create a space for artists of color in Omaha's visual arts scene. The presence of artists of color in Omaha grew under her care. The Union for Contemporary Arts in Omaha, Nebraska named a gallery in her memory. Ewing was the first full-time professor of color to receive tenure in the art department of a major state university. The University of Nebraska Foundation established an art scholarship in her name.

Wanda Ewing's work continues to inspire women artists to "find their voice." Les Femmes Folles: Women in Art, an organization inspired by an exhibition she curated under the same name, continues to support women in art in her honor.
