= Ravella Venkatarama Rao =

Indian writer

Ravella Venkatrama Rao
- Born: 30 January 1927; Gokinepally, Mudigonda, Khammamet, Hyderabad State, Andhra Pradesh
- Died: 10 December 2013 (aged 86)
- Other names: Jayasri
- Occupation: writer
- Spouse: Ravella Suguna
- Children: Madhava Rao, Maheshwar Rao, Manohar Varma, Laxmana Varma

Ravella Venkatarama Rao (30 January 1927 – 10 December 2013) was a Telugu-language writer and poet. He wrote under pen-name, Jayasri.

== Life ==
He was born in Gokinepally village, Mudigonda, Khammamet (now Khammamm) Hyderabad State. He fought in the Telangana armed struggle against the Nizam and feudal lords. He was jailed for four years. He is survived by wife and four sons wife name is Ravella suguna and sons

- → Ravella Venkatarama Rao → Ravella Suguna
- → Ravella Madhava Rao → Ravella Aruna → Ravella Sri Navya, Ravella Sridivya, Ravella Sri Kavya
- → Ravella Maheshwar Rao → Ravella Vimala → Ravella Naveen
- → Ravella Manohar Varma → Ravella Kavitha → Ravella Sri Ramya, RAvella Ajay Varma, Ravella Vijay Varma
- → Ravella Laxamana Varma → Ravella Satyavathi → Ravella Adithya Varma, Ravella Abhilash Varma

== Works ==
- Ragajyotulu
- Jeevana Raagam
- Chaitanya Sravanti
- Palle Bharati

== Awards ==
He received literary awards given in memory of Jashuva, Dasaradhi and Gurajada Appa Rao.
