= William Guglielmo Niederland =

German-American physician and psychiatrist who developed survivor syndrome theory

William Guglielmo Niederland (29 August 1904 – 30 July 1993) was a German-American psychoanalyst and a pioneer in the scholarly field of psychogeography.

== Early life ==
William Guglielmo Niederland was born in Schippenbeil, East Prussia, the son of an orthodox rabbi, and in early life was exposed to both the classic Talmudic education and to the secular learning of the Realgymnasium of Würzburg, Bavaria.

== Medical career ==
After completing his medical studies at the University of Würzburg, Niederland went on to an internship and residency in medicine. For years he served as an officer of the Department of Health for the industrial region of the Ruhr.

In the 1950s Niederland began work with concentration camp survivors. He investigated and documented the particular characteristics of their reactions, coining the term "survivor syndrome" in 1961. He later worked with the Vietnam Veteran Working Group in restoring the concept of post-traumatic stress disorders to the American Psychiatric Association's Diagnostic and Statistical Manual of Mental Disorders (DSM-III) in 1980.

== Publications ==
Niederland is the author of The Schreber Case: Psychoanalytic Profile of a Paranoid Personality (1974), which is about Daniel Paul Schreber.
