= Iván Bächer =

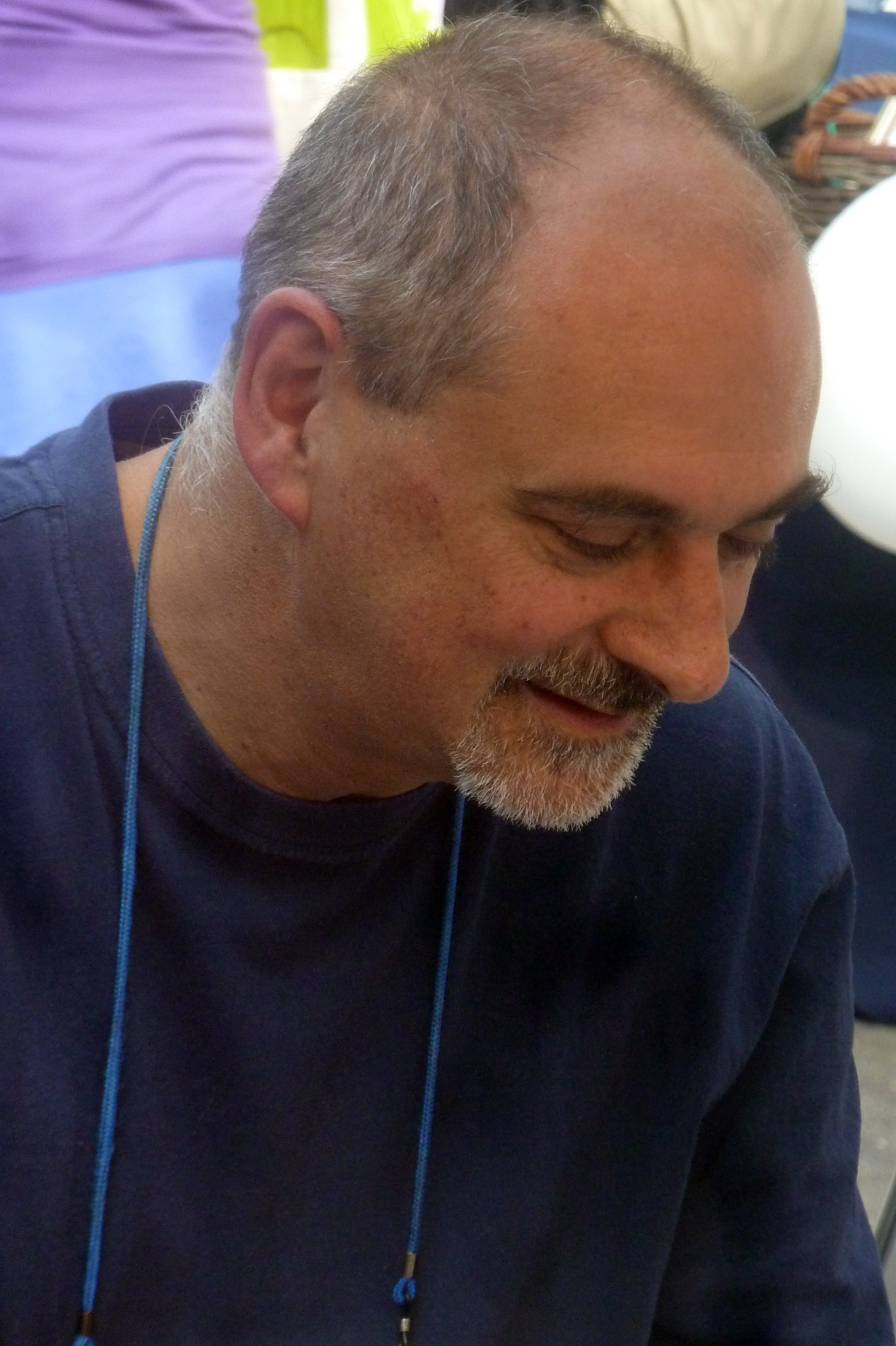
- Iván Bächer in 2012.
- Born: Iván Bächer; 25 March 1957; Budapest, Hungary
- Died: 2 December 2013 (aged 56); Budapest, Hungary
- Occupations: Writer, journalist, playwright, publicist
- Years active: 1981–2013

Iván Bächer (25 March 1957 – 2 December 2013) was a Hungarian writer, journalist, playwright and publicist.

Born in Budapest, Bächer wrote as a critic for the Hungarian daily newspaper Népszabadság. He also published several volumes of short stories and novellas. One of his stories was the inspiration for the television opera Bekerítve of István Láng in 1990, directed by György Molnár and became a film.

In the summer of 2009, he made waves with a piece in which he harshly criticised the MSZP-SZDSZ government, accusing them of corruption and concluding that he should vote for the "fascists". The article was published by Magyar Hírlap without the author's permission.

Iván Bächer died following a serious illness on 2 December 2013, aged 56, at a Budapest hospital.
