= Konstantin Melgunov =

Russian sailor

Personal information
- Nationality: Russian
- Born: 18 December 1926; Moscow, Russia
- Died: 18 December 2013 (aged 87)

Sport
- Sport: Sailing

Konstantin Melgunov (18 December 1926 – 18 December 2013) was a Russian sailor. He competed at five consecutive Olympics, starting with the 1952 Summer Olympics.
