= Frank Magleby =

American painter and educator

- Born: Francis R. Magleby; March 22, 1928; Idaho Falls, Idaho, U.S.
- Died: December 17, 2013 (aged 85)
- Education: Brigham Young University; Art Students League of New York; Columbia University
- Occupation: Painter
- Spouse: Mildred Elizabeth Boise
- Children: 5
- Relatives: Dean Fausett (maternal uncle)

Frank Magleby (March 22, 1928 – December 17, 2013) was an American painter and educator. He taught Art at Brigham Young University for 35 years, and he designed murals in the Nauvoo Illinois Temple.

== Life ==
Magleby was born on March 22, 1928, in Idaho Falls, Idaho. His maternal uncle, Dean Fausett, was a painter. Magleby graduated from Brigham Young University, where he earned a bachelor's degree in 1950 and a master's degree in 1952. He attended the Art Students League of New York, and he received a doctor of education from Columbia University in 1969.

Magleby taught Art at Brigham Young University from 1959 to 1994. He was also a painter, and he did many landscape paintings for the Church of Jesus Christ of Latter-day Saints. In 2001, Magleby designed murals in the Nauvoo Illinois Temple alongside Gary Smith, Jim Christiansen, Doug Fryer, Chris Young, and Robert Marshall. Some of his artwork was acquired by the Springville Museum of Art.

Magleby was a member of LDS Church, and he married Mildred Elizabeth Boise in the Salt Lake Temple in 1956. They resided in Provo, Utah, with their five children. Magleby died on December 17, 2013.
