= Junji Kunishige =

Japanese scholar and translator

- 國重 純二
- Born: January 20, 1942
- Died: December 14, 2013 (aged 71)
- Known for: Scholar and translator of American literature

Academic background
- Education: Kagawa Prefectural Takamatsu High School
- Alma mater: Tokyo University

Junji Kunishige (國重 純二, Kunishige Junji; January 20, 1942 – December 14, 2013) was a Japanese scholar and translator of American literature.

== Life and career ==
A repatriate from Manchukuo, he graduated from Kagawa Prefectural Takamatsu High School in Takamatsu, Kagawa Prefecture, and in 1966 from Tokyo University's Literature Department, School of English Literature. After giving up his Ph.D study in 1972 at Tokyo University, he began teaching at the College of Liberal Arts of Chiba University, where he became an assistant professor in 1974, transferring a year later to Tokyo Metropolitan University, also as an assistant professor. In 1986 he became an assistant professor at The College of Liberal Arts of Tokyo University, before becoming a professor in 1992.

From 1998 he was for two years chairperson of the American Literature Society of Japan, and from 1999, also for two years, chairperson of the English Literary Society of Japan. After retiring in 2001, he was named professor emeritus of Tokyo University, and professor at Tsurumi University. In 2012 he retired. On December 14, 2013 he died from hepatocellular carcinoma.

== Editor ==
- アメリカ文学ミレニアム ("A Millennium of American Literature"), Vol. 1-2, Nanundo, 2001

== Translations ==
- William Inge, さようなら、ミス・ワイコフ ("Good Luck, Miss Wyckoff"), Shinchosha, 1972
- Alan White, 埋葬の土曜日 ("The Long Day's Dying"; American title: "Death Finds the Day") Rippu Shobo, 1974
- Van Wyck Brooks, アメリカ成年期に達す ほか ("America’s Coming-of-Age and others")『アメリカ古典文庫』研究社、1975
- Wilson McCarthy, S・S特命部隊 ("The Detail"), Rippu Shobo, 1980
- John Barth, キマイラ ("Chimera"), Shinchosha, 1980
- MacDonald Harris『ヘミングウェイのスーツケース』新潮社 1991 のち文庫
- Nathaniel Hawthorne Complete Short Stories, 1-2 Nanundo, 1994
- Suki Kim, 通訳/インタープリター ("The Interpreter"), Shueisha, 2007
