= Ray Weeks =

English cricketer

Personal information
- Full name: Raymond Thomas Weeks
- Born: 30 April 1930; Camborne, Cornwall, England
- Died: 2 December 2013 (aged 83); Camborne, Cornwall, England
- Batting: Right-handed
- Bowling: Left-arm orthodox spin
- Role: Bowler

Domestic team information
- Years: Team
- 1950–57: Warwickshire
- First-class debut: 21 June 1950 Warwickshire v Cambridge University
- Last First-class: 7 May 1957 Warwickshire v Worcestershire

Career statistics
Competition	FC
Matches	107
Runs scored	1,051
Batting average	10.00
100s/50s	0/1
Top score	51
Balls bowled	17,476
Wickets	236
Bowling average	26.26
5 wickets in innings	8
10 wickets in match	0
Best bowling	7/70
Catches/stumpings	42/–
- Source: CricketArchive, 16 August 2015

Raymond Thomas Weeks (30 April 1930 – 2 December 2013) was an English cricketer who played first-class cricket for Warwickshire between 1950 and 1957 and took 94 wickets with his left-arm spin bowling in the County Championship winning season of 1951. He was born and died at Camborne, Cornwall.

Weeks played in Minor Counties cricket for Cornwall from 1947. Recruited by Warwickshire for a trial period in 1950, he took five Cambridge University wickets in the first innings of his first match for 42 runs. He was a regular member of the Championship-winning team of 1951 and the junior spinner to the long-established Eric Hollies; he was awarded his county cap for his contribution to the county's success that year. He bowled more than 1000 overs in the season and conceded only just over 2000 runs, and his 94 wickets came at a bowling average of 21.75. His best bowling figures of the season, which were also the best of his first-class career, were uncharacteristically expensive: he took seven for 70 against Nottinghamshire, the wickets and runs coming in just 12.4 overs. Unlike Hollies, whose batting was all but non-existent, Weeks made occasional useful runs as well, and he passed 50 once, an innings of 51 again in the 1951 season, against the Combined Services.

Weeks was not, however, able to sustain his 1951 form into other seasons. He played regularly through most of the 1952 season, but his wicket tally dropped by almost a half to 48 and the cost of them rose; he was dropped from the team halfway through the 1953 season. Eight of his 24 wickets in the 1953 season came in two matches he played for the Marylebone Cricket Club, his only first-class games that were not for Warwickshire. He played only in Warwickshire's non-Championship matches in 1954, There was a small return to form and favour in 1955 and 1956, but his wickets were costing more than 30 runs apiece, and after a single game in 1957 he left the Warwickshire staff.

From 1960 to 1965, Weeks appeared again in Minor Counties matches for Cornwall, often batting in the middle order as well as bowling; all 17 games that he played in this period were home matches in Cornwall.
