= Malena Alvarado =

Venezuelan actress and author

- Born: María Elena Alvarado Carrasco; 26 June 1954; Caracas, Capital District, Venezuela
- Died: 26 December 2013 (aged 59); Caracas, Capital District, Venezuela
- Other names: María Alvarado
- Occupation(s): Actress, author
- Years active: 1981–2013
- Website: malenaalvarado.com (in Spanish)

María Elena Alvarado Carrasco (26 June 1954 – 26 December 2013), better known by her stage name Malena Alvarado, was a Venezuelan actress and author, whose career lasted over three decades.

Born in Caracas, Alvarado began her acting career in 1981 and appeared in film, television and stage roles.

Malena Alvarado died of complications following surgery on 26 December 2013, aged 59, in her hometown of Caracas, Capital District.
