= Cycling at the 1952 Summer Olympics – Men's individual road race =

Men's individual road race at the Games of the XV Olympiad
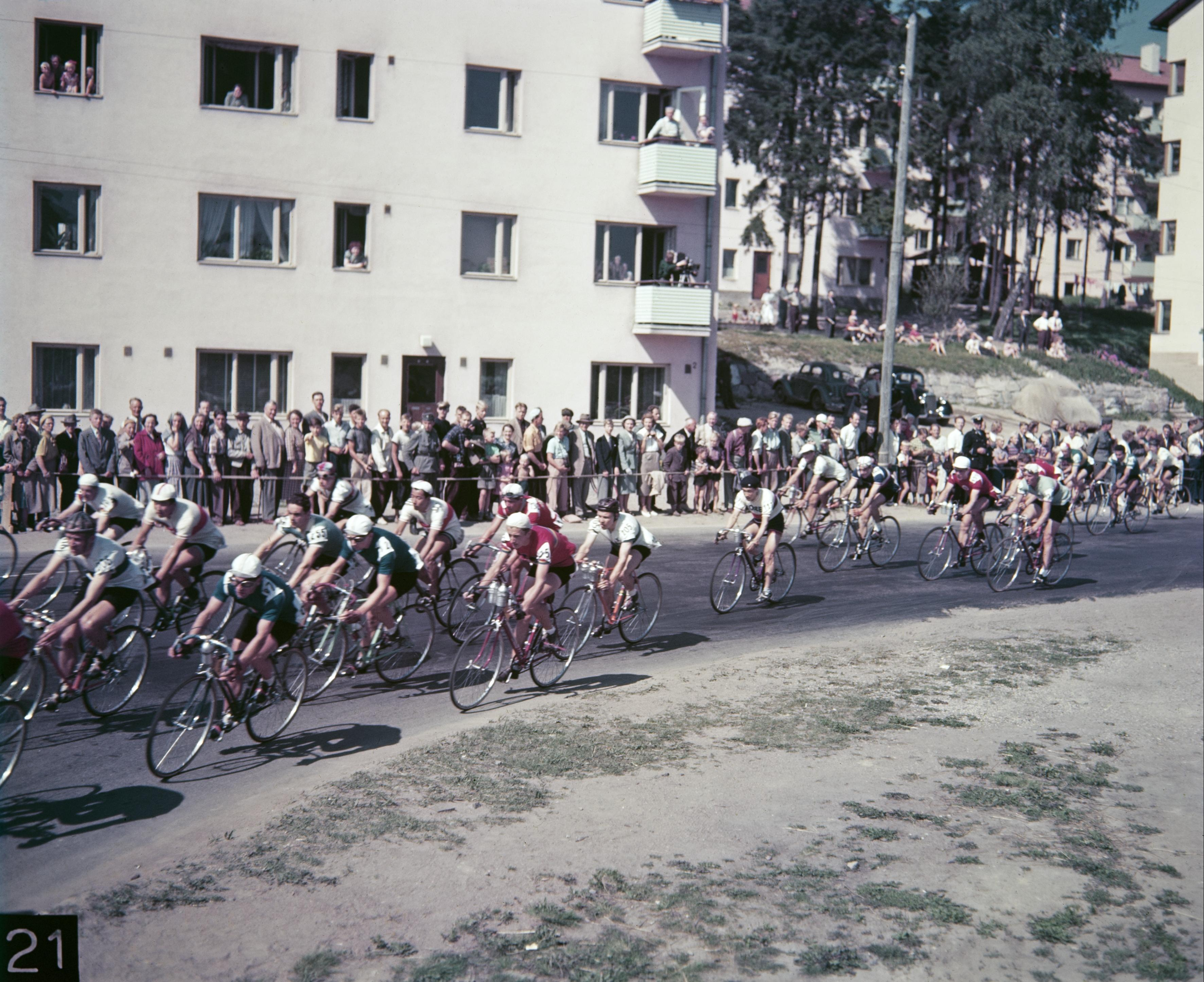
- The race
- Venue: Käpylä, Finland
- Date: 2 August 1952
- Competitors: 111 from 30 nations
- Winning time: 5:06:03.4

Medalists
1st place, gold medalist(s)		André Noyelle; Belgium
2nd place, silver medalist(s)		Robert Grondelaers; Belgium
3rd place, bronze medalist(s)		Edi Ziegler; Germany

The men's individual road race at the 1952 Summer Olympics was held on 2 August, the 2nd last day of the Olympics on an 11,2 km course running counter-clockwise from Käpylä through Pakila and Maunula and back to Käpylä. The course was circled seventeen times, so the total length of the competition was 190,4 km. About half of the road was hard-surfaced, the other half sand-surfaced. There were 154 entries from 31 nations and 111 participants from 30 nations. Each nation could enter up to four cyclists; nations entering at least three cyclists had the scores of their best three finishers summed for the team road race event. The individual event was won by André Noyelle of Belgium, the nation's first victory in the men's individual road race. His teammate Robert Grondelaers took silver. Edi Ziegler earned Germany's first medal in the event since 1896 with his bronze.

== Background ==
This was the fourth appearance of the event, previously held in 1896 and then at every Summer Olympics since 1936. It replaced the individual time trial event that had been held from 1912 to 1932 (and which would be reintroduced alongside the road race in 1996). France had won the last two Olympic road races. Gianni Ghidini of Italy was the 1951 world champion.

Japan, Romania, the Soviet Union, and Vietnam each made their debut in the men's individual road race. Great Britain made its fourth appearance in the event, the only nation to have competed in each appearance to date.

== Competition format and course ==
The mass-start race was on a course that covered 17 laps of an 11.2 kilometres circuit on Koskelantie Street in Käpylä, for a total of 190.4 kilometres. The course was "not overly difficult in terms of climbs, but had few flat sections, consisting of rolling hills throughout." Lapped cyclists were eliminated and could not finish.

== Schedule ==
All times are Eastern European Summer Time (UTC+3)

Date	Time	Round
Saturday, 2 August 1952	11:00	Final

== Results ==
Mårtensson made an early attack, taking a 45-second lead during lap 6, but was caught by the peloton in lap 8. By halfway, there was a clear lead group of nine cyclists. The Belgian riders Noyelle, Grondelaers, and Victor broke away during lap 11, with Ziegler and Maenan joining them. Maenan fell away from the front pack at lap 14. Noyelle made his break at the start of lap 17, taking an easy lead to win the race. Grondelaers separated from the other two remaining leaders with five kilometres to go, taking silver. The bronze came down to a sprint between Ziegler and Victor, with the German winning to prevent a Belgian medal sweep.

Behind the lead pack, a bad crash in lap 9 resulted in about 20 cyclists falling, with many unable to continue due to damage to their bicycles. The remaining second group of 11 cyclists continued until lap 15, when Bruni separated into clear fifth place and the other 10 cyclists finished close together.

Rank	Cyclist	Nation	Time
1st place, gold medalist(s)	André Noyelle	Belgium	5:06:03.4
2nd place, silver medalist(s)	Robert Grondelaers	Belgium	5:06:51.2
3rd place, bronze medalist(s)	Edi Ziegler	Germany	5:07:47.5
4	Lucien Victor	Belgium	5:07:52.0
5	Dino Bruni	Italy	5:10:54.0
6	Vincenzo Zucconelli	Italy	5:11:16.5
7	Gianni Ghidini	Italy	5:11:16.8
8	Oskar Zeissner	Germany	5:11:18.5
9	Hans Andresen	Denmark	5:11:18.5
10	Arend van 't Hoft	Netherlands	5:11:19.0
11	André Moes	Luxembourg	5:11:19.0
12	Jacques Anquetil	France	5:11:19.0
13	Alfred Tonello	France	5:11:20.0
14	Roger Ludwig	Luxembourg	5:11:20.0
15	Bruno Monti	Italy	5:11.35.0
16	Yngve Lundh	Sweden	5:12:15.2
17	Rolf Graf	Switzerland	5:12:45.3
18	Stig Mårtensson	Sweden	5:13:00.0
19	Jørgen Frank Rasmussen	Denmark	5:14:09.4
20	Josef Schraner	Switzerland	5:15:06.1
21	Allan Carlsson	Sweden	5:16:19.1
22	Jan Plantaz	Netherlands	5:16:19.1
23	Claude Rouer	France	5:16:19.1
24	Odd Berg	Norway	5:17:30.2
25	Erling Kristiansen	Norway	5:17:30.2
26	Desmond Robinson	Great Britain	5:18:08.9
27	Brian Robinson	Great Britain	5:18:08.9
28	Lorang Christiansen	Norway	5:20:01.3
29	Constantin Stănescu	Romania	5:20:01.4
30	Alois Lampert	Liechtenstein	5:20:06.6
31	Graham Vines	Great Britain	5:22:33.2
32	Donald Sheldon	United States	5:22:33.3
33	Virgilio Pereyra	Uruguay	5:22:33.4
34	Peter Pryor	Australia	5:22:33.5
35	Jim Nevin	Australia	5:22:33.6
36	Thomas O'Rourke	United States	5:22:33.7
37	Wedell Østergaard	Denmark	5:22:34.1
38	Luis Angel de los Santos	Uruguay	5:22:34.3
39	Hugo Machado	Uruguay	5:23:33.7
40	Yevgeny Klevtsov	Soviet Union	5:23:34.0
41	Marin Niculescu	Romania	5:23:34.1
42	Raino Koskenkorva	Finland	5:23:34.6
43	Ewald Hasler	Liechtenstein	5:23:34.8
44	Victor Georgescu	Romania	5:24:27.5
45	Ángel Romero	Mexico	5:24:33.9
46	Petar Georgiev	Bulgaria	5:24:34.0
47	Luu Quan	Vietnam	5:24:34.1
48	Paul Maue	Germany	5:24:44.5
49	Adrie Voorting	Netherlands	5:24:44.6
50	Fausto Lurati	Switzerland	5:24:58.0
51	Nicolas Morn	Luxembourg	5:26:25.0
52	Helge Hansen	Denmark	5:27:08.8
—	Ken Caves	Australia	DNF
—	Peter Nelson	Australia	DNF
—	Walter Bortel	Austria	DNF
—	Franz Wimmer	Austria	DNF
—	Arthur Mannsbarth	Austria	DNF
—	Rik Van Looy	Belgium	DNF
—	Boyan Kotsev	Bulgaria	DNF
—	Ilya Velchev	Bulgaria	DNF
—	Milcho Rosev	Bulgaria	DNF
—	Hernán Masanés	Chile	DNF
—	Héctor Droguett	Chile	DNF
—	Héctor Mellado	Chile	DNF
—	Hugo Miranda	Chile	DNF
—	Jan Veselý	Czechoslovakia	DNF
—	Karel Nesl	Czechoslovakia	DNF
—	Milan Perič	Czechoslovakia	DNF
—	Stanislav Svoboda	Czechoslovakia	DNF
—	Paul Backman	Finland	DNF
—	Paul Nyman	Finland	DNF
—	Ruben Forsblom	Finland	DNF
—	Roland Bezamat	France	DNF
—	Walter Becker	Germany	DNF
—	Leslie Ingman	Great Britain	DNF
—	István Lang	Hungary	DNF
—	István Schillerwein	Hungary	DNF
—	Lajos Látó	Hungary	DNF
—	Raj Kumar Mehra	India	DNF
—	Netai Bysack	India	DNF
—	Pradip Bode	India	DNF
—	Suprovat Chakravarty	India	DNF
—	Kihei Tomioka	Japan	DNF
—	Masazumi Tajima	Japan	DNF
—	Tadashi Kato	Japan	DNF
—	Tamotsu Chikanari	Japan	DNF
—	Gwon Ik-Hyeon	South Korea	DNF
—	Im Sang-Jo	South Korea	DNF
—	Kim Ho-Sun	South Korea	DNF
—	Jean Schmit	Luxembourg	DNF
—	Francisco Lozano	Mexico	DNF
—	Julio Cepeda	Mexico	DNF
—	Ricardo García	Mexico	DNF
—	Jules Maenen	Netherlands	DNF
—	Muhammad Naqi Mallick	Pakistan	DNF
—	Imtiaz Bhatti	Pakistan	DNF
—	Petre Nuță	Romania	DNF
—	George Estman	South Africa	DNF
—	Alfred Swift	South Africa	DNF
—	Robert Fowler	South Africa	DNF
—	Anatoly Kolesov	Soviet Union	DNF
—	Nikolay Bobarenko	Soviet Union	DNF
—	Vladimir Kryuchkov	Soviet Union	DNF
—	Lars Nordwall	Sweden	DNF
—	Kobi Scherer	Switzerland	DNF
—	David Rhoads	United States	DNF
—	Ronald Rhoads	United States	DNF
—	Julio Sobrera	Uruguay	DNF
—	Chau Phuoc Vinh	Vietnam	DNF
—	Nguyen Duc Hien	Vietnam	DNF
—	Le Van Phuoc	Vietnam	DNF

== Notes ==
- Kolkka, Sulo, ed. (1952). The Official Report of The Organising Committee For The Games Of The XV Olympiad Helsinki 1952. Helsinki: The Organising Committee for the XV Olympiad. Archived from the original on 26 August 2015.
