= Cycling at the 1952 Summer Olympics – Men's team road race =

Men's team road race at the Games of the XV Olympiad
- Dates: August 2, 1952
- Competitors: from 28 nations

Medalists
1st place, gold medalist(s)		André Noyelle; Robert Grondelaers; Lucien Victor; Rik Van Looy
2nd place, silver medalist(s)		Dino Bruni; Vincenzo Zucconelli; Gianni Ghidini; Bruno Monti
3rd place, bronze medalist(s)		Jacques Anquetil; Alfred Tonello; Claude Rouer; Roland Bezamat

These are the official results of the Men's Team Road Race at the 1952 Summer Olympics in Helsinki, Finland, held on August 2, 1952 as a part of the Men's Individual Road Race. The best three performances by nation were rewarded, with twenty-seven teams competing.

== Final classification ==
RANK	NAME CYCLISTS	TEAM	TOTAL TIME
	André Noyelle; Robert Grondelaers; Lucien Victor; Rik Van Looy (—)	Belgium	15:20:46.6
	Dino Bruni; Vincenzo Zucconelli; Gianni Ghidini; Bruno Monti	Italy	15:33:27.3
	Jacques Anquetil; Alfred Tonello; Claude Rouer; Roland Bezamat (—)	France	15:38:58.1
4.	Yngve Lundh; Stig Mårtensson; Allan Carlsson; Lars Nordwall (—)	Sweden	15:41:34.3
5.	Edi Ziegler; Oskar Zeissner; Paul Maue; Walter Becker (—)	Germany	15:43:50.5
6.	Hans Andresen; Jørgen Frank Rasmussen; Wedell Østergaard; Helge Hansen (—)	Denmark	15:48:02.0
7.	André Moes; Roger Ludwig; Nicolas Morn; Jean Schmit (—)	Luxembourg	15:49:04.0
8.	Arend van 't Hoft; Jan Plantaz; Adrie Voorting; Jules Maenen (—)	Netherlands	15:52:22.7
9.	Rolf Graf; Josef Schraner; Fausto Lurati; Kobi Scherer (—)	Switzerland	15:52:49.4
10.	Odd Berg; Erling Kristiansen; Lorang Christiansen	Norway	15:55:01.7
11.	Desmond Robinson; Brian Robinson; Graham Vines; Leslie Ingman (—)	Great Britain	15:58:51.0
12.	Constantin Stănescu; Marin Niculescu; Victor Georgescu; Petre Nuță (—)	Romania	16:08:03.0
13.	Virgilio Pereyra; Luis Ángel de los Santos; Mario Machado; Julio Sobrera (—)	Uruguay	16:08:41.4

== Non-finishers ==
=== Did not finish with three riders ===
United States

- Donald Sheldon
- Thomas O'Rourke
- David Rhoads (—)
- Ronald Rhoads (—)

Australia

- Peter Pryor
- Jim Nevin
- Ken Caves (—)
- Peter Nelson (—)

Soviet Union

- Yevgeny Klevtsov
- Anatoly Kolesov (—)
- Nikolay Babarenko (—)
- Vladimir Kryushkov (—)

Finland

- Raino Koskenkorva
- Paul Backman (—)
- Paul Nyman (—)
- Ruben Forsblom (—)

Mexico

- Angel Romero
- Francisco Lozano (—)
- Julio Cepeda (—)
- Ricardo García (—)

Bulgaria

- Petar Georgiev
- Boyan Kotsev (—)
- Ilya Velchev (—)
- Milcho Rosev (—)

Vietnam

- Quan Luu
- Chau Phuoc Vinh (—)
- Nguyen Duc Hien (—)
- Van Phuoc Le (—)

Austria

- Walter Bortel (—)
- Franz Wimmer (—)
- Arthur Mannsbarth (—)

Chile

- Hernán Masanés (—)
- Héctor Droguett (—)
- Héctor Mellado (—)
- Hugo Miranda (—)

Hungary

- István Lang (—)
- István Schillerwein (—)
- Lajos Látó (—)

India

- Raj Kumar Mehra (—)
- Netai Bysack (—)
- Prodip Bose (—)
- Suprovat Chakravarty (—)

Japan

- Kihei Tomioka (—)
- Masazumi Tajima (—)
- Tadashi Kato (—)
- Tamotsu Chikanari (—)

South Korea

- Kwon Ik-Hyun (—)
- Im Jang-Jo (—)
- Kim Ho-Soon (—)

South Africa

- George Estman (—)
- Alfred Swift (—)
- Robert Fowler (—)

Czechoslovakia

- Jan Veselý (—)
- Karel Nesl (—)
- Milan Perič (—)
- Stanislav Svoboda (—)

=== Did not start with three riders ===
Liechtenstein

- Alois Lampert
- Ewald Hasler

Pakistan

- Muhammad Naqi Mallick (—)
- Imtiaz Bhatti (—)

== See also ==
- Men's Individual Road Race
