= List of teams and cyclists in the 1956 Tour de France =

List of cyclists

As was the custom since 1930, the 1956 Tour de France was contested by national and regional teams. Seven national teams were sent, with 10 cyclists each from France, Italy, Belgium, the Netherlands, Spain, Switzerland and Luxembourg/Mixed (the latter a combined team of seven Luxembourgian cyclists plus one Portuguese, one British and one Italian cyclist). France additionally sent five regional teams from 10 cyclists each, divided into Center-North East France, South East France, West France, Ile de France and South West France. In total, 120 cyclists started the race.

The winner of the three previous editions, Louison Bobet, was absent because he had surgery. There were less climbs than usual and no mountain top finishes, so cycling experts expected this edition to be too easy. No other former Tour de France winner started the race. This was the third time in history that the race started without former winners, after the initial 1903 Tour de France and the 1927 Tour de France. As Bobet was not there, the race was open, and so there were many riders thought able to win the Tour. The most favourite of these was probably Charly Gaul, who had won the 1956 Giro d'Italia, although he was in a weak team, and would also be aiming for the mountains classification.

== Start list ==
=== By team ===
France
No.	Rider	Pos.
1	Pierre Barbotin (FRA)	46
2	Gilbert Bauvin (FRA)	2
3	Louis Bergaud (FRA)	54
4	André Darrigade (FRA)	16
5	Jean Forestier (FRA)	12
6	Raphaël Géminiani (FRA)	49
7	François Mahé (FRA)	DNF
8	Jean Malléjac (FRA)	34
9	René Privat (FRA)	9
10	Antonin Rolland (FRA)	35

Italy
No.	Rider	Pos.
11	Pierino Baffi (ITA)	55
12	Agostino Coletto (ITA)	27
13	Angelo Conterno (ITA)	41
14	Nino Defilippis (ITA)	5
15	Alessandro Fantini (ITA)	48
16	Pasquale Fornara (ITA)	24
17	Pietro Giudici (ITA)	42
18	Bruno Monti (ITA)	23
19	Gastone Nencini (ITA)	22
20	Arigo Padovan (ITA)	26

Belgium
No.	Rider	Pos.
21	Jan Adriaensens (BEL)	3
22	Jean Brankart (BEL)	39
23	Alex Close (BEL)	17
24	Fred De Bruyne (BEL)	20
25	Gilbert Desmet (BEL)	21
26	Raymond Impanis (BEL)	33
27	Marcel Janssens (BEL)	32
28	Stan Ockers (BEL)	8
29	Richard Van Genechten (BEL)	45
30	André Vlayen (BEL)	DNF

Netherlands
No.	Rider	Pos.
31	Daan de Groot (NED)	15
32	Jos Hinsen (NED)	DNF
33	Jef Lahaye (NED)	86
34	Jan Nolten (NED)	28
35	Michel Stolker (NED)	DNF
36	Piet Van De Brekel (NED)	DNF
37	Léo Van Der Pluym (NED)	30
38	Wies Van Dongen (NED)	DNF
39	Gerrit Voorting (NED)	11
40	Wout Wagtmans (NED)	6

Spain
No.	Rider	Pos.
41	Federico Bahamontes (ESP)	4
42	Salvador Botella (ESP)	65
43	Miguel Bover (ESP)	74
44	Miguel Chacón (ESP)	DNF
45	Jesús Loroño (ESP)	29
46	René Marigil (ESP)	58
47	Carmelo Morales (ESP)	77
48	Miguel Poblet (ESP)	DNF
49	Bernardo Ruiz (ESP)	70
50	José Serra (ESP)	81

Switzerland
No.	Rider	Pos.
51	Werner Arnold (SUI)	87
52	Jacky Bovay (SUI)	DNF
53	Claude Frei (SUI)	64
54	Jean-Claude Grèt (SUI)	60
55	Hans Hollenstein (SUI)	DNF
56	Fausto Lurati (SUI)	DNF
57	Remo Pianezzi (SUI)	62
58	Fritz Schär (SUI)	DNF
59	Max Schellenberg (SUI)	47
60	Ernst Traxel (SUI)	DNF

Luxembourg Mixed
No.	Rider	Pos.
61	Antonio Barbosa Alves (POR)	10
62	Aldo Bolzan (ITA)	DNF
63	Marcel Ernzer (LUX)	51
64	Charly Gaul (LUX)	13
65	Edmond Jacobs (LUX)	DNF
66	Willy Kemp (LUX)	83
67	Nicolas Morn (LUX)	68
68	Brian Robinson (GBR)	14
69	Jean Schmit (LUX)	DNF
70	Jean-Pierre Schmitz (LUX)	36

France – North-East/Centre
No.	Rider	Pos.
71	Ugo Anzile (FRA)	DNF
72	Mario Bertolo (ITA)	43
73	Roger Chupin (FRA)	82
74	Adolphe Deledda (FRA)	71
75	Camille Huyghe (FRA)	80
76	Pierre Pardoën (FRA)	DNF
77	Raymond Reisser (FRA)	DNF
78	Gilbert Scodeller (FRA)	DNF
79	Pierre Scribante (FRA)	52
80	Roger Walkowiak (FRA)	1

France – South-East
No.	Rider	Pos.
81	Roger Chaussabel (FRA)	88
82	Jean Dotto (FRA)	19
83	Raymond Elena (FRA)	DNF
84	Lucien Flifel (FRA)	DNF
85	José Gil (FRA)	DNF
86	Nello Lauredi (FRA)	7
87	Jean Lerda (FRA)	57
88	Raymond Meyzencq (FRA)	69
89	Joseph Mirando (FRA)	75
90	Vincent Vitetta (FRA)	53

France – West
No.	Rider	Pos.
91	Armand Audaire (FRA)	76
92	Arthur Bihannic (FRA)	DNF
93	Roger Hassenforder (FRA)	50
94	Louis Caput (FRA)	56
95	Claude Le Ber (FRA)	59
96	Eugène Letendre (FRA)	DNF
97	Joseph Morvan (FRA)	63
98	Fernand Picot (FRA)	18
99	Maurice Quentin (FRA)	25
100	Joseph Thomin (FRA)	37

France – Île-de-France
No.	Rider	Pos.
101	Nicolas Barone (FRA)	38
102	Stanislas Bober (FRA)	DNF
103	Seamus Elliott (IRL)	DNF
104	René Fournier (FRA)	DNF
105	Raymond Hoorelbeke (FRA)	40
106	Jean Le Guilly (FRA)	DNF
107	Francis Siguenza (FRA)	44
108	Henri Sitek (FRA)	DNF
109	Jean-Claude Skerl (FRA)	72
110	Alfred Tonello (FRA)	66

France – South-West
No.	Rider	Pos.
111	Philippe Agut (FRA)	85
112	Pierre Beuffeuil (FRA)	31
113	Albert Dolhats (FRA)	78
114	Georges Gay (FRA)	DNF
115	Robert Gibanel (FRA)	73
116	Marcel Guitard (FRA)	79
117	Valentin Huot (FRA)	61
118	Maurice Lampre (FRA)	67
119	Tino Sabbadini (FRA)	84
120	Jacques Vivier (FRA)	DNF

=== By rider ===
Legend
No.	Starting number worn by the rider during the Tour
Pos.	Position in the general classification
DNF	Denotes a rider who did not finish

No.	Name	Nationality	Team	Pos.	Ref
1	Pierre Barbotin	France	France	46	
2	Gilbert Bauvin	France	France	2	
3	Louis Bergaud	France	France	54	
4	André Darrigade	France	France	16	
5	Jean Forestier	France	France	12	
6	Raphaël Géminiani	France	France	49	
7	François Mahé	France	France	DNF	
8	Jean Malléjac	France	France	34	
9	René Privat	France	France	9	
10	Antonin Rolland	France	France	35	
11	Pierino Baffi	Italy	Italy	55	
12	Agostino Coletto	Italy	Italy	27	
13	Angelo Conterno	Italy	Italy	41	
14	Nino Defilippis	Italy	Italy	5	
15	Alessandro Fantini	Italy	Italy	48	
16	Pasquale Fornara	Italy	Italy	24	
17	Pietro Giudici	Italy	Italy	42	
18	Bruno Monti	Italy	Italy	23	
19	Gastone Nencini	Italy	Italy	22	
20	Arigo Padovan	Italy	Italy	26	
21	Jan Adriaensens	Belgium	Belgium	3	
22	Jean Brankart	Belgium	Belgium	39	
23	Alex Close	Belgium	Belgium	17	
24	Fred De Bruyne	Belgium	Belgium	20	
25	Gilbert Desmet	Belgium	Belgium	21	
26	Raymond Impanis	Belgium	Belgium	33	
27	Marcel Janssens	Belgium	Belgium	32	
28	Stan Ockers	Belgium	Belgium	8	
29	Richard Van Genechten	Belgium	Belgium	45	
30	André Vlayen	Belgium	Belgium	DNF	
31	Daan de Groot	Netherlands	Netherlands	15	
32	Jos Hinsen	Netherlands	Netherlands	DNF	
33	Jef Lahaye	Netherlands	Netherlands	86	
34	Jan Nolten	Netherlands	Netherlands	28	
35	Michel Stolker	Netherlands	Netherlands	DNF	
36	Piet Van De Brekel	Netherlands	Netherlands	DNF	
37	Leo van der Pluym	Netherlands	Netherlands	30	
38	Wies van Dongen	Netherlands	Netherlands	DNF	
39	Gerrit Voorting	Netherlands	Netherlands	11	
40	Wout Wagtmans	Netherlands	Netherlands	6	
41	Federico Bahamontes	Spain	Spain	4	
42	Salvador Botella	Spain	Spain	65	
43	Miguel Bover	Spain	Spain	74	
44	Miguel Chacón	Spain	Spain	DNF	
45	Jesús Loroño	Spain	Spain	29	
46	René Marigil	Spain	Spain	58	
47	Carmelo Morales	Spain	Spain	77	
48	Miguel Poblet	Spain	Spain	DNF	
49	Bernardo Ruiz	Spain	Spain	70	
50	José Serra	Spain	Spain	81	
51	Werner Arnold	Switzerland	Switzerland	87	
52	Jacky Bovay	Switzerland	Switzerland	DNF	
53	Claude Frei	Switzerland	Switzerland	64	
54	Jean-Claude Grèt	Switzerland	Switzerland	60	
55	Hans Hollenstein	Switzerland	Switzerland	DNF	
56	Fausto Lurati	Switzerland	Switzerland	DNF	
57	Remo Pianezzi	Switzerland	Switzerland	62	
58	Fritz Schär	Switzerland	Switzerland	DNF	
59	Max Schellenberg	Switzerland	Switzerland	47	
60	Ernst Traxel	Switzerland	Switzerland	DNF	
61	Antonio Barbosa Alves	Portugal	Luxembourg Mixed	10	
62	Aldo Bolzan	Italy	Luxembourg Mixed	DNF	
63	Marcel Ernzer	Luxembourg	Luxembourg Mixed	51	
64	Charly Gaul	Luxembourg	Luxembourg Mixed	13	
65	Edmond Jacobs	Luxembourg	Luxembourg Mixed	DNF	
66	Willy Kemp	Luxembourg	Luxembourg Mixed	83	
67	Nicolas Morn	Luxembourg	Luxembourg Mixed	68	
68	Brian Robinson	Great Britain	Luxembourg Mixed	14	
69	Jean Schmit	Luxembourg	Luxembourg Mixed	DNF	
70	Jean-Pierre Schmitz	Luxembourg	Luxembourg Mixed	36	
71	Ugo Anzile	France	France – North-East/Centre	DNF	
72	Mario Bertolo	Italy	France – North-East/Centre	43	
73	Roger Chupin	France	France – North-East/Centre	82	
74	Adolphe Deledda	France	France – North-East/Centre	71	
75	Camille Huyghe	France	France – North-East/Centre	80	
76	Pierre Pardoën	France	France – North-East/Centre	DNF	
77	Raymond Reisser	France	France – North-East/Centre	DNF	
78	Gilbert Scodeller	France	France – North-East/Centre	DNF	
79	Pierre Scribante	France	France – North-East/Centre	52	
80	Roger Walkowiak	France	France – North-East/Centre	1	
81	Roger Chaussabel	France	France – South-East	88	
82	Jean Dotto	France	France – South-East	19	
83	Raymond Elena	France	France – South-East	DNF	
84	Lucien Fliffel	France	France – South-East	DNF	
85	José Gil	France	France – South-East	DNF	
86	Nello Lauredi	France	France – South-East	7	
87	Jean Lerda	France	France – South-East	57	
88	Raymond Meyzenq	France	France – South-East	69	
89	Joseph Mirando	France	France – South-East	75	
90	Vincent Vitetta	France	France – South-East	53	
91	Armand Audaire	France	France – West	76	
92	Arthur Bihannic	France	France – West	DNF	
93	Roger Hassenforder	France	France – West	50	
94	Louis Caput	France	France – West	56	
95	Claude Le Ber	France	France – West	59	
96	Eugène Letendre	France	France – West	DNF	
97	Joseph Morvan	France	France – West	63	
98	Fernand Picot	France	France – West	18	
99	Maurice Quentin	France	France – West	25	
100	Joseph Thomin	France	France – West	37	
101	Nicolas Barone	France	France – Île-de-France	38	
102	Stanislas Bober	France	France – Île-de-France	DNF	
103	Seamus Elliott	Ireland	France – Île-de-France	DNF	
104	René Fournier	France	France – Île-de-France	DNF	
105	Raymond Hoorelbeke	France	France – Île-de-France	40	
106	Jean Le Guilly	France	France – Île-de-France	DNF	
107	Francis Siguenza	France	France – Île-de-France	44	
108	Henri Sitek	France	France – Île-de-France	DNF	
109	Jean-Claude Skerl	France	France – Île-de-France	72	
110	Alfred Tonello	France	France – Île-de-France	66	
111	Philippe Agut	France	France – South-West	85	
112	Pierre Beuffeuil	France	France – South-West	31	
113	Albert Dolhats	France	France – South-West	78	
114	Georges Gay	France	France – South-West	DNF	
115	Robert Gibanel	France	France – South-West	73	
116	Marcel Guitard	France	France – South-West	79	
117	Valentin Huot	France	France – South-West	61	
118	Maurice Lampre	France	France – South-West	67	
119	Tino Sabbadini	France	France – South-West	84	
120	Jacques Vivier	France	France – South-West	DNF	
