= Road race at the Olympics =

Road race at the Olympic Games
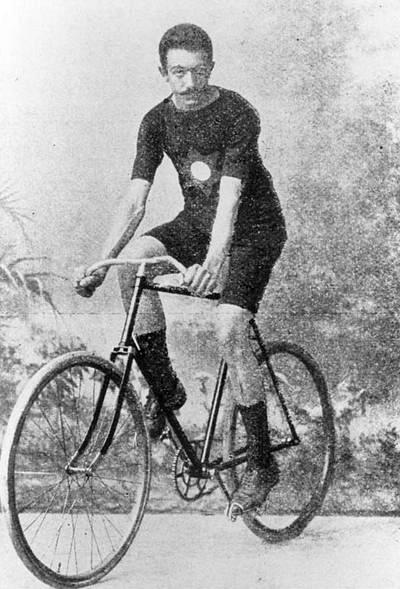
- The first road race winner, Aristidis Konstantinidis, in 1896

Overview
- Sport: Cycling
- Gender: Men and women
- Years held: Men: 1896, 1936–2024; Women: 1984–2024

Reigning champion
- Men: Remco Evenepoel (BEL)
- Women: Kristen Faulkner (USA)

The road race is one of two road bicycle racing events held at the Summer Olympics, the other being the time trial. The road race is a mass start, distinguished from the separate starts of the time trial. The men's road race was first held at the 1896, was not held again for 40 years, then has been held every Summer Games since the 1936 Summer Olympics. The women's event was first contested at the 1984 Summer Olympics, being the first women's cycling event (track events were added in 1988).

A team event, with the results of the individual event being used to place the teams, was held from 1936 to 1956 (4 times).

== Medalists ==
=== Men ===
Games	Gold	Silver	Bronze
1896 Athens	Aristidis Konstantinidis; Greece	August von Gödrich; Germany	Edward Battell; Great Britain
1936 Berlin	Robert Charpentier; France	Guy Lapébie; France	Ernst Nievergelt; Switzerland
1948 London	José Beyaert; France	Gerrit Voorting; Netherlands	Lode Wouters; Belgium
1952 Helsinki	André Noyelle; Belgium	Robert Grondelaers; Belgium	Edi Ziegler; Germany
1956 Melbourne	Ercole Baldini; Italy	Arnaud Geyre; France	Alan Jackson; Great Britain
1960 Rome	Viktor Kapitonov; Soviet Union	Livio Trapè; Italy	Willy Vanden Berghen; Belgium
1964 Tokyo	Mario Zanin; Italy	Kjell Rodian; Denmark	Walter Godefroot; Belgium
1968 Mexico City	Pierfranco Vianelli; Italy	Leif Mortensen; Denmark	Gösta Pettersson; Sweden
1972 Munich	Hennie Kuiper; Netherlands	Clyde Sefton; Australia	Not awarded
1976 Montreal	Bernt Johansson; Sweden	Giuseppe Martinelli; Italy	Mieczysław Nowicki; Poland
1980 Moscow	Sergei Sukhoruchenkov; Soviet Union	Czesław Lang; Poland	Yuri Barinov; Soviet Union
1984 Los Angeles	Alexi Grewal; United States	Steve Bauer; Canada	Dag Otto Lauritzen; Norway
1988 Seoul	Olaf Ludwig; East Germany	Bernd Gröne; West Germany	Christian Henn; West Germany
1992 Barcelona	Fabio Casartelli; Italy	Erik Dekker; Netherlands	Dainis Ozols; Latvia
1996 Atlanta	Pascal Richard; Switzerland	Rolf Sørensen; Denmark	Max Sciandri; Great Britain
2000 Sydney	Jan Ullrich; Germany	Alexander Vinokourov; Kazakhstan	Andreas Klöden; Germany
2004 Athens	Paolo Bettini; Italy	Sérgio Paulinho; Portugal	Axel Merckx; Belgium
2008 Beijing	Samuel Sánchez; Spain	Fabian Cancellara; Switzerland	Alexandr Kolobnev; Russia
2012 London	Alexander Vinokourov; Kazakhstan	Rigoberto Urán; Colombia	Alexander Kristoff; Norway
2016 Rio de Janeiro	Greg Van Avermaet; Belgium	Jakob Fuglsang; Denmark	Rafał Majka; Poland
2020 Tokyo	Richard Carapaz; Ecuador	Wout van Aert; Belgium	Tadej Pogačar; Slovenia
2024 Paris	Remco Evenepoel; Belgium	Valentin Madouas; France	Christophe Laporte; France

==== Multiple medalists ====
Rank	Cyclist	Nation	Olympics	Gold	Silver	Bronze	Total
1	Alexander Vinokourov	Kazakhstan	2000–2012	1	1	0	2

==== Medalists by country ====
Rank	Nation	Gold	Silver	Bronze	Total
1	Italy	5	2	0	7
2	Belgium	3	2	4	9
3	France	2	3	1	6
4	Soviet Union	2	0	1	3
5	Netherlands	1	2	0	3
6	Germany	1	1	2	4
7	Switzerland	1	1	1	3
8	Kazakhstan	1	1	0	2
9	Sweden	1	0	1	2
10	East Germany	1	0	0	1
10	Greece	1	0	0	1
10	Spain	1	0	0	1
10	United States	1	0	0	1
10	Ecuador	1	0	0	1
15	Denmark	0	4	0	4
16	Poland	0	1	2	3
17	West Germany	0	1	1	2
18	Australia	0	1	0	1
18	Canada	0	1	0	1
18	Colombia	0	1	0	1
18	Portugal	0	1	0	1
22	Great Britain	0	0	3	3
23	Norway	0	0	2	2
24	Latvia	0	0	1	1
24	Russia	0	0	1	1
24	Slovenia	0	0	1	1

=== Women ===
Games	Gold	Silver	Bronze
1984 Los Angeles	Connie Carpenter; United States	Rebecca Twigg; United States	Sandra Schumacher; West Germany
1988 Seoul	Monique Knol; Netherlands	Jutta Niehaus; West Germany	Laima Zilporytė; Soviet Union
1992 Barcelona	Kathryn Watt; Australia	Jeannie Longo; France	Monique Knol; Netherlands
1996 Atlanta	Jeannie Longo; France	Imelda Chiappa; Italy	Clara Hughes; Canada
2000 Sydney	Leontien Zijlaard; Netherlands	Hanka Kupfernagel; Germany	Diana Žiliūtė; Lithuania
2004 Athens	Sara Carrigan; Australia	Judith Arndt; Germany	Olga Slyusareva; Russia
2008 Beijing	Nicole Cooke; Great Britain	Emma Johansson; Sweden	Tatiana Guderzo; Italy
2012 London	Marianne Vos; Netherlands	Lizzie Armitstead; Great Britain	Olga Zabelinskaya; Russia
2016 Rio de Janeiro	Anna van der Breggen; Netherlands	Emma Johansson; Sweden	Elisa Longo Borghini; Italy
2020 Tokyo	Anna Kiesenhofer; Austria	Annemiek van Vleuten; Netherlands	Elisa Longo Borghini; Italy
2024 Paris	Kristen Faulkner; United States	Marianne Vos; Netherlands	Lotte Kopecky; Belgium

==== Multiple medallists ====
Rank	Athlete	Nation	Olympics	Gold	Silver	Bronze	Total
1	Jeannie Longo	France	1992–1996	1	1	0	2
1	Marianne Vos	Netherlands	2008–2024	1	1	0	2
3	Monique Knol	Netherlands	1988–1992	1	0	1	2
4	Emma Johansson	Sweden	2008–2016	0	2	0	2
5	Elisa Longo Borghini	Italy	2016–2020	0	0	2	2

==== Medallists by country ====
Rank	Nation	Gold	Silver	Bronze	Total
1	Netherlands	5	1	1	7
2	Australia	2	0	0	2
3	United States	2	1	0	3
4	France	1	1	0	2
4	Great Britain	1	1	0	2
6	Austria	1	0	0	1
7	Germany	0	2	0	2
7	Sweden	0	2	0	2
9	Italy	0	1	3	4
10	West Germany	0	1	1	2
11	Russia	0	0	2	2
12	Belgium	0	0	1	1
12	Canada	0	0	1	1
12	Lithuania	0	0	1	1
12	Soviet Union	0	0	1	1

=== Men's team ===
A men's team event was held for four Games—1936, 1948, 1952, and 1956. It was not a separate competition, but an event that involved the results of the individual road race. The Belgian team, winners in 1948, were unaware that there was a team competition and left London without receiving their medals. For the first three editions of the event, the times of the fastest three cyclists (out of a maximum four individual competitors) for each nation were summed. In the final edition in 1956, a point-for-place system was used instead. In 1936 and 1948, only the top three cyclists for each team were awarded medals. In 1952 and 1956, all members of the team—including the cyclist whose score did not count—were medalists.

Games	Gold	Silver	Bronze
1936 Berlin	France; Robert Charpentier; Robert Dorgebray; Guy Lapébie	Switzerland; Edgar Buchwalder; Ernst Nievergelt; Kurt Ott	Belgium; Auguste Garrebeek; Armand Putzeyse; Jean-François Van Der Motte
1948 London	Belgium; Lode Wouters; Leon De Lathouwer; Eugène Van Roosbroeck	Great Britain; Bob Maitland; Gordon Thomas; Ian Scott	France; José Beyaert; Alain Moineau; Jacques Dupont
1952 Helsinki	Belgium; André Noyelle; Robert Grondelaers; Lucien Victor; Rik Van Looy	Italy; Dino Bruni; Vincenzo Zucconelli; Gianni Ghidini; Bruno Monti	France; Jacques Anquetil; Alfred Tonello; Claude Rouer; Roland Bezamat
1956 Melbourne	France; Arnaud Geyre; Maurice Moucheraud; Michel Vermeulin; René Abadie	Great Britain; Alan Jackson; Arthur Brittain; William Holmes; Harold Reynolds	United Team of Germany; Horst Tüller; Gustav-Adolf Schur; Reinhold Pommer; Erich Hagen

==== Medalists by country ====
Rank	Nation	Gold	Silver	Bronze	Total
1	France	2	0	2	4
2	Belgium	2	0	1	3
3	Great Britain	0	2	0	2
4	Italy	0	1	0	1
4	Switzerland	0	1	0	1
6	United Team of Germany	0	0	1	1

== Intercalated Games ==
The 1906 Intercalated Games were held in Athens and at the time were officially recognised as part of the Olympic Games series, with the intention being to hold a games in Greece in two-year intervals between the internationally held Olympics. However, this plan never came to fruition and the International Olympic Committee (IOC) later decided not to recognise these games as part of the official Olympic series. Some sports historians continue to treat the results of these games as part of the Olympic canon.

Fernand Vast won the 1906 title, with France sweeping the medals as Maurice Bardonneau finished second and Edmond Luguet third.

Games	Gold	Silver	Bronze
1906 Athens	Fernand Vast (FRA)	Maurice Bardonneau (FRA)	Edmond Luguet (FRA)
