= Milan Perič =

Milan Perič may refer to:

- Milan Perič (artist) (born 1957), Czech painter and musician
- Milan Perič (cyclist) (1928–1967), Czech cyclist

== See also ==
- Milan Perić (born 1986), Serbian footballer
