= South Korea at the 1952 Summer Olympics =

- IOC code: KOR
- NOC: Korean Olympic Committee

in Helsinki
- Competitors: 19 in 6 sports
- Medals Ranked 37th: Gold 0 Silver 0 Bronze 2 Total 2

Summer Olympics appearances (overview)
- 1948; 1952; 1956; 1960; 1964; 1968; 1972; 1976; 1980; 1984; 1988; 1992; 1996; 2000; 2004; 2008; 2012; 2016; 2020; 2024

South Korea, as Korea, competed at the 1952 Summer Olympics in Helsinki, Finland.

== Medalists ==
Medal	Name	Sport	Event	Date
Bronze	Kim Sung-Jip	Weightlifting	Men's Middleweight	26 July
Bronze	Kang Jun-Ho	Boxing	Men's Bantamweight	2 August

== Results and competitors by event ==
=== Athletics ===
==== Track and road ====
Event	Athletes	Heat		Semifinal		Final	
Event	Athletes	Result	Rank	Result	Rank	Result	Rank
Men's 200 metres	Um Pal-Yong	23.0	5 (H13)	did not advance			
Men's marathon	Choi Yun-Chil					2:26:36	4
Men's marathon	Choi Chung-Sik					2:41:23	33
Men's marathon	Hong Jong-O					Did not finish	-

==== Field ====
Event	Athletes	Qualification		Final	
Event	Athletes	Result (m)	Rank	Result	Rank
Men's triple jump	Choi Yeong-Gi	14.44	18	did not advance	
Women's shot put	Choi Myeong-Suk	10.76	20	did not advance	

=== Boxing ===
Athlete	Event	Round of 32	Round of 16	Quarterfinals	Semifinals	Final	
Athlete	Event	Opposition Result	Opposition Result	Opposition Result	Opposition Result	Opposition Result	Rank
Han Soo-Ann	Flyweight	Hofmann (SAA); W TKO (R1)	Mazumdar (IND); W 3-0	Toweel (RSA); L 0-3	did not advance		
Kang Joon-Ho	Bantamweight		Nikkhah (IRI); W 3-0	Moore (USA); W 2-1	McNally (IRL); L 0-3		Bronze
Seo Byeong-Ran	Featherweight	Willommet (SUI); W 3-0	Zachara (TCH); L 0-3	did not advance			
Ju Sang-Jeom	Lightweight	Potesil (POL); L 0-3	Did not advance				

=== Cycling ===
==== Road Competition ====
Athlete	Event	Time	Rank
Kwon Ik-Hyun	Individual road race	Did Not Finish	-
Im Sang-Jo	Individual road race	Did Not Finish	-
Kim Ho-Soon	Individual road race	Did Not Finish	-
Kwon Ik-Hyun; Im Sang-Jo; Kim Ho-Soon	Team road race	Did Not Finish	-

=== Equestrian ===
Athlete	Event	Total points lost	Rank
Min Byeong-seon	Individual jumping	59.75	44

=== Weightlifting ===
Athlete	Event	Press		Snatch		Clean & Jerk		Total	Rank
Athlete	Event	Result	Rank	Result	Rank	Result	Rank	Total	Rank
Kim Hae-Nam	Men's Bantamweight (-56 kg)	80	8	95	3	120	4	295	4
Nam Su-Il	Men's Featherweight (-60 kg)	90	9	90	15	120	12	300	11
Kim Chang-Hui	Men's Lightweight (-67.5 kg)	100	8	105	6	140	2	345	4
Kim Seong-Jip	Men's Middleweight (-75 kg)	122.5	1	112.5	5	147.5	5	382.5	3

=== Wrestling ===
Men's Freestyle

Athlete	Event	Round 1	Round 3	Round 3	Round 4	Quarterfinals	Semifinals	Final
Athlete	Event	Opposition Result	Opposition Result	Opposition Result	Opposition Result	Opposition Result	Opposition Result	Opposition Result
Oh Tae-Keun	Lightweight (−67 kg)	Nettesheim (GER); W fall (16-4)	Gál (HUN); L 0-3					
