= Phuoc =

- Gender: unisex
- Language: Vietnamese

Origin
- Meaning: blessing or lucky

Phước (Vietnamese: Phước) is a common gender-neutral name originating from Vietnam. It means "blessing" or "lucky". Notable people with this name include:

== Given name ==
- Lưu Hữu Phước (1921–89), Vietnamese composer
- Lê Văn Phước (b. 1929), Vietnamese Olympic cyclist
- Ho Henh Phươc (b. 1940), Vietnamese Olympic athlete
- Hoàng Quý Phước (b. 1993), Vietnamese swimmer

== Middle name ==
- Nguyễn Phước Vĩnh Lộc (1923–2009), Vietnamese general
- Châu Phước Vĩnh (b. 1927), Vietnamese Olympic cyclist
- Crown Prince Nguyễn Phước Bảo Long (1934–2007)
- Lê Phước Tứ (b. 1984), Vietnamese footballer
- Châu Lê Phước Vĩnh (b. 1985), Vietnamese footballer
- Phạm Phước Hưng (b. 1988), Vietnamese Olympic gymnast
- Trần Phước Thọ (1993–2016), Vietnamese footballer
