= Rouer =

Rouer is a surname. Notable people with the surname include:

- Claude Rouer (1929–2021), French road cyclist
- Germaine Rouer (1897–1994), French actress
- Rhonda Rouer (fl. 2012), fiancée of American murderer Michael Dunn
