= Petar Georgiev =

Petar Georgiev may refer to:

- Petar Georgiev-Kalica (born 1951), Macedonian composer and songwriter
- Petar Georgiev (cyclist) (born 1929), Bulgarian cyclist
- Petar Georgiev (diver) (born 1961), Bulgarian diver
- Petar Georgiev (gymnast) (1965–2013), Bulgarian gymnast
- Petar Georgiev (swimmer) (born 1959), Bulgarian swimmer
- Petar Georgiev (footballer) (born 2002), Bulgarian footballer
