= Nuta =

Nuta or NUTA may refer to:

- Nuta (name)
- National Union of Tanganyika Workers, one of the trade unions in Tanzania
