= Walter Becker (disambiguation) =

Walter Becker (1950–2017) was the co-founder, guitarist, bassist and co-songwriter of American band Steely Dan.

Walter Becker may also refer to:

- Walt Becker (born 1968), American director, writer and actor
- Walter Becker (cyclist) (1932–2012), German cyclist

== See also ==
- Walter Becher (1912–2005), German Bohemian politician
