= Erling Kristiansen (cyclist) =

Norwegian cyclist

Personal information
- Born: 3 October 1923 Oslo, Norway
- Died: 25 July 2009 (aged 85) Akershus, Norway

Cycling career
- Sport: Cycling

Erling Kristiansen (3 October 1923 – 25 July 2009) was a Norwegian cyclist.

He took eight individual national championships, and fifteen team championships, representing the club IK Hero. He competed at the World Championships in 1948, 1949 and 1950, and at the Olympic Games in 1948 and 1952. At the 1948 Summer Olympics he did not finish in either event, but at the 1952 Summer Olympics he finished 25th in the individual road race and 10th in the team road race. From 1959 top 1960 he was the deputy leader of the Norwegian Cycling Federation.

He died in July 2009 in Rud, Akershus.
