= Masazumi =

- Gender: Male

Origin
- Origin: Japanese
- Meaning: Different meanings depending on the kanji used

Masazumi (written: 正純 or 正澄) is a masculine Japanese given name. Notable people with the name include:

- Masazumi Gotoda (後藤田 正純; born 1969), Japanese politician
- Masazumi Harada (原田 正純; 1934–2012), Japanese physician
- Honda Masazumi (本多 正純; 1566–1637), Japanese samurai and daimyō
- Masazumi Inada (稲田 正純; 1896–1986), Japanese general
- Masazumi Ozawa (小澤 正澄), Japanese composer, music arranger and guitarist
- Masazumi Soejima (副島 正純; born 1970), Japanese Paralympic wheelchair racer
- Masazumi Tajima (田島 正純; born 1933), Japanese cyclist
