= Voorting =

Voorting is a surname. Notable people with the surname include:

- Adrie Voorting (1931–1961), Dutch cyclist, brother of Gerrit
- Gerrit Voorting (1923–2015), Dutch cyclist
