= Héctor Droguett =

Chilean cyclist

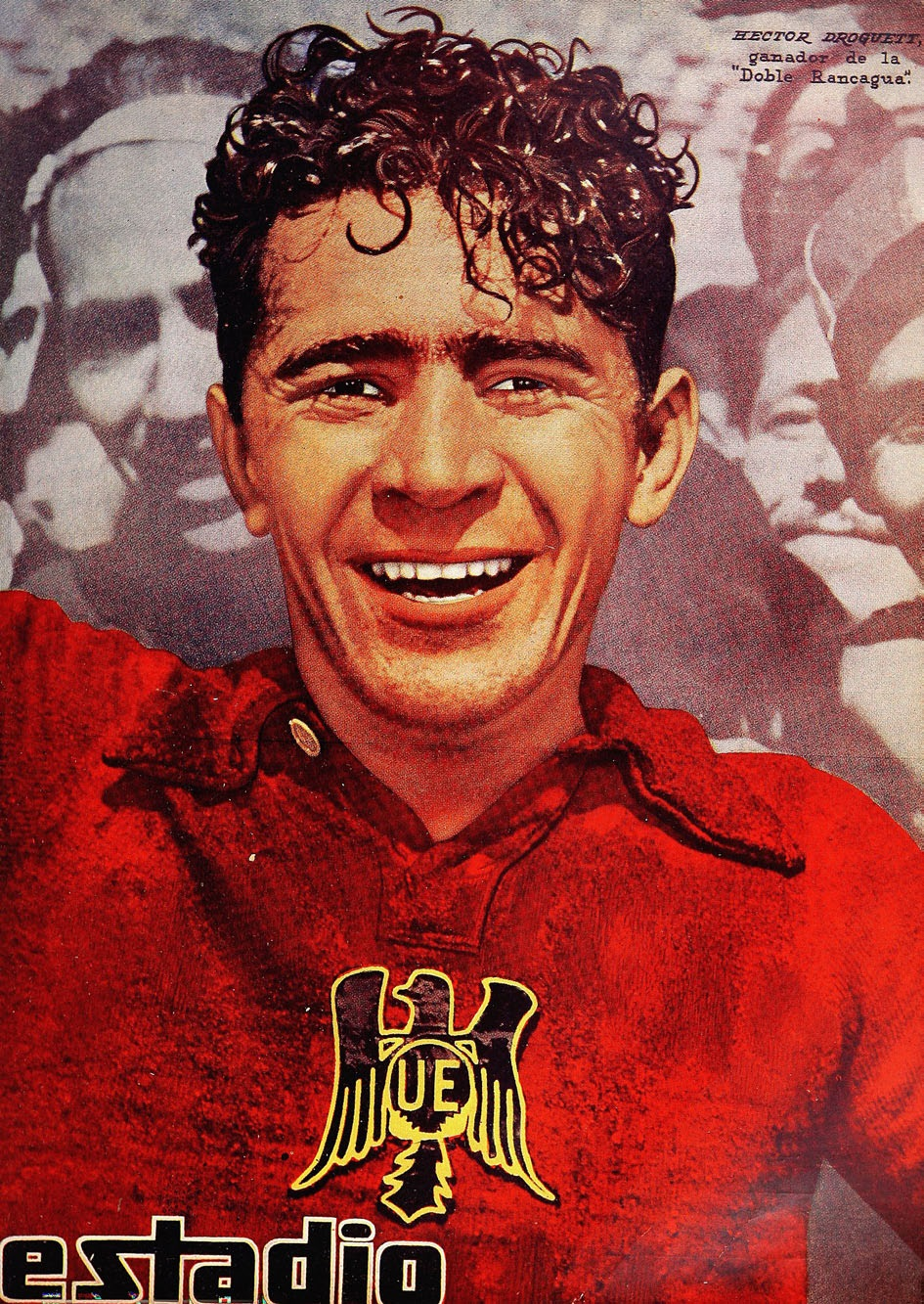

Personal information
- Born: 7 January 1925
- Died: 23 July 2004 (aged 79)

Cycling career
- Sport: Cycling

Héctor Droguett (7 January 1925 – 23 July 2004) was a Chilean cyclist. He competed in the individual and team road race events at the 1952 Summer Olympics.
