= Kobi Scherer =

Swiss cyclist

Personal information
- Born: 20 April 1931
- Died: 1970 (aged 38–39)

Cycling career
- Sport: Cycling

Kobi Scherer (20 April 1931 – 1970) was a Swiss cyclist. He competed in the individual and team road race events at the 1952 Summer Olympics.
