= Stig Mårtensson (cyclist) =

Swedish cyclist

Personal information
- Born: 1 February 1923 Skultuna, Sweden
- Died: 1 August 2010 (aged 87) Stockholm, Sweden

Cycling career
- Sport: Cycling

Stig Mårtensson (1 February 1923 – 1 August 2010) was a Swedish racing cyclist. He competed in the individual and team road race events at the 1952 Summer Olympics.
