= Jørgen Frank Rasmussen =

Danish cyclist (1930–2009)

Personal information
- Full name: Jørgen Frank Rasmussen
- Born: 21 November 1930 Rødovre, Denmark
- Died: 10 June 2009 (aged 78)

Cycling career
- Sport: Cycling

Jørgen Frank Rasmussen (21 November 1930 – 10 June 2009) was a Danish cyclist. He competed in the individual and team road race events at the 1952 Summer Olympics.
