= Iatrou =

Iatrou is a surname. Notable people with the surname include:

- Miltiades Iatrou (fl. 1896), Greek cyclist
- Mildred Iatrou Morgan, American sound editor and audio engineer
