= Raino Koskenkorva =

Finnish cyclist

Personal information
- Born: 6 December 1926 Kotka, Finland
- Died: 24 December 2013 (aged 87)

Cycling career
- Sport: Cycling

Raino Koskenkorva (6 December 1926 – 24 December 2013) was a Finnish cyclist. He competed in the individual and team road race events at the 1952 Summer Olympics.
