= Hugo Miranda (cyclist) =

Chilean cyclist

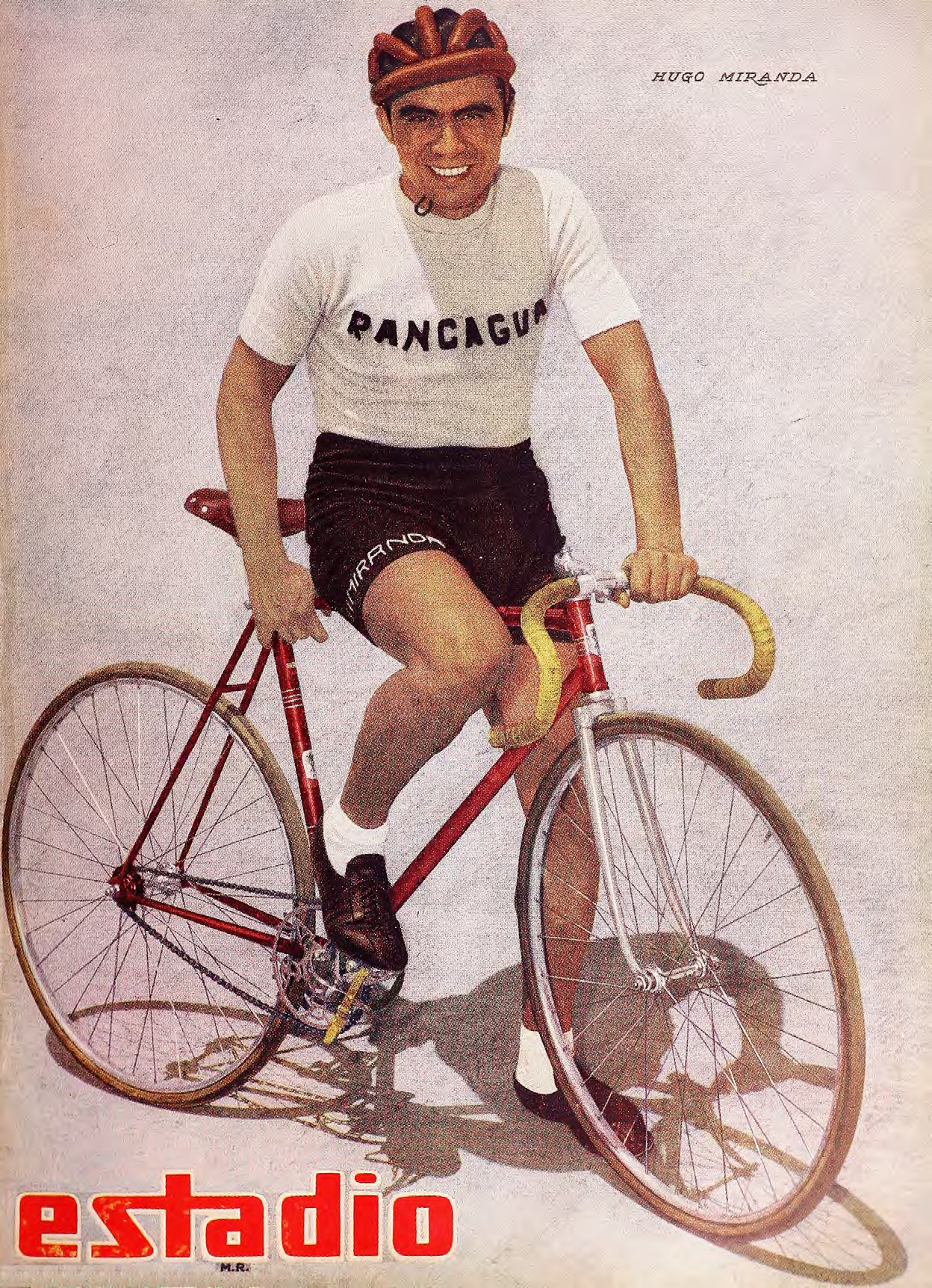

Personal information
- Born: 6 December 1929
- Died: 9 September 1994 (aged 64)

Cycling career
- Sport: Cycling

Hugo Miranda (6 December 1929 – 9 September 1994) was a Chilean cyclist who competed in the individual and team road race events at the 1952 Summer Olympics.
