= Graham Vines =

British cyclist

Personal information
- Born: 9 October 1930 (age 96) London, England

Cycling career
- Sport: Cycling

Graham Vines (born 9 October 1930) is a British cyclist. He competed in the individual and team road race events at the 1952 Summer Olympics.
