= Wedell Østergaard =

Danish cyclist

Personal information
- Full name: Wedell Østergaard
- Born: 7 May 1924 Gentofte, Denmark
- Died: 21 March 1995 (aged 70) Gentofte, Denmark

Cycling career
- Sport: Cycling

Wedell Østergaard (7 May 1924 – 21 March 1995) was a Danish cyclist. He competed in the individual and team road race events at the 1952 Summer Olympics.
