= Nuta (name) =

Nuta, Nuța or Nuță may refer to

- Nudie Cohn (born Nuta Kotlyarenko; 1902–1984), Ukrainian-born American tailor
- Nuța Olaru (born 1970), Romanian American long-distance runner
- Petre Nuță (1928–?), Romanian cyclist
