= Oskar Zeissner =

German cyclist

Personal information
- Born: 3 November 1928 Niederwerrn, Germany
- Died: 17 May 1997 (aged 68) Niederwerrn, Germany

Cycling career
- Sport: Cycling

Oskar Zeissner (3 November 1928 – 17 May 1997) was a German cyclist. He competed in the individual and team road race events at the 1952 Summer Olympics.
