= Odd Berg (cyclist) =

Norwegian cyclist (1923–2021)

Personal information
- Born: 8 November 1923 Trondheim, Norway
- Died: 19 May 2021 (aged 97)

Cycling career
- Sport: Cycling

Odd Berg (8 November 1923 – 19 May 2021) was a Norwegian cyclist. He competed in the individual and team road race events at the 1952 Summer Olympics. He won the Norwegian National Road Race Championship in 1951, 1952 and 1955.
