= Nguyễn Đức Hiền =

Vietnamese cyclist

Personal information
- Born: 14 November 1925 Châu Đốc, Vietnam

Cycling career
- Sport: Cycling

Nguyễn Đức Hiền (born 14 November 1925) is a Vietnamese cyclist. He competed in the individual and team road race events at the 1952 Summer Olympics.
