= Julio Sobrera =

Uruguayan cyclist

Personal information
- Born: 11 July 1927 Montevideo, Uruguay

Cycling career
- Sport: Cycling

Julio Sobrera (born 11 July 1927) is a Uruguayan cyclist. He competed in the individual and team road race events at the 1952 Summer Olympics.
