= Constantin Stănescu =

Romanian cyclist

Personal information
- Born: 9 May 1928

Cycling career
- Sport: Cycling

Constantin Stănescu (born 9 May 1928) is a Romanian cyclist. He competed in the individual and team road race events at the 1952 Summer Olympics.
