= Anders Ruben Forsblom =

Finnish cyclist (1931–2023)

Personal information
- Born: 24 June 1931 Porvoo, Finland
- Died: 18 June 2023 (aged 91) Raseborg, Finland

Cycling career
- Sport: Cycling

Anders Ruben Forsblom (24 June 1931 – 18 June 2023) was a Finnish cyclist. He won the Finnish national road race title in 1953 and 1954. He also competed in the individual and team road race events at the 1952 Summer Olympics.
