= Jerlochovice =

Coordinates: 49°42′47″N 17°53′14″E

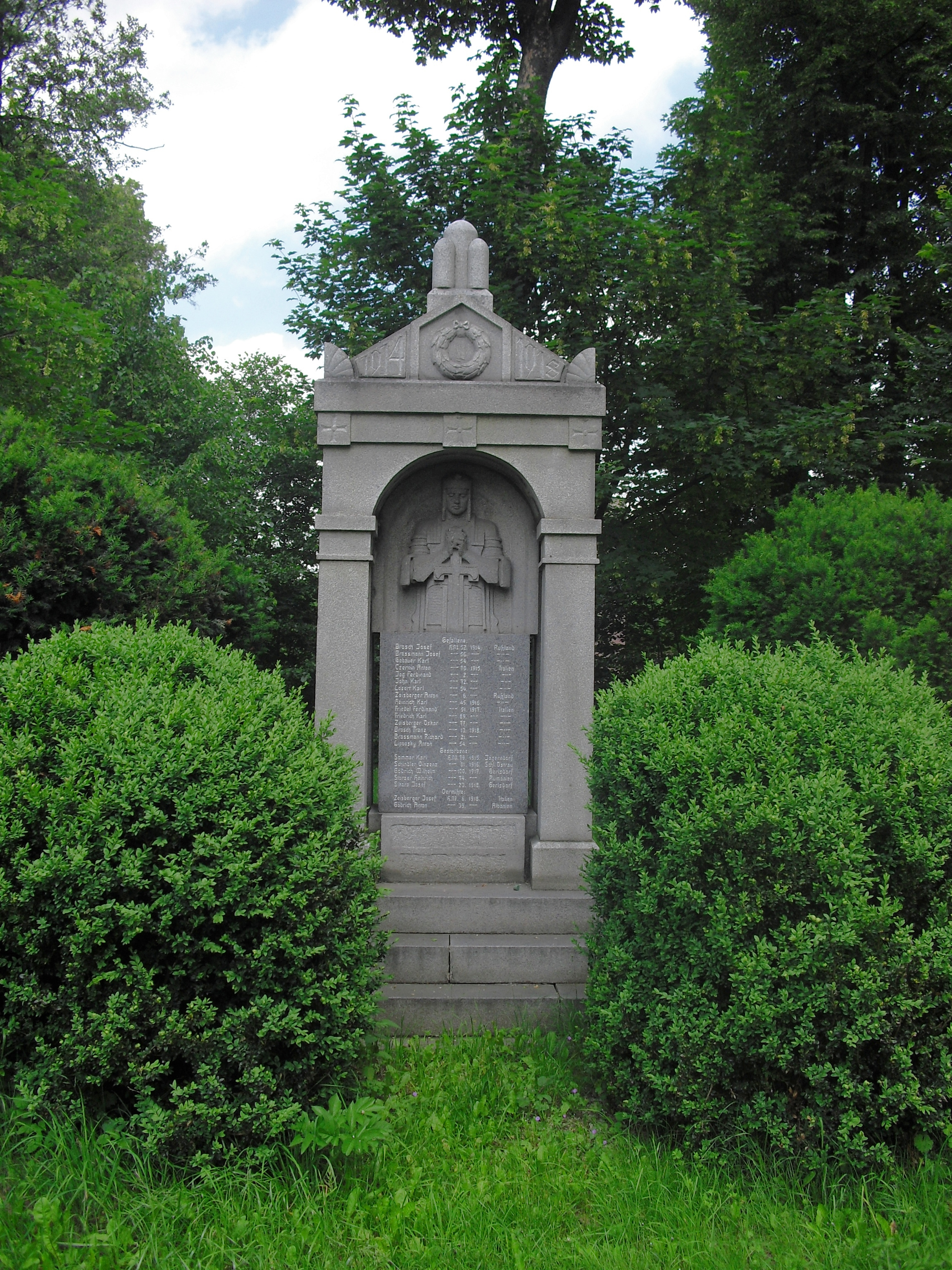
Monument to victims of the First World War located in Jerlochovice.

Jerlochovice (German: Gerlsdorf) is a cadastral area in Fulnek, Nový Jičín District, Czech Republic. It covers an area of approximately 8.76 km^{2} and mostly lies in Moravia although some parts are in Silesia. The population as of 2001 was 653.

== Notable people ==
- August von Gödrich, German cyclist
