= Allan Carlsson (cyclist) =

Swedish cyclist

Personal information
- Born: 17 April 1929 Norrköping, Sweden
- Died: 25 August 1953 (aged 24) Stockholm, Sweden

Cycling career
- Sport: Cycling

Allan Carlsson (17 April 1929 – 25 August 1953) was a Swedish cyclist. He competed in the individual and team road race events at the 1952 Summer Olympics.
