= Vladimir Kryuchkov (cyclist) =

Soviet cyclist (born 1929)

Personal information
- Born: 1929

Cycling career
- Sport: Cycling

Vladimir Kryuchkov (born 1929) is a Soviet cyclist. He competed in the individual and team road race events at the 1952 Summer Olympics.
