= Lajos Látó =

Hungarian cyclist

Personal information
- Born: 1932 (age 93–94)

Cycling career
- Sport: Cycling

Lajos Látó (born 1932) is a Hungarian cyclist. He competed in the individual and team road race events at the 1952 Summer Olympics.
