= Marin Niculescu =

Romanian cyclist

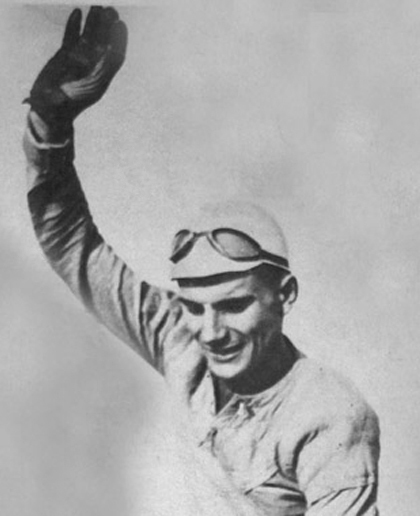

Personal information
- Born: 4 March 1923 Bucharest, Romania
- Died: 2 May 2014 (aged 91) Bucharest, Romania

Cycling career
- Sport: Cycling

Marin Niculescu (4 March 1923 – 2 May 2014) was a Romanian cyclist. He competed in the individual and team road race events at the 1952 Summer Olympics and placed 41st and 12th, respectively. Niculescu won the Tour of Romania in 1951 and two stages of the Tour de Pologne in 1949, placing second overall.
