= Thomas O'Rourke =

American cyclist (born 1934)

Personal information
- Born: December 24, 1934 (age 91) Detroit, Michigan, U.S.

Cycling career
- Sport: Cycling

Thomas Charles O'Rourke (born December 24, 1934) is an American cyclist. He competed in the individual and team road race events at the 1952 Summer Olympics.
