= Héctor Mellado =

Chilean cyclist

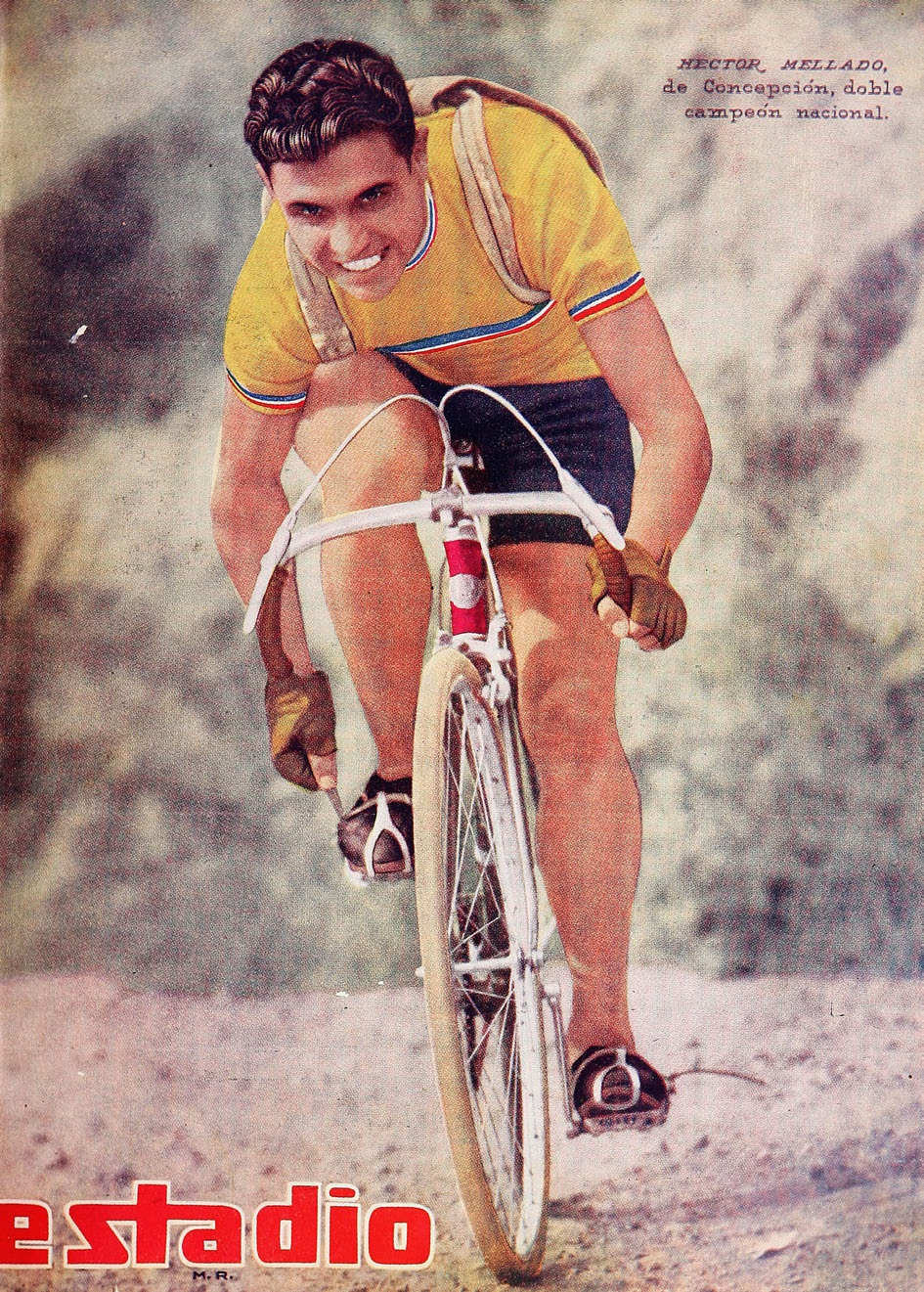

Personal information
- Born: 24 February 1925
- Died: 17 September 2007 (aged 82)

Cycling career
- Sport: Cycling

Héctor Mellado (24 February 1925 – 17 September 2007) was a Chilean cyclist. He competed in the individual and team road race events at the 1952 Summer Olympics.
