= Arthur Mannsbarth =

Austrian cyclist and speed skater (1930–1992)

Arthur Mannsbarth (28 April 1930 – 17 February 1992) was an Austrian road and track cyclist who competed in the 1952 Summer Olympics, and speed skater who competed in the 1952 Winter Olympics and in the 1956 Winter Olympics. He was born in Vienna.

In 1952 he finished eighth in the 5000 metres event, eleventh in the 10000 metres competition, 22nd in the 1500 metres contest, and 27th in the 500 metres event. Four years later he finished 28th in the 5000 meters competition, 29th in the 10000 meters contest, and 32nd in the 1500 meters event at the 1956 Games. At the 1952 Summer Olympics he competed in the road cycling race event but did not finish. As all three Austrian competitors did not finish the race, Austria was unplaced in the team road race contest. At the same Games he also finished 13th with the Austrian team in the team pursuit event.

Mannsbarth died on 17 February 1992, at the age of 61.
