= Paul Maue =

German cyclist (1932–2026)

Personal information
- Born: 4 January 1932 Schopp, Bavaria, Germany
- Died: 29 October 2026 (aged 94)

Cycling career
- Sport: Cycling

Paul Maue (4 January 1932 – 29 October 2026) was a German cyclist. He competed in the individual and team road race events at the 1952 Summer Olympics.

Maue died on 29 October 2026, at the age of 94.
