= Hugo Machado (cyclist) =

Uruguayan cyclist

Personal information
- Born: 3 July 1923 Rocha, Uruguay
- Died: 8 July 2015 (aged 92) Montevideo, Uruguay

Cycling career
- Sport: Cycling

Hugo Machado (3 July 1923 – 8 July 2015) was a Uruguayan cyclist. He competed in the individual and team road race events at the 1952 Summer Olympics. Machado was born in Rocha on 3 July 1923. He died in Montevideo on 8 July 2015, at the age of 92.
