= André Moes =

Luxembourgish cyclist (1930–2019)

Personal information
- Born: 2 March 1930
- Died: 13 November 2019 (aged 89)

Cycling career
- Sport: Cycling

André Moes (2 March 1930 – 13 November 2019) was a Luxembourgish cyclist. He competed in the individual and team road race events at the 1952 Summer Olympics.
