= Arend van 't Hoft =

Dutch cyclist

Personal information
- Born: 31 August 1933 Hoofddorp, Netherlands
- Died: 17 August 2014 (aged 80)

Cycling career
- Sport: Cycling

Arend van 't Hoft (31 August 1933 – 17 August 2014) was a Dutch racing cyclist. He competed in the individual and team road race events at the 1952 Summer Olympics.

== See also ==
- List of Dutch Olympic cyclists
