= Karel Nesl =

Czech cyclist

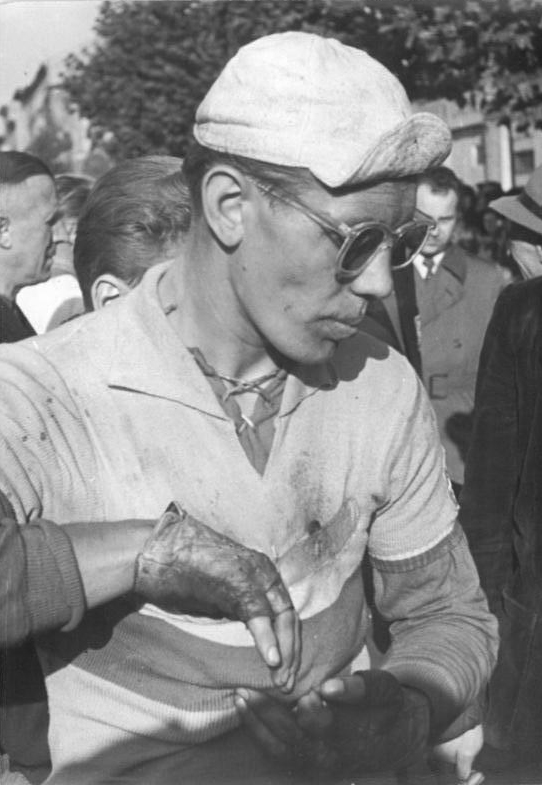
- Nesl in 1951

Personal information
- Born: 26 December 1930
- Died: 2009 (aged 78–79)

Cycling career
- Sport: Cycling

Karel Nesl (26 December 1930 – 2009) was a Czech cyclist. He competed in the individual and team road race events at the 1952 Summer Olympics.
