= Roger Ludwig =

Luxembourgish cyclist

Personal information
- Born: 16 January 1933
- Died: 11 April 2009 (aged 76)

Cycling career
- Sport: Cycling
Medal record
Men's road bicycle racing
Representing Luxembourg
World Championships
Bronze medal – third place	1952 Luxembourg	Amateur's Road Race

Roger Ludwig (16 January 1933 – 11 April 2009) was a Luxembourgish cyclist. He competed in the individual and team road race events at the 1952 Summer Olympics.
