= Victor Georgescu =

Romanian cyclist

Personal information
- Born: 21 November 1932 (age 93)

Cycling career
- Sport: Cycling

Victor Georgescu (born 21 November 1932) is a Romanian cyclist. He competed in the individual and team road race events at the 1952 Summer Olympics.
