= Anatoly Kolesov (cyclist) =

Soviet cyclist (born 1931)

Personal information
- Born: 1931

Cycling career
- Sport: Cycling

Anatoly Ivanovich Kolesov (Russian: Анатолий Иванович Колесов; born 1931) is a Soviet cyclist. He competed in the individual and team road race events at the 1952 Summer Olympics.
