= Julio Cepeda =

Mexican cyclist

Personal information
- Born: 20 December 1932 (age 93) Monterrey, Mexico

Cycling career
- Sport: Cycling

Julio Cepeda (born 20 December 1932) is a Mexican cyclist. He competed in the individual and team road race events at the 1952 Summer Olympics.
