= Doris Lockness =

American aviator

Doris Estella (Rhoads) Lockness (February 2, 1910 – January 30, 2017) was a pioneering American aviator. Two of her sons, Dave Rhodes and Ron Rhoads, were Olympic cyclists.

== Biography ==
Lockness was born in Pennsylvania in 1910 and began flying in 1939 and worked as a liaison engineer at Douglas Aircraft Company.

She left in 1943 to join the Women Airforce Service Pilots, she was one of 25,000 women who applied to be Air Force Service pilots and was one of 1,074 accepted. She enlisted in the war effort after her husband at the time received a deferment, because of the couple's four children. After the war she continued in aviation, working as a flight instructor and performing at air shows. She held multiple flight ratings and certifications, including CFI, sea planes, gliders, balloon and helicopter ratings. Lockness received her helicopter rating on April 20, 1963. She was the 55th woman to receive a helicopter rating, and became the 55th member of the Whirly Girls, an organization for women in helicopter aviation. In 1998, she earned her commercial gyroplane license. She was the second woman to hold a rating for a constant speed prop gyroplane.

A regular airshow performer, she was often flying “Swamp Angel”, her Vultee Stinson L-5 with 190 horsepower engine that served in New Guinea in World War II. She bought "Swamp-Angel" as war surplus and kept the plane until she was 90. Her adventures were not limited to the skies. Doris was also an avid Jaguar enthusiast and a member of the Sacramento Jaguar Club.

At age 87, she was the 100th pilot to fly into the Amelia Earhart Memorial Airport in Atchison, Kansas. She flew her last plane at age 89. At her 100th birthday party, she co-piloted a Robinson 44 helicopter for her assembled guests.

In 1994, she was nominated for the NAA's Elder Statesman of Aviation Award. In her nomination, Lockness was cited as "the only pilot in the world qualified for membership in all of four exclusive aviation organizations, OX5 Aviation Pioneers; Women's Airforce Service Pilots WWII (WASP); International Women Helicopter Pilots, Inc. (Whirly-Girls); and the United Flying Octogenarians (UFO)."

In 1997, a biography of Lockness was included in a “Women and Flight” exhibition at the National Air and Space Museum.

Lockness died 3 days before her 107th birthday in 2017 in Folsom, California.

== Awards ==
- 1995 - National Aeronautics Association Elder Statesman of Aviation Award
- 1996 - Whirly Girls Livingston Award
- 1997 - NAA's Katharine Wright Memorial Trophy
- 2002 - Women in Aviation International Pioneer Hall of Fame
- 2010 - California National Guard Honorable Order of St. Michael
- 2010 - WASP Gold Medal

== Related ==
- Women Airforce Service Pilots
- Ninety-Nines
- Whirly Girls
- “Hovering” by Henry M. Holden,
- “Ladybirds II: The Continuing Story of American Women in Aviation”
- “Women and Flight” by Carolyn Russo.
