= Ronald Rhoads =

American cyclist

Personal information
- Born: September 7, 1933 (age 93) Long Beach, California, U.S.

Cycling career
- Sport: Cycling

Ronald Duane Rhoads (born September 7, 1933) is an American cyclist. He competed in the individual and team road race events at the 1952 Summer Olympics.

He won the 1953 United States Cycling National Championships.

He was joined on the Olympic team by his brother David Rhoads. They were the first brothers to make the Olympic cycling team. He was the son of aviator Doris Lockness.
