= Virgilio Pereyra =

Uruguayan cyclist (1928–2013)

Virgilio Pereyra Ferrer
Personal information
- Born: 30 May 1928 La Paz, Uruguay
- Died: 2013

Cycling career
- Sport: Cycling

Virgilio Pereyra (30 May 1928 – 2013) was a Uruguayan cyclist. He competed in the individual and team road race events at the 1952 Summer Olympics.
