= Ricardo García (cyclist, born 1926) =

Mexican cyclist

Personal information
- Born: 3 April 1926
- Died: 10 March 2008 (aged 81)

Cycling career
- Sport: Cycling

Ricardo García (3 April 1926 – 10 March 2008) was a Mexican cyclist. He competed in the individual and team road race events at the 1952 Summer Olympics.
