= Desmond Robinson =

British cyclist

Personal information
- Born: 30 December 1927 Ravensthorpe, Dewsbury, West Riding of Yorkshire, England
- Died: 10 December 2015 (aged 87) Mirfield, Kirklees, West Yorkshire, England

Cycling career
- Sport: Cycling
- Discipline: Road
- Role: Rider

Desmond Robinson (30 December 1927 – 10 December 2015) was a British cyclist. He competed in the individual and team road race events at the 1952 Summer Olympics. He was the brother of fellow racing cyclist Brian Robinson.

Robinson started racing seriously in 1945, when he joined Huddersfield Road Club. As well as competing at the Olympics, his career highlights included winning the Manx International in 1949 and the amateur version of the Tour of Britain in 1955. He retired from competition at the end of 1955.

Outside of cycling, Robinson earned a Higher National Certificate in Mechanical and Electrical Engineering, and worked for his father's joinery firm, HF Robinson and Sons, later joining Imperial Chemical Industries in Redcar. He subsequently lectured in engineering at Wakefield College and Barnsley College.

Robinson married Beryl in 1953, and the couple had three daughters, Linda, Denise and Jane. He died in December 2015, after suffering a stroke in May of that year.
