= Les Ingman =

British cyclist (1927–1990)

Personal information
- Born: 17 August 1927 Barrow-in-Furness, Cumbria, England
- Died: 29 October 1999 (aged 72) Hounslow, London, England

Cycling career
- Sport: Cycling

William Leslie "Les" Ingman (17 August 1927 – 29 October 1990) was a British cyclist who competed in the 1952 Summer Olympics. He was born in Barrow-in-Furness, and died in Hounslow. He represented the Apollo Cycling Club. Participating in the road race of cycling at the 1952 Summer Olympics, he failed to finish the race, and thus became a non-scoring member of the British team. He won the British National Hill Climb Championships in 1954 and 1956.
