= Nikolay Bobarenko =

Soviet cyclist

Personal information
- Born: 27 November 1930
- Died: 16 April 1996 (aged 65)

Cycling career
- Sport: Cycling

Nikolay Bobarenko (27 November 1930 – 16 April 1996) was a Soviet cyclist. He competed in the individual and team road race events at the 1952 Summer Olympics.
