= Lưu Quần =

Vietnamese cyclist

Personal information
- Born: 19 June 1925

Cycling career
- Sport: Cycling
- Discipline: Road cycling
- Role: Rider

Lưu Quần (born 19 June 1925) is a Vietnamese former cyclist. He competed in the individual and team road race events at the 1952 Summer Olympics.

== Career ==
Along with seven other athletes, he represented Vietnam at the 1952 Summer Olympics in Helsinki, Finland. This was also the first time Vietnam participated in the Olympic Games. There, he competed in the men's individual road race and finished with a time of 5:24:34, placing 47th out of 154 competitors.
