= Josef Schraner =

Swiss cyclist

Personal information
- Born: 5 April 1929 Mellikon, Switzerland

Cycling career
- Sport: Cycling

Josef Schraner (born 5 April 1929) is a former Swiss cyclist. He competed in the individual and team road race events at the 1952 Summer Olympics.
