= Yngve Lundh =

Swedish cyclist

Personal information
- Born: 5 April 1924 Bollnäs, Sweden
- Died: 10 March 2017 (aged 92)

Cycling career
- Sport: Cycling

Yngve Lundh (5 April 1924 – 10 March 2017) was a Swedish cyclist. He competed in the individual and team road race events at the 1952 Summer Olympics.
