= Stanislav Svoboda (cyclist) =

Czech cyclist

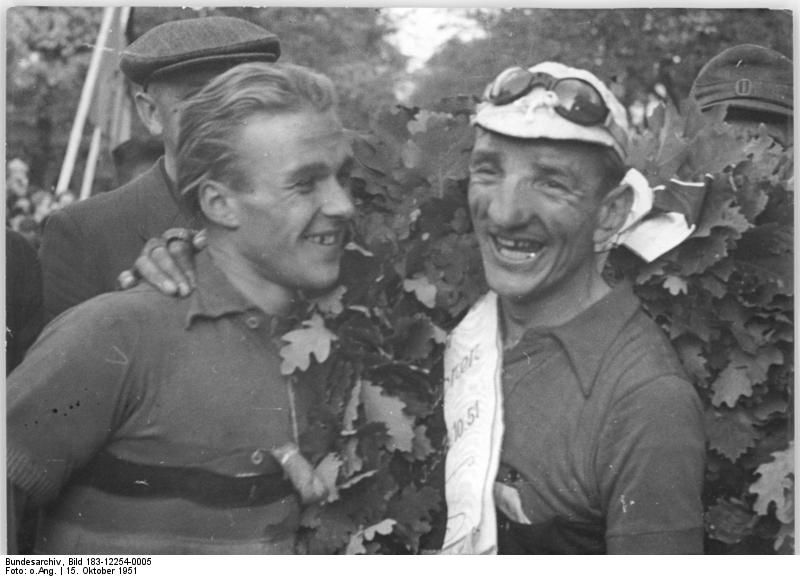
- Peace Race, Svoboda Illus DS 15.10.51 "Peace Race of Nations" through the GDR from October 3–14, 1951.

Personal information
- Born: 9 October 1930
- Died: 4 May 1967 (aged 36)

Cycling career
- Sport: Cycling

Stanislav Svoboda (9 October 1930 – 4 May 1967) was a Czech cyclist. He competed in the individual and team road race events at the 1952 Summer Olympics.
