= Helge Hansen (cyclist) =

Danish cyclist

Personal information
- Full name: Helge Hansen
- Born: 24 February 1925 Kongens Lyngby, Denmark
- Died: 22 January 2008 (aged 82)

Cycling career
- Sport: Cycling
- Discipline: Road
- Role: Rider

Helge Hansen (24 February 1925 – 22 January 2008) was a Danish cyclist. He competed in the individual and team road race events at the 1952 Summer Olympics.
