= Lucien Fliffel =

French cyclist

Personal information
- Full name: Lucien Louis Flifel Ben Mebarek
- Born: 12 November 1931 (age 94) Marseille

Cycling career
- Sport: Cycling
- Role: Rider

Lucien Fliffel (born 12 November 1931) is a French racing cyclist. He rode in the 1956 Tour de France. His father Embareck Fliffel "Flifel Ben Otsmane El Hammani Ben Mebarek" (1901-1992) was also a professional cyclist.
