= Nicolas Morn =

Luxembourgish cyclist

Personal information
- Born: 23 February 1932 Hautbellain, Luxembourg
- Died: 14 March 1997 (aged 65) Hautbellain, Luxembourg

Cycling career
- Sport: Cycling

Nicolas Morn (23 February 1932 – 14 March 1997) was a Luxembourgish cyclist. He competed in the individual and team road race events at the 1952 Summer Olympics.
