= Walter Becker (cyclist) =

German cyclist (1932–2012)

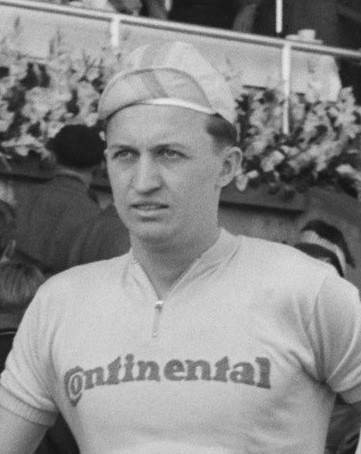
- Becker in 1956

Personal information
- Born: 18 October 1932 Kaiserslautern, Germany
- Died: 7 June 2012 (aged 79)

Cycling career
- Sport: Cycling

Walter Becker (18 October 1932 – 7 June 2012) was a German cyclist. He competed in the individual and team road race events at the 1952 Summer Olympics.
