= Milan Perič (artist) =

Czech painter, bass player and musician

- Milan Peric, exhibition in Louny
- Born: Milan Perič; 24 July 1957 (age 68); Prague, Czechoslovakia
- Education: Jiri Karmazin (professor), Academy of Arts, Prague
- Known for: Painting, drawing, sculpture, printmaking, music
- Notable work: Happy People (2007); Konfrontace (1986); Black Madona (2007)
- Movement: Expressionism, Dekadence
- Patrons: Gallery XXL Louny

Milan Peric (born 24 July 1957) is a Czech expressionist painter, bass player and avant-garde musician, lecturer of art in Academy of Fine Arts in Prague and member of Czechoslovak underground culture of the 1980s.

== Biography ==
- 1986‑1987 Academy of Fine Arts in Prague, landscape paintings prof. Jiří Karmazín
- 1990‑1993 Academy of Fine Arts in Prague, intermedia studio (prof. Milan Knížák)
- Since 1995 working as a teaching assistant in intermedia studio in Academy of Fine Arts in Prague

== His works ==
Peric exhibited in Denmark, the Netherlands, Austria, Germany and USA. During the 10 and 12 October in the year 1986 was managed group exhibition Confrontation V. by Czechoslovak "underground" that's mean "non-official action" at the Milan Peric's farm "Svarov" close Kladno.

== Artist portraits ==
A portfolio of all his black and white portraits was prepared by Miroslav Pesch and a limited number of these portraits were prepared by as large-format prints. The final edition, based on Peric's specifications, will be realized under the title Happy people.

=== Solo exhibition ===
- 2007 Happy people, Galerie XXL Louny*2005–2006 Petr Písařík, Milan Peric, The National Gallery in Prague

=== Group exhibitions ===
- 1986 Konfrontace V. Svárov, Kladno, Czechoslovakia*1987 Konfrontace VI. Prague
- Konfrontace VII. in Svárov village close Kladno
- 1989 Konfrontace VIII. Svárov
- Dům u kamenného zvonu, Prague
- 1990 Gallery of Špála (Špálova galerie) Prague
- Vodní tvrz Praha /skupina Svárov /
- De Fabriek Eindhoven – Netherlands
- Open Haven Muzeum Amsterdam – Netherlands
- 1991 / La peniche Opera Prague
- 1992 Karolinum Praha /skupina Svárov/
- The National Gallery of Art in Bratislava, Slovakia
- 1993 Konfrontace IX. Svárov
- Karolinum in Prague, Czech Republic
- IAA Frankfurt am Main – Germany
- 1994 Kunstpalast Düsseldorf
- "Netz Europe" Linz, Austria

== Collections ==
- National Gallery Prague
- The Czech Museum of Fine Arts in Prague
- Private collection in Czech Republic, Germany, Canada, Switzerland and Sweden.

== External links and materials ==
- about happening in Svarov 1986
- Petr Písařík – Milan Perič exhibition in The National Gallery in Prague
- Academy of Fine Arts in Prague
- Undergroundculture
- Milan Peric and Grand Sculpturefestival in Prague
- Videoreports with Milan Perič on Artycok.TV

== Literature for study ==
- Milan Peric Biography
- catalogue Milan Peric
- Czechoslovak underground literature: Někdo něco no.5 and no.6

== Articles ==
- Svarov action 1986
