= Piet van den Brekel =

Dutch cyclist (1932–1999)

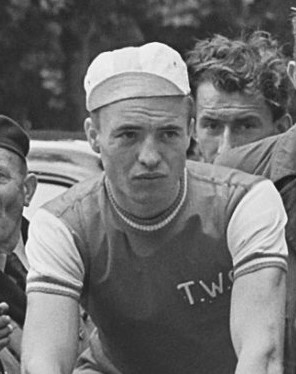

Personal information
- Born: 21 July 1932 Echt, Limburg, Netherlands
- Died: 18 July 1999 (aged 66) Almelo, Netherlands

Cycling career
- Sport: Cycling
- Role: Rider

Piet van den Brekel (21 July 1932 – 18 July 1999) was a Dutch professional racing cyclist. He rode in the 1956 Tour de France.
