= Fausto Lurati =

Swiss cyclist

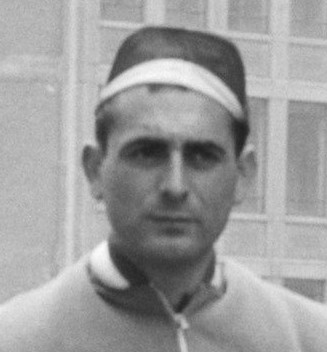
- Fausto Lurati (1955)

Personal information
- Born: 29 August 1929 Breganzona, Switzerland
- Died: 28 July 2015 (aged 85)

Cycling career
- Sport: Cycling

Fausto Lurati (29 August 1929 – 28 July 2015) was a Swiss cyclist. He competed in the individual and team road race events at the 1952 Summer Olympics.
