= Milan Perič (cyclist) =

Czech cyclist

Personal information
- Born: 12 March 1928 Prague, Czechoslovakia
- Died: 4 May 1967 (aged 39)

Cycling career
- Sport: Cycling

Milan Perič (12 March 1928 – 4 May 1967) was a Czech cyclist. He competed in the individual and team road race events at the 1952 Summer Olympics.
