= Châu Phước Vĩnh =

Vietnamese cyclist

Personal information
- Born: 8 May 1927

Cycling career
- Sport: Cycling

Châu Phước Vĩnh (born 8 May 1927) is a Vietnamese cyclist. He competed in the individual and team road race events at the 1952 Summer Olympics.
