= Petre Nuță =

Romanian cyclist

Personal information
- Born: 2 July 1928

Cycling career
- Sport: Cycling

Petre Nuță (born 2 July 1928, date of death unknown) was a Romanian cyclist. He competed in the individual and team road race events at the 1952 Summer Olympics.
