= Eugène Letendre =

French cyclist

Personal information
- Born: 10 August 1931 Louvigné-du-Désert, France
- Died: 24 April 2014 (aged 82)

Cycling career
- Sport: Cycling
- Role: Rider

Eugène Letendre (10 August 1931 – 24 April 2014) was a French professional racing cyclist. He rode two editions of the Tour de France.
