= Lê Văn Phước =

Vietnamese cyclist

Personal information
- Born: 15 October 1929

Cycling career
- Sport: Cycling
- Disciplines: Road; Track
- Role: Rider

Lê Văn Phước (born 15 October 1929) is a former Vietnamese road and track cyclist being active during the 1950s and 1960s.

He competed at the 1952 and 1956 Summer Olympics.

== Career ==
In 1952 it was the debut for Vietnam at the Olympics that in Helsinki, where he was one of the eight athletes and one of the four cyclists. He participated in the individual road race event and team road race event. At the next Games in 1956 in Melbourne he competed in another cycling sport, track cycling, and competed in the sprint event.

He represented Vietnam also at other international competitions, including the 1961 SEAP Games in Rangoon, Burma where South Vietnam only sent cyclists despite the need for the republic to cut expenses.
