= Roland Bezamat =

French cyclist

Personal information
- Born: 26 May 1924 Paris, France
- Died: 15 May 2022 (aged 97)

Cycling career
- Sport: Cycling
Medal record
Men's cycling
Representing France
Olympic Games
Bronze medal – third place	1952 Helsinki	Team road race

Roland Bezamat (26 May 1924 – 15 May 2022) was a French cyclist. He competed in the individual and team road race events at the 1952 Summer Olympics, winning a bronze medal in the latter. 1980s fashion and beauty model Anne Bezamat is his daughter.
