= August von Gödrich =

German cyclist

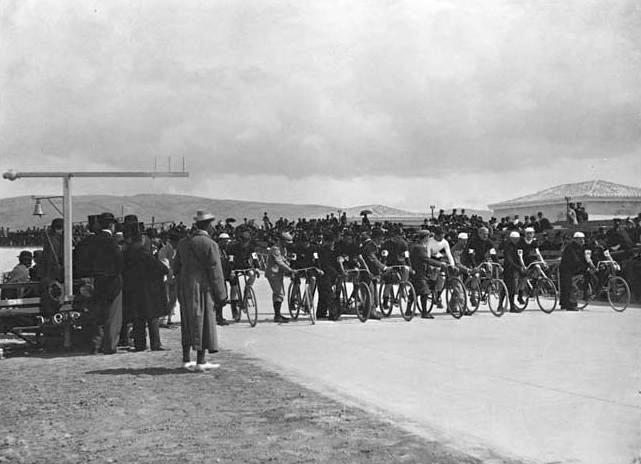
- August von Gödrich During a Competition

Personal information
- Born: 25 September 1859 Jerlochovice, Fulnek, Austrian Empire
- Died: 16 March 1942 (aged 82) Fulnek, Nazi Germany

Cycling career
- Sport: Cycling
Medal record
Men's road bicycle racing
Representing Germany
Olympic Games
| Silver medal – second place | 1896 Athens | Road race |

August von Gödrich (25 September 1859 – 16 March 1942) was a racing cyclist from Austria-Hungary. He competed at the 1896 Summer Olympics in Athens.

Gödrich competed in the road race. He placed second in the 87 kilometre race from Athens to Marathon and back, finishing in 3:42:18 behind Aristidis Konstantinidis of Greece.
