= Werner Arnold (cyclist) =

Swiss cyclist

Personal information
- Born: 14 June 1930 Basel, Switzerland
- Died: 1 February 2005 (aged 74) Basel, Switzerland

Cycling career
- Sport: Cycling
- Role: Rider

Werner Arnold (14 June 1930 – 1 February 2005) was a Swiss professional racing cyclist. He rode in the 1956 Tour de France.
