= Erling Kristiansen =

Erling Kristiansen may refer to:

- Erling Kristiansen (chess player) (1936–2022), Norwegian chess player
- Erling Kristiansen (cyclist) (1923–2009), Norwegian cyclist
