= Arthur Bihannic =

French cyclist (1933–2022)

Personal information
- Born: 7 August 1933 Brest, France
- Died: 23 December 2022 (aged 89) Brest, France

Cycling career
- Sport: Cycling
- Role: Rider

Arthur Bihannic (7 August 1933 – 23 December 2022) was a French professional racing cyclist. He rode the 1956 Tour de France. Bihannic died in Brest on 23 December 2022, at the age of 89.
