= Edmond Jacobs =

Luxembourgish cyclist

Personal information
- Born: 14 October 1928 Garnich, Luxembourg
- Died: 26 March 2012 (aged 83)

Cycling career
- Sport: Cycling
- Role: Rider

Edmond Jacobs (14 October 1928 – 26 March 2012) was a Luxembourgish professional racing cyclist. He rode in the 1956 Tour de France.
