= Kim Hae-nam =

South Korean weightlifter (1929–2017)

Personal information
- Nationality: South Korean
- Born: 23 May 1929; Pyeonganbuk, Korea
- Died: 29 July 2017; Germantown, Maryland, USA

Sport
- Sport: Weightlifting

Kim Hae-nam (23 May 1929 – 29 July 2017) was a South Korean former weightlifter. He competed at the 1952, 1956, 1960 and the 1964 Summer Olympics.

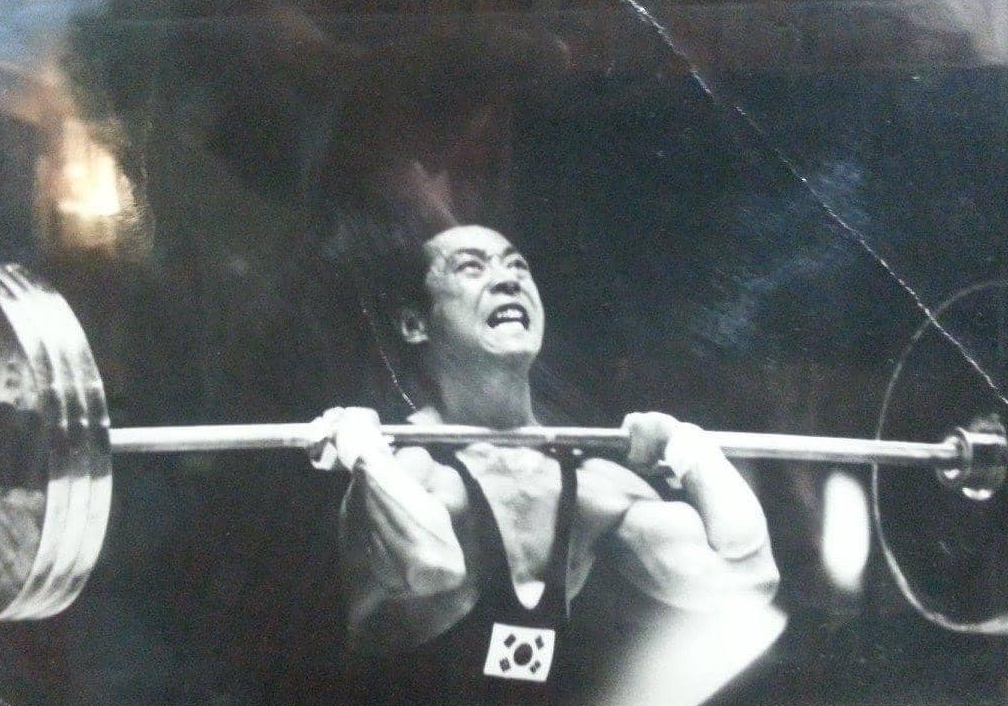
