= Edi Ziegler =

German cyclist (1930–2020)

Personal information
- Full name: Edwin Ziegler
- Born: 25 February 1930 Schweinfurt, Bavaria, Weimar Republic
- Died: 19 March 2020 (aged 90) Munich, Germany

Cycling career
- Sport: Cycling
Medal record
Men's cycling
Representing Germany
Olympic Games
Bronze medal – third place	1952 Helsinki	Individual Road Race

Edwin Ziegler (25 February 1930 – 19 March 2020) was a German road racing cyclist. He won the bronze medal in the men's individual road race at the 1952 Summer Olympics in Helsinki, Finland, behind two Belgians: André Noyelle (gold) and Robert Grondelaers (silver). He was a professional rider from 1957 to 1959.
