= Jean-Claude Skerl =

French cyclist

Personal information
- Born: 16 August 1931 Paris, France
- Died: 24 January 2002 (aged 70) Paris, France

Cycling career
- Sport: Cycling
- Role: Rider

Jean-Claude Skerl (16 August 1931 – 24 January 2002) was a French professional racing cyclist. He rode in the 1956 Tour de France.
