= Petar Georgiev (cyclist) =

Bulgarian cyclist

Personal information
- Full name: Petar Dimitrov Georgiev
- Born: 21 July 1929

Cycling career
- Sport: Cycling

Petar Georgiev (Bulgarian: Петър Георгиев, born 21 July 1929) is a Bulgarian cyclist. He competed in the individual and team road race events at the 1952 Summer Olympics.
