= Tamotsu Chikanari =

Japanese cyclist (born 1929)

Personal information
- Born: 30 March 1929

Cycling career
- Sport: Cycling

Tamotsu Chikanari (近成 保, Chikanari Tamotsu; born 30 March 1929) is a Japanese cyclist. He competed in four events at the 1952 Summer Olympics.
