= Tadashi Kato =

Japanese cyclist (1935–2020)

Personal information
- Born: 4 January 1935
- Died: 17 March 2020 (aged 85)

Cycling career
- Sport: Cycling

Tadashi Kato (加藤 忠, Katō Tadashi; 4 January 1935 – 17 March 2020) was a Japanese cyclist. He competed in four events at the 1952 Summer Olympics.
