= Gianni Ghidini =

Italian cyclist (1930–1995)

Personal information
- Full name: Gianni Ghidini
- Born: 21 May 1930 Golese, Italy
- Died: 21 June 1995 (aged 65) Baganzola, Italy

Cycling career
- Sport: Cycling
- Discipline: Road
- Role: Rider

Professional teams
- 1953: Atala
- 1953: Lygie
- 1954–1955: Girardengo-Eldorado
Medal record
Men's road bicycle racing
Representing Italy
Olympic Games
Silver medal – second place	1952 Helsinki	Team Road Race
World Championships
Gold medal – first place	1951 Varese	Amateur's Road Race

Gianni Ghidini (21 May 1930 – 21 June 1995) was a road racing cyclist from Italy. He won the silver medal in the men's team road race, alongside Dino Bruni and Vincenzo Zucconelli. Italy's fourth rider Bruno Monti also crossed the line, but didn't receive a medal because just the first three counted for the final classification. He was a professional rider from 1953 to 1956.
