= Suprovat Chakravarty =

Indian cyclist

Personal information
- Nickname: Khaja
- Born: 28 November 1931
- Died: 24 December 2015 (aged 84) Kolkata, West Bengal, India

Cycling career
- Sport: Cycling

Suprovat Chakravarty (28 November 1931 – 24 December 2015) was an Indian cyclist. He competed in four events at the 1952 Summer Olympics.
