= Robert Grondelaers =

Belgian cyclist

Personal information
- Born: 28 February 1933 Opglabbeek, Belgium
- Died: 22 August 1989 (aged 56) Opglabbeek, Belgium

Cycling career
- Sport: Cycling
Medal record
Representing Belgium
Men's cycling
Olympic Games
Gold medal – first place	1952 Helsinki	Team Road Race
Silver medal – second place	1952 Helsinki	Individual Road Race

Robert Grondelaers (28 February 1933 – 22 August 1989) was a road cyclist from Belgium. He won the silver medal in the men's individual road race at the 1952 Summer Olympics in Helsinki, Finland. At the same tournament he claimed the title in the men's team road race, alongside André Noyelle and Lucien Victor. He was a professional rider from 1954 to 1962.
