= István Lang =

Hungarian cyclist (1933–2007)

Personal information
- Born: 14 January 1933 Baja, Hungary
- Died: 8 September 2007 (aged 74) Budapest, Hungary

Cycling career
- Sport: Cycling

István Lang (14 January 1933 – 8 September 2007) was a Hungarian cyclist. He competed in four events at the 1952 Summer Olympics. Lang died in Budapest on 8 September 2007, at the age of 74.
