= David Rhoads =

American cyclist

Personal information
- Full name: David Stewart Rhoads
- Born: May 27, 1932 Long Beach, California, United States
- Died: February 21, 2017 (aged 84)

Cycling career
- Sport: Cycling

David Stewart Rhoads (May 27, 1932 – February 21, 2017) was an American cyclist. He competed at the 1952 and 1956 Summer Olympics. His brother Ronald Rhoads was on the Olympic cycling team alongside him.

He was the son of the aviator Doris Lockness.
