= Jules Maenen =

Dutch cyclist (1932–2007)

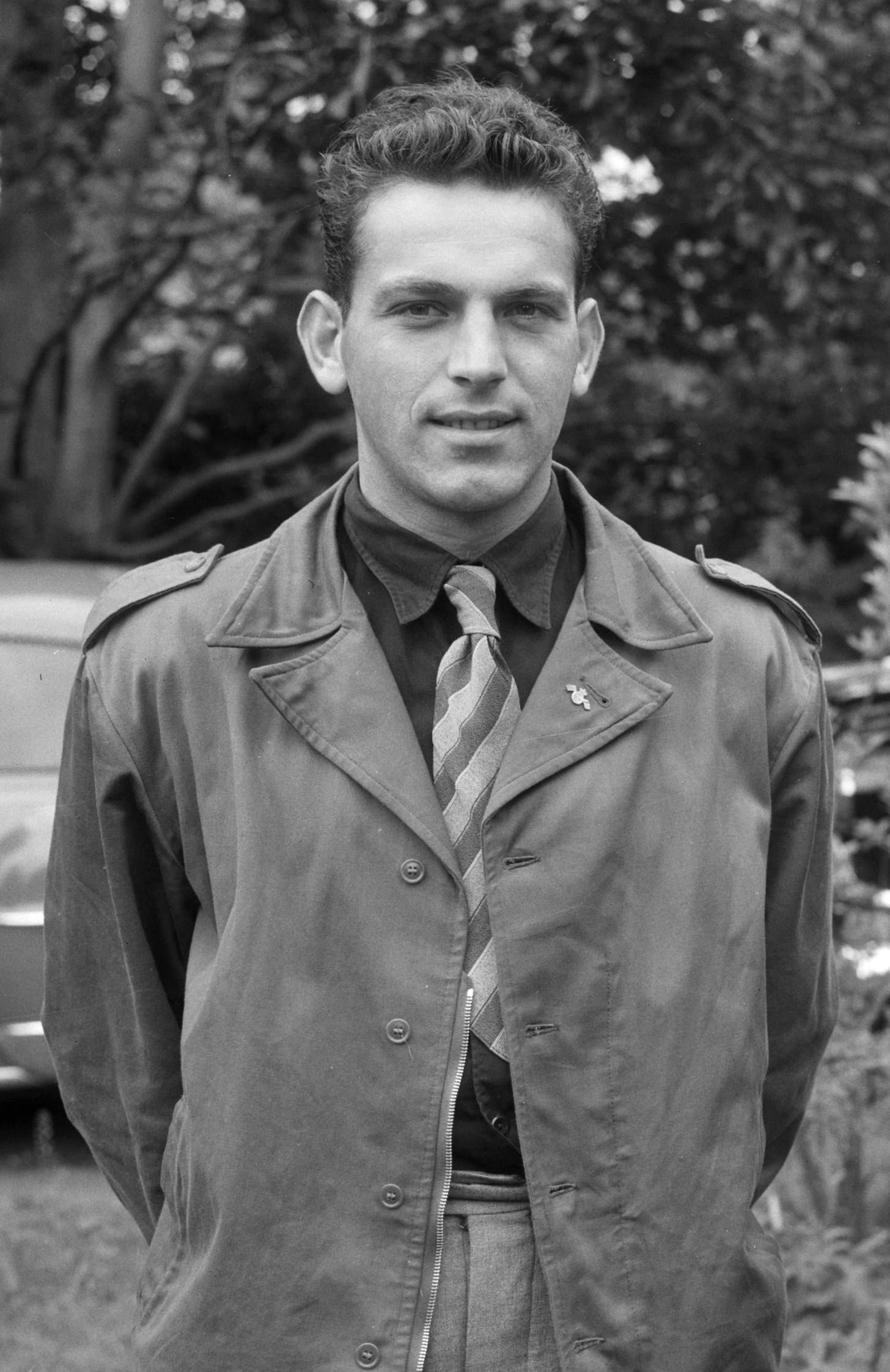
- Jules Maenen in 1954

Personal information
- Full name: Jules Maenen
- Born: 15 January 1932 Valkenswaard, the Netherlands
- Died: 11 February 2007 (aged 75)

Cycling career
- Sport: Cycling

Julius Hermanus Maenen (15 January 1932 – 11 February 2007) was a road and track cyclist from the Netherlands, who represented his native country at the 1952 Summer Olympics in Helsinki, Finland. There he was eliminated in the quarterfinals of the 4,000 m team pursuit, alongside Adrie Voorting, Daan de Groot and Jan Plantaz. Maenen did not finish his individual road race. After the Olympics he turned professional and finished second at the Dutch National Road Championship in 1957 behind Wim van Est.

== See also ==
- List of Dutch Olympic cyclists
