= István Schillerwein =

Hungarian cyclist

Personal information
- Born: 13 December 1933 Budapest, Hungary
- Died: 19 May 2009 (aged 75)

Cycling career
- Sport: Cycling

István Schillerwein (13 December 1933 – 19 May 2009) was a Hungarian cyclist. He competed in four events at the 1952 Summer Olympics.
