= Vincenzo Zucconelli =

Italian cyclist (born 1931)

Personal information
- Full name: Vincenzo Zucconelli
- Born: 3 June 1931 (age 95) Jolanda di Savoia, Italy

Cycling career
- Sport: Cycling
- Discipline: Road
- Role: Rider
Medal record
Representing Italy
Men's road bicycle racing
Olympic Games
Silver medal – second place	1952 Helsinki	Team Road Race

Vincenzo Zucconelli (Italian pronunciation: [vinˈtʃɛntso ddzukkoˈnɛlli], born 3 June 1931) was a road racing cyclist from Italy who won the silver medal in the men's team road race, alongside Dino Bruni and Gianni Ghidini. Italy's fourth rider Bruno Monti also crossed the line, but did not receive a medal because just the first three counted for the final classification. He was a professional rider from 1954 to 1959.
