= Ilya Velchev =

Bulgarian cyclist (1925–2006)

Personal information
- Born: 25 February 1925
- Died: 2006 (aged 80–81)

Cycling career
- Sport: Cycling

Ilya Velchev (Bulgarian: Илия Велчев, 25 February 1925 – 2006) was a Bulgarian cyclist. He competed in three events at the 1952 Summer Olympics. Velchev died in 2006.
