= Milcho Rusev =

Bulgarian cyclist

Milcho Dimov Rusev
Personal information
- Born: 1924 Sliven, Bulgaria
- Died: 6 August 2006 (aged 81–82)

Cycling career
- Sport: Cycling

Milcho Dimov Rusev (Bulgarian: Милчо Русев, 1924 – 6 August 2006) was a Bulgarian cyclist. He competed in three events at the 1952 Summer Olympics.
