= Lucien Victor =

Belgian cyclist

Personal information
- Born: 28 June 1931 Oekene, Belgium
- Died: 17 September 1995 (aged 64) Sedan, France

Cycling career
- Sport: Cycling
Medal record
Representing Belgium
Men's cycling
Olympic Games
Gold medal – first place	1952 Helsinki	Team Road Race

Lucien Victor (28 June 1931 – 17 September 1995) was a road racing cyclist from Belgium. He won the gold medal in the men's team road race, alongside André Noyelle and Robert Grondelaers at the 1952 Summer Olympics. He was a professional rider from 1953 to 1956.
