= Dino Bruni =

Italian cyclist (1932–2026)

Personal information
- Born: 13 April 1932 Portomaggiore, Italy
- Died: 8 July 2026 (aged 94) Portomaggiore

Cycling career
- Sport: Cycling
- Discipline: Road
- Role: Rider

Major wins
- Silver medal 1952 Summer Olympics; 3 stages Tour de France, 2 stages Giro d'Italia
Medal record
Men's road bicycle racing
Representing Italy
Olympic Games
Silver medal – second place	1952 Helsinki	Team Road Race
World Championships
Bronze medal – third place	1955 Frascati	Amateur's Road Race

Dino Bruni (13 April 1932 – 8 July 2026) was an Italian road racing cyclist who won the silver medal in the men's team road race at the 1952 Summer Olympics, alongside Vincenzo Zucconelli and Gianni Ghidini. Italy's fourth rider Bruno Monti also crossed the line, but did not receive a medal because just the first three counted for the final classification. Bruni also represented his native country at the 1956 Summer Olympics in Melbourne, Australia. After his amateur career, he was a professional rider from 1956 to 1965. He won three stages in the Tour de France, and two stages in the Giro d'Italia. Bruni died on 8 July 2026, at the age of 94.

== Major results ==
1957
Vezzola
1958
Capri
1959
Tre Valli Varesine
Trofeo Fenaroli
Tour de France:

Winner stages 4 and 16

1960
Rovigo
Alessandrino
San Marino
Giro d'Italia:

Winner stages 1 and 17

1961
Coppa Sabatini
Giro della Provincia di Reggio Calabria
1962
Arras
GP Tarentaise Briançon
Tour de France:

Winner stage 21

1963
Coppa Sabatini
1969
Alessandrino
