= Masazumi Tajima =

Japanese cyclist

Personal information
- Born: 5 April 1933 (age 93)

Cycling career
- Sport: Cycling

Masazumi Tajima (田島 正純, Tajima Masazumi; born 5 April 1933) is a Japanese cyclist, he competed in the 1952 Summer Olympics.

== Performance at the 1952 Olympics ==
He competed in three events at the 1952 Summer Olympics, one of which was track and two of which were road races. Of these the only race he placed in was the 4000m men's team pursuit, with 19th place, as he did not finish either of the road races.
