= Adrie Voorting =

Dutch cyclist (1931–1961)

Adri Voorting
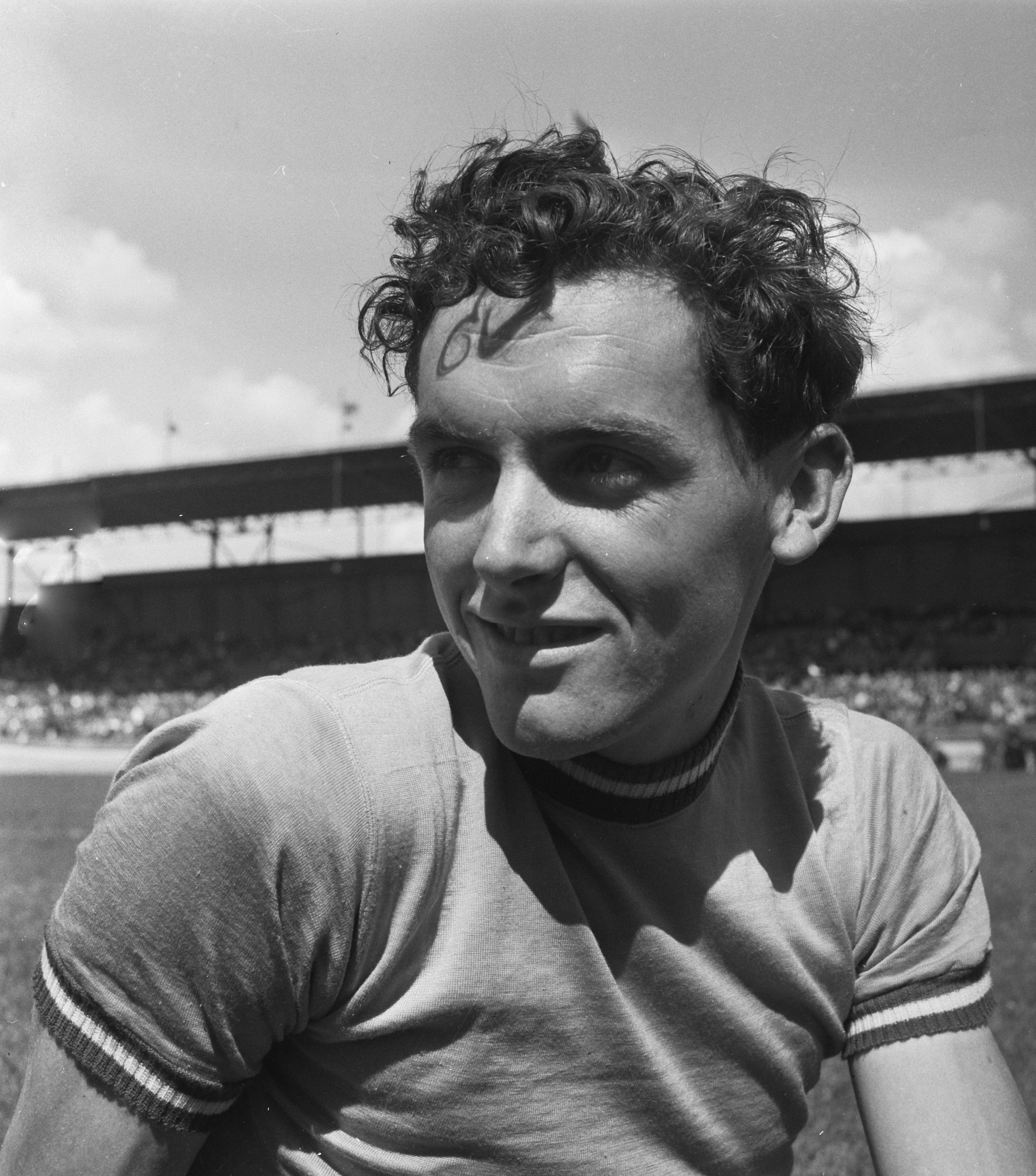
- Adri Voorting in 1952

Personal information
- Born: 15 February 1931 Haarlem, the Netherlands
- Died: 1 August 1961 (aged 30) Bergen op Zoom, the Netherlands

Cycling career
- Sport: Cycling
- Disciplines: Road and track

Adrianus ("Adri" or "Adrie") Voorting (15 February 1931 – 1 August 1961) was a road bicycle and track cyclist from the Netherlands, who represented his native country at the 1952 Summer Olympics in Helsinki, Finland. There he was eliminated in the quarterfinals of the men's 4,000 m team pursuit, alongside Jan Plantaz, Daan de Groot and Jules Maenen. In the individual road race Voorting ended up in 49th place.

He died a few days after a traffic accident, aged 30. His elder brother Gerrit was also an Olympic cyclist.

== See also ==
- List of Dutch Olympic cyclists
