= Kim Ho-soon (cyclist) =

South Korean cyclist

- Hangul: 김호순
- Hanja: 金好順
- RR: Gim Hosun
- MR: Kim Hosun

Kim Ho-soon
Personal information
- Born: 1926 (age 99–100)

Cycling career
- Sport: Cycling

Kim Ho-soon (Korean: 김호순; born 1926) is a South Korean former cyclist. He competed at the 1952 and 1956 Summer Olympics. In 1956, Kim Ho-soon finished 37th on the men's individual road out of 88 at the Korea Cycling Olympics for the first time in Olympic history.
