= Alfred Tonello =

French cyclist (1929–1996)

- Road racing cyclist from France

Personal information
- Born: 11 March 1929 Paris, France
- Died: 21 December 1996 (aged 67) Bondy, France

Cycling career
- Sport: Cycling
Medal record
Men's cycling
Representing France
Olympic Games
Bronze medal – third place	1952 Helsinki	Team road race

Alfred "Sigisfredo" Tonello (11 March 1929 – 21 December 1996) was a road racing cyclist from France, who won the bronze medal in the men's team road race at the 1952 Summer Olympics, alongside Jacques Anquetil and Claude Rouer. He was a professional rider from 1953 to 1959.
