= Im Sang-jo =

South Korean cyclist (1930–2004)

Personal information
- Born: 16 May 1930
- Died: 13 September 2004 (aged 74) Chuncheon, South Korea

Cycling career
- Sport: Cycling

Im Sang-jo (Korean: 임상조; 16 May 1930 – 13 September 2004) was a South Korean cyclist. He competed at the 1952 and 1956 Summer Olympics.
