= Gwon Ik-hyeon =

South Korean cyclist (1920–2002)

Personal information
- Born: 19 February 1920
- Died: 2002 (aged 81–82)

Cycling career
- Sport: Cycling
- Discipline: Road
- Role: Rider

- Gwon Ik-hyeon
- Hangul: 권익현
- Hanja: 權益鉉
- RR: Gwon Ikhyeon
- MR: Kwŏn Ikhyŏn

Gwon Ik-hyeon (19 February 1920 – 2002) was a South Korean racing cyclist. He competed at the 1948 and 1952 Summer Olympics.
