= Claude Rouer =

French cyclist (1929–2021)

Personal information
- Full name: Claude Rouer
- Born: 25 October 1929 Paris, France
- Died: 23 July 2021 (aged 91)

Cycling career
- Sport: Cycling
- Current team: Retired
- Discipline: Road
- Role: Rider

Professional team
- 1953–1955: –
Medal record
Men's cycling
Representing France
Olympic Games
Bronze medal – third place	1952 Helsinki	Team Road Race

Claude Rouer (25 October 1929 – 23 July 2021) was a road cyclist from France, who at the 1952 Summer Olympics won the bronze medal in the men's team road race, alongside Jacques Anquetil and Alfred Tonello. He was a professional rider from 1953 to 1955. In 1953, he was the lanterne rouge of the Tour de France.
