= Iran at the 1952 Summer Olympics =

- IOC code: IRI (IRN used at these Games)
- NOC: National Olympic Committee of Iran

in Helsinki, Finland
- Competitors: 22 in 4 sports
- Flag bearer: Mahmoud Namjoo
- Medals Ranked 30th: Gold 0 Silver 3 Bronze 4 Total 7

Summer Olympics appearances (overview)
- 1900; 1904–1936; 1948; 1952; 1956; 1960; 1964; 1968; 1972; 1976; 1980–1984; 1988; 1992; 1996; 2000; 2004; 2008; 2012; 2016; 2020; 2024; 2028

Iran competed at the 1952 Summer Olympics in Helsinki, Finland. 22 athletes represented Iran in the 1952 Olympics.

== Competitors ==
| Sport | Men | Women | Total |
|---|---|---|---|
| Athletics | 1 | | 1 |
| Boxing | 6 | | 6 |
| Weightlifting | 7 | | 7 |
| Wrestling | 8 | | 8 |
| Total | 22 | 0 | 22 |

== Medal summary ==
=== Medal table ===
| Sport | Gold | Silver | Bronze | Total |
|---|---|---|---|---|
| Weightlifting | | 1 | 1 | 2 |
| Wrestling | | 2 | 3 | 5 |
| Total | 0 | 3 | 4 | 7 |

=== Medalists ===
| Medal | Name | Sport | Event |
|---|---|---|---|
| Silver | Mahmoud Namjoo | Weightlifting | Men's 56 kg |
| Silver | Nasser Givehchi | Wrestling | Men's freestyle 62 kg |
| Silver | Gholamreza Takhti | Wrestling | Men's freestyle 79 kg |
| Bronze | Ali Mirzaei | Weightlifting | Men's 56 kg |
| Bronze | Mahmoud Mollaghasemi | Wrestling | Men's freestyle 52 kg |
| Bronze | Tofigh Jahanbakht | Wrestling | Men's freestyle 67 kg |
| Bronze | Abdollah Mojtabavi | Wrestling | Men's freestyle 73 kg |

== Results by event ==
=== Athletics ===
Men

| Athlete | Event | First round | | | Final | | Rank |
| Athlete | Event | Heat | Time | Rank | Time | Rank | Rank |
|---|---|---|---|---|---|---|---|
| Ali Baghbanbashi | 5000 m | 2 | 15:03.0 | 11 | Did not advance | | 36 |
| Ali Baghbanbashi | 3000 m steeplechase | 2 | 9:13.2 | 6 | Did not advance | | 17 |

=== Boxing ===
Men

| Athlete | Event | First round | Second round | Quarterfinal | Semifinal | Final | Rank |
|---|---|---|---|---|---|---|---|
| Fazlollah Nikkhah | 54 kg | Bye | Kang (KOR); L 0–3 | Did not advance | | | 9 |
| Emmanuel Agassi | 57 kg | Leisching (RSA); L 0–3 | Did not advance | | | | 17 |
| Petros Nazarbegian | 60 kg | Bye | Pakkanen (FIN); L 0–3 | Did not advance | | | 9 |
| Ebrahim Afsharpour | 63.5 kg | Milligan (IRL); L 0–3 | Did not advance | | | | 17 |
| George Issabeg | 67 kg | Abdelrahman (EGY); W Disqualification | Linneman (NED); L 1–2 | Did not advance | | | 9 |
| Ardashes Saginian | 71 kg | Herrera (ARG); L 0–3 | Did not advance | | | | 17 |

=== Weightlifting ===
Men

| Athlete | Event | Press | Snatch | Clean & Jerk | Total | Rank |
|---|---|---|---|---|---|---|
| Ali Mirzaei | 56 kg | 95.0 | 92.5 | 112.5 | 300.0 | 3rd place, bronze medalist(s) |
| Mahmoud Namjoo | 56 kg | 90.0 | 95.0 | 122.5 | 307.5 | 2nd place, silver medalist(s) |
| Mohsen Tabatabaei | 60 kg | 90.0 | 97.5 | 120.0 | 307.5 | 8 |
| Hassan Ferdos | 67.5 kg | 102.5 | 107.5 | 135.0 | 345.0 | 5 |
| Jalal Mansouri | 75 kg | 110.0 | 107.5 | 140.0 | 357.5 | 8 |
| Hassan Rahnavardi | 82.5 kg | 120.0 | 122.5 | 160.0 | 402.5 | 4 |
| Firouz Pojhan | 90 kg | 112.5 | 120.0 | 155.0 | 387.5 | 5 |

=== Wrestling ===
Men's freestyle

| Athlete | Event | First round | Second round | Third round | Fourth round | Fifth round | Final round | Rank |
|---|---|---|---|---|---|---|---|---|
| Mahmoud Mollaghasemi | 52 kg | Das (IND); W Fall | Baise (RSA); W Fall | Weber (GER); W 3–0 | Gemici (TUR); W 2–1 | Sayadov (URS); W 2–1 | Kitano (JPN); L 0–3 | 3rd place, bronze medalist(s) |
| Mehdi Yaghoubi | 57 kg | Mammadbeyov (URS); L Fall | Borders (USA); W 3–0 | Shehata (EGY); W 3–0 | Did not advance | | | 8 |
| Nasser Givehchi | 62 kg | Hall (GBR); W 3–0 | Bye | Mangave (IND); W 3–0 | Essawi (EGY); W 2–1 | Tominaga (JPN); W 2–1 | Şit (TUR); L 0–3 | 2nd place, silver medalist(s) |
| Nasser Givehchi | 62 kg | Hall (GBR); W 3–0 | Bye | Mangave (IND); W 3–0 | Essawi (EGY); W 2–1 | Tominaga (JPN); W 2–1 | Henson (USA); W 2–1 | 2nd place, silver medalist(s) |
| Tofigh Jahanbakht | 67 kg | Gál (HUN); W 3–0 | Myland (GBR); W Fall | Yüce (TUR); W 2–1 | Nettesheim (GER); W 2–1 | Yaltyryan (URS); W 3–0 | Anderberg (SWE); L 0–3 | 3rd place, bronze medalist(s) |
| Tofigh Jahanbakht | 67 kg | Gál (HUN); W 3–0 | Myland (GBR); W Fall | Yüce (TUR); W 2–1 | Nettesheim (GER); W 2–1 | Yaltyryan (URS); W 3–0 | Evans (USA); L 0–3 | 3rd place, bronze medalist(s) |
| Abdollah Mojtabavi | 73 kg | Keisala (FIN); W 2–1 | Rybalko (URS); W 2–1 | Scott (AUS); W 3–0 | Yamazaki (JPN); W 3–0 | | Berlin (SWE); W 3–0 | 3rd place, bronze medalist(s) |
| Abdollah Mojtabavi | 73 kg | Keisala (FIN); W 2–1 | Rybalko (URS); W 2–1 | Scott (AUS); W 3–0 | Yamazaki (JPN); W 3–0 | | Smith (USA); L 0–3 | 3rd place, bronze medalist(s) |
| Gholamreza Takhti | 79 kg | Brunaud (FRA); W Fall | Lahti (FIN); W Fall | Genuth (ARG); W Fall | Zafer (TUR); W 3–0 | Gocke (GER); W 3–0 | Tsimakuridze (URS); L 1–2 | 2nd place, silver medalist(s) |
| Gholamreza Takhti | 79 kg | Brunaud (FRA); W Fall | Lahti (FIN); W Fall | Genuth (ARG); W Fall | Zafer (TUR); W 3–0 | Gocke (GER); W 3–0 | Gurics (HUN); W Walkover | 2nd place, silver medalist(s) |
| Abbas Zandi | 87 kg | Bye | Coote (AUS); W 3–0 | Sepponen (FIN); W 3–0 | Palm (SWE); L 1–2 | Did not advance | | 5 |
| Ahmad Vafadar | +87 kg | Kangasniemi (FIN); L Fall | Atan (TUR); L 1–2 | Did not advance | | | Did not advance | 9 |
