= Wrestling at the 1952 Summer Olympics – Men's Greco-Roman welterweight =

Wrestling at the Olympics

Men's Greco-Roman welterweight at the Games of the XV Olympiad
- Venue: Messuhalli
- Dates: 24–27 July 1952
- Competitors: 18 from 18 nations

Medalists
1st place, gold medalist(s)		Miklós Szilvásy	Hungary
2nd place, silver medalist(s)		Gösta Andersson	Sweden
3rd place, bronze medalist(s)		Khalil Taha	Lebanon

The men's Greco-Roman welterweight competition at the 1952 Summer Olympics in Helsinki took place from 24 July to 27 July at Messuhalli. Nations were limited to one competitor. Welterweight was the fourth-heaviest category, including wrestlers weighing 67 to 73 kilograms (147.7 to 160.9 lb).

== Competition format ==
This Greco-Roman wrestling competition continued to use the "bad points" elimination system introduced at the 1928 Summer Olympics for Greco-Roman and at the 1932 Summer Olympics for freestyle wrestling, removing the slight modification introduced in 1936 and used until 1948 (which had a reduced penalty for a loss by 2–1 decision). Each round featured all wrestlers pairing off and wrestling one bout (with one wrestler having a bye if there were an odd number). The loser received 3 points. The winner received 1 point if the win was by decision and 0 points if the win was by fall. At the end of each round, any wrestler with at least 5 points was eliminated. This elimination continued until the medal rounds, which began when 3 wrestlers remained. These 3 wrestlers each faced each other in a round-robin medal round (with earlier results counting, if any had wrestled another before); record within the medal round determined medals, with bad points breaking ties.

== Results ==
=== Round 1 ===
Bouts

Winner	Nation	Victory Type	Loser	Nation
Osvaldo Riva	Italy	Decision, 2–1	Bela Čuzdi	Yugoslavia
Veikko Männikkö	Finland	Decision, 3–0	Marin Beluşica	Romania
Semyon Marushkin	Soviet Union	Decision, 3–0	Vladislav Sekal	Czechoslovakia
Ahmet Şenol	Turkey	Decision, 3–0	Antoni Gołaś	Poland
Khalil Taha	Lebanon	Decision, 3–0	Heng Freylinger	Luxembourg
René Chesneau	France	Decision, 3–0	Gottfried Anglberger	Austria
Mohamed Ahmed Osman	Egypt	Fall	Jos De Jong	Belgium
Miklós Szilvásy	Hungary	Fall	Håkon Olsen	Norway
Gösta Andersson	Sweden	Fall	Anton Mackowiak	Germany

Points

Rank	Wrestler	Nation	Start	Earned	Total
1	Gösta Andersson	Sweden	0	0	0
1	Mohamed Ahmed Osman	Egypt	0	0	0
1	Miklós Szilvásy	Hungary	0	0	0
4	René Chesneau	France	0	1	1
4	Veikko Männikkö	Finland	0	1	1
4	Semyon Marushkin	Soviet Union	0	1	1
4	Osvaldo Riva	Italy	0	1	1
4	Ahmet Şenol	Turkey	0	1	1
4	Khalil Taha	Lebanon	0	1	1
10	Gottfried Anglberger	Austria	0	3	3
10	Marin Beluşica	Romania	0	3	3
10	Bela Čuzdi	Yugoslavia	0	3	3
10	Jos De Jong	Belgium	0	3	3
10	Heng Freylinger	Luxembourg	0	3	3
10	Antoni Gołaś	Poland	0	3	3
10	Anton Mackowiak	Germany	0	3	3
10	Håkon Olsen	Norway	0	3	3
10	Vladislav Sekal	Czechoslovakia	0	3	3

=== Round 2 ===
Männikkö withdrew after his bout.

Bouts

Winner	Nation	Victory Type	Loser	Nation
Marin Beluşica	Romania	Decision, 3–0	Bela Čuzdi	Yugoslavia
Osvaldo Riva	Italy	Decision, 2–1	Veikko Männikkö	Finland
Semyon Marushkin	Soviet Union	Decision, 3–0	Antoni Gołaś	Poland
Ahmet Şenol	Turkey	Decision, 3–0	Vladislav Sekal	Czechoslovakia
Gottfried Anglberger	Austria	Decision, 3–0	Heng Freylinger	Luxembourg
Khalil Taha	Lebanon	Fall	René Chesneau	France
Miklós Szilvásy	Hungary	Fall	Mohamed Ahmed Osman	Egypt
Anton Mackowiak	Germany	Fall	Jos De Jong	Belgium
Gösta Andersson	Sweden	Fall	Håkon Olsen	Norway

Points

Rank	Wrestler	Nation	Start	Earned	Total
1	Gösta Andersson	Sweden	0	0	0
1	Miklós Szilvásy	Hungary	0	0	0
3	Khalil Taha	Lebanon	1	0	1
4	Semyon Marushkin	Soviet Union	1	1	2
4	Osvaldo Riva	Italy	1	1	2
4	Ahmet Şenol	Turkey	1	1	2
7	Anton Mackowiak	Germany	3	0	3
7	Mohamed Ahmed Osman	Egypt	0	3	3
9	Gottfried Anglberger	Austria	3	1	4
9	Marin Beluşica	Romania	3	1	4
9	René Chesneau	France	1	3	4
12	Veikko Männikkö	Finland	1	3	4*
13	Bela Čuzdi	Yugoslavia	3	3	6
13	Jos De Jong	Belgium	3	3	6
13	Heng Freylinger	Luxembourg	3	3	6
13	Antoni Gołaś	Poland	3	3	6
13	Håkon Olsen	Norway	3	3	6
13	Vladislav Sekal	Czechoslovakia	3	3	6

=== Round 3 ===
Bouts

Winner	Nation	Victory Type	Loser	Nation
Marin Beluşica	Romania	Decision, 3–0	Osvaldo Riva	Italy
Semyon Marushkin	Soviet Union	Decision, 3–0	Ahmet Şenol	Turkey
Khalil Taha	Lebanon	Decision, 3–0	Gottfried Anglberger	Austria
René Chesneau	France	Decision, 3–0	Mohamed Ahmed Osman	Egypt
Miklós Szilvásy	Hungary	Decision, 3–0	Anton Mackowiak	Germany
Gösta Andersson	Sweden	Bye	N/A	N/A

Points

Rank	Wrestler	Nation	Start	Earned	Total
1	Gösta Andersson	Sweden	0	0	0
2	Miklós Szilvásy	Hungary	0	1	1
3	Khalil Taha	Lebanon	1	1	2
4	Semyon Marushkin	Soviet Union	2	1	3
5	Marin Beluşica	Romania	4	1	5
5	René Chesneau	France	4	1	5
5	Osvaldo Riva	Italy	2	3	5
5	Ahmet Şenol	Turkey	2	3	5
9	Anton Mackowiak	Germany	3	3	6
9	Mohamed Ahmed Osman	Egypt	3	3	6
11	Gottfried Anglberger	Austria	4	3	7

=== Round 4 ===
Bouts

Winner	Nation	Victory Type	Loser	Nation
Gösta Andersson	Sweden	Decision, 3–0	Semyon Marushkin	Soviet Union
Miklós Szilvásy	Hungary	Fall	Khalil Taha	Lebanon

Points

Rank	Wrestler	Nation	Start	Earned	Total
1	Gösta Andersson	Sweden	0	1	1
1	Miklós Szilvásy	Hungary	1	0	1
3	Khalil Taha	Lebanon	2	3	5
4	Semyon Marushkin	Soviet Union	3	3	6

=== Medal rounds ===
Szilvásy's victory over Taha in round 4 counted for the medal rounds.

Bouts

Winner	Nation	Victory Type	Loser	Nation
Gösta Andersson	Sweden	Decision, 3–0	Khalil Taha	Lebanon
Miklós Szilvásy	Hungary	Decision, 2–1	Gösta Andersson	Sweden

Points

Rank	Wrestler	Nation	Wins	Losses	Start	Earned	Total
1st place, gold medalist(s)	Miklós Szilvásy	Hungary	2	0	1	1	2
2nd place, silver medalist(s)	Gösta Andersson	Sweden	1	1	1	4	5
3rd place, bronze medalist(s)	Khalil Taha	Lebanon	0	2	5	3	8
