= Deaths in January 1997 =

The following is a list of notable deaths in January 1997.

Entries for each day are listed alphabetically by surname. A typical entry lists information in the following sequence:

- Name, age, country of citizenship at birth, subsequent country of citizenship (if applicable), reason for notability, cause of death (if known), and reference.

== January 1997 ==
=== 1 ===
- Prince Eugen of Bavaria, 71, German noble.
- Aenne Brauksiepe, 84, German politician.
- Asnoldo Devonish, 64, Venezuelan track and field athlete and Olympian (1952).
- Al Eugster, 87, American animator, writer, and film director.
- Jean Feller, 77, Luxembourgish Olympic footballer (1948).
- Ivan Graziani, 51, Italian singer-songwriter and guitarist, colon cancer.
- Hagood Hardy, 59, Canadian composer, pianist, and vibraphonist, lymphoma.
- Ham Harmon, 83, American football player (Chicago Cardinals).
- Mohammed Hafez Ismail, 77, Egyptian diplomat and ambassador.
- Graham Kersey, 25, English cricketer, traffic collision.
- Hans-Martin Majewski, 85, German composer of film scores.
- James B. Pritchard, 87, American archeologist.
- Joan Rice, 66, English film actress.
- Franco Volpi, 75, Italian actor and voice actor, cancer.
- Townes Van Zandt, 52, American singer-songwriter, cardiac arrhythmia.
- Ladislau Zilahi, 74, Romanian football player and manager.

=== 2 ===
- Randy California, 45, American guitarist, singer and songwriter, drowned.
- Samuel Carlisi, 82, American mobster, heart attack.
- Aarne Castrén, 73, Finnish Olympic sailor (1952).
- Joan Coromines, 91, Spanish linguist.
- Antonio Giordani Soika, 83, Italian entomologist and ecologist.
- Moshe Wilensky, 86, Polish-Israeli composer.

=== 3 ===
- Werner Genuit, 59, German classical pianist and composer.
- Roger Goeb, 82, American composer.
- Michel Heller, 74, Russian historian, heart attack.
- Pieter Keuneman, 79, Sri Lankan communist politician.
- Jon Lennart Mjøen, 84, Norwegian actor, film director and screenwriter.
- Gianfranco Pandolfini, 76, Italian Olympic water polo player (1948).
- Marie Torre, 72, American television journalist, lung cancer.
- Odd Øyen, 82, Norwegian physician and resistance member during World War II.

=== 4 ===
- Hédi Berkhissa, 24, Tunisian footballer, heart attack.
- Akhteruzzaman Elias, 53, Bangladeshi novelist and short story writer.
- Harry Helmsley, 87, American real estate mogul, pneumonia.
- Harry P. Jeffrey, 95, American attorney and politician, member of the United States House of Representatives (1943-1945).
- Bill Lancaster, 49, American screenwriter (The Thing, The Bad News Bears) and actor (Moses the Lawgiver).
- Lucien Rebuffic, 75, French Olympic basketball player (1948).
- Tormod Skagestad, 76, Norwegian poet, novelist, playwright and actor.
- Richard Taitano, 75, Guamanian politician.

=== 5 ===
- André Franquin, 73, Belgian comics artist, (Spirou & Fantasio, Gaston, Marsupilami), heart attack.
- Peter Zack Geer, 68, American politician, cancer.
- Prince Bertil, Duke of Halland, 84, Swedish royal, third son of King Gustaf VI Adolf.
- Homer Hobbs, 73, American football player (San Francisco 49ers), and coach.
- Burton Lane, 84, American composer and lyricist.
- Frans Piët, 91, Dutch comics artist (Sjors en Sjimmie).
- Emil Roy, 89, American baseball player (Philadelphia Athletics).
- Alvaro de Toledo, 75, Brazilian Olympic equestrian (1952).
- V. C. Wynne-Edwards, 90, English zoologist.

=== 6 ===
- Herbert Blitzstein, 62, American mobster, shot.
- Dick Donovan, 69, American MLB baseball player, cancer.
- Kalevi Laitinen, 78, Finnish gymnast and Olympic champion (1948, 1952).
- Teiichi Matsumaru, 87, Japanese football player.
- Heinrich Müller, 70, Swiss Olympic cyclist (1952).
- Charles Murphy, 88, Australian politician.
- Catherine Scorsese, 84, Italian-American actress (Goodfellas), Alzheimer's disease.

=== 7 ===
- Francisco Castillo, 75, Spanish Olympic water polo player (1948, 1952).
- Tod Goodwin, 85, American gridiron football player (New York Giants).
- Paul-Werner Hozzel, 86, Nazi Germany Luftwaffe pilot during World War II.
- Christopher Mayhew, 81, British politician.
- Patricia McLaughlin, 80, Northern Irish politician.
- Sándor Végh, 84, Hungarian-French violinist and conductor.
- Alfred Vincelette, 61, American Olympic skier (1960).

=== 8 ===
- Sidney Aronovitz, 76, American district judge (United States District Court for the Southern District of Florida).
- Smiley Bates, 59, Canadian country singer, songwriter, and musician, cancer.
- Melvin Calvin, 85, American biochemist, heart failure.
- Paul Endacott, 94, American basketball player.
- James Fraser, 72, Scottish surgeon.
- Harold Foote Gosnell, 100, American political scientist and author.
- George Handy, 76, American jazz arranger, composer and pianist.
- Phyllis Hartnoll, 90, British poet, author and editor.
- Alfred John Markiewicz, 68, American prelate of the Catholic Church.

=== 9 ===
- Karol Borhy, 84, Czechoslovak football coach.
- Ove Dahlberg, 65, Swedish ice hockey referee, heart attack.
- Herb Davis, 97, American football player.
- Angelo Drossos, 68, American basketball executive, Parkinson's disease.
- Ellen Griffin Dunne, 64, American actress and activist, multiple sclerosis.
- Muhammadu Junaidu, 91, Nigerian historian and writer.
- Fortunato Maninetti, 76, Italian rower and Olympian (1948).
- Shorty McWilliams, 70, American football player (Los Angeles Dons, Pittsburgh Steelers).
- Edward Osóbka-Morawski, 87, Polish activist and politician.
- Jesse White, 79, American actor and comedian, heart attack.

=== 10 ===
- Mary Bancroft, 93, American novelist and spy.
- Samuel Preston Bayard, 88, American folklorist and musicologist.
- Emmet Reid Blake, 88, American ornithologist and museum curator.
- Gordon W. Burrows, 70, American politician, cardiac arrest.
- André Caron, 52, Canadian politician, member of the House of Commons of Canada (1993- ), cancer.
- Bela Čuzdi, 70, Yugoslavian Olympic wrestler (1952).
- János Erdei, 77, Hungarian Olympic boxer (1952).
- Seymour Halpern, 83, American politician, member of the United States House of Representatives (1959-1973).
- Elspeth Huxley, 89, English author, journalist, broadcaster, and government adviser.
- Valentin Koptyug, 65, Soviet/Russian chemist.
- Allan Livingstone, 68, Australian Olympic canoeist (1960).
- Phil Marchildon, 83, Canadian Major League Baseball player (Philadelphia Athletics, Boston Red Sox).
- Tordis Maurstad, 95, Norwegian stage actress.
- Nick Picciuto, 75, American baseball player (Philadelphia Phillies).
- Martin Pike, 76, British athlete and Olympian (1948).
- Alec Todd, Baron Todd, 89, Scottish biochemist and Nobel Prize laureate, heart attack.
- Shiv Verma, 92, Indian revolutionary.
- Lee Willerman, 57, American psychologist.
- Albert Wohlstetter, 83, American nuclear strategist.
- George Young, 74, Scottish footballer.

=== 11 ===
- Arild Andersen, 68, Norwegian racing cyclist.
- William Byrne, 90, American painter.
- Bhabatosh Datta, 85, Indian economist, academic and writer.
- Carol Habben, 63, American baseball player.
- Rosalind Hill, 88, English historian, heart failure.
- Pancheti Koteswaram, 81, Indian meteorologist, hydrologist, and atmospheric physicist.
- Sheldon Leonard, 89, American actor, producer, director, and writer.
- Stu Martin, 84, American Major League Baseball player (St. Louis Cardinals, Pittsburgh Pirates, Chicago Cubs).
- Jerry Neudecker, 66, American MLB umpire, cancer.
- Helen Foster Snow, 89, American journalist.
- Jill Summers, 86, English music hall performer and comedian, kidney failure.
- Ian White-Thomson, 92, British Anglican priest.
- Elizabeth Woolsey, 88, American alpine skier and Olympian (1936).

=== 12 ===
- Harold Brown, 76, Canadian ice hockey player (New York Rangers).
- Jean-Edern Hallier, 60, French writer, critic and editor, cerebral haemorrhage after fall, heart attack, traffic collision.
- Jean Hoerni, 72, Swiss-American engineer.
- Charles Brenton Huggins, 95, Canadian-American cancer researcher and Nobel Prize in Physiology or Medicine laureate.
- Ewa Larysa Krause, 22, Polish Olympic judoka (1996), traffic collision.
- Wally Rose, 83, American jazz and ragtime pianist.
- Joe Scott, 78, American baseball player.
- Jorge Suárez, 51, Salvadoran football player, cancer.

=== 13 ===
- Sivar Arnér, 87, Swedish novelist and playwright.
- Burton Barr, 79, American businessman and politician, kidney failure.
- Ernest Bayer, 92, American Olympic rower (1928).
- Johannes Coleman, 86, South African marathon runner and Olympian (1936, 1948).
- Archibald Jack, 83, British Olympic modern pentathlete (1936).
- Max Kaser, 90, German academic and professor of jurisprudence.
- Leo Margolis, 69, Canadian parasitologist, heart attack.
- Baburaoji Parkhe, 84, Indian industrialist.
- Jack Simpson, 76, Irish cricketer.
- Ruslan Stratonovich, 66, Russian physicist and engineer.
- Herman V. Wall, 91, American combat photographer during World War II.

=== 14 ===
- John Amdisen, 62, Danish football player.
- Shalva Chikhladze, 84, Soviet Georgian light-heavyweight wrestler and Olympian (1952).
- Leonard Dodson, 84, American golfer.
- Celso Ferreira, 46, Brazilian Olympic football player (1972).
- King Hu, 64, Chinese film director and actor, complications from angioplasty.
- Robert Irsay, 73, American football team owner.
- Tommy Laskey, 83, Australian rules footballer.
- John Lettengarver, 67, American figure skater and Olympian (1948).
- Ebba Lodden, 83, Norwegian civil servant and politician.
- Roland Martin, 84, French archaeologist.
- Dollard Ménard, 83, Canadian general.
- Knud Nellemose, 88, Danish sculptor.

=== 15 ===
- Oscar Auerbach, 92, American physician and pathologist.
- Jean-Marie Grenot, 67, French Olympic boxer (1948).
- Burrell Shields, 67, American football player (Pittsburgh Steelers, Baltimore Colts).
- Edwin Smith, 74, New Zealand rower.
- Ahmad Tafazzoli, 59, Iranian Iranist and professor of ancient Iranian languages, homicide. (body discovered on this date)
- Kenneth V. Thimann, 92, English-American plant physiologist and microbiologist.

=== 16 ===
- Romano Amerio, 91, Swiss Italian theologian.
- Ödön Gróf, 81, Hungarian Olympic swimmer (1936).
- Roy Henderson, 73, Scottish football player.
- Markus Hoffmann, 26, German actor, suicide by jumping.
- Nils Katajainen, 77, Finnish flying ace during World War II.
- Erik Källström, 88, Swedish Olympic football player (1936).
- Fritzi Metznerová, 81, Czech Olympic figure skater (1936).
- Iain Mills, 56, English politician.
- Shinobu Muraki, 73, Japanese production designer and art director (Ran).
- Beverly Peer, 84, American jazz double-bassist, cancer.
- Martin Redmond, 59, British politician.
- Juan Landázuri Ricketts, 83, Peruvian catholic cardinal.
- Jeff Teale, 57, British international athlete and Olympian (1968).
- Rajagopala Tondaiman, 74, Indian monarch and the last Raja of Pudukkottai.
- Barbara Woodell, 86, American actress.
- Willie Yeadon, 89, British railway historian.

=== 17 ===
- Susanna Al-Hassan, 69, Ghanaian author and politician.
- Earl Girard, 69, American football player (Green Bay Packers, Detroit Lions, Pittsburgh Steelers).
- Robert Giraud, 75, French journalist, poet and lexicographer.
- Björn Isfält, 54, Swedish composer, cancer.
- Bill Kardash, 84, Canadian politician.
- Bert Kelly, 84, Australian politician and government minister.
- Amha Selassie, 80, Ethiopian Emperor-in-exile and son of Haile Selassie I.
- Clyde Tombaugh, 90, American astronomer.
- Theo Wilson, 79, American reporter, cerebral hemorrhage.

=== 18 ===
- Herbert A. Allen, Sr., 88, American stockbroker.
- Ruth Brinkmann, 62, American actress and founder of Vienna's English Theatre, ovarian cancer.
- Keith Diamond, 46, American songwriter and producer, heart attack.
- Jean Gravelle, 69, Canadian ice hockey player and Olympian (1948).
- Henry Hermansen, 75, Norwegian cross-country skier and Olympian (1960).
- Ardis Krainik, 67, American mezzo-soprano opera singer.
- Diana Lewis, 77, American film actress, pancreatic cancer.
- Myfanwy Piper, 85, British art critic and opera librettist.
- Gilberto Martínez Solares, 90, Mexican actor, cinematographer, screenwriter, and director.
- Darío Suro, 79, Dominican Republic art critic, diplomat and painter.
- Paul Tsongas, 55, American politician, non-Hodgkin lymphoma.

=== 19 ===
- Adriana Caselotti, 80, American actress and singer (Snow White and the Seven Dwarfs), lung cancer.
- Robert Chapatte, 75, French cyclist and sports journalist.
- James Dickey, 73, American poet and novelist.
- Richard E. Jennings, 75, English comics artist, pneumonia.
- Ernst Knoll, 56, German Olympic wrestler (1968, 1972).
- Bert Kuczynski, 77, American baseball (Philadelphia Athletics), and football player (Philadelphia Eagles, Detroit Lions).
- William Laing, 68, Ghanaian triple jumper and Olympian (1952).
- Tamara Makarova, 89, Soviet actress.
- Vasily Nalimov, 86, Russian philosopher and humanist.
- Charles Nelson, 95, American film editor (Picnic, Cat Ballou, A Song to Remember), Oscar winner (1956).
- Charlie Price, 79, Australian cricketer.
- Sudhir, 75, Pakistani film actor, director and producer.

=== 20 ===
- Eric Andersen, 92, Australian rules footballer.
- Albín Brunovský, 61, Slovak painter and graphic artist.
- Curt Flood, 59, American baseball player (Cincinnati Redlegs, St. Louis Cardinals, Washington Senators), pneumonia.
- Edith Haisman, 100, South African-born RMS Titanic survivor
- Johannes Human, 66, South African Olympic sports shooter (1956, 1960).
- Giorgio Jegher, 59, Italian Olympic long-distance runner (1964).
- Hiram Keller, 52, American actor, liver cancer.
- Joseph J. Loferski, 71, American physicist.
- Ashious Melu, 39, Zambian footballer, coach, and Olympian (1988).
- Konrad Püschel, 89, German architect, town planner, and university professor.
- Dennis Main Wilson, 72, British radio and television producer, lung cancer.

=== 21 ===
- Eduardo Assam, 77, Mexican Olympic wrestler (1948, 1952).
- John Glyn-Jones, 87, British actor.
- Hans Egon Holthusen, 83, German nazi, writer and academic.
- Sourendra Nath Kohli, 80, Indian Navy admiral.
- Irwin Levine, 58, American songwriter.
- Bill McWilliams, 86, American baseball player (Boston Red Sox).
- Louis Miehe-Renard, 77, Danish film actor.
- Shinroku Momose, 77, Japanese aircraft/automotive engineer.
- Eduardo Morera, 91, Argentine film director.
- Colonel Tom Parker, 87, Dutch-American manager of Elvis Presley, stroke.
- Giorgio Prosperi, 85, Italian screenwriter.
- Polly Ann Young, 88, American actress, cancer.

=== 22 ===
- Ênio Andrade, 68, Brazilian football player and manager.
- L. Kijungluba AO, 90, Indian baptist missionary.
- Pilar Barbosa, 98, Puerto Rican educator, historian and political activist.
- George Dockins, 79, American baseball player (St. Louis Cardinals, Brooklyn Dodgers).
- Ron Holden, 57, American pop and R&B singer, heart attack.
- Elwyn Lynn, 79, Australian artist, author and art critic.
- Billy Mackenzie, 39, Scottish singer and songwriter, suicide by drug overdose.
- Mollie Panter-Downes, 90, British novelist and columnist.
- Cornelio Reyna, 56, Mexican singer, composer and actor.
- Willy Van Rompaey, 85, Belgian Olympic sailor (1928, 1948).
- Willard Wheatley, 81, British Virgin Islands politician and Chief Minister.
- Wally Whyton, 67, British musician, songwriter and radio and TV personality.

=== 23 ===
- Richard Berry, 61, American singer, songwriter and musician, aneurysm.
- Paul Egli, 85, Swiss road bicycle racer.
- Randy Greenawalt, 47, American serial killer, execution by lethal injection.
- Alois Hudec, 88, Czechoslovak gymnast and World and Olympic Champion (1936).
- Lyudmila Marchenko, 56, Soviet film actress.
- Hardy Rafn, 66, Danish film actor.
- Roger Tayler, 67, British astronomer, cancer.
- Rolling Thunder, 80, American hippy spiritual leader, complications of diabetes.
- David Waller, 76, English actor.
- Bill Zuckert, 81, American actor, pneumonia.

=== 24 ===
- William Alexander, 81, German painter and television host.
- Lourdino Barreto, 58, Indian musicologist and composer.
- Dr. Jerry Graham, 75, American professional wrestler, cerebrovascular disease.
- Jack Halloran, 81, American composer and choral director.
- Sisko Heikkilä, 75, Finnish Olympic high jumper (1952).
- Ida Kohlmeyer, 84, American painter.
- Roy Sproson, 66, English footballer and manager.
- Suzy Vernon, 95, French film actress.

=== 25 ===
- Werner Aspenström, 78, Swedish poet.
- Dan Barry, 73, American cartoonist.
- Donald Beer, 61, American rower and Olympic champion (1956), brain cancer.
- James Boyd, 66, American boxer and Olympian (1956), cancer.
- Manuel Tuñón de Lara, 81, Spanish historian.
- Jeane Dixon, 93, American astrologer, heart failure.
- Exuma, 54, Bahamian musician, artist, playwright and author, heart attack.
- Carlton Benjamin Goodlett, 82, American physician and newspaper publisher.
- Edith Thacher Hurd, 86, American children's author.
- Nikola Koljević, 60, Bosnian Serb politician, essayist, and scholar, suicide by gunshot.
- George W. Mitchell, 92, American economist.
- Seldon Powell, 68, American jazz, music, and R&B tenor saxophonist and flautist.
- Elizabeth Rudel Smith, 85, American politician.
- Bill Wightkin, 69, American gridiron football player (Chicago Bears).

=== 26 ===
- Sufi Barkat Ali, 85, Indian muslim sufi.
- Jack Clayton, 82, American football, basketball, and baseball coach, congestive heart failure.
- Mercer Davies, 72, South African Olympic long distance runner (1956).
- Frank Dilio, 84, Canadian ice hockey administrator.
- Norman Fawcett, 86, Canadian politician, member of the House of Commons of Canada (1965-1968).
- Shūhei Fujisawa, 69, Japanese author.
- Cornelius Herman Muller, 87, American botanist and ecologist.
- Roberto Queralt, 66, Spanish Olympic swimmer and water polo player (1952).
- Guy Raymond, 85, American actor.
- Margaret Hessen und bei Rhein, 83, German princess.
- Laurence Stoddard, 93, American Olympic rowing coxswain (1924).
- Donald E. Stokes, 69, American political scientist, acute leukemia.
- Mira Zimińska, 95, Polish actress.

=== 27 ===
- Kathryn Beare, 79, American baseball player.
- George Kanngieser, 84, Australian rules footballer.
- Bill Kennedy, 88, American actor and television show host.
- Cecil Arthur Lewis, 98, British last surviving World War I fighter ace.
- Gerald Marks, 96, American composer.
- Louis E. Martin, 84, American journalist, newspaper publisher and civil rights activist.
- Zia Sarhadi, 83, Pakistani screenwriter and film director.
- Harish Chandra Sarin, 82, Indian civil servant, writer and defence secretary of India.
- Richard X. Slattery, 71, American actor.
- Slick Smith, 67, American racing driver.
- David Townsend, 84, English cricket player.
- František Vohryzek, 90, Czech Olympic fencer (1936).
- Aleksandr Zarkhi, 88, Soviet film director, screenwriter, and playwright.

=== 28 ===
- Antônio Callado, 80, Brazilian journalist, playwright, and novelist.
- Edmond de Stoutz, 76, Swiss conductor.
- Anna Galmarini, 54, Italian figure skater and Olympian (1960).
- Raya Garbousova, 87, Russian-American cellist.
- Alfred Gell, 51, British social anthropologist.
- Mikel Koliqi, 96, Albanian cardinal of the Roman Catholic Church.
- Wong Shun Leung, 61, Hong Kong martial artist, stroke.
- Louis Pauwels, 76, French journalist and writer, heart attack.
- Geoffrey Rippon, 72, British politician.
- Pandurang Vasudeo Sukhatme, 85, Indian statistician.

=== 29 ===
- Antal Benda, 86, Hungarian Olympic handball player (1936).
- Irma Greta Blohm, 85, German politician.
- Ken Harada, 77, Japanese politician.
- Daniel P. Mannix, 85, American writer, journalist, animal trainer, and performer.
- Mumtaz Mirza, 57, Indian Urdu poet.
- Clifford Richmond, 82, New Zealand lawyer and judge.
- Osvaldo Soriano, 54, Argentine journalist and writer, lung cancer.
- Thomas Daniel Young, 77, American academic.

=== 30 ===
- Charles Hargens, 103, American painter.
- Willis Harman, 78, American engineer, futurist, and author, brain cancer.
- Harold Jackson, 79, Canadian ice hockey player (Chicago Black Hawks, Detroit Red Wings).
- Duane Josephson, 54, American baseball player (Chicago White Sox, Boston Red Sox).
- Nicholas Mallett, 51, British television director.
- Henry Bentinck, 11th Earl of Portland, 77, British noble and activist.
- Stan Raiman, 82, American basketball player.
- Frank Tejeda, 51, United States Marine and politician, brain cancer, member of the United States House of Representatives (1993- ).

=== 31 ===
- Harold Raymond Ballard, 78, Canadian politician, member of the House of Commons of Canada (1965-1968).
- Raymond Coxon, 100, British artist.
- Hedy Graf, 70, Spanish-Swiss soprano.
- Eve Lister, 83, British actress.
- Seth Lover, 87, American inventor.
- Zahir Pajaziti, 34, Kosovo Albanian guerilla commander, killed in action.
- John Joseph Scanlan, 90, American catholic bishop.
- Eugenia Smith, 98, American Romanov impostor.
- Alexander Solonik, 36, Russian gangster, strangled.
- Andrzej Szczepkowski, 73, Polish actor.
- Hans Tisdall, 86, German-British artist.
