= Wrestling at the 1952 Summer Olympics – Men's freestyle welterweight =

Wrestling at the Olympics

Men's freestyle welterweight at the Games of the XV Olympiad
- Venue: Messuhalli
- Dates: 20–23 July 1952
- Competitors: 20 from 20 nations

Medalists
1st place, gold medalist(s)		William Smith	United States
2nd place, silver medalist(s)		Per Berlin	Sweden
3rd place, bronze medalist(s)		Abdollah Mojtabavi	Iran

The men's freestyle welterweight competition at the 1952 Summer Olympics in Helsinki took place from 20 July to 23 July at Messuhalli. Nations were limited to one competitor. Welterweight was the fourth-heaviest category, including wrestlers weighing 67 to 73 kilograms (147.7 to 160.9 lb).

== Competition format ==
This freestyle wrestling competition continued to use the "bad points" elimination system introduced at the 1928 Summer Olympics for Greco-Roman and at the 1932 Summer Olympics for freestyle wrestling, removing the slight modification introduced in 1936 and used until 1948 (which had a reduced penalty for a loss by 2–1 decision). Each round featured all wrestlers pairing off and wrestling one bout (with one wrestler having a bye if there were an odd number). The loser received 3 points. The winner received 1 point if the win was by decision and 0 points if the win was by fall. At the end of each round, any wrestler with at least 5 points was eliminated. This elimination continued until the medal rounds, which began when 3 wrestlers remained. These 3 wrestlers each faced each other in a round-robin medal round (with earlier results counting, if any had wrestled another before); record within the medal round determined medals, with bad points breaking ties.

== Results ==
=== Round 1 ===
Bouts

Winner	Nation	Victory Type	Loser	Nation
Per Berlin	Sweden	Decision, 3–0	Daniel Hauser	Switzerland
Anton Mackowiak	Germany	Decision, 3–0	Arvedo Cecchini	Italy
Alberto Longarella	Argentina	Decision, 2–1	Nick Mohammed	Canada
William Smith	United States	Fall	Antonio Rosado	Mexico
Cyril Martin	South Africa	Decision, 3–0	Vladislav Sekal	Czechoslovakia
Mohamed Hassan Moussa	Egypt	Fall	Jos De Jong	Belgium
Tsugio Yamazaki	Japan	Decision, 2–1	Jean-Baptiste Leclerc	France
Bev Scott	Australia	Decision, 3–0	Don Irvine	Great Britain
Mehmet Ali Islioğlu	Turkey	Decision, 2–1	Vasyl Rybalko	Soviet Union
Abdollah Mojtabavi	Iran	Decision, 2–1	Aleksanteri Keisala	Finland

Points

Rank	Wrestler	Nation	Start	Earned	Total
1	Mohamed Hassan Moussa	Egypt	0	0	0
1	William Smith	United States	0	0	0
3	Per Berlin	Sweden	0	1	1
3	Mehmet Ali Islioğlu	Turkey	0	1	1
3	Alberto Longarella	Argentina	0	1	1
3	Anton Mackowiak	Germany	0	1	1
3	Cyril Martin	South Africa	0	1	1
3	Abdollah Mojtabavi	Iran	0	1	1
3	Bev Scott	Australia	0	1	1
3	Tsugio Yamazaki	Japan	0	1	1
11	Arvedo Cecchini	Italy	0	3	3
11	Jos De Jong	Belgium	0	3	3
11	Daniel Hauser	Switzerland	0	3	3
11	Don Irvine	Great Britain	0	3	3
11	Aleksanteri Keisala	Finland	0	3	3
11	Jean-Baptiste Leclerc	France	0	3	3
11	Nick Mohammed	Canada	0	3	3
11	Antonio Rosado	Mexico	0	3	3
11	Vasyl Rybalko	Soviet Union	0	3	3
11	Vladislav Sekal	Czechoslovakia	0	3	3

=== Round 2 ===
It is unclear why Leclerc was not eliminated but instead continued on to round 3.

Bouts

Winner	Nation	Victory Type	Loser	Nation
Anton Mackowiak	Germany	Decision, 3–0	Daniel Hauser	Switzerland
Per Berlin	Sweden	Fall	Arvedo Cecchini	Italy
William Smith	United States	Decision, 2–0	Nick Mohammed	Canada
Alberto Longarella	Argentina	Fall	Antonio Rosado	Mexico
Vladislav Sekal	Czechoslovakia	Fall	Jos De Jong	Belgium
Mohamed Hassan Moussa	Egypt	Fall	Cyril Martin	South Africa
Tsugio Yamazaki	Japan	Decision, 3–0	Don Irvine	Great Britain
Bev Scott	Australia	Decision, 2–1	Jean-Baptiste Leclerc	France
Abdollah Mojtabavi	Iran	Decision, 2–1	Vasyl Rybalko	Soviet Union
Aleksanteri Keisala	Finland	Decision, 2–1	Mehmet Ali Islioğlu	Turkey

Points

Rank	Wrestler	Nation	Start	Earned	Total
1	Mohamed Hassan Moussa	Egypt	0	0	0
2	Per Berlin	Sweden	1	0	1
2	Alberto Longarella	Argentina	1	0	1
2	William Smith	United States	0	1	1
5	Anton Mackowiak	Germany	1	1	2
5	Abdollah Mojtabavi	Iran	1	1	2
5	Bev Scott	Australia	1	1	2
5	Tsugio Yamazaki	Japan	1	1	2
9	Vladislav Sekal	Czechoslovakia	3	0	3
10	Mehmet Ali Islioğlu	Turkey	1	3	4
10	Aleksanteri Keisala	Finland	3	1	4
10	Cyril Martin	South Africa	1	3	4
13	Jean-Baptiste Leclerc	France	3	3	6
14	Arvedo Cecchini	Italy	3	3	6
14	Jos De Jong	Belgium	3	3	6
14	Daniel Hauser	Switzerland	3	3	6
14	Don Irvine	Great Britain	3	3	6
14	Nick Mohammed	Canada	3	3	6
14	Antonio Rosado	Mexico	3	3	6
14	Vasyl Rybalko	Soviet Union	3	3	6

=== Round 3 ===
Bouts

Winner	Nation	Victory Type	Loser	Nation
Per Berlin	Sweden	Decision, 3–0	Anton Mackowiak	Germany
William Smith	United States	Decision, 3–0	Alberto Longarella	Argentina
Vladislav Sekal	Czechoslovakia	Fall	Mohamed Hassan Moussa	Egypt
Tsugio Yamazaki	Japan	Decision, 2–1	Cyril Martin	South Africa
Mehmet Ali Islioğlu	Turkey	Decision, 3–0	Jean-Baptiste Leclerc	France
Abdollah Mojtabavi	Iran	Decision, 3–0	Bev Scott	Australia
Aleksanteri Keisala	Finland	Bye	N/A	N/A

Points

Rank	Wrestler	Nation	Start	Earned	Total
1	Per Berlin	Sweden	1	1	2
1	William Smith	United States	1	1	2
3	Abdollah Mojtabavi	Iran	2	1	3
3	Mohamed Hassan Moussa	Egypt	0	3	3
3	Vladislav Sekal	Czechoslovakia	3	0	3
3	Tsugio Yamazaki	Japan	2	1	3
7	Aleksanteri Keisala	Finland	4	0	4
7	Alberto Longarella	Argentina	1	3	4
9	Mehmet Ali Islioğlu	Turkey	4	1	5
9	Anton Mackowiak	Germany	2	3	5
9	Bev Scott	Australia	2	3	5
12	Cyril Martin	South Africa	4	3	7
13	Jean-Baptiste Leclerc	France	6	3	9

=== Round 4 ===
Bouts

Winner	Nation	Victory Type	Loser	Nation
Per Berlin	Sweden	Decision, 3–0	Aleksanteri Keisala	Finland
Alberto Longarella	Argentina	Decision, 2–1	Vladislav Sekal	Czechoslovakia
William Smith	United States	Fall	Mohamed Hassan Moussa	Egypt
Abdollah Mojtabavi	Iran	Decision, 3–0	Tsugio Yamazaki	Japan

Points

Rank	Wrestler	Nation	Start	Earned	Total
1	William Smith	United States	2	0	2
2	Per Berlin	Sweden	2	1	3
3	Abdollah Mojtabavi	Iran	3	1	4
4	Alberto Longarella	Argentina	4	1	5
5	Mohamed Hassan Moussa	Egypt	3	3	6
5	Vladislav Sekal	Czechoslovakia	3	3	6
5	Tsugio Yamazaki	Japan	3	3	6
8	Aleksanteri Keisala	Finland	4	3	7

=== Medal rounds ===
None of the medalists had faced each other, so each wrestled the other two. Each won a bout and lost a bout, so bad points were used to break the three-way 1–1 tie. Smith had won two bouts by fall and two by decision coming into the medal round, leading at 2 points. Berlin had taken only one bout by fall and three by decision before the medal round, coming in at second place with 3 points. All four of Mojtabavi's pre-medal round wins had been by decision, so he had 4 points and came in at third place. Each wrestler earned 4 points in the medal rounds (1 win by decision, 1 loss), so their rank order did not change. Smith took gold, Berlin silver, and Mojtabavi bronze.

Bouts

Winner	Nation	Victory Type	Loser	Nation
Per Berlin	Sweden	Decision, 3–0	William Smith	United States
Abdollah Mojtabavi	Iran	Decision, 3–0	Per Berlin	Sweden
William Smith	United States	Decision, 3–0	Abdollah Mojtabavi	Iran

Points

Rank	Wrestler	Nation	Start	Earned	Total
1st place, gold medalist(s)	William Smith	United States	2	4	6
2nd place, silver medalist(s)	Per Berlin	Sweden	3	4	7
3rd place, bronze medalist(s)	Abdollah Mojtabavi	Iran	4	4	8
