= Wrestling at the 1948 Summer Olympics – Men's Greco-Roman welterweight =

Wrestling at the Olympics

Men's Greco-Roman welterweight at the Games of the XIV Olympiad
- Venue: Empress Hall, Earls Court Exhibition Centre
- Dates: 3–6 August 1948
- Competitors: 16 from 16 nations

Medalists
1st place, gold medalist(s)		Gösta Andersson	Sweden
2nd place, silver medalist(s)		Miklós Szilvási	Hungary
3rd place, bronze medalist(s)		Henrik Hansen	Denmark

The men's Greco-Roman welterweight competition at the 1948 Summer Olympics in London took place from 3 August to 6 August at the Empress Hall, Earls Court Exhibition Centre. Nations were limited to one competitor. Welterweight is the fourth-heaviest category, including wrestlers weighing 67 to 73 kilograms (147.7 to 160.9 lb).

This Greco-Roman wrestling competition continued to use the "bad points" elimination system introduced at the 1928 Summer Olympics for Greco-Roman and at the 1932 Summer Olympics for freestyle wrestling, with the slight modification introduced in 1936. Each round featured all wrestlers pairing off and wrestling one bout (with one wrestler having a bye if there were an odd number). The loser received 3 points if the loss was by fall or unanimous decision and 2 points if the decision was 2-1 (this was the modification from prior years, where all losses were 3 points). The winner received 1 point if the win was by decision and 0 points if the win was by fall. At the end of each round, any wrestler with at least 5 points was eliminated.

== Results ==
=== Round 1 ===
Özdemir retired after his loss.

Bouts

Winner	Nation	Victory Type	Loser	Nation
Miklós Szilvási	Hungary	Decision, 3–0	Julien Dobbelaere	Belgium
Josef Schmidt	Austria	Fall	Andy Wilson	Great Britain
René Chesneau	France	Fall	Nic Felgen	Luxembourg
Alberto Longarella	Argentina	Decision, 2–1	Robert Diggelmann	Switzerland
Veikko Männikkö	Finland	Decision, 3–0	Ali Özdemir	Turkey
Bjørn Cook	Norway	Decision, 3–0	Luigi Rigamonti	Italy
Henrik Hansen	Denmark	Fall	Kemal Munir	Egypt
Gösta Andersson	Sweden	Fall	Johan Schouten	Netherlands

Points

Rank	Wrestler	Nation	Start	Earned	Total
1	Gösta Andersson	Sweden	0	0	0
1	René Chesneau	France	0	0	0
1	Henrik Hansen	Denmark	0	0	0
1	Josef Schmidt	Austria	0	0	0
5	Bjørn Cook	Norway	0	1	1
5	Alberto Longarella	Argentina	0	1	1
5	Veikko Männikkö	Finland	0	1	1
5	Miklós Szilvási	Hungary	0	1	1
9	Robert Diggelmann	Switzerland	0	2	2
10	Julien Dobbelaere	Belgium	0	3	3
10	Nic Felgen	Luxembourg	0	3	3
10	Kemal Munir	Egypt	0	3	3
10	Luigi Rigamonti	Italy	0	3	3
10	Johan Schouten	Netherlands	0	3	3
10	Andy Wilson	Great Britain	0	3	3
16	Ali Özdemir	Turkey	0	3	3*

=== Round 2 ===
Dobbelaere and Schouten withdrew after this round.

Bouts

Winner	Nation	Victory Type	Loser	Nation
Julien Dobbelaere	Belgium	Fall	Andy Wilson	Great Britain
Miklós Szilvási	Hungary	Decision, 3–0	Josef Schmidt	Austria
Nic Felgen	Luxembourg	Fall	Robert Diggelmann	Switzerland
Bjørn Cook	Norway	Decision, 3–0	Veikko Männikkö	Finland
René Chesneau	France	Decision, 3–0	Alberto Longarella	Argentina
Luigi Rigamonti	Italy	Fall	Kemal Munir	Egypt
Gösta Andersson	Sweden	Decision, 3–0	Henrik Hansen	Denmark
Johan Schouten	Netherlands	Bye	N/A	N/A

Points

Rank	Wrestler	Nation	Start	Earned	Total
1	Gösta Andersson	Sweden	0	1	1
1	René Chesneau	France	0	1	1
3	Bjørn Cook	Norway	1	1	2
3	Miklós Szilvási	Hungary	1	1	2
5	Nic Felgen	Luxembourg	3	0	3
5	Henrik Hansen	Denmark	0	3	3
5	Luigi Rigamonti	Italy	3	0	3
5	Josef Schmidt	Austria	0	3	3
9	Alberto Longarella	Argentina	1	3	4
9	Veikko Männikkö	Finland	1	3	4
11	Julien Dobbelaere	Belgium	3	0	3*
11	Johan Schouten	Netherlands	3	0	3*
13	Robert Diggelmann	Switzerland	2	3	5
14	Kemal Munir	Egypt	3	3	6
14	Andy Wilson	Great Britain	3	3	6

=== Round 3 ===
Bouts

Winner	Nation	Victory Type	Loser	Nation
Miklós Szilvási	Hungary	Fall	René Chesneau	France
Josef Schmidt	Austria	Decision, 3–0	Nic Felgen	Luxembourg
Veikko Männikkö	Finland	Fall	Alberto Longarella	Argentina
Henrik Hansen	Denmark	Decision, 3–0	Bjørn Cook	Norway
Gösta Andersson	Sweden	Decision, 3–0	Luigi Rigamonti	Italy

Points

Rank	Wrestler	Nation	Start	Earned	Total
1	Gösta Andersson	Sweden	1	1	2
1	Miklós Szilvási	Hungary	2	0	2
3	René Chesneau	France	1	3	4
3	Henrik Hansen	Denmark	3	1	4
3	Veikko Männikkö	Finland	4	0	4
3	Josef Schmidt	Austria	3	1	4
7	Bjørn Cook	Norway	2	3	5
8	Nic Felgen	Luxembourg	3	3	6
8	Luigi Rigamonti	Italy	3	3	6
10	Alberto Longarella	Argentina	4	3	7

=== Round 4 ===
Bouts

Winner	Nation	Victory Type	Loser	Nation
Miklós Szilvási	Hungary	Decision, 3–0	Veikko Männikkö	Finland
Henrik Hansen	Denmark	Fall	Josef Schmidt	Austria
Gösta Andersson	Sweden	Decision, 3–0	René Chesneau	France

Points

Rank	Wrestler	Nation	Start	Earned	Total
1	Gösta Andersson	Sweden	2	1	3
1	Miklós Szilvási	Hungary	2	1	3
3	Henrik Hansen	Denmark	4	0	4
4	René Chesneau	France	4	3	7
4	Veikko Männikkö	Finland	4	3	7
4	Josef Schmidt	Austria	4	3	7

=== Round 5 ===
Bouts

Winner	Nation	Victory Type	Loser	Nation
Miklós Szilvási	Hungary	Fall	Henrik Hansen	Denmark
Gösta Andersson	Sweden	Bye	N/A	N/A

Points

Rank	Wrestler	Nation	Start	Earned	Total
1	Gösta Andersson	Sweden	3	0	3
1	Miklós Szilvási	Hungary	3	0	3
3rd place, bronze medalist(s)	Henrik Hansen	Denmark	4	3	7

=== Round 6 ===
Bouts

Winner	Nation	Victory Type	Loser	Nation
Gösta Andersson	Sweden	Decision, 3–0	Miklós Szilvási	Hungary

Points

Rank	Wrestler	Nation	Start	Earned	Total
1st place, gold medalist(s)	Gösta Andersson	Sweden	3	1	4
2nd place, silver medalist(s)	Miklós Szilvási	Hungary	3	3	6
