= Wrestling at the 1952 Summer Olympics – Men's freestyle flyweight =

Wrestling at the Olympics

Men's freestyle flyweight at the Games of the XV Olympiad
- Venue: Messuhalli
- Dates: 20–23 July 1952
- Competitors: 16 from 16 nations

Medalists
1st place, gold medalist(s)		Hasan Gemici	Turkey
2nd place, silver medalist(s)		Yushu Kitano	Japan
3rd place, bronze medalist(s)		Mahmoud Mollaghasemi	Iran

The men's freestyle flyweight competition at the 1952 Summer Olympics in Helsinki took place from 20 July to 23 July at Messuhalli. Nations were limited to one competitor. Flyweight was the lightest category, including wrestlers weighing up to 52 kilograms (114.6 lb).

== Competition format ==
This freestyle wrestling competition continued to use the "bad points" elimination system introduced at the 1928 Summer Olympics for Greco-Roman and at the 1932 Summer Olympics for freestyle wrestling, removing the slight modification introduced in 1936 and used until 1948 (which had a reduced penalty for a loss by 2–1 decision). Each round featured all wrestlers pairing off and wrestling one bout (with one wrestler having a bye if there were an odd number). The loser received 3 points. The winner received 1 point if the win was by decision and 0 points if the win was by fall. At the end of each round, any wrestler with at least 5 points was eliminated. This elimination continued until the medal rounds, which began when 3 wrestlers remained. These 3 wrestlers each faced each other in a round-robin medal round (with earlier results counting, if any had wrestled another before); record within the medal round determined medals, with bad points breaking ties.

== Results ==
=== Round 1 ===
Timonen withdrew after his bout.

Bouts

Winner	Nation	Victory Type	Loser	Nation
Yushu Kitano	Japan	Decision, 3–0	Rolf Johansson	Sweden
Hugh Peery	United States	Decision, 3–0	Mohamed Abdel Hamid El-Ward	Egypt
Georgy Sayadov	Soviet Union	Decision, 3–0	Marcel Sigiran	France
Giordano De Giorgi	Italy	Decision, 3–0	Maurice Mewis	Belgium
Hasan Gemici	Turkey	Decision, 3–0	Oiva Timonen	Finland
Heini Weber	Germany	Fall	Leslie Cheetham	Great Britain
Mahmoud Mollaghasemi	Iran	Fall	Niranjan Das	India
Louis Baise	South Africa	Decision, 3–0	Rodolfo Dávila	Mexico

Points

Rank	Wrestler	Nation	Start	Earned	Total
1	Mahmoud Mollaghasemi	Iran	0	0	0
1	Heini Weber	Germany	0	0	0
3	Louis Baise	South Africa	0	1	1
3	Giordano De Giorgi	Italy	0	1	1
3	Hasan Gemici	Turkey	0	1	1
3	Yushu Kitano	Japan	0	1	1
3	Hugh Peery	United States	0	1	1
3	Georgy Sayadov	Soviet Union	0	1	1
9	Leslie Cheetham	Great Britain	0	3	3
9	Niranjan Das	India	0	3	3
9	Rodolfo Dávila	Mexico	0	3	3
9	Mohamed Abdel Hamid El-Ward	Egypt	0	3	3
9	Rolf Johansson	Sweden	0	3	3
9	Maurice Mewis	Belgium	0	3	3
9	Marcel Sigiran	France	0	3	3
16	Oiva Timonen	Finland	0	3	3*

=== Round 2 ===
Bouts

Winner	Nation	Victory Type	Loser	Nation
Yushu Kitano	Japan	Fall	Mohamed Abdel Hamid El-Ward	Egypt
Hugh Peery	United States	Decision, 3–0	Rolf Johansson	Sweden
Georgy Sayadov	Soviet Union	Decision, 3–0	Maurice Mewis	Belgium
Giordano De Giorgi	Italy	Decision, 3–0	Marcel Sigiran	France
Hasan Gemici	Turkey	Fall	Leslie Cheetham	Great Britain
Heini Weber	Germany	Fall	Niranjan Das	India
Mahmoud Mollaghasemi	Iran	Fall	Louis Baise	South Africa
Rodolfo Dávila	Mexico	Bye	N/A	N/A

Points

Rank	Wrestler	Nation	Start	Earned	Total
1	Mahmoud Mollaghasemi	Iran	0	0	0
1	Heini Weber	Germany	0	0	0
3	Hasan Gemici	Turkey	1	0	1
3	Yushu Kitano	Japan	1	0	1
5	Giordano De Giorgi	Italy	1	1	2
5	Hugh Peery	United States	1	1	2
5	Georgy Sayadov	Soviet Union	1	1	2
8	Rodolfo Dávila	Mexico	3	0	3
9	Louis Baise	South Africa	1	3	4
10	Leslie Cheetham	Great Britain	3	3	6
10	Niranjan Das	India	3	3	6
10	Mohamed Abdel Hamid El-Ward	Egypt	3	3	6
10	Maurice Mewis	Belgium	3	3	6
10	Rolf Johansson	Sweden	3	3	6
10	Marcel Sigiran	France	3	3	6

=== Round 3 ===
Bouts

Winner	Nation	Victory Type	Loser	Nation
Yushu Kitano	Japan	Fall	Rodolfo Dávila	Mexico
Georgy Sayadov	Soviet Union	Decision, 3–0	Hugh Peery	United States
Hasan Gemici	Turkey	Fall	Giordano De Giorgi	Italy
Mahmoud Mollaghasemi	Iran	Decision, 3–0	Heini Weber	Germany
Louis Baise	South Africa	Bye	N/A	N/A

Points

Rank	Wrestler	Nation	Start	Earned	Total
1	Hasan Gemici	Turkey	1	0	1
1	Yushu Kitano	Japan	1	0	1
1	Mahmoud Mollaghasemi	Iran	0	1	1
4	Georgy Sayadov	Soviet Union	2	1	3
4	Heini Weber	Germany	0	3	3
6	Louis Baise	South Africa	4	0	4
7	Giordano De Giorgi	Italy	2	3	5
7	Hugh Peery	United States	2	3	5
9	Rodolfo Dávila	Mexico	3	3	6

=== Round 4 ===
Bouts

Winner	Nation	Victory Type	Loser	Nation
Yushu Kitano	Japan	Fall	Louis Baise	South Africa
Georgy Sayadov	Soviet Union	Decision, 3–0	Heini Weber	Germany
Mahmoud Mollaghasemi	Iran	Decision, 2–1	Hasan Gemici	Turkey

Points

Rank	Wrestler	Nation	Start	Earned	Total
1	Yushu Kitano	Japan	1	0	1
2	Mahmoud Mollaghasemi	Iran	1	1	2
3	Hasan Gemici	Turkey	1	3	4
3	Georgy Sayadov	Soviet Union	3	1	4
5	Heini Weber	Germany	3	3	6
6	Louis Baise	South Africa	4	3	7

=== Round 5 ===
Bouts

Winner	Nation	Victory Type	Loser	Nation
Hasan Gemici	Turkey	Decision, 3–0	Yushu Kitano	Japan
Mahmoud Mollaghasemi	Iran	Decision, 2–1	Georgy Sayadov	Soviet Union

Points

Rank	Wrestler	Nation	Start	Earned	Total
1	Mahmoud Mollaghasemi	Iran	2	1	3
2	Yushu Kitano	Japan	1	3	4
3	Hasan Gemici	Turkey	4	1	5
4	Georgy Sayadov	Soviet Union	4	3	7

=== Medal rounds ===
Gemici's victory over Kitano in round 4 and Mollaghasemi's victory over Gemici counted for the medal round. Kitano defeated Mollaghasemi in the medal round, leaving each wrestler at a record of 1–1 against the other medalists. Bad points were used to break this tie, leaving Mollaghasemi with the bronze medal but Gemici and Kitano still tied. Head-to-head results were the next tie-breaker, with Gemici taking the gold medal due to his round 4 win.

Bouts

Winner	Nation	Victory Type	Loser	Nation
Yushu Kitano	Japan	Decision, 3–0	Mahmoud Mollaghasemi	Iran

Points

Rank	Wrestler	Nation	Wins	Losses	Start	Earned	Total
1st place, gold medalist(s)	Hasan Gemici	Turkey	1	1	5	0	5
2nd place, silver medalist(s)	Yushu Kitano	Japan	1	1	4	1	5
3rd place, bronze medalist(s)	Mahmoud Mollaghasemi	Iran	1	1	3	3	7
