= Marushkin =

Marushkin (masculine, Russian: Марушкин) or Marushkina (feminine, Russian: Марушкина) is a Russian surname. Notable people with the surname include:

- Semyon Marushkin (1919–1993), Russian wrestler
- Yuri Marushkin (1944–2015), Russian soccer player and manager
