= Hugh Peery =

American wrestler (1931–2015)

Personal information
- Full name: Robert Hugh Peery
- Born: November 7, 1931 Stillwater, Oklahoma, U.S.
- Died: January 10, 2015 (aged 83) Pittsburgh, Pennsylvania, U.S.

Sport
- Country: United States
- Sport: Wrestling
- Events: Freestyle and Folkstyle
- College team: Pittsburgh
- Team: USA
Medal record
Collegiate Wrestling
Representing the Pittsburgh Panthers
NCAA Championships
Gold medal – first place	1952 Fort Collins	115 lb
Gold medal – first place	1953 State College	115 lb
Gold medal – first place	1954 Norman	115 lb

Robert Hugh Peery (November 7, 1931 – January 10, 2015) was an American wrestler. He won a gold medal at the 1951 Pan American Games, and he competed in the men's freestyle flyweight at the 1952 Summer Olympics. He also worked as a dentist for more than 50 years.

== Biography ==
Peery was born in Stillwater, Oklahoma in 1931. He attended the Tulsa Central High School, where he became an Eagle Scout and a two-time state champion. At the University of Pittsburgh he was a three-time NCAA champion in the early 1950s. At the 1951 Pan American Games, Peery won the gold medal in the freestyle flyweight division.

Peery was selected to represent the United States at the 1952 Summer Olympics in Helsinki. At the Olympics, Peery competed in the men's freestyle flyweight event, and was eliminated by Georgy Sayadov of the Soviet Union.

Following his wrestling career, Peery graduated from a dental school in 1956, going on to serve in the United States Navy Dental Corps. Following his military career, he returned to Pittsburgh, where he worked as a dentist for more than 50 years.

In 1980, he was inducted into the National Wrestling Hall of Fame as a Distinguished Member, and he was also posthumously inducted into the University of Pittsburgh hall of fame. His brother, Ed, and his father, Rex, were also inducted into the National Wrestling Hall of Fame.
