= Robert Diggelmann =

Swiss wrestler (1924–2018)

Personal information
- Nationality: Swiss
- Born: 20 January 1924
- Died: 7 January 2018 (aged 93)

Sport
- Sport: Wrestling

Robert Diggelmann (20 January 1924 – 7 January 2018) was a Swiss wrestler. He competed in the men's Greco-Roman welterweight at the 1948 Summer Olympics.
