= Håkon Olsen =

Norwegian wrestler

Personal information
- Nationality: Norwegian
- Born: 22 March 1927 Notodden, Norway
- Died: 15 September 1992 (aged 65) Notodden, Norway

Sport
- Sport: Wrestling

Håkon Olsen (22 March 1927 – 15 September 1992) was a Norwegian wrestler. He competed in the men's Greco-Roman welterweight at the 1952 Summer Olympics.
