= Antoni Gołaś =

Polish wrestler

Personal information
- Born: 29 December 1919 Bartoszewice, Poland
- Died: 18 July 2003 (aged 83) Katowice, Poland

Sport
- Sport: Wrestling

Antoni Gołaś (29 December 1919 – 18 July 2003) was a Polish wrestler. He competed in the men's Greco-Roman welterweight at the 1952 Summer Olympics.
