= Osvaldo Riva =

Italian wrestler

Personal information
- Nationality: Italian
- Born: 3 November 1927 Genoa, Italy
- Died: 14 April 2004 (aged 76)

Sport
- Sport: Wrestling

Osvaldo Riva (3 November 1927 – 14 April 2004) was an Italian wrestler. He competed in the men's Greco-Roman welterweight at the 1952 Summer Olympics.
