= Giordano De Giorgi =

Italian wrestler

Personal information
- Nationality: Italian
- Born: 15 February 1919 Canzano, Italy
- Died: 27 February 1996 (aged 77) Trieste, Italy

Sport
- Sport: Wrestling

Giordano De Giorgi (15 February 1919 – 27 February 1996) was an Italian wrestler. He competed in the men's freestyle flyweight at the 1952 Summer Olympics.
