= Antonio Rosado =

Mexican wrestler (1931–2025)

Personal information
- Full name: Antonio Rosado García
- Born: 9 March 1931 Mexico City, Mexico
- Died: 25 May 2025 (aged 94)

Sport
- Sport: Wrestling

Antonio Rosado García (9 March 1931 – 25 May 2025) was a Mexican wrestler. He competed in the men's freestyle welterweight at the 1952 Summer Olympics. Rosado died on 25 May 2025, at the age of 94.
