= Julien Dobbelaere =

Belgian wrestler

Personal information
- Nationality: Belgian
- Born: 22 February 1921 Ghent, Belgium

Sport
- Sport: Wrestling

Julien Dobbelaere (22 February 1921 – 19 August 1961) was a Belgian wrestler. He competed in the men's Greco-Roman welterweight at the 1948 Summer Olympics.
