= Khalil Taha =

Lebanese wrestler (1932–2020)

Medal record

Men's Greco-Roman wrestling

Representing Lebanon

Olympic Games
Bronze medal – third place	1952 Helsinki	Welterweight

Khalil Taha (13 July 1932 – 27 July 2020) was a Lebanese wrestler. He was born in Beirut.

At the 1951 Mediterranean Games in Alexandria Egypt, Taha won the silver medal in the 73 kg Greco-Roman wrestling.

At the 1952 Summer Olympics, he won the bronze medal in the men's Greco-Roman Welterweight category.

He died in Venice, U.S., on 27 July 2020, aged 88.
