= Leslie Cheetham =

British wrestler

Personal information
- Nationality: British
- Born: 8 October 1925 Bolton, England
- Died: May 1998 Bolton, England

Sport
- Sport: Wrestling

Leslie Cheetham (8 October 1925 – May 1998) was a British wrestler. He competed in the men's freestyle flyweight at the 1952 Summer Olympics.
