= Andy Wilson (wrestler) =

British wrestler

Personal information
- Nationality: British
- Born: 3 July 1916
- Died: 30 July 1979 (aged 63)

Sport
- Sport: Wrestling

John Andrew Wilson (3 July 1916 – 30 July 1979) was a British wrestler. He competed in the men's Greco-Roman welterweight at the 1948 Summer Olympics.
