= Marin Belușica =

Romanian wrestler

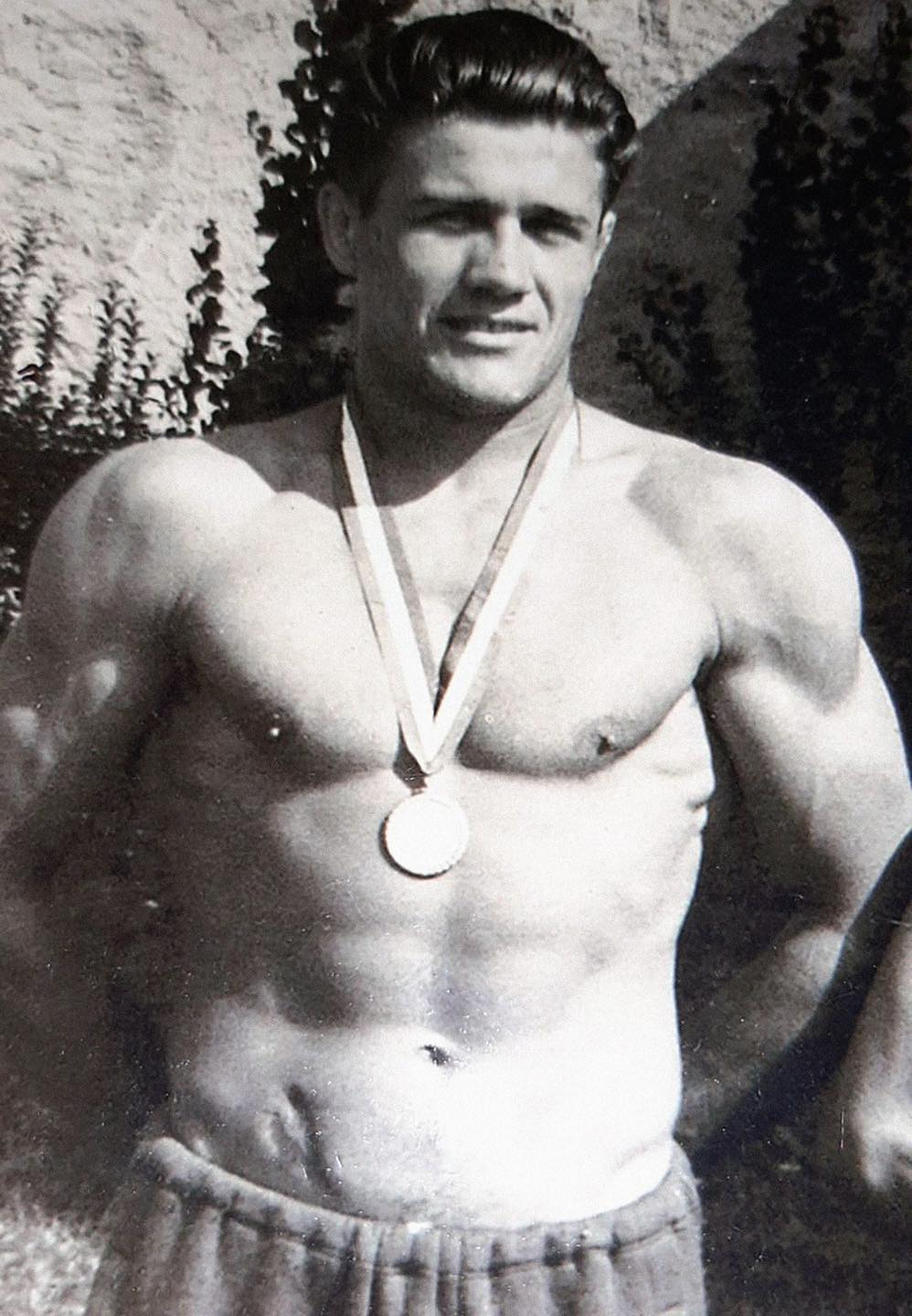

Personal information
- Nationality: Romanian
- Born: 7 October 1928 Ploiești, Romania
- Died: 13 December 2013 (aged 85)

Sport
- Sport: Wrestling

Marin Belușica (7 October 1928 – 13 December 2013) was a Romanian wrestler. He competed in the men's Greco-Roman welterweight at the 1952 Summer Olympics.
