= Daniel Hauser (wrestler) =

Swiss wrestler (1930–1969)

Personal information
- Nationality: Swiss
- Born: 1930
- Died: 21 January 1969 (aged 38–39) Chêne-Bourg, Canton of Geneva, Switzerland

Sport
- Sport: Wrestling

Daniel Hauser (1930 – 21 January 1969) was a Swiss wrestler. He competed in the men's freestyle welterweight at the 1952 Summer Olympics. Hauser died in Chêne-Bourg, Canton of Geneva on 21 January 1969.
