= Cyril Martin (wrestler) =

South African wrestler

Personal information
- Nationality: South African
- Born: 13 September 1928
- Died: 29 September 2007 (aged 79) Cape Town, South Africa

Sport
- Sport: Wrestling

Cyril Martin (13 September 1928 – 29 September 2007) was a South African wrestler. He competed in the men's freestyle welterweight at the 1952 Summer Olympics.
