= Miklós Szilvásy =

Hungarian Greco-Roman wrestler

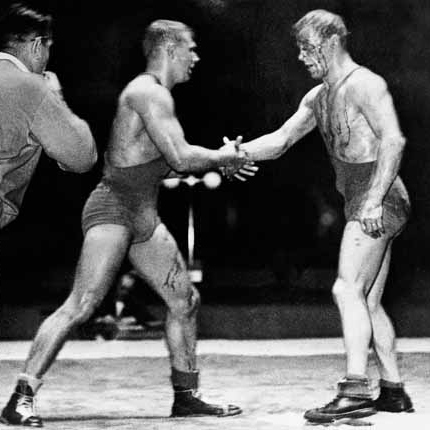
- Szilvásy (left) vs Andersson at the 1948 Olympics

Personal information
- Born: 5 December 1925 Márianosztra, Hungary
- Died: 24 May 1969 (aged 43) Budapest, Hungary

Sport
- Sport: Greco-Roman wrestling
- Club: Ferencvárosi Torna Club; Budapesti Kinizsi; Budapesti Dózsa
Medal record
Men's Greco-Roman wrestling
Representing Hungary
Olympic Games
Gold medal – first place	1952 Helsinki	73 kg
Silver medal – second place	1948 London	73 kg
World Championships
Silver medal – second place	1953 Naples	73 kg

Miklós Szilvásy (sometimes spelled Szilvási, 5 December 1925 – 24 May 1969) was a Hungarian welterweight Greco-Roman wrestler. He competed at the 1948, 1952 and 1956 Summer Olympics and won a silver medal in 1948 and a gold in 1952. He lost the 1948 final to Gösta Andersson, but avenged the loss in the 1952 final.
