= Luigi Rigamonti =

Italian wrestler

Personal information
- Nationality: Italian
- Born: 7 April 1920
- Died: 15 July 1990 (aged 70)

Sport
- Sport: Wrestling

Luigi Rigamonti (7 April 1920 – 15 July 1990) was an Italian wrestler. He competed in the men's Greco-Roman welterweight at the 1948 Summer Olympics.
