= Nic Felgen =

Luxembourgish wrestler

Personal information
- Nationality: Luxembourgish
- Born: 13 September 1920 Niederkorn, Luxembourg
- Died: 21 April 1972 (aged 51) Rodange, Luxembourg

Sport
- Sport: Wrestling

Nic Felgen (13 September 1920 – 21 April 1972) was a Luxembourgish wrestler. He competed in the men's Greco-Roman welterweight at the 1948 Summer Olympics.
