= Nick Mohammed (wrestler) =

Canadian wrestler

Nick (Niaz) Mohammed
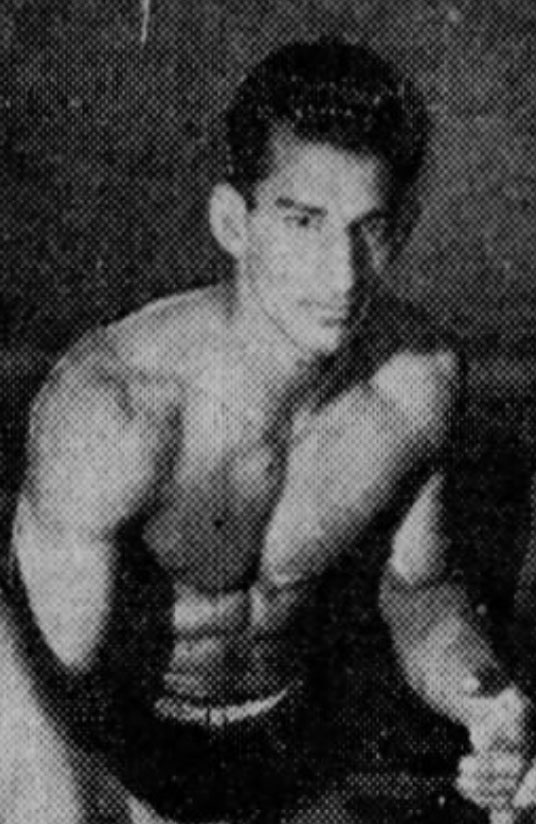
- Mohammed in 1947

Personal information
- Nationality: Canadian
- Born: 29 January 1926 India
- Died: 11 March 2011 (aged 85) Burnaby, British Columbia, Canada

Sport
- Sport: Wrestling

Nick Mohammed (29 January 1926 – 11 March 2011) was a Canadian wrestler. He competed in the men's freestyle welterweight at the 1952 Summer Olympics.
