= Gottfried Anglberger =

Austrian wrestler

Personal information
- Nationality: Austrian
- Born: 26 October 1930
- Died: 8 October 2015 (aged 84)

Sport
- Sport: Wrestling

Gottfried Anglberger (26 October 1930 – 8 October 2015) was an Austrian wrestler. He competed in the men's Greco-Roman welterweight at the 1952 Summer Olympics.
