= Kemal Munir =

Egyptian wrestler

Personal information
- Nationality: Egyptian
- Born: Cairo, Egypt

Sport
- Sport: Wrestling

Kemal Munir was an Egyptian wrestler. He competed in the men's Greco-Roman welterweight at the 1948 Summer Olympics.
