= Mehmet Ali Islioğlu =

Turkish wrestler

Personal information
- Nationality: Turkish
- Born: 1926 (age 99–100)

Sport
- Sport: Wrestling

Mehmet Ali Islioğlu (born 1926) was a Turkish wrestler. He competed in the men's freestyle welterweight at the 1952 Summer Olympics.
