= Rodolfo Dávila =

Mexican wrestler (1929 – 2002)

Personal information
- Born: 10 May 1929 Saltillo, Mexico
- Died: 31 October 2002 (aged 73)

Sport
- Sport: Wrestling

Rodolfo Dávila (10 May 1929 – 31 October 2002) was a Mexican wrestler. He competed in the men's freestyle flyweight at the 1952 Summer Olympics.
