= Arvedo Cecchini =

Italian wrestler

Personal information
- Nationality: Italian
- Born: 2 December 1924 Rome, Italy
- Died: 22 August 2011 (aged 86) Rome, Italy

Sport
- Sport: Wrestling

Arvedo Cecchini (2 December 1924 – 22 August 2011) was an Italian wrestler. He competed in the men's freestyle welterweight at the 1952 Summer Olympics.
