= Johan Schouten =

Dutch wrestler

Personal information
- Nationality: Dutch
- Born: 4 October 1910 Amsterdam, Netherlands
- Died: 11 May 1989 (aged 78) Lelystad, Netherlands

Sport
- Sport: Wrestling

Johan Schouten (4 October 1910 – 11 May 1989) was a Dutch wrestler. He competed in the men's Greco-Roman welterweight at the 1948 Summer Olympics.
