= Oiva Timonen =

Finnish wrestler (1920–1998)

Personal information
- Nationality: Finnish
- Born: 26 May 1920 Evijärvi, Finland
- Died: 31 October 1998 (aged 78) Nurmo, Finland

Sport
- Sport: Wrestling

Oiva Timonen (26 May 1920 – 31 October 1998) was a Finnish wrestler. He competed in the men's freestyle flyweight at the 1952 Summer Olympics.
