= Odd Øyen =

Norwegian resistance member (1914–1997)

- Born: 8 September 1914; Oslo
- Died: 3 January 1997 (aged 82); Bærum Municipality
- Burial place: Stor-Elvdal Municipality
- Military career
- Allegiance: Norway
- Branch: Norwegian resistance movement Royal Norwegian Navy
- Service years: 1940–1945
- Unit: Milorg's District 13
- Conflicts: Battle of Midtskogen, Østerdalen
- Awards: St. Olav's Medal With Oak Branch, Royal Norwegian Order of St. Olav, Swedish Order of Vasa
- Other work: Medicine, anaesthesiology

Odd Toralf Øyen (8 September 1914 – 3 January 1997) was a Norwegian resistance member and anaesthesiological physician.

== Early life and World War II ==
He was born in Oslo as a son of Lieutenant Colonel Toralf Øyen (1878–1963) and Elia Haugros (1876–1951). He took his examen artium at Riis in 1934. He enrolled in medicine studies in 1936, but his studies were interrupted by World War II. He participated in the Battle of Midtskogen on 10 April 1940, one day after Germany invaded Norway. He had finished basic officer training in 1936, and holding the rank of Second Lieutenant in 1940 he continued to participate in battles north of Midtskogen, in Østerdalen. Norway soon lost the battle phase of the Norwegian–German conflict, though, and entered a phase of occupation and secret resistance work.

In February 1944 Øyen became leader of weapons supply and stock of Milorg's District 13, the district covering Norway's capital district. The position was created by Oliver H. Langeland after some of the men handling weapon smuggling had been caught, most recently Mikael Hovhaugholen. Øyen's nom de guerre was "Gamle-Erik", a euphemism for Satan. His doublés were Olav Selvaag and Hans Heyerdahl. Selvaag was asked to become weapons leader originally, and took over on 9 April 1945 when Øyen established a paramilitary base in Nordmarka. Bror With had also been asked, by Jens Christian Hauge in 1943, but he rejected and instead volunteered to become a weapons manufacturer. He became best known for producing a hand grenade, but also mass-produced sten guns. All of this was highly illegal on Norwegian soil, and Øyen sometimes handled the weapons transport from production in Oslo to a testing site in Lommedalen. The weapons drops and manufacture grew in importance from September 1944, when Milorg started its sabotage group Aks 13000.

Øyen came close to being arrested on several occasions. In the summer of 1944, he was almost stopped in a German road control when transporting stenguns in a truck together with Asbjørn Pedersen and Bjørn Nicolaissen. In early 1945 Øyen spent the night at one of Milorg's secret offices, in the street Odins gate. The location had been unknowingly revealed when a random errand boy spotted a hidden weapon there and his friend about it in the presence of others. The office was raided by Gestapo the night Øyen slept there; he left before the raid after receiving a phone call from an unknown caller at 0230hrs. After the war, when Øyen spoke to newly imprisoned ex-Kriminalrat Siegfried Fehmer, Fehmer remarked dryly that "it was a pity I did not meet you earlier".

== Post-war life and career ==
Øyen met his future wife while doing resistance work. At first they did not know each other's names, only noms de guerre. He was married to Dagny Udberg (1916–1991) from February 1951.

He resumed his medicine studies after the war and graduated in 1946. He was hired in the surgical department of Lillehammer Hospital in 1947. From 1948 to 1950 he worked in the anaesthesiological department at Rikshospitalet from 1948 to 1950 and as chief physician and head of the anaesthesiological department at Aker Hospital from 1951 to 1984. He was also a consultant for the Norwegian Armed Forces Medical Corps and lectured in disaster medicine at the University of Oslo. He spent some time working abroad, notably in a field hospital from 1951 to 1952 during the Korean War, as leader of the Norwegian sanitary company stationed in Suez from 1956 to 1957 after the Suez Crisis, and as sanitary leader for United Nations Operation in the Congo (intervening in the Congo Crisis, Katanga) in 1961. He was injured in Katanga in September 1961. He also served on an earthquake team in Turkey and in Jordan and Biafra.

Øyen chaired Norsk anestesiologisk forening from 1958 to 1963. In 1972 he started an interest group called "Fritt Norge med NATO". In 1991 he was among 28 war veterans who in a petition warned the government to not sign an international convention that abolished the death penalty in times of war. Other petitioners were Tore Gjelsvik, Oskar Hasselknippe, Jens Chr. Hauge, Håkon Kyllingmark, Bjørn Rørholt, Elisabeth Schweigaard Selmer, Tor Skjønsberg, Anne-Sofie Strømnæs, Gunnar Sønsteby and Reidar Torp.

He was decorated with the Defence Medal 1940–1945, St. Olav's Medal With Oak Branch, Knight 1st Class of the Royal Norwegian Order of St. Olav (1962) and Knight 1st class of the Swedish Order of Vasa. He received the Order of Vasa for his actions in the Congo, reportedly the first non-Swedish citizen in about 150 years to receive the Order for actions in a military conflict. He died in January 1997 in Bærum Municipality, and was buried in Stor-Elvdal Municipality.
