= Mohamed Ahmed Osman =

Egyptian wrestler (born 1920)

Personal information
- Nationality: Egyptian
- Born: 10 July 1920 Alexandria, Egypt

Sport
- Sport: Wrestling

Mohamed Ahmed Osman (born 10 July 1920) was an Egyptian wrestler. He competed at the 1948 Summer Olympics and the 1952 Summer Olympics.
