= Per Berlin =

Swedish wrestler (1921–2011)

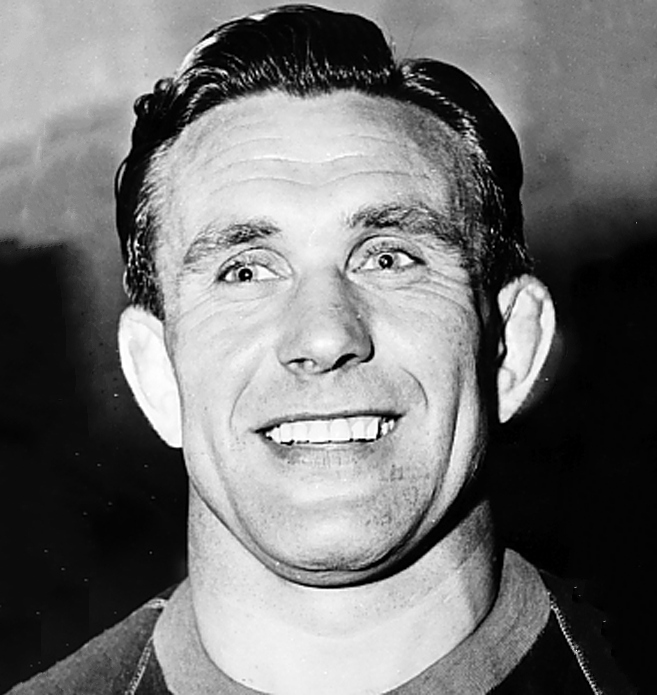

Personal information
- Full name: Per Gunnar Börje Berlin
- Born: 1 August 1921 Södra Sandby, Sweden
- Died: 22 December 2011 (aged 90) Landskrona, Sweden

Sport
- Sport: Wrestling
- Club: Eskilstuna GAK, Champigny-sur-Marne
Medal record
Representing Sweden
Olympic Games
Silver medal – second place	1952 Helsinki	Freestyle 73 kg
Bronze medal – third place	1956 Melbourne	Greco-Roman 73 kg
European Championships
Bronze medal – third place	1949 Istanbul	Freestyle 73 kg

Per Gunnar Börje Berlin (1 August 1921 – 22 December 2011) was a Swedish wrestler who competed in the 73 kg freestyle and Greco-Roman categories. He won a freestyle silver medal at the 1952 Summer Olympics and a Greco-Roman bronze in 1956. He received another bronze medal at the 1949 European Championships, and three times finished fourth in freestyle wrestling: at the 1951 and 1954 world championships and at the 1956 Olympics.
