= Hasan Gemici =

Turkish wrestler (1927–2001)

Medal record

Men's Freestyle Wrestling

Representing Turkey

Olympic Games
Gold medal – first place	1952 Helsinki	52 kg

Mediterranean Games
Gold medal – first place	1951 Alexandria	52 kg

Hasan Gemici (15 June 1927 – 25 June 2001) was a Turkish sports wrestler and trainer, who won the gold medal in the flyweight class of men's freestyle wrestling at the 1952 Olympics.

He was born in Giresun and died in İzmit, Kocaeli Province of Turkey.

Gemici began wrestling 1949 in İzmit (Kocaeli). He won the gold medal at the 1951 Mediterranean Games in Alexandria, Egypt, before he became Olympic gold medalist in Helsinki, Finland the next year. After retiring from the active sports in 1955, he served as a trainer in his hometown İzmit and later in Romania.

Hasan Gemici died on 25 June 2001 at his home in Izmit following chronic renal failure. He was succeeded by his wife Nezahat Gemici and five children. A sports hall in İzmit is named after him.

== Achievements ==
- 1951 Mediterranean Games in Alexandria, Egypt - gold (Freestyle Flyweight)
- 1952 Summer Olympics in Helsinki, Finland - gold (Freestyle Flyweight)
