= Mohamed Hassan Moussa =

Egyptian wrestler

Personal information
- Nationality: Egyptian
- Born: 27 December 1921 Alexandria, Egypt

Sport
- Sport: Wrestling

Mohamed Hassan Moussa (Arabic: مُحَمَّد حَسَن مُوسَى; born 27 December 1921) was an Egyptian wrestler. He competed at the 1948 Summer Olympics and the 1952 Summer Olympics.
