= George Kanngieser =

Australian rules footballer, born 1912

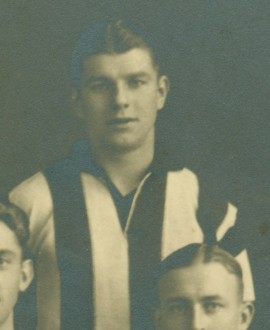
- Kanngieser in 1935

Personal information
- Full name: George Frederick Kanngieser
- Born: 27 February 1912; Collingwood, Victoria
- Died: 27 January 1997 (aged 84)
- Original team: Brunswick
- Height: 180 cm (5 ft 11 in)
- Weight: 76 kg (168 lb)

Playing career^{1}
| Years | Club | Games (Goals) |
| 1935 | Collingwood | 1 (0) |
- ^{1} Playing statistics correct to the end of 1935.

George Frederick Kanngieser (27 February 1912 – 27 January 1997) was an Australian rules footballer who played with Collingwood in the Victorian Football League (VFL).

== Family ==
The son of Jonathan Anthony Kanngieser (1877-1952), and Emily Letitia Kanngieser (1880-1916), née Trinnear, George Frederick Kanngieser was born in Collingwood on 27 February 1912. He married Mary Lorrane Cario Bennet in 1937.

== Football ==
Promoted from the Collingwood Second XVIII, he played his only First XVIII match for Collingwood on 24 August 1935, against Melbourne. Selected in the first ruck, in a drawn match — Collingwood 11.13 (79) to Melbourne's 10.19 (79) — "Kanngieser, for a newcomer, showed promise".

He was cleared from Collingwood to Brunswick Football Club, in the Victorian Football Association (VFA) in 1937. He played fifteen games there for two years, selected as an emergency for Brunswick in the 1938 grand final, but was not part of the premiership team.

Kanngieser was cleared from Brunswick to Preston Football Club, also in the VFA, in 1939, where he played two games.
