= Herman V. Wall =

American photographer

- Born: April 21, 1905; Milwaukee, Wisconsin, U.S.
- Died: January 13, 1997 (aged 91); Los Angeles, California, U.S.
- Burial place: Riverside National Cemetery
- Military career
- Allegiance: United States
- Branch: United States Army
- Service years: 1944–1945
- Rank: Major
- Unit: 165th Signal Photo Company
- Conflicts: World War II; D-Day
- Awards: Legion of Merit; Purple Heart (3)
- Other work: Photographer; Photographic Illustrator
- Website: Herman V. Wall

Herman V. Wall (April 21, 1905 – January 13, 1997) was an American World War II combat photographer and photographic illustrator. During the June 6, 1944 D-Day landings in Normandy, France, Captain Wall was commanding officer of the United States Army's 165th Signal Photo Company. Of the conspicuous heroism Wall displayed to provide much of the Army's initial photographic intelligence in the Omaha Beach landing sector, General Dwight D. Eisenhower (Supreme Commander of Allied forces in the European Theater of Operations) wrote "...a salute to a man whose gallantry, on D-Day, was outstanding on a field when gallantry was the rule."

During the pre- and post-World War II periods, Wall was a well-known freelance photographic illustrator and a late member of "Camera Pictorialists of Los Angeles." His photographs covered six decades, and could be found in international photo salons and well-known magazines such as Time and Life. Notable among his associates were Charles Kerlee and Trevor Goodman.

== Early life ==
Wall was born the third of five children to Dorly Wall (née Burkhardt) and Wilhelm Wall. He grew up in Milwaukee, Wisconsin as a 1st generation German, alongside his four siblings: Arnold, Dorly, William, and Irma. From a young age, Wall had a propensity for the outdoors; he was especially interested in hunting and fishing. Wall attended Washington High School and played the trumpet in the marching band. In the 1926, he moved to Los Angeles with his family, where he worked at the Hollywood YMCA handing out towels and locker keys.

His first venture into the world of photography came when he sold pictures of the local basketball team for 25 cents each. Wall then ensued upon a formal study of photography at the Art Center School (now called the Art Center College of Design), paying his own way. He learned from the likes of Albert King, Fred Archer, Will Connell, and Edward Kaminski and studied alongside Wynn Bullock. Wall returned as an instructor before and after World War II.

== Pre-war photography ==
Many have called Wall's photography dynamic. Early on, Wall became an assistant and partner to Charles Kerlee (who would later join Captain Edward Steichen’s unit of the Navy Air Force as lieutenant commander), a renowned commercial photographer and photographic illustrator. Wall himself developed his reputation as a photographic illustrator during the “Golden Age of Photography” –with mini-cams and communication via satellite technology still decades in the future.

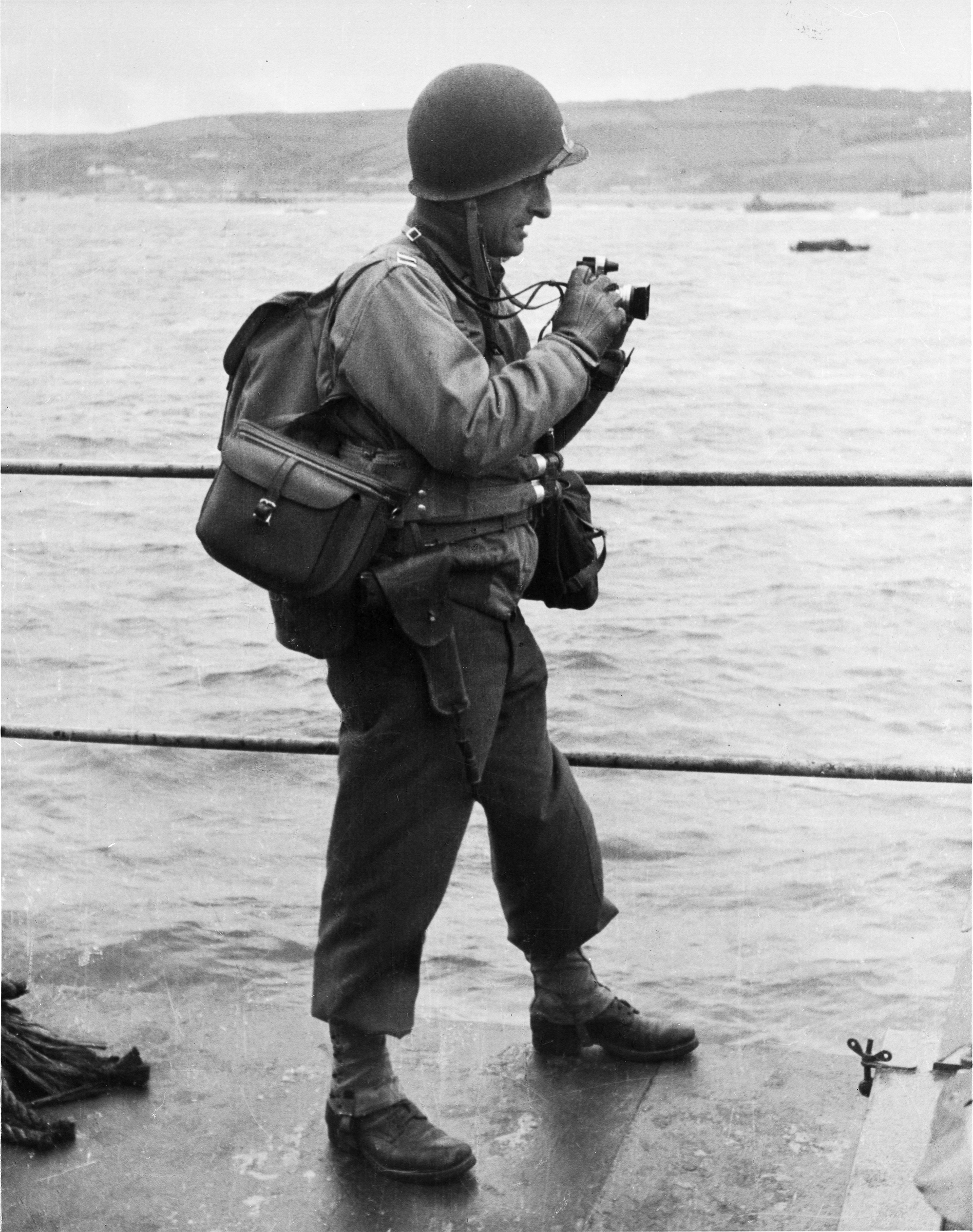
Wall on the landing craft, approaching Omaha Beach

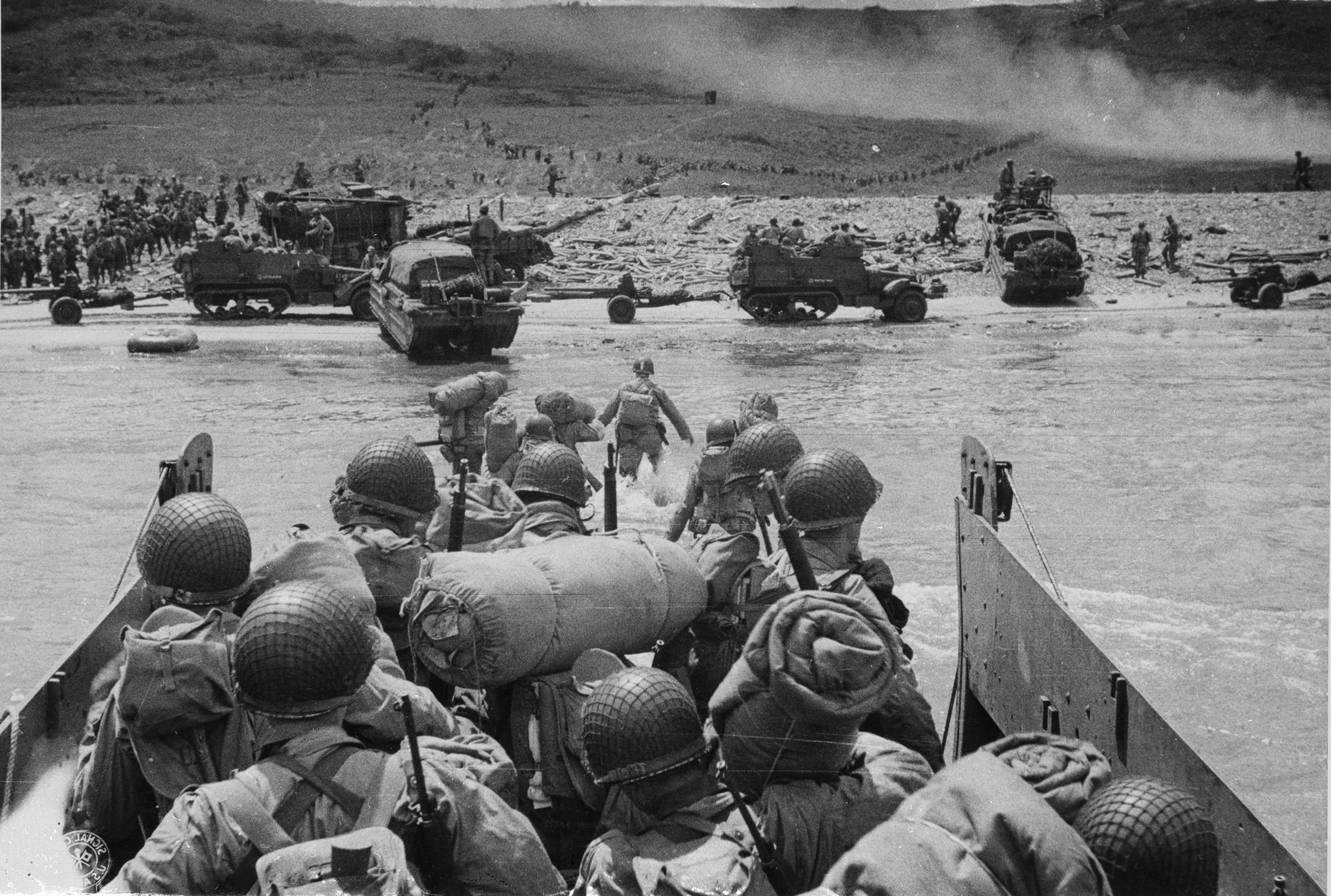
The 165th Photo Company getting ready to land on Omaha Beach on D-Day, June 6, 1944

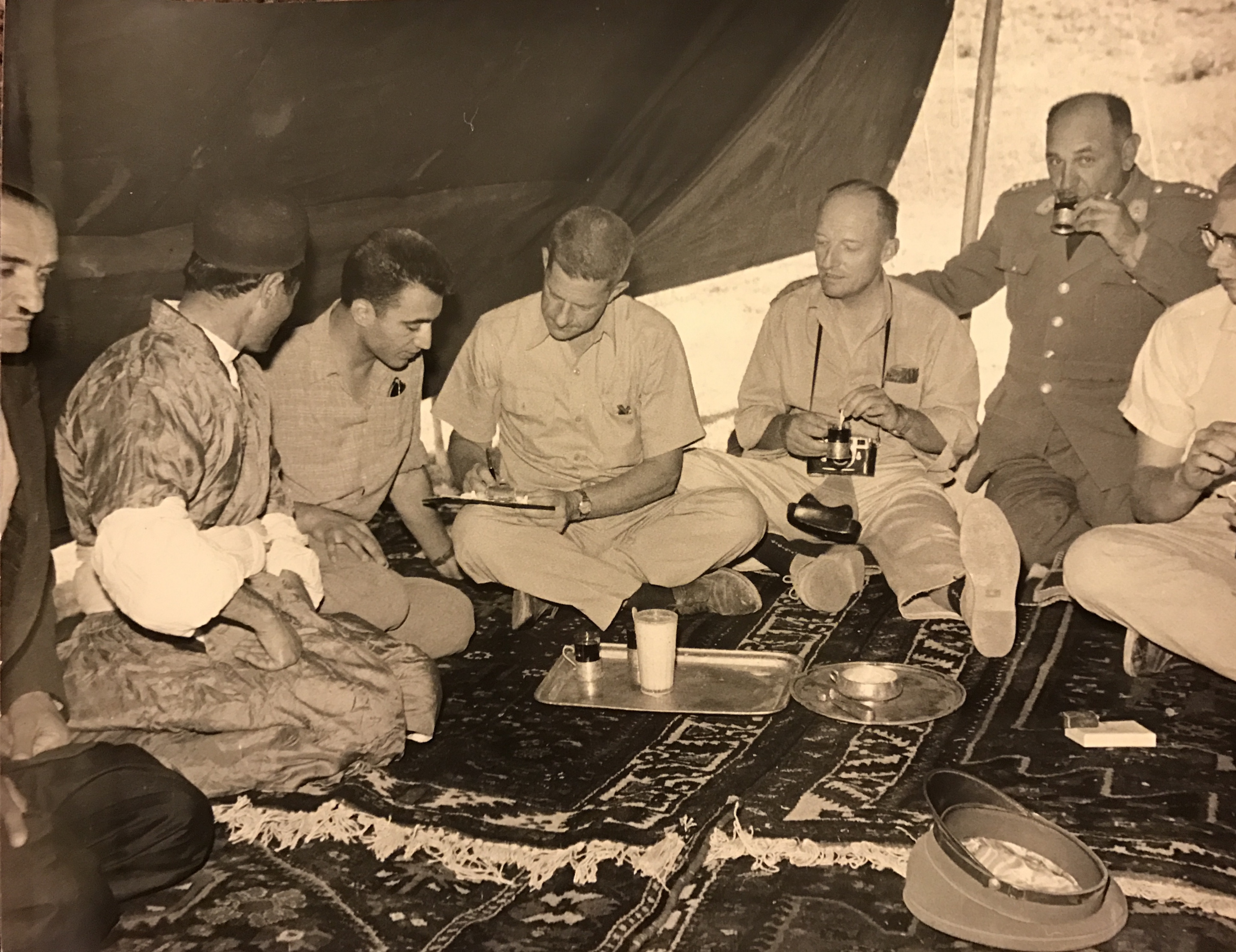
Wall and the Bakhtiari Tribe communicating via a translator

== War service ==
Wall was offered a commission to be an officer at the beginning of World War II. He entered into the United States Army as commanding officer of the 165th Signal Photo Company. While stationed in Chipping Sodbury, England, prior to D-Day, Wall, as commanding officer, had the honor of meeting the Queen Mother, as she reviewed the troops. Three months later, when Captain Wall heard news of the impending invasion of Normandy, he volunteered to go in with one of the first waves. The result of the 165th Signal Company going into Omaha Beach on the first wave eventually led to the first photos made public of the landing. Wall retired with the rank of major in 1945.

On June 6, 1944, the Allied Forces came ashore on Omaha Beach. Wall arranged to be one of the first off the boat carrying his 35 mm camera. After snapping a few shots, Captain Wall climbed to higher ground. A shell fell close to him. Shrapnel flew, hitting parts of Wall's body and destroying his left leg. His company sustained heavy casualties, with forty-eight percent of all Signal Corps personnel participating in the invasion being killed, wounded or captured.

Though severely injured, Wall held onto his 35mm Leica camera. His tenacity very well may have been the thing that kept him alive, along with his khaki uniform sealing his wounds. In the pre-operative tent, Wall spoke with the medical officer, Captain Joseph Aprile, who was attempting to save his life, saying the film from his camera needed to get back to headquarters. Finally being assured this would happen, he released the film. The Army Pictorial Service in London received, processed and distributed these photos, the greatest number of pictures released by a single photographer on D-Day.

Wall's photos showcased the landing crafts of all sizes and shapes approaching the Normandy coast, American assault troops landing on Omaha Beach and moving inland to further strengthen the opposition. These photographs would come to be seen by the entire world. Due to military protocol that no individual soldier get credit, Wall seldom is recognized for taking the first combat photos of the initial invasion. Currently, however, the Omaha Beach Museum, on site, has given him personal credit for his photos.

After the landing, Wall was moved from England to Percy Jones Hospital, in Battle Creek, Michigan, for further medical service. As his initial leg amputation was not properly carried out, it was there his leg was re-amputated and a year of physical therapy and healing took place.

Wall was awarded the Legion of Merit and the Purple Heart for his services during the Second World War. He retired as a major in 1945.

== Photography career ==
Wall's work has been featured in various magazines throughout his career, including Collier's, Life, American, Saturday Evening Post, Ladies Home Journal, and Time. Alongside these publications, his photographs were displayed and honored at international photographic salons from Amsterdam to Zagreb.

After WWII, he moved back to Los Angeles and kept busy with advertising photography and story illustration. He reassumed his association with Charles Kerlee until 1947, when Kerlee moved his business to New York City. Wall then decided to open his own studio in Los Angeles where he specialized in advertising, industrial and story illustration. In 1946, he was sent to photograph Jan DeGraff's world-famous Oregon Bulb Farm on assignment for Life Magazine. The magazine published a spectacular double page spread the following April of a field of approximately six million daffodils. This developed into a 35-year friendship with DeGraff, in which he returned each spring to photograph the famous hybrid lilies. This led him to other horticultural assignments and eventually becoming distinguished in this area. Wall gives the rare impression of three dimensions in his photography by blending qualities of light and camera angles.

In 1958, the International Communications Foundation sent him to the Middle East to shoot illustrations for a series of informational brochures aimed at “Peace Through Education.” He traveled for six months through Turkey, Iran, and Pakistan, notably spending time with the Nomadic Bakhtiari tribespeople. The photographs from this assignment are still used worldwide. In 1964, Eastman Kodak honored Wall's photographs of the hybrid lilies in particular with an exhibition at the New York World's Fair with a “Special Award for Photographic Excellence,” making him one of the Top 10 Photographers in the United States, according to Kodak. He was highlighted in a professional journal called “Applied Photography” and continued his relationship with Kodak and the editor, William A. Reedy.

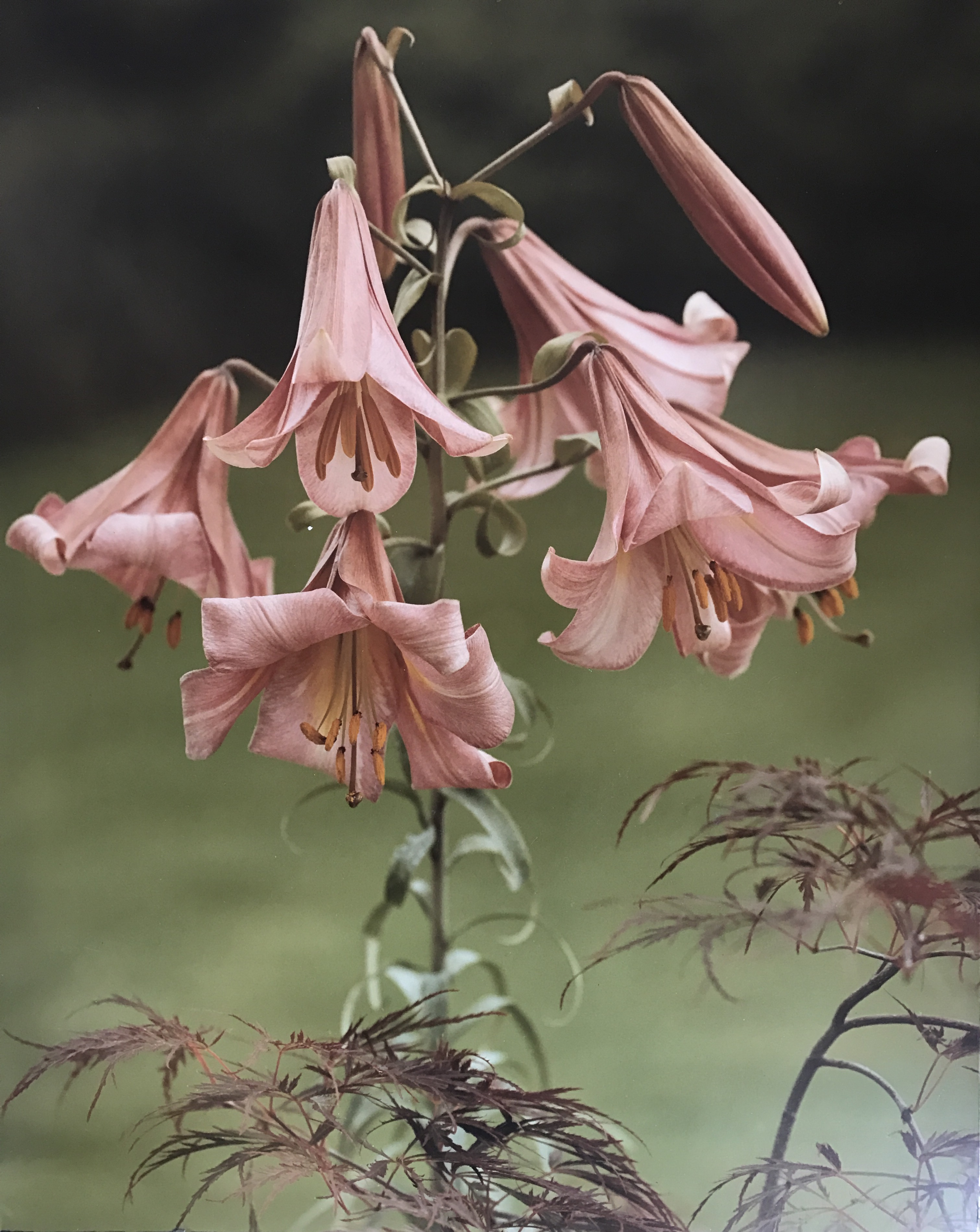
Lilies at the Bulb Farm as featured at the New York World's Fair

Wall has a way of gripping the senses with an invisible hand and drawing you to them. He relished in the various seasons and the different stories they told. In fact, he shot the landscapes of the Sierra Nevadas for over forty years, in each of the different seasons. Wall believed that the impact of pictures was not accidental and in fact stated, “You make up the rules after you shoot the picture. You just know when it’s right and you shoot it and then you make up the reasons why it works.”

In 1978, he collaborated with artist Trevor Goodman, who constructed scale models of Old West barns and buildings. Wall photographed these models annually for a Christmas card. Over his sixty-year career, Wall consistently carried a camera. His D-Day photographs are on display with name credit at The Omaha Beach Museum. Throughout his career, Wall worked with industry figures, including William A. Reedy, senior editor of advertising publications for Kodak's Professional and Finishing Markets Division and editor of the Kodak quarterly publication, Applied Photography. Reedy and Wall both focused on the desert and the High Sierras during these assignments.

== Personal life ==
Wall met his future wife, Ruth Hawks, at Percy Jones Hospital during the year he spent there in rehabilitation. He was told he’d never walk again, but eventually he overcame it with the help of a prosthetic leg. Wall moved back to Los Angeles and re-established his partnership with Charles Kerlee. Wall and his wife welcomed their daughter, Katherine Panatone (nee Wall), in 1951.

He took special interest in assisting other amputee patients at the UCLA prosthetics department. Wall was so comfortable with his prosthetic that you couldn’t even tell he was amputated above the knee, he aimed for this level of competency for his fellow amputees as well.

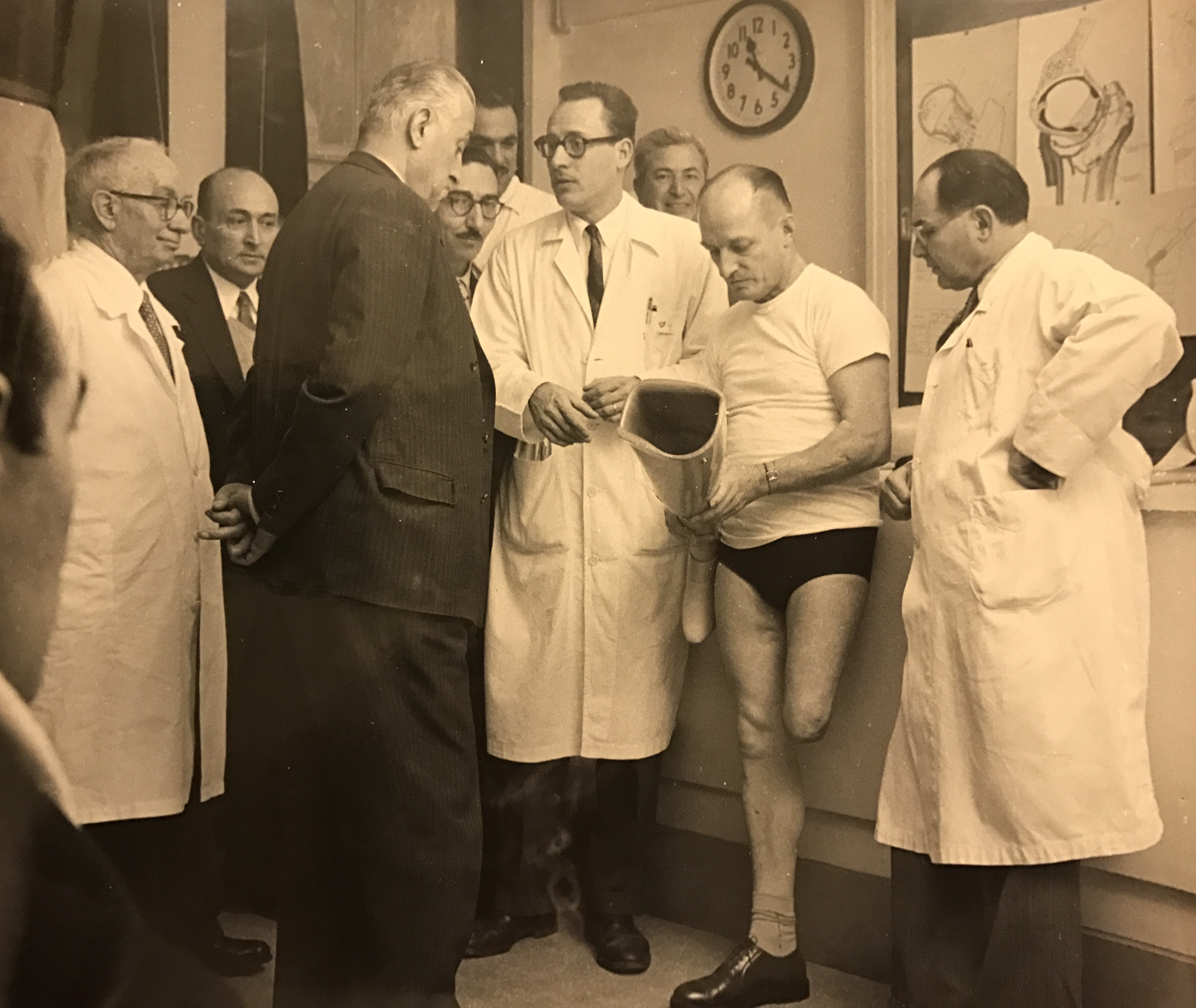
Wall as an amputee survivor

He returned to the Art Center in Los Angeles (now in Pasadena) to teach architectural lighting.

== Death and commemorations ==
Wall resided in Los Angeles with his wife and daughter until his death on January 13, 1997. He has been commemorated by the Major Herman V. Wall Memorial Award, which was most recently presented to Matt Hecht via the Eddie Adams Workshop.

At his memorial service, Wall’s wife, Ruth, said of her late husband, “It was like the outdoors was Herman's church. He was truly happy and at peace when he was fishing the headwaters of the Owens River, photographing the snow on the mountains, seeing a rainbow, etc."

== Awards ==
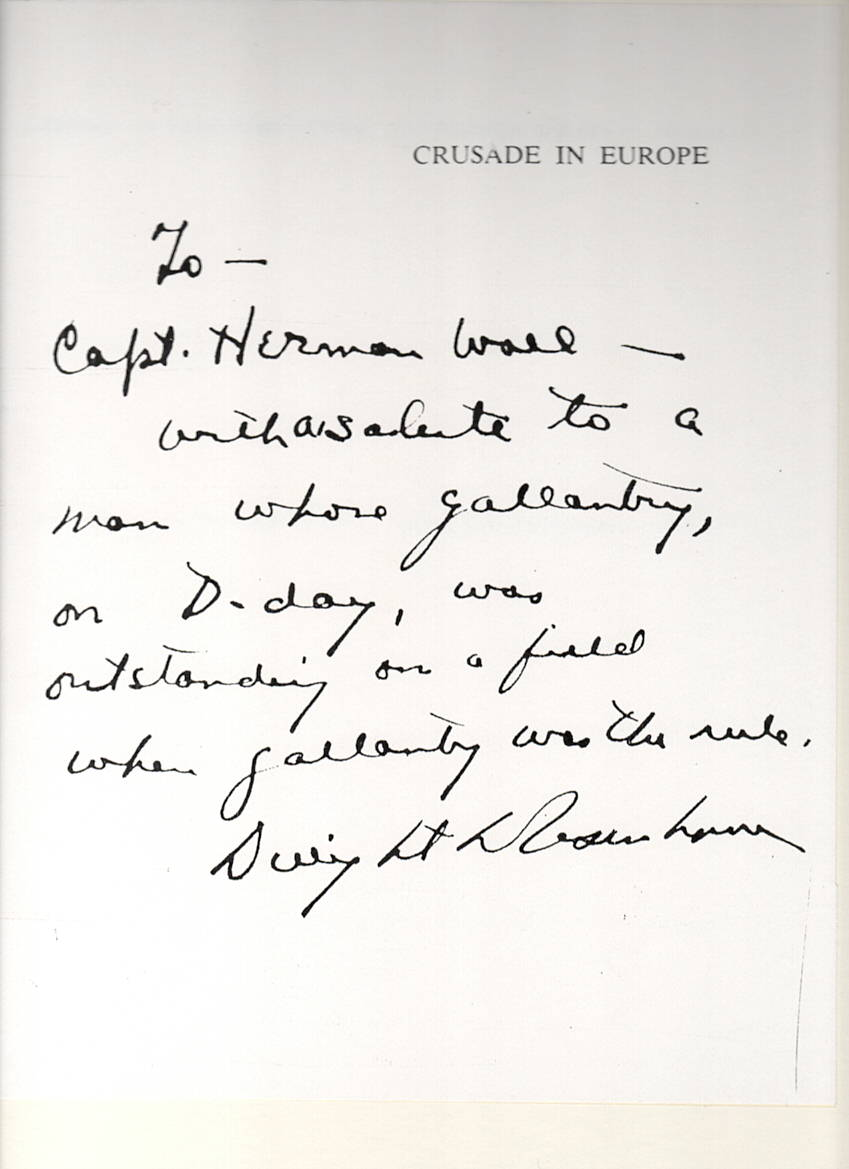
Personal recognition from Dwight D. Eisenhower for his services during the war, 1944

Wall was one of the late members of the “Camera Picotrialists of Los Angeles” in the 1930s. This pioneer photo group was the first to have international salon exhibits in Los Angeles. Due to his connection with this organization, Wall's prints were honored at the following national and international photographic salons: Internationale Focus Fotosalon, Amsterdam; International Salon Fotografije, Yugoslavia; Camera Pictorialists of Los Angeles, Los Angeles Museum; Fotosalon van Fotoclub Vooruit, Ghent, Belgium; Philadelphia National, Art Alliance; Toronto Salon of Photography, Toronto, Canada; International Salon, Frankfurt, Germany.

In 1936, he was awarded a special Golden plaque in Zagreb, Yugoslavia for his famous print “Weather-beaten” and several Bronze plaques in Amsterdam in 1936, 1937, and 1938. In 1942, Wall won an award at the Art Directors Club of New York's 21st Annual Exhibition for Color Photography in Advertising. General Eisenhower honored Wall with a copy of the book Crusade in Europe, in which he inscribed, “To Captain Herman Wall—With a salute to a man whose gallantry, on D-Day, was outstanding on a field when gallantry was the rule." - Dwight D. Eisenhower.

Posthumous awards: On June 15, 2024, Herman Wall was inducted as a Distinguished Member of the 165th Regiment at Fort Gordon in Augusta, Georgia. Also in June 2024, he was recognized for his leadership as commanding officer of the 165th Signal Corps on D-Day. The stone stele is located in La Combe, France.
