= Eric Andersen (footballer) =

Australian rules footballer, born 1904

Personal information
- Full name: Eric Carl Peter Andersen
- Born: 2 July 1904; Prahran, Victoria
- Died: 20 January 1997 (aged 92); Ringwood East, Victoria
- Original team: Point Cook Flying School
- Height: 179 cm (5 ft 10 in)
- Weight: 73.5 kg (162 lb)
- Position: Utility

Playing career^{1}
Years	Club	Games (Goals)
1926	Melbourne	2 (2)
1929–1930	Footscray	22 (2)
Total		24 (4)
- ^{1} Playing statistics correct to the end of 1930.

Eric Carl Peter Andersen (2 July 1904 – 20 January 1997) was an Australian rules footballer who played with Melbourne and Footscray in the Victorian Football League (VFL).
