= Gösta Andersson (wrestler) =

Swedish Greco-Roman wrestler (1917–1975)

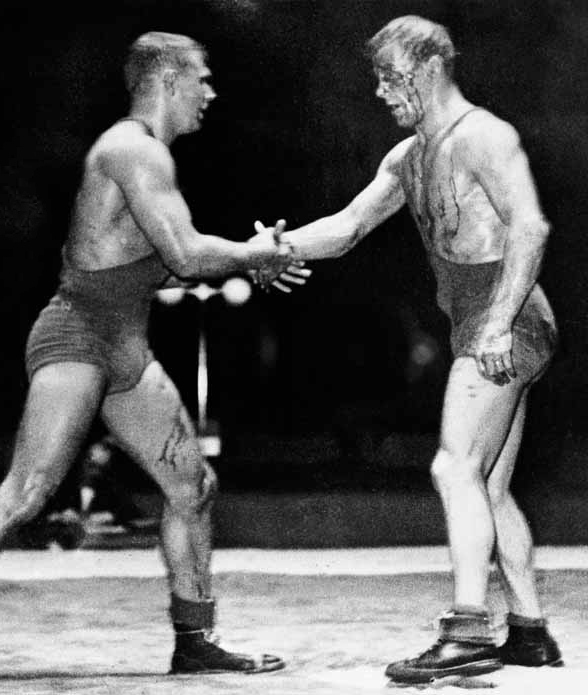
- Miklós Szilvási vs Gösta Andersson at the 1948 Olympics

Personal information
- Born: 15 February 1917 Selånger, Sweden
- Died: 12 September 1975 (aged 58) Sundsvall, Sweden

Sport
- Sport: Greco-Roman wrestling
- Club: SAIK, Sundsvall
Medal record
Men's Greco-Roman wrestling
Representing Sweden
Olympic Games
Gold medal – first place	1948 London	73 kg
Silver medal – second place	1952 Helsinki	73 kg
World Championships
Bronze medal – third place	1950 Stockholm	73 kg
European Championships
Gold medal – first place	1939 Oslo	66 kg
Silver medal – second place	1947 Prague	73 kg
Bronze medal – third place	1938 Tallinn	66 kg

Erik Gösta Andersson (15 February 1917 – 12 September 1975), known as Gösta Andersson, was a Swedish welterweight Greco-Roman wrestler. He competed at the 1948 and 1952 Summer Olympics and won a gold and a silver medal, respectively.

In the 1948 final against Miklós Szilvási, Andersson cut his eyebrow while leading 3:0. The referee allowed the bout to continue despite strong bleeding, and Andersson won the gold medal. He lost to Szilvási in the 1952 Olympic final.
