= Tsugio Yamazaki =

Japanese wrestler

Personal information
- Nationality: Japanese
- Born: 24 September 1929

Sport
- Sport: Wrestling

Tsugio Yamazaki (山崎 次男, Yamazaki Tsugio; born 24 September 1929) is a Japanese wrestler. He competed in the men's freestyle welterweight at the 1952 Summer Olympics.
