= Yushu Kitano =

Japanese freestyle wrestler

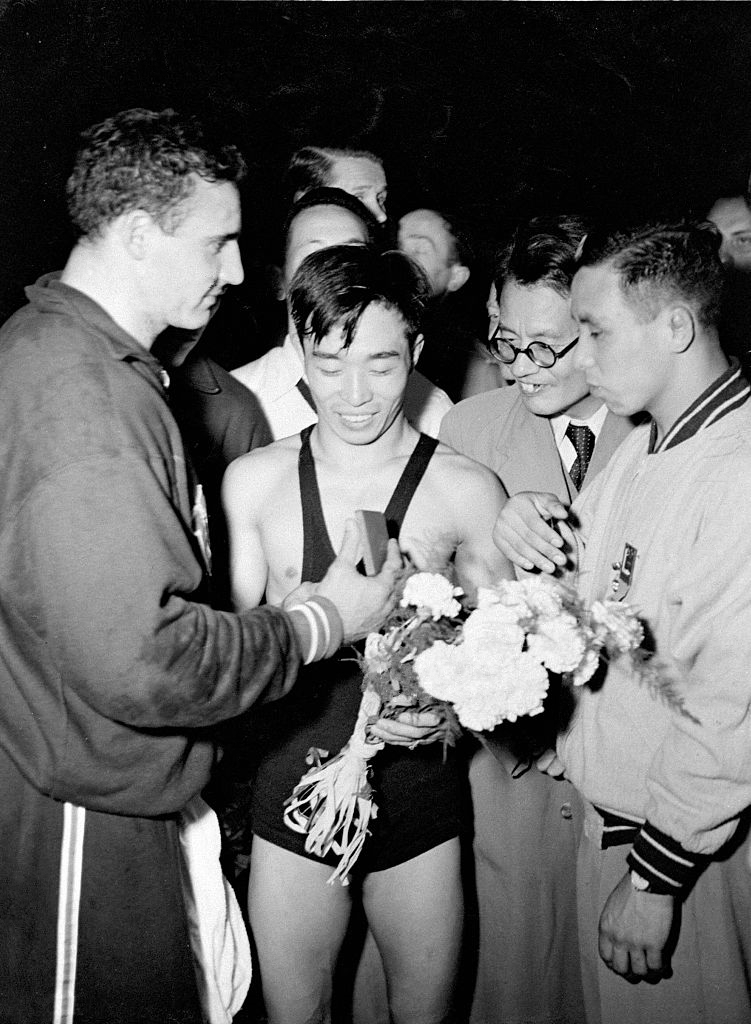
- Kitano (center) at the 1952 Olympics

Personal information
- Born: 14 April 1930 Osaka Prefecture, Japan
- Died: 27 February 2016 (aged 85) Nishinomiya, Hyogo Prefecture, Japan

Sport
- Sport: Freestyle wrestling
Medal record
Representing Japan
Olympic Games
Silver medal – second place	1952 Helsinki	52 kg
World Championships
Silver medal – second place	1954 Tokyo	52 kg
Asian Games
Silver medal – second place	1954 Manila	52 kg

Yushu Kitano (北野 祐秀, Kitano Yūshū; 14 April 1930 – 27 February 2016) was a Japanese freestyle wrestler. In his weight category of under 52 kg, he won silver medals at the 1952 Olympics, 1954 World Championships and 1954 Asian Games. In retirement he worked as a wrestling coach and in this capacity attended the 1960 Olympics. In 2016, he died of a heart attack, aged 85.
