= Abdollah Mojtabavi =

Iranian wrestler (1925–2012)

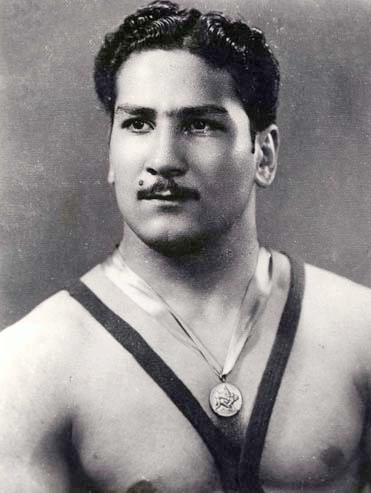

Personal information
- Native name: سید عبدالله مجتبوی
- Born: January 4, 1925 Tehran, Sublime State of Iran
- Died: January 13, 2012 (aged 87)

Sport
- Sport: Freestyle wrestling
Medal record
Representing Iran
Olympic Games
Bronze medal – third place	1952 Helsinki	73 kg
World Championships
Bronze medal – third place	1951 Helsinki	73 kg
European Championships
Silver medal – second place	1949 Istanbul	67 kg

Seyed Abdollah Mojtabavi (Persian: سید عبدالله مجتبوی, January 4, 1925 – January 13, 2012) was an Iranian welterweight freestyle wrestler. He won bronze medals at the 1951 World Championships and 1952 Summer Olympics.
