= Vasyl Rybalko =

Soviet wrestler

Personal information
- Nationality: Soviet
- Born: 6 June 1918 Stara Karan, Ukrainian SSR
- Died: 1973 (aged 54–55) Kyiv, Ukrainian SSR

Sport
- Sport: Wrestling

Vasyl Rybalko (6 June 1918 – 1973) was a Soviet wrestler. He competed in the men's freestyle welterweight at the 1952 Summer Olympics and was affiliated with Dynamo Kiev.
