= William Smith (wrestler) =

American wrestler (1928–2018)

Bill Smith
Personal information
- Born: September 17, 1928 Portland, Oregon, U.S.
- Died: March 20, 2018 (aged 89) Humboldt, Iowa, U.S.
- Home town: Council Bluffs, Iowa, U.S.

Sport
- Country: United States
- Sport: Wrestling
- Events: Freestyle and Folkstyle
- College team: Iowa State Teachers College
- Team: USA
Medal record
Men's freestyle wrestling
Representing the United States
Olympic Games
Gold medal – first place	1952 Helsinki	73 kg
Collegiate Wrestling
Representing Iowa State Teachers College
NCAA Championships
Gold medal – first place	1949 Fort Collins	165 lb
Gold medal – first place	1950 Cedar Falls	165 lb

William T. Smith (September 17, 1928 – March 20, 2018) was an American wrestler and Olympic champion in freestyle wrestling at the 1952 Olympic Games.

Smith was born in Portland, Oregon and graduated from Thomas Jefferson Senior High School in Council Bluffs, Iowa. He then enrolled at Iowa State Teachers College (now the University of Northern Iowa), where Smith won back-to-back NCAA wrestling titles at 165 pounds in 1949 and 1950. As a team, Iowa State Teachers College finished as NCAA Runners-Up in 1949 and NCAA Champions in 1950. He also won three Amateur Athletic Union (AAU) national titles. In 1978, Smith was inducted into the National Wrestling Hall of Fame as a Distinguished Member. Thomas Jefferson High School dedicated their Wrestling room shortly after they rebuilt their Activities Center Building in 2008. Smith died on March 20, 2018, at the age of 89. Intermat Wrestling website posted an article on Smith citing his accomplishments.

== Olympics ==
Smith competed at the 1952 Summer Olympics in Helsinki where he received a gold medal in Freestyle wrestling, competing in the welterweight class.
