= Semyon Marushkin =

Soviet wrestler

Personal information
- Born: 24 July 1919 Moscow, Russia
- Died: 4 September 1993 (aged 74) Moscow, Russia

Sport
- Sport: Greco-Roman wrestling
- Club: Spartak (1938–39); Dynamo (1941–53)
- Coached by: A. P. Dyakonov

Semyon Ivanovich Marushkin (Russian: Семён Иванович Марушкин, 24 July 1919 – 4 September 1993) was a welterweight Greco-Roman wrestler from Russia who competed at the 1952 Summer Olympics. He won his first three bouts, but then lost to the eventual silver medalist Gösta Andersson and ended in a fourth place. Domestically he won the Soviet title in Greco-Roman (1950 and 1951) and freestyle wrestling (1947).

Marushkin fought in World War II, and after retiring from competitions had a long career as a wrestling coach and referee.
