= Bjørn Cook =

Norwegian wrestler

Personal information
- Nationality: Norwegian
- Born: 11 April 1917; Trondheim
- Died: 30 September 2003 (aged 86)

Sport
- Country: Norway
- Sport: Wrestling

Bjørn Cook (11 April 1917 – 30 September 2003) was a Norwegian wrestler. He was born in Trondheim, and represented the club IF Ørnulf. He competed at the 1948 Summer Olympics in London.
