= Bela Čuzdi =

Serbian wrestler

Personal information
- Nationality: Serbian
- Born: 24 October 1926
- Died: 10 January 1997 (aged 70)

Sport
- Sport: Wrestling

Vojislav Bela Čuzdi (24 October 1926 – 10 January 1997) was a Serbian wrestler. He competed in the men's Greco-Roman welterweight at the 1952 Summer Olympics.
