= Niranjan Das (wrestler) =

Indian wrestler (1931–2010s

Personal information
- Nationality: Indian
- Born: 1931
- Died: between 2010 and 2018

Sport
- Sport: Wrestling

Niranjan Das (1931–2010s) was an Indian wrestler. He competed in the men's freestyle flyweight at the 1952 Summer Olympics.

Das won the Hind Kesari championship in 1963. He died between 2010 and 2018.
