= Jean Feller =

Luxembourgish footballer

Personal information
- Date of birth: 16 October 1919
- Place of birth: Tétange, Luxembourg
- Date of death: 1 January 1997 (aged 77)
- Place of death: Niederkorn, Luxembourg

International career
Years	Team	Apps	(Gls)
- Luxembourg

Jean Feller (16 October 1919 – 1 January 1997) was a Luxembourgish footballer. He competed in the men's tournament at the 1948 Summer Olympics.
