= Henrik Hansen (wrestler) =

Danish sport wrestler (1920–2010)

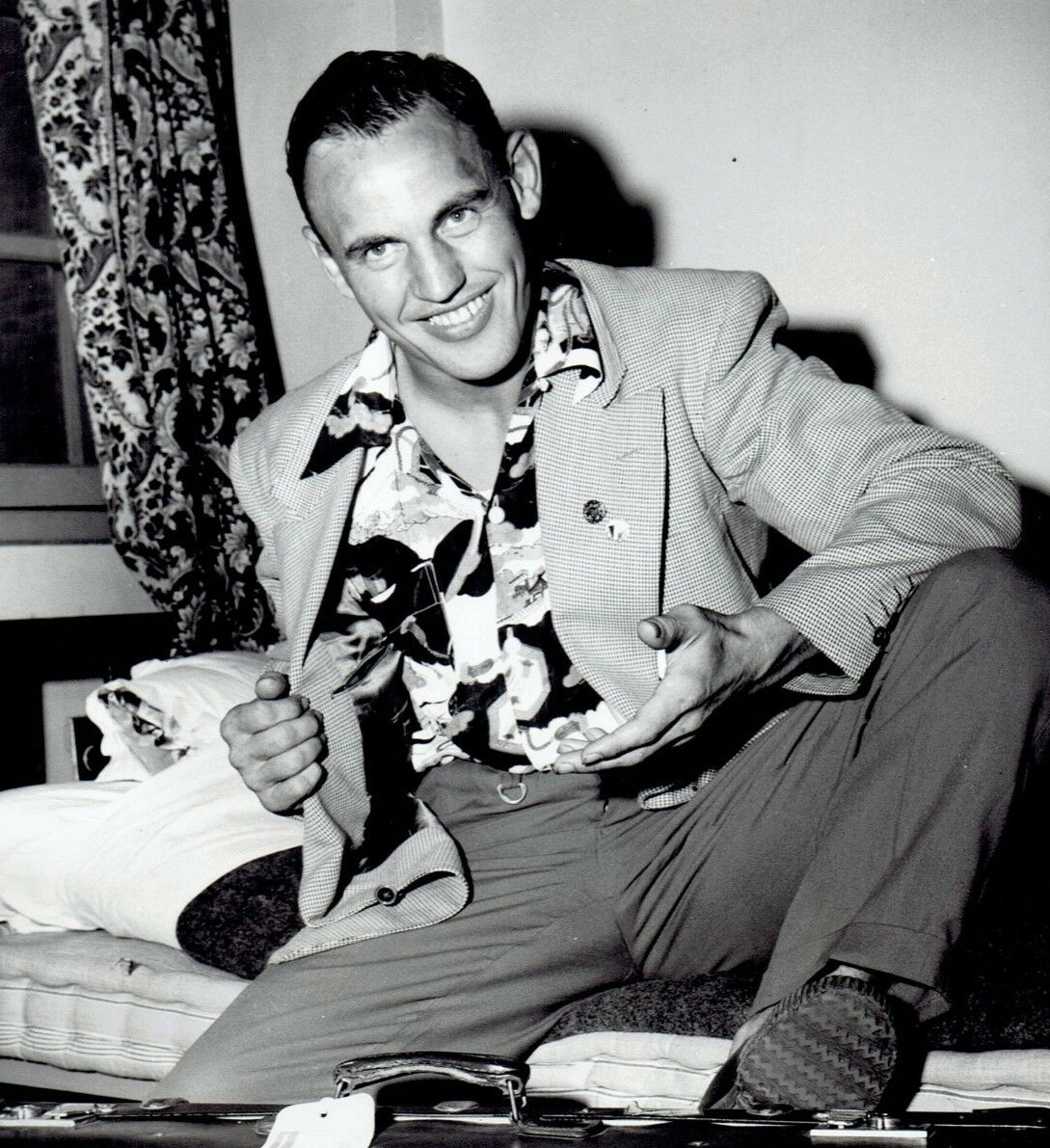
- Hansen in Tokyo in 1954

Personal information
- Full name: Christian Henrik Hansen
- Born: 26 May 1920 Melby, Denmark
- Died: 23 August 2010 (aged 90) North Stonington, Connecticut, U.S.

Sport
- Sport: Greco-Roman wrestling
- Club: AK DAN, Ballerup
Medal record
Men's Greco-Roman wrestling
Representing Denmark
Olympic Games
Bronze medal – third place	1948 London	73 kg

Christian Henrik Hansen (26 May 1920 – 23 August 2010) was a Danish sport wrestler. He won a bronze medal in Greco-Roman wrestling, welterweight class, at the 1948 Summer Olympics in London. Next year he competed in freestyle wrestling at European championships and placed fifth.
