= Bev Scott =

Australian wrestler

Personal information
- Nationality: Australian
- Born: 30 September 1914 Tasmania, Australia
- Died: 27 October 1998 (aged 84) Victoria, Australia

Sport
- Sport: Wrestling

Bev Scott (30 September 1914 – 27 October 1998) was an Australian wrestler. He competed in the men's freestyle welterweight at the 1952 Summer Olympics.
