= Heng Freylinger =

Luxembourgish wrestler

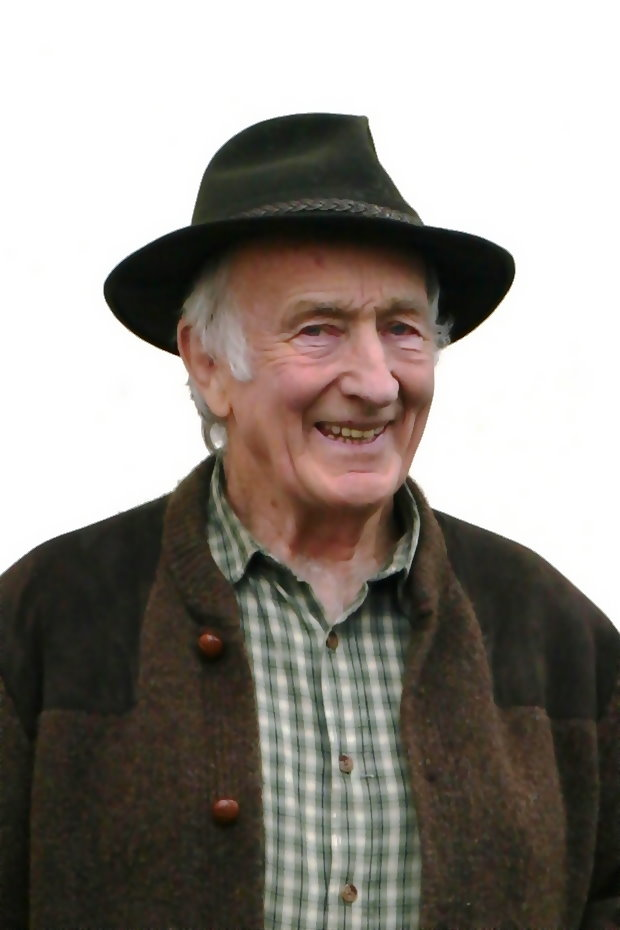
- Freylinger in March 2008
- Born: 23 September 1926; Schuttrange, Luxembourg, Luxembourg
- Died: 17 January 2017 (aged 90)

Henri "Heng" Freylinger (23 September 1926 – 17 January 2017) was a Luxembourgish wrestler. He competed in the Greco-Roman welterweight event at the 1952 Summer Olympics.
