= Georgy Sayadov =

Soviet wrestler (born 1931)

Personal information
- Born: 12 February 1931 (age 95) Baku, Azerbaijan SSR, USSR

Sport
- Sport: Freestyle wrestling
- Club: Dynamo
Medal record
Representing Soviet Union
Freestyle wrestling
World Cup
| Gold medal – first place | 1958 Sofia | -52 kg |

Georgy Vaganovich Sayadov (Russian: Георгий Ваганович Саядов; born 12 February 1931) is a retired flyweight freestyle wrestler from Azerbaijan who competed for the Soviet Union at the 1952 Summer Olympics. He won his first four bouts, but then lost to Mahmoud Mollaghasemi and ended in a fourth place. Domestically he won the Soviet title in 1953 and 1958. Sayadov was born to the Armenian wrestler Vagan Sayadyan, who changed his last name to Sayadov to blend in Azerbaijan. Georgy had four brothers, and one of them, Armais, competed in Greco-Roman wrestling at the 1964 Olympics.
