= Anton Mackowiak =

German wrestler

Personal information
- Nationality: German
- Born: 29 September 1922; Dortmund, Germany
- Died: 22 December 2013 (aged 91); Dortmund, Germany

Sport
- Sport: Wrestling

Anton Mackowiak (29 September 1922 – 22 December 2013) was a German wrestler. He competed in two events at the 1952 Summer Olympics.
