= René Chesneau =

French wrestler

Personal information
- Nationality: French
- Born: 17 September 1919
- Died: 25 October 2006 (aged 87)

Sport
- Sport: Wrestling

René Chesneau (17 September 1919 – 25 October 2006) was a French wrestler. He competed at the 1948 Summer Olympics and the 1952 Summer Olympics.
