= Jos De Jong =

Belgian wrestler (1920–1986)

Christiaan Jozef De Jong
Personal information
- Nationality: Belgian
- Born: 27 May 1920; Antwerp, Belgium
- Died: August 1986 (aged 66); Deurne, Belgium

Sport
- Sport: Wrestling

Jos De Jong (27 May 1920 – August 1986) was a Belgian wrestler. He competed in two events at the 1952 Summer Olympics.
