= Vladislav Sekal =

Czech wrestler

Personal information
- Nationality: Czech
- Born: 18 January 1930; Tábor, Czechoslovakia

Sport
- Sport: Wrestling

Vladislav Sekal (born 18 January 1930) is a Czech wrestler. He competed in two events at the 1952 Summer Olympics.
