= Aleksanteri Keisala =

Finnish wrestler (1916–1983)

Personal information
- Nationality: Finnish
- Born: 31 May 1916; Lapua, Finland
- Died: 15 May 1983 (aged 66); Lapua, Finland

Sport
- Sport: Wrestling

Aleksanteri Keisala (31 May 1916 – 15 May 1983) was a Finnish wrestler. He competed at the 1948 Summer Olympics and the 1952 Summer Olympics.
