= Alberto Longarella =

Argentine wrestler (1923–2017)

Personal information
- Nationality: Argentine
- Born: 13 May 1923
- Died: 15 March 2017 (aged 93)

Sport
- Sport: Wrestling

Alberto Longarella (13 May 1923 – 15 March 2017) was an Argentine wrestler. He competed at the 1948 Summer Olympics and the 1952 Summer Olympics.
