= Mahmoud Mollaghasemi =

Iranian wrestler (1929–2026)

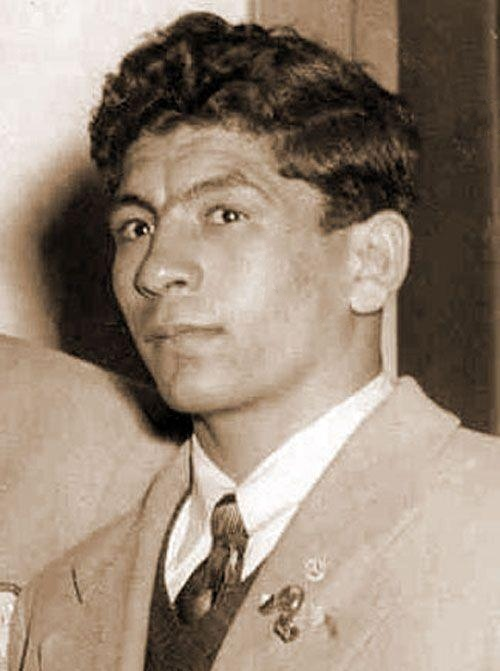
- Mollaghasemi in the 1950s

Personal information
- Born: 5 April 1929 Tehran, Persia
- Died: 30 June 2026 (aged 97)

Sport
- Sport: Freestyle wrestling
Medal record
Representing Iran
Olympic Games
Bronze medal – third place	1952 Helsinki	52 kg
World Championships
Silver medal – second place	1951 Helsinki	52 kg

Mahmoud Mollaghasemi Tabrizi (Persian: محمود ملاقاسمی تبریزی; 5 April 1929 – 30 June 2026) was an Iranian freestyle wrestler. He won a silver medal at the 1951 World Championships and a bronze medal at the 1952 Olympics.

Mollaghasemi was the eldest child in a large family. He lost his father, a shoemaker, at an early age, and had to start working to support his family. He took up wrestling at the age of 18. After retiring from competitions, he worked as a wrestling coach and international referee, and attended the 1964 Olympics in that capacity.

Mollaghasemi died on 30 June 2026, at the age of 97.
