= Veikko Männikkö =

Finnish wrestler (1921–2012)

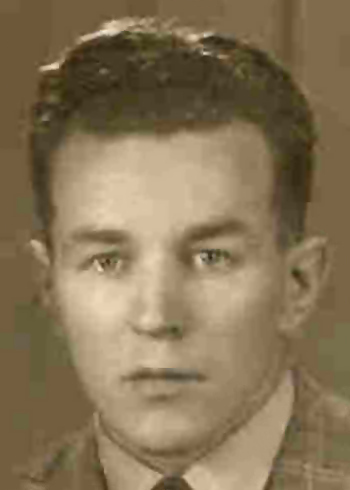

Personal information
- Born: 28 December 1921 Jalasjärvi, Finland
- Died: 19 June 2012 (aged 90) Seinäjoki, Finland
- Height: 173 cm (5 ft 8 in)

Sport
- Sport: Greco-Roman wrestling
- Club: TUL

Veikko Iisakki Männikkö (28 December 1921 – 19 June 2012) was a Greco-Roman wrestler from Finland who won the national welterweight title (under 73 kg) in 1946 and 1950–1952, finishing second-third in 1948–49 and 1954. He competed at the 1948 and 1952 Summer Olympics and placed fourth in 1948. After retiring from competitions Männikkö worked at the Seinäjoki city government in 1955–1960. In parallel he acted as a sports official and functionary. He was married and had four children, born in 1946, 1954, 1955 and 1957.
