= Louis Baise =

South African wrestler (1927–2020)

Personal information
- Born: May 4, 1927
- Died: 11 May 2020 (aged 93)

Sport
- Sport: Wrestling
Medal record
Men's Freestyle wrestling
Representing South Africa
British Empire (and Commonwealth) Games
| Gold medal – first place | 1954 Vancouver | Men's Flyweight |

Louis Joseph Baise (4 May 1927 – 11 May 2020) was a South African Olympic wrestler.

== Biography ==
Baise was Jewish, and won gold medals at the 1950 Maccabiah Games and the 1953 Maccabiah Games in Israel. He competed in the 1952 Summer Olympics in Helsinki for South Africa, coming in 6th in the Men's Flyweight, Freestyle. Baise won the 1954 British Empire and Commonwealth Games Flyweight (−52.0 kg) Freestyle gold medal in Vancouver.

Baise died in Australia on 11 May 2020, aged 93.
