= Soviet Union at the 1952 Summer Olympics =

- Flag of the Soviet Union
- IOC code: URS
- NOC: Soviet Olympic Committee

in Helsinki, Finland 19 July 1952 – 3 August 1952
- Competitors: 295 (255 men, 40 women) in 18 sports
- Flag bearer: Yakov Kutsenko
- Medals Ranked 2nd: Gold 22 Silver 30 Bronze 19 Total 71

Summer Olympics appearances (overview)
- 1952; 1956; 1960; 1964; 1968; 1972; 1976; 1980; 1984; 1988

Other related appearances
- Russian Empire (1900–1912); Estonia (1920–1936, 1992–pres.); Latvia (1924–1936, 1992–pres.); Lithuania (1924–1928, 1992–pres.); Unified Team (1992); Armenia (1994–pres.); Belarus (1994–2020); Georgia (1994–pres.); Kazakhstan (1994–pres.); Kyrgyzstan (1994–pres.); Moldova (1994–pres.); Russia (1994–2016); Ukraine (1994–pres.); Uzbekistan (1994–pres.); Azerbaijan (1996–pres.); Tajikistan (1996–pres.); Turkmenistan (1996–pres.); ROC (2020); Individual Neutral Athletes (2024)

The Soviet Union (USSR) competed in the Olympic Games for the first time at the 1952 Summer Olympics in Helsinki, Finland. 295 competitors, 255 men and 40 women, took part in 141 events in 18 sports.

== Medalists ==
With 22 gold and 71 total medals, the USSR finished second in the final medal rankings.

=== Gold ===
Medal	Name	Sport	Event	Date
Gold	Nina Ponomaryova	Athletics	Women's discus throw	20 July
Gold	Victor Chukarin	Gymnastics	Men's individual all-around	21 July
Gold	Vladimir Belyakov; Iosif Berdiev; Victor Chukarin; Yevgeni Korolkov; Dmytro Leonkin; Valentin Muratov; Mikhail Perelman; Hrant Shahinyan	Gymnastics	Men's team all-around	21 July
Gold	Victor Chukarin	Gymnastics	Men's vault	21 July
Gold	Hrant Shahinyan	Gymnastics	Men's rings	21 July
Gold	Victor Chukarin	Gymnastics	Men's pommel horse	21 July
Gold	Yuriy Tyukalov	Rowing	Men's single sculls	23 July
Gold	David Tsimakuridze	Wrestling	Men's freestyle middleweight	23 July
Gold	Arsen Mekokishvili	Wrestling	Men's freestyle heavyweight	23 July
Gold	Maria Gorokhovskaya	Gymnastics	Women's individual all-around	23 July
Gold	Nina Bocharova; Pelageya Danilova; Medeya Dzhugeli; Maria Gorokhovskaya; Ekaterina Kalinchuk; Galina Minaicheva; Galina Shamrai; Galina Urbanovich	Gymnastics	Women's team all-around	23 July
Gold	Ekaterina Kalinchuk	Gymnastics	Women's vault	23 July
Gold	Nina Bocharova	Gymnastics	Women's balance beam	23 July
Gold	Ivan Udodov	Weightlifting	Men's 56 kg	25 July
Gold	Rafael Chimishkyan	Weightlifting	Men's 60 kg	25 July
Gold	Galina Zybina	Athletics	Women's shot put	26 July
Gold	Boris Gurevich	Wrestling	Men's Greco-Roman flyweight	27 July
Gold	Yakov Punkin	Wrestling	Men's Greco-Roman featherweight	27 July
Gold	Shazam Safin	Wrestling	Men's Greco-Roman lightweight	27 July
Gold	Johannes Kotkas	Wrestling	Men's Greco-Roman heavyweight	27 July
Gold	Anatoli Bogdanov	Shooting	Men's 300 metre free rifle, three positions	27 July
Gold	Trofim Lomakin	Weightlifting	Men's 82.5 kg	27 July

=== Silver ===
Medal	Name	Sport	Event	Date
Silver	Elizaveta Bagryantseva	Athletics	Women's discus throw	20 July
Silver	Yuriy Lituyev	Athletics	Men's 400 metres hurdles	21 July
Silver	Hrant Shahinyan	Gymnastics	Men's individual all-around	21 July
Silver	Viktor Chukarin	Gymnastics	Men's parallel bars	21 July
Silver	Viktor Chukarin	Gymnastics	Men's rings	21 July
Silver	Hrant Shahinyan	Gymnastics	Men's pommel horse	21 July
Silver	Yevgeni Korolkov	Gymnastics	Men's pommel horse	21 July
Silver	Ihor Yemchuk; Heorhiy Zhylin	Rowing	Men's double sculls	23 July
Silver	Slava Amiragov; Igor Borisov; Yevgeny Brago; Leonid Gissen; Aleksey Komarov; Vladimir Kryukov; Vladimir Rodimushkin; Yevgeny Samsonov	Rowing	Men's eight	23 July
Silver	Rashid Mammadbeyov	Wrestling	Men's freestyle bantamweight	23 July
Silver	Leonid Shcherbakov	Athletics	Men's triple jump	23 July
Silver	Aleksandra Chudina	Athletics	Women's long jump	23 July
Silver	Nina Bocharova	Gymnastics	Women's individual all-around	23 July
Silver	Maria Gorokhovskaya	Gymnastics	Women's floor	23 July
Silver	Maria Gorokhovskaya	Gymnastics	Women's balance beam	23 July
Silver	Maria Gorokhovskaya	Gymnastics	Women's uneven bars	23 July
Silver	Maria Gorokhovskaya	Gymnastics	Women's vault	23 July
Silver	Nina Bocharova; Pelageya Danilova; Medeya Dzhugeli; Maria Gorokhovskaya; Ekaterina Kalinchuk; Galina Minaicheva; Galina Shamrai; Galina Urbanovich	Gymnastics	Women's team portable apparatus	24 July
Silver	Maria Golubnichaya	Athletics	Women's 80 metres hurdles	24 July
Silver	Aleksandra Chudina	Athletics	Women's javelin throw	24 July
Silver	Vladimir Kazantsev	Athletics	Men's 3000 metres steeplechase	24 July
Silver	Nikolai Saksonov	Weightlifting	Men's 60 kg	25 July
Silver	Yevgeni Lopatin	Weightlifting	Men's 67.5 kg	26 July
Silver	Grigori Novak	Weightlifting	Men's 90 kg	27 July
Silver	Levan Kalyayev; Levan Sanadze; Vladimir Sukharev; Boris Tokarev	Athletics	Men's 4 × 100 metres relay	27 July
Silver	Shalva Chikhladze	Wrestling	Men's Greco-Roman light heavyweight	27 July
Silver	Boris Andreyev	Shooting	Men's 50 metre rifle prone	29 July
Silver	Viktor Mednov	Boxing	Men's light welterweight	2 August
Silver	Sergei Scherbakov	Boxing	Men's welterweight	2 August
Silver	Stepas Brutautas; Nodar Dzhordzhikiya; Anatoly Konev; Otar Korkiya; Heino Kruus; Ilmar Kullam; Justinas Lagunavičius; Joann Lõssov; Aleksandr Moiseyev; Yuri Ozerov; Kazys Petkevičius; Stasys Stonkus; Maigonis Valdmanis; Viktor Vlasov	Basketball	Men's team	2 August

=== Bronze ===
- Dmitri Leonkin (SKA Lviv) — Artistic gymnastics, men's rings
- Galina Minaicheva (Dynamo Moscow) — Artistic gymnastics, women's vault
- Aleksandr Anufriyev (Torpedo Gorky) — Athletics, men's 10000 m
- Bruno Junk (Dynamo Tallinn) — Athletics, men's 10000 m walk
- Nadezhda Khnykina-Dvalishvili (Dinamo Tbilisi) — Athletics, women's 200 m
- Nina Dumbadze (Dinamo Tbilisi) — Athletics, women's discus throw
- Aleksandra Chudina (Dynamo Moscow) — Athletics, women's high jump
- Yelena Gorchakova (Burevestnik Moscow) — Athletics, women's javelin throw
- Klavdia Tochonova (Medik Leningrad) — Athletics, women's shot put
- Anatoli Bulakov (Dynamo Moscow) — Boxing, men's flyweight
- Gennadi Garbuzov (Dynamo Moscow) — Boxing, men's bantamweight
- Boris Tishin (Krylia Sovetov Moscow) — Boxing, men's light-middleweight
- Anatoli Perov (Trudovye Rezervy Moscow) — Boxing, men's light-heavyweight
- Nina Savina (Pischevik Leningrad) — Canoeing, women's K1 500 m
- Lev Vainshtein (Dynamo Leningrad) — Shooting, men's 300 m free rifle 3 positions
- Boris Andreyev (CSKA Moscow) — Shooting, men's 50 m rifle 3 positions
- Arkadi Vorobyov (SKA Sverdlovsk) — Weightlifting, men's light-heavyweight
- Artem Teryan (Dynamo Baku) — Wrestling, men's Greco-Roman bantamweight
- Nikolay Belov (Dynamo Moscow) — Wrestling, men's Greco-Roman middleweight

Medals by sport
Sport	1st place, gold medalist(s)	2nd place, silver medalist(s)	3rd place, bronze medalist(s)	Total
Gymnastics	9	11	2	22
Wrestling	6	2	2	10
Weightlifting	3	3	1	7
Athletics	2	8	7	17
Rowing	1	2	0	3
Shooting	1	1	2	4
Boxing	0	2	4	6
Basketball	0	1	0	1
Canoeing	0	0	1	1
Total	22	30	19	71

Multiple medalists
Name	Sport	1st place, gold medalist(s)	2nd place, silver medalist(s)	3rd place, bronze medalist(s)	Total
Viktor Chukarin	Gymnastics	4	2	0	6
Maria Gorokhovskaya	Gymnastics	2	5	0	7
Nina Bocharova	Gymnastics	2	2	0	4
Hrant Shahinyan	Gymnastics	2	2	0	4
Ekaterina Kalinchuk	Gymnastics	2	1	0	3
Galina Minaicheva	Gymnastics	1	1	1	3
Yevgeni Korolkov	Gymnastics	1	1	0	2
Pelageya Danilova	Gymnastics	1	1	0	2
Medeya Dzhugeli	Gymnastics	1	1	0	2
Galina Shamrai	Gymnastics	1	1	0	2
Galina Urbanovich	Gymnastics	1	1	0	2
Dmitri Leonkin	Gymnastics	1	0	1	2
Aleksandra Chudina	Athletics	0	2	1	3
Boris Andreyev	Shooting	0	1	1	2

== Athletics ==
Key

- Note – Ranks given for track events are within the athlete's heat only
- Q = Qualified for the next round
- q = Qualified for the next round as a fastest loser or, in field events, by position without achieving the qualifying target
- NR = National record
- N/A = Round not applicable for the event
- Bye = Athlete not required to compete in round

Men
Track & road events

Athlete	Events	Heat		Quarterfinal		Semifinal		Final	
Athlete	Events	Result	Rank	Result	Rank	Result	Rank	Result	Rank
Aleksandr Anufriyev	5000 m	14:23.6	1 Q	—N/a				14:31.4	10
Aleksandr Anufriyev	10,000 m	—N/a						29:48.2	3rd place, bronze medalist(s)
Mykola Belokurov	1500 m	3:56.4	4 Q	—N/a		3:55.6	11	Did not advance	
Yevhen Bulanchyk	110 m hurdles	14.65	1 Q	—N/a		14.70	2 Q	14.73	4
Petro Chevhun	800 m	1:51.8	2 Q	—N/a		1:52.8	7	Did not advance	
Ardalion Ignatyev	400 m	48.22	1 Q	48.25	3 Q	47.49	5	Did not advance	
Georgy Ivakin	800 m	1:56.4	5	—N/a		Did not advance			
Bruno Junk	10 km walk	45:05.8	1 Q	—N/a				45:41.0	3rd place, bronze medalist(s)
Pavel Kazankov	50 km walk	—N/a						5:02:37.8	23
Mikhail Kazantsev	100 m	11.16	3	Did not advance					
Vladimir Kazantsev	3000 m steeplechase	8:58.0 OR	1 Q	—N/a				8:51.6	2nd place, silver medalist(s)
Nikolay Kuchurin	1500 m	4:03.6	8	—N/a		Did not advance			
Yuriy Lituyev	400 m	49.01	2	Did not advance					
Yuriy Lituyev	400 m hurdles	53.5	1 Q	52.2	1 Q	51.8	1 Q	51.3	2nd place, silver medalist(s)
Sergey Lobastov	50 km walk	—N/a						4:32:34.2	5
Timofey Lunev	400 m hurdles	54.3	1 Q	52.7	1 Q	53.1	6	Did not advance	
Fyodor Marulin	3000 m steeplechase	9:08.4	4	—N/a				Did not advance	
Gennady Modoy	800 m	1:55.8	3 Q	—N/a		1:55.7	7	Did not advance	
Yakov Moskachenkov	Marathon	—N/a						2:34:43.8	20
Edmunds Pīlāgs	400 m	49.29	3	Did not advance					
Nikifor Popov	5000 m	14:28.5	6	—N/a				Did not advance	
Nikifor Popov	10,000 m	—N/a						30:24.2	11
Sergey Popov	110 m hurdles	14.99	2 Q	—N/a		15.04	4	Did not advance	
Ivan Pozhidayev	10,000 m	—N/a						30:13.4	9
Mikhail Saltykov	3000 m steeplechase	8:55.8	2 Q	—N/a				8:56.2	7
Levan Sanadze	100 m	11.13	3	Did not advance					
Levan Sanadze	200 m	22.26	1 Q	22.26	4	Did not advance			
Ivan Semyonov	5000 m	14:28.0	6	—N/a				Did not advance	
Grigory Suchkov	Marathon	—N/a						2:38:28.8	28
Vladimir Sukharev	100 m	10.93	1 Q	10.92	3 Q	10.86	3 Q	10.88	5
Vladimir Sukharev	200 m	22.08	1 Q	21.88	3	Did not advance			
Vladimir Ukhov	50 km walk	—N/a						4:32:51.6	6
Feodosiy Vanin	Marathon	—N/a						2:38:22.0	27
Mikhail Velsvebel	1500 m	3:52.6	4 Q	—N/a		3:52.6	11	Did not advance	
Ivan Yarmysh	10 km walk	47:26.0	6 Q	—N/a				46:07.0	6
Anatoliy Yulin	400 m hurdles	53.6	1 Q	52.4	2 Q	52.1	3 Q	52.8	4
Pēteris Zeltiņš	10 km walk	Disqualified		—N/a				Did not advance	
Levan Kalyayev; Levan Sanadze; Vladimir Sukharev; Boris Tokarev	4 × 100 m relay	41.45	1 Q	—N/a		41.01	2 Q	40.58	2nd place, silver medalist(s)
Ardalion Ignatyev; Gennady Slepnyov; Edmunds Pīlāgs; Yuriy Lituyev	4 × 400 m relay	3:12.65	3	—N/a				Did not advance	

Field events

Athlete	Event	Qualification		Final	
Athlete	Event	Distance	Position	Distance	Position
Nikolay Anryushchenko	Long jump	6.74	22	Did not advance	
Volodymyr Brazhnyk	Pole vault	4.00	15 Q	4.20	7
Boris Butenko	Discus throw	46.43	14 Q	48.15	11
Petro Denysenko	Pole vault	4.00	1 Q	4.40	4
Heorhiy Dybenko	Hammer throw	53.70	8 Q	55.03	8
Georgy Fyodorov	Shot put	15.16	7 Q	16.06	7
Oto Grigalka	Shot put	15.90	2 Q	16.78	4
Oto Grigalka	Discus throw	48.93	3 Q	50.71	6
Leonid Grigoryev	Long jump	7.09	12 q	7.14	6
Yury Ilyasov	High jump	1.87	24 Q	1.90	13
Viktor Knyazev	Pole vault	4.00	14 Q	4.20	8
Mikhail Krivonosov	Hammer throw	51.15	13 Q	NM	—
Vladimir Kuznetsov	Javelin throw	64.38	17 Q	70.37	6
Khandadash Madatov	Long jump	NM	—	Did not advance	
Boris Matveyev	Discus throw	46.05	16 Q	48.70	10
Mykola Redkin	Hammer throw	53.58	11 Q	56.55	85
Leonid Shcherbakov	Triple jump	15.05	3 Q	15.98	2nd place, silver medalist(s)
Yury Shcherbakov	Javelin throw	64.39	16 Q	64.52	13
Viktor Tsybulenko	Javelin throw	69.42	3 Q	71.72	4
Yevhen Vansovych	High jump	1.87	28 Q	1.80	28

Combined events – Decathlon

Athlete	Event	100 m	LJ	SP	HJ	400 m	110H	DT	PV	JT	1500 m	Final	Rank
Vladimir Volkov	Result	11.49	7.09	12.62	1.75	51.2	15.8	38.04	3.80	56.68	4:33.2	6674	4
Vladimir Volkov	Points	768	815	637	711	758	632	573	645	660	475	6674	4
Sergey Kuznetsov	Result	11.56	7.09	11.71	1.65	52.8	16.4	41.04	3.60	43.19	4:42.0	5937	10
Sergey Kuznetsov	Points	768	815	556	605	654	523	656	556	408	396	5937	10
Pyotr Kozhevnikov	Result	11.60	5.80	Did not finish									
Pyotr Kozhevnikov	Points	768	466	Did not finish									

Women
Track & road events

Athlete	Events	Heat		Quarterfinal		Semifinal		Final	
Athlete	Events	Result	Rank	Result	Rank	Result	Rank	Result	Rank
Anna Aleksandrova	80 m hurdles	11.86	3	—N/a		Did not advance			
Elene Gokieli	80 m hurdles	11.59	1 Q	—N/a		11.46 w	4	Did not advance	
Maria Golubnichaya	80 m hurdles	11.29	1 Q	—N/a		11.35	1 Q	11.24	2nd place, silver medalist(s)
Vera Kalashnikova	100 m	12.32	2 Q	12.26	2 Q	12.41	5	Did not advance	
Flora Kazantseva	200 m	25.92	5	—N/a		Did not advance			
Nadezhda Khnykina	100 m	12.25	2 Q	12.29	1 Q	12.17	4	Did not advance	
Nadezhda Khnykina	200 m	24.47 WR	1 Q	—N/a		24.16	1 Q	24.37	3rd place, bronze medalist(s)
Yevgeniya Sechenova	200 m	25.46	1 Q	—N/a		25.32	5	Did not advance	
Irina Turova	100 m	12.25	2 Q	12.28	4	Did not advance			
Nadezhda Khnykina; Vera Kalashnikova; Irina Turova; Yevgeniya Sechenova	4 × 100 m relay	47.01	2 Q	—N/a				46.42	4

Field events

Athlete	Event	Qualification		Final	
Athlete	Event	Distance	Position	Distance	Position
Yelisaveta Bagriantseva	Discus throw	40.73	6 Q	47.08	2nd place, silver medalist(s)
Aleksandra Chudina	Long jump	5.77	3 Q	6.14	2nd place, silver medalist(s)
Aleksandra Chudina	High jump	—N/a		1.63	3rd place, bronze medalist(s)
Aleksandra Chudina	Javelin throw	46.17 OR	1 Q	50.01	2nd place, silver medalist(s)
Nina Dumbadze	Discus throw	43.20	2 Q	46.29	3rd place, bronze medalist(s)
Galina Ganeker	High jump	—N/a		1.55	11
Yelena Gorchakova	Javelin throw	45.18	4 Q	49.76	3rd place, bronze medalist(s)
Nina Kossova	High jump	—N/a		1.58	7
Valentina Lituyeva	Long jump	5.51	13 Q	5.65	11
Nina Romashkova	Discus throw	45.05	1 Q	51.42 OR	1st place, gold medalist(s)
Klavdiya Tochonova	Shot put	13.88 OR	1 Q	14.50	3rd place, bronze medalist(s)
Tamara Tyshkevich	Shot put	12.76	8 Q	14.42	4
Nina Tyurkina	Long jump	5.77	4 Q	5.81	6
Galina Zybina	Shot put	13.66	3 Q	15.28 WR	1st place, gold medalist(s)
Galina Zybina	Javelin throw	45.95	2 Q	48.35	4

== Basketball ==
Men's team competition

- Main round (Group B)

- Defeated Bulgaria (74–46)
- Defeated Finland (47–35)
- Defeated Mexico (71–62)

- Final round (Group B)

- Lost to United States (58–86)
- Defeated Brazil (54–49)
- Defeated Chile (78–60)

- Semifinals

- Defeated Uruguay (61–57)

- Final

- Lost to United States (25–36) → silver medal

- Team roster

- Stepas Brutautas
- Nodar Dzhordzhikiya
- Anatoly Konev
- Otar Korkiya
- Heino Kruus
- Ilmar Kullam
- Justinas Lagunavičius
- Joann Lõssov
- Aleksandr Moiseyev
- Yuri Ozerov
- Kazys Petkevičius
- Stasys Stonkus
- Maigonis Valdmanis
- Viktor Vlasov

== Boxing ==
Athlete	Event	Round of 32	Round of 16	Quarterfinals	Semifinals	Final	
Athlete	Event	Opposition Result	Opposition Result	Opposition Result	Opposition Result	Opposition Result	Rank
Anatoli Bulakov	Flyweight	van der Zee (NED); W 3–0	Pozzali (ITA); W 3–0	Dower (GBR); W 2–1	Basel (GER); L 1–2	Did not advance	3rd place, bronze medalist(s)
Gennady Garbuzov	Bantamweight	Renard (FRA); W 2–1	Macías (MEX); W 3–0	Majdloch (TCH); W 3–0	Hämäläinen (FIN); L 0–3	Did not advance	3rd place, bronze medalist(s)
Yury Sokolov	Featherweight	Ventaja (FRA); L 1–2	Did not advance				
Aleksandr Zasukhin	Lightweight	Ferrer (FRA); W 2–1	Reardon (GBR); L 0–3	Did not advance			
Viktor Mednov	Light-welterweight	Jones (AUS); W TKO 2 R	Ambruș (ROU); W injured	Weissmann (FRA); W 3–0	Mallenius (FIN); W W/O	Adkins (USA); L 1–2	2nd place, silver medalist(s)
Sergei Scherbakov	Welterweight	Sarfatti (ARG); W Disq	van der Linde (RSA); W KO 2 R	Vescovi (ITA); W 3–0	Jörgensen (DEN); W 3–0	Chychła (POL); L 0–3	2nd place, silver medalist(s)
Boris Tishin	Light-middleweight	BYE	Krawczyk (POL); W TKO 2 R	Cavalheiro (BRA); W 3–0	van Schalkwyk (RSA); L 0–3	Did not advance	3rd place, bronze medalist(s)
Boris Silchev	Middleweight	BYE	Madigan (AUS); L 1–2	Did not advance			
Algirdas Šocikas	Heavyweight	Gościański (POL); W TKO 2 R	BYE	Nieman (RSA); L KO 1 R	Did not advance		

== Cycling ==
Road competition

men's individual road race (190.4 km)

- Yevgeny Klevtsov — 5:23:34.0 (→ 40th place)
- Anatoly Kolesov — did not finish (→ no ranking)
- Nikolay Bobarenko — did not finish (→ no ranking)
- Vladimir Kryuchkov — did not finish (→ no ranking)

Track competition

Men's 1000 m time trial

- Lev Tsipursky

- Final — 1:15.2 (→ 13th place)

Men's 1000 m sprint scratch race

- Otar Dadunashvili — 13th place

== Diving ==
Men

Athlete	Event	Preliminary		Final			
Athlete	Event	Points	Rank	Points	Rank	Total	Rank
Roman Brener	3 m springboard	69.37	7 Q	96.26	5	165.63	5
Gennady Udalov	3 m springboard	65.99	13	Did not advance			
Aleksey Zhigalov	3 m springboard	71.25	6 Q	80.06	8	151.31	8
Aleksandr Bakatin	10 m platform	71.86	7 Q	55.00	8	126.86	7
Roman Brener	10 m platform	71.01	8 Q	55.30	7	126.31	8
Mikhail Chachba	10 m platform	65.02	17	Did not advance			

Women

Athlete	Event	Preliminary		Final			
Athlete	Event	Points	Rank	Points	Rank	Total	Rank
Valentina Chumicheva	3 m springboard	52.15	10	Did not advance			
Ninel Krutova	3 m springboard	56.18	4 Q	60.68	4	116.86	4
Lyubov Zhigalova	3 m springboard	54.18	7 Q	59.65	5	113.83	6
Yevgeniya Bogdanovskaya	10 m platform	40.67	8 Q	16.83	8	57.50	8
Ninel Krutova	10 m platform	32.35	14	Did not advance			
Tatyana Vereina	10 m platform	43.26	5 Q	17.83	6	61.09	6

== Equestrian ==
Dressage

Athlete	Horse	Event	Points	Rank
Vladimir Raspopov	Imeninnik	Individual	433.5	19
Vasily Tikhonov	Pevec	Individual	395.0	24
Nikolay Sitko	Cesar	Individual	377.0	25
Vladimir Raspopov; Vasily Tikhonov; Nikolay Sitko	See above	Team	1205.5	7

Eventing

Athlete	Horse	Event	Penalties	Rank
Valerian Kuybyshev	Perekop	Individual	84.00	10
Boris Lilov	Zagib	Individual	Did not finish	—
Yury Andreyev	Logovoj	Individual	Did not finish	
Valerian Kuybyshev; Boris Lilov; Yury Andreyev	See above	Team	Did not finish	—

Jumping

Athlete	Horse	Event	Penalties	Rank
Mikhail Vlasov	Rota	Individual	56.00	43
Nikolay Shelenkov	Atiger	Individual	62.50	46
Gavriil Budyonny	Yeger	Individual	83.25	47
Mikhail Vlasov; Nikolay Shelenkov; Gavriil Budyonny	See above	Team	201.75	14

== Fencing ==
16 fencers, 13 men and 3 women, represented the Soviet Union in 1952.

Men

Athlete	Event	First round		Second round		Semifinal		Final	
Athlete	Event	Opposition	Rank	Opposition Score	Rank	Opposition Score	Rank	Opposition Score	Rank
German Bokun	Individual foil	Magnusson (SWE); Galimi (ARG); Raym. Paul (GBR); Lund (AUS); Kavanagh (VEN); Asselin (CAN)	2 Q (W 4 — L 1)	Lataste (FRA); Palócz (HUN); Verhalle (BEL); Bukantzr (USA); Klette (NOR); Vîlcea (ROU)	5 (W 2 — L 4)	Did not advance			
Mark Midler	Individual foil	Chelaru (ROU); Lubell (USA); Ramos (MEX); Bach (SAA); Rimini (URU); Gutiérrez (VEN)	4 Q (W 3 — L 1)	Di Rosa (ITA); Dessouki (EGY); Eriksson (SWE); Twardokens (POL); Raym. Paul (GBR)	6 (W 0 — L 4)	Did not advance			
Yulen Uralov	Individual foil	Valcke (BEL); Bukantz (USA); Pawłowski (POL); Raitio (FIN); Knödler (SAA); Menéndez (CUB)	2 Q (W 4 — L 1)	René Paul (GBR) d'Oriola (FRA); Tilli (HUN); Ballister (BEL); Casmir (GER); Ramos (MEX)	4 (W 4 — L 2)	Did not advance			
Ivan Komarov; German Bokun; Yulen Uralov; Mark Midler	Team foil	Argentina; L 8–8; Egypt; L 4–9	3 (W 0 — L 2)	Did not advance					
Yury Deksbakh	Individual épéel	Rerrich (HUN); Jay (GBR); Pekelman (BRA); Rydz (POL); Chelaru (ROU); Bertorelli (VEN); Duffy (IRL)	5 (W 3 — L 4)	Did not advance					
Lev Saychuk	Individual épéel	Pinto (POR); Nigon (FRA); Parfitt (GBR); Kearney (IRL); Soberón (GUA) de Paula (BRA); Raitio (FIN)	7 (W 2 — L 5)	Did not advance					
Juozas Ūdras	Individual épéel	Lund (AUS); Dybkær (DEN) von Koss (NOR); Delaunois (BEL); Mouyal (FRA); Rettberg (ARG); Menéndez (CUB)	8 (W 1 — L 6)	Did not advance					
Genrikh Bulgakov; Juozas Ūdras; Lev Saychuk; Yury Deksbakh; Ak'ak'i Meipariani	Team épée	United States; L 8–8; Italy; L 4–8	3 (W 0 — L 2)	Did not advance					
Boris Belyakov	Individual sabre	Ballister (BEL); Anderson (GBR); Sande (ARG); Ramos (MEX); Eriksen (NOR); Ferreira (POR)	2 Q (W 4 — L 1)	Berczelly (HUN); Lechner (AUT); Tudor (ROU); Heywaert (BEL); Tournon (FRA); Greter (SUI); Carnera (DEN)	5 (W 3 — L 4)	Did not advance			
Lev Kuznetsov	Individual sabre	Frey (DEN); Greter (SUI); Abdel Rahman (EGY); Eriksson (SWE); Silva (POR); Maki (JPN); Porebski (GBR)	3 Q (W 5 — L 1)	Kovács (HUN); Plattner (AUT); Ballister (BEL); Gurath (ROU); Worth (USA); Zabłocki (POL); Pomini (ARG)	6 (W 3 — L 4)	Did not advance			
Ivan Manayenko	Individual sabre	Heywaert (BEL); Pawłowski (POL); Carnera (DEN); Rau (SAA); Fethers (AUS); Cámara (MEX); Gutiérrez (VEN)	2 Q (W 5 — L 1)	Gerevich (HUN); Suski (POL); Nostini (ITA); Frey (DEN); Haro (MEX); D'Andrea (ARG); Kwartler (USA)	3 Q (W 5 — L 2)	Darè (ITA); Gerevich (HUN); Lechner (AUT); Sande (ARG) de Capriles (USA); Tudor (ROU)	4 (W 2 — L 3)	Did not advance	
Ivan Manayenko; Mark Midler; Vladimir Vyshpolsky; Lev Kuznetsov; Boris Belyakov	Team sabre	Germany; L 7–9; Belgium; L 2–9	3 (W 0 — L 2)	Did not advance					

Women

Athlete	Event	First round		Second round		Semifinal		Final	
Athlete	Event	Opposition	Rank	Opposition Score	Rank	Opposition Score	Rank	Opposition Score	Rank
Appolinariya Plekhanova	Individual foil	York (USA); Lecomte-Guyonneau (FRA); Müller-Preis (AUT); Pym (AUS); Mattsson (FIN)	4 Q (W 2 — L 2)	Nyári (HUN); Allgayer (GER); Strukel (ITA); Drand (FRA); Buller (GBR)	1 Q (W 5 — L 0)	Elek (HUN); Garilhe (FRA); Mitchell (USA); Camber (ITA); Glen-Haig (GBR); Allgayer (GER); Filz (AUT)	8 (W 1 — L 6)	Did not advance	
Anna Ponomaryova	Individual foil	Kunz (AUT); Nyári (HUN); Mitchell (USA); Poulsen (DEN); Norford (AUS)	2 Q (W 4 — L 1)	Lachmann (DEN); Mitchell (USA); Filz (AUT); Lecomte-Guyonneau (FRA); Elek (HUN)	6 (W 2 — L 3)	Did not advance			
Nadezhda Shitikova	Individual foil	Lachmann (DEN); Camber (ITA); Buller (GBR); Kalka (FIN); Selle (VEN); Włodarczyk (POL)	4 Q (W 3 — L 3)	Elek (HUN); Camber (ITA); Craus (USA); Kunz (AUT); Sheen (GBR)	5 (W 1 — L 4)	Did not advance			

== Football ==
Preliminary round

15 July 1952
19:00

Soviet Union	2–1 (a.e.t.)	Bulgaria
Bobrov 100'; Trofimov 104'	Report	Kolev 95'

Kotkan Urheilukeskus, Kotka
Attendance: 10,637
Referee: Istvan Zsolt (HUN)

1/8 finals

20 July 1952
19:00

Yugoslavia	5–5 (a.e.t.)	Soviet Union
Mitić 29'; Ognjanov 33'; Zebec 44', 59'; Bobek 46'	Report	Bobrov 53', 77', 87'; Trofimov 75'; Petrov 89'

Ratina Stadion, Tampere
Attendance: 17,000
Referee: Arthur Ellis (GBR)

22 July 1952
19:00

Yugoslavia	3–1	Soviet Union
Mitić 19'; Bobek 29' (pen.); Čajkovski 54'	Report	Bobrov 6'

Ratina Stadion, Tampere
Attendance: 16,916
Referee: Arthur Ellis (GBR)
- Team roster

- Leonid Ivanov
- Konstantin Krizhevsky
- Anatoli Bashashkin
- Avtandil Chkuaseli
- Yury Nyrkov
- Anatoly Ilyin
- Fridrikh Maryutin
- Igor Netto
- Valentin Nikolayev
- Vasily Trofimov
- Vsevolod Bobrov
- Aleksandr Tenyagin
- Avtandil Gogoberidze
- Konstantin Beskov
- Aleksandr Petrov
- Agustín Gómez

== Gymnastics ==
Men
Individual

Athlete	Apparatus																								Total	Rank
Athlete	Floor				Rings				Pommel horse				Vault				Parallel bars				Horizontal bar				Total	Rank
Athlete	Comp.	Vol.	Total	R	Comp.	Vol.	Total	R	Comp.	Vol.	Total	R	Comp.	Vol.	Total	R	Comp.	Vol.	Total	R	Comp.	Vol.	Total	R	Total	Rank
Viktor Chukarin	8.65	9.80	18.45	29	9.65	9.90	19.55	2nd place, silver medalist(s)	9.70	9.80	19.50	1st place, gold medalist(s)	9.45	9.75	19.20	1st place, gold medalist(s)	9.80	9.80	19.60	2nd place, silver medalist(s)	9.60	9.80	19.40	5	115.70	1st place, gold medalist(s)
Hrant Shahinyan	9.30	9.60	18.90	8	9.80	9.95	19.75	1st place, gold medalist(s)	9.90	9.50	19.40	2nd place, silver medalist(s)	9.05	9.45	18.50	35	9.50	9.85	19.35	4	9.45	9.60	19.05	14	114.95	2nd place, silver medalist(s)
Valentin Muratov	9.35	9.50	18.85	11	9.45	9.90	19.35	5	9.70	8.60	18.30	32	9.25	9.45	18.70	19	9.55	9.70	19.25	8	9.65	9.55	19.20	9	113.65	4
Yevgeny Korolkov	9.00	9.30	18.30	35	9.45	9.70	19.15	7	9.75	9.65	19.40	2nd place, silver medalist(s)	8.90	9.50	18.40	44	9.50	9.80	19.30	5	9.35	9.45	18.80	23	113.35	6
Vladimir Belyakov	9.25	9.50	18.75	14	9.25	9.70	18.95	14	9.60	9.50	19.10	7	9.10	9.40	18.50	35	9.45	9.80	19.25	8	9.25	9.55	18.80	23	113.35	6
Iosif Berdiev	9.25	9.40	18.65	19	9.50	9.60	19.10	11	9.55	9.25	18.80	15	9.30	9.60	18.90	7	9.45	9.70	19.15	11	9.20	9.30	18.50	38	113.10	10
Mikhail Perlman	8.70	9.45	18.15	41	9.35	9.70	19.05	13	9.70	9.60	19.30	4	9.05	9.25	18.30	65	9.25	9.75	19.00	15	9.30	9.40	18.70	29	112.50	11
Dmytro Leonkin	8.95	9.55	18.50	27	9.55	9.85	19.40	3rd place, bronze medalist(s)	3.75	8.35	12.10	164	9.20	9.50	18.70	19	7.10	9.60	16.70	127	9.05	9.30	18.35	43	103.75	78

Team

Athlete	Apparatus (best 5 scores)																								Total	Rank
Athlete	Floor				Rings				Pommel horse				Vault				Parallel bars				Horizontal bar				Total	Rank
Athlete	Comp.	Vol.	Total	R	Comp.	Vol.	Total	R	Comp.	Vol.	Total	R	Comp.	Vol.	Total	R	Comp.	Vol.	Total	R	Comp.	Vol.	Total	R	Total	Rank
Viktor Chukarin; Hrant Shahinyan; Valentin Muratov; Yevgeny Korolkov; Vladimir Belyakov; Iosif Berdiev; Mikhail Perlman; Dmytro Leonkin	46.15	47.95	94.10	2	47.95	49.30	97.25	1	48.75	48.05	96.80	1	46.30	47.80	94.10	2	47.80	49.00	96.80	1	47.35	47.95	95.30	4	574.40	1st place, gold medalist(s)

Women
Individual

Athlete	Apparatus																Total	Rank
Athlete	Floor				Balance beam				Uneven bars				Vault				Total	Rank
Athlete	Comp.	Vol.	Total	R	Comp.	Vol.	Total	R	Comp.	Vol.	Total	R	Comp.	Vol.	Total	R	Total	Rank
Maria Gorokhovskaya	9.50	9.70	19.20	2nd place, silver medalist(s)	9.43	9.70	19.13	2nd place, silver medalist(s)	9.63	9.63	19.26	2nd place, silver medalist(s)	9.63	9.56	19.19	2nd place, silver medalist(s)	76.78	1st place, gold medalist(s)
Nina Bocharova	9.40	9.30	18.70	10	9.46	9.76	19.22	1st place, gold medalist(s)	9.56	9.43	18.99	4	9.80	9.23	19.03	6	75.94	2nd place, silver medalist(s)
Galina Minaicheva	9.36	9.60	18.96	6	9.13	9.53	18.66	10	9.36	9.53	18.89	8	9.73	9.43	19.16	3rd place, bronze medalist(s)	75.67	4
Galina Urbanovich	9.43	9.56	18.99	4	9.40	9.53	18.93	5	9.16	9.46	18.62	12	9.70	9.40	19.10	5	75.64	5
Pelageya Danilova	9.23	9.43	18.66	11	9.26	9.50	18.76	9	9.43	9.56	18.99	7	9.46	9.16	18.62	12	75.03	7
Galina Shamrai	9.23	9.63	18.86	8	9.43	9.36	18.79	8	9.33	9.60	18.93	7	9.03	9.36	18.39	23	74.97	8
Medeya Jugeli	9.30	9.30	18.60	12	9.13	9.36	18.49	15	9.23	9.50	18.73	9	9.73	9.40	19.13	4	74.95	9
Ekaterina Kalinchuk	8.83	8.90	17.73	45	8.96	9.36	18.32	18	9.30	9.36	18.66	10	9.70	9.50	19.20	1st place, gold medalist(s)	73.91	13

Team

Athlete	Event	Team exercise with portable apparatus	Rank	Best six individual apparatus scores	Rank	Total	Rank
Maria Gorokhovskaya; Nina Bocharova; Galina Minaicheva; Galina Urbanovich; Pelageya Danilova; Galina Shamrai; Medeya Jugeli; Ekaterina Kalinchuk	Team	73.00	2nd place, silver medalist(s)	454.03	1	527.03	1st place, gold medalist(s)

== Modern pentathlon ==
Three male pentathletes represented the Soviet Union in 1952.

Athlete	Event	Riding				Fencing			Shooting			Swimming		Running		Total points	Final rank
Athlete	Event	Time	Penalty	Points	Placing Points	Wins	Ties	Placing Points	Hits	Points	Placing Points	Time	Placing Points	Time	Placing Points	Total points	Final rank
Igor Novikov	Individual	10:41.0	4.5	95.5	24	25	8	13	20	187	4	4:16.9	4	15:11.6	10	55	4
Pavel Rakityansky	Individual	10:13.5	3	97	19	21	9	28	19	173	34	5:04.6	29	15:15.4	13	123	23
Aleksandr Dekhayev	Individual	11:27.2	37	63	36	20	11	30	13	121	50	4:23.7	6	15:06.3	7	129	28
Igor Novikov; Pavel Rakityansky; Aleksandr Dekhayev	Team				76			69			81		37		30	293	5

== Rowing ==
The Soviet Union had 26 male rowers participate in all seven rowing events in 1952.

Men's single sculls

- Yuriy Tyukalov — 8:12.8 → (gold) gold medal

Men's double sculls

- Heorhiy Zhylin, Ihor Yemchuk — 7:38.3 → (silver) silver medal

Men's coxless pair

- Mikhail Plaksin, Vasily Bagretsov — 2 h1 repêchage (→ did not advance)

Men's coxed pair

- Yevgeny Morozov, Viktor Shevchenko, Mikhail Prudnikov — 3 h1 r4/5 (→ did not advance)

Men's coxless four

- Roman Zakharov, Yury Rogozov, Ivan Makarov, Vladimir Kirsanov — 2 h1 r4/5 (→ did not advance)

Men's coxed four

- Kirill Putyrsky, Yevgeny Tretnikov, Georgy Gushchenko, Boris Fyodorov, Boris Brechko — 2 h1 r4/5 (→ did not advance)

Men's eight

- Yevgeny Brago, Vladimir Rodimushkin, Aleksey Komarov, Igor Borisov, Slava Amiragov, Leonid Gissen, Yevgeny Samsonov, Vladimir Kryukov, Igor Polyakov — 6:31.2 → (silver) silver medal

== Shooting ==
Men

Athlete	Event	Points	Rank
Boris Andreyev	50 m rifle prone	400	2nd place, silver medalist(s)
Boris Andreyev	50 m rifle three positions	1163	3rd place, bronze medalist(s)
Pyotr Avilov	50 m rifle prone	395	24
Pyotr Avilov	50 m rifle three positions	1162	5
Anatoli Bogdanov	300 m rifle three positions	1123 WR	1st place, gold medalist(s)
Vasily Frolov	25 m rapid fire pistol	573	8
Ivan Isayev	Trap	185	10
Konstantin Martazov	50 m pistol	546	4
Yury Nikandrov	Trap	183	15
Pyotr Nikolayev	100 m running deer	385	7
Vasily Novikov	25 m rapid fire pistol	569	11
Vladimir Sevryugin	100 m running deer	383	8
Lev Vainshtein	50 m pistol	546	5
Lev Vainshtein	300 m rifle three positions	1109	3rd place, bronze medalist(s)

== Swimming ==
Men

Ranks given are within the heat.

Athlete	Event	Heat		Semifinal		Final	
Athlete	Event	Time	Rank	Time	Rank	Time	Rank
Lev Balandin	100 m freestyle	58.9	2 Q	58.8	4	Did not advance	
Endel Edasi	100 m freestyle	1:00.1	3 Q	59.8	7	Did not advance	
Vladimir Skomarovsky	100 m freestyle	1:00.0	3 Q	1:01.1	8	Did not advance	
Viktor Drobinsky	400 m freestyle	4:56.5	2	Did not advance			
Anatoly Raznochintsev	400 m freestyle	4:56.8	3	Did not advance			
Vladimir Lavrinenko	1500 m freestyle	20:07.8	5	—N/a		Did not advance	
Endel Press	1500 m freestyle	20:11.7	4	—N/a		Did not advance	
Vladimir Lopatin	100 m backstroke	1:10.8	5	Did not advance			
Leonid Sagayduk	100 m backstroke	1:11.4	4	Did not advance			
Viktor Solovyov	100 m backstroke	1:09.5	2 Q	1:09.6	5	Did not advance	
Vladimir Borisenko	200 m breaststroke	2:43.2	3 Q	2:46.2	8	Did not advance	
Yury Kurchashov	200 m breaststroke	2:47.3	6	Did not advance			
Pyotr Skripchenkov	200 m breaststroke	2:47.3	4	Did not advance			
Viktor Drobinsky; Vasily Karmanov; Leonid Meshkov; Lev Balandin	4 × 200 m freestyle	9:01.9	4	—N/a		Did not advance	

Women

Ranks given are within the heat.

Athlete	Event	Heat		Semifinal		Final	
Athlete	Event	Time	Rank	Time	Rank	Time	Rank
Mariya Havrysh	200 m breaststroke	3:01.6	4 Q	2:58.6	3 Q	2:58.9	6
Vera Kostina	200 m breaststroke	3:07.3	4	Did not advance			
Roza Zenziveyeva	200 m breaststroke	3:10.5	4	Did not advance			

== Water polo ==
Men's team competition

- Qualifying round

- Lost to Netherlands (2–3)
- Defeated India (12–0)

- Preliminary round (Group B)

- Lost to Hungary (3–5)
- Defeated Egypt (3–2)
- Defeated Germany (6–2)

- Semi-final round (Group B)

- Drew with Yugoslavia (3–3)
- Lost to Netherlands (2–4)

- Classification round (5–8)

- Defeated Spain (4–2)
- Drew with Belgium (3–3) → 7th place

- Team roster

- Boris Goikhman
- Evgeny Semyonov
- Yury Teplov
- Lev Kokorin
- Valentin Prokopov
- Aleksandr Liferenko
- Pyotr Mshvenieradze
- Yury Shlyapin
- Vitaly Ushakov
- Anatoly Yegorov

== Weightlifting ==
Men

Athlete	Event	Press		Snatch		Clean & jerk		Total	Rank
Athlete	Event	Result	Rank	Result	Rank	Result	Rank	Total	Rank
Ivan Udodov	−56 kg	90.0	4	97.5 OR	1	127.5 OR	1	315.0 WR	1st place, gold medalist(s)
Rafael Chimishkyan	−60 kg	97.5	3	105.0	1	135.0	1	337.5 WR	1st place, gold medalist(s)
Nikolay Saksonov	−60 kg	95.0	4	105.0	2	132.5	2	332.5	2nd place, silver medalist(s)
Yevgeny Lopatin	−67.5 kg	100.0	7	107.5	4	142.5	1	350.0	2nd place, silver medalist(s)
Trofim Lomakin	−82.5 kg	125.0	3	127.5	1	165.0 OR	1	417.5	1st place, gold medalist(s)
Arkady Vorobyov	−82.5 kg	120.0	6	127.5	1	160.0	3	407.5	3rd place, bronze medalist(s)
Grigory Novak	−90 kg	140.0 OR	1	125.0	2	145.0	9	410.0	2nd place, silver medalist(s)

== Wrestling ==
Men's freestyle

Athlete	Event	First round	Second round	Third round	Fourth round	Fifth round	Final rounds	Rank
Athlete	Event	Opposition Result	Opposition Result	Opposition Result	Opposition Result	Opposition Result	Opposition Result	Rank
Georgy Sayadov	−52 kg	Sigiran (FRA); W 3–0	Mewis (BEL); W 3–0	Peery (USA); W 3–0	Weber (GER); W 3–0	Mollaghasemi (IRI); L 1–2	Did not advance	4
Rashid Mammadbeyov	−57 kg	Yaghoubi (IRI); W 0:32 ^{VT}	Hänni (SUI); W w/o	Borders (USA); W 10:40 ^{VT}	Bencze (HUN); L 1–2	Jadhav (IND); W 3–0	Ishii (JPN); L 0–3	2nd place, silver medalist(s)
Ibrahim Dadashov	−62 kg	Essawi (EGY); W 1:37 ^{VT}	Şit (TUR); L 0–3	Bielle (FRA); W 3–0	Henson (USA); L 1–2	Did not advance		
Armenak Yaltyryan	−67 kg	Anderberg (SWE); L 14:06 ^{VT}	Talosela (FIN); W 13:10 ^{VT}	Østrand (DEN); W 3–0	BYE	Tofigh (IRI); L 0–3	Did not advance	4
Vasyl Rybalko	−73 kg	Islioğlu (TUR); L 1–2	Mojtabavi (IRI); L 1–2	Did not advance				
David Tsimakuridze	−79 kg	Lindblad (SWE); L 1–2	Hodge (USA); W 5:58 ^{VT}	Hussain (EGY); W 4:55 ^{VT}	BYE	Gurics (HUN); W 3–0	Takhti (IRI); W 2–1	1st place, gold medalist(s)
August Englas	−87 kg	Atan (TUR); W 3–0	Jadhav (IND); W 0:58 ^{VT}	Leichter (GER); W 3:47 ^{VT}	Wittenberg (USA); L 0–3	Palm (SWE); L 1–2	Did not advance	4
Arsen Mekokishvili	+87 kg	Kovács (HUN); W 6:05 ^{VT}	Waltner (GER); W 3–0	Richmond (GBR); W 2–1	Vecchi (ITA); W 4:10 ^{VT}	Antonsson (SWE); W 2–1	BYE	1st place, gold medalist(s)

Men's Greco-Roman

Athlete	Event	First round	Second round	Third round	Fourth round	Fifth round	Final rounds	Rank
Athlete	Event	Opposition Result	Opposition Result	Opposition Result	Opposition Result	Opposition Result	Opposition Result	Rank
Boris Gurevich	−52 kg	Vukov (YUG); W 3–0	Thomsen (DEN); W 4:52 ^{VT}	Kenéz (HUN); W 3–0	Mewis (BEL); W 3–0	Honkala (FIN); W 3–0	Fabra (ITA); W 3–0	1st place, gold medalist(s)
Artem Teryan	−57 kg	Toboła (POL); W 4:53 ^{VT}	Demirsüren (TUR); W 3–0	Lombardi (ITA); W 3–0	Popescu (ROU); W 3–0	Persson (SWE); W 3–0	Chihab (LIB); L 1–2	3rd place, bronze medalist(s)
Artem Teryan	−57 kg	Toboła (POL); W 4:53 ^{VT}	Demirsüren (TUR); W 3–0	Lombardi (ITA); W 3–0	Popescu (ROU); W 3–0	Persson (SWE); W 3–0	Hódos (HUN); W 3–0	3rd place, bronze medalist(s)
Yakov Punkin	−62 kg	Merle (FRA); W 11:17 ^{VT}	BYE	Taha (LIB); W 3–0	Bozbey (TUR); W 3–0	Polyák (HUN); W 1:26 ^{VT}	Rashed (EGY); W 3:28 ^{VT}	1st place, gold medalist(s)
Shazam Safin	−67 kg	Akbulut (TUR); W 3–0	Eriksen (NOR); W 12:35 ^{VT}	Rasmussen (DEN); W 8:15 ^{VT}	Cuc (ROU); W 3–0	Athanasov (TCH); W 2:46 ^{VT}	Freij (SWE); W 3–0	1st place, gold medalist(s)
Semyon Marushkin	−73 kg	Sekal (TCH); W 3–0	Gołaś (POL); W 3–0	Şenol (TUR); W 3–0	Andersson (SWE); L 0–3	Did not advance		4
Nikolay Belov	−79 kg	Gryt (POL); W 2:17 ^{VT}	BYE	Courtois (BEL); W w/o	Grönberg (SWE); L 0–3	BYE	Rauhala (FIN); L 0–3	3rd place, bronze medalist(s)
Shalva Chikhladze	−87 kg	Leichter (GER); W 9:22 ^{VT}	Silvestri (ITA); W 3–0	BYE	Kovács (HUN); L 0–3	Nilsson (SWE); W 2:39 ^{VT}	Gröndahl (FIN); L 1–2	2nd place, silver medalist(s)
Johannes Kotkas	+87 kg	Baarendse (BEL); W w/o	Fahlqvist (SWE); W 2:40 ^{VT}	Fantoni (ITA); W 3:41 ^{VT}	Kovanen (FIN); W 2:43 ^{VT}	BYE	Růžička (TCH); W 4:32 ^{VT}	1st place, gold medalist(s)

== Medals by republic ==
In the following table for team events number of team representatives, who received medals are counted, not "one medal for all the team", as usual. Because there were people from different republics in one team.

Rank	Nation	Gold	Silver	Bronze	Total
1	Russian SFSR	19	35	15	69
2	Ukrainian SSR	10	11	1	22
3	Georgian SSR	3	4	2	9
4	Armenian SSR	3	2	1	6
5	Estonian SSR	1	3	0	4
6	Uzbek SSR	1	1	0	2
7	Lithuanian SSR	0	4	0	4
8	Azerbaijan SSR	0	1	1	2
9	Latvian SSR	0	1	0	1
Totals (9 entries)		37	62	20	119
