= List of Olympic female artistic gymnasts for the Soviet Union =

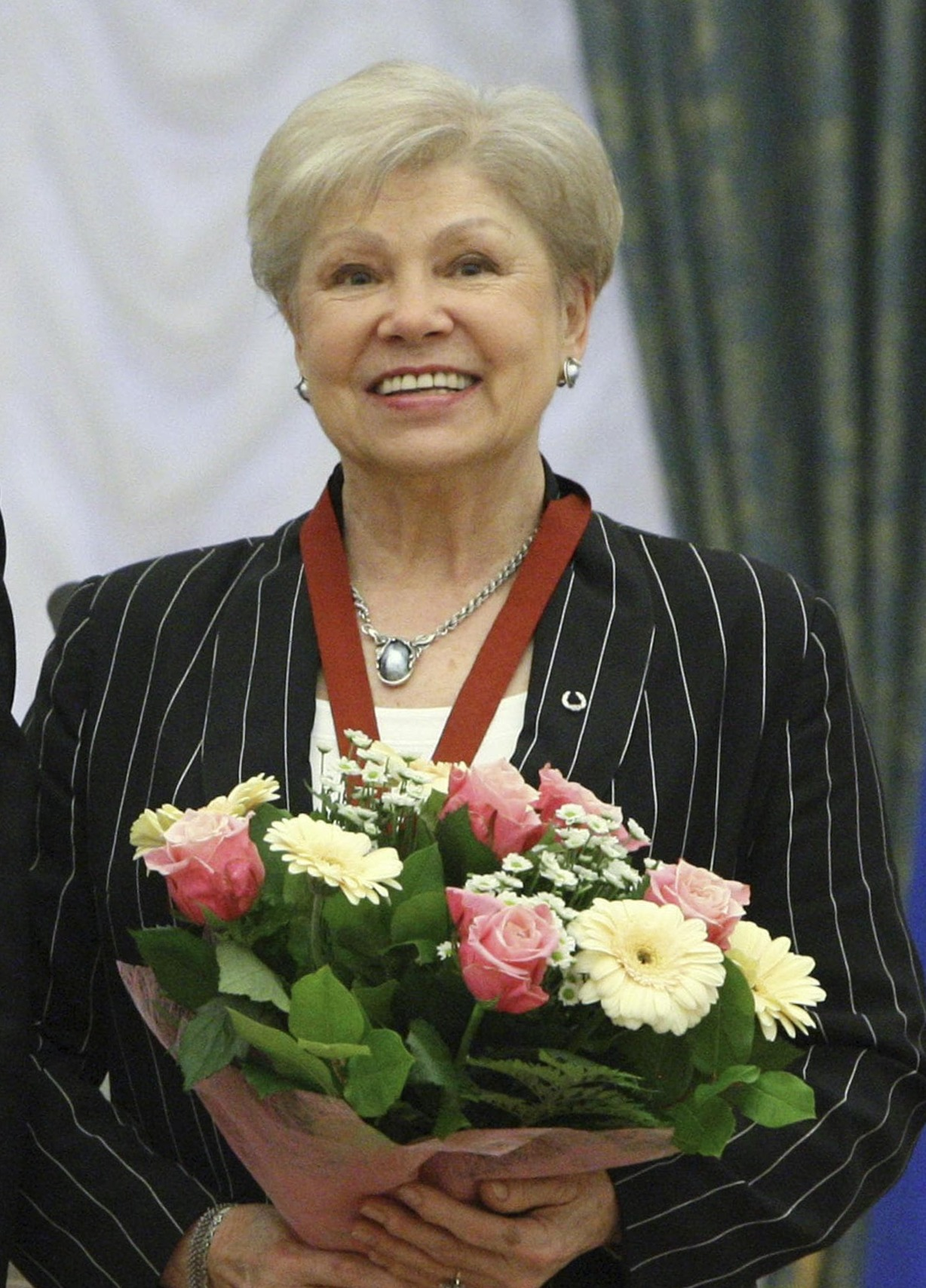
Larisa Latynina

Gymnastics events have been staged at the Olympic Games since 1896. Soviet female gymnasts participated in every Olympic Games from 1952 to 1988, except for 1984. A total of 41 female gymnasts represented the Soviet Union. Soviet women won 88 medals at the Olympics – 9 in team all-around, 2 in team portable apparatus, 18 in individual all-around, 15 in balance beam, 17 in floor exercise, 15 in vault, and 12 in uneven bars. The medals included 33 golds. The Soviet Union won the gold medal in team all-around in all nine Summer Olympics that they participated in. The Soviet Union's success might be explained by a heavy state's investment in elite sports to fulfill its political agenda on an international stage.

Eight Soviet female gymnasts won at least six medals at the Olympic Games: Larisa Latynina (18), Polina Astakhova (10), Ludmilla Tourischeva (9), Sofia Muratova (8), Maria Gorokhovskaya (7), Nellie Kim (6), Olga Korbut (6), and Tamara Manina (6).

Competing at her only Olympics in 1952, Maria Gorokhovskaya won seven medals, setting a record for the most medals ever won in a single Olympics by a woman. She won golds in team all-around and individual all-around.

Larisa Latynina competed at three Olympic Games from 1956 to 1964, and her 18 career Olympic medals is a record for any female athlete. She won six medals in each Olympics that she participated in. Nine of her medals were gold, and she won three straight floor exercise titles. Polina Astakhova also competed at the 1956, 1960, and 1964 Games. She won 10 total medals and ranks second to Latynina for the most medals among Soviet female gymnasts. Astakhova won uneven bars gold medals in 1960 and 1964.

Latynina's and Astakhova's teammates included Sofia Muratova and Tamara Manina. Muratova won eight total medals in 1956 and 1960, and Manina won six total medals in the 1956 and 1964 Games.

Ludmilla Tourischeva competed at three Olympics and won nine total medals – one in 1968, four in 1972, and four in 1976. Her golds included the 1972 individual all-around. Olga Korbut, who competed at her first Olympics in 1972, was popular with fans and the media for her daring moves. That year, she won four medals, including golds in balance beam and floor exercise. She won two more medals in 1976 and finished her career with six overall. Nellie Kim, who competed at the 1976 and 1980 Olympics, also had six total medals. She won two golds in floor exercise.

== Gymnasts ==
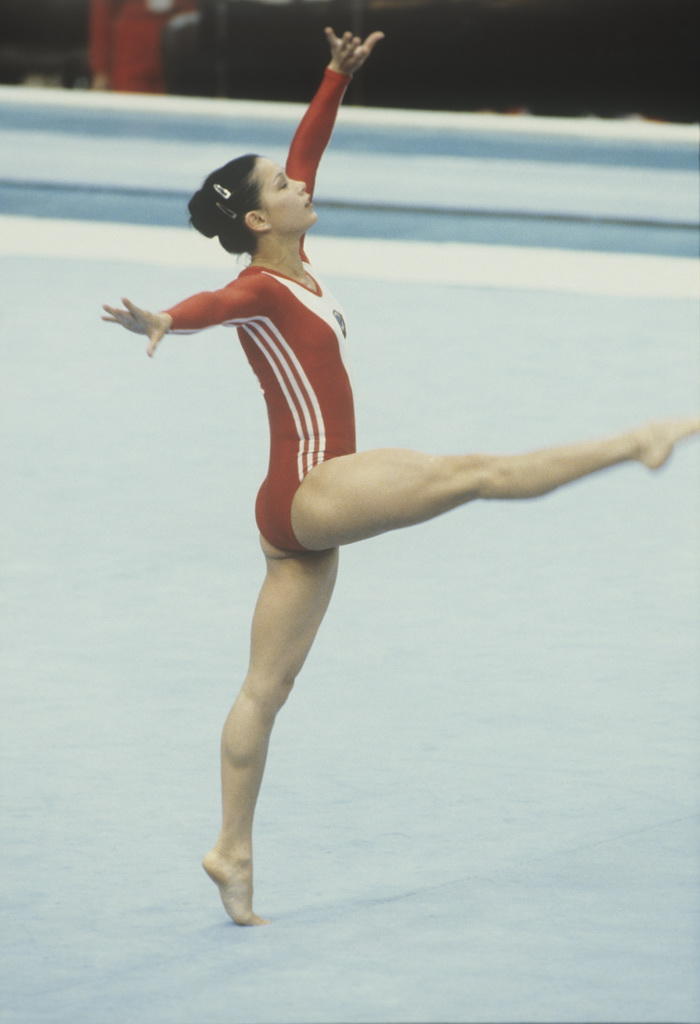
Nellie Kim

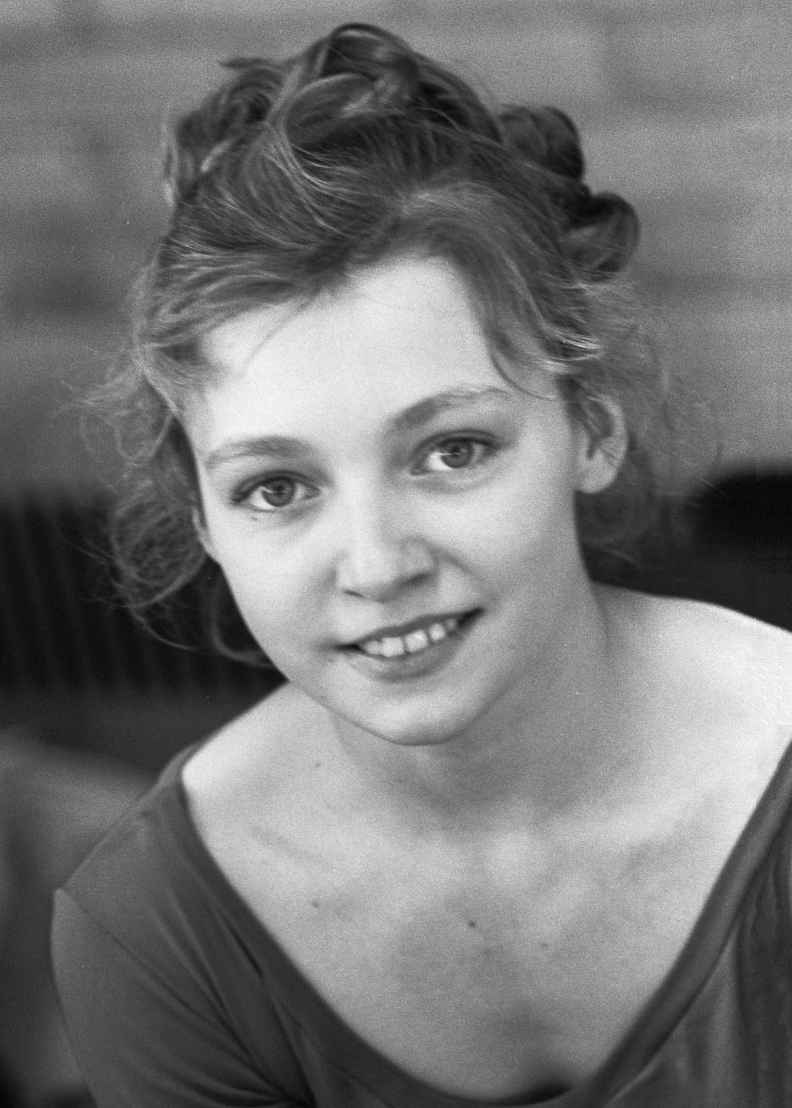
Natalia Kuchinskaya

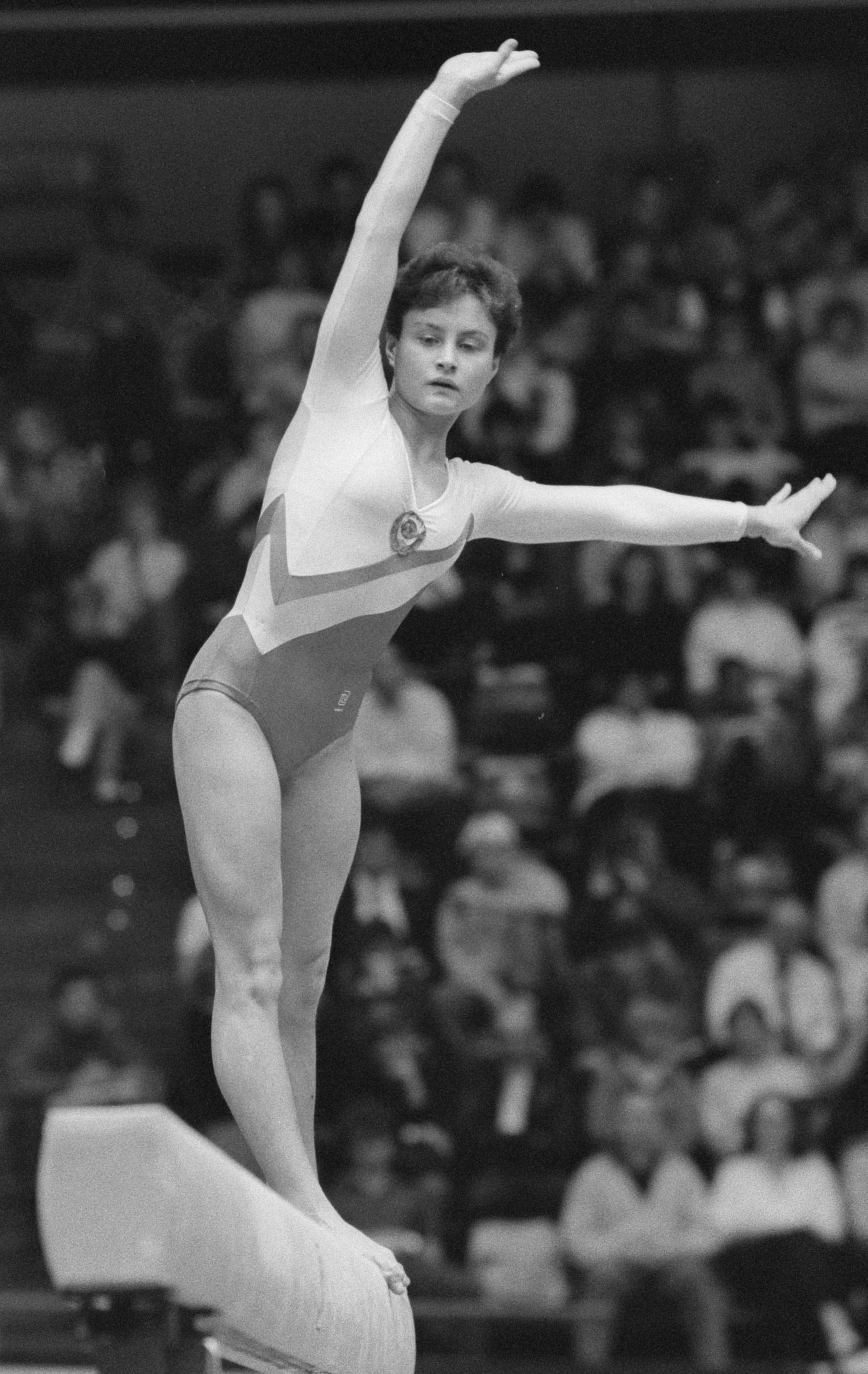
Yelena Shushunova

Gymnast	Years	Gold	Silver	Bronze	Total medals	Ref.
Polina Astakhova	1956, 1960, 1964	5	2	3	10	
Svetlana Baitova	1988	1	0	0	1	
Nina Bocharova	1952	2	2	0	4	
Svetlana Boginskaya	1988	2	1	1	4	
Lyubov Burda	1968, 1972	2	0	0	2	
Pelageya Danilova	1952	1	1	0	2	
Yelena Davydova	1980	2	1	0	3	
Maria Filatova	1976, 1980	2	0	1	3	
Maria Gorokhovskaya	1952	2	5	0	7	
Lyudmila Gromova	1964	1	0	0	1	
Svetlana Grozdova	1976	1	0	0	1	
Lidiya Ivanova	1956, 1960	2	0	1	3	
Medeya Jugeli	1952	1	1	0	2	
Ekaterina Kalinchuk	1952	2	1	0	3	
Olga Karasyova	1968	1	0	0	1	
Nellie Kim	1976, 1980	5	1	0	6	
Olga Korbut	1972, 1976	4	2	0	6	
Antonina Koshel	1972	1	0	0	1	
Natalia Kuchinskaya	1968	2	0	2	4	
Larisa Latynina	1956, 1960, 1964	9	5	4	18	
Tamara Lazakovich	1972	1	1	2	4	
Natalia Lashchenova	1988	1	0	0	1	
Tamara Manina	1956, 1964	2	3	1	6	
Galina Minaicheva	1952	1	1	1	3	
Sofia Muratova	1956, 1960	2	2	4	8	
Yelena Naimushina	1980	1	0	0	1	
Margarita Nikolaeva	1960	2	0	0	2	
Larisa Petrik	1968	2	0	1	3	
Elvira Saadi	1972, 1976	2	0	0	2	
Galina Shamrai	1952	1	1	0	2	
Natalia Shaposhnikova	1980	2	0	2	4	
Yelena Shevchenko	1988	1	0	0	1	
Yelena Shushunova	1988	2	1	1	4	
Olga Strazheva	1988	1	0	0	1	
Ludmilla Tourischeva	1968, 1972, 1976	4	3	2	9	
Galina Urbanovich	1952	1	1	0	2	
Elena Volchetskaya	1964	1	0	0	1	
Zinaida Voronina	1968	1	1	2	4	
Lyudmila Yegorova	1956	1	0	1	2	
Stella Zakharova	1980	1	0	0	1	
Tamara Zamotaylova	1960, 1964	2	0	2	4	

== Medalists ==
Medal	Name	Year	Event
Gold	Bocharova, Danilova, Gorokhovskaya, Jugeli, Kalinchuk, Minaicheva, Shamrai, Urbanovich	(Finland) 1952 Helsinki	Women's team
Silver	Bocharova, Danilova, Gorokhovskaya, Jugeli, Kalinchuk, Minaicheva, Shamrai, Urbanovich	(Finland) 1952 Helsinki	Women's team portable apparatus
Gold	Maria Gorokhovskaya	(Finland) 1952 Helsinki	Women's all-around
Silver	Nina Bocharova	(Finland) 1952 Helsinki	Women's all-around
Gold	Ekaterina Kalinchuk	(Finland) 1952 Helsinki	Women's vault
Silver	Maria Gorokhovskaya	(Finland) 1952 Helsinki	Women's vault
Bronze	Galina Minaicheva	(Finland) 1952 Helsinki	Women's vault
Silver	Maria Gorokhovskaya	(Finland) 1952 Helsinki	Women's uneven bars
Gold	Nina Bocharova	(Finland) 1952 Helsinki	Women's balance beam
Silver	Maria Gorokhovskaya	(Finland) 1952 Helsinki	Women's balance beam
Silver	Maria Gorokhovskaya	(Finland) 1952 Helsinki	Women's floor exercise
Gold	Astakhova, Yegorova, Kalinina, Latynina, Manina, Muratova	(Australia) 1956 Melbourne	Women's team
Bronze	Astakhova, Yegorova, Kalinina, Latynina, Manina, Muratova	(Australia) 1956 Melbourne	Women's team portable apparatus
Gold	Larisa Latynina	(Australia) 1956 Melbourne	Women's all-around
Bronze	Sofia Muratova	(Australia) 1956 Melbourne	Women's all-around
Gold	Larisa Latynina	(Australia) 1956 Melbourne	Women's vault
Silver	Tamara Manina	(Australia) 1956 Melbourne	Women's vault
Silver	Larisa Latynina	(Australia) 1956 Melbourne	Women's uneven bars
Bronze	Sofia Muratova	(Australia) 1956 Melbourne	Women's uneven bars
Silver	Tamara Manina	(Australia) 1956 Melbourne	Women's balance beam
Gold	Larisa Latynina	(Australia) 1956 Melbourne	Women's floor exercise
Gold	Astakhova, Ivanova, Latynina, Lyukhina, Muratova, Nikolaeva	(Italy) 1960 Rome	Women's team
Gold	Larisa Latynina	(Italy) 1960 Rome	Women's all-around
Silver	Sofia Muratova	(Italy) 1960 Rome	Women's all-around
Bronze	Polina Astakhova	(Italy) 1960 Rome	Women's all-around
Gold	Margarita Nikolaeva	(Italy) 1960 Rome	Women's vault
Silver	Sofia Muratova	(Italy) 1960 Rome	Women's vault
Bronze	Larisa Latynina	(Italy) 1960 Rome	Women's vault
Gold	Polina Astakhova	(Italy) 1960 Rome	Women's uneven bars
Silver	Larisa Latynina	(Italy) 1960 Rome	Women's uneven bars
Bronze	Tamara Lyukhina	(Italy) 1960 Rome	Women's uneven bars
Silver	Larisa Latynina	(Italy) 1960 Rome	Women's balance beam
Bronze	Sofia Muratova	(Italy) 1960 Rome	Women's balance beam
Gold	Larisa Latynina	(Italy) 1960 Rome	Women's floor exercise
Silver	Polina Astakhova	(Italy) 1960 Rome	Women's floor exercise
Bronze	Tamara Lyukhina	(Italy) 1960 Rome	Women's floor exercise
Gold	Astakhova, Gromova, Latynina, Manina, Volchetskaya, Zamotaylova	(Japan) 1964 Tokyo	Women's team
Silver	Larisa Latynina	(Japan) 1964 Tokyo	Women's all-around
Bronze	Polina Astakhova	(Japan) 1964 Tokyo	Women's all-around
Silver	Larisa Latynina	(Japan) 1964 Tokyo	Women's vault
Gold	Polina Astakhova	(Japan) 1964 Tokyo	Women's uneven bars
Bronze	Larisa Latynina	(Japan) 1964 Tokyo	Women's uneven bars
Silver	Tamara Manina	(Japan) 1964 Tokyo	Women's balance beam
Bronze	Larisa Latynina	(Japan) 1964 Tokyo	Women's balance beam
Gold	Larisa Latynina	(Japan) 1964 Tokyo	Women's floor exercise
Silver	Polina Astakhova	(Japan) 1964 Tokyo	Women's floor exercise
Gold	Burda, Karasyova, Kuchinskaya, Petrik, Tourischeva, Voronina	1968 Mexico City	Women's team
Silver	Zinaida Voronina	1968 Mexico City	Women's all-around
Bronze	Natalia Kuchinskaya	1968 Mexico City	Women's all-around
Bronze	Zinaida Voronina	1968 Mexico City	Women's vault
Bronze	Zinaida Voronina	1968 Mexico City	Women's uneven bars
Gold	Natalia Kuchinskaya	1968 Mexico City	Women's balance beam
Bronze	Larisa Petrik	1968 Mexico City	Women's balance beam
Gold	Larisa Petrik	1968 Mexico City	Women's floor exercise
Bronze	Natalia Kuchinskaya	1968 Mexico City	Women's floor exercise
Gold	Burda, Korbut, Koshel, Lazakovich, Saadi, Tourischeva	(Germany) 1972 Munich	Women's team
Gold	Ludmila Tourischeva	(Germany) 1972 Munich	Women's all-around
Bronze	Tamara Lazakovich	(Germany) 1972 Munich	Women's all-around
Bronze	Ludmila Tourischeva	(Germany) 1972 Munich	Women's vault
Silver	Olga Korbut	(Germany) 1972 Munich	Women's uneven bars
Gold	Olga Korbut	(Germany) 1972 Munich	Women's balance beam
Silver	Tamara Lazakovich	(Germany) 1972 Munich	Women's balance beam
Gold	Olga Korbut	(Germany) 1972 Munich	Women's floor exercise
Silver	Ludmila Tourischeva	(Germany) 1972 Munich	Women's floor exercise
Gold	Filatova, Grozdova, Kim, Korbut, Saadi, Tourischeva	(Canada) 1976 Montreal	Women's team
Silver	Nellie Kim	(Canada) 1976 Montreal	Women's all-around
Bronze	Ludmila Tourischeva	(Canada) 1976 Montreal	Women's all-around
Gold	Nellie Kim	(Canada) 1976 Montreal	Women's vault
Silver	Ludmila Tourischeva	(Canada) 1976 Montreal	Women's vault
Silver	Olga Korbut	(Canada) 1976 Montreal	Women's balance beam
Gold	Nellie Kim	(Canada) 1976 Montreal	Women's floor exercise
Silver	Ludmila Tourischeva	(Canada) 1976 Montreal	Women's floor exercise
Gold	Davydova, Filatova, Kim, Naimushina, Shaposhnikova, Zakharova	(Soviet Union) 1980 Moscow	Women's team
Gold	Elena Davydova	(Soviet Union) 1980 Moscow	Women's all-around
Gold	Natalia Shaposhnikova	(Soviet Union) 1980 Moscow	Women's vault
Bronze	Maria Filatova	(Soviet Union) 1980 Moscow	Women's uneven bars
Silver	Elena Davydova	(Soviet Union) 1980 Moscow	Women's balance beam
Bronze	Natalia Shaposhnikova	(Soviet Union) 1980 Moscow	Women's balance beam
Gold	Nellie Kim	(Soviet Union) 1980 Moscow	Women's floor exercise
Bronze	Natalia Shaposhnikova	(Soviet Union) 1980 Moscow	Women's floor exercise
Gold	Baitova, Boginskaya, Laschenova, Shevchenko, Shushunova, Strazheva	(South Korea) 1988 Seoul	Women's team
Gold	Elena Shushunova	(South Korea) 1988 Seoul	Women's all-around
Bronze	Svetlana Boginskaya	(South Korea) 1988 Seoul	Women's all-around
Gold	Svetlana Boginskaya	(South Korea) 1988 Seoul	Women's vault
Bronze	Elena Shushunova	(South Korea) 1988 Seoul	Women's uneven bars
Silver	Elena Shushunova	(South Korea) 1988 Seoul	Women's balance beam
Silver	Svetlana Boginskaya	(South Korea) 1988 Seoul	Women's floor exercise
As the Unified Team (Unified Team at the Olympics)
Gold	Boginskaya, Chusovitina, Galiyeva, Grudneva, Gutsu, Lysenko	(Spain) 1992 Barcelona	Women's team
Gold	Tatiana Gutsu	(Spain) 1992 Barcelona	Women's all-around
Bronze	Tatiana Lysenko	(Spain) 1992 Barcelona	Women's vault
Silver	Tatiana Gutsu	(Spain) 1992 Barcelona	Women's uneven bars
Gold	Tatiana Lysenko	(Spain) 1992 Barcelona	Women's balance beam
Bronze	Tatiana Gutsu	(Spain) 1992 Barcelona	Women's floor exercise
