= Vault at the Olympics =

Vault at the Olympic Games
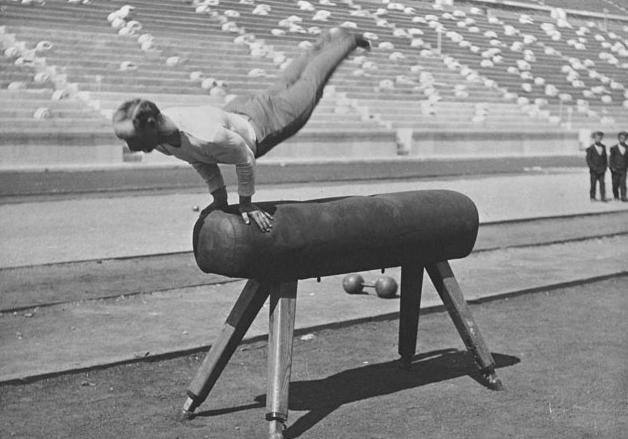
- The first men's vault winner, Carl Schuhmann, in 1896

Overview
- Sport: Artistic gymnastics
- Gender: Men and women
- Years held: Men: 1896, 1904, 1924–2024; Women: 1952–2024

Reigning champion
- Men: Carlos Yulo (PHI)
- Women: Simone Biles (USA)

The vault is an artistic gymnastics event held at the Summer Olympics. The event was first held for men at the first modern Olympics in 1896. It was held again in 1904, but not in 1900, 1908, 1912, or 1920 when no apparatus events were awarded medals. The vault was one of the components of the men's artistic individual all-around in 1900, however. The men's vault returned as a medal event in 1924 and has been held every Games since. Vault scores were included in the individual all-around for 1924 and 1928, with no separate apparatus final. In 1932, the vault was entirely separate from the all-around. From 1936 to 1956, there were again no separate apparatus finals with the vault scores used in the all-around. The women's vault was added in 1952 and has been held every Games since. Beginning in 1960, there were separate apparatus finals.

The vault used a "vaulting horse" until 2000; after that, a "vaulting table" has been used.

== Medalists ==
=== Men ===
Games	Gold	Silver	Bronze
1896 Athens	Carl Schuhmann; Germany	Louis Zutter; Switzerland	Hermann Weingärtner; Germany
1900 Paris	Not held		
1904 St. Louis	George Eyser; United States Anton Heida; United States	Not awarded	William Merz; United States
1908 London	Not held		
1912 Stockholm	Not held		
1920 Antwerp	Not held		
1924 Paris	Frank Kriz; United States	Jan Koutný; Czechoslovakia	Bohumil Mořkovský; Czechoslovakia
1928 Amsterdam	Eugen Mack; Switzerland	Emanuel Löffler; Czechoslovakia	Stane Derganc; Yugoslavia
1932 Los Angeles	Savino Guglielmetti; Italy	Al Jochim; United States	Ed Carmichael; United States
1936 Berlin	Alfred Schwarzmann; Germany	Eugen Mack; Switzerland	Matthias Volz; Germany
1948 London	Paavo Aaltonen; Finland	Olavi Rove; Finland	János Mogyorósi-Klencs; Hungary Ferenc Pataki; Hungary Leo Sotorník; Czechoslovakia
1952 Helsinki	Viktor Chukarin; Soviet Union	Masao Takemoto; Japan	Takashi Ono; Japan; Tadao Uesako; Japan
1956 Melbourne	Helmut Bantz; United Team of Germany Valentin Muratov; Soviet Union	Not awarded	Yuri Titov; Soviet Union
1960 Rome	Boris Shakhlin; Soviet Union Takashi Ono; Japan	Not awarded	Vladimir Portnoi; Soviet Union
1964 Tokyo	Haruhiro Yamashita; Japan	Victor Lisitsky; Soviet Union	Hannu Rantakari; Finland
1968 Mexico City	Mikhail Voronin; Soviet Union	Yukio Endo; Japan	Sergei Diomidov; Soviet Union
1972 Munich	Klaus Köste; East Germany	Viktor Klimenko; Soviet Union	Nikolai Andrianov; Soviet Union
1976 Montreal	Nikolai Andrianov; Soviet Union	Mitsuo Tsukahara; Japan	Hiroshi Kajiyama; Japan
1980 Moscow	Nikolai Andrianov; Soviet Union	Alexander Dityatin; Soviet Union	Roland Brückner; East Germany
1984 Los Angeles	Lou Yun; China	Li Ning; China Koji Gushiken; Japan Mitchell Gaylord; United States Shinji Morisue; Japan	Not awarded
1988 Seoul	Lou Yun; China	Sylvio Kroll; East Germany	Park Jong-Hoon; South Korea
1992 Barcelona	Vitaly Scherbo; Unified Team	Grigory Misutin; Unified Team	Yoo Ok-ryul; South Korea
1996 Atlanta	Alexei Nemov; Russia	Yeo Hong-Chul; South Korea	Vitaly Scherbo; Belarus
2000 Sydney	Gervasio Deferr; Spain	Alexei Bondarenko; Russia	Leszek Blanik; Poland
2004 Athens	Gervasio Deferr; Spain	Evgeni Sapronenko; Latvia	Marian Drăgulescu; Romania
2008 Beijing	Leszek Blanik; Poland	Thomas Bouhail; France	Anton Golotsutskov; Russia
2012 London	Yang Hak-Seon; South Korea	Denis Ablyazin; Russia	Igor Radivilov; Ukraine
2016 Rio de Janeiro	Ri Se-gwang; North Korea	Denis Ablyazin; Russia	Kenzō Shirai; Japan
2020 Tokyo	Shin Jea-hwan; South Korea	Denis Ablyazin; ROC	Artur Davtyan; Armenia
2024 Paris	Carlos Yulo; Philippines	Artur Davtyan; Armenia	Harry Hepworth; Great Britain

==== Multiple medalists ====
Rank	Gymnast	Nation	Olympics	Gold	Silver	Bronze	Total
1	Nikolai Andrianov	Soviet Union	1972–1980	2	0	1	3
2	Lou Yun	China	1984–1988	2	0	0	2
2	Gervasio Deferr	Spain	2000–2004	2	0	0	2
4	Eugen Mack	Switzerland	1928–1936	1	1	0	2
5	Vitaly Scherbo	Unified Team; Belarus	1992–1996	1	0	1	2
5	Takashi Ono	Japan	1952–1960	1	0	1	2
5	Leszek Blanik	Poland	2000–2008	1	0	1	2
8	Denis Ablyazin	Russia; ROC	2012–2020	0	3	0	3
9	Artur Davtyan	Armenia	2020–2024	0	1	1	2

==== Medalists by country ====
Rank	Nation	Gold	Silver	Bronze	Total
1	Soviet Union	6	3	4	13
2	United States	3	2	2	7
3	Japan	2	5	4	11
4	China	2	1	0	3
5	South Korea	2	0	3	5
6	Germany	2	0	2	4
7	Spain	2	0	0	2
8	Russia	1	3	1	5
9	Switzerland	1	2	0	3
10	Finland	1	1	1	3
10	East Germany	1	1	1	3
12	Unified Team	1	1	0	2
13	Poland	1	0	1	2
14	United Team of Germany	1	0	0	1
14	Italy	1	0	0	1
14	North Korea	1	0	0	1
14	Philippines	1	0	0	1
18	Czechoslovakia	0	2	2	4
19	Armenia	0	1	1	2
20	France	0	1	0	1
20	Latvia	0	1	0	1
20	ROC	0	1	0	1
23	Hungary	0	0	2	2
24	Belarus	0	0	1	1
24	Great Britain	0	0	1	1
24	Romania	0	0	1	1
24	Ukraine	0	0	1	1
24	Yugoslavia	0	0	1	1

=== Women ===
Games	Gold	Silver	Bronze
1952 Helsinki	Ekaterina Kalinchuk; Soviet Union	Maria Gorokhovskaya; Soviet Union	Galina Minaicheva; Soviet Union
1956 Melbourne	Larisa Latynina; Soviet Union	Tamara Manina; Soviet Union	Olga Tass; Hungary Ann-Sofi Colling; Sweden
1960 Rome	Margarita Nikolaeva; Soviet Union	Sofia Muratova; Soviet Union	Larisa Latynina; Soviet Union
1964 Tokyo	Věra Čáslavská; Czechoslovakia	Larisa Latynina; Soviet Union	Birgit Radochla; United Team of Germany
1968 Mexico City	Věra Čáslavská; Czechoslovakia	Erika Zuchold; East Germany	Zinaida Voronina; Soviet Union
1972 Munich	Karin Janz; East Germany	Erika Zuchold; East Germany	Ludmila Tourischeva; Soviet Union
1976 Montreal	Nellie Kim; Soviet Union	Carola Dombeck; East Germany Ludmila Tourischeva; Soviet Union	Not awarded
1980 Moscow	Natalia Shaposhnikova; Soviet Union	Steffi Kräker; East Germany	Melita Ruhn; Romania
1984 Los Angeles	Ecaterina Szabo; Romania	Mary Lou Retton; United States	Lavinia Agache; Romania
1988 Seoul	Svetlana Boginskaya; Soviet Union	Gabriela Potorac; Romania	Daniela Silivaş; Romania
1992 Barcelona	Henrietta Ónodi; Hungary Lavinia Miloșovici; Romania	Not awarded	Tatiana Lysenko; Unified Team
1996 Atlanta	Simona Amânar; Romania	Mo Huilan; China	Gina Gogean; Romania
2000 Sydney	Elena Zamolodchikova; Russia	Andreea Răducan; Romania	Yekaterina Lobaznyuk; Russia
2004 Athens	Monica Roșu; Romania	Annia Hatch; United States	Anna Pavlova; Russia
2008 Beijing	Hong Un Jong; North Korea	Oksana Chusovitina; Germany	Cheng Fei; China
2012 London	Sandra Izbașa; Romania	McKayla Maroney; United States	Maria Paseka; Russia
2016 Rio de Janeiro	Simone Biles; United States	Maria Paseka; Russia	Giulia Steingruber; Switzerland
2020 Tokyo	Rebeca Andrade; Brazil	MyKayla Skinner; United States	Yeo Seo-jeong; South Korea
2024 Paris	Simone Biles; United States	Rebeca Andrade; Brazil	Jade Carey; United States

==== Multiple medalists ====
Rank	Gymnast	Nation	Olympics	Gold	Silver	Bronze	Total
1	Simone Biles	United States	2016, 2024	2	0	0	2
1	Věra Čáslavská	Czechoslovakia	1964–1968	2	0	0	2
3	Larisa Latynina	Soviet Union	1956–1964	1	1	1	3
4	Rebeca Andrade	Brazil	2020–2024	1	1	0	2
5	Erika Zuchold	East Germany	1968–1972	0	2	0	2
6	Ludmilla Tourischeva	Soviet Union	1972–1976	0	1	1	2
6	Maria Paseka	Russia	2012–2016	0	1	1	2

==== Medalists by country ====
Rank	Nation	Gold	Silver	Bronze	Total
1	Soviet Union	6	5	4	15
2	Romania	5	2	4	11
3	United States	2	4	1	7
4	Czechoslovakia	2	0	0	2
5	East Germany	1	4	0	5
6	Russia	1	1	3	5
7	Brazil	1	1	0	2
8	Hungary	1	0	1	2
9	North Korea	1	0	0	1
10	China	0	1	1	2
11	Germany	0	1	0	1
12	South Korea	0	0	1	1
12	Sweden	0	0	1	1
12	Switzerland	0	0	1	1
12	Unified Team	0	0	1	1
12	United Team of Germany	0	0	1	1

== Gallery ==
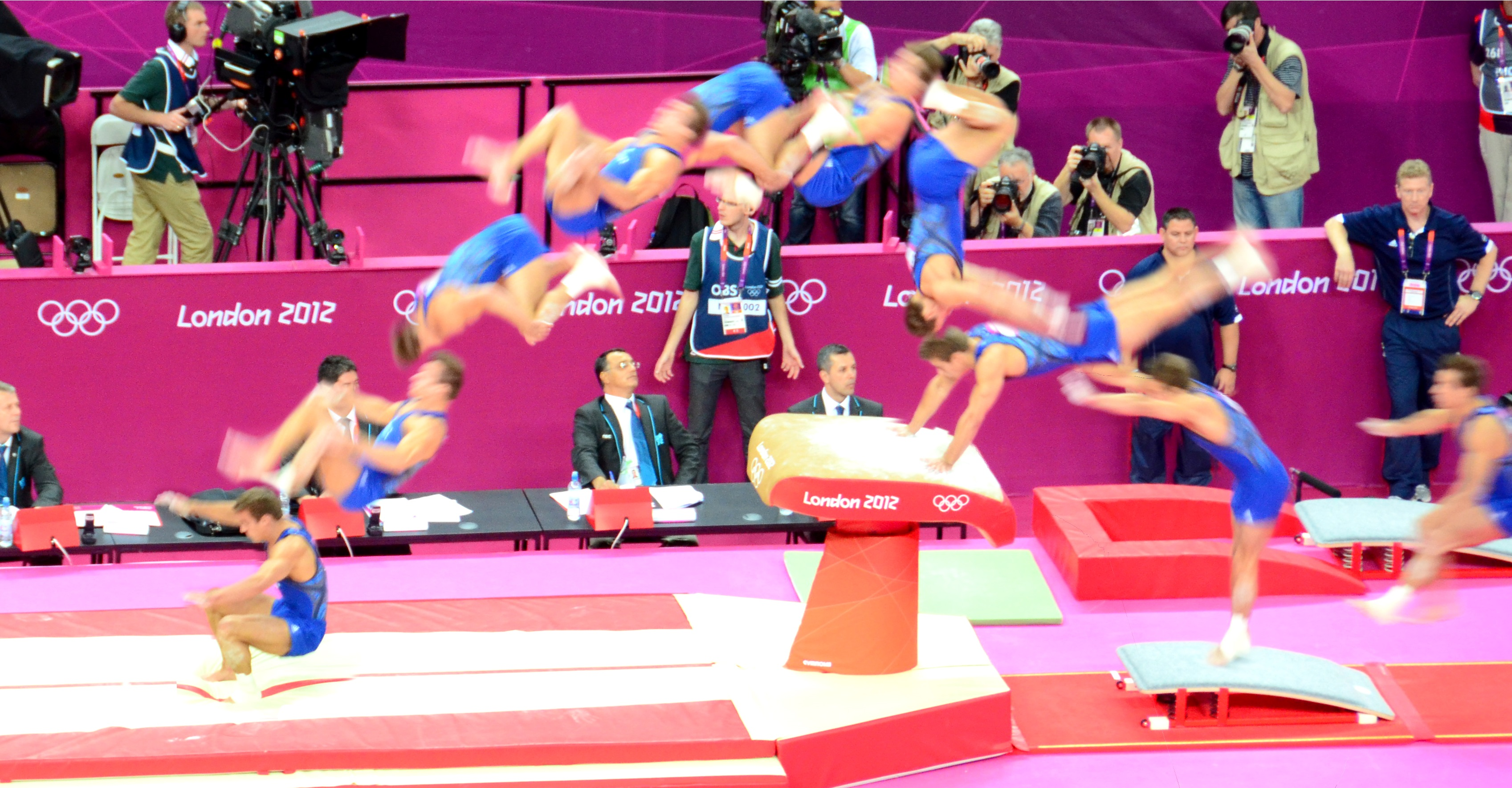
handspring double salto forward tucked (2012)

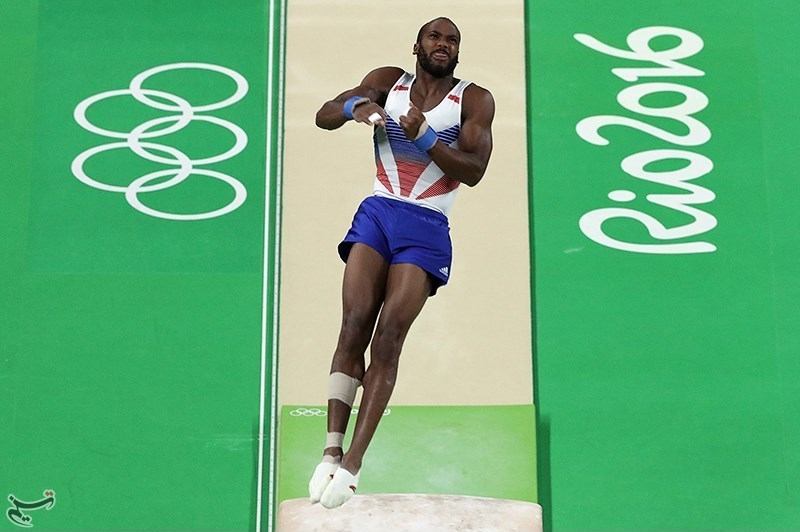
Axel Augis, 2016

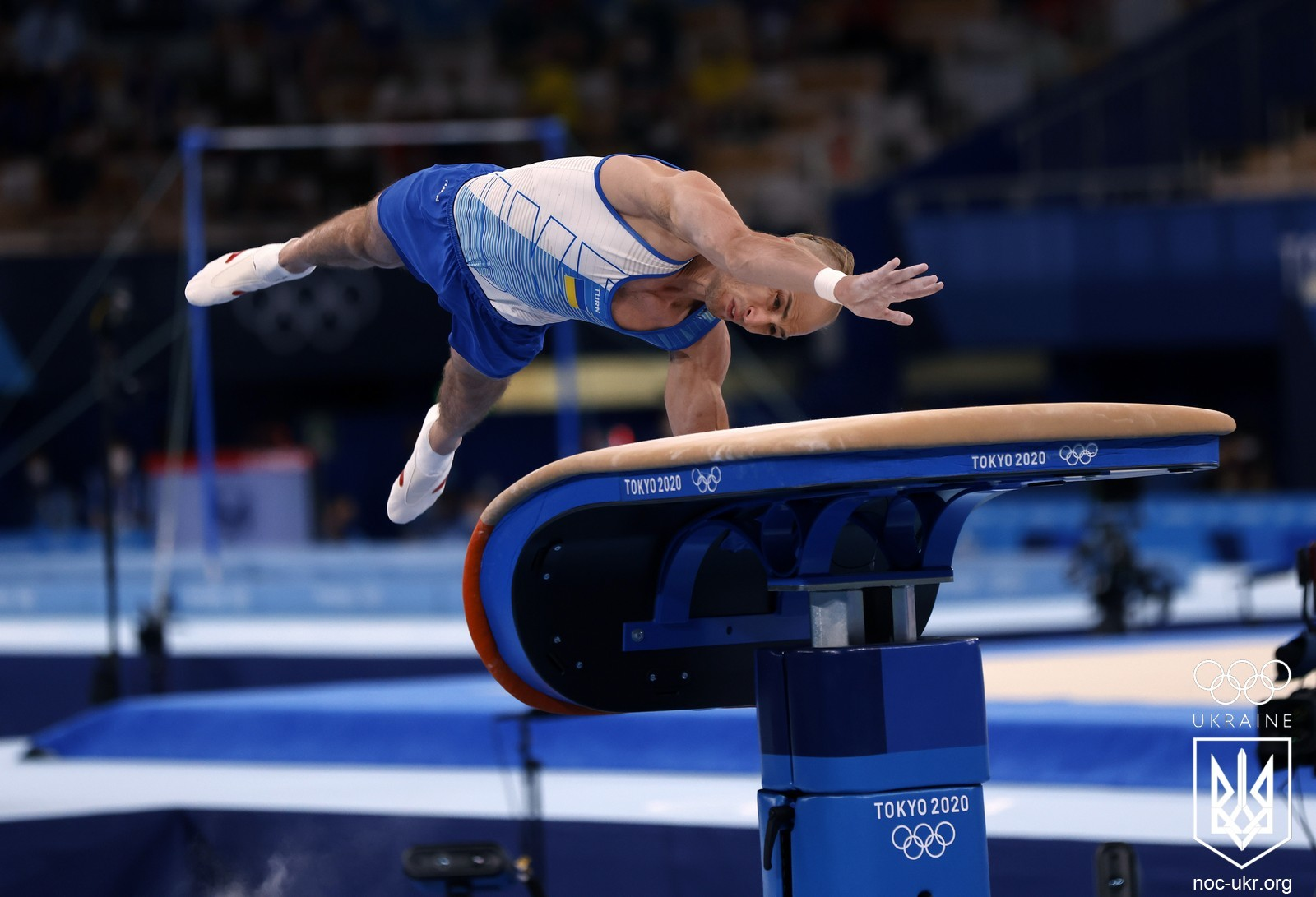
Petro Pakhnyuk, 2020

Men's Vault at the Olympics

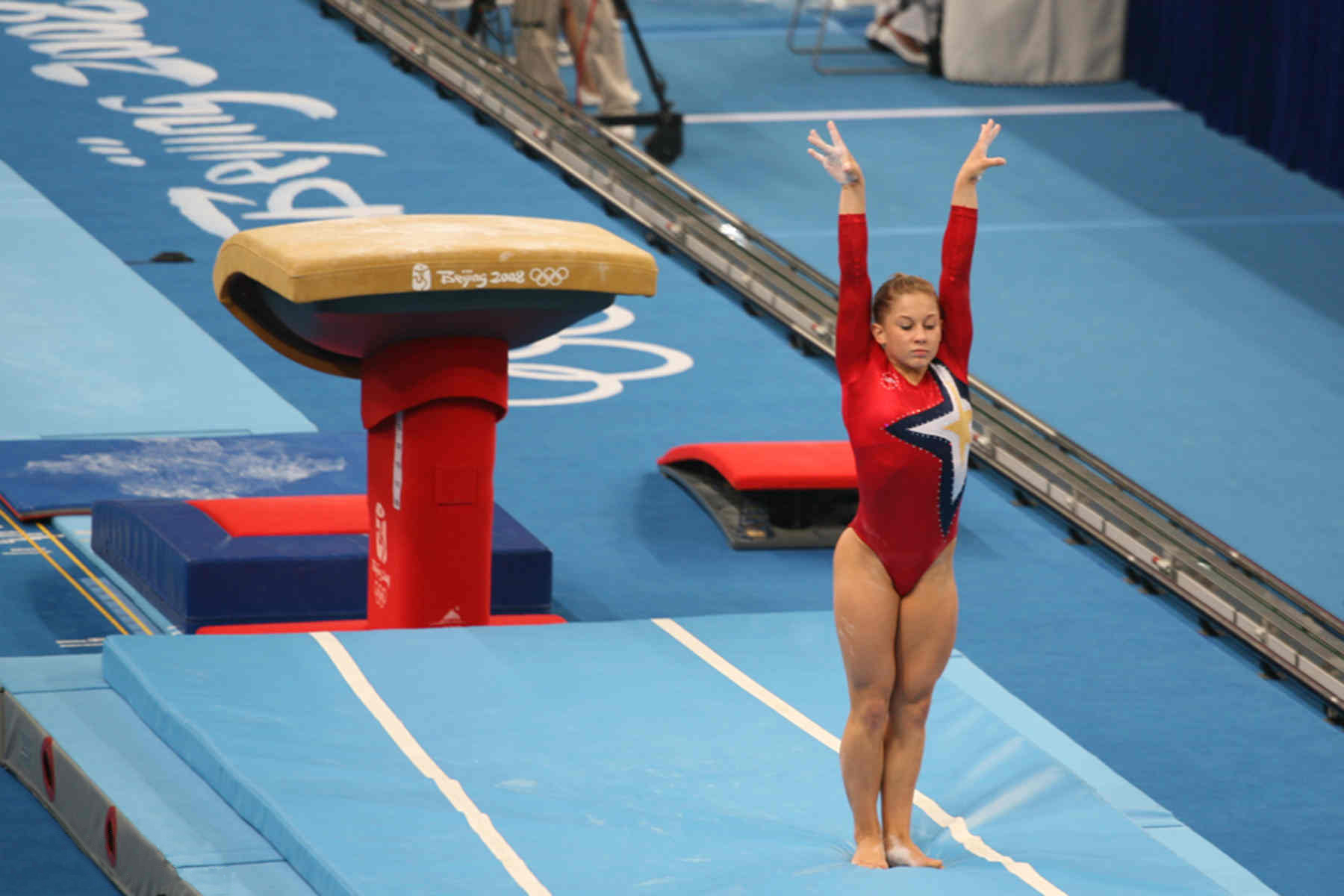
Shawn Johnson, 2008

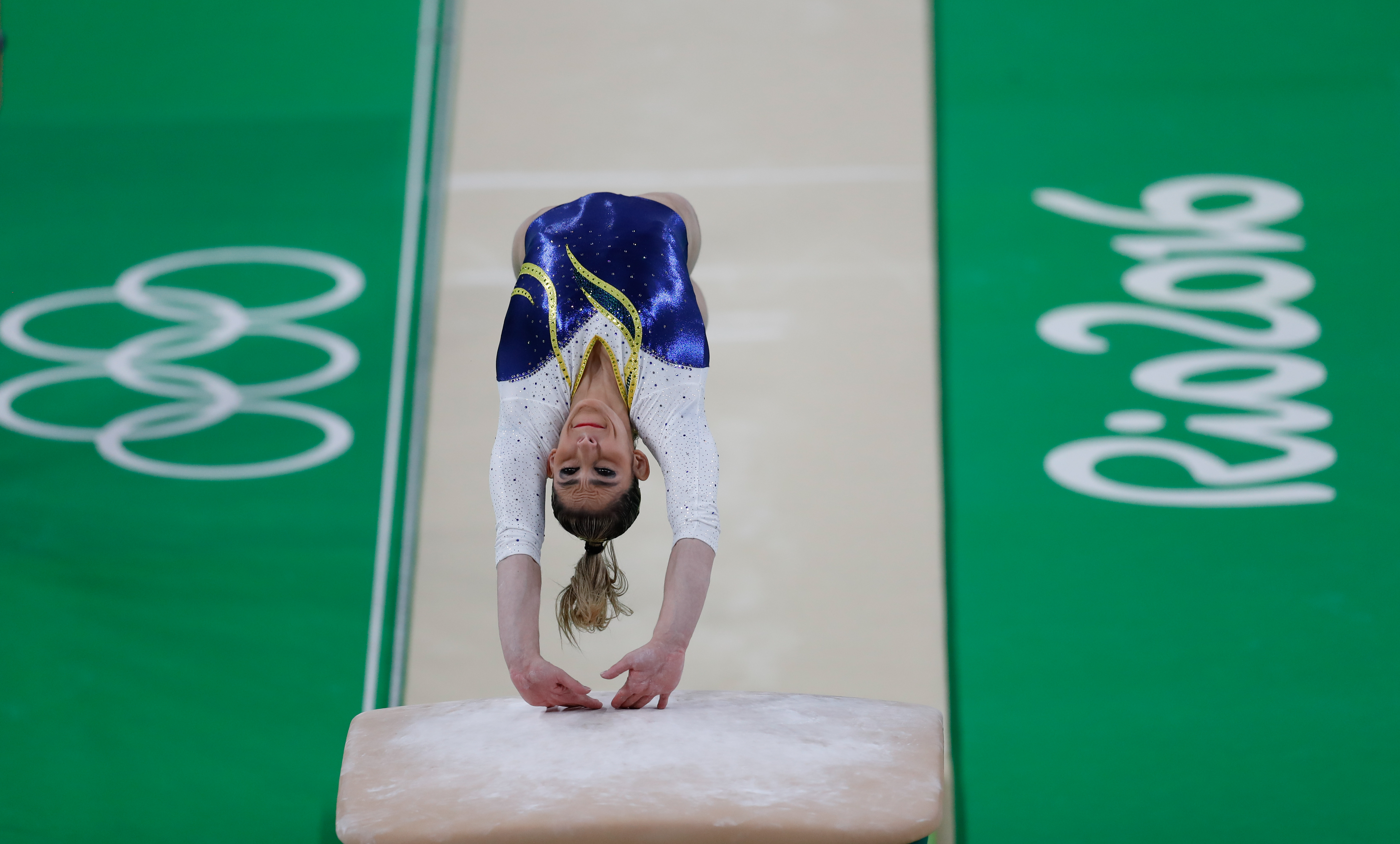
Daniele Hypólito, 2016

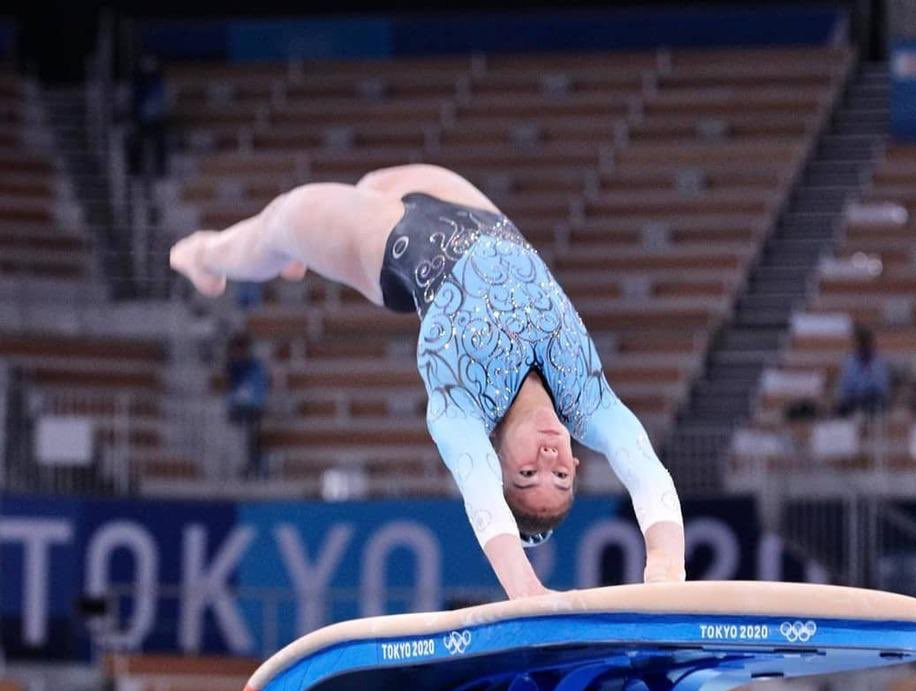
Abigail Magistrati, 2020

Women's Vault at the Olympics

== Sidehorse vault ==
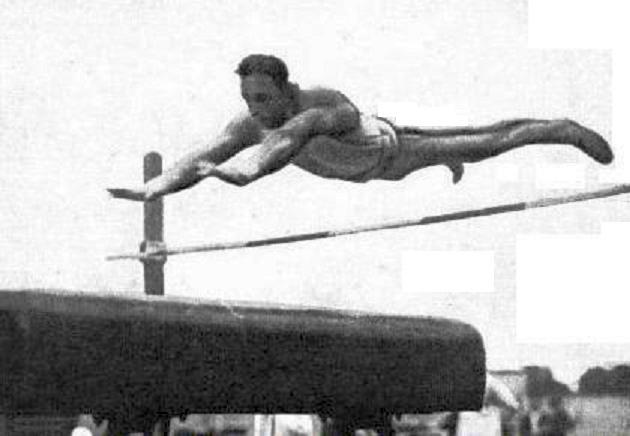
Albert Séguin, gold medalist in the sidehorse vault

The 1924 Summer Olympics had an odd programme. The regular vault event featured an unusual format, using a bar that had to be jumped over between the springboard and the vaulting horse. There was also a "sidehorse vault" (French: saut de cheval en largeur) event in which the competitors used a vaulting horse set sideways (perpendicular to the approach) to make a single flip. This was the only time that event was held.

Games	Gold	Silver	Bronze
1924 Paris	Albert Séguin; France	Jean Gounot; France François Gangloff; France	—N/a
