= Zhigalov =

Zhigalov or Žigalov (Russian: Жигалов) is a Russian masculine surname, its feminine counterpart is Zhigalova or Žigalova. It may refer to

- Aleksey Zhigalov (1915–1963), Russian diver
- Lyubov Zhigalova (1924–1978), Russian diver, wife of Aleksey
- Marietta Žigalová (born 1968), Slovak fitness competitor
- Mikhail Zhigalov (born 1942), Russian actor
