= Ūdras =

Ūdras or Udras is a surname. Notable people with the surname include:

- Aivo Udras (born 1970), Estonian biathlete
- Juozas Ūdras (1925–1991), Lithuanian-Soviet Olympic fencer
