= Esther Brand =

South African athlete

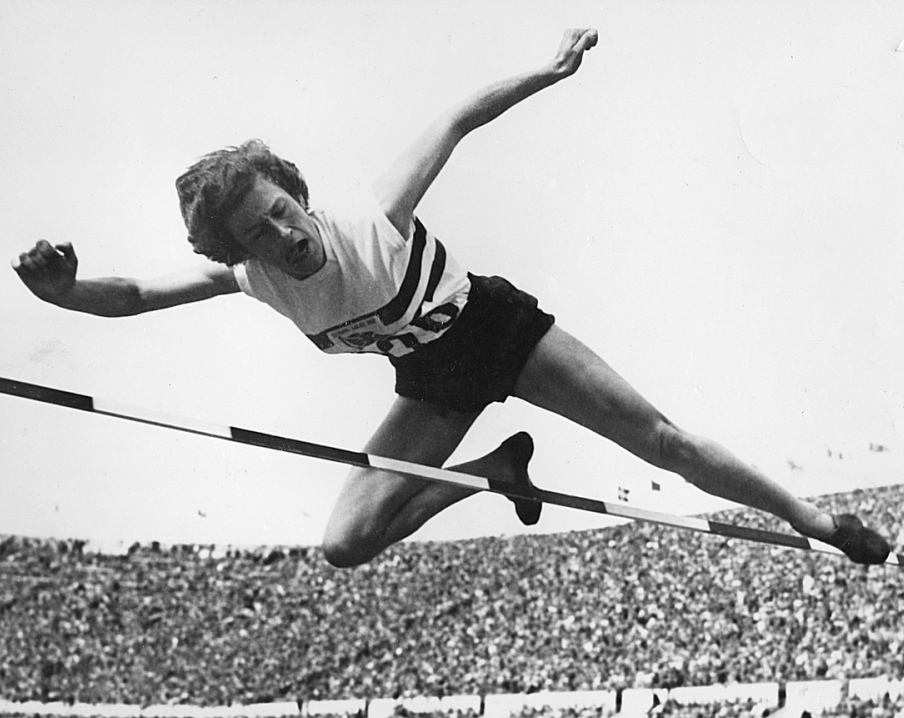
- Esther Brand at the 1952 Olympics

Personal information
- Born: 29 September 1922 Springbok, Northern Cape, South Africa
- Died: 20 June 2015 (aged 92) Bloemfontein, Free State, South Africa

Sport
- Sport: Athletics
- Events: High jump, discus throw

Achievements and titles
- Personal bests: HJ – 1.67 m (1952); DT – 40.30 m(1952)
Medal record
Representing South Africa
Olympic Games
| Gold medal – first place | 1952 Helsinki | High jump |

Esther Cornelia Brand (née van Heerden; 29 September 1922 – 20 June 2015) was a South African athlete. She competed at the 1952 Summer Olympics and won a gold medal in the high jump, placed 20th in the discus throw. She was the first African woman to win an Olympic track and field event. Brand was ranked world #1 in the high jump in 1940–41 and 1952, #3 in 1951 and #5 in 1939. In 1941 she equaled the world record of 1.66 m.

Born in Springbok, Northern Cape, she attended Maitland High School in Cape Town, South Africa. She died after a fall in 2015.
