= Solveig Ericsson =

Swedish high jumper

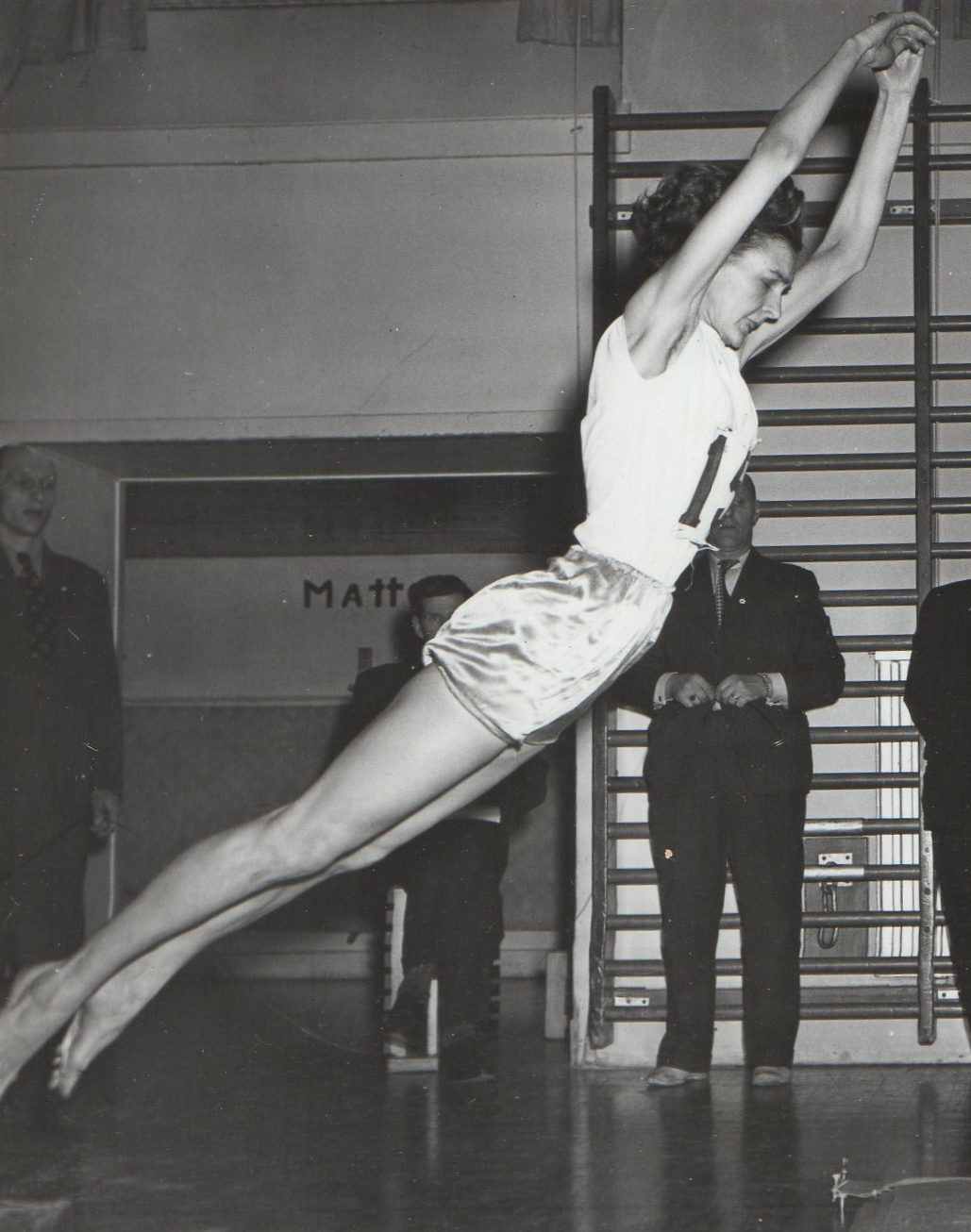

Personal information
- Nationality: Swedish
- Born: 24 January 1932
- Died: 19 April 2016 (aged 84)

Sport
- Sport: Athletics
- Event: High jump

Solveig Ericsson (24 January 1932 – 19 April 2016) was a Swedish athlete. She competed in the women's high jump at the 1952 Summer Olympics.
