= Sisko Heikkilä =

Finnish high jumper

Personal information
- Nationality: Finnish
- Born: 23 December 1921 Iitti, Finland
- Died: 24 January 1997 (aged 75) Iitti, Finland

Sport
- Sport: Athletics
- Event: High jump

Sisko Heikkilä (23 December 1921 – 24 January 1997) was a Finnish athlete. She competed in the women's high jump at the 1952 Summer Olympics.
