= 1950 European Athletics Championships – Women's high jump =

Women's high jump at the European Athletics Championships

The women's high jump at the 1950 European Athletics Championships was held in Brussels, Belgium, at Heysel Stadium on 26 August 1950.

== Medalists ==
Gold	Sheila Lerwill; Great Britain
Silver	Dorothy Tyler-Odam; Great Britain
Bronze	Galina Ganeker; Soviet Union

== Results ==
=== Final ===
26 August

Rank	Name	Nationality	Result	Notes
1st place, gold medalist(s)	Sheila Lerwill	Great Britain	1.63	
2nd place, silver medalist(s)	Dorothy Tyler-Odam	Great Britain	1.63	
3rd place, bronze medalist(s)	Galina Ganeker	Soviet Union	1.63	
4	Anna Knudsen	Denmark	1.60	
5	Bertha Crowther	Great Britain	1.55	
6	Anne-Marie Colchen	France	1.50	
7	Simone Peirone	France	1.50	
8	Berta Sablatnig	Austria	1.45	
9	Jozefa Dierick	Belgium	1.40	
9	Anita Roussel	France	1.40	

== Participation ==
According to an unofficial count, 10 athletes from 6 countries participated in the event.

- Austria (1)
- Belgium (1)
- Denmark (1)
- France (3)
- Soviet Union (1)
- Great Britain (3)
