= Athletics at the 1952 Summer Olympics – Women's high jump =

Women's high jump at the Games of the XV Olympiad
- Date: July 27
- Competitors: 17 from 10 nations
- Winning height: 1.67

Medalists
1st place, gold medalist(s)		Esther Brand	South Africa
2nd place, silver medalist(s)		Sheila Lerwill	Great Britain
3rd place, bronze medalist(s)		Aleksandra Chudina	Soviet Union

The Women's high jump at the 1952 Olympic Games took place on 27 July at the Helsinki Olympic Stadium. South African athlete Esther Brand won the gold medal.

== Records ==
Prior to this competition, the existing world and Olympic records were as follows.

World record	(United Kingdom) Sheila Lerwill (GBR)	1.72 m	London, England	7 July 1951
Olympic record	Alice Coachman (USA)	1.68 m	London, United Kingdom	7 August 1948

No new records were set during this competition.

== Results ==
Competition consisted of a final round with all 17 contestants.

Rank	Athlete	1.35	1.40	1.45	1.50	1.55	1.58	1.61	1.63	1.65	1.67	1.69	Result
1st place, gold medalist(s)	Esther Brand (RSA)	–	o	o	o	o	o	o	xo	xo	xxo	xxx	1.67
2nd place, silver medalist(s)	Sheila Lerwill (GBR)	–	o	–	xo	o	o	o	xxxo	xxo	xxx		1.65
3rd place, bronze medalist(s)	Aleksandra Chudina (URS)	–	–	o	o	o	o	xo	o	xxx			1.63
4	Thelma Hopkins (GBR)	–	–	–	o	o	o	xxx					1.58
5	Olga Modrachová (TCH)	–	o	o	o	o	o	xxx					1.58
6	Fedora Schenk (AUT)	–	–	o	o	o	xo	xxx					1.58
7	Nina Kossova (URS)	–	–	o	o	o	xxo	xxx					1.58
7	Dorothy Tyler (GBR)	–	–	o	o	o	xxo	xxx					1.58
9	Gunhild Larking (SWE)	–	o	o	o	o	xxx						1.55
10	Alice Whitty (CAN)	o	o	o	o	xo	xxx						1.55
11	Galina Ganeker (URS)	–	–	o	xo	xo	xxx						1.55
12	Deyse de Castro (BRA)	–	–	–	o	xxx							1.50
13	Dawn Josephs (CAN)	o	o	o	o	xxx							1.50
14	Solveig Ericsson (SWE)	–	o	xo	o	xxx							1.50
15	Seija Pöntinen (FIN)	–	o	o	xxo	xxx							1.50
16	Sisko Heikkilä (FIN)	o	o	xxx									1.40
17	Tamara Metal (ISR)	o	xo	xxx									1.40
	Berta Sablatnig (AUT)												DNS
	Kathleen Russell (JAM)												DNS
