= Yevgeny Semyonov =

Soviet water polo player

Personal information
- Nationality: Soviet
- Born: 21 December 1920
- Died: December 1988

Sport
- Sport: Water polo

Yevgeny Semyonov (21 December 1920 – December 1988) was a Soviet water polo player. He competed in the men's tournament at the 1952 Summer Olympics.
