= Viktor Drobinsky =

Soviet swimmer

Personal information
- Born: 3 October 1932 Moscow, Soviet Union
- Died: December 1997 (aged 65)

Sport
- Sport: Swimming

Viktor Drobinsky (3 October 1932 – December 1997) was a Soviet swimmer. He competed in two events at the 1952 Summer Olympics.
