= Mikhail Perlman =

Soviet gymnast

- Full name: Mikhail Romanovich Perlman
- Alternative name: Михаил Романович Перльман
- Born: March 23, 1923 Moscow, Russian SFSR, Soviet Union
- Died: August 8, 2002 (aged 79)

Gymnastics career
- Country represented: Soviet Union
- Club: CSKA Moskva
Medal record
Representing Soviet Union
Men's artistic gymnastics
Olympic Games
Gold medal – first place	1952 Helsinki	Team competition

Mikhail Romanovich Perlman (also Perelman; Russian: Михаи́л Рома́нович Пе́рльман; 21 March 1923 – 8 August 2002) was a former Soviet gymnast.

Perlman was born in Moscow, Russia and was Jewish.

== Olympics ==
Perlman won a gold medal in the men's team in gymnastics at the 1952 Olympics in Helsinki for the USSR. He also took fourth place in the men's pommel horse.

== See also ==
- List of select Jewish gymnasts
