= Aleksandr Liferenko =

Soviet water polo player (born 1930)

Personal information
- Nationality: Soviet
- Born: 1930

Sport
- Sport: Water polo

Aleksandr Liferenko (born 1930) is a Soviet water polo player. He competed in the men's tournament at the 1952 Summer Olympics.
