= Galina Ganeker =

Azerbaijani high jumper

Personal information
- Nationality: Azerbaijani
- Born: 10 April 1917 Baku, Russian Empire

Sport
- Sport: Athletics
- Event: High jump
Medal record
Women's athletics
Representing Soviet Union
European Championships
Bronze medal – third place	1950 Brussels	High jump

Galina Ganeker (born 10 April 1917, date of death unknown) was an Azerbaijani athlete. She competed in the women's high jump at the 1952 Summer Olympics, representing the Soviet Union.
