= Nikolay Sitko =

Soviet equestrian

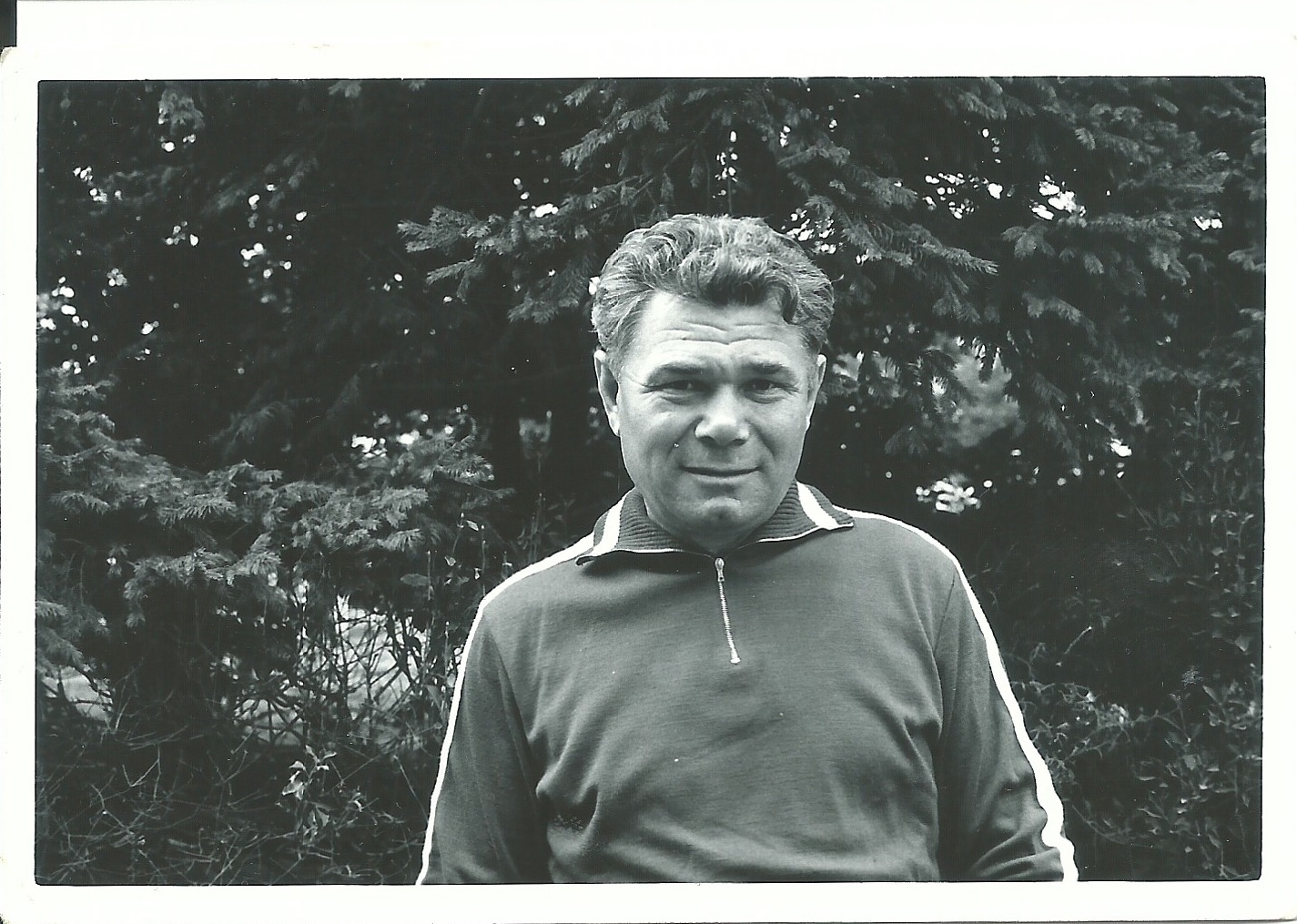
- 2020

Personal information
- Nationality: Soviet
- Born: 9 May 1914

Sport
- Sport: Equestrian

Nikolay Sitko (born 9 May 1914, date of death unknown) was a Soviet equestrian. He competed at the 1952 Summer Olympics and the 1956 Summer Olympics.
