= Tamara Zamotaylova =

Soviet gymnast

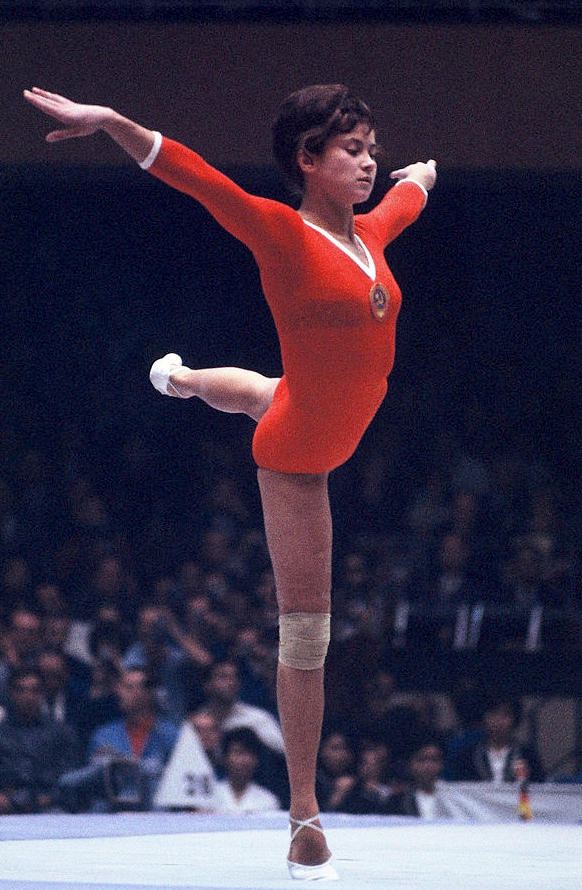
- Tamara Zamotaylova at the 1964 Olympics

Personal information
- Full name: Tamara Alekseyevna Lyukhina-Zamotaylova
- Born: 11 May 1939 (age 87) Voronezh, Russian SFSR, Soviet Union
- Height: 1.56 m (5 ft 1 in)

Gymnastics career
- Discipline: Women's artistic gymnastics
- Country represented: Soviet Union
- Club: Burevestnik Voronezh; Spartak Voronezh
Medal record
Olympic Games
Gold medal – first place	1960 Rome	Team all-round
Gold medal – first place	1964 Tokyo	Team all-round
Bronze medal – third place	1960 Rome	Floor
Bronze medal – third place	1960 Rome	Uneven bars

Tamara Alekseyevna Lyukhina-Zamotaylova (Russian: Тамара Алексеевна Люхина-Замотайлова; née Lyukhina: born 11 May 1939) is a former Soviet gymnast who won four Olympic medals at the 1960 and 1964 Summer Olympics.

Lyukhina graduated from Voronezh State University in 1963 and later from the Voronezh Institute of Physical Eductation in 1988. After retiring from competition, she worked as gymnastics coach and referee. She became an international gymnastics referee in 1975.
