= Vladimir Raspopov =

Soviet equestrian (1927–1999)

Personal information
- Nationality: Soviet
- Born: 20 April 1927
- Died: 1999 (aged 71–72)

Sport
- Sport: Equestrian

Vladimir Raspopov (20 April 1927 – 1999) was a Soviet equestrian. He competed at the 1952 Summer Olympics, the 1956 Summer Olympics and the 1960 Summer Olympics.
