= Vasily Tikhonov (equestrian) =

Soviet equestrian

Personal information
- Nationality: Soviet
- Born: October 1909
- Died: 1987

Sport
- Sport: Equestrian

Vasily Tikhonov (October 1909 – 1987) was a Soviet equestrian. He competed in two events at the 1952 Summer Olympics.
