= Yury Teplov =

Soviet water polo player (born 1931)

Personal information
- Nationality: Soviet
- Born: 1931

Sport
- Sport: Water polo

Yury Teplov (born 1931) is a retired water polo player who competed for the Soviet Union. He competed in the men's tournament at the 1952 Summer Olympics.
