= Nina Kossova =

Soviet high jumper

Personal information
- Nationality: Soviet
- Born: 9 June 1935 (age 91)

Sport
- Sport: Athletics
- Event: High jump

Nina Kossova (born 9 June 1935) is a Soviet athlete. She competed in the women's high jump at the 1952 Summer Olympics.
