= Nina Bocharova =

Soviet-Ukrainian gymnast (1924–2020)

- Full name: Nina Antonovna Bocharova
- Born: September 24, 1924 Suprunivka, Poltava Governorate, Ukrainian SSR, Soviet Union
- Died: August 30, 2020 (aged 95) Rome, Italy

Gymnastics career
- Discipline: Women's artistic gymnastics
- Country represented: Soviet Union
Medal record
Olympic Games
Gold medal – first place	1952 Helsinki	Team competition
Gold medal – first place	1952 Helsinki	Balance beam
Silver medal – second place	1952 Helsinki	Team, portable apparatus
Silver medal – second place	1952 Helsinki	All-around
World Championships
Gold medal – first place	1954 Rome	Team

Nina Antonovna Bocharova (Ukrainian: Ніна Антонівна Бочарова, September 24, 1924 – August 30, 2020) was a Soviet/Ukrainian gymnast, who won four medals at the 1952 Summer Olympics. She was born in Suprunivka, Poltava Oblast, Ukrainian SSR, Soviet Union.

== Career ==
Bocharova competed for Budivelnyk, Kyiv (Stroitel, Kiev), debuting at the Nationals in 1948, where she placed fourth on the uneven bars and balance beam. These two were her best events throughout the career.

She won the all-around titles at the USSR Championships in 1949 and 1951, with Maria Gorokhovskaya being her main rival.

In 1952 Bocharova competed in the 1952 Summer Olympics, the first official Olympics for Soviet athletes participation. Placing 2nd to Gorokhovskaya in the all-around, she won the gold on the beam and contributed to the team's gold. She also earned another silver medal in the team exercise with hand apparatus event.

At age 30 she competed in the 1954 World Artistic Gymnastics Championships, winning the gold medal in the team competition, and finished her career afterwards.

In the early 2000s Nina Bocharova still actively participated in sports activities and meetings and was honoured to be the relay originating torchbearer of the 2004 Olympic Torch Relay on Ukrainian territory.

== Death ==
Bocharova died in Rome, Italy, on August 30, 2020, 24 days before her 96th birthday.

== Competitive history ==
Year	Event	Team	AA	VT	UB	BB	FX
1948	USSR Championships		5				
1949	Match of the Best Gymnasts		7				
1949	USSR Championships		1st place, gold medalist(s)				
1949	USSR Team Championships		5			1st place, gold medalist(s)	
1950	HUN-USSR Dual Meet	1st place, gold medalist(s)	5			2nd place, silver medalist(s)	
1950	USSR Championships		5				
1951	USSR Championships		1st place, gold medalist(s)		1st place, gold medalist(s)	1st place, gold medalist(s)	
1952
1952	Olympic Games	1st place, gold medalist(s)	2nd place, silver medalist(s)	6	4	1st place, gold medalist(s)	
1952	USSR-HUN Dual Meet	1st place, gold medalist(s)	4				
1953	USSR Team Championships		3rd place, bronze medalist(s)				
1953	World Youth Festival	1st place, gold medalist(s)	1st place, gold medalist(s)	4	1st place, gold medalist(s)	2nd place, silver medalist(s)	
1954	International Meet in Leningrad		6				
1954	World Championships	1st place, gold medalist(s)	6		4	6	
1956	USSR Championships	1st place, gold medalist(s)				4	
1956	USSR Cup	3rd place, bronze medalist(s)	5		3rd place, bronze medalist(s)		
