= Pelageya Danilova =

Soviet gymnast (1918–2001)

Personal information
- Born: 4 May 1918 Boroviki, Pskov Oblast, Soviet Russia
- Died: 31 July 2001 (aged 83) Saint Petersburg, Russia

Sport
- Sport: Artistic gymnastics
- Club: Burevestnik Leningrad
Medal record
Representing the Soviet Union
Olympic Games
Gold medal – first place	1952 Helsinki	Team allround
Silver medal – second place	1952 Helsinki	Team portable apparatus
World Championships
Gold medal – first place	1954 Rome	Team allround

Pelageya Aleksandrovna Danilova (Russian: Пелаге́я Алекса́ндровна Дани́лова; 4 May 1918 – 31 July 2001) was a Russian artistic gymnast. She competed at the 1952 Summer Olympics, finishing within top 12 in all artistic gymnastics events, and winning one gold and one silver medal.

After marriage she changed her last name to Demirdzhiyan (Russian: Демирджиян). In 1953 she graduated from the Institute of Physical Education in Saint Petersburg and after retirement worked as a gymnastics coach, first with Burevestnik and then as a head coach of Lokomotiv. In the 1970s she worked with the national team of Bulgaria.
