= Galina Urbanovich =

Soviet gymnast (1917–2011)

Personal information
- Full name: Galina Napoleonovna Urbanovich
- Born: 5 September 1917 Baku, Special Transcaucasian Committee
- Died: 8 May 2011 (aged 93)

Gymnastics career
- Discipline: Women's artistic gymnastics
- Country represented: Soviet Union
- Retired: 1953
Medal record
Olympic Games
Gold medal – first place	1952 Helsinki	Team competition
Silver medal – second place	1952 Helsinki	Team, portable apparatus

Galina Napoleonovna Urbanovich (Russian: Галина Наполеоновна Урбанович) (September 5, 1917 – May 8, 2011) was a Soviet Olympic gymnast. She won a gold and silver medal at the 1952 Helsinki games. She was seven times all-around gymnastics champion of the USSR. Her achievements earned her the Honoured Master of Sports of the USSR award. She was from a Lithuanian family.

In 2016, she was elected to the International Jewish Sports Hall of Fame.
