= Lyubov Zhigalova =

Russian diver

Personal information
- Born: 15 March 1924 Moscow, Russian SFSR, Soviet Union
- Died: 13 February 1978 (aged 53) Moscow, Russian SFSR, Soviet Union

Sport
- Sport: Diving
- Club: Dynamo Moscow
Medal record
Representing the Soviet Union
European Championships
Bronze medal – third place	1954 Turin	Springboard

Lyubov Yegorovna Zhigalova (Russian: Любовь Егоровна Жигалова, 15 March 1924 – 13 February 1978) was a Soviet diver. She competed in the 3 m springboard and 10 m platform at the 1952 and 1956 Summer Olympics, respectively, and finished in sixth place in both events. She won a bronze medal in the springboard at the 1954 European Aquatics Championships. She won seven national titles, in the springboard (1947, 1950, 1951, 1953 and 1954) and platform (1950, 1951). Her husband, Aleksey Zhigalov, also competed in the springboard at the 1952 Olympics.
