= Maria Gorokhovskaya =

Soviet gymnast (1921–2001)

- Мария Гороховская

Personal information
- Born: 17 October 1921 Yevpatoria, Crimean ASSR, Russian SFSR
- Died: 22 July 2001 (aged 79) Tel Aviv, Israel

Gymnastics career
- Discipline: Women's artistic gymnastics
- Country represented: Soviet Union
- Club: Stroityel Kharkov
Medal record
Representing Soviet Union
Olympic Games
Gold medal – first place	1952 Helsinki	Team
Gold medal – first place	1952 Helsinki	All-Around
Silver medal – second place	1952 Helsinki	Team PA
Silver medal – second place	1952 Helsinki	Vault
Silver medal – second place	1952 Helsinki	Uneven Bars
Silver medal – second place	1952 Helsinki	Balance Beam
Silver medal – second place	1952 Helsinki	Floor Exercise
World Championships
Gold medal – first place	1954 Rome	Team
Bronze medal – third place	1954 Rome	Floor Exercise

Maria Kondratyevna Gorokhovskaya (Russian: Мария Кондратьевна Гороховская, Ukrainian: Марія Кіндратівна Гороховська; 17 October 1921 – 22 July 2001) was a Soviet gymnast of Jewish descent. At the 1952 Summer Olympics, she was the first woman to win seven medals at one Olympics. That is the highest number of medals won by a woman in a single Olympics, which is an achievement shared by only one other female athlete, the Australian swimmer Emma McKeon, who achieved that at the 2020 Summer Olympics held in 2021.

Competing for Budivelnyk Kharkov, Gorokhovskaya won her first USSR title on the balance beam in 1948. She came to the Helsinki Olympics as the twofold national champion. Soviet gymnastics had never competed at major international tournaments before, and it was the first Olympics in which the country participated.

The Soviet gymnasts dominated the competition, with Gorokhovskaya leading them. In all four individual apparatus events – the balance beam, floor exercise, the vault and the uneven bars – Gorokhovskaya finished second. This performance earned her the gold medal in the all-around competition, finishing ahead of team-mate Nina Bocharova by eight tenths of a point.

With seven of the eight Soviet gymnasts finishing in the top ten, it was clear that the team gold medal would go to them. Gorokhovskaya won her seventh medal in the now discontinued team exercise with portable apparatus, where the Soviet team finished second behind Sweden.

Gorokhovskaya made one more international appearance as a part of the winning Soviet team at the 1954 World Championships, and retired afterwards. She then worked as a judge (international since 1964) and a lecturer.

In 1990, Gorokhovskaya, who was Jewish, emigrated to Israel, where she worked as a gymnastics coach until her death. In 1991 she was inducted into the International Jewish Sports Hall of Fame.

== Achievements (non-Olympic) ==
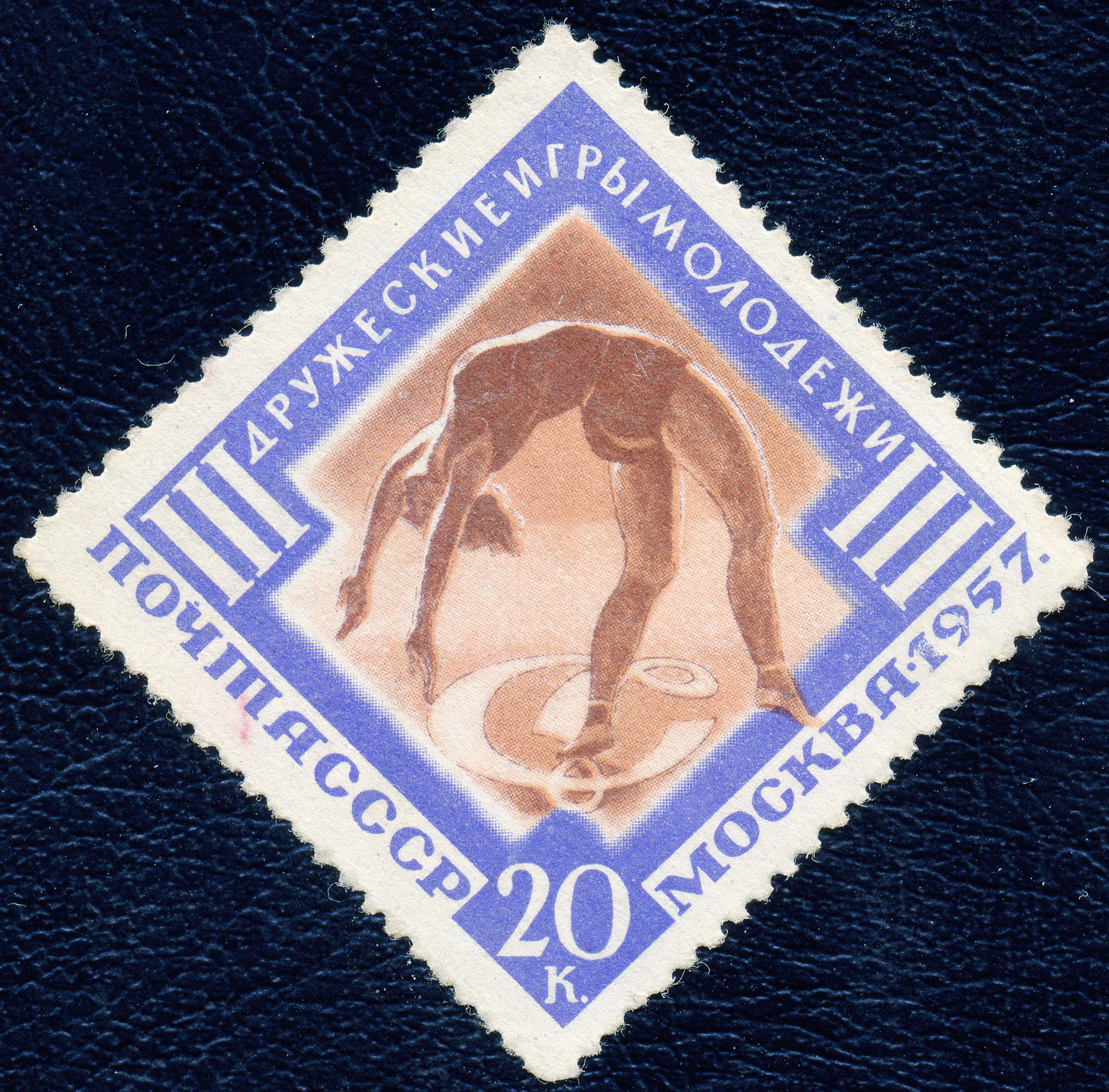
Gorokhovskaya on a Soviet stamp of 1957

Year	Event	AA	Team	VT	UB	BB	FX	RG	HB
1947	USSR Championships	2nd							
1948	USSR Championships				2nd	1st			
1949	USSR Championships	3rd				3rd		2nd	1st
1950	USSR Championships	2nd		3rd		3rd		3rd	1st
1951	USSR Championships	1st		3rd		2nd	1st		
1952	USSR Championships	1st		3rd	1st	2nd	1st		
1953	USSR Championships				1st				
1954	World Championships		1st				3rd		
1954	USSR Championships	2nd						1st	

== See also ==
- List of multiple Olympic medalists at a single Games
- List of Olympic female gymnasts for the Soviet Union
- List of select Jewish gymnasts
- List of top Olympic gymnastics medalists
