= Aleksey Zhigalov =

Russian Olympic diver

Aleksey Petrovich Zhigalov
Personal information
- Nationality: Soviet
- Born: 25 February 1915 Kazan, Russian Empire
- Died: 7 July 1963 (aged 48) Moscow, Russian SFSR, Soviet Union
- Life partner: Lyubov Zhigalova

Sport
- Country: Soviet Union
- Sport: Diving
- Club: Dynamo Moscow

Aleksey Petrovich Zhigalov (Russian: Алексей Петрович Жигалов, 25 February 1915 – 7 July 1963) was a Soviet diver. He competed in the 3 m springboard at the 1952 Summer Olympics and finished in eighth place. He won 17 national titles in the springboard (1934, 1936, 1937, 1943–1949) and platform (1934, 1936, 1937, 1946–1947, 1950, 1952). His wife, Lyubov Zhigalova, also competed in the springboard at the 1952 Olympics.
