= Margarita Nikolaeva =

Soviet gymnast

- Born: 23 September 1935 Ivanovo, Russian SFSR, Soviet Union
- Died: 21 December 1993 (aged 58) Odesa, Ukraine

Gymnastics career
- Discipline: Women's artistic gymnastics
- Country represented: Soviet Union
Medal record
Representing Soviet Union
Olympic Games
Gold medal – first place	1960 Rome	Vault
Gold medal – first place	1960 Rome	Team

Margarita Nikolaeva (23 September 1935 – 21 December 1993) was a Soviet gymnast. She competed at the 1960 Summer Olympics in Rome where she received a gold medal on vault (result - 19.316), and also a gold medal with the Soviet team (result - 382.320).
