= Juozas Ūdras =

Lithuanian fencer

Personal information
- Born: 14 February 1925 Žvikai, Lithuania
- Died: 24 May 1991 (aged 66)

Sport
- Sport: Fencing

Juozas Ūdras (14 February 1925 – 24 May 1991) was a Lithuanian-Soviet Olympic fencer. He competed in the individual and team épée events at the 1952 and 1956 Summer Olympics.

He was a five-time Lithuanian champion in épée and a two-time champion in foil.
