= Medea Jugeli =

Georgian artistic gymnast (1925–2016)

Personal information
- Born: August 1, 1925 Kutaisi, Georgian SSR, Soviet Union
- Died: January 8, 2016 (aged 90) Tbilisi, Georgia

Sport
- Sport: Artistic gymnastics
- Club: Dynamo Tbilisi
Medal record
Representing the Soviet Union
Olympic Games
Gold medal – first place	1952 Helsinki	Team allround
Silver medal – second place	1952 Helsinki	Team portable apparatus

Medeya "Mzia" Jugeli (Georgian: მედეა ჯუღელი, Russian: Медея Николаевна Джугели; August 1, 1925 – January 8, 2016) was a Georgian artistic gymnast. She competed at the 1952 Summer Olympics, finishing within the top 15 in all artistic gymnastics events, and winning one gold and one silver medal. She won seven national titles in the vault, in 1946, 1947 and 1951–1955. After retirement she worked as a gymnastics coach. She died in Tbilisi in 2016, aged 90.
