= Galina Shamrai =

Soviet gymnast (1931–2022)

- Full name: Galina Yakovlevna Shamrai
- Born: October 5, 1931 Tashkent, Uzbek SSR, Soviet Union
- Died: February 12, 2022 (aged 90)

Gymnastics career
- Discipline: Women's artistic gymnastics
- Country represented: Soviet Union
Medal record
Olympic Games
Gold medal – first place	1952 Helsinki	Team
Silver medal – second place	1952 Helsinki	Team PA
World Championships
Gold medal – first place	1954 Rome	Team
Gold medal – first place	1954 Rome	All-around
Silver medal – second place	1954 Rome	Uneven bars

Galina Yakovlevna Shamray (Russian: Гали́на Я́ковлевна Шамра́й) (also known as Galina Rudko, Galina Ilyina after marriages; October 5, 1931 – February 12, 2022) was a retired Soviet gymnast. In 1954, she became the first women's all-around World Champion from the USSR.

== Personal life ==
Shamrai was born on October 5, 1931, in Tashkent, USSR. She graduated from the Lenin Pedagogical Institute of the Moscow Region. She married Anatoli Ilyin, who played for Spartak and became an Olympic champion in football at the 1956 Summer Olympics.

== Career ==
Shamrai trained at the Iskra club and later at the Burevestnik sports society in Moscow. She began competing at the USSR Championships in 1950, where she placed eighth in the all-around. She was added to the team roster for the 1952 Summer Olympics, which was the first Olympic performance for Soviet athletes. Shamrai did not compete in the event finals, but was 8th in the all-around, contributing to the team's gold. She also won the team's silver in the portable apparatus event. In December of the same year, Shamrai earned the silver medal on the floor exercise at the USSR Championships. She placed fourth in the all-around at the Nationals in 1953.

At the 1954 World Championships she won the all-around title, a gold medal in the team competition, a silver on bars and the team's silver in the portable apparatus. She earned one more gold medal on the balance beam, at the 1955 Nationals, and retired in 1956. In 1957, Shamrai was awarded the Order of the Badge of Honor. She worked as a coach at the Spartak club in Moscow and began judging at international gymnastics events in 1975.

== Achievements (non-Olympic) ==
Year	Event	AA	Team	Team PA	VT	UB	BB	FX	R
1952	USSR Championships							2nd	
1954	World Championships	1st	1st	2nd		2nd			
1954	USSR Championships	3rd							3rd
1955	USSR Championships						1st		
1956	USSR Championships						2nd		
