= Galina Minaicheva =

Soviet gymnast (1929–2025)

Personal information
- Born: 29 December 1929 Moscow, Russian SFSR, USSR
- Died: 28 January 2025 (aged 95) Tbilisi, Georgia
- Height: 1.58 m (5 ft 2 in)
- Weight: 56 kg (123 lb)

Sport
- Sport: Artistic gymnastics
- Club: Dynamo Moscow; Dynamo Tbilisi
Medal record
Representing the Soviet Union
Olympic Games
Gold medal – first place	1952 Helsinki	Team
Silver medal – second place	1952 Helsinki	Team PA
Bronze medal – third place	1952 Helsinki	Vault
World Championships
Gold medal – first place	1954 Rome	Team

Galina Yakovlevna Minaicheva (Russian: Галина Яковлевна Минаичева; 29 December 1929 – 28 January 2025) was a Soviet artistic gymnast. She competed at the 1952 Summer Olympics, finishing within the first 10 in all artistic gymnastics events, and winning one gold, one silver and one bronze medal.

== Biography ==
Minaicheva married a Georgian man and moved to Tbilisi, changing her last name to Sharabidze (Russian: Шарабидзе). Under this name she won a team gold medal at the 1954 World Artistic Gymnastics Championships. In 1957 she graduated from the Institute of Physical Education in Tbilisi and worked as a gymnastics coach.

Minaicheva died in Tbilisi, Georgia on 28 January 2025, at the age of 95.
