= Ekaterina Kalinchuk =

Soviet gymnast

Personal information
- Born: 2 December 1922 Zhitovo, Tula Oblast, Russian SFSR
- Died: 13 July 1997 (aged 74) Moscow, Russia

Gymnastics career
- Discipline: Women's artistic gymnastics
- Country represented: Soviet Union
Medal record
Olympic Games
Gold medal – first place	1952 Helsinki	Vault
Silver medal – second place	1952 Helsinki	Team exercises with portable apparatus

Ekaterina Illarionovna Kalinchuk (née Dyomina; Russian: Екатерина Илларионовна Калинчук (Дёмина); 2 December 1922 – 13 July 1997) was a Soviet gymnast. She competed at the 1952 Summer Olympics in Helsinki, where she was a non-scoring member of the gold-winning Soviet team. Individually she won a gold medal in the vault and a silver in the now-discontinued team portable apparatus event.
