= Lebanon at the 1952 Summer Olympics =

- IOC code: LIB
- NOC: Lebanese Olympic Committee

in Helsinki, Finland
- Competitors: 9 in 4 sports
- Medals Ranked 32nd: Gold 0 Silver 1 Bronze 1 Total 2

Summer Olympics appearances (overview)
- 1948; 1952; 1956; 1960; 1964; 1968; 1972; 1976; 1980; 1984; 1988; 1992; 1996; 2000; 2004; 2008; 2012; 2016; 2020; 2024

Lebanon competed at the 1952 Summer Olympics in Helsinki, Finland, which was held from 19 July to 3 August 1952. This was the country's second appearance in a Summer Olympic Games, following their debut at the 1948 edition. The Lebanese delegation consisted of nine male competitors: boxer Sarkis Moussa, shooters Abdel Sattar Tarabulsi, Khalil Hilmi, and Abdullah Jaroudi Sr., weightlifter Moustafa Laham, and wrestlers Zakaria Chihab, Safi Taha, Khalil Taha, and Michel Skaff.

With Chihab's silver medal in the Greco-Roman bantamweight competition and Khalil Taha's bronze in the Greco-Roman welterweight competition, Lebanon won their first medals in its Olympic history during these Games. In other events, Moussa lost his first round bout in the light welterweight boxing competition, Tarabulsi finished 29th in the 50 metre pistol event, while Hilmi finished 46th in the same event, with Jaroudi finishing 50th in the 50 metre rifle, prone event. Laham finished fifth in the 75 kg weightlifting competition, Safi Taha finished seventh in the Greco-Roman featherweight competition, and Skaff finished sixth in the Greco-Roman light heavyweight event. To date, this is the only Olympic Games in which Lebanon has recorded multiple medals.

== Background ==
The Lebanese Olympic Committee was founded in 1946 and officially recognised by the International Olympic Committee on 22 November 1947. A few months later, the nation made its debut in the 1948 Winter Olympics in St. Moritz, Switzerland. Their debut in a Summer Olympics also came at the 1948 edition in London. As such, their appearance in the 1952 Helsinki Games marked their second Summer Games appearance.

At the 1948 Games, IOC representative Muhammed Taher Pasha of Egypt proposed the idea of the Mediterranean Games, open to all countries bordering the Mediterranean Sea. Gaining IOC approval, the first Games occurred in 1951 in Alexandria, Egypt, from 5 to 20 October. Ten countries participated, with Lebanon included. Lebanon tallied 19 medals: five silver and 14 bronze. Six Lebanese Mediterranean Games representatives participated in the 1952 Summer Games: boxer Sarkis Moussa, shooter Abdel Sattar Tarabulsi, weightlifter Moustafa Laham, and wrestlers Zakaria Chihab, Khalil Taha, and Michel Skaff.

The Helsinki Games, which took place from 19 July to 3 August 1952, hosted 4,955 athletes in 149 events from 69 different nations. The delegation arrived in Helsinki on 15 July, and consisted of 13 men: 9 athletes and 4 officials, who were housed in building 7 of the Olympic Village in Käpylä, with the delegations from Burma, India, Jamaica, Finland, Uruguay, Mexico, Venezuela, Spain, and Greece. Their appointed attaché was Jean-Pierre Rengaldier.

== Medalists ==
The following Lebanese athletes won medals at the Games, the first in the country's Olympic history. With a silver medal and a bronze, Lebanon finished in 32nd place on the overall medal table, tied with Austria. To date, this is the only multi-medal Olympic Games in Lebanon's history of attendance.

Medal	Name	Sport	Event	Date
Silver	Zakaria Chihab	Wrestling	Men's Greco-Roman bantamweight	27 July
Bronze	Khalil Taha	Wrestling	Men's Greco-Roman welterweight	27 July

== Boxing ==
One year removed from his bronze medal finish at the Mediterranean Games, Sarkis Moussa was the sole boxing representative at the Games. He competed in the light welterweight competition. On 28 July at the Messuhalli, Moussa faced Juan Curet of Puerto Rico. Moussa was knocked out in the second round of the bout, eliminating him from the tournament, placing him tied for 17th place. The gold medal was won by Charles Adkins of the United States.

Athlete	Event	First Round	Second Round	Third Round	Semi-final	Final	
Athlete	Event	Opposition Result	Opposition Result	Opposition Result	Opposition Result	Opposition Result	Rank
Sarkis Moussa	Light welterweight	Curet (PUR); L by knockout	Did not advance				17

== Shooting ==
Three shooters represented Lebanon at the Games. Abdel Sattar Tarabulsi, bronze medalist at the Mediterranean Games in the 50 metre free pistol, and Khalil Hilmi, who previously participated in the 25 metre rapid fire pistol and the 50 metre pistol events at the 1948 Games, represented the nation in the 50 metre pistol event on 25 July at the Malmi shooting range. Competitors took six series of ten shots, with each shot being scored out of 10, meaning that the highest possible score was 600 points. Tarabulsi got 87 points in the first series, 83 in the second, 86 in the third, 87 in the fourth, 84 in the fifth, and 90 in the sixth, making his total score 517 points, placing 29th out of the field of 48. Hilmi got 82 points in the first series, 80 in the second, 78 in the third, 84 in the fourth, 87 in the fifth, and 78 in the sixth, for a total of 489 points, placing 46th. The event was won by Huelet Benner of the United States.

Abdullah Jaroudi Sr. participated in the 50 metre rifle, prone event held on 29 July at the Malmi range. Competitors took four series of ten shots, with each shot being scored out of ten, for a highest possible total score of 400 points. Jaroudi got 96 points in all four rounds, for a total of 384 points. With his 19 ten-point shots acting as a tiebreaker, Jaroudi placed 50th in the field of 58. Iosif Sîrbu of Romania won the gold medal in the event.

Athlete	Event	Final	
Athlete	Event	Points	Rank
Abdel Sattar Tarabulsi	50 metre pistol	517	29
Khalil Hilmi	50 metre pistol	489	46
Abdullah Jaroudi Sr.	50 metre rifle, prone	384	50

== Weightlifting ==
Moustafa Laham, silver medalist in the 75 kg weightlifting division at the 1951 Mediterranean Games, was the sole weightlifter for Lebanon at the Games. Weighing in at 73 kilograms, he competed in the men's 75 kg competition on 26 July at the Messuhalli. In the press, Laham lifted 107.5 kilograms in his first attempt, 112.5 in his second, and 115 in his third, making 115 kilograms his official result, the fifth-highest press result in the competition. In the snatch, Laham lifted 112.5 kilograms in his first attempt, failed 117.5 in his second, and failed 120 in his third, making his official result 112.5 kilograms, the sixth-highest snatch total in the competition. In the final event, the clean and jerk, Laham failed 142.5 kilograms in his first attempt before successfully lifting in his second attempt, while failing 150 in his third attempt, posting an official mark of 142.5 kilograms, the sixth-highest clean and jerk mark in the competition. His combined total of 370 kilograms was good for a fifth-place finish in the field of 21, 30 kilograms shy of the new Olympic record set by gold medal-winner Pete George of the United States.

Athlete	Event	Press (kg)	Snatch (kg)	Clean & Jerk (kg)	Total	Rank
Athlete	Event	Result	Result	Result	Total	Rank
Moustafa Laham	75 kg	115	112.5	142.5	370	5

== Wrestling ==
Four wrestlers represented Lebanon during the 1952 Summer Games, where all events were held at the Messuhalli. Zakaria Chihab, bronze medalist at the Greco-Roman 57kg competition at the Mediterranean Games, participated in the Greco-Roman bantamweight competition. In the first round on 24 July, Chihab defeated Ion Popescu of Romania by unanimous decision. The following day in the second round, he defeated Maurice Faure of France by split decision. In the third round on 26 July, Chihab defeated Arvo Kyllönen of Finland by unanimous decision. Later on that day, he received a bye in the fourth round. In his fifth round matchup against Imre Hódos of Hungary on 27 July, Chihab lost by split decision. Despite the loss, Chihab was among the final three wrestlers, with Hódos and Artem Teryan of the Soviet Union. Under the rules of the competition, the three wrestlers would compete in a round-robin style tournament, with Chihab's result against Hódos carrying over. In his match against Teryan, Chihab won by split decision, securing the silver medal, with Hódos winning gold and Teryan winning bronze.

Safi Taha returned to the Greco-Roman featherweight competition after competing in the same event in 1948. Taha received a bye through the first round on 24 July. In his first bout in the second round on 25 July, Taha defeated Marco Antonio Girón of Guatemala by fall in two minutes, thirty-five seconds. In the third round on 26 July, Taha was defeated by Yakiv Punkin of the Soviet Union by unanimous decision. After the bout, Taha withdrew from the competition, ultimately finishing seventh. Punkin was the eventual gold medal winner.

Khalil Taha, Safi's brother and silver medalist at the Greco-Roman 73 kg competition at the Mediterranean Games, represented the nation in the Greco-Roman welterweight event. On 24 July, he won his first round bout against Heng Freylinger of Luxembourg by unanimous decision. He also won his second round bout against René Chesneau of France on 25 July, by fall in five minutes, fifteen seconds. He then won in the third round on 26 July against Gottfried Anglberger of Austria by unanimous decision. Taha suffered his first loss in the fourth round on 27 July, when Miklós Szilvási of Hungary defeated him by fall in nine minutes. He was among the top three wrestlers at the end of the round, allowing him to participate in the round robin tournament for medal placement. His bout against Szilvási carried over, while in the fifth round, he was defeated by Gösta Andersson of Sweden by unanimous decision. With those two losses, Taha placed third, winning the bronze medal.

Michel Skaff, bronze medalist in the Greco-Roman 87 kg competition at the Mediterranean Games, participated in the Greco-Roman light heavyweight competition. On 24 July, Skaff defeated Ovidiu Forai of Romania by split decision in the first round. In the second round on 25 July, Skaff was defeated by fall by Gyula Kovács of Hungary in ten minutes, forty seconds. In the third round on 26 July, Skaff was again defeated by fall, this time by Swede Karl-Erik Nilsson in four minutes, forty seconds. With that elimination, Skaff was eliminated, placing sixth. Kelpo Gröndahl of Finland won the gold medal.

Key:

- VT – Victory by fall.
- VB – Victory by injury (VF for forfeit, VA for withdrawal or disqualification)
- PP – Decision by points – the loser with technical points.
- PO – Decision by points – the loser without technical points.

Athlete	Event	Round 1	Round 2	Round 3	Round 4	Round 5	Round 6	Rank
Zakaria Chihab	Greco-Roman bantamweight	Popescu (ROU); W 3-0^{PO}	Faure (FRA); W 2-1^{PP}	Kyllönen (FIN); W 3-0^{PO}	Bye	Hódos (HUN); L 1-2^{PP}	Teryan (URS); W 2-1^{PP}	Silver
Safi Taha	Greco-Roman featherweight	Bye	Girón (GUA); W^{VT}	Punkin (URS); L 0-3^{PO}	Did not advance			7
Khalil Taha	Greco-Roman welterweight	Freylinger (LUX); W 3-0^{PO}	Chesneau (FRA); W^{VT}	Anglberger (AUT); W 3-0^{PO}	Szilvási (HUN); L^{VT}	Andersson (SWE); L 0-3^{PO}	-	Bronze
Michel Skaff	Greco-Roman light heavyweight	Forai (ROU); W 2-1^{PP}	Kovács (HUN); L^{VT}	Nilsson (SWE); L^{VT}	Did not advance			6
