= Deaths in November 1994 =

The following is a list of notable deaths in November 1994.

Entries for each day are listed alphabetically by surname. A typical entry lists information in the following sequence:

- Name, age, country of citizenship at birth, subsequent country of citizenship (if applicable), reason for notability, cause of death (if known), and reference.

== November 1994 ==
=== 1 ===
- Noah Beery Jr., 81, American actor (The Rockford Files, Red River, Hondo), thrombosis.
- Richard Krautheimer, 97, German art historian.
- Elliot Lillico, 89, Australian politician.
- Enrique Pérez, 97, Spanish Olympic rower (1924).

=== 2 ===
- David B. Feinberg, 37, American writer and AIDS activist, AIDS-related complications.
- Grisha Filipov, 75, Bulgarian communist politician.
- Joe Gould, 85, Australian rower and Olympian (1936).
- Stanley Ndunduma, 31, Zimbabwean footballer (national team).
- John Nimmo, 84, New Zealand cricketer.
- Harold Pearson, 86, English football player.
- John Pearson, 68, British Olympic sports shooter (1952).
- Richard Pottier, 88, Austrian-French film director.
- Frank Shamel, 81, American basketball player.
- Martin Taras, 80, American cartoonist.
- Peter Matthew Hillsman Taylor, 77, American novelist, short story writer, and playwright.

=== 3 ===
- Ivo Battelli, 90, Italian architect and set decorator.
- Rudolf Eisenmenger, 92, Austrian artist.
- Valter Palm, 88, Estonian boxer and Olympian (1924, 1928).
- Archibald Stinchcombe, 81, English ice hockey player and Olympian (1936, 1948).
- Peter Wilenski, 55, Australian public servant and ambassador, lymphatic cancer.
- Ralph Walter Graystone Wyckoff, 97, American scientist and X-ray crystallography pioneer.

=== 4 ===
- Ku. Ma. Balasubramaniam, 74, Indian writer and poet.
- George Bradshaw, 70, American baseball player (Washington Senators).
- Sam Francis, 71, American artist, prostate cancer.
- Onofrio Fusco, 75, Italian football player and manager.
- Ashish Kumar Louho, 57, Bangladeshi film actor, playwright, dialogue writer and story writer.
- Ermes Muccinelli, 67, Italian football player.
- Fred "Sonic" Smith, 46, American musician, heart attack.
- Carlos Thompson, 69-70, Mexican Olympic footballer (1948).
- Speed Webb, 88, American jazz drummer and territory band leader.

=== 5 ===
- Patrick Dean, 85, British diplomat and ambassador.
- Gene Desautels, 87, American baseball player.
- Joe Hague, 50, American baseball player (St. Louis Cardinals, Cincinnati Reds), cancer.
- Johan Heyns, 66, South African theologian, homicide.
- Tim McNamara, 95, American baseball player (Boston Braves, New York Giants).
- Milan Mladenović, 36, Serbian musician, pancreatic cancer.
- William O'Brien, 76, Irish Fine Gael politician.
- Albert Shesternyov, 53, Russian football player and manager, liver cirrhosis.
- Frédéric Vandewalle, 82, Belgian colonel and diplomat in the Belgian Congo.

=== 6 ===
- Erv Dusak, 74, American baseball player (St. Louis Cardinals, Pittsburgh Pirates).
- Fernando de Santiago y Díaz, 84, Spanish politician and interim prime minister.
- Dean Gallo, 58, American politician and businessman, member of the United States House of Representatives (1985- ), prostate cancer.
- Jørgen Johansen, 66, Danish Olympic football player (1952).
- Edvard Natvig, 87, Norwegian Olympic athlete (1936).
- Vladimir Zagorovsky, 69, Russian chess grandmaster.

=== 7 ===
- Almer Hall, 81, English football player and manager.
- Ebrahim Maka, 72, Indian cricket player.
- Charles Mathiesen, 83, Norwegian speed skater and Olympian (1936, 1948).
- Shorty Rogers, 70, American West coast jazz trumpeter, flugelhornist, and arranger, cancer.
- Archie San Romani, 82, American middle-distance runner and Olympian (1936).
- Dave Simmons, 51, American football player (St. Louis Cardinals, New Orleans Saints, Dallas Cowboys).
- Arthur Sulley, 87, British rower and Olympian (1928).
- Bob Vance, 69, New Zealand cricketer.
- Carleton Young, 89, American actor, stroke.

=== 8 ===
- Bill Davis, 77, American football player (Chicago Cardinals, Brooklyn Dodgers, Miami Seahawks).
- Viktoria Dimitrova, 18, Bulgarian figure skater and Olympian (1992).
- George Herring, 61, American gridiron football player (Denver Broncos).
- Michael O'Donoghue, 54, American actor and writer (Saturday Night Live), cerebrovascular disease.
- Marianne Straub, 85, British textile designer.
- Alexander Webster, 60, South African Olympic boxer (1952, 1956).

=== 9 ===
- Jim Brown, 85, American soccer player.
- Erling Christophersen, 96, Norwegian botanist, geographer and diplomat.
- Azumanishiki Eizaburo, 54, Japanese sumo wrestler.
- Ralph Michael, 87, English actor (Empire of the Sun, Grand Prix, Compact).
- Priscilla Morrill, 67, American actress (Santa Barbara, The Mary Tyler Moore Show, Newhart), kidney disease.
- Richard Rust, 56, American actor (Sam Benedict), heart attack.
- Pēteris Zeltiņš, 80, Soviet Latvian Olympic racewalker (1952).

=== 10 ===
- William Higinbotham, 84, American physicist.
- Carmen McRae, 74, American jazz singer, stroke.
- Louis Nizer, 92, American trial lawyer.
- Zuleykha Seyidmammadova, 75, Azerbaijani female pilot.

=== 11 ===
- Stephen Dykes Bower, 91, British church architect and Gothic Revival designer.
- Ernest Clark, 82, British actor (Doctor in the House, The Dam Busters, Gandhi).
- Dina Gralla, 89, German film actress (Madame Wants No Children).
- Mikhail Krivonosov, 65, Soviet/Belarusian hammer thrower and Olympian (1952, 1956).
- Kuvempu, 89, Indian poet, playwright, novelist and critic.
- Elizabeth Maconchy, 87, Irish-English composer.
- Ed Madjeski, 86, American baseball player (Philadelphia Athletics, Chicago White Sox, New York Giants).
- Bob Miner, 52, American businessman, mesothelioma.
- Wanda Osiris, 89, Italian revue soubrette, actress and singer.
- Christian Pravda, 67, Austrian alpine ski racer and Olympian (1948, 1952).
- Rachel Saint, 80, American evangelical Christian missionary, cancer.
- Caroline Smith, 88, American Olympic diver (1924).
- Charles Henry Tenney, 83, American district judge (United States District Court for the Southern District of New York).
- John Anthony Volpe, 85, American businessman, diplomat, and politician.
- Dieter Wiedenmann, 37, German Olympic rower (1984).
- Cecil Wylde, 90, British Olympic ice hockey player (1928).
- Pedro Zamora, 22, Cuban-American AIDS educator and television personality, AIDS-related complications.
- Tadeusz Żychiewicz, 72, Polish journalist, art historian, publicist, and theologist.

=== 12 ===
- Atanas Komchev, 35, Bulgarian wrestler and Olympic champion (1988, 1992), traffic collision.
- Louis Hendrik Potgieter, 43, South African lead singer of Dschinghis Khan, AIDS.
- Onni Rajasaari, 84, Finnish long and triple jumper, Olympian (1932, 1936).
- Gord Reid, 84, Canadian ice hockey player (New York Americans).
- Elmer Ernest Roper, 101, Canadian businessman, trade unionist and politician.
- Wilma Rudolph, 54, American sprinter and Olympian (1956, 1960), brain cancer.
- Soetjipto Soentoro, 53, Indonesian football player.
- J. I. M. Stewart, 88, Scottish novelist and academic.

=== 13 ===
- Mehrdad Bahar, 64, Iranian Iranist, linguist, mythologist and Persian historian.
- Jack Baker, 47, American actor, bladder cancer.
- Daniel Camargo Barbosa, 64, Colombian serial killer, stabbed.
- Lucien Claes, 71, Belgian Olympic wrestler (1952).
- John Bishop Harman, 87, British physician, aortic dissection.
- Volodymyr Ivashko, 62, Soviet/Ukrainian politician.
- Motoo Kimura, 70, Japanese biologist, cerebral hemorrhage.
- Igor Platonov, 60, Soviet/Ukrainian chess player, homicide.

=== 14 ===
- Humphry Berkeley, 68, British politician and author.
- Nicholas Bianco, 62, American mobster and member of the Patriarca crime family, ALS.
- René Konen, 73, Luxembourgish politician and government minister.
- Dick Poillon, 74, American gridiron football player (Washington Redskins).
- Francis Frederick Reh, 83, American Roman Catholic bishop.
- Tom Villard, 40, American actor (We Got It Made, My Girl, Heartbreak Ridge), AIDS-related pneumonia.

=== 15 ===
- Janet Ahlberg, 50, British children's writer and illustrator, breast cancer.
- Pol Braekman, 74, Belgian sprinter and Olympian (1948).
- Leandro Locsin, 66, Filipino architect, artist, and interior designer.
- Eugène Marquis, 93, Canadian politician, member of the House of Commons of Canada (1945-1949).
- Elizabeth George Speare, 85, American writer of children's books, aortic aneurysm.
- James W. Watts, 90, American neurosurgeon.

=== 16 ===
- Ron Hall, 73, Australian rules footballer.
- Eduard Kozynkevych, 45, Ukrainian football player.
- Russ Meers, 75, American baseball player (Chicago Cubs).
- Buster Poole, 79, American gridiron football player (New York Giants, Chicago Cardinals).
- Chet Powers, 57, American singer-songwriter.
- Doris Speed, 95, English actress (Coronation Street).

=== 17 ===
- Theodore Robert Dudley, 57, American botanist, cancer.
- Edgar Hennig, 97, American baseball player and American football coach.
- Heinz-Georg Lemm, 75, German Bundeswehr general.
- Mohammed Kadhim al-Qazwini, 64, Iranian-Iraqi Shia scholar, poet and orator.
- Eddie Picken, 87, Early American basketball player.

=== 18 ===
- Maurice Auslander, 68, American mathematician.
- Ronaldo Bôscoli, 66, Brazilian composer, songwriter, record producer and journalist, prostate cancer.
- Cab Calloway, 86, American jazz singer, dancer, bandleader and actor, stroke.
- Bob Dykstra, 72, American basketball player.
- Nathan Fine, 78, American mathematician.
- Anselm Franz, 94, Austrian jet engine pioneer.
- George Harris, 88, English cricketer.
- Ruurd Dirk Hoogland, 72, Dutch-Australian botanist, explorer and naturalist.
- Charles Hucker, 75, American historian.
- Michael Somes, 77, English ballet dancer, brain cancer.
- Herbert Taschner, 68, German film editor.

=== 19 ===
- Erwin Griswold, 90, American lawyer.
- Bipin Chandra Joshi, 58, 17th Indian Army officer and Chief of Staff.
- Julian Symons, 82, British crime writer and poet.
- Charles Umlauf, 83, American sculptor and teacher.

=== 20 ===
- T. Carmi, 68, American-Israeli poet.
- Stacy Errickson, 22, American nurse technician.
- Tsuneari Fukuda, 82, Japanese dramatist, translator, and literary critic.
- Jānis Krūmiņš, 64, Soviet-Latvian basketball player.
- John Lucarotti, 68, British-Canadian screenwriter and author.
- Lakshmi N. Menon, 95, Indian freedom fighter and politician.
- Bert Wright, 67, Australian cricketer.

=== 21 ===
- Malcolm Adiseshiah, 84, Indian development economist and educator.
- Thomas Kuchel, 84, American politician, member of the United States Senate (1953-1969).
- Pino Locchi, 69, Italian actor and voice actor.
- Willem Jacob Luyten, 95, Dutch-American astronomer, heart failure.
- Ib Nielsen, 75, Danish Olympic fencer (1948, 1952).
- Juancho Rois, 35, Colombian accordionist, plane crash.

=== 22 ===
- Norma Donaldson, 66, American actress (The Young and the Restless, 9 to 5, Poetic Justice) and singer, cancer.
- Ryszard Kucjas, 71, Polish Olympic gymnast (1952).
- Minni Nurme, 77, Estonian writer.
- Viola Spolin, 88, American theatre academic, educator and acting coach.
- Charles Upham, 86, New Zealand soldier and recipient of the Victoria Cross.

=== 23 ===
- Austen Albu, 91, British politician.
- Art Barr, 28, American professional wrestler, heart attack caused by a drug overdose.
- Jim Hallahan Jr., 82, Australian rules footballer.
- Erick Hawkins, 85, American modern-dance choreographer and dancer.
- Irwin Kostal, 83, American film musical arranger musical orchestrator
- Garry Middleton, 46, Australian motorcycle speedway rider.
- Alberto Natusch, 61, Bolivian general, cancer.
- Hubert Negele, 75, Liechtensteiner Olympic alpine skier (1936).
- David Neves, 56, Brazilian film director and screenwriter.
- Edith Nielsen, 88, Danish Olympic diver (1924, 1928).
- John Tveiten, 61, Norwegian Olympic wrestler (1960).

=== 24 ===
- Mohammad Ali Araki, 99, Iranian Grand Ayatollah.
- Chet Benefiel, 87, American football and basketball coach.
- Aleksandr Gusev, 39, Soviet/Russian Olympic field hockey player (1980).
- Ivo Perilli, 92, Italian screenwriter, stroke.
- George Douglas-Hamilton, 10th Earl of Selkirk, 88, Scottish nobleman and Conservative politician.
- Milton Shapp, 82, American politician and governor of Pennsylvania, Alzheimer's disease.

=== 25 ===
- Brad Trumbull, 70, American actor.
- Gheorghe Vitanidis, 65, Romanian film director.
- Johanna von Trapp, 75, Austrian singer and member of the Trapp Family Singers, stroke.
- John Charles Walker, 101, American agricultural scientist.
- Irene Clark Woodman, 79, United States Army Nurse Corps officer.

=== 26 ===
- Christiana Abiodun Emanuel, 87, Nigerian religious leader.
- Numa Andoire, 86, French football player and manager.
- David Bache, 69, British automobile designer.
- Magnus Cormack, 88, Australian politician.
- Arturo Rivera y Damas, 71, Salvadoran Roman Catholic archbishop.
- Robert Fendler, 73, Austrian Olympic footballer (1952).
- Bhalji Pendharkar, 97, Indian film director and producer.
- Joey Stefano, 26, American pornographic actor, drug overdose.
- William H. Timbers, 79, American judge.
- Omer Vanaudenhove, 80, Belgian politician, mayor and minister.
- José María Zaragoza, 81, Filipino architect.

=== 27 ===
- Harald Christensen, 87, Danish Olympic cyclist (1932).
- Per Federspiel, 89, Danish politician.
- Renate Haußleiter-Malluche, 77, German politician.
- Tom Johnston, 75, Scottish football player and manager.
- Fernando Lopes-Graça, 87, Portuguese composer, conductor and musicologist.
- Glen Moulder, 77, American baseball player (Brooklyn Dodgers, St. Louis Browns, Chicago White Sox).
- Rufina Nifontova, 63, Soviet/Russian theater and film actress.
- Leonard Ravenhill, 87, English Christian evangelist and author.

=== 28 ===
- Winston Arnow, 83, American district judge (United States District Court for the Northern District of Florida).
- Charles Howard, 12th Earl of Carlisle, 71, English nobleman, politician, and peer.
- Jeffrey Dahmer, 34, American serial killer and sex offender, beaten to death.
- Buster Edwards, 63, British criminal, suicide.
- Franco Fortini, 77, Italian author, essayist, literary critic and Marxist intellectual.
- Wolfgang Haack, 92, German mathematician and aerodynamicist.
- Rudolf Johansson, 95, Swedish Olympic middle-distance runner (1924).
- Karl Kerbach, 76, Austrian football player.
- Vic Legley, 79, French-Belgian violist and composer of classical music.
- Al Levitt, 62, American jazz drummer.
- Rikki Neave, 6, British murder victim.
- Otilio Olguín, 63, Mexican swimmer and Olympic water polo player (1952).
- Ralph Olsen, 70, American football player (Green Bay Packers) and coach.
- Frank Robbins, 77, American comic book artist and writer (Batman, Johnny Hazard, Superboy), heart attack.
- Jerry Rubin, 56, American social activist, anti-war leader, and counterculture icon, traffic accident.
- Ian Serraillier, 82, English novelist and poet.
- Soulima Stravinsky, 84, Swiss-American pianist, composer and musicologist.
- Vicente Enrique y Tarancón, 87, Spanish Roman Catholic cardinal.

=== 29 ===
- William Tapley Bennett Jr., 77, American diplomat.
- Sayed El-Nahas, 55, Egyptian Olympic boxer (1960, 1964, 1968).
- Harsh Uday Singh Gaur, 41, Indian military officer, killed in action.
- Józef Karpiel, 62, Polish Olympic skier (1960).
- Don Larson, 68, American college football coach (Illinois Wesleyan University).
- Hervey Machen, 78, American politician, member of the United States House of Representatives (1965-1969).
- Titus Popovici, 64, Romanian screenwriter and author.
- Charley Smith, 57, American baseball player.
- George Bell Timmerman, 82, American politician and World War II veteran.

=== 30 ===
- Jesse Anderson, 37, American convicted murderer, beaten to death.
- Guy Debord, 62, French Marxist theorist, philosopher, and filmmaker, suicide.
- Joffre Desilets, 79, Canadian ice hockey player (Montreal Canadiens, Chicago Black Hawks).
- Louis Gabrillargues, 80, French football player.
- Connie Kay, 67, American jazz and R&B drummer.
- Lionel Stander, 86, American actor (Hart to Hart, A Star Is Born, The Transformers: The Movie), lung cancer.
- Frederick H. Wagman, 82, American librarian.
- Charles Wiard, 85, British Olympic sprinter (1936).
