= Wrestling at the 1952 Summer Olympics – Men's Greco-Roman featherweight =

Wrestling at the Olympics

Men's Greco-Roman featherweight at the Games of the XV Olympiad
- Venue: Messuhalli
- Dates: 24–27 July 1952
- Competitors: 17 from 17 nations

Medalists
1st place, gold medalist(s)		Yakiv Punkin	Soviet Union
2nd place, silver medalist(s)		Imre Polyák	Hungary
3rd place, bronze medalist(s)		Abdel Aaal Rashed	Egypt

The men's Greco-Roman featherweight competition at the 1952 Summer Olympics in Helsinki took place from 24 July to 27 July at Messuhalli. Nations were limited to one competitor. Featherweight was the third-lightest category, including wrestlers weighing 57 to 62 kilograms (125.7 to 136.7 lb).

== Competition format ==
This Greco-Roman wrestling competition continued to use the "bad points" elimination system introduced at the 1928 Summer Olympics for Greco-Roman and at the 1932 Summer Olympics for freestyle wrestling, removing the slight modification introduced in 1936 and used until 1948 (which had a reduced penalty for a loss by 2–1 decision). Each round featured all wrestlers pairing off and wrestling one bout (with one wrestler having a bye if there were an odd number). The loser received 3 points. The winner received 1 point if the win was by decision and 0 points if the win was by fall. At the end of each round, any wrestler with at least 5 points was eliminated. This elimination continued until the medal rounds, which began when 3 wrestlers remained. These 3 wrestlers each faced each other in a round-robin medal round (with earlier results counting, if any had wrestled another before); record within the medal round determined medals, with bad points breaking ties.

== Results ==
=== Round 1 ===
Bouts

Winner	Nation	Victory Type	Loser	Nation
Imre Polyák	Hungary	Fall	Marco Antonio Girón	Guatemala
Gunnar Håkansson	Sweden	Decision, 3–0	Francisc Horvath	Romania
Ernest Gondzik	Poland	Decision, 2–1	Bela Torma	Yugoslavia
Bartl Brötzner	Austria	Decision, 3–0	Lucien Claes	Belgium
Abdel Aaal Rashed	Egypt	Fall	Rolf Ellerbrock	Germany
Umberto Trippa	Italy	Decision, 2–1	Dagfin Huseby	Norway
Erkki Talosela	Finland	Decision, 3–0	Hasan Bozbey	Turkey
Yakiv Punkin	Soviet Union	Fall	Antoine Merle	France
Safi Taha	Lebanon	Bye	N/A	N/A

Points

Rank	Wrestler	Nation	Start	Earned	Total
1	Imre Polyák	Hungary	0	0	0
1	Yakiv Punkin	Soviet Union	0	0	0
1	Abdel Aaal Rashed	Egypt	0	0	0
1	Safi Taha	Lebanon	0	0	0
5	Bartl Brötzner	Austria	0	1	1
5	Ernest Gondzik	Poland	0	1	1
5	Gunnar Håkansson	Sweden	0	1	1
5	Erkki Talosela	Finland	0	1	1
5	Umberto Trippa	Italy	0	1	1
10	Hasan Bozbey	Turkey	0	3	3
10	Lucien Claes	Belgium	0	3	3
10	Rolf Ellerbrock	Germany	0	3	3
10	Marco Antonio Girón	Guatemala	0	3	3
10	Francisc Horvath	Romania	0	3	3
10	Dagfin Huseby	Norway	0	3	3
10	Antoine Merle	France	0	3	3
10	Bela Torma	Yugoslavia	0	3	3

=== Round 2 ===
Bouts

Winner	Nation	Victory Type	Loser	Nation
Safi Taha	Lebanon	Fall	Marco Antonio Girón	Guatemala
Imre Polyák	Hungary	Decision, 3–0	Gunnar Håkansson	Sweden
Ernest Gondzik	Poland	Decision, 2–1	Francisc Horvath	Romania
Bartl Brötzner	Austria	Decision, 2–1	Bela Torma	Yugoslavia
Rolf Ellerbrock	Germany	Decision, 3–0	Lucien Claes	Belgium
Abdel Aaal Rashed	Egypt	Decision, 2–1	Umberto Trippa	Italy
Erkki Talosela	Finland	Decision, 3–0	Dagfin Huseby	Norway
Hasan Bozbey	Turkey	Decision, 3–0	Antoine Merle	France
Yakiv Punkin	Soviet Union	Bye	N/A	N/A

Points

Rank	Wrestler	Nation	Start	Earned	Total
1	Yakiv Punkin	Soviet Union	0	0	0
1	Safi Taha	Lebanon	0	0	0
3	Imre Polyák	Hungary	0	1	1
3	Abdel Aaal Rashed	Egypt	0	1	1
5	Bartl Brötzner	Austria	1	1	2
5	Ernest Gondzik	Poland	1	1	2
5	Erkki Talosela	Finland	1	1	2
8	Hasan Bozbey	Turkey	3	1	4
8	Rolf Ellerbrock	Germany	3	1	4
8	Gunnar Håkansson	Sweden	1	3	4
8	Umberto Trippa	Italy	1	3	4
12	Lucien Claes	Belgium	3	3	6
12	Marco Antonio Girón	Guatemala	3	3	6
12	Francisc Horvath	Romania	3	3	6
12	Dagfin Huseby	Norway	3	3	6
12	Antoine Merle	France	3	3	6
12	Bela Torma	Yugoslavia	3	3	6

=== Round 3 ===
Taha withdrew after his bout.

Bouts

Winner	Nation	Victory Type	Loser	Nation
Yakiv Punkin	Soviet Union	Decision, 3–0	Safi Taha	Lebanon
Imre Polyák	Hungary	Decision, 3–0	Ernest Gondzik	Poland
Bartl Brötzner	Austria	Decision, 3–0	Gunnar Håkansson	Sweden
Umberto Trippa	Italy	Fall	Rolf Ellerbrock	Germany
Abdel Aaal Rashed	Egypt	Decision, 3–0	Erkki Talosela	Finland
Hasan Bozbey	Turkey	Bye	N/A	N/A

Points

Rank	Wrestler	Nation	Start	Earned	Total
1	Yakiv Punkin	Soviet Union	0	1	1
2	Imre Polyák	Hungary	1	1	2
2	Abdel Aaal Rashed	Egypt	1	1	2
4	Bartl Brötzner	Austria	2	1	3
5	Hasan Bozbey	Turkey	4	0	4
5	Umberto Trippa	Italy	4	0	4
7	Safi Taha	Lebanon	0	3	3*
8	Ernest Gondzik	Poland	2	3	5
8	Erkki Talosela	Finland	2	3	5
10	Rolf Ellerbrock	Germany	4	3	7
10	Gunnar Håkansson	Sweden	4	3	7

=== Round 4 ===
The tie for third place (and the final spot in the medal rounds) was broken by Rashed's head-to-head victory over Trippa in round 1.

Bouts

Winner	Nation	Victory Type	Loser	Nation
Yakiv Punkin	Soviet Union	Decision, 3–0	Hasan Bozbey	Turkey
Imre Polyák	Hungary	Decision, 2–1	Abdel Aaal Rashed	Egypt
Umberto Trippa	Italy	Decision, 3–0	Bartl Brötzner	Austria

Points

Rank	Wrestler	Nation	Start	Earned	Total
1	Yakiv Punkin	Soviet Union	1	1	2
2	Imre Polyák	Hungary	2	1	3
3	Abdel Aaal Rashed	Egypt	2	3	5
4	Umberto Trippa	Italy	4	1	5
5	Bartl Brötzner	Austria	3	3	6
6	Hasan Bozbey	Turkey	4	3	7

=== Medal rounds ===
Polyák's victory over Rashed in round 4 counted for the medal round.

Bouts

Winner	Nation	Victory Type	Loser	Nation
Yakiv Punkin	Soviet Union	Fall	Imre Polyák	Hungary
Yakiv Punkin	Soviet Union	Fall	Abdel Aaal Rashed	Egypt

Points

Rank	Wrestler	Nation	Wins	Losses	Start	Earned	Total
1st place, gold medalist(s)	Yakiv Punkin	Soviet Union	2	0	2	0	2
2nd place, silver medalist(s)	Imre Polyák	Hungary	1	1	3	3	6
3rd place, bronze medalist(s)	Abdel Aaal Rashed	Egypt	0	2	5	3	8
