= Wrestling at the 1952 Summer Olympics =

Wrestling at the Games of the XV Olympiad
- Venue: Messuhalli
- Dates: 20 – 27 July
- Competitors: 244 from 37 nations

At the 1952 Summer Olympics, 16 wrestling events were contested, all for men. There were eight weight classes in Greco-Roman wrestling and eight classes in freestyle wrestling. The events were held at Messuhalli.

== Medal summary ==
=== Greco-Roman ===
Event	Gold	Silver	Bronze
Flyweight	Boris Gurevich; Soviet Union	Ignazio Fabra; Italy	Leo Honkala; Finland
Bantamweight	Imre Hódos; Hungary	Zakaria Chibab; Lebanon	Artem Teryan; Soviet Union
Featherweight	Yakov Punkin; Soviet Union	Imre Polyák; Hungary	Abdel Aaal Rashed; Egypt
Lightweight	Shazam Safin; Soviet Union	Gustav Freij; Sweden	Mikuláš Athanasov; Czechoslovakia
Welterweight	Miklós Szilvásy; Hungary	Gösta Andersson; Sweden	Khalil Taha; Lebanon
Middleweight	Axel Grönberg; Sweden	Kalervo Rauhala; Finland	Nikolay Belov; Soviet Union
Light heavyweight	Kelpo Gröndahl; Finland	Shalva Chikhladze; Soviet Union	Karl-Erik Nilsson; Sweden
Heavyweight	Johannes Kotkas; Soviet Union	Josef Růžička; Czechoslovakia	Tauno Kovanen; Finland

=== Freestyle ===
Event	Gold	Silver	Bronze
Flyweight	Hasan Gemici; Turkey	Yushu Kitano; Japan	Mahmoud Mollaghasemi; Iran
Bantamweight	Shohachi Ishii; Japan	Rashid Mammadbeyov; Soviet Union	Khashaba Dadasaheb Jadhav; India
Featherweight	Bayram Sit; Turkey	Nasser Givehchi; Iran	Josiah Henson; United States
Lightweight	Olle Anderberg; Sweden	Jay Thomas Evans; United States	Tofigh Jahanbakht; Iran
Welterweight	William Smith; United States	Per Berlin; Sweden	Abdollah Mojtabavi; Iran
Middleweight	David Tsimakuridze; Soviet Union	Gholamreza Takhti; Iran	György Gurics; Hungary
Light heavyweight	Viking Palm; Sweden	Henry Wittenberg; United States	Adil Atan; Turkey
Heavyweight	Arsen Mekokishvili; Soviet Union	Bertil Antonsson; Sweden	Kenneth Richmond; Great Britain

== Participating nations ==
A total of 244 wrestlers from 37 nations competed at the Helsinki Games:

- Argentina (5)
- Australia (4)
- Austria (3)
- Belgium (8)
- Canada (4)
- Czechoslovakia (3)
- Denmark (5)
- Egypt (12)
- Finland (16)
- France (10)
- Germany (8)
- Great Britain (6)
- Greece (3)
- Guatemala (3)
- Hungary (12)
- India (4)
- Iran (8)
- Ireland (1)
- Italy (14)
- Japan (5)
- South Korea (1)
- Lebanon (4)
- Luxembourg (3)
- Mexico (5)
- Norway (7)
- Philippines (1)
- Poland (5)
- Romania (7)
- South Africa (5)
- Soviet Union (16)
- Sweden (1)
- Switzerland (5)
- Turkey (15)
- United States (8)
- Venezuela (3)
- Yugoslavia (3)

== Medal table ==
Rank	Nation	Gold	Silver	Bronze	Total
1	Soviet Union	6	2	2	10
2	Sweden	3	4	1	8
3	Hungary	2	1	1	4
4	Turkey	2	0	1	3
5	United States	1	2	1	4
6	Finland	1	1	2	4
7	Japan	1	1	0	2
8	Iran	0	2	3	5
9	Czechoslovakia	0	1	1	2
9	Lebanon	0	1	1	2
11	Italy	0	1	0	1
12	Egypt	0	0	1	1
12	Great Britain	0	0	1	1
12	India	0	0	1	1
Totals (14 entries)		16	16	16	48

== See also ==
- List of World and Olympic Champions in men's freestyle wrestling
- List of World and Olympic Champions in Greco-Roman wrestling
