= Wrestling at the 1956 Summer Olympics – Men's Greco-Roman featherweight =

Wrestling at the Olympics

Men's Greco-Roman featherweight at the Games of the XVI Olympiad
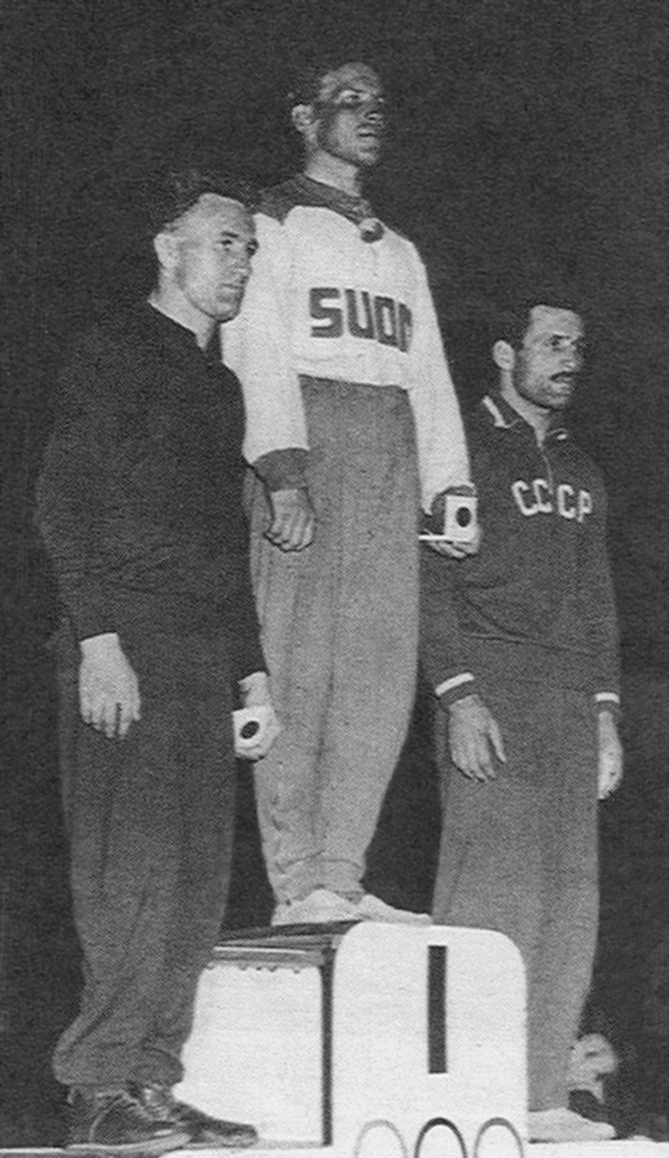
- Venue: Royal Exhibition Building
- Dates: 3–6 December 1956
- Competitors: 10 from 10 nations

Medalists
1st place, gold medalist(s)		Rauno Mäkinen	Finland
2nd place, silver medalist(s)		Imre Polyák	Hungary
3rd place, bronze medalist(s)		Roman Dzeneladze	Soviet Union

The men's Greco-Roman featherweight competition at the 1956 Summer Olympics in Melbourne took place from 3 December to 6 December at the Royal Exhibition Building. Nations were limited to one competitor. Featherweight was the third-lightest category, including wrestlers weighing 57 to 62 kilograms (125.7 to 136.7 lb).

== Competition format ==
This Greco-Roman wrestling competition continued to use the "bad points" elimination system introduced at the 1928 Summer Olympics for Greco-Roman and at the 1932 Summer Olympics for freestyle wrestling, as modified in 1952 (adding medal rounds and making all losses worth 3 points—from 1936 to 1948 losses by split decision only cost 2). Each round featured all wrestlers pairing off and wrestling one bout (with one wrestler having a bye if there were an odd number). The loser received 3 points. The winner received 1 point if the win was by decision and 0 points if the win was by fall. At the end of each round, any wrestler with at least 5 points was eliminated. This elimination continued until the medal rounds, which began when 3 wrestlers remained. These 3 wrestlers each faced each other in a round-robin medal round (with earlier results counting, if any had wrestled another before); record within the medal round determined medals, with bad points breaking ties.

== Results ==
=== Round 1 ===
Bouts

Winner	Nation	Victory Type	Loser	Nation
Ion Popescu	Romania	Decision, 3–0	Alan Rice	United States
Imre Polyák	Hungary	Decision, 2–1	Umberto Trippa	Italy
Gunnar Håkansson	Sweden	Decision, 3–0	Roger Bielle	France
Müzahir Sille	Turkey	Fall	Roman Dzeneladze	Soviet Union
Rauno Mäkinen	Finland	Fall	Norman Ickeringill	Australia

Points

Rank	Wrestler	Nation	Start	Earned	Total
1	Rauno Mäkinen	Finland	0	0	0
1	Müzahir Sille	Turkey	0	0	0
3	Gunnar Håkansson	Sweden	0	1	1
3	Imre Polyák	Hungary	0	1	1
3	Ion Popescu	Romania	0	1	1
6	Roger Bielle	France	0	3	3
6	Roman Dzeneladze	Soviet Union	0	3	3
6	Norman Ickeringill	Australia	0	3	3
6	Alan Rice	United States	0	3	3
6	Umberto Trippa	Italy	0	3	3

=== Round 2 ===
Bouts

Winner	Nation	Victory Type	Loser	Nation
Umberto Trippa	Italy	Decision, 3–0	Ion Popescu	Romania
Imre Polyák	Hungary	Decision, 3–0	Alan Rice	United States
Roman Dzeneladze	Soviet Union	Fall	Gunnar Håkansson	Sweden
Rauno Mäkinen	Finland	Decision, 2–1	Roger Bielle	France
Müzahir Sille	Turkey	Fall	Norman Ickeringill	Australia

Points

Rank	Wrestler	Nation	Start	Earned	Total
1	Müzahir Sille	Turkey	0	0	0
2	Rauno Mäkinen	Finland	0	1	1
3	Imre Polyák	Hungary	1	1	2
4	Roman Dzeneladze	Soviet Union	3	0	3
5	Gunnar Håkansson	Sweden	1	3	4
5	Ion Popescu	Romania	1	3	4
5	Umberto Trippa	Italy	3	1	4
8	Roger Bielle	France	3	3	6
8	Norman Ickeringill	Australia	3	3	6
8	Alan Rice	United States	3	3	6

=== Round 3 ===
Trippa had defeated Popescu head-to-head, earning the tie-breaker for 6th place.

Bouts

Winner	Nation	Victory Type	Loser	Nation
Imre Polyák	Hungary	Decision, 3–0	Ion Popescu	Romania
Roman Dzeneladze	Soviet Union	Fall	Umberto Trippa	Italy
Gunnar Håkansson	Sweden	Decision, 2–1	Müzahir Sille	Turkey
Rauno Mäkinen	Finland	Bye	N/A	N/A

Points

Rank	Wrestler	Nation	Start	Earned	Total
1	Rauno Mäkinen	Finland	1	0	1
2	Roman Dzeneladze	Soviet Union	3	0	3
2	Imre Polyák	Hungary	2	1	3
2	Müzahir Sille	Turkey	0	3	3
5	Gunnar Håkansson	Sweden	4	1	5
6	Umberto Trippa	Italy	4	3	7
7	Ion Popescu	Romania	4	3	7

=== Round 4 ===
Bouts

Winner	Nation	Victory Type	Loser	Nation
Roman Dzeneladze	Soviet Union	Decision, 2–1	Rauno Mäkinen	Finland
Imre Polyák	Hungary	Fall	Müzahir Sille	Turkey

Points

Rank	Wrestler	Nation	Start	Earned	Total
1	Imre Polyák	Hungary	3	0	3
2	Roman Dzeneladze	Soviet Union	3	1	4
2	Rauno Mäkinen	Finland	1	3	4
4	Müzahir Sille	Turkey	3	3	6

=== Medal rounds ===
Dzeneladze's victory over Mäkinen in round 4 counted for the medal rounds. Each wrestler finished 1–1 against the other medalists, with all of the victories by split decision. Mäkinen and Polyák tied for fewest points overall, at 5, with Mäkinen the victor among the two by head-to-head. Polyák took silver, having defeated Dzeneladze head-to-head.

Bouts

Winner	Nation	Victory Type	Loser	Nation
Rauno Mäkinen	Finland	Decision, 2–1	Imre Polyák	Hungary
Imre Polyák	Hungary	Decision, 2–1	Roman Dzeneladze	Soviet Union

Points

Rank	Wrestler	Nation	Wins	Losses	Points	Start	Earned	Total
1st place, gold medalist(s)	Rauno Mäkinen	Finland	1	1	4	4	1	5
2nd place, silver medalist(s)	Imre Polyák	Hungary	1	1	4	3	2	5
3rd place, bronze medalist(s)	Roman Dzeneladze	Soviet Union	1	1	4	4	3	7
