= Ronald Hall (disambiguation) =

Ronald Hall (1895–1975) was an English Anglican missionary bishop in Hong Kong and China.

Ronald Hall may also refer to:

- Ronald Acott Hall (1892–1966), British diplomat, writer and politician
- Ronald L. Hall (born 1945), American philosopher

== See also ==
- Ron Hall (disambiguation)
