= Ron Hall =

Ron Hall may refer to:

- Ron Hall (tight end) (1964–2007), former professional American football player
- Ron Hall (defensive back) (born 1937), American collegiate and professional American football player
- Ron Hall (Australian footballer, born 1921) (1921–1994), former Australian rules footballer in the VFL
- Ron Hall (Australian footballer, born 1945) (1945–2014), former Australian rules footballer from Tasmania
- Ron Hall (TV personality) (born 1997), English television personality

== See also ==
- Ronald Hall (disambiguation)
