= Wrestling at the 1952 Summer Olympics – Men's Greco-Roman bantamweight =

Wrestling at the Olympics

Men's Greco-Roman bantamweight at the Games of the XV Olympiad
- Venue: Messuhalli
- Dates: 24–27 July 1952
- Competitors: 17 from 17 nations

Medalists
1st place, gold medalist(s)		Imre Hódos	Hungary
2nd place, silver medalist(s)		Zakaria Chihab	Lebanon
3rd place, bronze medalist(s)		Artem Teryan	Soviet Union

The men's Greco-Roman bantamweight competition at the 1952 Summer Olympics in Helsinki took place from 24 July to 27 July at Messuhalli. Nations were limited to one competitor. Bantamweight is the second-lightest category, including wrestlers weighing 52 to 57 kilograms (114.6 to 125.7 lb).

== Competition format ==
This Greco-Roman wrestling competition continued to use the "bad points" elimination system introduced at the 1928 Summer Olympics for Greco-Roman and at the 1932 Summer Olympics for freestyle wrestling, removing the slight modification introduced in 1936 and used until 1948 (which had a reduced penalty for a loss by 2–1 decision). Each round featured all wrestlers pairing off and wrestling one bout (with one wrestler having a bye if there were an odd number). The loser received 3 points. The winner received 1 point if the win was by decision and 0 points if the win was by fall. At the end of each round, any wrestler with at least 5 points was eliminated. This elimination continued until the medal rounds, which began when 3 wrestlers remained. These 3 wrestlers each faced each other in a round-robin medal round (with earlier results counting, if any had wrestled another before); record within the medal round determined medals, with bad points breaking ties.

== Results ==
=== Round 1 ===
Hassan and Panagiotopoulos withdrew after their matches.

Bouts

Winner	Nation	Victory Type	Loser	Nation
Norbert Kohler	Saar	Fall	Oswaldo Johnston	Guatemala
Pietro Lombardi	Italy	Decision, 2–1	Hubert Persson	Sweden
Artem Teryan	Soviet Union	Fall	Rudolf Toboła	Poland
Kemal Demirsüren	Turkey	Fall	Leo Cortsen	Denmark
Zakaria Chihab	Lebanon	Decision, 3–0	Ion Popescu	Romania
Arvo Kyllönen	Finland	Fall	Maurice Faure	France
Imre Hódos	Hungary	Decision, 3–0	Mahmoud Hassan	Egypt
Reidar Merli	Norway	Decision, 3–0	Sotirios Panagiotopoulos	Greece
Ferdinand Schmitz	Germany	Bye	N/A	N/A

Points

Rank	Wrestler	Nation	Start	Earned	Total
1	Kemal Demirsüren	Turkey	0	0	0
1	Norbert Kohler	Saar	0	0	0
1	Arvo Kyllönen	Finland	0	0	0
1	Ferdinand Schmitz	Germany	0	0	0
1	Artem Teryan	Soviet Union	0	0	0
6	Zakaria Chihab	Lebanon	0	1	1
6	Imre Hódos	Hungary	0	1	1
6	Pietro Lombardi	Italy	0	1	1
6	Reidar Merli	Norway	0	1	1
10	Leo Cortsen	Denmark	0	3	3
10	Maurice Faure	France	0	3	3
10	Oswaldo Johnston	Guatemala	0	3	3
10	Hubert Persson	Sweden	0	3	3
10	Ion Popescu	Romania	0	3	3
10	Rudolf Toboła	Poland	0	3	3
16	Mahmoud Hassan	Czechoslovakia	0	3	3*
16	Sotirios Panagiotopoulos	Greece	0	3	3*

=== Round 2 ===
Bouts

Winner	Nation	Victory Type	Loser	Nation
Ferdinand Schmitz	Germany	Fall	Norbert Kohler	Saar
Hubert Persson	Sweden	Fall	Oswaldo Johnston	Guatemala
Pietro Lombardi	Italy	Decision, 3–0	Rudolf Toboła	Poland
Artem Teryan	Soviet Union	Decision, 3–0	Kemal Demirsüren	Turkey
Ion Popescu	Romania	Decision, 2–1	Leo Cortsen	Denmark
Zakaria Chihab	Lebanon	Decision, 2–1	Maurice Faure	France
Imre Hódos	Hungary	Decision, 2–1	Arvo Kyllönen	Finland
Reidar Merli	Norway	Bye	N/A	N/A

Points

Rank	Wrestler	Nation	Start	Earned	Total
1	Ferdinand Schmitz	Germany	0	0	0
2	Reidar Merli	Norway	1	0	1
2	Artem Teryan	Soviet Union	0	1	1
4	Zakaria Chihab	Lebanon	1	1	2
4	Imre Hódos	Hungary	1	1	2
4	Pietro Lombardi	Italy	1	1	2
7	Kemal Demirsüren	Turkey	0	3	3
7	Norbert Kohler	Saar	0	3	3
7	Arvo Kyllönen	Finland	0	3	3
7	Hubert Persson	Sweden	3	0	3
11	Ion Popescu	Romania	3	1	4
12	Leo Cortsen	Denmark	3	3	6
12	Maurice Faure	France	3	3	6
12	Oswaldo Johnston	Guatemala	3	3	6
12	Rudolf Toboła	Poland	3	3	6

=== Round 3 ===
Bouts

Winner	Nation	Victory Type	Loser	Nation
Reidar Merli	Norway	Decision, 3–0	Ferdinand Schmitz	Germany
Hubert Persson	Sweden	Decision, 3–0	Norbert Kohler	Saar
Artem Teryan	Soviet Union	Decision, 3–0	Pietro Lombardi	Italy
Ion Popescu	Romania	Fall	Kemal Demirsüren	Turkey
Zakaria Chihab	Lebanon	Decision, 3–0	Arvo Kyllönen	Finland
Imre Hódos	Hungary	Bye	N/A	N/A

Points

Rank	Wrestler	Nation	Start	Earned	Total
1	Imre Hódos	Hungary	2	0	2
1	Reidar Merli	Norway	1	1	2
1	Artem Teryan	Soviet Union	1	1	2
4	Zakaria Chihab	Lebanon	2	1	3
4	Ferdinand Schmitz	Germany	0	3	3
6	Hubert Persson	Sweden	3	1	4
6	Ion Popescu	Romania	4	0	4
8	Pietro Lombardi	Italy	2	3	5
9	Kemal Demirsüren	Turkey	3	3	6
9	Norbert Kohler	Saar	3	3	6
9	Arvo Kyllönen	Finland	3	3	6

=== Round 4 ===
Bouts

Winner	Nation	Victory Type	Loser	Nation
Imre Hódos	Hungary	Decision, 3–0	Reidar Merli	Norway
Hubert Persson	Sweden	Fall	Ferdinand Schmitz	Germany
Artem Teryan	Soviet Union	Decision, 3–0	Ion Popescu	Romania
Zakaria Chihab	Lebanon	Bye	N/A	N/A

Points

Rank	Wrestler	Nation	Start	Earned	Total
1	Zakaria Chihab	Lebanon	3	0	3
1	Imre Hódos	Hungary	2	1	3
1	Artem Teryan	Soviet Union	2	1	3
4	Hubert Persson	Sweden	4	0	4
5	Reidar Merli	Norway	2	3	5
6	Ferdinand Schmitz	Germany	3	3	6
7	Ion Popescu	Romania	4	3	7

=== Round 5 ===
Bouts

Winner	Nation	Victory Type	Loser	Nation
Imre Hódos	Hungary	Decision, 2–1	Zakaria Chihab	Lebanon
Artem Teryan	Soviet Union	Decision, 3–0	Hubert Persson	Sweden

Points

Rank	Wrestler	Nation	Start	Earned	Total
1	Imre Hódos	Hungary	3	1	4
1	Artem Teryan	Soviet Union	3	1	4
3	Zakaria Chihab	Lebanon	3	3	6
4	Hubert Persson	Sweden	4	3	7

=== Medal rounds ===
Chihab and Hódos had met in round 5 and did not wrestle each other again. The tie between Chihab and Hódos in the standings was resolved by head-to-head (Hódos had won the bout between the two).

Bouts

Winner	Nation	Victory Type	Loser	Nation
Zakaria Chihab	Lebanon	Decision, 2–1	Artem Teryan	Soviet Union
Artem Teryan	Soviet Union	Decision, 3–0	Imre Hódos	Hungary

Points

Rank	Wrestler	Nation	Wins	Losses	Start	Earned	Total
1st place, gold medalist(s)	Imre Hódos	Hungary	1	1	4	3	7
2nd place, silver medalist(s)	Zakaria Chihab	Lebanon	1	1	6	1	7
3rd place, bronze medalist(s)	Artem Teryan	Soviet Union	1	1	4	4	8
