= Cortsen =

Cortsen is a Danish surname. Notable people with the surname include:

- Kenneth Cortsen (born 1976), Danish sport management researcher
- Leo Cortsen (born 1930), Danish wrestler
