= Kyllönen =

Kyllönen is a Finnish surname. Notable people with the surname include:

- Anne Kyllönen (born 1987), Finnish cross-country skier
- Arvo Kyllönen (1932–2017), Finnish wrestler
- Jens Kyllönen (born 1989), Finnish professional poker player
- Kai Kyllönen (born 1965), Finnish hurdler
- Markku Kyllönen (born 1962), Finnish ice hockey player
- Merja Kyllönen (born 1977), Finnish politician
- Sanna Kyllönen (born 1971), Finnish sprinter
