= Norman Ickeringill =

Australian wrestler

Personal information
- Nationality: Australian
- Born: 22 January 1923 Melbourne, Australia
- Died: 18 August 2007 (aged 84) Melbourne, Australia

Sport
- Sport: Wrestling

Norman Ickeringill (22 January 1923 – 18 August 2007) was an Australian wrestler. He competed in the men's Greco-Roman featherweight at the 1956 Summer Olympics.
