= Bela Torma =

Serbian wrestler

Personal information
- Full name: Vojislav Bela Torma
- Nationality: Serbian
- Born: 9 April 1930

Sport
- Sport: Wrestling

Bela Torma (born 9 April 1930) is a Serbian wrestler. He competed in the men's Greco-Roman bantamweight at the 1952 Summer Olympics.
