= Rudolf Toboła =

Polish wrestler (1927–1987)

Personal information
- Nationality: Polish
- Born: 21 May 1927 Maricourt, France
- Died: 1987 (aged 59–60) Germany

Sport
- Sport: Wrestling

Rudolf Toboła (21 May 1927 – 1987) was a Polish wrestler. He competed in the men's Greco-Roman bantamweight at the 1952 Summer Olympics.
