= Ferdinand Schmitz =

German wrestler (1919–1981)

Medal record

Representing Germany

Men's wrestling

European Championships
Silver medal – second place	1939 Oslo	Greco-Roman - 61kg
Bronze medal – third place	1938 Tallinn	Greco-Roman - 56kg

Ferdinand Schmitz (October 14, 1919 – November 6, 1981) was a German wrestler who competed at the 1952 Summer Olympics. In Helsinki he participated in both the freestyle and Greco-Roman bantamweight competitions, eventually withdrawing from the former and finishing sixth in the latter. He had two podium results at the European Championships, placing third in 56 kg Greco-Roman event in 1938 and second in the 61-kg Greco-Roman event in 1939. He was born in Cologne and was a member of ESV Olympia Köln. His brother Heini Nettesheim was also an Olympic wrestler who competed in the 1936 and 1952 Summer Olympics.
