= Hubert Persson =

Swedish wrestler

Personal information
- Nationality: Swedish
- Born: 22 February 1918 Ånge, Sweden
- Died: 27 December 1990 (aged 72) Eskilstuna, Sweden

Sport
- Sport: Wrestling

Hubert Persson (22 February 1918 – 27 December 1990) was a Swedish wrestler. He competed in the men's Greco-Roman bantamweight at the 1952 Summer Olympics.
