= Wrestling at the 1952 Summer Olympics – Men's Greco-Roman light heavyweight =

Wrestling at the Olympics

Men's Greco-Roman light heavyweight at the Games of the XV Olympiad
- Venue: Messuhalli
- Dates: 24–27 July 1952
- Competitors: 10 from 10 nations

Medalists
1st place, gold medalist(s)		Kelpo Gröndahl	Finland
2nd place, silver medalist(s)		Shalva Chikhladze	Soviet Union
3rd place, bronze medalist(s)		Karl-Erik Nilsson	Sweden

The men's Greco-Roman light heavyweight competition at the 1952 Summer Olympics in Helsinki took place from 24 July to 27 July at Messuhalli. Nations were limited to one competitor. 79 to 87 kilograms (174.2 to 191.8 lb).

== Competition format ==
This Greco-Roman wrestling competition continued to use the "bad points" elimination system introduced at the 1928 Summer Olympics for Greco-Roman and at the 1932 Summer Olympics for freestyle wrestling, removing the slight modification introduced in 1936 and used until 1948 (which had a reduced penalty for a loss by 2–1 decision). Each round featured all wrestlers pairing off and wrestling one bout (with one wrestler having a bye if there were an odd number). The loser received 3 points. The winner received 1 point if the win was by decision and 0 points if the win was by fall. At the end of each round, any wrestler with at least 5 points was eliminated. This elimination continued until the medal rounds, which began when 3 wrestlers remained. These 3 wrestlers each faced each other in a round-robin medal round (with earlier results counting, if any had wrestled another before); record within the medal round determined medals, with bad points breaking ties.

== Results ==
=== Round 1 ===
Bouts

Winner	Nation	Victory Type	Loser	Nation
Michel Skaff	Lebanon	Decision, 2–1	Ovidiu Forai	Romania
Karl-Erik Nilsson	Sweden	Decision, 3–0	Gyula Kovács	Hungary
Umberto Silvestri	Italy	Decision, 2–1	İsmet Atlı	Turkey
Kelpo Gröndahl	Finland	Fall	Jos Schummer	Luxembourg
Shalva Chikhladze	Soviet Union	Fall	Max Leichter	Germany

Points

Rank	Wrestler	Nation	Start	Earned	Total
1	Shalva Chikhladze	Soviet Union	0	0	0
1	Kelpo Gröndahl	Finland	0	0	0
3	Karl-Erik Nilsson	Sweden	0	1	1
3	Umberto Silvestri	Italy	0	1	1
3	Michel Skaff	Lebanon	0	1	1
6	İsmet Atlı	Turkey	0	3	3
6	Ovidiu Forai	Romania	0	3	3
6	Gyula Kovács	Hungary	0	3	3
6	Max Leichter	Germany	0	3	3
6	Jos Schummer	Luxembourg	0	3	3

=== Round 2 ===
Bouts

Winner	Nation	Victory Type	Loser	Nation
Gyula Kovács	Hungary	Fall	Michel Skaff	Lebanon
Karl-Erik Nilsson	Sweden	Decision, 3–0	Ovidiu Forai	Romania
İsmet Atlı	Turkey	Fall	Jos Schummer	Luxembourg
Shalva Chikhladze	Soviet Union	Decision, 3–0	Umberto Silvestri	Italy
Kelpo Gröndahl	Finland	Decision, 3–0	Max Leichter	Germany

Points

Rank	Wrestler	Nation	Start	Earned	Total
1	Shalva Chikhladze	Soviet Union	0	1	1
1	Kelpo Gröndahl	Finland	0	1	1
3	Karl-Erik Nilsson	Sweden	1	1	2
4	İsmet Atlı	Turkey	3	0	3
4	Gyula Kovács	Hungary	3	0	3
6	Umberto Silvestri	Italy	1	3	4
6	Michel Skaff	Lebanon	1	3	4
8	Ovidiu Forai	Romania	3	3	6
8	Max Leichter	Germany	3	3	6
8	Jos Schummer	Luxembourg	3	3	6

=== Round 3 ===
Bouts

Winner	Nation	Victory Type	Loser	Nation
Karl-Erik Nilsson	Sweden	Fall	Michel Skaff	Lebanon
Gyula Kovács	Hungary	Decision, 3–0	İsmet Atlı	Turkey
Kelpo Gröndahl	Finland	Fall	Umberto Silvestri	Italy
Shalva Chikhladze	Soviet Union	Bye	N/A	N/A

Points

Rank	Wrestler	Nation	Start	Earned	Total
1	Shalva Chikhladze	Soviet Union	1	0	1
1	Kelpo Gröndahl	Finland	1	0	1
3	Karl-Erik Nilsson	Sweden	2	0	2
4	Gyula Kovács	Hungary	3	1	4
5	İsmet Atlı	Turkey	3	3	6
6	Umberto Silvestri	Italy	4	3	7
6	Michel Skaff	Lebanon	4	3	7

=== Round 4 ===
Nilsson's victory over Kovács in round 1 was the tie-breaker for third place and entry into the medal rounds.

Bouts

Winner	Nation	Victory Type	Loser	Nation
Gyula Kovács	Hungary	Decision, 3–0	Shalva Chikhladze	Soviet Union
Kelpo Gröndahl	Finland	Decision, 2–1	Karl-Erik Nilsson	Sweden

Points

Rank	Wrestler	Nation	Start	Earned	Total
1	Kelpo Gröndahl	Finland	1	1	2
2	Shalva Chikhladze	Soviet Union	1	3	4
3	Karl-Erik Nilsson	Sweden	2	3	5
4	Gyula Kovács	Hungary	4	1	5

=== Medal rounds ===
Gröndahl's victory over Nilsson in round 4 was counted for the medal rounds.

Bouts

Winner	Nation	Victory Type	Loser	Nation
Shalva Chikhladze	Soviet Union	Decision, 3–0	Karl-Erik Nilsson	Sweden
Kelpo Gröndahl	Finland	Decision, 2–1	Shalva Chikhladze	Soviet Union

Points

Rank	Wrestler	Nation	Wins	Losses	Start	Earned	Total
1st place, gold medalist(s)	Kelpo Gröndahl	Finland	2	0	2	1	3
2nd place, silver medalist(s)	Shalva Chikhladze	Soviet Union	1	1	4	4	8
3rd place, bronze medalist(s)	Karl-Erik Nilsson	Sweden	0	2	5	3	8
