= Rauno Mäkinen =

Finnish wrestler (1931–2010)

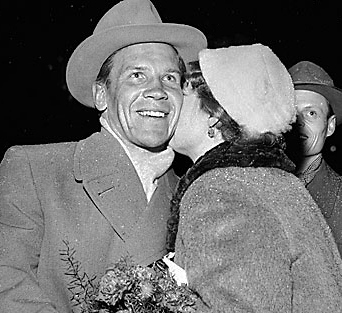
- Mäkinen with wife in 1956

Personal information
- Born: 22 January 1931 Pori, Finland
- Died: 9 September 2010 (aged 79) Vaajakoski, Finland
- Height: 168 cm (5 ft 6 in)
- Weight: 62–68 kg (137–150 lb)

Sport
- Sport: Greco-Roman wrestling
Medal record
Men's Greco-Roman wrestling
Representing Finland
Olympic Games
Gold medal – first place	1956 Melbourne	62 kg

Rauno Leonard Mäkinen (22 January 1931 – 9 September 2010) was a Finnish featherweight wrestler. He started as a freestyle wrestler, winning four consecutive national titles in 1952–55 and finishing sixth at the 1952 Summer Olympics. He then changed to Greco-Roman wrestling and won a national title and an Olympic gold medal in 1956. His further career was hampered by injuries. In 1960 he won one more national title, but withdrew from the 1960 Olympics after two bouts and retired from competitions.

Mäkinen followed his father Väinö, who competed internationally in freestyle wrestling and founded the Tampereen Paini-Miehet wrestling club. Besides wrestling Mäkinen played association football at the national level for Ilves-Kissat. Originally a construction engineer, after retiring from competitions he became a policeman and worked in Tampere, Jyväskylä and Vaajakoski until retiring in 1974 due to an illness. He remained involved in wrestling as a referee, and in this function attended the 1962 and 1965 World Championships and 1968 Olympic Games. While living in Tampere, he also coached young wrestlers and football players and headed the Tampereen Paini-Miehet club.

In 1950 Mäkinen married Raili Kymäläisen. They had five children: Arja (b. 1951), Pirjo (b. 1952), Reijo (b. 1954), Marjo (b. 1960) and Merja (b. 1961).
