= Oswaldo Johnston =

Guatemalan wrestler (1930–2021)

Personal information
- Nationality: Guatemalan
- Born: 27 March 1930
- Died: 16 August 2021 (aged 91)

Sport
- Sport: Wrestling

Oswaldo Johnston (27 March 1930 – 16 August 2021) was a Guatemalan wrestler. He competed in two events at the 1952 Summer Olympics.
