= Roman Dzneladze =

Georgian wrestler (1933–1966)

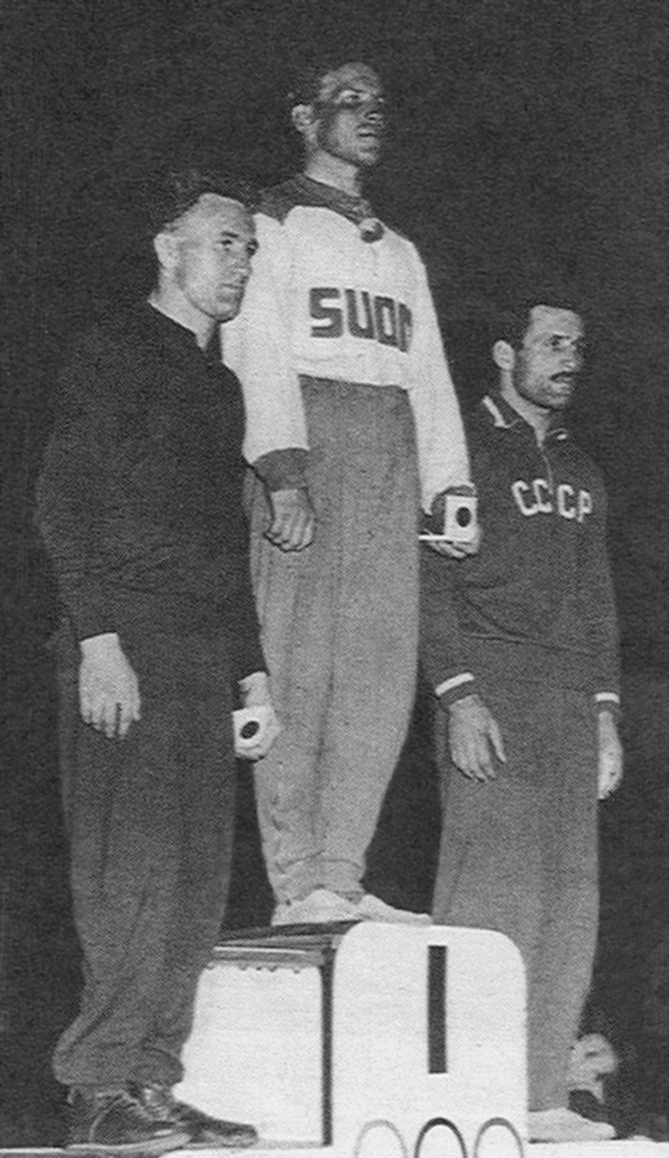
- Dzeneladze (right) at the 1956 Olympics

Personal information
- Born: 1 September 1933 Tbilisi, Georgian SSR, Soviet Union
- Died: 11 April 1966 (aged 32) Terjola, Imereti, Georgian SSR, Soviet Union
- Height: 1.78 m (5 ft 10 in)
- Weight: 62 kg (137 lb)

Sport
- Sport: Greco-Roman wrestling
- Club: Dynamo Tbilisi
Medal record
Representing the Soviet Union
Olympic Games
| Bronze medal – third place | 1956 Melbourne | Featherweight |

Roman Mikhaylovich Dzeneladze (Russian: Роман Михайлович Дзенеладзе, 12 April 1933 – 11 April 1966) was a featherweight Greco-Roman wrestler from Soviet Georgia. In 1956 he won a Soviet title and a bronze medal at the 1956 Summer Olympics. He died in a car crash together with fellow Olympic wrestler Avtandil Koridze. He was married to Neli Dzneladze for nearly 9 years and they had two children together.
