= Kemal Demirsüren =

Turkish wrestler

Personal information
- Nationality: Turkish
- Born: 1930
- Died: 27 March 2005 (aged 74–75)

Sport
- Sport: Wrestling

Kemal Demirsüren (1930 – 27 March 2005) was a Turkish wrestler. He competed in the men's Greco-Roman bantamweight at the 1952 Summer Olympics.
