= Alan Rice (wrestler) =

American wrestler and coach

Personal information
- Born: June 2, 1928 (age 98) Saint Paul, Minnesota, U.S.

Sport
- Country: United States
- Sport: Wrestling
- Events: Greco-Roman, Freestyle, and Folkstyle
- College team: Minnesota
- Team: USA
Medal record
Men's freestyle wrestling
Representing the United States
Pan American Games
Silver medal – second place	1955 Mexico City	63 kg

Alan Rice (born June 2, 1928) is an American former wrestler and coach. He competed in the men's Greco-Roman featherweight at the 1956 Summer Olympics. He was also a silver medalist at the 1955 Pan American Games in freestyle wrestling, competing in the 63 kg weight class. He was an AAU national champion in both freestyle and Greco-Roman. Rice wrestled collegiately at the University of Minnesota, where he was an NCAA All-American in 1949.

Rice would serve as a primary force in the growth of Greco-Roman wrestling in the United States. By 1966, Rice had formed the Minnesota Amateur Wrestling Club. In 10 different Olympics, Minnesotans would make Greco-Roman teams 30 times, winning four medals and drawing top athletes to the Twin Cities for training. Due to the club's success, Rice was tapped as head coach of the 1972 U.S. Greco-Roman Olympic team for the Games in Munich. His continued efforts helped in shaping the 2000 U.S. Greco-Roman Olympic team on its way to claiming a gold, a silver and a bronze medal.

He was inducted into the National Wrestling Hall of Fame as a Distinguished Member in 2001.
