= International Journal for Philosophy of Religion =

- Discipline: Philosophy
- Language: English
- Edited by: Ronald L. Hall

Publication details
- History: 1970–present
- Publisher: Society for Philosophy of Religion
- Frequency: Triannual
- ISO 4: Find out here

Indexing
- ISSN: 0020-7047

Links
- Journal homepage

The International Journal for Philosophy of Religion is a triannual peer-reviewed academic journal covering different aspects of philosophy of religion sponsored by the Society for Philosophy of Religion and published by Springer. It was established in 1970 by Edgar Henderson, Robert Leet Patterson, and Henry C. Sprinkle.

== See also ==
- List of philosophy journals
