= Hasan Bozbey =

Turkish wrestler (born 1928)

Personal information
- Nationality: Turkish
- Born: 1928

Sport
- Sport: Wrestling

Hasan Bozbey (born 1928) was a Turkish wrestler. He competed in the men's Greco-Roman bantamweight at the 1952 Summer Olympics.
