= Dagfin Huseby =

Norwegian wrestler

Personal information
- Nationality: Norwegian
- Born: 5 October 1922 Tistedalen, Norway
- Died: 24 February 2010 (aged 87) Halden, Norway

Sport
- Sport: Wrestling

Dagfin Huseby (5 October 1922 – 24 February 2010) was a Norwegian wrestler. He competed in the men's Greco-Roman bantamweight at the 1952 Summer Olympics.
