= Norbert Kohler =

German wrestler

Personal information
- Nationality: German
- Born: 31 March 1930 Maßweiler, Germany
- Died: 13 March 2003 (aged 72) Saarbrücken, Germany

Sport
- Sport: Wrestling

Norbert Theo Kohler (31 March 1930 – 13 March 2003) was a German wrestler. He competed in the men's Greco-Roman bantamweight at the 1952 Summer Olympics, representing Saar.
