= Rolf Ellerbrock =

German wrestler

Personal information
- Nationality: German
- Born: 30 May 1933 (age 91); Dortmund, Germany

Sport
- Sport: Wrestling

Rolf Ellerbrock (born 30 May 1933) is a German wrestler. He competed in two events at the 1952 Summer Olympics.
