= Jos Schummer =

Luxembourgish wrestler

Personal information
- Nationality: Luxembourgish
- Born: 11 December 1930 Luxembourg City, Luxembourg
- Died: 17 July 1980 (aged 49) Luxembourg City, Luxembourg

Sport
- Sport: Wrestling

Jos Schummer (11 December 1930 – 17 July 1980) was a Luxembourgish wrestler. He competed in the men's Greco-Roman light heavyweight at the 1952 Summer Olympics.
