= Sotirios Panagiotopoulos =

Greek wrestler

Personal information
- Nationality: Greek
- Born: 5 January 1930

Sport
- Sport: Wrestling

Sotirios Panagiotopoulos (born 5 January 1930) is a Greek former wrestler. He competed in the men's Greco-Roman bantamweight at the 1952 Summer Olympics.
