= Abdullah Jaroudi Jr. =

Lebanese sports shooter (born 1938)

Personal information
- Born: 18 March 1938 (age 88) Beirut, Lebanon

Sport
- Sport: Sports shooting

Abdullah Jaroudi Jr. (born 18 March 1938) is a Lebanese former sports shooter. He competed in the 50 metre rifle, prone event at the 1960 Summer Olympics. His father, Abdullah Jaroudi Sr., competed at the 1952 Summer Olympics.
