= Abdel Sattar Tarabulsi =

Lebanese sports shooter

Personal information
- Born: 1908

Sport
- Sport: Sports shooting

Abdel Sattar Tarabulsi (born 1908, date of death unknown) was a Lebanese sports shooter. He competed in the 50 m pistol event at the 1952 Summer Olympics.
