= Michel Skaff =

Lebanese wrestler (1923–2001)

Personal information
- Nationality: Lebanese
- Born: 1923 Al-Qoubaiyat, Lebanon
- Died: 4 January 2001 (aged 77–78)

Sport
- Sport: Wrestling

Michel Skaff (1923 – 4 January 2001) was a Lebanese wrestler. He competed in the men's Greco-Roman light heavyweight at the 1952 Summer Olympics. Skaff died on 4 January 2001.
