= Imre Polyák =

Hungarian wrestler (1932–2010)

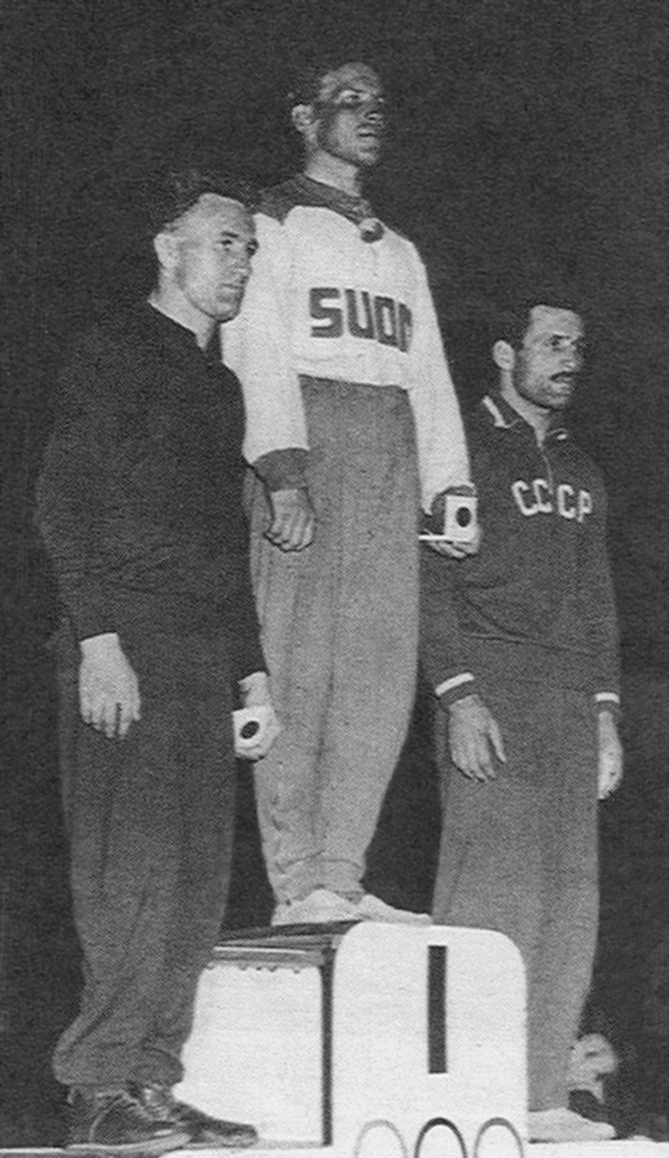
- Polyák (left) at the 1956 Olympics

Personal information
- Born: 16 April 1932 Kecskemét, Hungary
- Died: 15 November 2010 (aged 78) Budapest, Hungary
- Height: 170 cm (5 ft 7 in)

Sport
- Sport: Greco-Roman wrestling
- Club: Újpesti TE, Budapest
- Coached by: László Marton; Mihály Matura
Medal record
Men's Greco-Roman wrestling
Representing Hungary
Olympic Games
Gold medal – first place	1964 Tokyo	63 kg
Silver medal – second place	1952 Helsinki	62 kg
Silver medal – second place	1956 Melbourne	62 kg
Silver medal – second place	1960 Rome	62 kg
World Championships
Gold medal – first place	1955 Karlsruhe	62 kg
Gold medal – first place	1958 Budapest	62 kg
Gold medal – first place	1962 Toledo	63 kg
Silver medal – second place	1961 Yokohama	67 kg
Silver medal – second place	1963 Helsingborg	63 kg
World Cup
Bronze medal – third place	1956 Istanbul	62 kg

Imre Polyák (16 April 1932 – 15 November 2010) was a featherweight Greco-Roman wrestler from Hungary. He competed in the 1952, 1956, 1960 and 1964 Olympics and won three silver and one gold medal. He won the world title in 1955, 1958 and 1962, and placed second in 1961 and 1963. Nationally Polyák won 12 Hungarian titles and was named Sportsman of the Year in 1958 and 1962.

Polyák was a policeman by profession. After retiring from competitions he worked as a coach in his native club Újpesti. In 2003 he was one of the first athletes to be inducted into the FILA International wrestling Hall of Fame.

== See also ==
- List of multiple Summer Olympic medalists

Awards
Preceded by New Award	Hungarian Sportsman of The Year; 1958	Succeeded by Rudolf Kárpáti
Preceded by György Gurics	Hungarian Sportsman of The Year; 1962	Succeeded by Győző Veres
