= Artyom Teryan =

Olympic wrestler (1930–1970)

Personal information
- Born: 5 March 1930 Kirovabad, Azerbaijan SSR, Soviet Union
- Died: April 1970 (aged 40) Baku, Azerbaijan SSR, Soviet Union
- Weight: 57 kg (126 lb)

Sport
- Sport: Wrestling
- Event: Greco-Roman
- Club: Dynamo Baku
- Coached by: Andrew Danielian
Medal record
Representing the Soviet Union
Olympic Games
Bronze medal – third place	1952 Helsinki	57 kg
World Championships
Gold medal – first place	1953 Naples	57 kg

Artyom Sarkisovich Teryan (Russian: Артём Саркисович Терян, 5 March 1930 – April 1970) was a Soviet Armenian Greco-Roman wrestler. He was an Olympic medalist and world champion.

== Biography ==
Teryan was born in Azerbaijan to an Armenian family from the village Banants and lost his father in World War II. He took up wrestling in 1945, first the Armenian Kokh, and then classical wrestling. His first coach was Andrew Danielian.

After graduating from school Teryan moved to Baku to study at the Baku Institute of Physical Education. He won the Soviet championships in Greco-Roman wrestling from 1950 to 1954, and since 1952 competed internationally, winning a bronze medal at the 1952 Summer Olympics in Helsinki in the bantamweight category (57 kg). He was a member of the first Soviet wrestling team to compete in a World Championships at the 1953 World Wrestling Championships in Naples. Teryan won the gold medal in his division, defeating Olympic Champion Imre Hódos in the finals. In 1953 he became the first wrestler from Azerbaijan to win a world title. Domestically he also won the Soviet bantamweight title in freestyle wrestling. In 1955 he broke his clavicle after a motorcycle accident. He retired from competitions and became a wrestling coach at his sports society Dynamo Baku. In April 1970, he was killed in a domestic dispute.
