= Bartl Brötzner =

Austrian wrestler (1928–2015)

Personal information
- Nationality: Austrian
- Born: 13 February 1928; Salzburg, Austria
- Died: 12 September 2015 (aged 87)

Sport
- Sport: Wrestling
- Club: AC Wals

Bartl Brötzner (13 February 1928 – 12 September 2015) was an Austrian wrestler. He competed at the 1952 Summer Olympics, the 1956 Summer Olympics and the 1960 Summer Olympics. He is the father of wrestler Bartholomäus Brötzner.
