= Shalva Chikhladze =

Soviet wrestler (1912–1997)

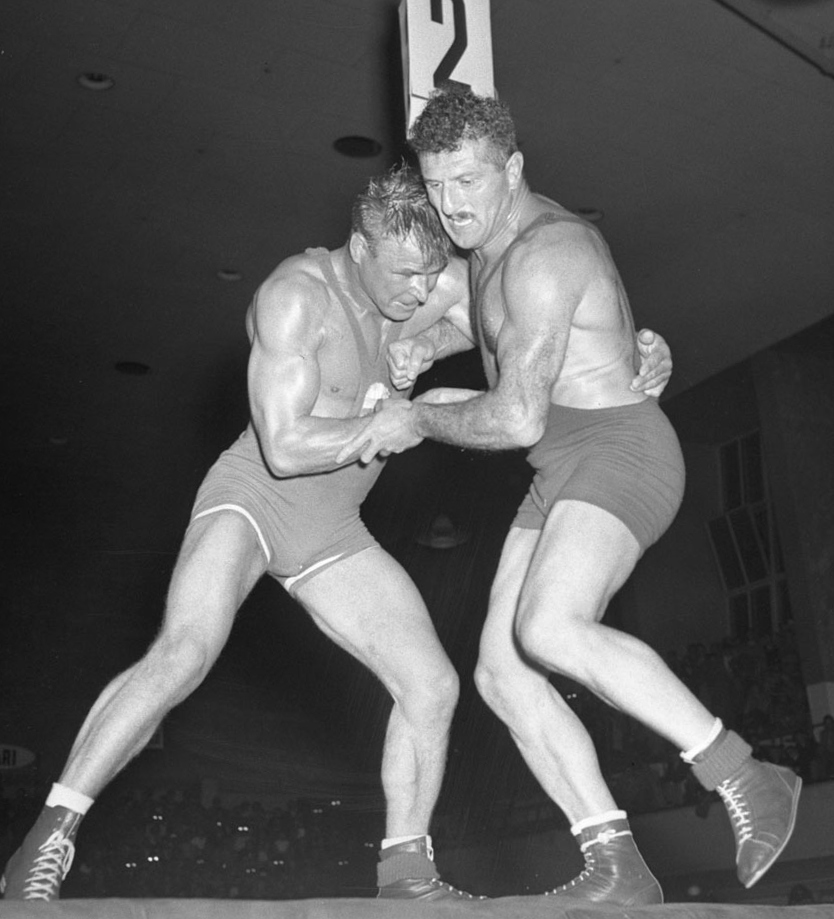
- Chikhladze (right) va. Kelpo Gröndahl in the 1952 Olympic final

Personal information
- Native name: შალვა ჩიხლაძე
- Born: Шалва Константинович Чихладзе შალვა ჩიხლაძე 12 July 1912 Kutaisi, Kutais Governorate, Russian Empire
- Died: 14 January 1997 (aged 84) Tbilisi, Georgia

Sport
- Sport: Greco-Roman wrestling
- Club: Dynamo Moscow
Medal record
Representing the Soviet Union
Olympic Games
Silver medal – second place	1952 Helsinki	87 kg

Shalva Konstantinovich Chikhladze (Georgian: შალვა ჩიხლაძე; 12 July 1912 – 14 January 1997) was a Soviet light-heavyweight wrestler from Georgia. He won a silver medal in the Greco-Roman light-heavyweight division at the 1952 Summer Olympics.

Chikhladze became interested in wrestling in 1920, and started training in a club in 1930, when he moved from Kutaisi to Tbilisi. In 1935 he moved to Moscow and placed second at the Soviet championships; he won the championships in 1936 and finished third in 1937 and 1941. During World War II he was wounded in action near Kaluga in late 1941. In March 1942 he was released from hospital and discharged with honors from the army. He then collected three more Soviet wrestling titles in 1946, 1949 and 1950, and was selected for the 1952 Olympics, despite being 40 years old. Chikhladze won a silver medal, losing the final to Kelpo Gröndahl 1:2, and retired from competitions. Later he coached wrestlers in his native Georgia.
