= Juan Curet =

Puerto Rican boxer

Personal information
- Nationality: Puerto Rican
- Born: 2 March 1928; Santurce, Puerto Rico
- Died: 9 January 2013 (aged 84)

Sport
- Sport: Boxing

Juan Curet (2 March 1928 – 9 January 2013) was a Puerto Rican boxer. He competed in the men's light welterweight event at the 1952 Summer Olympics. He served as Sergent in the United States Army.
