= Lucien Claes =

Belgian wrestler (1923–1994)

Lucien Johannes Claes
Personal information
- Nationality: Belgian
- Born: 13 June 1923 Zwijndrecht, Belgium
- Died: 13 November 1994 (aged 71)

Sport
- Sport: Wrestling

Lucien Claes (13 June 1923 – 13 November 1994) was a Belgian wrestler. He competed in the men's Greco-Roman bantamweight at the 1952 Summer Olympics.
