= Cecil Wylde =

British ice hockey player

Personal information
- Nationality: British
- Born: 28 January 1904 Brookline, Massachusetts, United States
- Died: 11 November 1994 (aged 90) Natick, Massachusetts, United States

Sport
- Sport: Ice hockey

Cecil Irton Wylde (28 January 1904 – 11 November 1994) was a British ice hockey player. He competed in the men's tournament at the 1928 Winter Olympics. He graduated from Harvard College and University of Cambridge.
