= George Harris (cricketer, born 1906) =

English cricketer

Cricket information
- Bowling: Left-arm fast

Career statistics
Competition	First-class
Matches	4
Runs scored	6
Batting average	1.20
100s/50s	0/0
Top score	4
Balls bowled	186
Wickets	2
Bowling average	60.00
5 wickets in innings	0
10 wickets in match	0
Best bowling	2/40
Catches/stumpings	1/–
- Source: Cricinfo, 8 November 2022

George Cecil Harris (3 March 1906 – 18 November 1994) was an English first-class cricketer who played in four matches for Worcestershire in 1925.

He did little, bowling only 31 overs in total and taking only two wickets. Both of these came in the first innings of a match against Derbyshire; his victims were Jim Hutchinson and James Horsley. With the bat he was hopeless, his career scores being 0, 0*, 4, 0*, 1*, 0, 1 and 0. He claimed only one catch, to dismiss Harry Howell of Warwickshire.

Harris was born in Droitwich, Worcestershire; he died at the age of 86 in Worcester.
