= Robert Fendler =

Austrian footballer (1921–1994)

Personal information
- Date of birth: 26 February 1921
- Place of birth: Wiener Neustadt, Austria
- Date of death: 26 November 1994 (aged 73)
- Position: Midfielder

International career
Years	Team	Apps	(Gls)
- Austria

Robert Fendler (26 February 1921 - 26 November 1994) was an Austrian footballer. He competed in the men's tournament at the 1952 Summer Olympics.
