= Theodore Robert Dudley =

American botanist (1936–1994)

- Born: December 31, 1936; Boston, Massachusetts
- Died: November 17, 1994 (57); Bar Harbor, Maine
- Scientific career
- Fields: Botany
- Institutions: United States National Arboretum
- Author abbrev. (botany): T.R.Dudley

Theodore ("Ted") Robert Dudley (1936–1994) was an American botanist, who died prematurely of a brain tumor.

== Education & Career ==
Ted attended the University of Edinburgh, where he obtained a Ph.D. with the thesis "Taxonomic studies in the Cruciferae of the Near East". He worked at the Arnold Arboretum at Harvard University from 1956 until joining the United States National Arboretum in 1966 where he was a taxonomist and Curator of the herbarium.

He was an authority on the holly genus (Ilex) as well as Viburnum and Alyssum.

== Collections ==
The majority of Ted's collections are housed at the United States National Arboretum Herbarium with other collections distributed around the world at institutions like the University of Reading Herbarium, the Harvard University Herbaria, and the Instituto de Botánica Darwinion de Buenos Aires.

He collected extensively in Argentina, and the Antarctic, and also Turkey, Greece, Peru, Korea, and China. He was a participant in the first Sino-American Botanical Expedition in 1980. Many of the collections from his expeditions were new to science and were sometimes named in his honor (for example, Masdevallia dudleyi Luer).

=== Honors ===
Marshall Scholarship

== Sources ==
- University of Reading Plant Sciences: Theodore, Robert Dudley
- Harvard Botanist Index: Theodore Robert Dudley
