= Ronald L. Hall =

American philosopher

- Born: 1945 (age 80–81)

Education
- Education: Stetson University (B.A.), Duke University (M. Div.), UNC-Chapel Hill (Ph.D.)

Philosophical work
- Era: 21st-century philosophy
- Region: Western philosophy
- Institutions: Stetson University (2000-), Francis Marion University (1973-2000)

Ronald L. Hall is an American philosopher and Professor Emeritus of Philosophy at Stetson University, known for his work on philosophy of religion. Previously he taught at Francis Marion University. He is the editor-in-chief of the International Journal for Philosophy of Religion and is past president of the Society for Philosophy of Religion.

== Books ==
- Word and Spirit: A Kierkegaardian Critique of the Modern Age (Bloomington, Indiana: Indiana University Press, 1993)
- The Human Embrace: The Love of Philosophy and the Philosophy of Love: Kierkegaard, Cavell, Nussbaum (University Park, Pennsylvania: The Pennsylvania State University Press, 1999)
- Logic: A Brief Introduction (Originally published by The Philosophy Documentary Center)
