= Reidar Merli =

Norwegian wrestler

Personal information
- Born: 1 April 1917 Aurskog-Høland, Norway
- Died: 29 December 2007 (aged 90)

Sport
- Sport: Wrestling
- Club: Kolbotn IL

Reidar Merli (1 April 1917 – 29 December 2007) was a Norwegian wrestler. He was born in Aurskog-Høland, and represented the club Kolbotn IL. He competed in Greco-Roman wrestling at the 1948 Summer Olympics in London, where he placed sixth (shared), and at the 1952 Summer Olympics in Helsinki, where he placed fifth.

He won a silver medal in bantam weight at the 1947 European Wrestling Championships.
