= Karl Kerbach =

Austrian footballer

Personal information
- Date of birth: 30 September 1918
- Date of death: 28 November 1994 (aged 76)

International career
| Years | Team | Apps | (Gls) |
| 1946 | Austria | 1 | (0) |

Karl Kerbach (30 September 1918 – 28 November 1994) was an Austrian footballer. He played in one match for the Austria national football team in 1946.
