= Maurice Faure (wrestler) =

French wrestler

Personal information
- Nationality: French
- Born: 5 June 1927 Clermont-Ferrand, France
- Died: 27 December 2014 (aged 87)

Sport
- Sport: Wrestling

Maurice Faure (5 June 1927 – 27 December 2013) was a French wrestler. He competed in the men's Greco-Roman bantamweight at the 1952 Summer Olympics.

== Life and career ==
Maurice Faure was born on June 5, 1927 in Clermont-Ferrand, France. He started his career in the mid-1940s when professional wrestling in France blended athletic competition with theatrical performance. Faure competed in many countries in Europe.

== Personal life ==
Faure has a twin brother named Edmond Faure, a wrestler who competed in 1948 Summer Olympics and 1952 Summer Olympics.
