= Carlos Thompson (footballer) =

Mexican footballer (1924–1994)

Personal information
- Full name: Carlos Thompson Durand
- Date of birth: 1924
- Place of birth: Mexico City, Mexico
- Date of death: 4 November 1994 (aged 69–70)
- Place of death: Mexico City, Mexico

International career
Years	Team	Apps	(Gls)
- Mexico

Carlos Thompson Durand (1924 – 4 November 1994) was a Mexican footballer. He competed in the men's tournament at the 1948 Summer Olympics.
