= Ovidiu Forai =

Romanian wrestler

Personal information
- Nationality: Romanian
- Born: 15 June 1919 Craiova, Romania
- Died: 26 July 1979 (aged 60) Surduc, Romania

Sport
- Sport: Wrestling

Ovidiu Forai (15 June 1919 – 26 July 1979) was a Romanian wrestler. He competed in the men's Greco-Roman light heavyweight at the 1952 Summer Olympics.
