= Marco Antonio Girón =

Guatemalan wrestler

Personal information
- Nationality: Guatemalan
- Born: 26 March 1926
- Died: 2012 (aged 85–86)

Sport
- Sport: Wrestling

Marco Antonio Girón (26 March 1926 – 2012) was a Guatemalan wrestler. He competed in two events at the 1952 Summer Olympics.
