= Edgar Hennig =

American baseball player and football coach

Biographical details
- Born: January 9, 1897; Yorktown, Texas, U.S.
- Died: November 17, 1994 (aged 97); Tyler, Texas, U.S.
- Education: Texas State

Playing career

Baseball
- 1925: Tyler Trojans
- 1926: Austin Senators
- 1927: Palestine Pals
- 1929: Ballinger Bearcats
- Position: Pitcher (baseball)

Coaching career (HC unless noted)

Football
- 1921: Texas Lutheran

Head coaching record
- Overall: 3–0

Edgar Albert Hennig (January 9, 1897 – November 17, 1994) was an American minor league baseball player and football coach. He served as the head football coach at Texas Lutheran University in 1921, compiling a record of 3–0.
