= Abdullah Jaroudi Sr. =

Lebanese sports shooter

Personal information
- Born: 1909

Sport
- Sport: Sports shooting

Abdullah Jaroudi Sr. (born 1909, date of death unknown) was a Lebanese sports shooter. He competed in the 50 m rifle, prone event at the 1952 Summer Olympics. His son competed at the 1960 Summer Olympics.
