= Abdel Aal Rashed =

Egyptian wrestler (born 1927)

Medal record

Men's Greco-Roman wrestling

Representing Egypt

Olympic Games
Bronze medal – third place	1952 Helsinki	Featherweight

Abdel Aal Ahmed Rashed (Arabic: عبد العال راشد, born 27 December 1927) was a featherweight (57–61 kg) wrestler who was a member of the Egyptian team at the 1952 Summer Olympics in Helsinki. He won a bronze medal, which was the only podium finish for Egypt that year. He was born in Alexandria.

== See also ==
- List of Egyptians
