= Gunnar Håkansson =

Swedish Greco-Roman wrestler

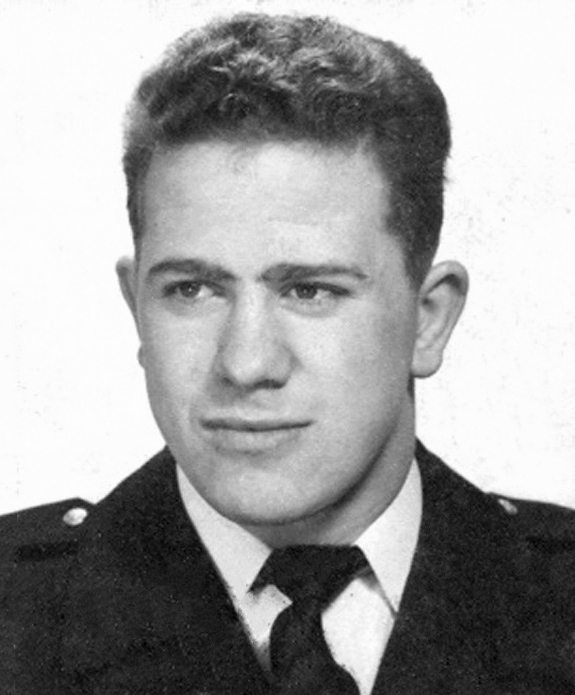

Personal information
- Born: 23 July 1926 Malmö, Sweden
- Died: 4 August 2009 (aged 83) Malmö, Sweden

Sport
- Sport: Greco-Roman wrestling
- Club: GAK Enighet, Malmö
Medal record
Men's wrestling (Greco-Roman)
Representing Sweden
World Championships
| Bronze medal – third place | 1955 Karlsruhe | -62 kg |

Erik Martin Gunnar Håkansson (23 July 1926 – 4 August 2009) was a featherweight Greco-Roman wrestler from Sweden who won a bronze medal at the 1955 World Championships. He competed at the 1952 and 1956 Olympics and finished fifth in 1956.
