= Ron Hall (Australian footballer, born 1921) =

Australian rules footballer

Personal information
- Full name: Ronald Clyde Hall
- Born: 17 April 1921; Brighton, Victoria
- Died: 16 November 1994 (aged 73)
- Original team: Brighton (VFA)
- Height: 185 cm (6 ft 1 in)
- Weight: 89 kg (196 lb)

Playing career^{1}
Years	Club	Games (Goals)
1944–1947	Melbourne	17 (2)
- ^{1} Playing statistics correct to the end of 1947.

Ronald Clyde Hall (17 April 1921 – 16 November 1994) was an Australian rules footballer who played with Melbourne in the Victorian Football League (VFL).

== Career ==
Hall, a defender, was originally from Brighton, in the Victorian Football Association (VFA). He joined South Melbourne in the 1941 pre-season and was offered a place on their list, but opted to return to Brighton.

Following a stint in Sydney playing for St George, Hall joined Melbourne in 1944. Restricted by army commitments, he made only five appearances in his first two years with Melbourne. In the 1946 VFL season he played in the opening eight rounds, but didn't feature in the side for the rest of the year. He played four games in 1947, before being cleared back to Brighton mid-season, where he gained immediate selection at full-back.

In 1948 he was suspended for 12 weeks on a charge of kicking and as a result missed out playing in Brighton's only VFA premiership. At that year's club awards, Hall was named "Best Clubman" and he would remain at Brighton for several more seasons.
