= Kelpo Gröndahl =

Finnish Greco-Roman wrestler (1920–1994)

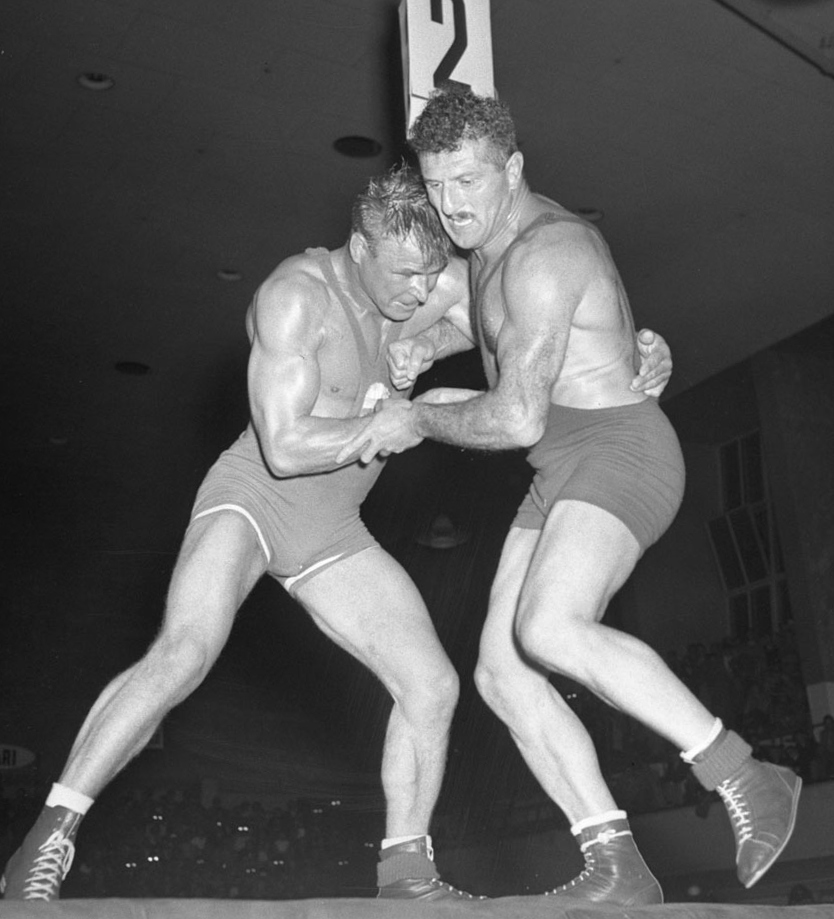
- Gröndahl (left) vs. Shalva Chikhladze in the 1952 Olympic final

Personal information
- Born: 28 March 1920 Porin maalaiskunta, Finland
- Died: 2 August 1994 (aged 74) Pori, Finland

Sport
- Sport: Greco-Roman wrestling
- Club: Reposaaren Kunto, Pori
Medal record
Men's Greco-Roman wrestling
Representing Finland
Olympic Games
Gold medal – first place	1952 Helsinki	Light heavyweight
Silver medal – second place	1948 London	Light heavyweight
World Championships
Silver medal – second place	1953 Napoli	Light heavyweight

Kelpo Olavi Gröndahl (28 March 1920 – 2 August 1994) was a light-heavyweight Greco-Roman wrestler from Finland. He competed at the 1948 and 1952 Olympics and won a silver and a gold medal, respectively. He won another silver medal at the 1953 World Championships and finished fifth at the 1947 European Championships. Domestically he won 15 national titles, 11 in Greco-Roman (1943, 1946–1955) and 4 in freestyle wrestling (1948–1950, 1952).

Gröndahl retired from competitions after failing to qualify for the 1956 Olympics. Between 1953 and 1980 he worked as the harbormaster of the Port of Pori. He also became a member of the Pori City Council and then a member of the Pori City board of directors. In 1962–1970 he was a member of the Parliament of Finland, representing the Finnish People's Democratic League, and was elected as a presidential elector in 1956, 1962 and 1968. In 1982 he was awarded the Golden Cross of Merit by the Finnish Ministry of Education. A park in the Reposaari district of Pori is named after him.

Gröndahl was married and had four children, born in 1946, 1947, 1949 and 1956.
