= Leo Cortsen =

Danish wrestler (1930–2007)

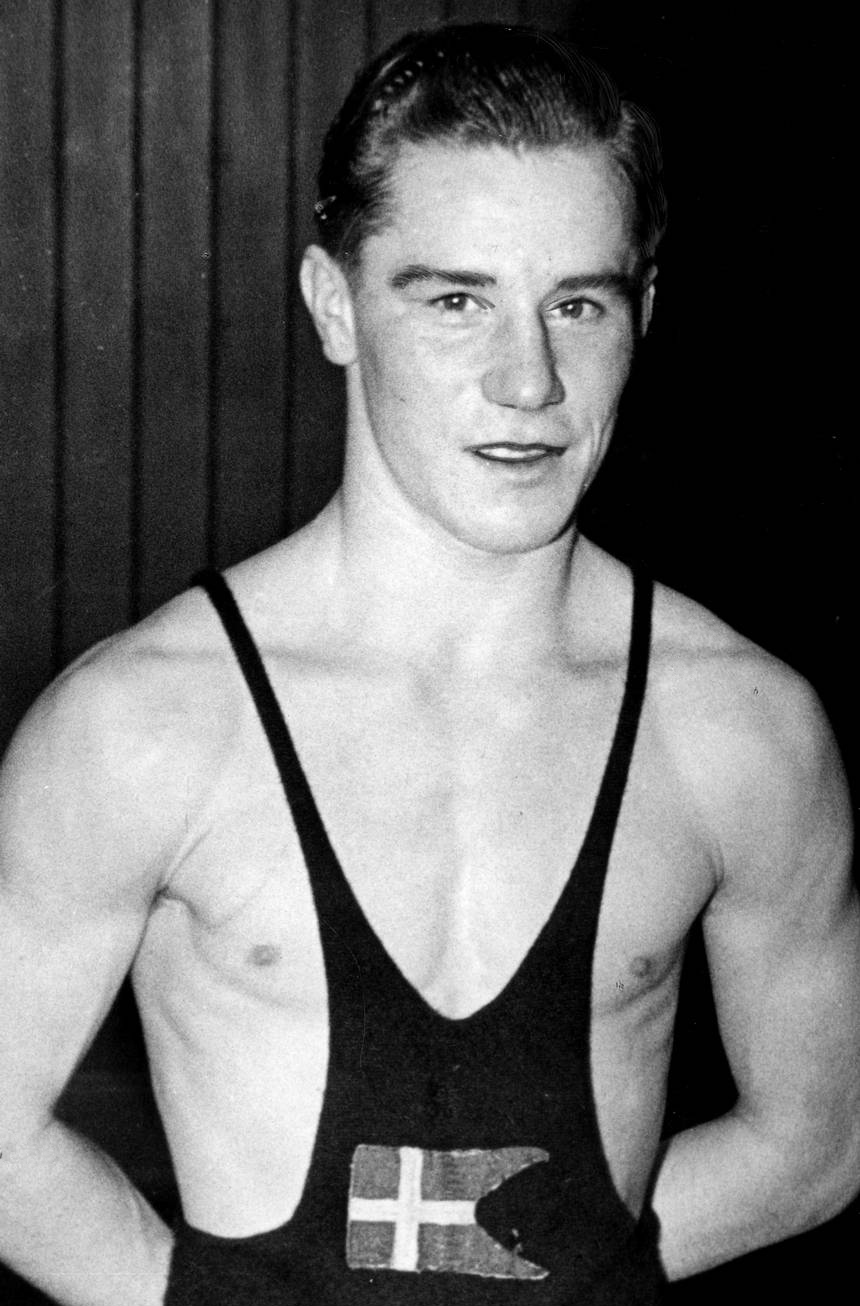
- Leo Cortsen in 1949

Personal information
- Born: 13 July 1930 Braband, Århus, Denmark
- Died: 23 May 2007 (aged 76)

Sport
- Sport: Greco-Roman wrestling
- Club: Thrott, Åbyhøj

Leo Cortsen (13 July 1930 – 23 May 2007) was a Danish bantamweight Greco-Roman wrestler. He competed in the 1952 Summer Olympics, but was eliminated in the second bout. Cortsen died on 23 May 2007, at the age of 76.
