= Zakaria Chihab =

Lebanese wrestler (1926–1984)

Medal record

Men's Greco-Roman wrestling

Representing Lebanon

Olympic Games
Silver medal – second place	1952 Helsinki	Bantamweight

Zakaria Chihab (5 March 1926 – November 1984) was a Lebanese wrestler. At the 1952 Summer Olympics, he won the silver medal in the men's Greco-Roman Bantamweight category. He moved to Kuwait in the 1960s and died there in the 1980s.
