= Yakiv Punkin =

Soviet wrestler

Personal information
- Born: 8 December 1921 Zaporizhia, Ukrainian SSR
- Died: 12 October 1994 (aged 72) Zaporizhia, Ukraine

Sport
- Sport: Greco-Roman wrestling
- Club: Metallurg Zaporizhia
Medal record
Men's Greco-Roman wrestling
Representing the Soviet Union
Olympic Games
Gold medal – first place	1952 Helsinki	62 kg

Yakov Grigorievich Punkin (Russian: Яков Григорьевич Пункин; 8 December 1921 – 12 October 1994) was a featherweight Greco-Roman wrestler from Ukraine. Competing for the Soviet Union he won a gold medal at the 1952 Olympics. He placed fifth at the 1953 World Championships. He became the first Olympic gold champion born on the territory of the modern Ukraine.

== Biography ==
Punkin was Jewish. He took up wrestling in 1938, while working at a factory as a turner. At the onset of World War II in 1941 he joined the Soviet Army, but was soon captured by the Germans and spent the rest of the war in German prisoner-of-war camps: until summer 1942 in Emsland, in 1942–1945 in Osnabrück, and later in 1945 near Magdeburg. Throughout those year Punkin posed as a Muslim Ossetian man, hiding his Jewish origin, else he would be shot much earlier than many of his cellmates. When he was liberated by Soviet troops in 1945 he weighed only 36 kg.

Between 1945 and 1948 Punkin served with the Soviet Army, where he continued wrestling and won the 1947 Army championships. He then won four Soviet titles, in 1949–50 and in 1954–55. After retiring from competitions he worked as a wrestling coach in his native city of Zaporizhzhia.

Punkin had a son, Grigory, who lives in Israel. A wrestling tournament is held annually in his honor in Zaporizhia.
