= Imre Hódos =

Hungarian wrestler (1928–1989)

Medal record

Representing Hungary

Men's Greco-Roman wrestling

Olympic Games
| Gold medal – first place | 1952 Helsinki | Bantamweight |

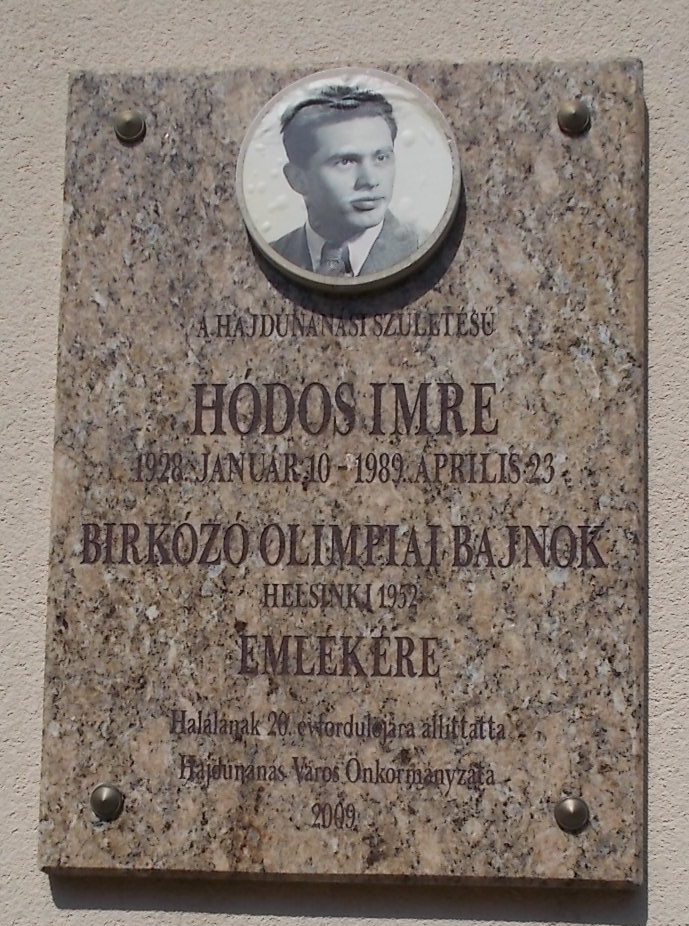

Imre Hódos (January 10, 1928 – April 23, 1989) was a Hungarian wrestler who was born in Hajdúnánás and died in Debrecen. He was an Olympic champion in Greco-Roman wrestling.

== Olympics ==
Hódos competed at the 1952 Summer Olympics in Helsinki where he received a gold medal in Greco-Roman wrestling, the bantamweight class. He also competed at the 1956 Summer Olympics and the 1960 Summer Olympics.
