= Arvo Kyllönen =

Finnish wrestler (1932–2017)

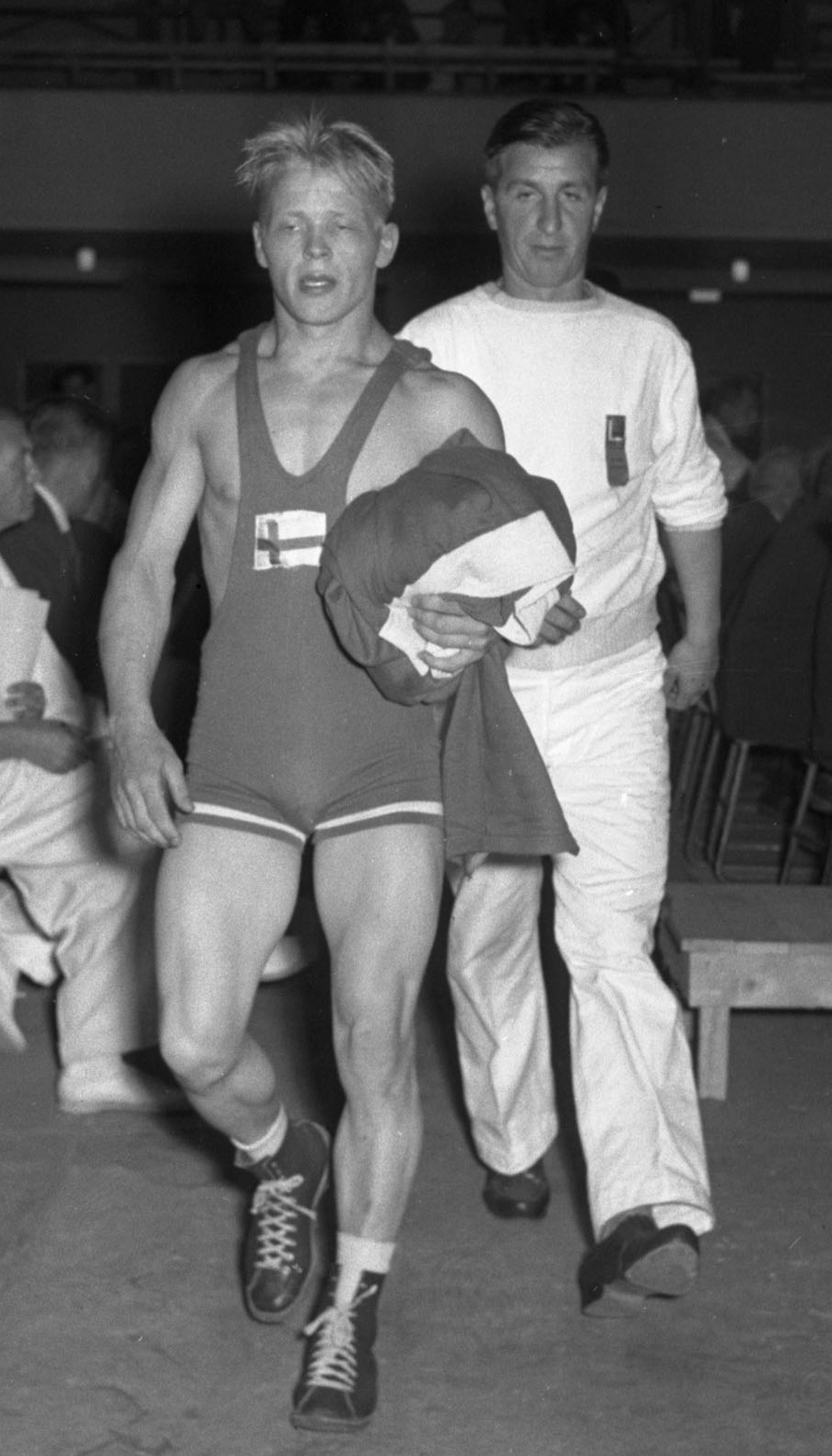
- Kyllönen with coach at the 1952 Olympics

Personal information
- Born: 17 December 1932 Imatra, Finland
- Died: 10 June 2017 (aged 84)

Sport
- Sport: Wrestling
- Club: TUL

Arvo Kyllönen (17 December 1932 – 10 June 2017) was a Finnish wrestler who won national titles in the 57 kg freestyle (1952) and 62 kg Greco-Roman divisions (1954). He competed in Greco-Roman bantamweight at the 1952 Summer Olympics, but was eliminated in the third round. Kyllönen was a firefighter by profession. After retiring from competitions he also coached young wrestlers.
