= Ion Popescu (wrestler) =

Romanian wrestler

Personal information
- Nationality: Romanian
- Born: 28 April 1929; Slivna, Romania

Sport
- Sport: Wrestling

Ion Popescu (born 28 April 1929) is a Romanian former wrestler. He competed at the 1952 Summer Olympics and the 1956 Summer Olympics.
