= Deaths in August 2007 =

The following is a list of notable deaths in August 2007.

Entries for each day are listed alphabetically by surname. A typical entry lists information in the following sequence:

- Name, age, country of citizenship at birth, subsequent country of citizenship (if applicable), reason for notability, cause of death (if known), and reference.

== August 2007 ==
=== 1 ===
- Wbaldino Acosta, 69, Argentine politician, Governor of San Juan Province (2002–2003).
- Sergei Antonov, 59, Bulgarian accused of involvement in attempt by Mehmet Ali Ağca to kill Pope John Paul II.
- Ryan Cox, 28, South African professional road racing cyclist, ruptured artery following vascular surgery.
- Robert Hughes, 95, Australian composer.
- Veikko Karvonen, 81, Finnish athlete and Olympian (1952, 1956).
- Winfred P. Lehmann, 91, American linguist.
- Tommy Makem, 74, Irish folk musician (The Clancy Brothers and Tommy Makem), lung cancer.
- Pete Naktenis, 93, American baseball player.
- Phillip S. Paludan, 69, American history professor, authority on Abraham Lincoln and the American Civil War.
- Norman Adrian Wiggins, 83, American third president of Campbell University.

=== 2 ===
- Kafeel Ahmed, 28, Indian terrorist involved in the 2007 Glasgow International Airport attack, third degree burns.
- Ângelo, 54, Brazilian footballer and Olympian (1972).
- Haitham al-Badri, Iraqi al Qaeda emir of Salahuddin Province and Golden Dome bomber, airstrike.
- Chauncey Bailey, 57, American journalist, editor of The Oakland Post, shot.
- Ed Brown, 78, American football quarterback (Chicago Bears, Pittsburgh Steelers, Baltimore Colts), prostate cancer.
- Franco Dalla Valle, 62, Brazilian Roman Catholic Bishop of Juína.
- Evan Enwerem, 71, Nigerian Senate President (1999).
- Peter Eriksson, 48, Swedish neuroscientist.
- Terry Kelly, 75, English footballer (Luton Town), dementia.
- Holden Roberto, 84, Angolan founder and leader of the FNLA (1962–1999), after long illness.
- Frank Rosenfelt, 85, American executive at MGM.

=== 3 ===
- José Miguel Battle Sr., 77, Cuban founder and nominal leader of the "Cuban Mafia".
- Ron Brown, 67, British Labour Party MP (1979–1992), liver failure.
- James T. Callahan, 76, American actor (Charles in Charge), cancer.
- Aydoğan Çipiloğlu, 72, Turkish Olympic footballer (1960).
- Peter Connelly, 1, British murder victim.
- John Gardner, 80, British thriller writer and James Bond continuation novelist, suspected heart failure.
- Lee Griffeth, 82, American baseball player (Philadelphia Athletics).
- Nasho Kamungeremu, 34, Zimbabwean golfer, heart attack.

=== 4 ===
- Lee Hazlewood, 78, American country music singer and songwriter ("These Boots Are Made for Walkin'"), renal cancer.
- Raul Hilberg, 81, Austrian Jewish Holocaust historian, lung cancer.
- Frank Mancuso, 89, American Major League Baseball player, Houston City Councillor.
- Santos Padilla Ferrer, 50, Puerto Rican mayor of Cabo Rojo, heart attack.

=== 5 ===
- Henri Amouroux, 87, French journalist and historian.
- Duncan W. Clark, 96, American physician.
- Stanley Myron Handelman, 77, American comedian, heart attack.
- Oliver Hill, 100, American lawyer, lead attorney on the Brown v. Board of Education case.
- Jean-Marie Lustiger, 80, French Jewish-born Roman Catholic Archbishop Emeritus of Paris, cancer.
- Amos Manor, 89, Israeli head of Shin Bet (1953–1963).
- Janine Niépce, 86, French photojournalist.
- Florian Pittiș, 63, Romanian actor and folk singer, prostate cancer.
- Peter Graham Scott, 83, British film producer.

=== 6 ===
- Heinz Barth, 86, German SS officer, Nazi war criminal, cancer.
- Lamar Blount, 87, American football player (Miami Seahawks, Buffalo Bills, Baltimore Colts).
- Zsolt Daczi, 37, Hungarian guitarist, cancer.
- Mosess Fishman, 92, American representative of the Abraham Lincoln Brigade, pancreatic cancer.
- Kareem Rashad Sultan Khan, 20, United States Army specialist, killed in action.
- Ah Jook Ku, 97, American journalist and writer, first Asian American Associated Press reporter.
- Élie de Rothschild, 90, French banker, member of Rothschild dynasty, heart attack.
- Paul Rutherford, 67, British trombonist.
- Atle Selberg, 90, Norwegian-born American mathematician, heart failure.

=== 7 ===
- Ernesto Alonso, 90, Mexican television producer and actor, pneumonia.
- Hal Fishman, 75, American television news anchor since 1960, KTLA Prime News anchor since 1975, cancer.
- Gato Del Sol, 28, American racehorse, won 1982 Kentucky Derby, euthanized.
- Per Henriksen, 77, Danish footballer.
- Russell Johnson, 83, American architect and acoustician.
- Peter Lamana, 86, American football player (Chicago Rockets).
- Hank Morgenweck, 78, American baseball umpire, cancer.
- Wolfgang Sievers, 93, Australian photographer.
- Sir Angus Tait, 88, New Zealand electronics innovator and businessman.
- William F. Walker, 69, American academic, President of Auburn University (2001–2004).

=== 8 ===
- Bertha Crowther, 85, British Olympic athlete (1948).
- Richard Dahl, 74, Swedish high jumper.
- Joybubbles, 58, American phone phreak.
- Daniel Lam, 85, Hong Kong businessman.
- Ma Lik, 55, Hong Kong Legislative Council member and chair of the DAB, colon cancer.
- Melville Shavelson, 90, American film director and screenwriter.
- Clarence Tex Walker, 61, American rhythm and blues musician, heart attack.
- Julius Wess, 73, Austrian physicist.

=== 9 ===
- Sakiusa Bulicokocoko, 57, Fijian musician, tumor.
- Richmond Flowers Sr., 88, American Attorney General of Alabama (1963–1967).
- Timothy Garden, Baron Garden, 63, British Air Marshal and Liberal Democrat peer, cancer.
- Joe O'Donnell, 85, American presidential photographer, photographed effects of Hiroshima bombing, stroke.
- Ulrich Plenzdorf, 72, German author.
- Rolf Wiik, 78, Finnish Olympic fencer.

=== 10 ===
- Henry Cabot Lodge Bohler, 82, American civil rights campaigner, member of Tuskegee Airmen, brain injuries following a fall.
- Shagdaryn Chanrav, 58, Mongolian Olympic judoka (1976).
- Tom Cheasty, 73, Irish hurler.
- James E. Faust, 87, American second counselor in the First Presidency of the LDS Church.
- Irene Morgan, 90, American civil rights campaigner, complications of Alzheimer's disease.
- Jean Rédélé, 85, French creator of the Alpine automobile brand.
- Mario Rivera, 68, Dominican Latin jazz saxophonist with Machito, Tito Puente, Tito Rodríguez orchestras, bone cancer.
- Tony Wilson, 57, British owner of Factory Records, radio and TV presenter, journalist, heart attack.

=== 11 ===
- Franz Antel, 94, Austrian film director.
- Alessandra Finesso, 51, Italian swimmer and Olympian (1972).
- Michael Frede, 67, German professor of Ancient Philosophy, swimming accident.
- MacDonald Gallion, 94, American politician, Attorney General of Alabama (1959–1963, 1967–1971).
- Joe Jimenez, 81, American professional golfer, won 1978 Senior PGA Championship, renal failure brought on by lung cancer.
- Alexander H. Leighton, 99, American-Canadian sociologist and psychiatrist.
- Ramiro de León, 69, Uruguayan Olympic basketball player (1964).
- Arthur Levenson, 93, American Army Officer, NSA official and cryptologist.
- Roberto Maidana, 79, Argentine journalist, pneumonia.
- Herb Pomeroy, 77, American jazz trumpeter (Charlie Parker, Frank Sinatra), cancer.
- Sukadji Ranuwihardjo, 76, Indonesian President of Gadjah Mada University (1973–1981).
- Lluís Maria Xirinacs, 75, Spanish Catalan political activist and priest, natural causes.
- Zhang Shuhong, 50, Chinese businessman and factory co-owner involved in Fisher-Price toy recall, suicide by hanging.

=== 12 ===
- Ralph Asher Alpher, 86, American physicist and college professor, respiratory failure.
- Ronald N. Bracewell, 86, Australian physicist and radio astronomer, heart failure.
- Christian Elder, 38, American sports car and Busch Series driver.
- Joan Finnigan, 81, Canadian writer and poet.
- Jonathan Gillman, 72, Australian Olympic sports shooter (1976).
- Merv Griffin, 82, American talk show host, real estate tycoon, creator of Jeopardy! and Wheel of Fortune, prostate cancer.
- Asa Grant Hilliard III, 73, American educationalist, historian and psychologist, malaria.
- Allen McClure, 72, American Olympic sailor
- Sir Ian McGeoch, 93, British admiral.
- Elizabeth Murray, 66, American artist, lung cancer.
- Mike Wieringo, 44, American comic book artist (The Flash, Spider-Man, Fantastic Four), heart attack.

=== 13 ===
- Brian "Crush" Adams, 44, American professional wrestler, accidental overdose of pain killers and anti-depressants.
- Brooke Astor, 105, American philanthropist, pneumonia.
- Laurent Bernier, 85, Canadian Olympic ski jumper (1948).
- Paul Boyd, 39, American-born Canadian animator, shot.
- Ox Miller, 92, American baseball player (Washington Senators).
- Clifton Neita, 92, Jamaican editor of The Gleaner newspaper (1954–1979).
- Chiara Poggi, 26, Italian murder victim, stabbed.
- Phil Rizzuto, 89, American baseball player, member of the MLB Hall of Fame, and sports broadcaster, pneumonia.
- Tim Royes, 42, British music video director, car accident.

=== 14 ===
- John Biffen, 76, British Conservative member of the House of Lords, MP (1961–1997), septicaemia.
- Horace Brearley, 94, British cricketer.
- Jirair S. Hovnanian, 80, Armenian Iraqi-American home builder.
- Stig Johansson, 83, Swedish Olympic water polo player (1952).
- Tikhon Khrennikov, 94, Russian Soviet-era cultural functionary, composer and pianist.
- Emory King, 76, Belizean historian, author and journalist, cancer.
- John Lanham, 82, American former chief justice of the Republic of the Marshall Islands.
- Diane Lewis, 54, American reporter (The Boston Globe), cancer.
- Kotozakura Masakatsu, 66, Japanese yokozuna, complications of diabetes.
- Eduardo Noriega, 90, Mexican actor, heart attack.
- Kihei Tomioka, 75, Japanese Olympic cyclist.
- Sayoko Yamaguchi, 57, Japanese fashion model, pneumonia.

=== 15 ===
- Richard Bradshaw, 63, British conductor, Canadian Opera Company general director (1998–2007), heart attack.
- Steven Campbell, 53, British painter, ruptured appendix.
- Adrian G. Duplantier, 78, American politician and district judge (United States District Court for the Eastern District of Louisiana).
- John Gofman, 88, American nuclear physicist, heart failure.
- Geoffrey Orbell, 98, New Zealand bush walker who rediscovered the takahē in 1948.
- Sam Pollock, 81, Canadian former general manager of Montreal Canadiens, Hockey Hall of Famer.
- Liam Rector, 58, American poet, Folger Shakespeare Library program director, suicide by gunshot.
- John Wallowitch, 81, American singer and songwriter, bone cancer.

=== 16 ===
- Bahaedin Adab, 62, Iranian member of parliament, cancer.
- John Blewett III, 33, American NASCAR driver, racing crash.
- Jeroen Boere, 39, Dutch football player (West Ham, West Bromwich Albion, Crystal Palace, Portsmouth, Southend).
- Will Edwards, 69, British Labour politician, MP for Merioneth (1966–1974).
- Clive Exton, 77, British television and film writer, brain cancer.
- Roland Mathias, 91, British poet and literary critic.
- Robert Mignat, 86, French cyclist.
- The Missing Link, 68, Canadian professional wrestler, cancer.
- Vito Pallavicini, 83, Italian lyricist/pop composer.
- Max Roach, 83, American jazz drummer.

=== 17 ===
- John Austin, 68, British Anglican prelate, Bishop of Aston (1992–2005).
- Edward Avedisian, 71, American artist.
- John M. Belk, 87, American Democratic politician, mayor of Charlotte, North Carolina (1969–1977).
- Jos Brink, 65, Dutch television host, actor, minister of religion and writer, colorectal cancer.
- Bill Deedes, 94, British journalist, editor of The Daily Telegraph (1974–1986) and Conservative politician.
- Franco Foschi, 76, Italian writer and politician.
- Chico García, 82, Mexican baseball player (Baltimore Orioles).
- Carolyn Goodman, 91, American psychologist and civil rights activist.
- Eddie Griffin, 25, American basketball player (Seton Hall Pirates, Houston Rockets, Minnesota Timberwolves), car accident.
- Max Hodge, 91, American television writer, creator of Mr. Freeze on the 1960s Batman series.
- Victor Klee, 81, American mathematician, complications of intestinal surgery.
- Kazuhiro Kuroda, 82, Japanese baseball player.
- Tanja Liedtke, 29, German choreographer appointed as Sydney Dance Company artistic director, road accident.
- Elmer MacFadyen, 64, Canadian politician, Prince Edward Island Progressive Conservative cabinet minister (1996–2007), heart attack.
- Alison Plowden, 75, British historian.

=== 18 ===
- Stephen Bicknell, 49, British expert on the pipe organ.
- Michael Deaver, 69, American Deputy White House Chief of Staff (1981–1985), pancreatic cancer.
- Norman Ickeringill, 84, Australian Olympic wrestler (1956).
- Lucien Jarraud, 84, Canadian radio host.
- Jon Lucien, 65, American smooth jazz singer/songwriter, respiratory failure and complications of kidney surgery.
- Magdalen Nabb, 60, British author, stroke.
- Viktor Prokopenko, 62, Ukrainian footballer and coach (FC Shakhtar Donetsk), thrombus.

=== 19 ===
- Daniel Brewster, 83, American Senator (Democrat) from Maryland (1963–1969), liver cancer.
- Perry DeAngelis, 43, American podcaster, scleroderma.
- Gilles Fabre, 73, French painter.
- Francis Ryck, 87, French author of crime and spy novels.

=== 20 ===
- Burr Baldwin, 85, American football player (UCLA Bruins, Los Angeles Dons).
- Gabriel Glorieux, 77, Belgian Olympic cyclist (1952).
- Berthold Grünfeld, 75, Norwegian psychiatrist.
- Wild Bill Hagy, 68, American Baltimore Orioles cheerleader of the 1970s and 1980s.
- Leona Helmsley, 87, American hotelier, heart failure.
- Chas Poynter, 68, New Zealand politician, mayor of Wanganui (1986–2004), lung disease.
- Roch La Salle, 78, Canadian Progressive Conservative politician, Quebec cabinet minister (1968–1988).

=== 21 ===
- Caroline Aigle, 32, French aviator, first French female fighter pilot, cancer.
- Rose Bampton, 99, American opera singer.
- Frank Bowe, 60, American disability rights activist, author and teacher, cancer.
- Čabulītis, 71–72, American alligator considered to be Europe's oldest.
- Antonio De Gaetano, 73, Italian Olympic racewalker (1960).
- Siobhan Dowd, 47, British writer and PEN activist, breast cancer.
- Rafael González, 87, Argentine Olympic fencer (1960, 1964).
- Elizabeth Hoisington, 88, American Army general, heart failure.
- Howe Yoon Chong, 84, Singaporean politician.
- Qurratulain Hyder, 81, Indian novelist.
- Wilfried Kemmer, 63, German footballer.
- Hana Ponická, 85, Slovak writer and dissident.
- Adam Watson, 93, British diplomat and academic.

=== 22 ===
- Hans Bänninger, 83, Swiss Olympic ice hockey player (1948, 1952).
- Butch van Breda Kolff, 84, American basketball coach (Princeton, Lakers, Pistons, Jazz).
- José Ribamar Celestino, 65, Brazilian footballer.
- Jacek Chmielnik, 54, Polish actor, accidental electrocution.
- Graeme Hansen, 73, New Zealand equestrian and Olympian (1964).
- Keith Knight, 51, Canadian actor, brain cancer.
- Sir Patrick Macnaghten, 11th Baronet, 80, British aristocrat.
- Grace Paley, 84, American writer and political activist, breast cancer.

=== 23 ===
- Cuesta Benberry, 83, American historian known for her studies of quilting, congestive heart failure.
- Bobby Herrera, 81, American baseball player (St. Louis Browns).
- Alvin Jones, 90, Canadian ice hockey player (Detroit Red Wings, Toronto Maple Leafs).
- William John McKeag, 79, Canadian politician, Lieutenant Governor of Manitoba (1970–1976).
- David Perry, 78, New Zealand cricketer.
- Martti Pokela, 83, Finnish folk musician.
- Robert Symonds, 80, American actor (Dynasty, The Exorcist, Catch Me If You Can), prostate cancer.
- Dušan Třeštík, 74, Czech historian.
- Sir Philip Wilkinson, 80, British banker.

=== 24 ===
- Abdul Rahman Arif, 91, Iraqi politician, President of Iraq (1966–1968).
- Mark Birley, 77, British nightclub owner (Annabel's), stroke.
- Andrée Boucher, 70, Canadian politician, mayor of Sainte-Foy (1985–2001) and Quebec City (2005–2007), heart attack.
- Mario Chávez, 78, Argentine Olympic swimmer (1948).
- William E. McAnulty Jr., 59, American lawyer, first African American Kentucky Supreme Court Justice, lung cancer.
- Aaron Russo, 64, American movie producer (Trading Places, The Rose), cancer.

=== 25 ===
- Benjamin Aaron, 91, American labor law expert and member of Presidential commissions, cerebral hemorrhage.
- Raymond Barre, 83, French economist, Prime Minister of France (1976–1981), Mayor of Lyon (1995–2001).
- Jim Carlson, 74, American screenwriter.
- Eduardo Prado Coelho, 63, Portuguese writer and political and cultural critic.
- Richard Cook, 50, British jazz writer, cancer.
- Édouard Gagnon, 89, Canadian Roman Catholic Cardinal.
- Pedro Galasso, 77, Brazilian Olympic boxer (1952).
- Ann Hovey, 95, American chorus girl and minor film actress of the 1930s, she was selected as a WAMPAS Baby Star in 1934,she died four days shy of her 96th birthday
- Ray Jones, 18, British footballer (QPR), car accident.
- Alberto de Lacerda, 78, Portuguese poet, BBC radio presenter, founded Portucale magazine.
- Linda Smith, 58, Canadian writer.

=== 26 ===
- Edward Brandt Jr., 74, American doctor and public health official, directed initial response to AIDS, lung cancer.
- Oliver Byrne, 63, Irish CEO of soccer club Shelbourne F.C., after short illness.
- Chuck Comiskey, 81, American Chicago White Sox executive in the 1950s, grandson of team founder Charles Comiskey.
- Mike Freeman, 70, British Olympic bobsledder (1968, 1972).
- Harry Lempio, 75, German Olympic boxer (1960).
- Roy McLean, 77, South African cricketer, after long illness.
- Judah Nadich, 95, American rabbi and chaplain, heart attack.
- Edward Seidensticker, 86, American scholar and translator of Japanese literature, complications from a fall.
- Gaston Thorn, 78, Luxembourg Prime Minister (1974–1979), President of the European Commission (1981–1985).

=== 27 ===
- Driss Basri, 69, Moroccan Interior Minister (1979–1999).
- Galina Dzhugashvili, 68, Russian granddaughter of Joseph Stalin, cancer.
- Burkhard Gantenbein, 95, Swiss Olympic handball player (1936).
- Richard T. Heffron, 76, American film and television director.
- Eduardo Malapit, 74, American who was first mayor of Filipino American ancestry.
- Emma Penella, 77, Spanish actress (El Verdugo, Aquí no hay quien viva), renal and heart failure.
- Doug Riley, 62, Canadian musician ("Doctor Music"), heart failure.
- Hans Ruesch, 94, Swiss racing driver, author and activist against animal testing.
- Gad Yaacobi, 72, Israeli former Minister and Labor Party Knesset member, heart failure.

=== 28 ===
- Anacleto Angelini, 93, Chilean businessman, South America's richest man, emphysema.
- David Garcia, 63, American journalist, White House correspondent (ABC), complications of a liver condition.
- Arthur Jones, 80, American inventor of the Nautilus exercise machines.
- Hilly Kristal, 75, American club owner (CBGB), complications of lung cancer.
- Smain Lamari, 67, Algerian head of intelligence services, after long illness.
- Paul MacCready, 81, American aviation pioneer and inventor.
- Nikola Nobilo, 94, Croatian-born New Zealand winemaker.
- Antonio Puerta, 22, Spanish footballer (Sevilla FC), arrhythmogenic right ventricular dysplasia.
- Darryl Sly, 68, Canadian Olympic ice hockey player.
- Francisco Umbral, 72, Spanish writer, pneumonia.
- Miyoshi Umeki, 78, Japanese-born American actress (Sayonara, Flower Drum Song, The Courtship of Eddie's Father), Oscar winner (1958), cancer.

=== 29 ===
- Sir James Fletcher, 92, New Zealand industrialist (Fletcher Challenge).
- Aldo Forte, 89, American football player (Chicago Bears, Detroit Lions, Green Bay Packers).
- Amos Harris, 86, American football player (Mississippi State Bulldogs, Brooklyn Dodgers).
- Richard Jewell, 44, American security guard wrongly accused of the Atlanta Olympics bombing, diabetes.
- Margie Lang, 83, American baseball player (AAGPBL).
- Vladimir Lobanov, 53, Russian Olympic speed skater.
- Pierre Messmer, 91, French Prime Minister (1972–1974), Free French fighter, French Academician.
- Chaswe Nsofwa, 28, Zambian footballer, heart attack.
- Alfred Peet, 87, American entrepreneur and the founder of Peet's Coffee & Tea.

=== 30 ===
- Ramrao Adik, 77, Indian former Deputy Chief Minister of Maharashtra.
- János Börzsei, 85, Hungarian footballer and Olympian (1952).
- Banarsi Das Gupta, 89, Indian former Chief Minister of Haryana.
- Augustine Harris, 89, British Bishop Emeritus of Middlesbrough, former Auxiliary Bishop of Liverpool.
- Michael Jackson, 65, British writer and beer expert (The Beer Hunter), heart attack.
- Hal Jeffcoat, 82, American baseball player (Chicago Cubs, Cincinnati Redlegs/Reds, St. Louis Cardinals).
- Nancy Littlefield, 77, American film producer, cancer.
- K. P. H. Notoprojo, 98, Indonesian gamelan performer.
- Igor Novikov, 77, Soviet Olympic modern pentathlete.
- Onghokham, 74, Indonesian historian.
- Charles Vanik, 94, American politician, U.S. Representative from Ohio (1955–1981).
- José Luis de Vilallonga, 9th Marquess of Castellbell, 87, Spanish aristocrat, author and actor (Breakfast at Tiffany's).
- John Wedgwood, 87, British physician.

=== 31 ===
- Gay Brewer, 75, American professional golfer, lung cancer.
- Willie Cunningham, 77, British football player.
- Barton Kirkconnell, 90, Jamaican Olympic sailor (1964, 1968).
- Kees Klop, 59, Dutch professor of political ethics and former chairman of the NCRV.
- Karloff Lagarde, 79, Mexican lucha libre professional wrestler.
- Doug Maxwell, 80, Canadian curling innovator, cancer.
- Jean Jacques Paradis, 78, Canadian army general, Commander of the Canadian Army.
- James Brian Tait, 90, British World War II pilot.
- Sulev Vahtre, 81, Estonian historian.

== Sources ==
- Liebman, Roy (2000). The Wampas Baby Stars: A Biographical Dictionary, 1922–1934. Jefferson, North Carolina: McFarland. ISBN 0-7864-0756-5.
