= Dombasle =

Dombasle may refer to:

== Places ==
- Dombasle-devant-Darney, French village and commune
- Dombasle-en-Argonne, French commune
- Dombasle-en-Xaintois, French village and commune
- Dombasle-sur-Meurthe, French commune
- Dombasle, former name of the Algerian commune of Hachem

== People ==
- Arielle Dombasle (born 1958), French-American singer and actress
- Charles de Meixmoron de Dombasle (1839-1912), French painter.
- Mathieu de Dombasle (1777-1843), French agronomist.
