= Per Henriksen =

Per Henriksen may refer to:

- Per Henriksen (Danish footballer) (1929–2007)
- Per Henriksen (Norwegian footballer) (1952–2024)
