= Antoine Bertier =

French politician

- Born: 24 September 1761; Nancy, Meurthe-et-Moselle, France
- Died: 4 December 1854 (aged 93); Roville-devant-Bayon, Meurthe-et-Moselle, France
- Occupation(s): Landowner, politician

Antoine Bertier (1761–1854) was a French landowner and politician.

== Early life ==
Antoine Bertier was born on 24 September 1761 in Nancy, France. He was educated in Hamburg, Germany.

== Career ==
Bertier made a fortune in Saint-Domingue. He returned to France in 1789, where he supported the French Revolution. Two years later, in 1791, he lost much of his fortune in the Haitian Revolution.

Bertier became a large landowner in Roville-devant-Bayon, Meurthe. He was the co-founder of the Société centrale d’agriculture in Nancy alongside Mathieu de Dombasle.

Bertier served as a member of the Chamber of Representatives during the Hundred Days from 10 May 1815 to 13 July 1815, representing Meurthe. He became a Knight of the Legion of Honour on 1 May 1838.

== Death ==
Bertier died on 4 December 1854 in Roville-devant-Bayon, France.
