= Académie de Stanislas =

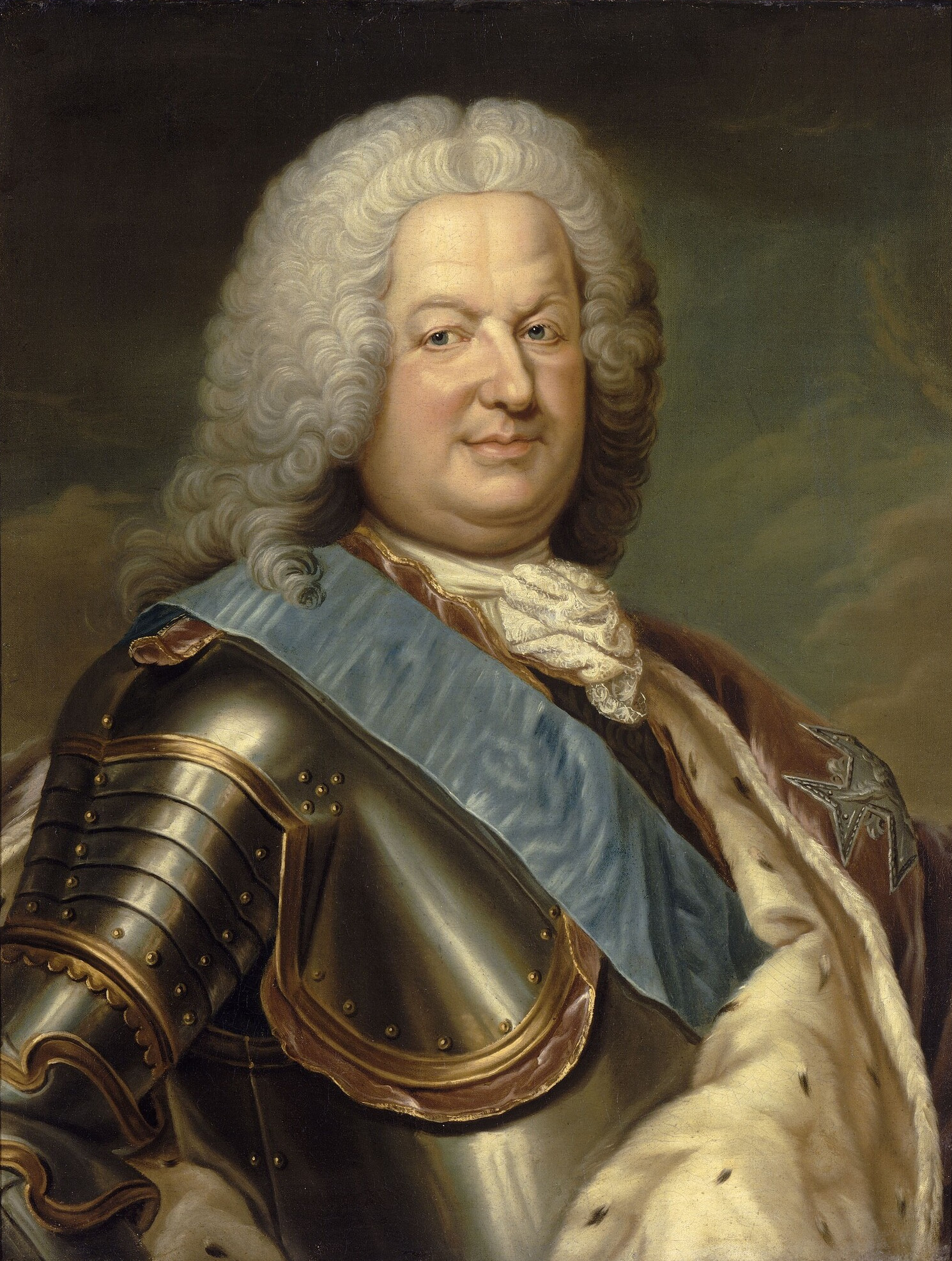
Stanislas Leszczyński, founder of the Academy

The Académie de Stanislas is a learned society founded in Nancy, France on 28 December 1750 by the King of Poland, Duke of Lorraine and Bar, Stanisław Leszczyński, under the name Société Royale des Sciences et Belles-Lettres de Nancy.

It was established in the old Jesuit College, the building which founded the Nancy-Université until its temporary suppression by the Jacobin Convention in 1793, and which has now become the Municipal Library of Nancy.

== Presidents ==
- 13 June 2010 : Christiane Dupuy-Stutzmann
- 1900 : Charles de Meixmoron de Dombasle

=== Past members ===
Charles Berlet, Jacqueline Brumaire, Henri Colin, Charles Coqueley de Chaussepierre, Auguste Digot, Frédéric Eichhoff, Gilles Fabre, Nicolas-Louis François de Neufchâteau, Émile Gallé, André Grandpierre, Maurice Grandpierre, Prosper Guerrier de Dumast, Alain Larcan, Cardinal François-Désiré Mathieu, Montesquieu, René Nicklès, Charles Palissot de Montenoy, Maurice Perrin, Christian Pfister, Joseph de Pommery, Dr. André Remy (22 January 1949), Julien Thoulet (1894), Élise Voïart (first woman member).

=== Honorary member ===
André Rossinot, Mayor of Nancy

== Associated corresponding members ==
=== Present corresponding members ===
Jean-Jacques Aillagon, Christiane Desroches Noblecourt, Jean Favier, Marc Fumaroli, Yves Guéna, Otto von Habsburg-Lorraine, Jean Tulard

=== Past corresponding members ===
Clovis Brunel, Gaspard-Gustave Coriolis, Amiral Émile Guépratte, Charles Hermite, Cardinal Paul-Émile Léger, Joseph Liouville, Pierre Messmer, Dr. André Remy (5/5/1945), Roger Viry-Babel, Józef Andrzej Załuski
