= Stig Johansson =

Stig Johansson may refer to:

- Stig-Göran Johansson (1943–2002), Swedish ice hockey player
- Stig Johansson (linguist) (1939–2010)
- Stig Johansson (water polo) (1924–2007)
- Stig H. Johansson (born 1945), Swedish trotting trainer and former driver
