= Clop =

Clop or Clops may refer to:

- A cross-linguistic onomatopoeic term for the sound of a horse's hooves
- Clop (erotic fan art), a slang term for My Little Pony-themed pornography
- Clop (hat), a traditional hat in Maramureş, Romania
- CLOP, a 2012 computer game made by Bennett Foddy
- Iris Clops, fictional character in the Mattel fashion doll franchise Monster High
- Clop (cyber gang), perpetrators of the MOVEit ransom and other exploits

== See also ==
- Clopper (disambiguation)
- Klop (disambiguation)
- Klopp (disambiguation)
