= La Neuveville-sous-Châtenois =

- Commune
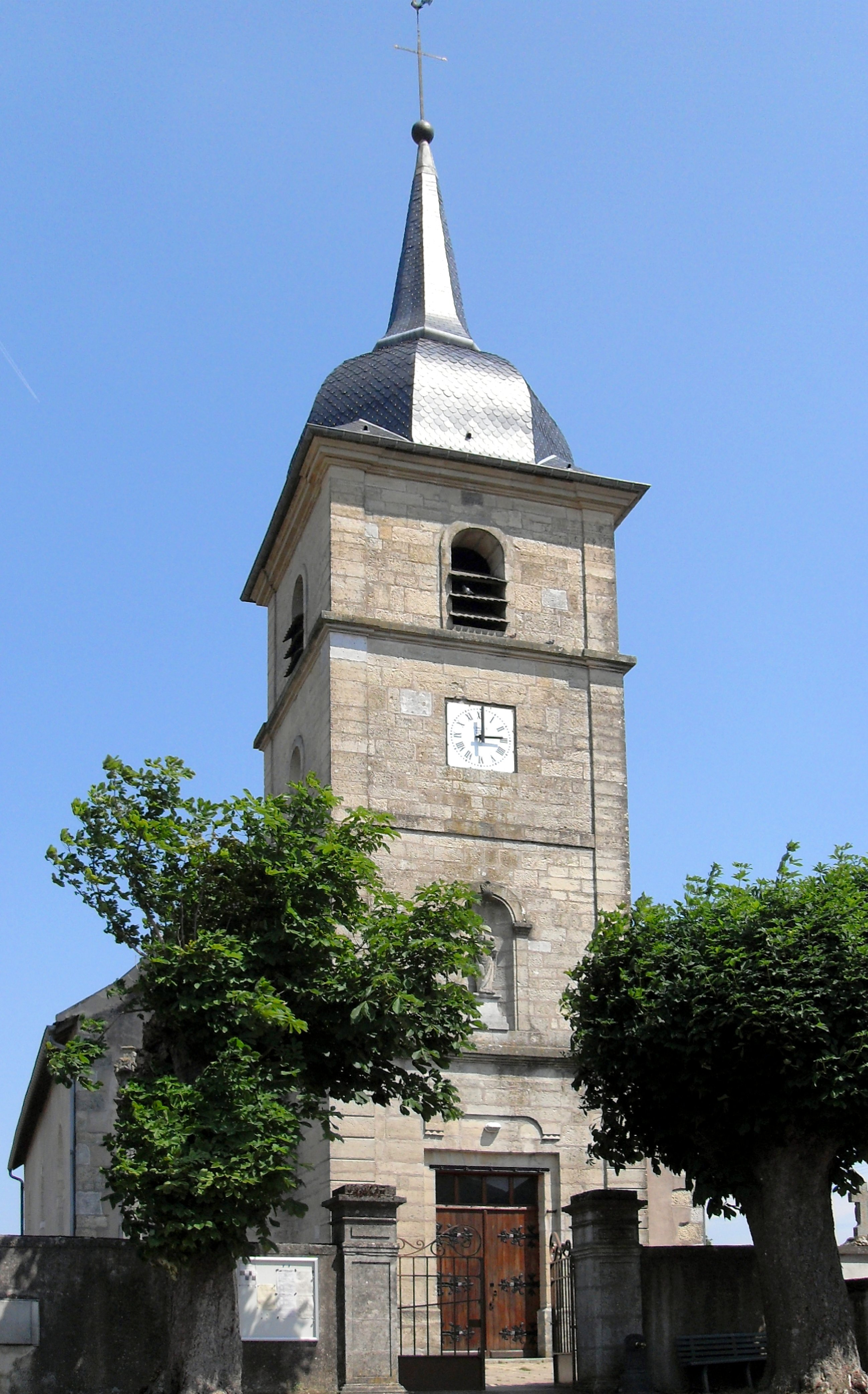
- The church in La Neuveville-sous-Châtenois

- Coat of arms
- Location of La Neuveville-sous-Châtenois
- Location within France Location within Grand Est
- Coordinates: 48°17′36″N 5°52′37″E
- Country: France
- Region: Grand Est
- Department: Vosges
- Arrondissement: Neufchâteau
- Canton: Mirecourt
- Intercommunality: CC Ouest Vosgien

Government
  - Mayor (2020–2026): Nadine Henry
- Area^{1}: 7.41 km^{2} (2.86 sq mi)
- Elevation: 335 m (1,099 ft)
- Highest elevation: 363 m (1,191 ft)
- Lowest elevation: 306 m (1,004 ft)
- Population (2023): 363
  - Density: 49.0/km^{2} (127/sq mi)
- Time zone: UTC+01:00 (CET)
  - Summer (DST): UTC+02:00 (CEST)
- INSEE/Postal code: 88324 /88170
- ^{1} French Land Register data, which excludes lakes, ponds, glaciers > 1 km^{2} (0.386 sq mi or 247 acres) and river estuaries.

La Neuveville-sous-Châtenois (French pronunciation: [la nœv.vil su ʃatnwa], literally La Neuveville under Châtenois) is a commune in the Vosges department in Grand Est in northeastern France.

Inhabitants are called Novavillois.

== Geography ==
Part of the little town is positioned on the road to Châtenois 3 kilometres (2 miles to the west) and Mirecourt, 20 kilometres (12 mi) to the east. The other part is set back from the main road on higher ground overlooking the river Vair. Originally the two parts were two separate hamlets.

La Neuveville is separated by the Vair from the neighbouring village of Houécourt. Two kilometres to the west is the A31 Autoroute, the principal north-south highway crossing Grand Est between Toul and Langres.

== Etymology ==
La Neuveville (Latin Nova Villa: English New Town) was built at one end of the village of "Haut du Mont" after the old village, having been destroyed by Hungarian invaders in the tenth century, was abandoned.

== History ==
Between the tenth and the twelfth century the political situation seems to have become calmer and the impact of epidemics reduced. There is some evidence to indicate rising prosperity and population. According to the nineteenth-century historian Auguste Digot, life became easier in the villages of Lorraine during this time ("une certaine aisance règna dans les villages de Lorraine").

By the middle of the thirteenth century La Neuveville had become sufficiently important to become a parish in its own right, and the size of the church at this time provides one clue as to the population of the parish. The nave was 36 feet long by 22 feet wide, with seating for approximately 120, which gives an inferred population level of perhaps 180 - 200.

Half a century later, in 1306, the Duke of Lorraine and the master of the bailiwick established at "La Nueveville desouz Chastenois" a weekly market, to take place each Tuesday under a covered market place ("sous la Haulle"), as well as an annual trade fair. The markets of that time are still recalled by a street name in the village, la rue de la Halle.

The arrival of the Black Death in 1348 caused a massive decline in population in the ensuing ten or so years, leading to a labour shortage which permanently shifted the balance of economic power between owners of land and providers of manual labour. The Dukes of Lorraine were accordingly conforming to a more widespread pattern in replacing traditional serfdom with a less powerless status for workers. Overall Neuveville appears to have thrived under the changed arrangements, and by the end of the fifteenth century it is thought that the population was on a rising trend which would persist through the middle years of the sixteenth century, with the population peaking at 435 in 1562 according to one estimate, comfortably ahead of the levels seen in the twentieth century.

The first half of the sixteenth century was not an unbroken period of growth however. Digot relates that the century opened with a year that combined famine, as torrential rains destroyed the harvest of 1500, with a particularly deadly outbreak of plague, causing the population to slump. Duke Anthony, the Duke of Lorraine who succeeded his father in 1508 is remembered as a benevolent ruler. The duchy was not spared the plague which returned in 1522 and exercised a savage impact on the population at least until 1531 when, responding to the please of the wretched citizenry, the Duke agreed to a halving of the tax level. Conditions seem to have improved through the 1530s, 1540s and 1550s.

The final four decades of the sixteenth century are known to anglophone historians of western Europe for the French Wars of Religion. Lorraine was not yet part of France, but the duchy was nevertheless badly affected by fighting involving German Protestants from the east and Calvinist forces from closer to home. In 1572 we again find the citizens of La Neuveville appealing for a tax exemption because of acute hunger ("à cause de la disette"). The French wars of religion are generally reckoned to have ended in 1598 with the Edict of Nantes, but by that date, for La Neuveville, other problems were more pressing. Plague returned to Lorraine in 1585 and La Neuveville seems to have been particularly badly affected. A census record in 1593 indicated significant population levels in several surrounding villages without mentioning the village at all. A record from 1596 indicates that La Neuveville itself contained sixteen and a half taxable households which according to a subsequent extrapolation implies a population level of approximately 120, or less than a third of the level from just 34 years earlier.

The population barely recovered during the next hundred years: poor harvests and plague continued to feature especially during the first half of the sixteenth century. Surviving records from the period 1652 to 1661 indicate no more than one or two baptisms per year. The second half of the century saw increasing attention from France and Lorraine was periodically invaded from the west as part of Louis XIV's project to extend France's eastern frontier to the River Rhine. Nevertheless, during a century when plenty of villages in Lorraine simply disappeared. Marriage records from the years 1697 - 1720 indicate several people moving into La Neuveville from neighbouring parishes, and by 1736 the population of the parish seems to have increased sharply. The potato was probably unknown here in 1703 since it did not feature on a schedule of crops subject to the tithe in that year. A legal case of 1745 involving a priest's claim to a tithe payment in nearby Poussay refers to potatatoes in a manner indicating that they were commonplace, so by 1545 potatoes had presumably been cultivated here for some years: that is consistent with population increase because potatoes have a far higher food value per acre than the grains and root crops on which populations in the region depended before the eighteenth century.

The Seven Years' War burdened the village with fresh demands for fighting men and requisitions of supplies, but the growth nevertheless seems to have continued over the century as a whole, with the number of taxable homesteads increasing from 20 in 1703 to 110 in 1788, by which time the total population in the village was probably up to about 480. In 1779 the community decided to build a school house in Church Street (la rue de l'Église), and it is recorded that in 1785 the church itself had become too small by this time so that each Sunday more than 100 people had to remain outside the church during Mass and follow the service from the adjacent graveyard. A new larger church was constructed and consecrated in 1790.

The French Revolution ushered in 25 years of republican and imperial wars which involved military glory and rural depression. A large young men of working and fighting age were called to the service of France: from parish records it is clear that many never returned. The census of 1820 painted a picture of continued depression. La Neuveville was more badly hit than neighbouring parishes because the civic coffers had been emptied by a massively costly legal dispute with the presbytery of Vair which lasted sixteen years. Despite the hardship, the population continued to grow, to hit an all-time peak in 1826 of 578. There was talk of enlarging the church again. In the event, the church was not enlarged which turned out to be prescient since the population now started to decline, and would be down by a third by the end of the century. The population decline of the nineteenth century was a widespread feature of rural France during the nineteenth century. Improvements in transport made villages less vulnerable to localised famines and improved health in the countryside probably improved resistance to disease. However, industrialisation and the growth of commerce in, especially, Alsace and the Paris and Lyon regions enticed the more ambitious country dwellers to move into the cities, drawn by the lure of higher wages and the perception of better prospects. Emigration to Frances's overseas territories and North America also played their part in depleting the population of rural Lorraine. Contemporaries also pointed to a decline in family size, although this was to some extent off-set by a decline in infant mortality in the rural parishes.

It seemed that the dawn of the twentieth century might usher in an end to this decline, with the establishment in 1902 of a glass factory at nearby Gironcourt offering a significant number of jobs at factory level wages at a time when agricultural incomes remained depressed, as they had since the 1870s since when a succession of improvements in transport and preservation techniques had increasingly exposed European agriculture to competition from north and South America. The Gironcourt factory did indeed lead to a resurgence in the population of La Neuveville where formerly abandoned houses were reoccupied by workers moving in from outside the village.

== See also ==
- Communes of the Vosges department
