= Klop =

Klop or KLOP may refer to:

== People with the surname ==
- Kees Klop, Dutch professor of political ethics
- Dirk Klop a Dutch army intelligence officer
- Jan Willem Klop, Dutch mathematician

== Other uses ==
- KLOP, a U.S. radio station
- The Bedbug (Russian: Клоп, romanized: Klop), a 1929 play by Vladimir Mayakovsky
- Mölkky, a Scandinavian lawn game also marketed in English as "Klop"

== See also ==
- Clop (disambiguation)
- Klopp
