= Mathieu de Dombasle =

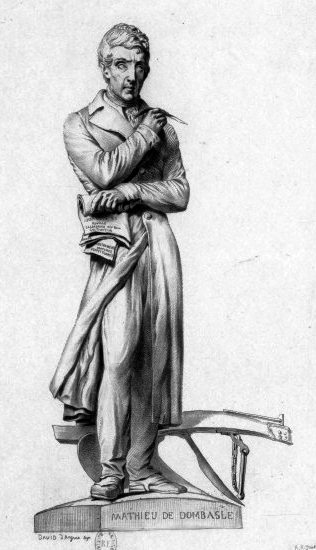
- Mathieu de Dombasle, designed by David d'Angers
- Born: Christophe-Joseph-Alexandre Mathieu de Dombasle; 26 February 1777; Nancy, France
- Died: 27 December 1843 (aged 66); Nancy, France
- Occupation: Agronomist
- Relatives: Charles de Meixmoron de Dombasle (grandson)

Mathieu de Dombasle (1777-1843) was a French agronomist. He was one of the first French farmers to grow beetroots to producer sugar, until he went bankrupt. He invented the Dombasle plough, and he established a model farm in Roville-devant-Bayon. He was the author of many books about agriculture.

== Early life ==
Mathieu de Dombasle was born on 26 February 1777 in Nancy, France. He served in the French Army.

== Career ==
De Dombasle grew beetroots in Monplaisir near Nancy to produce sugar as early as 1809. He was one of the first farmers to grow beetroots for this purpose in France. Five years later, in 1814, he went bankrupt, as the new tariffs made sugarcane more profitable. He subsequently wrote several essays about sugar.

De Dombasle invented the "Dombasle plough," based on the works of Albrecht Thaer. He organized agrarian fairs, where he demonstrated the plough.

De Dombasle was the co-founder of the Société centrale d’agriculture with Antoine Bertier, and he served as its founding president from 1820 to 1825. Meanwhile, the two men established a model farm in Roville-devant-Bayon in 1821-1822.

De Dombasle became an Officer of the Legion of Honour.

== Death and legacy ==
De Dombasle died on 27 December 1843 in Nancy, France. His grandson, Charles de Meixmoron de Dombasle, who became a painter, edited three of his books and published them posthumously in 1861-1862.

== Works ==
- De Dombasle, Mathieu (1814). Observations sur le tarif des douanes proposé à la chambre des députés des départements dans sa séance du 24 septembre 1814 présentées aux deux chambres du corps législatif. Nancy: Imprimerie de Guivard. OCLC 461368538.
- De Dombasle, Mathieu (1820). Instruction théorique et pratique sur la fabrication des eaux-de-vie de grains et de pommes de terre. Paris: Chez Madame Huzard. OCLC 20817137.
- De Dombasle, Mathieu (1829). Des impôts dans leurs rapports avec la production agricole. Paris: Huzard. OCLC 776903151.
- De Dombasle, Mathieu (1830). Calendrier du bon cultivateur, ou Manuel de l'agriculteur praticien. Paris: Madame Huzard. OCLC 551692353.
- De Dombasle, Mathieu (1830). Notice sur l'araire ou charrue simple. Nancy: Imprimerie de Vve Raybois. OCLC 457449566.
- De Dombasle, Mathieu (1832). Annales agricoles de Roville ou Mélanges d'agriculture, d'économie rurale, et de législation agricole. Paris: Huzard. OCLC 680497038.
- De Dombasle, Mathieu (1834). Des intérêts respectifs du midi et du Nord de la France dans les questions de douanes; de l'importance relative de l'industrie intérieure et du commerce extérieur; des intérêts spéciaux du commerce et du système de protection pour l'intérêt du pays. Paris: Huzard. OCLC 457449476.
- De Dombasle, Mathieu (1834). Des droits d'entrée sur les laines et sur les bestiaux : avec des considérations sur les effets des droits de protection en général et sur la situation particulière de l'agriculture française, relativement à l'industrie des troupeaux. Paris: Huzard. OCLC 65279931.
- De Dombasle, Mathieu (1835). De l'avenir industriel de la France : un rayon de bon sens sur quelques grandes questions d'économie politique. Paris: Huzard. OCLC 65307620.
- De Dombasle, Mathieu (1835). Des chemins vicinaux et du régime des bacs. Nouvelles observations. Nancy: Haener. OCLC 311666323.
- De Dombasle, Mathieu (1836). Du sucre indigène, de la situation actuelle de cette industrie en France, de son avenir, et du droit dont on propose de la charger. Paris: Huzard. OCLC 18940539.
- De Dombasle, Mathieu (1838). De l'avenir de l'Algérie. Paris: Dufart. OCLC 33328788.
- De Dombasle, Mathieu (1838). Fabrication simple et peu dispendieuse du sucre indigène. Paris: Huzard. OCLC 78246831.
- De Dombasle, Mathieu (1841). Sucre indigène. Lettre à un fabricant sur le procédé de macération. Nancy: Imprimerie de A. Paullet. OCLC 30604807.
- De Dombasle, Mathieu (1841). La question des bestiaux considérée sous ses divers points de vue. Paris: Bouchard-Huzard. OCLC 758465487.
- De Dombasle, Mathieu (1843). La Question des sucres en 1843. Paris: Mme Bouchard-Huzard. OCLC 758338118.
- De Dombasle, Mathieu (1843). Le sucre indigène dans ses rapports avec les progrès de l'agriculture. Paris: Mme Bouchard-Huzard. OCLC 457449753.
- De Dombasle, Mathieu (1861). De Meixmoron de Dombasle, Charles (ed.). Traité d'agriculture. / 1ère partie, Economie générale. Paris: Bouchard-Huzard. OCLC 493910260.
- De Dombasle, Mathieu (1862). De Meixmoron de Dombasle, Charles (ed.). Traité d'agriculture. / 2e partie, Pratique agricole. Paris: Bouchard-Huzard. OCLC 493910507.
- De Dombasle, Mathieu (1862). De Meixmoron de Dombasle, Charles (ed.). Traité d'agriculture. / 3e partie, Bétail. Paris: Bouchard-Huzard. OCLC 493910621.
