= Frédéric Eichhoff =

French linguist and philologist (1799–1875)

Frédéric Gustave Eichhoff (17 August 1799, in Le Havre – 10 May 1875, in Paris) was a French linguist and philologist.

He studied at Paris, receiving his doctorate in 1826 with a thesis on Hesiod. In 1837–38, he worked as a substitute for Claude Fauriel at the Sorbonne, and in 1842 was appointed professor of foreign languages at the Faculty of Letters in Lyon. From 1855 onward, he served as inspector-general for public instruction.

He was a member of the Académie de Stanislas and a correspondent member of the Académie des Inscriptions et Belles-Lettres (1847–75).

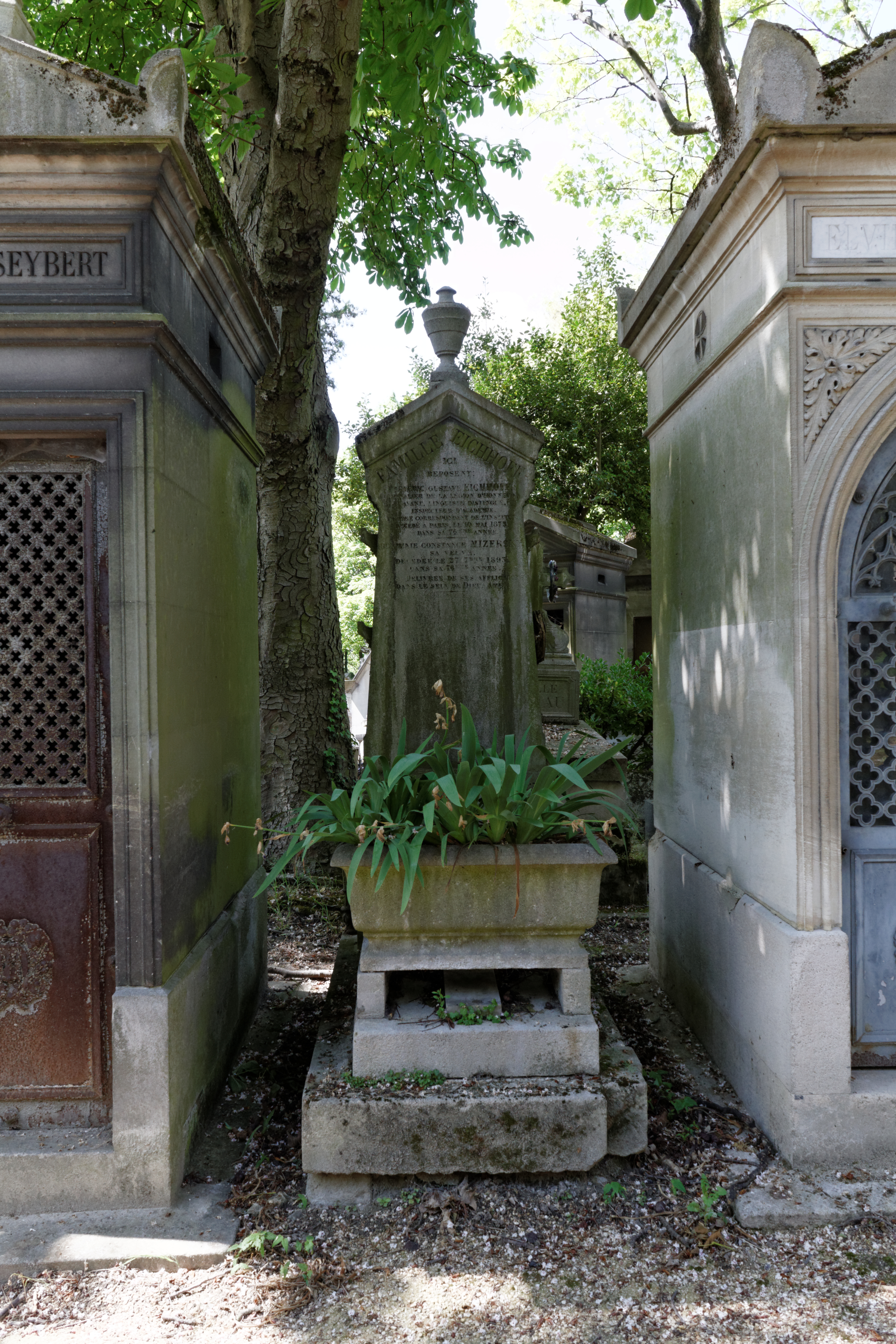
Tomb of Eichhoff at the Père-Lachaise, Division 53

== Selected works ==
- Études grecques sur Virgile, 1825 – Greek studies on Virgil.
- Parallele des langues de l'Europe et de l'Inde, 1836 – Language parallels of Europe and India.
- Histoire de la langue et de la littérature des Slaves, Russes, Serbes, Bohèmes, Polonais et Lettons, 1839 – History of the languages and of the literature of Slavs, Russians, Serbs, Bohemians, Poles and Letts.
- Dictionnaire étymologique des racines allemandes, 1840 – Etymological dictionary of German roots.
- Tableau de la littérature du nord au moyen âge en Allemagne et en Angleterre, en Scandinavie et en Slavonie, 1853 – Table of literature regarding the Middle Ages in Germany, England, Scandinavia and Slavonia.
- Poesie heroique des Indiens comparee a l'epopee grecque et romaine, 1860 – Heroic poetry of the Indians compared to the Greek and Roman epic.
- Grammaire générale Indo-Européenne, 1867 – Indo-European general grammar.
- Rig-véda; ou, Livre des hymnes – Rigveda; or, Book of hymns.
