= Roger Viry-Babel =

French film actor, director and screenwriter

Roger Viry-Babel

Roger Viry-Babel (1945 in Mirecourt, Vosges – 2006), saw himself as an entertainer, academic and French filmmaker. Pioneer of audiovisual teaching at the University of Nancy II and at its European film institute (IECA), he spent his life bringing together his love of teaching, cinema and the history of his region (Lorraine).

== Early life ==
Roger Viry-Babel was born on 19 January 1945 in Mirecourt in the French Vosges. His childhood was spent in Nancy in the University residences where his adoptive father worked as director. He attended the Lycée Henri-Poincaré where he obtained his baccalaureate. He then studied French literature where he focused on Albert Camus. During his university studies, in 1965, he became Vice-president of the student paper "L'Echo des Lettres" where he published his first film reviews. In 1969, he married Francoise Charmoillaux and their marriage brought four children: Jean, Gérard, Francois and Anne.

== Career ==
In 1970, Viry-Babel became assistant lecturer in French literature at the UER Lettre campus of the Université de Nancy II. In this setting, under the guidance of Guy Borelli, he organised the first colloquium on teaching and cinema (Nancy 1973) and undertook a research paper examining Jean Renoir’s The Grand Illusion (La Grande illusion).

He was mentored in his cinematographic career by screenwriter Charles Spaak and film director Michel Guillet.

This led to his being hired as director of Radio France Nancy (between 1983 and 1985). During his tenure he handed the airways to several young local authors including Lefred-Thouron and Francis Kuntz. During this time, alongside Noël Nel, he established university degrees in film (Licence (BA) followed by a DEA (MA)). After a thesis entitled “The Women of Jean Renoir” (Les femmes chez Jean Renoir) and a book entitled “Jean Renoir, the game and the rules” (Jean Renoir, le jeu et la règle) published by Denoël, he took a position as university professor in 1987.

In 1982, at 42, Viry-Babel ran unsuccessfully as local councillor for the socialist party in Vandoeuvre-lès-Nancy.

In 1992 he became deputy grand master of the French Free Masonry (Grand Orient de France).

In 1993, he was awarded the Prix de l'Académie des Beaux-Arts – for the book written in partnership with Daniel Corinaud entitled "Travelling du rail" (published by Denoël). He then became associate correspondent for the Académie de Stanislas.

In 1994, taking advantage of the University 2000 action plan and in partnership with Noël Nel et Eric Schmulevitch, Viry-Babel helped establish the Université de Nancy II’s Institut Européen du Cinéma et de l'Audiovisuel.

Viry-Babel produced numerous television programmes including the show “Continentals” in 1995 on FR3 and the show “Je me souviens (I remember) in 1996. In 1996 he co-founded “Ere productions” (Nancy).

In 2003, he was awarded the Jacques Rosenberg Award (Auschwitz Foundation) for the film directed in partnership with Régis Latouche. “Francais pour 42 sous”. His career was honoured in 2005 through his award of the title Chevalier des Arts et Lettres.

He died in Nancy on 15 May 2006.

== Filmography summary (actor) ==
Roger Viry-Babel dans "Maigret se trompe".
The voter in "L'urne noire" (Alain Lithaud, 1971)
The cousin in "Confessions d'un enfant de choeur" (Jean L'Hôte, TV, 1976)
The officer in "Louise Michel, la Vierge Rouge" (Michel Guillet, TV, 1978)
The orderly in "Le Mécréant" (Jean L'Hôte, TV, 1981)
Mr. Mansuy in "Maigret se trompe" (Stéphane Bertin, TV, 1981)
"Moi" in "Le neveu de Rameau" alongside Fabrice Colombero (2004)
The journalist in "Le temps de la désobéissance" (Patrick Volson, TV, 2006)

== Filmography summary (Screenwriter TV) ==
"Le bonjour d'Ernest" (Michel Guillet, 1976)
"Les Z'ados" (Jean-Luc Mage, 1978)
"Propos libertins" (Michel Guillet, 1978)
"Procès à Grandville" (Michel Guillet, 1981)

== Filmography summary (director MM and LM TV) ==
"La mort du téméraire" (fiction with Roger Hanin, 1977, 26 mn, FR3)
Co-dir with Michel Guillet : "Louise Michel, la Vierge Rouge" (fiction documentary with Monique Chaumette, 1978, 26 mn, FR3)
"Le violon du diable" (fiction with Ivry Gitlis, 1980, 45 mn, FR3)
Co-dir with Jean-Marie Deconinck : "Robert Schuman" (1984, 104 mn, RTBF)
Co-dir with Patrick Martin : "Ceux des Eparges" (1992, 30 mn, France 3)
"L'Amérique de Jean Baudrillard" (1990, 13 mn, France 3)
"De ce lieu, de ce jour" (1992, 26 mn, France 3)
"Jacques Callot" (sur un scénario de Georges Sadoul, 1992, 26 mn, France 3)
"La dynastie Sadoul" (1992, 26 mn, France 3)
"La rue Saint-Jean" (1992, 13 mn, France 3, d'après un texte de Jean L'Hôte)
"Tabac sur celluloïd" (1993, 20 mn, France 3)
"Retour à Longwy" (1993, 13 mn, France 3)
"Il était une fois dans l'Est" (1995, 5 x 26 mn, France 3)
"Les comédiens" (1995, 26 mn, France 3)
"Les Naufragés du service 13" (1992, 90 minutes)
"Paul Verlaine" (1999, 26 mn, France 3)
"L'héritage du charbon" (2000, 26 mn, France 3)
"Mémoires de Franche-Comté" (2000, 52 mn, éditions Montparnasse)
Co-dir with Régis Latouche : "Français pour 42 sous" (2000, 104 mn, France 3)
Co-dir with Régis Latouche : "Le pays aux 800 000 Présidents" (2001, 104 mn, France 3)
"La route des grandes gueules" (2001, 52 mn, France 3)
"Retour à Mirecourt" (2002, 20 mn, France 3)
"Poinca, avec le temps..." (2004, 100 mn, IECA)
Co-dir with Nathalie Conq and André Villeroy : "Sweet Lorraine, suite lorraine (September 1944)" (2004, 100 mn, IECA).
Co-dir with Nathalie Conq : "Qui étaient les 7 flics de Nancy?" (2006, 34 mn)
