= Charles de Meixmoron de Dombasle =

French painter

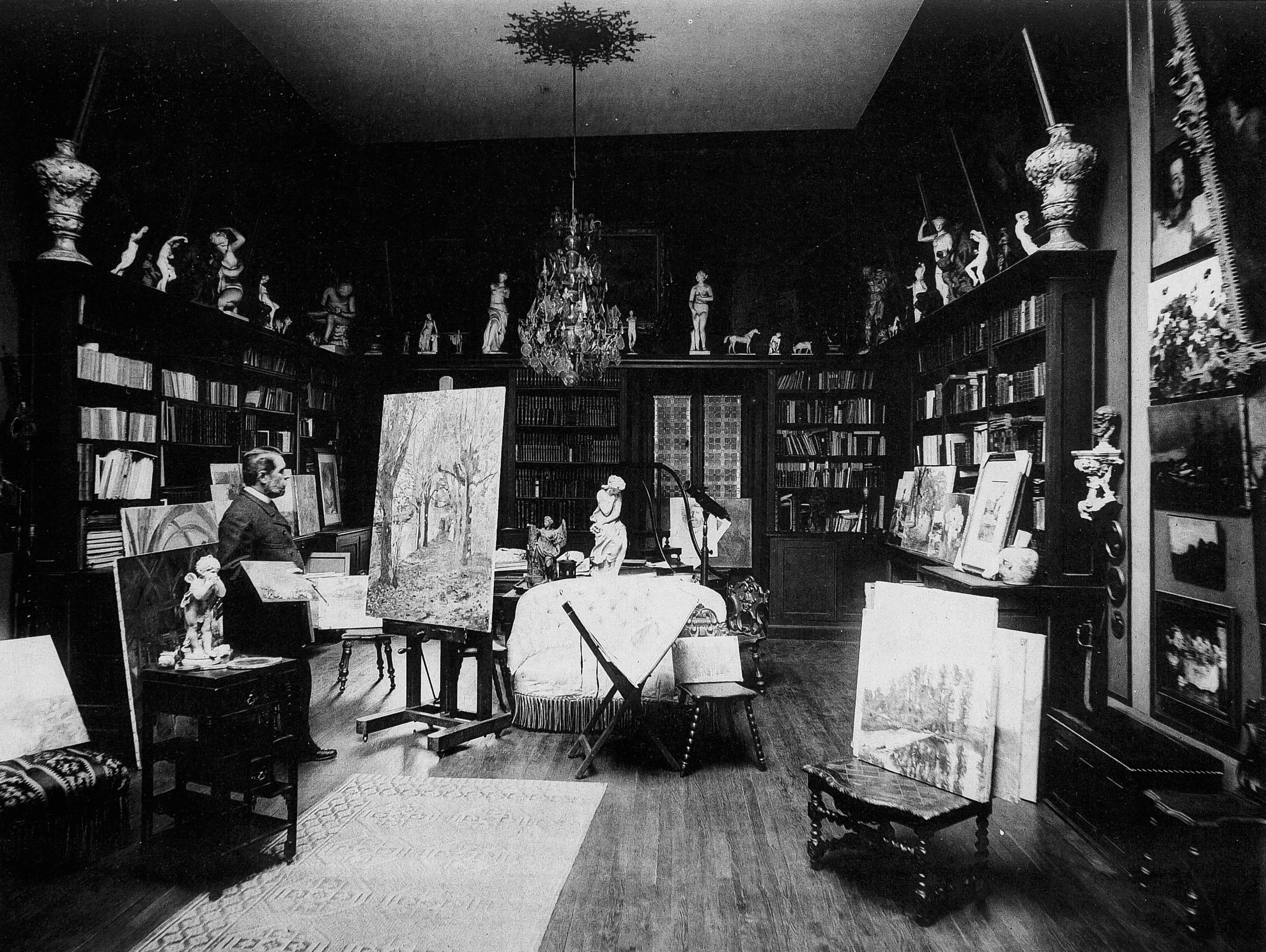
- Born: Léon Charles Bénigme Vaillant de Meixmoron Mathieu de Dombasle; November 10, 1839; Roville-devant-Bayon, Meurthe-et-Moselle, France
- Died: July 20, 1912 (aged 72); Diénay, Côte-d'Or, France
- Occupations: Businessman, painter
- Relatives: Mathieu de Dombasle (paternal grandfather)

Charles de Meixmoron de Dombasle (1839-1912) was a French heir and painter. He inherited a ploughing implement factory from his paternal grandfather, Mathieu de Dombasle, in Nancy. He became a member of the Académie de Stanislas in 1887, and served as its president in 1900.

== Biography ==
Charles de Meixmoron de Dombasle is the son of Jean-Baptiste Vaillant de Meixmoron and Marie-Charlotte de Dombasle, daughter of Mathieu de Dombasle, known for his numerous writings on agronomy and in particular for his contributions to the plow. In 1839, he obtained permission to add the matronymic “de Dombasle” to his surname.

Enrolled at the private Catholic institution of La Malgrange in Nancy, France from 1850 to 1857, Charles de Meixmoron received an excellent education. In 1856, he distinguished himself by winning the prize for excellence in the science section: he was top of his class in French speech, Latin translation, and graphic design (named six times).

Encouraged to pursue an artistic career by his father, himself an art lover, Jean-Baptiste-Camille Corot de Meixmoron honed his drawing skills in the studio of Louis Leborne, a painter in the tradition of Corot who was director of the École des Beaux-Arts in Nancy.

In 1860, upon the death of his father, he took over the reins of the agricultural equipment factory created by his grandfather Mathieu and continued by his father. During this period, he wrote texts on agriculture. In 1861, he published posthumously, in his grandfather's name, Traité d'agriculture (Treatise on Agriculture) and Le calendrier du bon cultivateur (The Good Farmer's Calendar) et Le calendrier du bon cultivateur.

For Meixmoron, painting was merely a hobby, but this did not prevent him from submitting numerous paintings to exhibitions organized by the Lorraine Society of Friends of the Arts from 1860 onwards. He served as president of the society from 1868 to 1892. He exhibited Forêts près Martinville (Forests near Martinville) in Paris at the 1866 Salon. In 1890, he participated in the first Salon of the Société Nationale des Beaux-Arts (National Society of Fine Arts) at the Champ-de-Mars with five paintings and a pastel, and in 1900 he was featured at the Exposition Universelle (1900).
