= Clopper =

Clopper may refer to:

- Clop (erotic fan art), erotic fan art of the TV show My Little Pony
- Hoof, the toe of ungulates
- Clopper-Pearson interval, in statistics
- Clopper Lake, Seneca Creek State Park, Maryland, US
- Clopper Road, a name for portions of Maryland Route 117, in the United States

== See also ==
- Clop (disambiguation)
- Iris Clops, character in the TV show Monster High
- Ol' Clip-Clop, a book by Patricia McKissack
- Spy Clops, a Lego theme
