= Prosper Guerrier de Dumast =

French historian and archaeologist

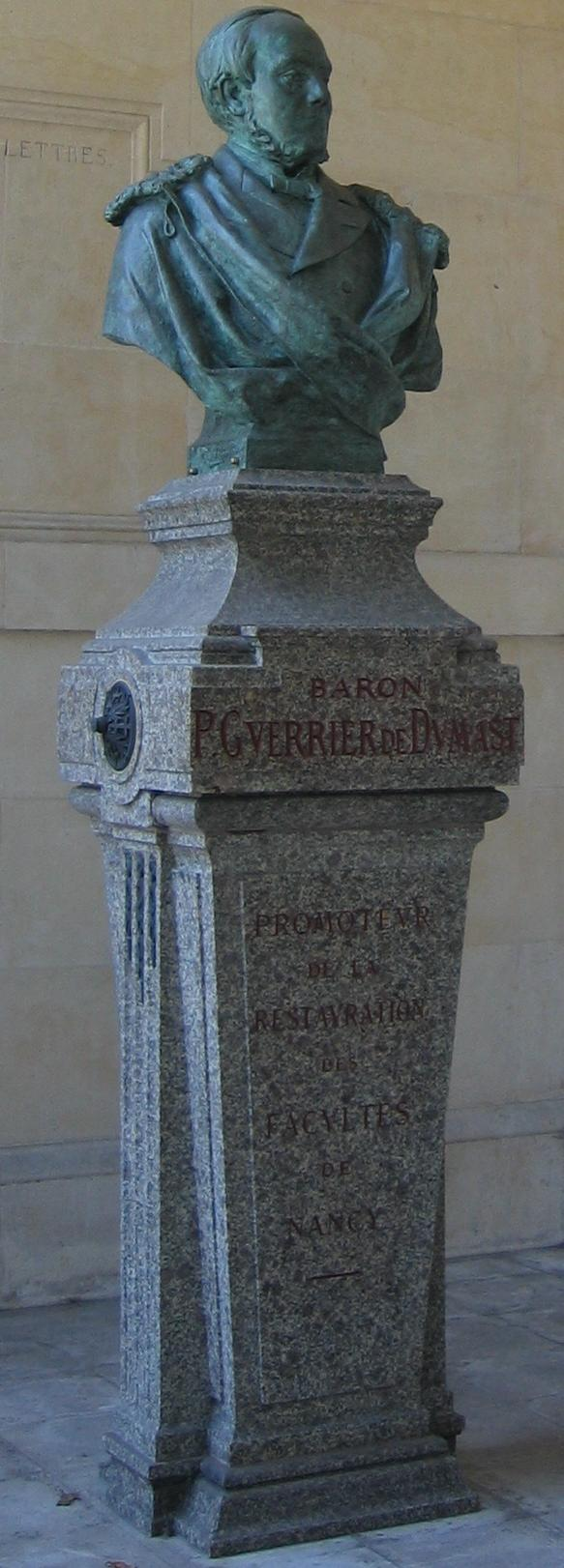
Prosper Guerrier de Dumast, promoteur de la restauration des facultés de Nancy, bust located at the entrance of the faculty of law in Nancy.

Auguste-Prosper-François, baron Guerrier de Dumast (26 February 1796, Nancy – 26 January 1883, Nancy) was a figure of French Liberal Catholicism and a defender of the city of Nancy (lotharingism).

A member of the Académie de Stanislas, he was also a chevalier of the Order of Charles III and a member of the Société Asiatique.

== Works ==
- 1818–1821: Discours maçonniques des années.
- 1820: La Maçonnerie.
- 1821–1862: Un mot sur les langues de l'Orient.
- 1832–1835: Le pour et le contre sur la résurrection des provinces.
- 1850: Philosophie de l'histoire de Lorraine.
- 1857: Fleurs de l'Inde.
- 1866: Les Initiatives lorraines.
- 1868: Morts comparées de la Pologne et de la Lorraine.
- 1874: Couronne poétique de la Lorraine.

== Sources ==
- Jean-François Thull (2007). La contribution de Prosper Guerrier de Dumast à l'émergence du lotharingisme à Nancy. Vol. 88. Le Pays lorrain. pp. 173–178..
- Pierre Barral, « L'auguste et chère dynastie vue par Guerrier de Dumast », in Jean-Paul Bled (dir.), Eugène Faucher (dir.), René Taveneaux (dir.), Les Habsbourg et la Lorraine, actes du colloque du 22-24 mai 1987 organisé par les universités de Nancy-II and Strasbourg-III, Nancy, Presses universitaires de Nancy, coll. Diagonales, 1988, 263 p. (ISBN 2-86480-147-7), p.229-236.
- Lucien Adam, Le baron Guerrier de Dumast, Nancy, G. Crépin-Leblond, 1883, 60 p.
