= Diane Lewis (journalist) =

American journalist

Diane E. Lewis (March 26, 1953 – August 14, 2007) was an American journalist and writer. Lewis worked as a reporter for the Boston Globe for 26 years. She reported extensively on labor and workers' rights during her last 15 years with the Boston Globe.

== Early life ==
Diane Lewis grew up in East Orange, New Jersey. She was the daughter of Jamaican immigrants. Her father died when she was very young and she was raised by her single mother.

Lewis obtained a bachelor's degree in English literature from Case Western University in 1975. She worked for several Cleveland area publications following her graduation. She also worked as a publicist for the Cleveland Public Library.

Lewis obtained a fellowship to attend the University of California at Berkeley. Lewis worked for the Telegram & Gazette in Worcester, Massachusetts, for three years after leaving UC Berkeley, before being hired by the Boston Globe.

== Boston Globe ==
Diane Lewis covered a variety of beats during her early years at the Boston Globe. The topics she reported on ranged from mental health issues to the legal system.

Lewis focused mainly on labor issues during her last 15 years at the newspaper. She reported on the labor movement, workers' rights and immigrant exploitation. Her stories could be critical of both a company's owners and management, as well as the labor unions. She was described by one Boston Globe editor as having an eye for the "underdog". She often reported specifically on poor working conditions of workers, including issues related to immigrants, those earning low incomes, and workers with bad bosses.

== Death ==
Diane Lewis was diagnosed with cancer in 2005. She died on August 14, 2007, at Montefiore Medical Center in the Bronx, New York. Lewis was 54 years old. A memorial service was held in Roxbury, Massachusetts.

Lewis was a Boston resident. She had one daughter, Karina Sharif, who attends the Pratt Institute.
