= Charles Palissot de Montenoy =

French playwright

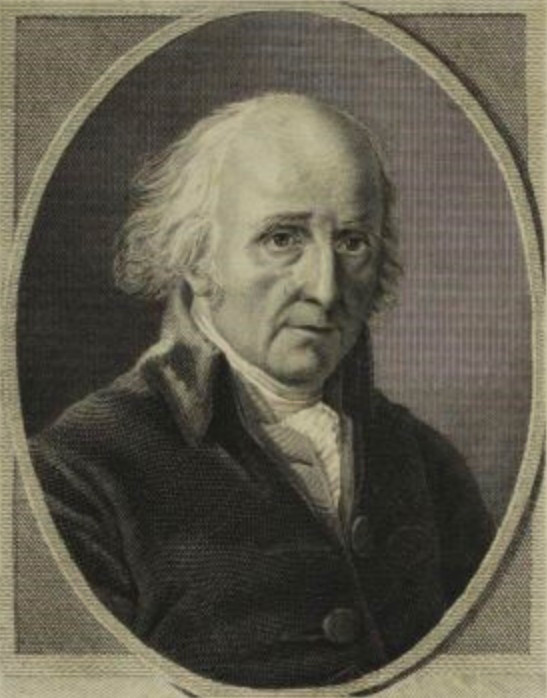
- (Musée de la Révolution française)
- Born: 3 January 1730; Nancy, duchy of Lorraine
- Died: 15 June 1814 (aged 84); Paris, France
- Occupation: Playwright

Charles Palissot de Montenoy (French: [ʃaʁl paliso də mɔ̃tənwa]; 3 January 1730 – 15 June 1814) was an 18th-century French playwright, admirer and disciple of Voltaire and Antoine de Rivarol. Paradoxically, he was often denounced as a Counter-Enlightenment opponent to the parti philosophique, especially for his criticism of Diderot and the Encyclopédistes. He is the author of the comedy, Les Philosophes, which was a huge success and caused a scandal in 1760.

== Works ==
Palissot's works were collected in three more or less complete editions: one published in Liege in 1777 at Plomteux, 6 vol. in-8° to which a seventh volume was added in 1779 with the publication of the second edition; the third by the printingpress of Monsieur, in 1788, 4 volumes in-8°; the last one published under the eyes of the author, in Paris, Chez Collin 1809, 6 volumes. in-8°.

The chronological list below provides links to the Gallica basis of the Bibliothèque Nationale de France when the book is available in this database:

- 1748: Pharaon, tragedy in 5 acts and in verse, non performed.
- 1751: Zarès, tragedy in 5 acts and in verse, premiered at the Comédie-Française, 3 June (later renamed Ninus second)
- 1753–1756: Histoire des rois de Rome.
- 1754: Les Tuteurs, comedy in 2 acts and in verse, premiered at the Comédie-Française, 5 August.
- 1755: Le Cercle ou Les Originaux, comedy, premiered in the nouveau théâtre de Nancy, 26 November
- 1757: Petites lettres sur de grands philosophes.
- 1758: Le Barbier de Bagdad, comedy presented in the author's theatre in Argenteuil.
- 1760: Les Philosophe, comedy in 3 acts and in verse, premiered at the Comédie-Française, 2 May.
- 1762: Les Nouveaux Ménechmes, comedy in 5 acts in verse, (other titles: Le Rival par ressemblance; Clerval et Cléon; Les Méprises)
- 1764: La Dunciade française ou la Guerre des sots, satirical poem in three chants (later extended to 10 chants).
- 1770: Le Satirique ou l'Homme dangereux, comedy in 3 acts and in verse, given on the author's theatre in Argenteuil.
- 1775: Les Courtisanes ou l'École des mœurs, comedy in 3 acts and in verse.
- 1778: Éloge de Voltaire.
- 1771: Mémoires pour servir à l’histoire de la littérature depuis François Ier jusqu'à nos jours, 2 vol. (numerous reprints: 1775, 1803...)
- 1791: Questions importantes sur quelques opinions religieuses, (reprints: 1793, 1797)
- 1806: Le Génie de Voltaire apprécié dans tous ses ouvrages.

== Bibliography ==
- D. Delafarge, La Vie et l’œuvre de Palissot, Paris, 1912
- C. Duckworth, "Voltaire's L'Écossaise and Palissot's Les Philosophes : A strategic battle in a major war", Studies on Voltaire and the 18th century, Banbury (Oxfordshire), tome LXXXVII, 1972
- Hilde H. Freud, "Palissot and “Les Philosophes”", Diderot Studies, Geneva, vol IX, 1967
- H. Guénot, "Palissot, un ennemi de Diderot et des Philosophes", in Recherches sur Diderot et sur l'Encyclopédie, vol. 1, 1986
- E. Jovy, Palissot et Gobet, 1928
- G. Saintville, "Lettres de jeunesse de Palissot", in Mélanges Huguet, 1940, (p. 336–347)
- Jacques Truchet, Notice on Les Philosophes, in Théâtre du XVIIIe, Paris, Gallimard, Bibliothèque de la Pléiade, 1974, book II, (p. 1383–1395)
- C.F. Zeer, "Palissot and Voltaire", Modern Language Quarterly, December 1949.
- Hervé Guénot: "Charles Palissot de Montenoy (1730–1814)", in: Dictionnaire des journalistes (1600–1789).
