= Wilfried Kemmer =

German footballer

Personal information
- Date of birth: 20 November 1943
- Date of death: 21 August 2007 (aged 63)

Senior career*
Years	Team	Apps	(Gls)
1962–1966	VfL Wolfsburg		
1966–1967	VfB Lübeck		
1967–1977	VfL Wolfsburg		

Managerial career
- 1979–1983: VfL Wolfsburg
- * Club domestic league appearances and goals

Wilfried Kemmer (20 November 1943 – 21 August 2007) was a German football midfielder and later manager.
