= Lucien Jarraud =

Canadian radio host

Lucien "Frenchie" Jarraud (September 7, 1922 – August 17, 2007) was a Quebec radio host for nearly 50 years. He was best known as being the host that started the open talk radio format in Quebec in the 1950s.

Born in Paris, France, Jarraud fought in 1939 with the French Army World War II in Belgium at the age of 17. He was decorated of the Croix de Guerre after he was captured by troops of Nazi Germany but later narrowly escaped the Germans. Outside of his military service, Jarraud worked for a circus as an acrobat and was also a manager for several French artists. In 1948, he decided to move to Canada. Jarraud was then interested in the media department. He then began to work as a radio host at Montreal station CJMS in 1955 and started the talk radio format which was a major development in Quebec radio media history. With CJMS, he was the host of a morning show during his stint at CJMS. He then moved to CKVL for 15 years before doing stints for CKLM and CHRS. In his final years he could be heard on the new CJMS.

Jarraud made a brief attempt in politics when he was a Progressive Conservative Candidate in the 1974 federal elections in the riding of St. Henri. He finished second behind Liberal candidate Gerard Loiselle as the Liberal Party won a majority government under Pierre Elliott Trudeau.

Jarraud was also known a negotiator and credited for saving several people from committing suicide, particularly people that attempted to jump off Montreal's Jacques-Cartier Bridge which was known as the bridge with the second highest suicidal rate in the world. Jarraud had used his experience at the circus for climbing the superstructure of the bridge to prevent people from jumping into the Saint Lawrence River below. It was Jarraud that influenced other people such as Claude Poirier to become a negotiator and crime reporter in the 1960s and 1970s.

In addition to his career as radio host, he also played in several television shows.

Jarraud died in Paris on August 17, 2007, at the age of 84 just over a month after suffering from respiratory and heart problems.
