= Clarence Tex Walker =

American singer

Clarence "Tex" Walker
- Born: January 24, 1946; Winston-Salem, North Carolina, United States
- Died: August 8, 2007 (aged 61) Woodstock, Oxfordshire, England
- Genres: Rhythm and blues

Clarence "Tex" Walker (January 24, 1946 – August 8, 2007) was an American rhythm and blues musician, who was the lead singer with Bill Pinkney's Original Drifters and The Coasters. After touring Europe with Big Joe Turner, Walker appeared at the Bishopstock Blues Festival, before forming his own group in London, The Walker Street Blues Band, and recording Blues in Black, which was released to critical acclaim in Britain. Walker made the UK his home and performed numerous gigs and concerts there. In his later years he lived in Oxford, England. Walker died of a heart attack on August 8, 2007. He had the attack in the King's Arms Hotel at Woodstock, Oxfordshire, and died four days later.

== A rock and roll original ==
Walker's family were talented and musically gifted. As a child he became a leading voice in the gospel choir of his hometown congregation in Winston-Salem, North Carolina. In his teens, he joined his brother's group and appeared with Wilson Pickett.

== Vietnam to the Original Drifters ==
During the 1960s, Walker served in Vietnam. When he returned to the United States, he was invited to join Bill Pinkney's group, the Original Drifters as the lead vocalist.

Walker fronted the group on several appearances on Jerry Lewis' Telethon. In Las Vegas, Walker appeared with the Drifters who worked in the same venues with Sammy Davis Jr., Frank Sinatra, Dean Martin, Tony Bennett and many major rock, blues and jazz artists including: The Rolling Stones; The Beatles; B.B. King; Aretha Franklin; Louis Armstrong; Count Basie; Herbie Hancock; Miles Davis; Ray Charles and Nat King Cole.

== The Coasters ==
After several major tours and three guest appearances on The Ed Sullivan Show, Clarence was invited to front The Coasters. As the lead singer, he fronted the group's appearances in America, the Middle East and Europe on several successful sell out tours.

== Touring Europe and recording with Big Joe Turner ==
In the late 1990s, Walker supported B.B King with Big Joe Turner at the Royal Albert Hall. Soon thereafter, Walker made his home in Great Britain. Big Joe Turner invited Walker to tour with his group in Europe. While touring with Big Joe Turner, Walker sang the lead vocals on two of Turner's albums: Big Joe Turner's Memphis Blues Caravan and French Connection.

== Bishopstock and the Walker Street Blues Band ==
After appearing at Bishopstock, Walker released Blues in Black, to critical acclaim and was hailed in Blueprint, a British blues journal. In Britain, Walker headlined many venues including the Jazz Cafe. Walker lived in Winston-Salem where he was planning a European tour with backup singers Sian Pugh and Chloe Quinn before his death.
