= Gilles Fabre =

French painter

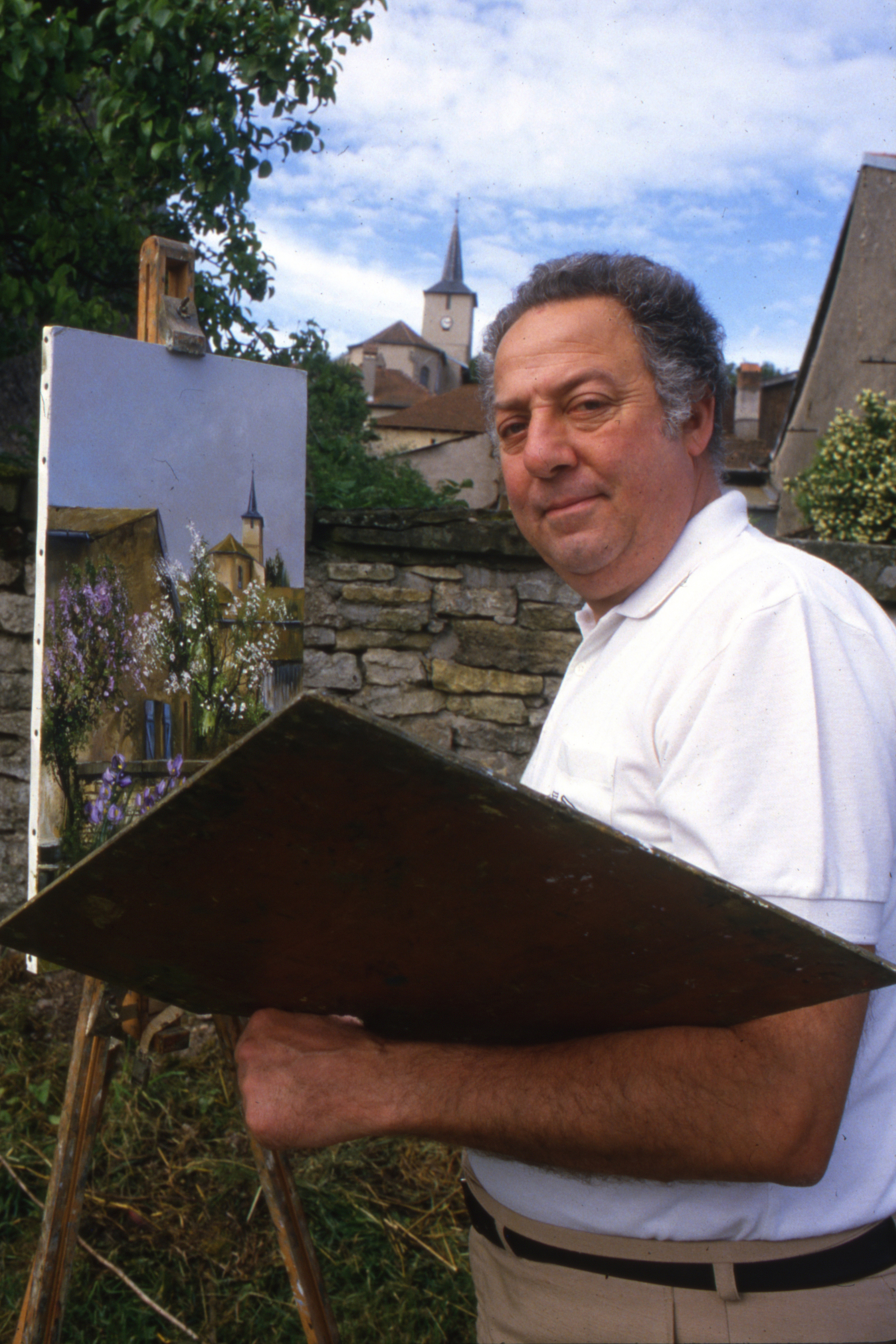

Gilles Fabre (October 7, 1933 – August 19, 2007) was a French painter.

== Biography ==
Gilles Fabre was born on October 7, 1933, in Blâmont, France. In 1950, he passed the entrance examination at the National School of Art and Design of Nancy. He then took a course at the National School of Decorative Arts in Paris, before starting a career in advertising. In November 1966, he had his first solo exhibition at Maison des jeunes et de la Culture in Saint-Cloud. From 1993, he was member of Académie de Stanislas and became its president in 1999. He received Ordre des Arts et des Lettres in 1990. Fabre died on August 19, 2007, in Repaix, France.
