= Clifton Neita =

Jamaican journalist and editor

Clifton Neita (25 February 1915 – 13 August 2007) was a Jamaican journalist and managing editor of the Jamaica Gleaner from 1954 to 1979.

== Early life ==
Clifton Neita was born on 25 February 1915 in Ulster Spring, Trelawny Parish, Jamaica. His parents were Cecil Alexander and Florence Albertha Neita. Neita completed his early education at the Methodist School in Ulster Spring before enrolling at Cornwall College.

== Career ==
Neita worked as an attorney and journalist before becoming managing editor of the Jamaica Gleaner in 1954. Neita also became a legal adviser for the larger Gleaner Company and was known for his ability to separate potential libel from stories pertaining to the public interest. He also worked as an editorial adviser for two of the Gleaner Company's newspapers, the Jamaica Gleaner and The Star.

Neita retired from the Jamaica Gleaner in 1979.

Neita also worked as the editor of Who's Who Jamaica, a Gleaner publication that was the precursor to the present day Jamaica Directory of Personalities. He also worked for the executive committee of the Jamaica Press Association for several years during his career.

== Death ==
Neita had been in declining health towards the end of his life. He lost his sight approximately six years before his death.

Clifton Neita died on 13 August 2007 at his home in St. James Court, Kingsway, Jamaica. He was survived by his wife, Elaine, and his daughter, Melanie.
