= Klopp =

Klopp is a German surname, from Middle Low German klopper ‘clapper’, ‘bobbin’, ‘hammer’. Compare Chlodobert

Notable people with the surname include:

- Jürgen Klopp (born 1967), German football player and manager
- Nico Klopp (1894–1930), Luxembourgish painter
- Onno Klopp (1822–1903), German historian
- Paul Klopp (born 1957), politician in Ontario, Canada
- Reid Klopp (born 1984), USA-born US Virgin Islands soccer player
- Stan Klopp (1910–1980), American Major League Baseball pitcher

== See also ==
- Klopp Castle, in the Upper Middle Rhine Valley
- Klop (disambiguation)
