= Auguste Digot =

French historian

Auguste Digot (28 August 1815, Nancy – 29 May 1864, idem, aged 48) was a 19th-century French historian whose work was dedicated to the history of Lorraine.

== Works ==
A lawyer and member of the Académie de Stanislas, Digot wrote several articles and books:

- 1847: Histoire de Neufchâteau, (Reprint Ed. Lorisse, déc. 2004) 120 pages ISBN 2-87760-424-1
- 1856: Histoire de la Lorraine, in 6 volumes (more than 400 pages each) published by Vagner in Nancy - Reprint Ed. Lacour-Ollé, 2002 - ISBN 2-84149-253-2
- 1860: Notice biographique et littéraire sur Dom Augustin Calmet
- 1863: Histoire du royaume d'Austrasie in 4 volumes (Vagner, Nancy)
- 1864: Mémoire sur les décorations des chapitres de Lorraine, Lucien Wiener éditeur, Nancy, 41 p. + 4 pl.

== Sources ==
- R. Limouzin-Lamothe, "Digot (Auguste)" in Dictionnaire de biographie française, vol. 11, Paris, 1967
