= Kees Klop =

Dutch academic

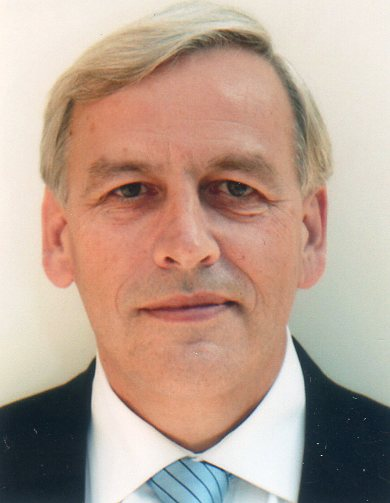
Kees Klop

Kees Klop (18 December 1947 in The Hague – 31 August 2007 in The Hague) was a Dutch professor of political ethics at Radboud University Nijmegen. Kees Klop served as the chairman of the NCRV from 2001 to 2005. He also worked as a columnist for the Trouw.
