= Stig Johansson (water polo) =

Swedish water polo player

Personal information
- Nationality: Swedish
- Born: 7 April 1924; Borås, Sweden
- Died: 14 August 2007 (aged 83); Gothenburg, Sweden

Sport
- Sport: Water polo

Stig Johansson (7 April 1924 – 14 August 2007) was a Swedish water polo player. He competed in the men's tournament at the 1952 Summer Olympics.
