= Per Henriksen (Danish footballer) =

Danish footballer

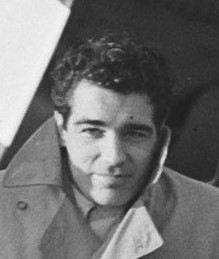
- Henriksen in 1955

Personal information
- Date of birth: 15 August 1929
- Date of death: 7 August 2007 (aged 77)

International career
Years	Team	Apps	(Gls)
1953–1956	Denmark	14	(0)

Per Henriksen (15 August 1929 – 7 August 2007) was a Danish footballer. He played in 14 matches for the Denmark national football team from 1953 to 1956.
