= Roville-devant-Bayon =

- Commune
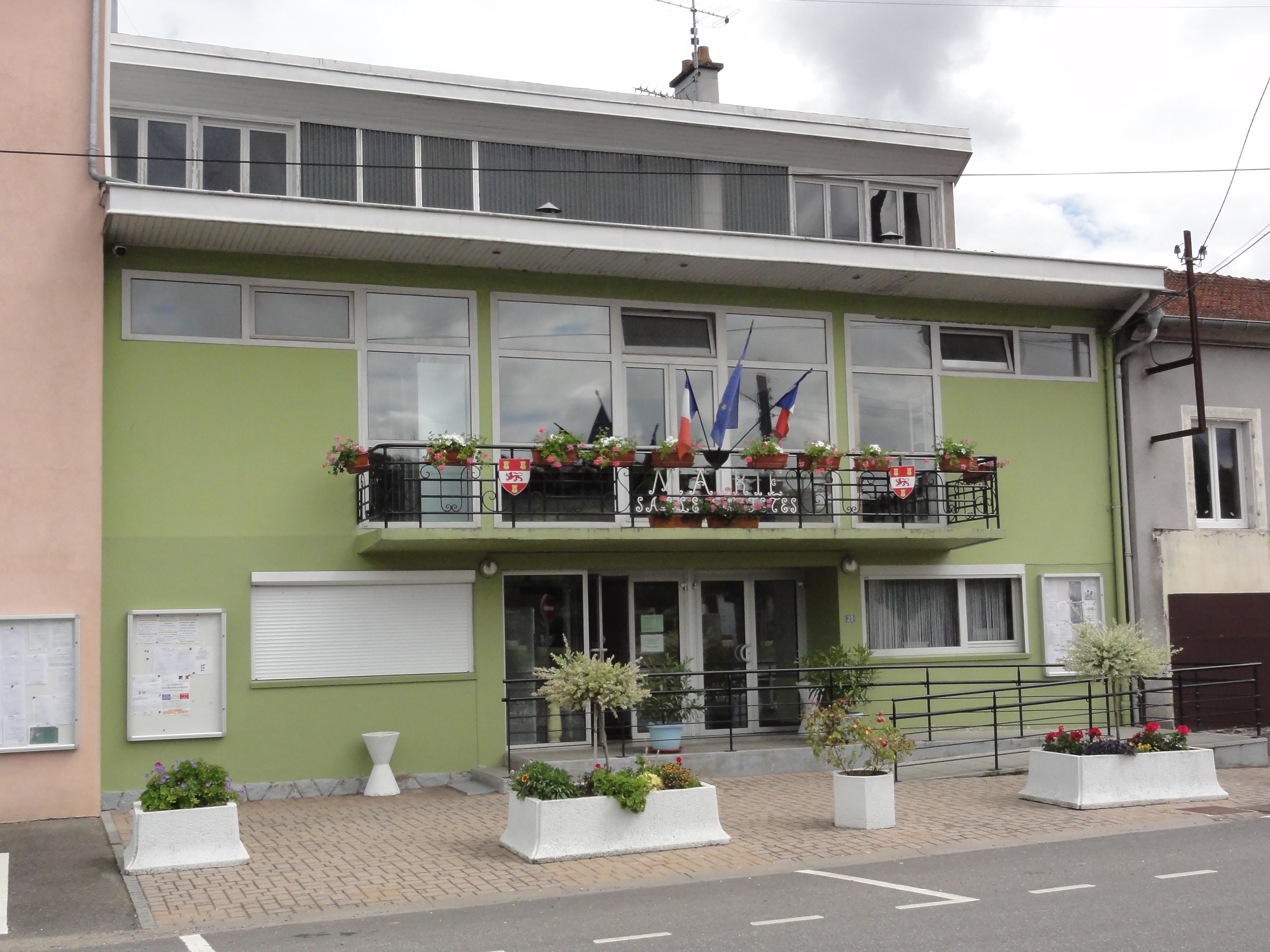
- The town hall in Roville-devant-Bayon

- Coat of arms
- Location of Roville-devant-Bayon
- Location within France Location within Grand Est
- Coordinates: 48°28′01″N 6°17′34″E
- Country: France
- Region: Grand Est
- Department: Meurthe-et-Moselle
- Arrondissement: Nancy
- Canton: Meine au Saintois
- Intercommunality: Pays du Saintois

Government
  - Mayor (2020–2026): Clara Breton
- Area^{1}: 4.43 km^{2} (1.71 sq mi)
- Elevation: 245 m (804 ft)
- Highest elevation: 342 m (1,122 ft)
- Lowest elevation: 243 m (797 ft)
- Population (2023): 739
  - Density: 167/km^{2} (432/sq mi)
- Time zone: UTC+01:00 (CET)
  - Summer (DST): UTC+02:00 (CEST)
- INSEE/Postal code: 54465 /54290
- ^{1} French Land Register data, which excludes lakes, ponds, glaciers > 1 km^{2} (0.386 sq mi or 247 acres) and river estuaries.

Roville-devant-Bayon (French pronunciation: [ʁɔvil dəvɑ̃ bajɔ̃], literally Roville before Bayon) is a commune in the Meurthe-et-Moselle department in north-eastern France.

== See also ==
- Communes of the Meurthe-et-Moselle department
