= Fencing at the 1948 Summer Olympics – Men's épée =

Olympic fencing tournament

Men's épée at the Games of the XIV Olympiad
- Fencing pictogram
- Venue: British Empire Exhibition
- Dates: 7–9 August 1948
- Competitors: 66 from 25 nations

Medalists
1st place, gold medalist(s)		Luigi Cantone; Italy
2nd place, silver medalist(s)		Oswald Zappelli; Switzerland
3rd place, bronze medalist(s)		Edoardo Mangiarotti; Italy

The men's épée was one of seven fencing events on the fencing at the 1948 Summer Olympics programme. It was the tenth appearance of the event. The competition was held from 7 August 1948 to 9 August 1948. 66 fencers from 25 nations competed. The event was won by Luigi Cantone of Italy, the nation's third consecutive victory in the men's épée (matching France for most all-time). Italy also earned its third consecutive bronze medal in the event, with Edoardo Mangiarotti's third-place finish. Between the two Italians was Oswald Zappelli of Switzerland, taking the silver medal.

== Background ==
This was the 10th appearance of the event, which was not held at the first Games in 1896 (with only foil and sabre events held) but has been held at every Summer Olympics since 1900.

One of the 10 finalists from the pre-war 1936 Games returned: fifth-place finisher Charles Debeur of Belgium. The reigning (1947) World Champion, Édouard Artigas of France, competed in the team event but not the individual event.

Colombia and Luxembourg each made their debut in the event. Belgium and the United States each appeared for the ninth time, tied for most among nations.

== Competition format ==
The competition format was pool play round-robin, with bouts to three touches. Not all bouts were played in some pools if not necessary to determine advancement. Ties were broken through fence-off bouts ("barrages") in early rounds if necessary for determining advancement, but by touches received in final rounds (and for non-advancement-necessary placing in earlier rounds). A barrage was held for the silver and bronze medals when the two fencers finished event on record, touches received, and touches scored.

The 1948 competition introduced byes for team event finalists.

- Round 1: 8 pools of between 5 and 8 fencers each. The top 4 fencers in each pool advanced to the quarterfinals.
- Quarterfinals: 6 pools between 6 and 7 fencers each. The top 3 fencers in each pool advanced to the semifinals.
- Semifinals: 2 pools of 9 fencers each. The top 5 fencers in each pool advanced to the final.
- Final: 1 pool of 10 fencers.

== Schedule ==
All times are British Summer Time (UTC+1)

Date	Time	Round
Saturday, 7 August 1948		Round 1
Monday, 9 August 1948		Quarterfinals; Semifinals; Final

== Results ==
=== Round 1 ===
The top 4 finishers in each pool advanced to round 2. Fencers from the four teams that advanced to the final of the men's team épée event received byes through round 1:

- Denmark: Mogens Lüchow and Ib Nielsen
- France: Marcel Desprets, Henri Guérin, and Henri Lepage
- Italy: Carlo Agostoni, Luigi Cantone, and Edoardo Mangiarotti
- Sweden: Frank Cervell, Carl Forssell, and Bengt Ljungquist

==== Pool 1 ====
Rank	Fencer	Nation	Wins	Losses	Notes
1	Robert Lips	Switzerland	4	2	Q
2	Mohamed Abdel Rahman	Egypt	4	2	Q
3	Raúl Saucedo	Argentina	3	3	Q
4	Paul Anen	Luxembourg	3	3	Q
5	Álvaro Pinto	Portugal	2	4	
6	Enrique Accorsi	Chile	2	4	
7	Ilmari Vartia	Finland	1	5	

==== Pool 2 ====
Biancalana defeated Mørch and Wolff in a three-way barrage for fourth place.

Rank	Fencer	Nation	Wins	Losses	Notes
1	Antonio Villamil	Argentina	6	1	Q
2	Émile Gretsch	Luxembourg	4	3	Q
3	Nils Sjöblom	Finland	4	3	Q
4	Mario Biancalana	Brazil	3	4	Q
5	Claus Mørch Sr.	Norway	3	4	
6	Albert Wolff	United States	3	4	
7	Manuel Chagas	Portugal	2	5	
8	Alfonso Ahumada	Colombia	0	7	

==== Pool 3 ====
Simonetti defeated Meraz and Pouliot in a three-way barrage for fourth place.

Rank	Fencer	Nation	Wins	Losses	Notes
1	Bert Pelling	Great Britain	5	0	Q
2	Rodolphe Spillmann	Switzerland	5	1	Q
3	Charles Debeur	Belgium	3	2	Q
4	Vito Simonetti	Argentina	2	4	Q
5	Emilio Meraz	Mexico	2	4	
6	Georges Pouliot	Canada	2	4	
7	Ignacio Goldstein	Chile	0	6	

==== Pool 4 ====
Radoux defeated de Barros and Nawrocki in a three-way barrage for fourth place.

Rank	Fencer	Nation	Wins	Losses	Notes
1	Pál Dunay	Hungary	6	1	Q
2	Alf Horn	Canada	6	1	Q
3	Charles de Beaumont	Great Britain	5	2	Q
4	Jean-Marie Radoux	Belgium	3	4	Q
5	Fortunato de Barros	Brazil	3	4	
6	Jan Nawrocki	Poland	3	4	
7	Ioannis Karamazakis	Greece	1	6	
8	Francisco Valero	Mexico	0	7	

==== Pool 5 ====
Rank	Fencer	Nation	Wins	Losses	Notes
1	Oswald Zappelli	Switzerland	5	1	Q
2	Antonio Haro	Mexico	3	3	Q
2	Ronald Parfitt	Great Britain	3	3	Q
4	Andreas Skotidas	Greece	3	3	Q
5	Raoul Henkart	Belgium	2	4	
6	Béla Mikla	Hungary	2	4	
7	Rajmund Karwicki	Poland	1	5	

==== Pool 6 ====
Rank	Fencer	Nation	Wins	Losses	Notes
1	Egill Knutzen	Norway	5	1	Q
2	Roland Asselin	Canada	5	2	Q
3	Imre Hennyei	Hungary	4	3	Q
4	Roberto Camargo	Colombia	4	3	Q
5	Erkki Kerttula	Finland	3	4	
6	Henrique de Aguilar	Brazil	3	4	
7	Athanasios Nanopoulos	Greece	2	5	
8	Jean-Fernand Leischen	Luxembourg	0	6	

==== Pool 7 ====
Younes defeated Iturri in a barrage for fourth place.

Rank	Fencer	Nation	Wins	Losses	Notes
1	Joe de Capriles	United States	4	0	Q
2	Alfred Eriksen	Norway	2	2	Q
3	Carlos Lamar	Cuba	2	2	Q
4	Mahmoud Younes	Egypt	1	3	Q
5	Carlos Iturri	Peru	1	3	

==== Pool 8 ====
Younes defeated Iturri in a barrage for fourth place.

Rank	Fencer	Nation	Wins	Losses	Notes
1	Norman Lewis	United States	4	0	Q
2	Roelof Hordijk	Netherlands	1	2	Q
3	Roberto Mañalich	Cuba	1	2	Q
4	Jean Asfar	Egypt	1	3	Q
5	Emílio Lino	Portugal	0	4	

=== Quarterfinals ===
The top 3 finishers in each pool advanced to the semifinals.

==== Quarterfinal 1 ====
Camargo defeated de Capriles and Horn in a three-way barrage for third place.

Rank	Fencer	Nation	Wins	Losses	Notes
1	Oswald Zappelli	Switzerland	6	0	Q
2	Luigi Cantone	Italy	4	2	Q
3	Roberto Camargo	Colombia	3	3	Q
4	Joe de Capriles	United States	3	3	
5	Alf Horn	Canada	3	3	
6	Nils Sjöblom	Finland	1	5	
7	Andreas Skotidas	Greece	1	5	

==== Quarterfinal 2 ====
Biancalana and Saucedo defeated de Beaumont in a three-way barrage for second and third place.

Rank	Fencer	Nation	Wins	Losses	Notes
1	Carlo Agostoni	Italy	5	2	Q
2	Mario Biancalana	Brazil	4	3	Q
3	Raúl Saucedo	Argentina	4	3	Q
4	Charles de Beaumont	Great Britain	4	3	
5	Frank Cervell	Sweden	3	4	
6	Mohamed Abdel Rahman	Egypt	3	4	
7	Roelof Hordijk	Netherlands	2	4	
8	Carlos Lamar	Cuba	1	5	

==== Quarterfinal 3 ====
Rank	Fencer	Nation	Wins	Losses	Notes
1	Émile Gretsch	Luxembourg	5	1	Q
2	Edoardo Mangiarotti	Italy	4	2	Q
3	Bengt Ljungquist	Sweden	4	2	Q
4	Antonio Villamil	Argentina	3	3	
5	Bert Pelling	Great Britain	2	4	
6	Alfred Eriksen	Norway	2	4	
7	Antonio Haro	Mexico	1	5	

==== Quarterfinal 4 ====
Rank	Fencer	Nation	Wins	Losses	Notes
1	Norman Lewis	United States	4	1	Q
2	Marcel Desprets	France	4	2	Q
3	Charles Debeur	Belgium	4	2	Q
4	Mogens Lüchow	Denmark	2	3	
5	Robert Lips	Switzerland	1	2	
6	Vito Simonetti	Argentina	1	3	
7	Imre Hennyei	Hungary	0	5	

==== Quarterfinal 5 ====
Lepage defeated Anen and Nielsen in a three-way barrage for third place.

Rank	Fencer	Nation	Wins	Losses	Notes
1	Mahmoud Younes	Egypt	4	2	Q
2	Jean-Marie Radoux	Belgium	4	2	Q
3	Henri Lepage	France	3	3	Q
4	Paul Anen	Luxembourg	3	3	
5	Ib Nielsen	Denmark	3	3	
6	Rodolphe Spillmann	Switzerland	1	5	
6	Pál Dunay	Hungary	1	5	

==== Quarterfinal 6 ====
Rank	Fencer	Nation	Wins	Losses	Notes
1	Henri Guérin	France	4	1	Q
2	Ronald Parfitt	Great Britain	4	1	Q
3	Egill Knutzen	Norway	4	2	Q
4	Roberto Mañalich	Cuba	3	3	
5	Jean Asfar	Egypt	2	3	
6	Carl Forssell	Sweden	2	4	
7	Roland Asselin	Canada	0	5	

=== Semifinals ===
The top 5 finishers in each pool advanced to the final.

==== Semifinal 1 ====
Agostoni defeated Ljungquist in a barrage for fifth place.

Rank	Fencer	Nation	Wins	Losses	Notes
1	Norman Lewis	United States	6	1	Q
2	Jean-Marie Radoux	Belgium	5	3	Q
3	Luigi Cantone	Italy	4	2	Q
4	Henri Lepage	France	4	2	Q
5	Carlo Agostoni	Italy	3	4	Q
6	Bengt Ljungquist	Sweden	3	4	
7	Egill Knutzen	Norway	1	5	
7	Raúl Saucedo	Argentina	1	6	
9	Roberto Camargo	Colombia	0	2	DNF

==== Semifinal 2 ====
Rank	Fencer	Nation	Wins	Losses	Notes
1	Ronald Parfitt	Great Britain	6	2	Q
2	Henri Guérin	France	5	3	Q
3	Émile Gretsch	Luxembourg	4	3	Q
3	Edoardo Mangiarotti	Italy	4	3	Q
3	Oswald Zappelli	Switzerland	4	4	Q
6	Marcel Desprets	France	3	5	
7	Mario Biancalana	Brazil	3	5	
8	Charles Debeur	Belgium	3	5	
9	Mahmoud Younes	Egypt	1	7	

=== Final ===
Zappelli and Mangiarotti finished tied on win–loss record, touches received, and touches scored. Rather than use the head-to-head results from the round-robin (Zappelli had defeated Mangiarotti 3–0 in their bout), they faced each other in a barrage for silver and bronze medals. Zappelli won, 3–0 again.

Rank	Fencer	Nation	Wins	Losses	TS	TR
1st place, gold medalist(s)	Luigi Cantone	Italy	7	2	24	15
2nd place, silver medalist(s)	Oswald Zappelli	Switzerland	5	4	20	17
3rd place, bronze medalist(s)	Edoardo Mangiarotti	Italy	5	4	20	17
4	Henri Guérin	France	5	4	20	19
5	Jean-Marie Radoux	Belgium	5	4	19	20
6	Henri Lepage	France	4	5	19	20
7	Carlo Agostoni	Italy	4	5	22	21
8	Émile Gretsch	Luxembourg	3	6	16	22
9	Norman Lewis	United States	3	6	20	24
10	Ronald Parfitt	Great Britain	2	7	18	23
