= Fencing at the 1948 Summer Olympics – Men's team épée =

Men's team épée at the Games of the XIV Olympiad
- Venue: Wembley Palace of Engineering, London
- Dates: 5–6 August 1948
- Competitors: 113 from 21 nations

Medalists
1st place, gold medalist(s)		Henri Guérin; Henri Lepage; Marcel Desprets; Michel Pécheux; Édouard Artigas; Maurice Huet	France
2nd place, silver medalist(s)		Edoardo Mangiarotti; Carlo Agostoni; Dario Mangiarotti; Gino Cantone; Marco Antonio Mandruzzato; Fiorenzo Marini	Italy
3rd place, bronze medalist(s)		Sven Thofelt; Per Carleson; Frank Cervell; Carl Forssell; Bengt Ljungquist; Arne Tollbom	Sweden

The men's team épée was one of seven fencing events on the fencing at the 1948 Summer Olympics programme. It was the eighth appearance of the event. The competition was held from 5 August 1948 to 6 August 1948. 113 fencers from 21 nations competed.

The competition format continued the pool play round-robin from prior years. Each of the four fencers from one team would face each of the four from the other, for a total of 16 bouts per match. Bouts were to three touches. The team that won more bouts won the match, with competition potentially stopping when one team reached 9 points out of the possible 16 (this did not always occur and matches sometimes continued). If the bouts were 8–8, touches received was used to determine the winning team. (Because double-loss bouts were possible, these victory conditions were adjusted where necessary.) Pool matches unnecessary to the result were not played.

== Rosters ==
Argentina

- Vito Simonetti
- Antonio Villamil
- Raúl Saucedo
- Floro Díaz
- Jorge Balza
- Adolfo Guido Lavalle

Belgium

- Raymond Stasse
- Léopold Hauben
- Raymond Bru
- Jean-Marie Radoux
- Raoul Henkart
- Charles Debeur

Brazil

- Mario Biancalana
- Fortunato de Barros
- Henrique de Aguilar
- Walter de Paula
- Salvatore Scianamea

Canada

- Robert Desjarlais
- Alf Horn
- Roland Asselin
- Georges Pouliot

Cuba

- Roberto Mañalich
- Carlos Lamar
- Armando Barrientos
- Juan Antonio Martínez

Denmark

- Mogens Lüchow
- Erik Andersen
- Ib Nielsen
- René Dybkær
- Jakob Lyng
- Kenneth Flindt

Egypt

- Salah Dessouki
- Jean Asfar
- Mahmoud Younes
- Mohamed Abdel Rahman
- Osman Abdel Hafeez

Finland

- Nils Sjöblom
- Olavi Larkas
- Erkki Kerttula
- Ilmari Vartia
- Kauko Jalkanen

France

- Henri Guérin
- Henri Lepage
- Marcel Desprets
- Michel Pécheux
- Édouard Artigas
- Maurice Huet

Great Britain

- Charles de Beaumont
- Terry Beddard
- Ronald Parfitt
- Archibald Craig
- Michael McCready
- Bert Pelling

Greece

- Athanasios Nanopoulos
- Andreas Skotidas
- Stefanos Zintzos
- Konstantinos Bembis
- Ioannis Karamazakis

Hungary

- Imre Hennyei
- Pál Dunay
- Béla Rerrich
- Béla Mikla
- Lajos Balthazár
- Béla Bay

Italy

- Edoardo Mangiarotti
- Carlo Agostoni
- Dario Mangiarotti
- Gino Cantone
- Marco Antonio Mandruzzato
- Fiorenzo Marini

Luxembourg

- Jean-Fernand Leischen
- Paul Anen
- Émile Gretsch
- Gust Lamesch
- Erny Putz

Mexico

- Emilio Meraz
- Francisco Valero
- Benito Ramos
- Antonio Haro

Norway

- Johan von Koss
- Egill Knutzen
- Alfred Eriksen
- Claus Mørch Sr.
- Sverre Gillebo

Poland

- Antoni Sobik
- Rajmund Karwicki
- Jan Nawrocki
- Teodor Zaczyk
- Bolesław Banaś

Portugal

- Manuel Chagas
- José de Castro
- Emílio Lino
- Álvaro Pinto
- João Costa
- Carlos Dias

Sweden

- Sven Thofelt
- Per Carleson
- Frank Cervell
- Carl Forssell
- Bengt Ljungquist
- Arne Tollbom

Switzerland

- Fernand Thiébaud
- Robert Lips
- Jean Hauert
- Oswald Zappelli
- Otto Rüfenacht
- Marc Chamay

United States

- Norman Lewis
- Andrew Boyd
- Joe de Capriles
- Donald Thompson
- Albert Wolff
- Ralph Goldstein

== Results ==
=== Round 1 ===
The top two teams in each pool advanced to round 2.

==== Pool 1 ====
Argentina beat Poland 10–6, Poland beat Cuba 8–6, and Argentina beat Cuba 9–5.

Rank	Nation	MW	ML	BW	BL	Notes
1	Argentina	2	0	19	11	Q
2	Poland	1	1	14	16	Q
3	Cuba	0	2	11	17	

==== Pool 2 ====
Belgium defeated Mexico 10–6, Denmark beat Canada 13–2, Belgium beat Canada 12–1, and Denmark defeated Mexico 9–2.

Rank	Nation	MW	ML	BW	BL	Notes
1	Denmark	2	0	22	4	Q
2	Belgium	2	0	22	7	Q
3	Mexico	0	2	8	17	
4	Canada	0	2	3	25	

==== Pool 3 ====
The United States (9–5) and Luxembourg (8–6) each defeated Finland.

Rank	Nation	MW	ML	BW	BL	Notes
1	United States	1	0	9	5	Q
2	Luxembourg	1	0	8	6	Q
3	Finland	0	2	11	17	

==== Pool 4 ====
Chile withdrew before competition, leaving France and Norway to advance.

Rank	Nation	MW	ML	BW	BL	Notes
1	France	0	0	0	0	Q
1	Norway	0	0	0	0	Q
3	Chile	0	0	0	0	Withdrew

==== Pool 5 ====
Italy (14–2) and Great Britain (8–6) each defeated Brazil.

Rank	Nation	MW	ML	BW	BL	Notes
1	Italy	1	0	14	2	Q
2	Great Britain	1	0	8	6	Q
3	Brazil	0	2	8	22	

==== Pool 6 ====
Egypt (10–5) and Switzerland (8–6) each defeated Portugal.

Rank	Nation	MW	ML	BW	BL	Notes
1	Egypt	1	0	10	5	Q
2	Switzerland	1	0	8	6	Q
3	Portugal	0	2	11	18	

==== Pool 7 ====
Sweden (16–0) and Hungary (9–1) each defeated Greece.

Rank	Nation	MW	ML	BW	BL	Notes
1	Sweden	1	0	16	0	Q
2	Hungary	1	0	9	1	Q
3	Greece	0	2	1	25	

=== Round 2 ===
The top two teams in each pool advanced to the semifinals.

==== Pool 1 ====
Italy beat Poland 14–1, Hungary beat Norway 7–7 (34–35 touches against), Italy beat Norway 12–2, and Hungary beat Poland 10–6.

Rank	Nation	MW	ML	BW	BL	Notes
1	Italy	2	0	26	3	Q
2	Hungary	2	0	17	13	Q
3	Norway	0	2	9	19	
4	Poland	0	2	7	24	

==== Pool 2 ====
France defeated Denmark 12–4, Egypt beat Great Britain 11–5, France beat Great Britain 12–3, Denmark beat Egypt 8–6, France defeated Egypt 8–5, and Denmark defeated Great Britain 8–4.

Rank	Nation	MW	ML	BW	BL	Notes
1	France	3	0	32	12	Q
2	Denmark	2	1	20	22	Q
3	Egypt	1	2	22	21	
4	Great Britain	0	3	12	31	

==== Pool 3 ====
Switzerland (11–3) and Sweden (9–3) each defeated Argentina.

Rank	Nation	MW	ML	BW	BL	Notes
1	Switzerland	1	0	11	3	Q
2	Sweden	1	0	9	3	Q
3	Argentina	0	2	6	20	

==== Pool 4 ====
Belgium (9–5) and Luxembourg (8–6) each defeated the United States.

Rank	Nation	MW	ML	BW	BL	Notes
1	Belgium	1	0	9	5	Q
2	Luxembourg	1	0	8	6	Q
3	United States	0	2	11	17	

=== Semifinals ===
The top two teams in each pool advanced to the final.

==== Semifinal 1 ====
This semifinal was one of the more chaotic of the tournament, as Belgium defeated the heavy favorite France but also lost to the last-place Switzerland.

Denmark beat Poland 7–6, France beat Switzerland 12–3, Belgium defeated France 10–5, Denmark beat Switzerland 12–3, Switzerland beat Belgium 7–7 (33–39 touches against), and France beat Denmark 7–5.

Rank	Nation	MW	ML	BW	BL	Notes
1	Denmark	2	1	24	16	Q
2	France	2	1	25	18	Q
3	Belgium	1	2	23	19	
4	Switzerland	1	2	13	33	

==== Semifinal 2 ====
Sweden defeated Hungary 15–0, Italy beat Luxembourg 11–4, Sweden beat Luxembourg 11–3, and Italy defeated Hungary 8–1.

Rank	Nation	MW	ML	BW	BL	Notes
1	Sweden	2	0	26	3	Q
2	Italy	2	0	19	5	Q
3	Luxembourg	0	2	7	22	
4	Hungary	0	2	1	23	

=== Final ===
In the first pairings, France defeated Sweden 11–4 and Italy beat Denmark 12–4. The second pairings saw the favorites again win, with France 9–1 over Denmark and Italy 8–6 over Sweden. The Sweden-Denmark match was thus a de facto bronze medal match, with Sweden winning 8–7. France defeated Italy 11–5 to take the gold medal.

Rank	Nation	MW	ML	BW	BL
1st place, gold medalist(s)	France	3	0	31	10
2nd place, silver medalist(s)	Italy	2	1	25	21
3rd place, bronze medalist(s)	Sweden	1	2	18	26
4	Denmark	0	3	12	29
