= List of 1948 Summer Olympics medal winners =

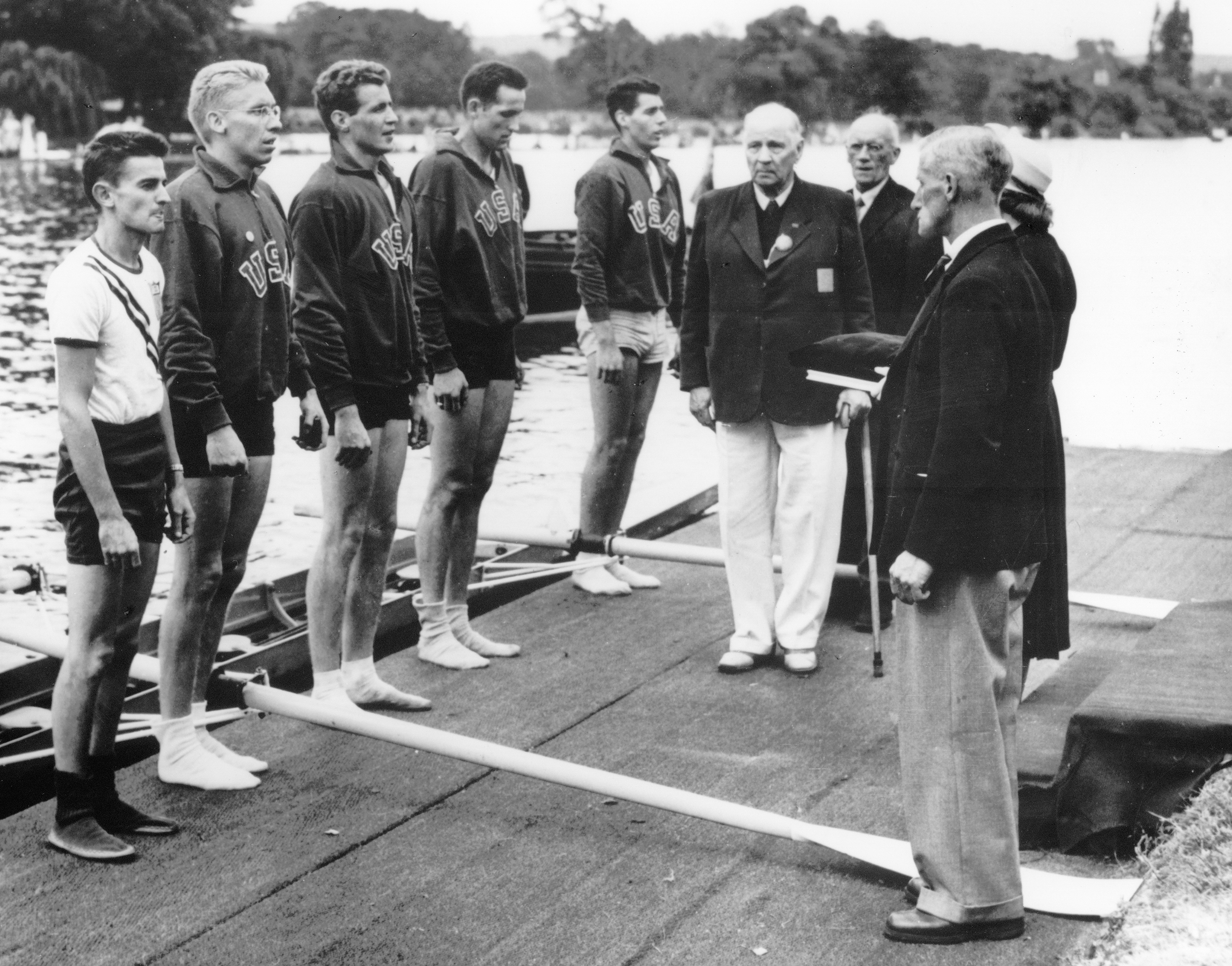
The United States team being awarded their gold medals for the Men's coxed fours

The 1948 Summer Olympics (also known as the Games of the XIV Olympiad) was an international multi-sport event held from 29 July to 14 August 1948, in London, United Kingdom.

== Athletics ==
Event	Gold	Silver	Bronze
Men's 100 m	Harrison Dillard; United States	Barney Ewell; United States	Lloyd La Beach; Panama
Women's 100 m	Fanny Blankers-Koen; Netherlands	Dorothy Manley; Great Britain	Shirley Strickland de la Hunty; Australia
Men's 200 m	Mel Patton; United States	Barney Ewell; United States	Lloyd La Beach; Panama
Women's 200 m	Fanny Blankers-Koen; Netherlands	Audrey Williamson; Great Britain	Audrey Patterson; United States
Men's 400 m	Arthur Wint; Jamaica	Herb McKenley; Jamaica	Mal Whitfield; United States
Men's 800 m	Mal Whitfield; United States	Arthur Wint; Jamaica	Marcel Hansenne; France
Men's 1500 m	Henry Eriksson; Sweden	Lennart Strand; Sweden	Wim Slijkhuis; Netherlands
Men's 5000 m	Gaston Reiff; Belgium	Emil Zátopek; Czechoslovakia	Wim Slijkhuis; Netherlands
Men's 10000 m	Emil Zátopek; Czechoslovakia	Alain Mimoun; France	Bertil Albertsson; Sweden
Men's 110 m hurdles	Bill Porter; United States	Clyde Scott; United States	Craig Dixon; United States
Men's 400 m hurdles	Roy Cochran; United States	Duncan White; Ceylon	Rune Larsson; Sweden
Women's 80 m hurdles	Fanny Blankers-Koen; Netherlands	Maureen Gardner; Great Britain	Shirley Strickland de la Hunty; Australia
Men's 3000 m steeplechase	Tore Sjöstrand; Sweden	Erik Elmsäter; Sweden	Göte Hagström; Sweden
Men's 4×100 m relay	United States; Barney Ewell; Lorenzo Wright; Harrison Dillard; Mel Patton	Great Britain; Jack Archer; Jack Gregory; Alastair McCorquodale; Ken Jones	Italy; Enrico Perucconi; Antonio Siddi; Carlo Monti; Michele Tito
Women's 4×100 m relay	Netherlands; Xenia Stad-de Jong; Nettie Witziers-Timmer; Gerda van der Kade-Koudijs; Fanny Blankers-Koen	Australia; Shirley Strickland de la Hunty; June Maston; Betty McKinnon; Joyce King	Canada; Viola Myers; Nancy Mackay; Diane Foster; Patricia Jones
Men's 4×400 m relay	United States; Art Harnden; Cliff Bourland; Roy Cochran; Mal Whitfield	France; Jean Kerebel; Francis Schewetta; Robert Chef d'Hôtel; Jacques Lunis	Sweden; Kurt Lundquist; Lars-Erik Wolfbrandt; Folke Alnevik; Rune Larsson
Men's decathlon	Bob Mathias; United States	Ignace Heinrich; France	Floyd Simmons; United States
Men's 10 km walk	John Mikaelsson; Sweden	Ingemar Johansson; Sweden	Fritz Schwab; Switzerland
Men's 50 km walk	John Ljunggren; Sweden	Gaston Godel; Switzerland	Tebbs Lloyd Johnson; Great Britain
Men's marathon	Delfo Cabrera; Argentina	Tom Richards; Great Britain	Étienne Gailly; Belgium
Men's long jump	Willie Steele; United States	Theodore Bruce; Australia	Herb Douglas; United States
Women's long jump	Olga Gyarmati; Hungary	Noemí Simonetto de Portela; Argentina	Ann-Britt Leyman; Sweden
Men's triple jump	Arne Åhman; Sweden	George Avery; Australia	Ruhi Sarıalp; Turkey
Men's high jump	Jack Winter; Australia	Bjørn Paulson; Norway	George Stanich; United States
Women's high jump	Alice Coachman; United States	Dorothy Odam-Tyler; Great Britain	Micheline Ostermeyer; France
Men's pole vault	Guinn Smith; United States	Erkki Kataja; Finland	Bob Richards; United States
Men's shot put	Wilbur Thompson; United States	Jim Delaney; United States	Jim Fuchs; United States
Women's shot put	Micheline Ostermeyer; France	Amelia Piccinini; Italy	Ine Schäffer; Austria
Men's discus throw	Adolfo Consolini; Italy	Giuseppe Tosi; Italy	Fortune Gordien; United States
Women's discus throw	Micheline Ostermeyer; France	Edera Cordiale-Gentile; Italy	Jacqueline Mazéas; France
Men's javelin throw	Tapio Rautavaara; Finland	Steve Seymour; United States	József Várszegi; Hungary
Women's javelin throw	Herma Bauma; Austria	Kaisa Parviainen; Finland	Lily Carlstedt-Kelsby; Denmark
Men's hammer throw	Imre Németh; Hungary	Ivan Gubijan; Yugoslavia	Bob Bennett; United States

== Basketball ==
Event	Gold	Silver	Bronze
Men's tournament	United States; Cliff Barker; Don Barksdale; Ralph Beard; Lew Beck; Vince Boryla; Gordon Carpenter; Alex Groza; Wallace Jones; Bob Kurland; Ray Lumpp; R. C. Pitts; Jesse Renick; Jackie Robinson; Kenny Rollins	France; André Barrais; Michel Bonnevie; André Buffière; René Chocat; René Dérency; Maurice Desaymonnet; André Even; Maurice Girardot; Fernand Guillou; Raymond Offner; Jacques Perrier; Yvan Quénin; Lucien Rebuffic; Pierre Thiolon	Brazil; Algodão; Bráz; Marcus Vinícius Dias; Affonso Évora; Ruy de Freitas; Alexandre Gemignani; Alberto Marson; Alfredo da Motta; Nilton Pacheco; Massinet Sorcinelli

== Boxing ==
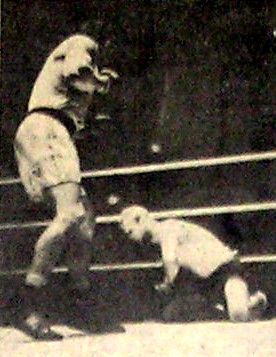
Rafael Iglesias knocking down Gunnar Nilsson in the men's heavyweight final

Event	Gold	Silver	Bronze
Flyweight (-51 kg / 112 lb)	Pascual Pérez; Argentina	Spartaco Bandinelli; Italy	Han Su-An; South Korea
Bantamweight (-54 kg / 118 lb)	Tibor Csík; Hungary	Gianni Zuddas; Italy	Juan Venegas; Puerto Rico
Featherweight (-58 kg / 126 lb)	Ernesto Formenti; Italy	Dennis Shepherd; South Africa	Aleksy Antkiewicz; Poland
Lightweight (-62 kg / 135 lb)	Gerald Dreyer; South Africa	Jos Vissers; Belgium	Svend Wad; Denmark
Welterweight (-67 kg / 147 lb)	Július Torma; Czechoslovakia	Hank Herring; United States	Alessandro D'Ottavio; Italy
Middleweight (-73 kg / 160 lb)	László Papp; Hungary	John Wright; Great Britain	Ivano Fontana; Italy
Light heavyweight (-80 kg / 175 lb)	George Hunter; South Africa	Don Scott; Great Britain	Mauro Cía; Argentina
Heavyweight (+80 kg/175 lb)	Rafael Iglesias; Argentina	Gunnar Nilsson; Sweden	John Arthur; South Africa

== Canoeing ==
=== Men's events ===
Event	Gold	Silver	Bronze
C-1 1000 m	Josef Holeček; Czechoslovakia	Douglas Bennett; Canada	Robert Boutigny; France
C-1 10000 m	František Čapek; Czechoslovakia	Frank Havens; United States	Norman Lane; Canada
C-2 1000 m	Czechoslovakia; Jan Brzák-Felix; Bohumil Kudrna	United States; Steven Lysak; Stephen Macknowski	France; Georges Dransart; Georges Gandil
C-2 10000 m	United States; Steven Lysak; Stephen Macknowski	Czechoslovakia; Václáv Havel; Jiří Pecka	France; Georges Dransart; Georges Gandil
K-1 1000 m	Gert Fredriksson; Sweden	Johan Andersen; Denmark	Henri Eberhardt; France
K-1 10000 m	Gert Fredriksson; Sweden	Kurt Wires; Finland	Eivind Skabo; Norway
K-2 1000 m	Sweden; Hans Berglund; Lennart Klingström	Denmark; Ejvind Hansen; Jakob Jensen	Finland; Thor Axelsson; Nils Björklöf
K-2 10000 m	Sweden; Gunnar Åkerlund; Hans Wetterström	Norway; Ivar Mathisen; Knut Østby	Finland; Thor Axelsson; Nils Björklöf

=== Women's events ===
Event	Gold	Silver	Bronze
K-1 500 m	Karen Hoff; Denmark	Alida van der Anker-Doedens; Netherlands	Fritzi Schwingl; Austria

== Cycling ==
Event	Gold	Silver	Bronze
Individual time trial	José Beyaert; France	Gerrit Voorting; Netherlands	Lode Wouters; Belgium
Team time trial	Belgium; Lode Wouters; Leon De Lathouwer; Eugène Van Roosbroeck	Great Britain; Bob Maitland; Tiny Thomas; Ian Scott	France; José Beyaert; Alain Moineau; Jacques Dupont
Time trial	Jacques Dupont; France	Pierre Nihant; Belgium	Tommy Godwin; Great Britain
Sprint	Mario Ghella; Italy	Reg Harris; Great Britain	Axel Schandorff; Denmark
Tandem	Italy; Ferdinando Terruzzi; Renato Perona	Great Britain; Reg Harris; Alan Bannister	France; René Faye; Gaston Dron
Team pursuit	France; Charles Coste; Serge Blusson; Fernand Decanali; Pierre Adam	Italy; Arnaldo Benfenati; Guido Bernardi; Anselmo Citterio; Rino Pucci	Great Britain; Alan Geldard; Tommy Godwin; David Ricketts; Wilf Waters

== Diving ==
Event	Gold	Silver	Bronze
Men's 3 metre springboard	Bruce Harlan; United States	Miller Anderson; United States	Sammy Lee; United States
Women's 3 metre springboard	Vicki Draves; United States	Zoe Ann Olsen-Jensen; United States	Patsy Elsener; United States
Men's 10 metre platform	Sammy Lee; United States	Bruce Harlan; United States	Joaquín Capilla; Mexico
Women's 10 metre platform	Vicki Draves; United States	Patsy Elsener; United States	Birte Christoffersen; Denmark

== Equestrian ==
Event	Gold	Silver	Bronze
Individual dressage	Hans Moser and Hummer; Switzerland	André Jousseaume and Harpagon; France	Gustaf Adolf Boltenstern Jr. and Trumf; Sweden
Team dressage	France; André Jousseaume and Harpagon; Jean Saint-Fort Paillard and Sous les Ceps; Maurice Buret and Saint Quen	United States; Robert Borg and Klingson; Earl Foster Thomson and Pancraft; Frank Henry and Reno Overdo	Portugal; Fernando Paes and Matamas; Francisco Valadas and Feitiço; Luís Mena e Silva and Fascinante
Individual eventing	Bernard Chevallier and Aiglonne; France	Frank Henry and Swing Low; United States	Robert Selfelt and Claque; Sweden
Team eventing	United States; Frank Henry and Swing Low; Charles Anderson and Reno Palisade; Earl Foster Thomson and Reno Rhythm	Sweden; Robert Selfelt and Claque; Olof Stahre and Komet; Sigurd Svensson and Dust	Mexico; Humberto Mariles and Parral; Raúl Campero and Tarahumara; Joaquín Solano and Malinche
Individual jumping	Humberto Mariles and Arete; Mexico	Rubén Uriza and Hatuey; Mexico	Jean-François d'Orgeix and Sucre de Pomme; France
Team jumping	Mexico; Humberto Mariles and Arete; Rubén Uriza and Hatuey; Alberto Valdés and Chihuahua	Spain; Jaime García and Bizarro; José Navarro Morenés and Quórum; Marcellino Gavilán and Forajido	Great Britain; Harry Llewellyn and Foxhunter; Henry Nicoll and Kilgeddin; Arthur Carr and Monty

== Fencing ==
=== Men's events ===
Event	Gold	Silver	Bronze
épée	Gino Cantone; Italy	Oswald Zappelli; Switzerland	Edoardo Mangiarotti; Italy
team épée	France; Henri Guérin; Henri Lepage; Marcel Desprets; Michel Pécheux; Édouard Artigas; Maurice Huet	Italy; Edoardo Mangiarotti; Carlo Agostoni; Dario Mangiarotti; Gino Cantone; Marco Antonio Mandruzzato; Fiorenzo Marini	Sweden; Sven Thofelt; Per Carleson; Frank Cervell; Carl Forssell; Bengt Ljungquist; Arne Tollbom
foil	Jéhan de Buhan; France	Christian d'Oriola; France	Lajos Maszlay; Hungary
team foil	France; André Bonin; Jéhan de Buhan; Jacques Lataste; René Bougnol; Philippe Christian d'Oriola; Adrien Rommel	Italy; Edoardo Mangiarotti; Manlio Di Rosa; Renzo Nostini; Giuliano Nostini; Giorgio Pellini; Saverio Ragno	Belgium; Georges de Bourguignon; Henri Paternóster; Édouard Yves; Raymond Bru; André Van De Werve De Vorsselaer; Paul Valcke
sabre	Aladár Gerevich; Hungary	Vincenzo Pinton; Italy	Pál Kovács; Hungary
team sabre	Hungary; Aladár Gerevich; Tibor Berczelly; Rudolf Kárpáti; Pál Kovács; László Rajcsányi; Bertalan Papp	Italy; Vincenzo Pinton; Gastone Darè; Carlo Turcato; Mauro Racca; Aldo Montano; Renzo Nostini	United States; Norman Cohn-Armitage; George Worth; Tibor Nyilas; Dean Cetrulo; Miguel de Capriles; James Flynn

=== Women's events ===
Event	Gold	Silver	Bronze
foil	Ilona Schachererné Elek; Hungary	Karen Lachmann; Denmark	Ellen Müller-Preis; Austria

== Field hockey ==
Event	Gold	Silver	Bronze
Men's tournament	India; Ranganandhan Francis; Tarlochan Singh Bawa; Akhtar Hussain; Leslie Claudius; Keshav Dutt; Jaswant Rajput; Kishan Lal; Kunwar Digvijay Singh; Reginald Rodrigues; Pat Jansen; Latif-ur Rehman; Leo Pinto; Randhir Singh Gentle; Amir Kumar; Maxie Vaz; Balbir Singh Sr. Lawrie Fernandes; Walter de Sousa; G. Nandy Singh; Gerry Glackan	Great Britain; Dave Brodie; George Sime; William Lindsay; Mickey Walford; Frank Reynolds; Robin Lindsay; John Peake; Neil White; Bob Adlard; Norman Borrett; Bill Griffiths; Ronald Davies	Netherlands; André Boerstra; Henk Bouwman; Piet Bromberg; Harry Derckx; Han Drijver; Dick Esser; Wim van Heel; Roepie Kruize; Jenne Langhout; Ton Richter; Dick Loggere; Eddy Tiel

== Football ==
Event	Gold	Silver	Bronze
Men's tournament	Sweden; Torsten Lindberg; Knut Nordahl; Erik Nilsson; Birger Rosengren; Bertil Nordahl; Sune Andersson; Kjell Rosén; Gunnar Gren; Gunnar Nordahl; Henry Carlsson; Nils Liedholm; Börje Leander	Yugoslavia; Ljubomir Lovrić; Miroslav Brozović; Branko Stanković; Zlatko Čajkovski; Miodrag Jovanović; Aleksandar Atanacković; Zvonko Cimermančić; Rajko Mitić; Stjepan Bobek; Željko Čajkovski; Bernard Vukas; Franjo Šoštarić; Prvoslav Mihajlović; Franjo Velfl; Kosta Tomašević	Denmark; Eigil Nielsen; Viggo Jensen; Knud Børge Overgaard; Axel Pilmark; Dion Ørnvold; Ivan Jensen; Johannes Plöger; Knud Lundberg; Carl Aage Præst; John Hansen; Jørgen Leschly Sørensen; Holger Seebach; Karl Aage Hansen

== Gymnastics ==
=== Men's events ===
Event	Gold	Silver	Bronze
All-Around, Individual	Veikko Huhtanen; Finland	Walter Lehmann; Switzerland	Paavo Aaltonen; Finland
All-Around, Team	Finland; Veikko Huhtanen; Paavo Aaltonen; Kalevi Laitinen; Olavi Rove; Einari Teräsvirta; Heikki Savolainen; Aleksanteri Saarvala; Sulo Salmi	Switzerland; Walter Lehmann; Josef Stalder; Christian Kipfer; Emil Studer; Robert Lucy; Michael Reusch; Melchior Thälmann; Karl Frei	Hungary; Lajos Tóth; Lajos Sántha; László Baranyai; Ferenc Pataki; János Mogyorósi-Klencs; Ferenc Várkői; József Fekete; Győző Mogyorossy
Floor exercise	Ferenc Pataki; Hungary	János Mogyorósi-Klencs; Hungary	Zdeněk Růžička; Czechoslovakia
Horizontal bar	Josef Stalder; Switzerland	Walter Lehmann; Switzerland	Veikko Huhtanen; Finland
Parallel bars	Michael Reusch; Switzerland	Veikko Huhtanen; Finland	Christian Kipfer; Switzerland
Parallel bars	Michael Reusch; Switzerland	Veikko Huhtanen; Finland	Josef Stalder; Switzerland
Pommel horse	Veikko Huhtanen; Finland	none	none
Pommel horse	Heikki Savolainen; Finland	none	none
Pommel horse	Paavo Aaltonen; Finland	none	none
Rings	Karl Frei; Switzerland	Michael Reusch; Switzerland	Zdeněk Růžička; Czechoslovakia
Vault	Paavo Aaltonen; Finland	Olavi Rove; Finland	János Mogyorósi-Klencs; Hungary
Vault	Paavo Aaltonen; Finland	Olavi Rove; Finland	Ferenc Pataki; Hungary
Vault	Paavo Aaltonen; Finland	Olavi Rove; Finland	Leo Sotorník; Czechoslovakia

=== Women's events ===
Event	Gold	Silver	Bronze
All-Around, Team	Czechoslovakia; Zdeňka Veřmiřovská; Zdeňka Honsová; Miloslava Misáková; Věra Růžičková; Božena Srncová; Milena Müllerová; Olga Šilhánová; Marie Kovářová	Hungary; Edit Perényiné Weckinger; Mária Kövi-Zalai; Irén Daruháziné Karcsics; Erzsébet Gulyás-Köteles; Erzsébet Balázs; Olga Lemhényiné Tass; Anna Fehér; Margit Sándorné Nagy	United States; Helen Schifano; Clara Schroth; Meta Elste; Marian Barone; Ladislava Bakanic; Connie Caruccio-Lenz; Anita Simonis; Dorothy Dalton

== Modern pentathlon ==
Event	Gold	Silver	Bronze
Men's	William Grut; Sweden	George Moore; United States	Gösta Gärdin; Sweden

== Rowing ==
Event	Gold	Silver	Bronze
single sculls	Merv Wood; Australia	Eduardo Risso; Uruguay	Romolo Catasta; Italy
double sculls	Great Britain; Dickie Burnell; Bert Bushnell	Denmark; Ebbe Parsner; Aage Larsen	Uruguay; William Jones; Juan Rodríguez
coxless pairs	Great Britain; Jack Wilson; Ran Laurie	Switzerland; Hans Kalt; Josef Kalt	Italy; Felice Fanetti; Bruno Boni
coxed pairs	Denmark; Finn Pedersen; Tage Henriksen; Carl-Ebbe Andersen	Italy; Giovanni Steffè; Aldo Tarlao; Alberto Radi	Hungary; Antal Szendey; Béla Zsitnik Sr. Róbert Zimonyi
coxless four	Italy; Giuseppe Moioli; Elio Morille; Giovanni Invernizzi; Franco Faggi	Denmark; Helge Halkjær; Aksel Bonde; Helge Muxoll Schrøder; Ib Storm Larsen	United States; Fred Kingsbury; Stu Griffing; Greg Gates; Bob Perew
coxed four	United States; Warren Westlund; Bob Martin; Bob Will; Gordy Giovanelli; Allen Morgan	Switzerland; Rudolf Reichling; Erich Schriever; Émile Knecht; Peter Stebler; André Moccand	Denmark; Erik Larsen; Børge Raahauge Nielsen; Henry Larsen; Harry Knudsen; Ib Olsen
eight	United States; Ian Turner; Dave Turner; Jim Hardy; George Ahlgren; Lloyd Butler; Dave Brown; Justus Smith; John Stack; Ralph Purchase	Great Britain; Chris Barton; Michael Lapage; Guy Richardson; Paul Bircher; Paul Massey; Brian Lloyd; John Meyrick; Alfred Mellows; Jack Dearlove	Norway; Kristoffer Lepsøe; Torstein Kråkenes; Hans Egill Hansen; Halfdan Gran-Olsen; Harald Kråkenes; Leif Næss; Thor Pedersen; Carl Monssen; Sigurd Monssen

== Sailing ==
Event	Gold	Silver	Bronze
Firefly	Paul Elvstrøm; Denmark	Ralph Evans; United States	Koos de Jong; Netherlands
Star	United States; Hilarious; Hilary Smart; Paul Smart	Cuba; Kurush III; Carlos de Cárdenas; Carlos de Cárdenas Jr.	Netherlands; BEM II; Bob Maas; Edward Stutterheim
Swallow	Great Britain; Swift; Stewart Morris; David Bond	Portugal; Symphony; Duarte de Almeida Bello; Fernando Pinto Coelho Bello	United States; Margaret; Lockwood Masters Pirie; Owen Cates Torrey Jr.
Dragon	Norway; Pan; Thor Thorvaldsen; Sigve Lie; Håkon Barfod	Sweden; Slaghoken; Folke Bohlin; Hugo Johnson; Gösta Brodin	Denmark; Snap; William Berntsen; Ole Berntsen; Klaus Baess
6 Metre	United States; Llanoria; Herman Whiton; Alfred Loomis; James Weekes; James Smith; Michael Mooney	Argentina; Djinn; Enrique Sieburger Sr. Emilio Homps; Rufino Rodríguez de la Torre; Rodolfo Rivademar; Enrique Sieburger Jr. Julio Sieburger	Sweden; Ali baba II; Tore Holm; Torsten Lord; Martin Hindorff; Karl-Robert Ameln; Gösta Salén

== Shooting ==
Event	Gold	Silver	Bronze
25 metre rapid fire pistol	Károly Takács; Hungary	Carlos Enrique Díaz Sáenz Valiente; Argentina	Sven Lundquist; Sweden
50 metre pistol	Edwin Vásquez; Peru	Rudolf Schnyder; Switzerland	Torsten Ullman; Sweden
50 metre rifle prone	Art Cook; United States	Walter Tomsen; United States	Jonas Jonsson; Sweden
300 metre rifle three positions	Emil Grünig; Switzerland	Pauli Janhonen; Finland	Willy Røgeberg; Norway

== Swimming ==
=== Men's events ===
Event	Gold	Silver	Bronze
100 m freestyle	Wally Ris; United States	Alan Ford; United States	Géza Kádas; Hungary
400 m freestyle	Bill Smith; United States	Jimmy McLane; France	John Marshall; Australia
1500 m freestyle	Jimmy McLane; United States	John Marshall; Australia	György Mitró; Hungary
100 m backstroke	Allen Stack; United States	Bob Cowell; United States	Georges Vallerey Jr. France
200 m breaststroke	Joe Verdeur; United States	Keith Carter; United States	Bob Sohl; United States
4 × 200 m freestyle relay	United States; Wally Ris; Jimmy McLane; Wally Wolf; Bill Smith; Bob Gibe; William Dudley; Edwin Gilbert; Eugene Rogers	Hungary; Elemér Szathmáry; György Mitró; Imre Nyéki; Géza Kádas	France; Jo Bernardo; René Cornu; Henri Padou Jr. Alexandre Jany

=== Women's events ===
Event	Gold	Silver	Bronze
100 m freestyle	Greta Andersen; Denmark	Ann Curtis; United States	Marie-Louise Linssen-Vaessen; Netherlands
400 m freestyle	Ann Curtis; United States	Karen Margrethe Harup; Denmark	Cathie Gibson; Great Britain
100 m backstroke	Karen Margrethe Harup; Denmark	Suzanne Zimmerman; United States	Judy-Joy Davies; Australia
200 m breaststroke	Nel van Vliet; Netherlands	Nancy Lyons; United States	Éva Gérard-Novák; Hungary
4 × 100 m freestyle relay	United States; Marie Corridon; Thelma Kalama; Brenda Helser; Ann Curtis	Denmark; Eva Arndt-Riise; Karen Margrethe Harup; Greta Andersen; Fritze Carstensen	Netherlands; Irma Heijting-Schuhmacher; Margot Marsman; Marie-Louise Linssen-Vaessen; Hannie Termeulen

== Water polo ==
Event	Gold	Silver	Bronze
Men's tournament	Italy; Pasquale Buonocore; Emilio Bulgarelli; Cesare Rubini; Geminio Ognio; Gildo Arena; Aldo Ghira; Gianfranco Pandolfini; Mario Maioni; Tullio Pandolfini	Hungary; Endre Győrfi; Miklós Holop; Dezső Gyarmati; Károly Szittya; Oszkár Csuvik; István Szivós Sr. Dezső Lemhényi; László Jeney; Dezső Fábián; Jenő Brandi	Netherlands; Joop Rohner; Nijs Korevaar; Cor Braasem; Hans Stam; Albert Ruimschotel; Ruud van Feggelen; Frits Smol; Piet Salomons; Hennie Keetelaar

== Weightlifting ==
Event	Gold	Silver	Bronze
Bantamweight –56 kg	Joe DePietro; United States	Julian Creus; Great Britain	Rich Tom; United States
Featherweight –60 kg	Mahmoud Fayad; Egypt	Rodney Wilkes; Trinidad and Tobago	Jafar Salmasi; Iran
Lightweight –67.5 kg	Ibrahim Hassanien Shams; Egypt	Attia Mohammed Hamouda; Egypt	Jim Halliday; Great Britain
Middleweight –75 kg	Frank Spellman; United States	Pete George; United States	Kim Seong-Jip; South Korea
Light-heavyweight –82.5 kg	Stan Stanczyk; United States	Harold Sakata; United States	Gösta Magnusson; Sweden
Heavyweight +82.5 kg	John Davis; United States	Norb Schemansky; United States	Bram Charité; Netherlands

== Wrestling ==
=== Greco-Roman ===
Event	Gold	Silver	Bronze
Flyweight (- 52 kg)	Pietro Lombardi; Italy	Kenan Olcay; Turkey	Reino Kangasmäki; Finland
Bantamweight (- 57 kg)	Kurt Pettersén; Sweden	Ali Mahmoud Hassan; Egypt	Halil Kaya; Turkey
Featherweight (- 62 kg)	Mehmet Oktav; Turkey	Olle Anderberg; Sweden	Ferenc Tóth; Hungary
Lightweight (- 67 kg)	Gustav Freij; Sweden	Aage Eriksen; Norway	Károly Ferencz; Hungary
Welterweight (- 73 kg)	Gösta Andersson; Sweden	Miklós Szilvási; Hungary	Henrik Hansen; Denmark
Middleweight (- 79 kg)	Axel Grönberg; Sweden	Muhlis Tayfur; Turkey	Ercole Gallegati; Italy
Light Heavyweight (- 87 kg)	Karl-Erik Nilsson; Sweden	Kelpo Gröndahl; Finland	Ibrahim Orabi; Egypt
Heavyweight (+ 87 kg)	Ahmet Kireççi; Turkey	Tor Nilsson; Sweden	Guido Fantoni; Italy

=== Freestyle ===
Event	Gold	Silver	Bronze
Flyweight (- 52 kg)	Lenni Viitala; Finland	Halit Balamir; Turkey	Thure Johansson; Sweden
Bantamweight (- 57 kg)	Nasuh Akar; Turkey	Gerald Leeman; United States	Charles Kouyos; France
Featherweight (- 62 kg)	Gazanfer Bilge; Turkey	Ivar Sjölin; Sweden	Adolf Müller; Switzerland
Lightweight (- 67 kg)	Celal Atik; Turkey	Gösta Frändfors; Sweden	Hermann Baumann; Switzerland
Welterweight (- 73 kg)	Yaşar Doğu; Turkey	Dick Garrard; Australia	Leland Merrill; United States
Middleweight (- 79 kg)	Glen Brand; United States	Adil Candemir; Turkey	Erik Lindén; Sweden
Light Heavyweight (- 87 kg)	Henry Wittenberg; United States	Fritz Stöckli; Switzerland	Bengt Fahlqvist; Sweden
Heavyweight (+ 87 kg)	Gyula Bóbis; Hungary	Bertil Antonsson; Sweden	Joseph Armstrong; Australia

== Multiple medalists ==
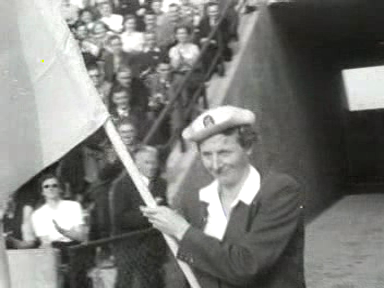
Fanny Blankers-Koen won the most gold medals of any athlete at the 1948 Summer Games.

Athletes who won at least two gold medals or three or more medals are listed below.

Athlete	Nation	Sport	Gold	Silver	Bronze	Total
Veikko Huhtanen	Finland	Gymnastics	3	1	1	5
Fanny Blankers-Koen	Netherlands	Athletics	4	0	0	4
Paavo Aaltonen	Finland	Gymnastics	3	0	1	4
Ann Curtis	United States	Swimming	2	1	0	3
Jimmy McLane	United States	Swimming	2	1	0	3
Humberto Mariles	Mexico	Equestrianism	2	0	1	3
Micheline Ostermeyer	France	Athletics	2	0	1	3
Mal Whitfield	United States	Athletics	2	0	1	3
Frank Henry	United States	Equestrianism	1	2	0	3
Michael Reusch	Switzerland	Gymnastics	1	2	0	3
Karen Margrethe Harup	Denmark	Swimming	1	2	0	3
Barney Ewell	United States	Athletics	1	2	0	3
Josef Stalder	Switzerland	Gymnastics	1	1	1	3
Ferenc Pataki	Hungary	Gymnastics	1	0	2	3
Walter Lehmann	Switzerland	Gymnastics	0	3	0	3
Edoardo Mangiarotti	Italy	Fencing	0	2	1	3
János Mogyorósi-Klencs	Hungary	Gymnastics	0	1	2	3
Shirley Strickland de la Hunty	Australia	Athletics	0	1	2	3
Gert Fredriksson	Sweden	Canoeing	2	0	0	2
Jéhan de Buhan	France	Fencing	2	0	0	2
Aladár Gerevich	Hungary	Fencing	2	0	0	2
Heikki Savolainen	Finland	Gymnastics	2	0	0	2
Vicki Draves	United States	Diving	2	0	0	2
Wally Ris	United States	Swimming	2	0	0	2
Bill Smith	United States	Swimming	2	0	0	2
Heikki Savolainen	Finland	Gymnastics	2	0	0	2
Roy Cochran	United States	Athletics	2	0	0	2
Harrison Dillard	United States	Athletics	2	0	0	2
Mel Patton	United States	Athletics	2	0	0	2

== See also ==
- 1948 Summer Olympics medal table
