= Fencing at the 1948 Summer Olympics =

Fencing at the Games of the XIV Olympiad

At the 1948 Summer Olympics, seven fencing events were contested, six for men and one for women.

== Medal summary ==
=== Men's events ===
Event	Gold	Silver	Bronze
individual épée	Luigi Cantone; Italy	Oswald Zappelli; Switzerland	Edoardo Mangiarotti; Italy
team épée	France; Maurice Huet; Michel Pécheux; Marcel Desprets; Edouard Artigas; Henri Guerin; Henri Lepage	Italy; Luigi Cantone; Marc Antonio Mandruzzato; Carlo Agostoni; Edoardo Mangiarotti; Fiorenzo Marini; Dario Mangiarotti	Sweden; Frank Cervell; Carl Forssell; Bengt Ljungquist; Sven Thofelt; Per Hjalmar Carleson; Arne Tollbom
individual foil	Jehan Buhan; France	Christian d'Oriola; France	Lajos Maszlay; Hungary
team foil	France; Adrien Rommel; Christian d'Oriola; Andre Bonin; Jacques Lataste; Jehan Buhan; René Bougnol	Italy; Saverio Ragno; Renzo Nostini; Manlio Di Rosa; Giorgio Pellini; Edoardo Mangiarotti; Giuliano Nostini	Belgium; André van de Werve de Vorsselaer; Paul Louis Jean Valcke; Raymond Bru; Georges Camille De Bourgignon; Henri Paternoster; Edouard Yves
individual sabre	Aladár Gerevich; Hungary	Vincenzo Pinton; Italy	Pál Kovács; Hungary
team sabre	Hungary; László Rajcsányi; Bertalan Papp; Aladár Gerevich; Tibor Berczelly; Rudolf Kárpáti; Pál Kovács	Italy; Carlo Turcato; Gastone Darè; Vincenzo Pinton; Mauro Racca; Renzo Nostini; Aldo Montano	United States; Miguel Angel De Capriles; Norman Cohn-Armitage; George Worth; Dean Victor Cetrulo; James Hummitzsch Flynn; Tibor Andrew Nyilas

=== Women's events ===
Event	Gold	Silver	Bronze
individual foil	Ilona Elek; Hungary	Karen Lachmann; Denmark	Ellen Mueller; Austria

== Medal table ==
Rank	Nation	Gold	Silver	Bronze	Total
1	France	3	1	0	4
2	Hungary	3	0	2	5
3	Italy	1	4	1	6
4	Denmark	0	1	0	1
4	Switzerland	0	1	0	1
6	Austria	0	0	1	1
6	Belgium	0	0	1	1
6	Sweden	0	0	1	1
6	United States	0	0	1	1
Totals (9 entries)		7	7	7	21

== Participating nations ==
A total of 294 fencers (255 men and 39 women) from 30 nations competed at the London Games:

- Argentina (19)
- Austria (7)
- Belgium (18)
- Brazil (7)
- Canada (6)
- Chile (3)
- Colombia (2)
- Cuba (6)
- Czechoslovakia (5)
- Denmark (15)
- Egypt (9)
- Finland (6)
- France (21)
- Great Britain (19)
- Greece (6)
- Hungary (18)
- Ireland (5)
- Italy (19)
- Luxembourg (6)
- Mexico (9)
- Netherlands (9)
- Norway (5)
- Peru (3)
- Poland (7)
- Portugal (6)
- Sweden (8)
- Switzerland (19)
- Turkey (6)
- United States (20)
- Uruguay (5)
