= France at the 1948 Summer Olympics =

- IOC code: FRA
- NOC: French Olympic Committee

in London
- Competitors: 316 (279 men and 37 women) in 20 sports
- Flag bearer: Jean Séphériadès
- Medals Ranked 3rd: Gold 10 Silver 6 Bronze 13 Total 29

Summer Olympics appearances (overview)
- 1896; 1900; ~~1904~~; 1908; 1912; 1920; 1924; 1928; 1932; 1936; 1948; 1952; 1956; 1960; 1964; 1968; 1972; 1976; 1980; 1984; 1988; 1992; 1996; 2000; 2004; 2008; 2012; 2016; 2020; 2024; 2028

Other related appearances
- 1906 Intercalated Games

France competed at the 1948 Summer Olympics in Wembley Park, London, England. 316 competitors, 279 men and 37 women, took part in 135 events in 20 sports.

== Medalists ==
Medal	Name	Sport	Event	Date
Gold	Micheline Ostermeyer	Athletics	Women's discus throw	30 July
Gold	André Bonin; René Bougnol; Jehan Buhan; Christian d'Oriola; Jacques Lataste; Adrien Rommel	Fencing	Men's team foil	31 July
Gold	Micheline Ostermeyer	Athletics	Women's shot put	4 August
Gold	Jehan Buhan	Fencing	Men's foil	4 August
Gold	Édouard Artigas; Marcel Desprets; Henri Guérin; Maurice Huet; Henri Lepage; Michel Pécheux	Fencing	Men's team épée	6 August
Gold	Pierre Adam; Serge Blusson; Charles Coste; Fernand Decanali	Cycling	Men's team pursuit	9 August
Gold	Maurice Buret; André Jousseaume; Jean Saint-Fort Paillard	Equestrian	Team dressage	9 August
Gold	Jacques Dupont	Cycling	Men's track time trial	11 August
Gold	José Beyaert	Cycling	Men's individual road race	13 August
Gold	Bernard Chevallier	Equestrian	Individual eventing	13 August
Silver	Alain Mimoun	Athletics	Men's 10,000 metres	30 July
Silver	Christian d'Oriola	Fencing	Men's foil	4 August
Silver	Ignace Heinrich	Athletics	Men's decathlon	6 August
Silver	Robert Chef d'Hôtel; Jean Kerebel; Jacques Lunis; Francis Schewetta	Athletics	Men's 4 × 400 metres relay	7 August
Silver	André Jousseaume	Equestrian	Individual dressage	10 August
Silver	France men's national basketball team: André Barrais; Michel Bonnevie; André Buffière; René Chocat; René Dérency; Maurice Desaymonnet; André Even; Maurice Girardot; Fernand Guillou; Raymond Offner; Jacques Perrier; Yvan Quénin; Lucien Rebuffic; Pierre Thiolon	Basketball	Men's tournament	14 August
Bronze	Jacqueline Mazéas	Athletics	Women's discus throw	30 July
Bronze	Charles Kouyos	Wrestling	Men's freestyle bantamweight	31 July
Bronze	Marcel Hansenne	Athletics	Men's 800 metres	2 August
Bronze	Joseph Bernardo; René Cornu; Alexandre Jany; Henri Padou Jr.	Swimming	Men's 4 × 200 metre freestyle relay	3 August
Bronze	Georges Vallerey	Swimming	Men's 100 metre backstroke	6 August
Bronze	Micheline Ostermeyer	Athletics	Women's high jump	7 August
Bronze	Georges Dransart; Georges Gandil	Canoeing	Men's C-2 10,000 metres	11 August
Bronze	Gaston Dron; René Faye	Cycling	Men's tandem	11 August
Bronze	Robert Boutigny	Canoeing	Men's C-1 1000 metres	12 August
Bronze	Georges Dransart; Georges Gandil	Canoeing	Men's C-2 1000 metres	12 August
Bronze	Henri Eberhardt	Canoeing	Men's K-1 1000 metres	12 August
Bronze	José Beyaert; Jacques Dupont; Alain Moineau	Cycling	Men's team road race	13 August
Bronze	Jean-François d'Orgeix	Equestrian	Individual jumping	14 August

== Athletics ==
Men
Track & road events

Athlete	Event	Heat		Quarterfinal		Semifinal		Final	
Athlete	Event	Result	Rank	Result	Rank	Result	Rank	Result	Rank
Jean-Claude Arifon	400 m hurdles	56.9	2 Q	—N/a		52.3	4	Did not advance	
Jacques André	400 m hurdles	54.5	2 Q	—N/a		56.3	6	Did not advance	
Étienne Bally	100 m	DNF		Did not advance					
Étienne Bally	200 m	NT	4	Did not advance					
Robert Chef d'Hôtel	800 m	1:56.2	2 Q	—N/a		1:52.0	2 Q	1:53.0	7
Roger Chesneau	3000 m steeplechase	9:27.6	4 Q	—N/a				9:30.2	11
Raymond Crapet	400 m	49.4	3	Did not advance					
Yves Cros	400 m hurdles	55.7	2 Q	—N/a		52.5	2 Q	53.3	5
Hugues Frayer	110 m hurdles	15.5	2 Q	—N/a		NT	6	Did not advance	
Alexandre Guyodo	3000 m steeplechase	9:17.2	2 Q	—N/a				9:13.6	4
Marcel Hansenne	800 m	1:54.6	1 Q	—N/a		1:50.5	1 Q	1:49.8	Bronze medal
Marcel Hansenne	1500 m	3:52.8	2 Q	—N/a				4:02.0	11
Henri Klein	1500 m	3:59.8	6	Did not advance					
Julien Lebas	200 m	22.0	1 Q	NT	5	Did not advance			
Jacques Lunis	400 m	49.3	1 Q	48.9	6	Did not advance			
André-Jacques Marie	110 m hurdles	14.4	1 Q	—N/a		DNF		Did not advance	
Gaston Mayordomo	800 m	1:55.7	4 Q	—N/a		1:54.3	4	Did not advance	
Alain Mimoun	10,000 m	—N/a						30:47.4	Silver medal
Alain Mimoun	5000 m	15:11.2	6	Did not advance					
Gilbert Omnès	110 m hurdles	15.2	3	Did not advance					
André Paris	10,000 m	—N/a						NT	NP
Maurice Pouzieux	5000 m	15:09.8	5	Did not advance					
Raphaël Pujazon	3000 m steeplechase	9:20.8	1 Q	—N/a				DNF	
Ben Saïd Abdallah	10,000 m	—N/a						31:07.8	6
Francis Schewetta	400 m	48.9	2 Q	49.9	5	Did not advance			
Joseph Stéphan	200 m	NT	5	Did not advance					
René Valmy	100 m	10.8	2	NT	4	Did not advance			
Jacques Vernier	1500 m	3:57.6	4	Did not advance					
Jacques Vernier	5000 m	15:29.8	5	Did not advance					
Julien Lebas; Marc Litaudon; Alain Porthault; René Valmy	4 × 100 m relay	DNF		Did not advance					
Robert Chef d'Hôtel; Jean Kerebel; Jacques Lunis; Francis Schewetta	4 × 400 m relay	3:17.0	2 Q	—N/a				3:14.8	Bronze medal

Field events

Athlete	Event	Qualification		Final	
Athlete	Event	Distance	Position	Distance	Position
Claude Bénard	High jump	1.84	21	Did not advance	
Robert Bobin	Triple jump	14.130	18	Did not advance	
Georges Breitman	Pole vault	3.90	13	Did not advance	
Georges Damitio	Long jump	6.980	12 q	7.070	6
Georges Damitio	High jump	1.87	1 Q	1.95	5
Charles Épalle	Triple jump	14.020	20	Did not advance	
Pierre Legrain	Hammer throw	47.60	18	Did not advance	
Victor Sillon	Pole vault	4.00	1 Q	3.95	9
Pierre Sprécher	Javelin throw	52.30	23	Did not advance	
Raymond Tissot	Javelin throw	58.19	14	Did not advance	

Women
Track & road events

Athlete	Event	Heat		Quarterfinal		Semifinal		Final	
Athlete	Event	Result	Rank	Result	Rank	Result	Rank	Result	Rank
Rosine Faugouin	200 m	25.9	2 Q	—N/a		25.3	5	Did not advance	
Jeanine Moussier	100 m	12.9	3	Did not advance					
Yvette Monginou	80 m hurdles	11.7	1 Q	—N/a		11.8	2 Q	11.8	4
Liliane Sprécher	200 m	26.0	2 Q	—N/a		25.1	6	Did not advance	
Jeanine Toulouse	80 m hurdles	12.0	3 Q	—N/a		NT	5	Did not advance	
Rosine Faugouin; Jeanine Moussier; Liliane Sprécher; Jeanine Toulouse	4 × 100 m relay	48.1	3	Did not advance					

Field events

Athlete	Event	Qualification		Final	
Athlete	Event	Distance	Position	Distance	Position
Yvonne Chabot-Curtet	Long jump	5.640 OR	1 Q	5.350	8
Anne-Marie Colchen	High jump	—N/a		1.40	14
Paulette Laurent	Shot put	?	11 Q	12.030	10
Marguerite Martel	Long jump	4.950	24	Did not advance	
Jacqueline Mazéas	Discus throw	—N/a		40.47	Bronze medal
Micheline Ostermeyer	High jump	—N/a		1.61	Bronze medal
Micheline Ostermeyer	Shot put	13.140 OR	1 Q	13.750 OR	Gold medal
Micheline Ostermeyer	Discus throw	—N/a		41.92	Gold medal
Simone Ruas	High jump	—N/a		1.50	9
Paulette Veste	Discus throw	—N/a		36.84	10

== Cycling ==
Eleven cyclists, all men, represented France in 1948.

Individual road race

- José Beyaert
- Alain Moineau
- Jacques Dupont
- René Rouffeteau

Team road race

- José Beyaert
- Alain Moineau
- Jacques Dupont
- René Rouffeteau

Sprint

- Jacques Bellenger

Time trial

- Jacques Dupont

Tandem

- René Faye
- Gaston Dron

Team pursuit

- Charles Coste
- Serge Blusson
- Fernand Decanali
- Pierre Adam

== Diving ==
Men

Athlete	Event	Final	
Athlete	Event	Points	Rank
Roger Heinkelé	3 m springboard	110.78	14
Guy Hernandez	3 m springboard	102.89	20
Raymond Mulinghausen	3 m springboard	126.55	5
Guy Hernandez	10 m platform	87.46	20
Raymond Mulinghausen	10 m platform	103.01	7

Women

Athlete	Event	Final	
Athlete	Event	Points	Rank
Jeannette Aubert	3 m springboard	86.96	10
Mady Moreau	3 m springboard	89.43	7
Nicole Péllissard	3 m springboard	100.38	4
Nicole Péllissard	10 m platform	61.07	6

== Fencing ==
21 fencers, 18 men and 3 women, represented France in 1948.

Men's foil

- Jéhan Buhan
- Christian d'Oriola
- René Bougnol

Men's team foil

- André Bonin, Jéhan Buhan, Jacques Lataste, René Bougnol, Christian d'Oriola, Adrien Rommel

Men's épée

- Henri Guérin
- Henri Lepage
- Marcel Desprets

Men's team épée

- Henri Guérin, Henri Lepage, Marcel Desprets, Michel Pécheux, Édouard Artigas, Maurice Huet

Men's sabre

- Jacques Lefèvre
- Jean Levavasseur
- Maurice Gramain

Men's team sabre

- Jean-François Tournon, Jacques Parent, Maurice Gramain, Jacques Lefèvre, Jean Levavasseur, Georges Lévêcque

Women's foil

- Renée Garilhe
- Louisette Malherbaud
- Françoise Gouny

== Modern pentathlon ==
Three male pentathletes represented France in 1948.

- André Lacroix
- Louis Pichon
- Christian Palant

== Rowing ==
France had 22 male rowers participate in six out of seven rowing events in 1948.

Men's single sculls

- Jean Séphériadès

Men's double sculls

- Jacques Maillet
- Christian Guilbert

Men's coxless pair

- Paul Rothley
- Paul Heitz

Men's coxed pair

- Ampelio Sartor
- Aristide Sartor
- Roger Crezen (cox)

Men's coxed four

- Jean-Paul Pieddeloup
- René Lotti
- Gaston Maquat
- Jean-Pierre Souche
- Marcel Boigegrain (cox)

Men's eight

- Pierre Fauveau
- Pierre Sauvestre
- Alphonse Bouton
- Erik Aschehoug
- Jean Bocahut
- René Boucher
- Pierre Clergerie
- Roger Lebranchu
- Robert Léon (cox)

== Shooting ==
Twelve shooters represented France in 1948.

25 metre pistol

- Charles des Jammonières
- R. Bouillet
- Didier Hesse

50 metre pistol

- Jacques Mazoyer
- Marcel Bonin
- R. Stéphan

300 metre rifle

- Jean Fournier
- Édouard Rouland
- Stéphane Lesceux

50 metre rifle

- Georges Gauthier-Lafond
- Lucien Genot
- M. Bouchez

== Swimming ==
Men

Athlete	Event	Heat		Semifinal		Final	
Athlete	Event	Time	Rank	Time	Rank	Time	Rank
Alex Jany	100 m freestyle	58.1	1 Q*	57.9	2 Q*	58.3	5
Fernand Martinaux	100 m freestyle	1:04.2	5*	Did not advance			
Henri Padou Jr.	100 m freestyle	1:01.5	3*	Did not advance			
Jo Bernardo	400 m freestyle	5:03.8	19	Did not advance			
René Cornu	400 m freestyle	5:05.2	21	Did not advance			
Alex Jany	400 m freestyle	4:53.3	5 Q	4:51.3	6 q	4:51.4	6
Jo Bernardo	1500 m freestyle	20:34.8	14 Q	20:25.5	9	Did not advance	
René Cornu	1500 m freestyle	21:01.6	22	Did not advance			
René Pirolley	100 m backstroke	1:11.4	2 Q*	1:12.9	8*	Did not advance	
Georges Vallerey	100 m backstroke	1:07.4	1 Q*	1:08.3	2*	1:07.8	3rd place, bronze medalist(s)
Lucien Zins	100 m backstroke	1:10.9	4 q*	1:11.5	6	Did not advance	
Maurice Lusien	200 m breaststroke	2:49.5	11 Q	2:51.4	12	Did not advance	
Artem Nakache	200 m breaststroke	2:50.4	12 Q	2:59.1	16	Did not advance	
René Cornu; Henri Padou Jr. Jo Bernardo; Alex Jany	4 × 200 m freestyle relay	9:08.8	1 Q*	—N/a		9:08.0	3rd place, bronze medalist(s)

*Ranks given are within the heat.

Women

Athlete	Event	Heat		Semifinal		Final	
Athlete	Event	Time	Rank	Time	Rank	Time	Rank
Josette Arène	100 m freestyle	1:09.7	17	Did not advance			
Ginette Jany-Sendral	100 m freestyle	1:12.1	23	Did not advance			
Gisèle Vallerey	100 m freestyle	1:14.0	29	Did not advance			
Colette Thomas	400 m freestyle	5:32.9	9 Q	5:35.3	9	Did not advance	
Monique Berlioux	100 m backstroke	1:18.8	10 Q	1:20.2	13	Did not advance	
Ginette Jany-Sendral	100 m backstroke	1:22.7	20	Did not advance			
Jacqueline Bertrand	200 m breaststroke	3:10.7	4 Q*	3:13.1	5*	Did not advance	
Josette Arène; Gisèle Vallerey; Colette Thomas; Ginette Jany-Sendral; Marie Foucher-Creteau	4 × 100 m freestyle relay	4:50.0	4 Q*	—N/a		4:49.8	7

*Ranks given are within the heat.
