= Italy at the 1948 Summer Olympics =

- IOC code: ITA
- NOC: Italian National Olympic Committee

in London, United Kingdom July 29–August 14, 1948
- Competitors: 215 (195 men, 20 women) in 16 sports
- Flag bearer: Giovanni Rocca
- Medals Ranked 5th: Gold 8 Silver 11 Bronze 8 Total 27

Summer Olympics appearances (overview)
- 1896; 1900; 1904; 1908; 1912; 1920; 1924; 1928; 1932; 1936; 1948; 1952; 1956; 1960; 1964; 1968; 1972; 1976; 1980; 1984; 1988; 1992; 1996; 2000; 2004; 2008; 2012; 2016; 2020; 2024; 2028

Other related appearances
- 1906 Intercalated Games

Italy competed at the 1948 Summer Olympics in London, England. 215 competitors, 195 men and 20 women, took part in 89 events in 16 sports.

== Medalists ==
Medal	Name	Sport	Event	Date
Gold	Adolfo Consolini	Athletics	Men's discus throw	2 August
Gold	Pietro Lombardi	Wrestling	Men's Greco-Roman flyweight	6 August
Gold	Italy men's national water polo team: Gildo Arena; Emilio Bulgarelli; Pasquale Buonocore; Aldo Ghira; Mario Majoni; Geminio Ognio; Gianfranco Pandolfini; Tullio Pandolfini; Cesare Rubini	Water polo	Men's tournament	7 August
Gold	Mario Ghella	Cycling	Men's sprint	9 August
Gold	Luigi Cantone	Fencing	Men's épée	9 August
Gold	Franco Faggi; Giovanni Invernizzi; Giuseppe Moioli; Elio Morille	Rowing	Men's coxless four	9 August
Gold	Renato Perona; Ferdinando Terruzzi	Cycling	Men's tandem	11 August
Gold	Ernesto Formenti	Boxing	Featherweight	13 August
Silver	Edera Gentile	Athletics	Women's discus throw	30 July
Silver	Manlio Di Rosa; Edoardo Mangiarotti; Giuliano Nostini; Renzo Nostini; Giorgio Pellini; Saverio Ragno	Fencing	Men's team foil	31 July
Silver	Giuseppe Tosi	Athletics	Men's discus throw	2 August
Silver	Amelia Piccinini	Athletics	Women's shot put	4 August
Silver	Carlo Agostoni; Luigi Cantone; Marco Antonio Mandruzzato; Dario Mangiarotti; Edoardo Mangiarotti; Fiorenzo Marini	Fencing	Men's team épée	6 August
Silver	Arnaldo Benfenati; Guido Bernardi; Anselmo Citterio; Rino Pucci	Cycling	Men's team pursuit	9 August
Silver	Alberto Radi; Giovanni Steffè; Aldo Tarlao	Rowing	Men's coxed pair	9 August
Silver	Gastone Darè; Aldo Montano; Renzo Nostini; Vincenzo Pinton; Mauro Racca; Carlo Turcato	Fencing	Men's team sabre	11 August
Silver	Spartaco Bandinelli	Boxing	Flyweight	12 August
Silver	Giovanni Zuddas	Boxing	Bantamweight	13 August
Silver	Vincenzo Pinton	Fencing	Men's sabre	11 August
Bronze	Ercole Gallegati	Wrestling	Men's Greco-Roman middleweight	6 August
Bronze	Guido Fantoni	Wrestling	Men's Greco-Roman heavyweight	6 August
Bronze	Carlo Monti; Enrico Perucconi; Antonio Siddi; Michele Tito	Athletics	Men's 4 × 100 metres relay	7 August
Bronze	Edoardo Mangiarotti	Fencing	Men's épée	9 August
Bronze	Alessandro D'Ottavio	Boxing	Welterweight	13 August
Bronze	Ivano Fontana	Boxing	Middleweight	13 August

== Athletics ==
=== Results ===
Men (17)
Athlete	Event	Rank	Medal
Salvatore Costantino	Men's Marathon	AC	
Ottavio Missoni	Men's 400 metres Hurdles	6	
Enrico Perucconi	Men's 4 × 100 metres Relay	3	Bronze
Antonio Siddi	Men's 4 × 100 metres Relay	3	Bronze
Carlo Monti	Men's 4 × 100 metres Relay	3	Bronze
Michele Tito	Men's 4 × 100 metres Relay	3	Bronze
Gianni Rocca	Men's 4 × 400 metres Relay	AC	
Ottavio Missoni	Men's 4 × 400 metres Relay	AC	
Luigi Paterlini	Men's 4 × 400 metres Relay	AC	
Antonio Siddi	Men's 4 × 400 metres Relay	AC	
Gianni Corsaro	Men's 10 kilometres Walk	8	
Pino Dordoni	Men's 10 kilometres Walk	9	
Salvatore Cascino	Men's 50 kilometres Walk	14	
Francesco Pretti	Men's 50 kilometres Walk	AC	
Valentino Bertolini	Men's 50 kilometres Walk	AC	
Adolfo Consolini	Men's Discus Throw	1	Gold
Giuseppe Tosi	Men's Discus Throw	2	Silver
Giorgio Oberweger	Men's Discus Throw	15 QR	
Teseo Taddia	Men's Hammer Throw	7	
Women (8)
Athlete	Event	Rank	Medal
Liliana Tagliaferri	Women's 100 metres	5 h1 r2/3	
Mirella Avalle	Women's 4 × 100 metres Relay	AC h2 r1/2	
Anna Maria Cantù	Women's 4 × 100 metres Relay	AC h2 r1/2	
Marcella Jeandeau	Women's 4 × 100 metres Relay	AC h2 r1/2	
Liliana Tagliaferri	Women's 4 × 100 metres Relay	AC h2 r1/2	
Silvana Pierucci	Women's Long Jump	14 QR	
Amelia Piccinini	Women's Shot Put	2	Silver
Edera Cordiale-Gentile	Women's Discus Throw	2	Silver
Gabre Gabric-Calvesi	Women's Discus Throw	17	

== Basketball ==
=== Men's team competition ===
- Team Roster

- Gianfranco Bersani
- Carlo Cerioni
- Federico Marietti
- Giancarlo Marinelli
- Giancarlo Primo
- Renzo Ranuzzi
- Luigi Rapini
- Romeo Romanutti
- Sergio Stefanini
- Vittorio Tracuzzi

== Cycling ==
Twelve cyclists, all men, represented Italy in 1948.

Individual road race

- Adolfo Ferrari
- Silvio Pedroni
- Franco Fanti
- Livio Isotti

Team road race

- Adolfo Ferrari
- Silvio Pedroni
- Franco Fanti
- Livio Isotti

Sprint

- Mario Ghella

Time trial

- Gino Guerra

Tandem

- Ferdinando Terruzzi
- Renato Perona

Team pursuit

- Arnaldo Benfenati
- Guido Bernardi
- Anselmo Citterio
- Rino Pucci

== Fencing ==
19 fencers, 16 men and 3 women, represented Italy in 1948.

Men's foil

- Manlio Di Rosa
- Renzo Nostini
- Giuliano Nostini

Men's team foil

- Edoardo Mangiarotti, Manlio Di Rosa, Renzo Nostini, Giuliano Nostini, Giorgio Pellini, Saverio Ragno

Men's épée

- Gino Cantone
- Edoardo Mangiarotti
- Carlo Agostoni

Men's team épée

- Edoardo Mangiarotti, Carlo Agostoni, Dario Mangiarotti, Gino Cantone, Marco Antonio Mandruzzato, Fiorenzo Marini

Men's sabre

- Vincenzo Pinton
- Gastone Darè
- Carlo Turcato

Men's team sabre

- Vincenzo Pinton, Gastone Darè, Carlo Turcato, Mauro Racca, Aldo Montano, Renzo Nostini

Women's foil

- Velleda Cesari
- Irene Camber-Corno
- Elena Libera

== Football ==
=== Men's team competition ===
- Team Roster

- Giuseppe Casari
- Guglielmo Giovannini
- Adone Stellin
- Tommaso Maestrelli
- Maino Neri
- Giacomo Mari
- Emidio Cavigioli
- Angelo Turconi
- Francesco Pernigo
- Valerio Cassani
- Emilio Caprile
- Glauco Vanz
- Franco Antonazzi
- Romolo Bizzoto
- Renzo Burini
- Egisto Pandolfini
- Cesare Presca
- Enzo Menegotto

== Gymnastics ==
Men's team competition

- Team roster

- Egidio Armelloni
- Guido Figone
- Danilo Fioravanti
- Domenico Grosso
- Savino Guglielmetti
- Ettore Perego
- Quinto Vadi
- Luigi Zanetti

Women's team competition

- Team roster

- Renata Bianchi
- Norma Icardi
- Licia Macchini
- Laura Micheli
- Wanda Nuti
- Luciana Pezzoni
- Elena Santoni
- Lilia Torriani

== Modern pentathlon ==
Three male pentathletes represented Italy in 1948.

- Giulio Palmonella
- Roberto Curcio
- Duilio Brignetti

== Rowing ==
Italy had 26 male rowers participate in all seven rowing events in 1948.

Men's single sculls

- Romolo Catasta

Men's double sculls

- Francesco Dapiran
- Mario Ustolin

Men's coxless pair

- Bruno Boni
- Felice Fanetti

Men's coxed pair

- Alberto Radi
- Giovanni Steffè
- Aldo Tarlao

Men's coxless four

- Franco Faggi
- Giovanni Invernizzi
- Giuseppe Moioli
- Elio Morille

Men's coxed four

- Domenico Cambieri
- Riccardo Cerutti
- Francesco Gotti
- Renato Macario
- Reginaldo Polloni

Men's eight

- Angelo Fioretti
- Mario Acchini
- Fortunato Maninetti
- Bonifacio De Bortoli
- Enrico Ruberti
- Pietro Sessa
- Ezio Acchini
- Luigi Gandini
- Alessandro Bardelli

== Shooting ==
Six shooters represented Italy in 1948.

25 metre pistol

- Michelangelo Borriello
- Walter Boninsegni
- Ferdinando Bernini

50 metre pistol

- Stefano Margotti

50 metre rifle

- Luigi Adami

== Water polo ==
=== Men's team competition ===
- Team Roster

- Ermenegildo Arena
- Pasquale Buonocore
- Emilio Bulgarelli
- Aldo Ghira
- Mario Maioni
- Germinio Ognio
- Gianfranco Pandolfini
- Tullio Pandolfini
- Cesare Rubini
