= Sweden at the 1948 Summer Olympics =

- IOC code: SWE
- NOC: Swedish Olympic Committee

in London
- Competitors: 181 (162 men and 19 women) in 18 sports
- Flag bearer: Per Carleson
- Medals Ranked 2nd: Gold 16 Silver 11 Bronze 17 Total 44

Summer Olympics appearances (overview)
- 1896; 1900; 1904; 1908; 1912; 1920; 1924; 1928; 1932; 1936; 1948; 1952; 1956; 1960; 1964; 1968; 1972; 1976; 1980; 1984; 1988; 1992; 1996; 2000; 2004; 2008; 2012; 2016; 2020; 2024; 2028

Other related appearances
- 1906 Intercalated Games

Sweden competed at the 1948 Summer Olympics in London, England. 181 competitors, 162 men and 19 women, took part in 100 events in 18 sports.

== Medalists ==
Medal	Name	Sport	Event	Date
Gold	John Ljunggren	Athletics	Men's 50 kilometres walk	31 July
Gold	Arne Åhman	Athletics	Men's triple jump	3 August
Gold	William Grut	Modern pentathlon	Men's individual	4 August
Gold	Tore Sjöstrand	Athletics	Men's 3000 metres steeplechase	5 August
Gold	Henry Eriksson	Athletics	Men's 1500 metres	6 August
Gold	Kurt Pettersén	Wrestling	Men's Greco-Roman bantamweight	6 August
Gold	Gustav Freij	Wrestling	Men's Greco-Roman lightweight	6 August
Gold	Gösta Andersson	Wrestling	Men's Greco-Roman welterweight	6 August
Gold	Axel Grönberg	Wrestling	Men's Greco-Roman middleweight	6 August
Gold	Karl-Erik Nilsson	Wrestling	Men's Greco-Roman light heavyweight	6 August
Gold	John Mikaelsson	Athletics	Men's 10 kilometres walk	7 August
Gold	Gert Fredriksson	Canoeing	Men's K-1 10000 metres	11 August
Gold	Hans Berglund; Lennart Klingström	Canoeing	Men's K-2 10000 metres	11 August
Gold	Gert Fredriksson	Canoeing	Men's K-1 1000 metres	12 August
Gold	Gunnar Åkerlund; Hans Wetterström	Canoeing	Men's K-2 1000 metres	12 August
Gold	Sweden men's national football team: Sune Andersson; Pär Bengtsson; Henry Carlsson; Rune Emanuelsson; Gunnar Gren; Egon Jönsson; Börje Leander; Nils Liedholm; Torsten Lindberg; Erik Nilsson; Stellan Nilsson; Bertil Nordahl; Gunnar Nordahl; Knut Nordahl; Stig Nyström; Kjell Rosén; Birger Rosengren; Kalle Svensson	Football	Men's tournament	13 August
Silver	Ivar Sjölin	Wrestling	Men's freestyle featherweight	31 July
Silver	Gösta Frändfors	Wrestling	Men's freestyle lightweight	31 July
Silver	Bertil Antonsson	Wrestling	Men's freestyle heavyweight	31 July
Silver	Erik Elmsäter	Athletics	Men's 3000 metres steeplechase	5 August
Silver	Lennart Strand	Athletics	Men's 1500 metres	6 August
Silver	Olle Anderberg	Wrestling	Men's Greco-Roman featherweight	6 August
Silver	Tor Nilsson	Wrestling	Men's Greco-Roman heavyweight	6 August
Silver	Ingemar Johansson	Athletics	Men's 10 kilometres walk	7 August
Silver	Folke Bohlin; Gösta Brodin; Hugo Johnson	Sailing	Dragon	12 August
Silver	Gunnar Nilsson	Boxing	Men's heavyweight	13 August
Silver	Robert Selfelt; Olof Stahre; Sigurd Svensson	Equestrian	Team eventing	13 August
Bronze	Bertil Albertsson	Athletics	Men's 10,000 metres	30 July
Bronze	Rune Larsson	Athletics	Men's 400 metres hurdles	31 July
Bronze	Thure Johansson	Wrestling	Men's freestyle flyweight	31 July
Bronze	Erik Lindén	Wrestling	Men's freestyle middleweight	31 July
Bronze	Bengt Fahlqvist	Wrestling	Men's freestyle light heavyweight	31 July
Bronze	Torsten Ullman	Shooting	Men's 50 metre pistol	2 August
Bronze	Jonas Jonsson	Shooting	Men's 50 metre rifle, prone position	3 August
Bronze	Ann-Britt Leyman	Athletics	Women's long jump	4 August
Bronze	Gösta Gärdin	Modern pentathlon	Men's individual	4 August
Bronze	Sven Lundquist	Shooting	25 metre rapid fire pistol	4 August
Bronze	Göte Hagström	Athletics	Men's 3000 metres steeplechase	5 August
Bronze	Per Hjalmar Carleson; Frank Cervell; Carl Forssell; Bengt Ljungquist; Sven Thofelt; Arne Tollbom	Fencing	Men's team épée	6 August
Bronze	Folke Alnevik; Rune Larsson; Kurt Lundquist; Lars-Erik Wolfbrandt	Athletics	Men's 4 × 400 metres relay	7 August
Bronze	Gustaf Adolf Boltenstern, Jr.	Equestrian	Individual dressage	10 August
Bronze	Gösta Magnusson	Weightlifting	Men's 82.5 kg	11 August
Bronze	Carl Robert Ameln; Martin Hindorff; Tore Holm; Torsten Lord; Gösta Salén	Sailing	Men's 6 metre class	12 August
Bronze	Robert Selfelt	Equestrian	Individual eventing	13 August

== Athletics ==
Men's 110 metres hurdles

- Håkan Lidman
- Börje Rendin

== Cycling ==
Four cyclists, all men, represented Sweden in 1948.

Individual road race

- Nils Johansson
- Harry Snell
- Åke Olivestedt
- Olle Wänlund

Team road race

- Nils Johansson
- Harry Snell
- Åke Olivestedt
- Olle Wänlund

== Diving ==
Men

Athlete	Event	Final	
Athlete	Event	Points	Rank
Svante Johansson	3 m springboard	120.20	6
Lennart Brunnhage	10 m platform	108.62	4

Women

Athlete	Event	Final	
Athlete	Event	Points	Rank
Eva Petersén	10 m platform	59.86	7

== Fencing ==
Eight fencers, all men, represented Sweden in 1948.

Men's foil

- Bo Eriksson
- Nils Rydström

Men's épée

- Bengt Ljungquist
- Frank Cervell
- Carl Forssell

Men's team épée

- Sven Thofelt, Per Carleson, Frank Cervell, Carl Forssell, Bengt Ljungquist, Arne Tollbom

Men's sabre

- Bo Eriksson

== Football ==
Summary

Key:

- W – Win D – Draw L – Loss
- A.E.T – After extra time.
- RP – Game replayed

Team	Event	Primary round	First round	Quarterfinal	Semifinal	Final / BM	
Team	Event	Opposition Score	Opposition Score	Opposition Score	Opposition Score	Opposition Score	Rank
Sweden men's	Men's tournament	Bye	Austria; W 3–0	South Korea; W 12–0	Denmark; W 4–2	Yugoslavia; W 3–1	1st place, gold medalist(s)

== Modern pentathlon ==
Three male pentathletes represented Sweden in 1948.

- Willie Grut
- Gösta Gärdin
- Sune Wehlin

== Rowing ==
Sweden had three male rowers participate in two out of seven rowing events in 1948.

Men's single sculls

- Curt Brunnqvist

Men's coxless pair

- Evert Gunnarsson
- Bernt Torberntsson

== Sailing ==
Thirteen Swedish sailor participated at the 1948 Summer Olympics.

Sweden had three reserves that did not participate in any events; Carl-Erik Ohlson, Charles Eriksson and Sven Rinman.

== Shooting ==
Eleven shooters represented Sweden in 1948.

25 metre pistol

- Sven Lundquist
- Torsten Ullman
- Claes Egnell

50 metre pistol

- Torsten Ullman
- Sture Nordlund
- Lars Berg

300 metre rifle

- Kurt Johansson
- Holger Erbén
- Walther Fröstell

50 metre rifle

- Jonas Jonsson
- Uno Berg
- Erland Koch

== Swimming ==
Men

Athlete	Event	Heat		Semifinal		Final	
Athlete	Event	Time	Rank	Time	Rank	Time	Rank
Olle Johansson	100 m freestyle	1:01.0	4*	Did not advance			
Martin Lundén	100 m freestyle	1:00.2	3 q*	1:00.2	6*	Did not advance	
Per-Olof Olsson	100 m freestyle	59.0	2 Q*	59.1	4 q*	59.3	6
Per-Olof Östrand	400 m freestyle	4:53.5	7 Q	DNS		Did not advance	
Per-Olof Östrand	1500 m freestyle	20:19.8	8 Q	DNS		Did not advance	
Martin Lundén	100 m backstroke	1:15.6	5*	Did not advance			
Per-Olof Olsson	100 m backstroke	1:14.6	6*	Did not advance			
Martin Lundén; Per-Olof Olsson; Per-Olof Östrand; Olle Johansson	4 × 200 m freestyle relay	9:12.9	3*	—N/a		9:09.1	4

*Ranks given are within the heat.

Women

Athlete	Event	Heat		Semifinal		Final	
Athlete	Event	Time	Rank	Time	Rank	Time	Rank
Elisabeth Ahlgren	100 m freestyle	1:08.7	12 Q	1:08.6	7 q	1:08.8	7
Ingegärd Fredin	100 m freestyle	1:08.1	6 Q	1:08.4	6 Q	1:08.4	5
Marianne Lundquist	100 m freestyle	1:09.0	14 Q	1:09.3	10	Did not advance	
Gisela Thidholm	400 m freestyle	5:34.5	10 Q	DNS		Did not advance	
Ingegärd Fredin	100 m backstroke	1:21.2	16 Q	DNS		Did not advance	
Gisela Thidholm; Elisabeth Ahlgren; Marianne Lundquist; Ingegärd Fredin	4 × 100 m freestyle relay	4:38.5	2 Q*	—N/a		DSQ	

*Rank given is within the heat.

== Water polo ==
Summary

Team	Event	Round one			Round two			Semifinal			Final		Rank
Team	Event	Opposition Result	Opposition Result	Rank	Opposition Result	Opposition Result	Rank	Opposition Result	Opposition Result	Rank	Opposition Result	Opposition Result	Rank
Sweden men	Men's tournament	Switzerland; W 6–1	Spain; W 4–1	1 Q	Belgium; D 1–1	United States; W 7–0	1 Q	Netherlands; L 3–5	—N/a	3	Egypt; W 3–2	France; D 1–1	5
