= Hordijk =

Hordijk is a Dutch surname. Notable people with the surname include:

- Cornelis Pijnacker Hordijk (1847–1908), Dutch jurist and politician
- Hendrik "Henk" Hordijk, (1893–1975), Dutch association football player
- Lisa Hordijk (born 1978), birth name of Lisa Lois, Dutch singer
- Roelof Hordijk (1917–1979), Dutch fencer
