= Henri Guérin =

Henri Guérin may refer to:

- Henri Guérin (fencer) (1905–1967), French Olympic fencer
- Henri Guérin (footballer) (1921–1995), French footballer
