= Alfred Eriksen (fencer) =

Norwegian fencer (1918–1991)

Personal information
- Nickname: Effen
- Born: 1 August 1918 Skien, Telemark, Norway
- Died: 27 April 1991 (aged 72) Oslo, Norway

Sport
- Sport: Fencing

Alfred "Effen" Eriksen (1 August 1918 – 27 April 1991) was a Norwegian fencer. He competed at the 1948 and 1952 Summer Olympics at ages 29 and 33 respectively. He qualified to the quarter finals for the Men's Team Épée in both competitions alongside Egill Knutzen, Johan von Koss, and Sverre Gillebo with Claus Mørch, Sr. in the 1948 games and Leif Klette in the 1952 games. He additionally reached the Men's Individual Épée quarter final in the 1948 Olympic Games but was eliminated in the first round of the 1952 Olympic Games in both the same event and the Men's Sabre Individual.
