= Gisèle Vallerey =

French swimmer

Personal information
- Born: 22 January 1930 Amiens, France
- Died: 28 September 2010 (aged 80) La Seyne-sur-Mer, France

Sport
- Sport: Swimming

Gisèle Vallerey (22 January 1930 – 28 September 2010) was a French swimmer. She competed in two events at the 1948 Summer Olympics.
