= Guy Hernandez =

French diver (1927–2020)

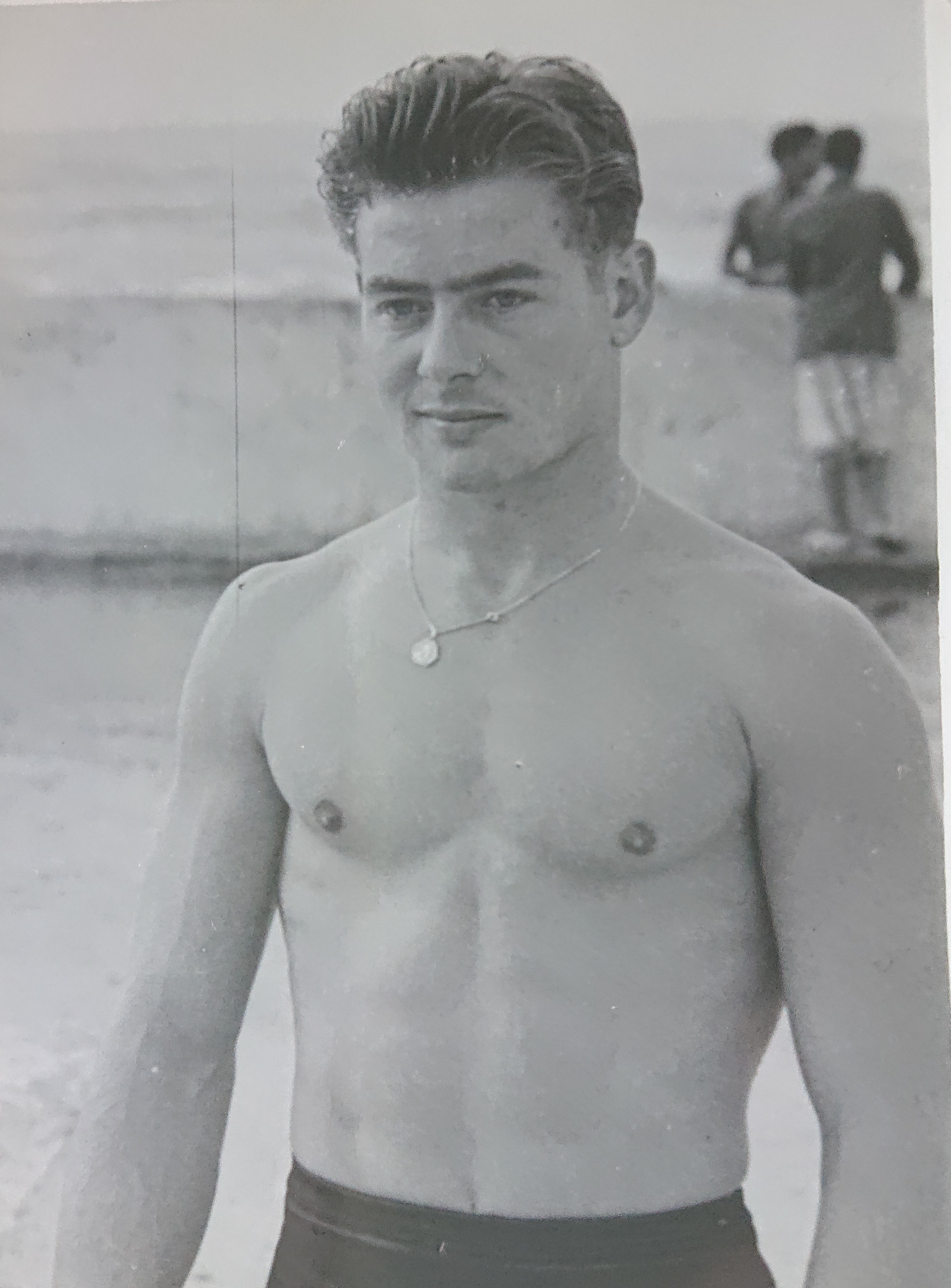

Personal information
- Nationality: French
- Born: 29 November 1927 Casablanca, Morocco
- Died: 22 October 2020 (aged 92)

Sport
- Sport: Diving
Medal record
Men's diving
Representing France
European Championships
Silver medal – second place	1950 Vienna	3 m springboard

Guy Hernandez (29 November 1927 – 22 October 2020) was a French diver. He competed in two events at the 1948 Summer Olympics.
