= Jeanine Moussier =

French sprinter (1930–2024)

Personal information
- Nationality: French
- Born: 8 April 1930 Lyon, France
- Died: 22 April 2024 (aged 94)

Sport
- Sport: Sprinting
- Event: 100 metres

Jeanine Journeaux (née Moussier; 8 April 1930 – 22 April 2024) was a French sprinter. She competed in the women's 100 metres at the 1948 Summer Olympics and 4 x 100 metres relay. Moussier died on 22 April 2024, at the age of 94.
