= Raymond Mulinghausen =

French diver

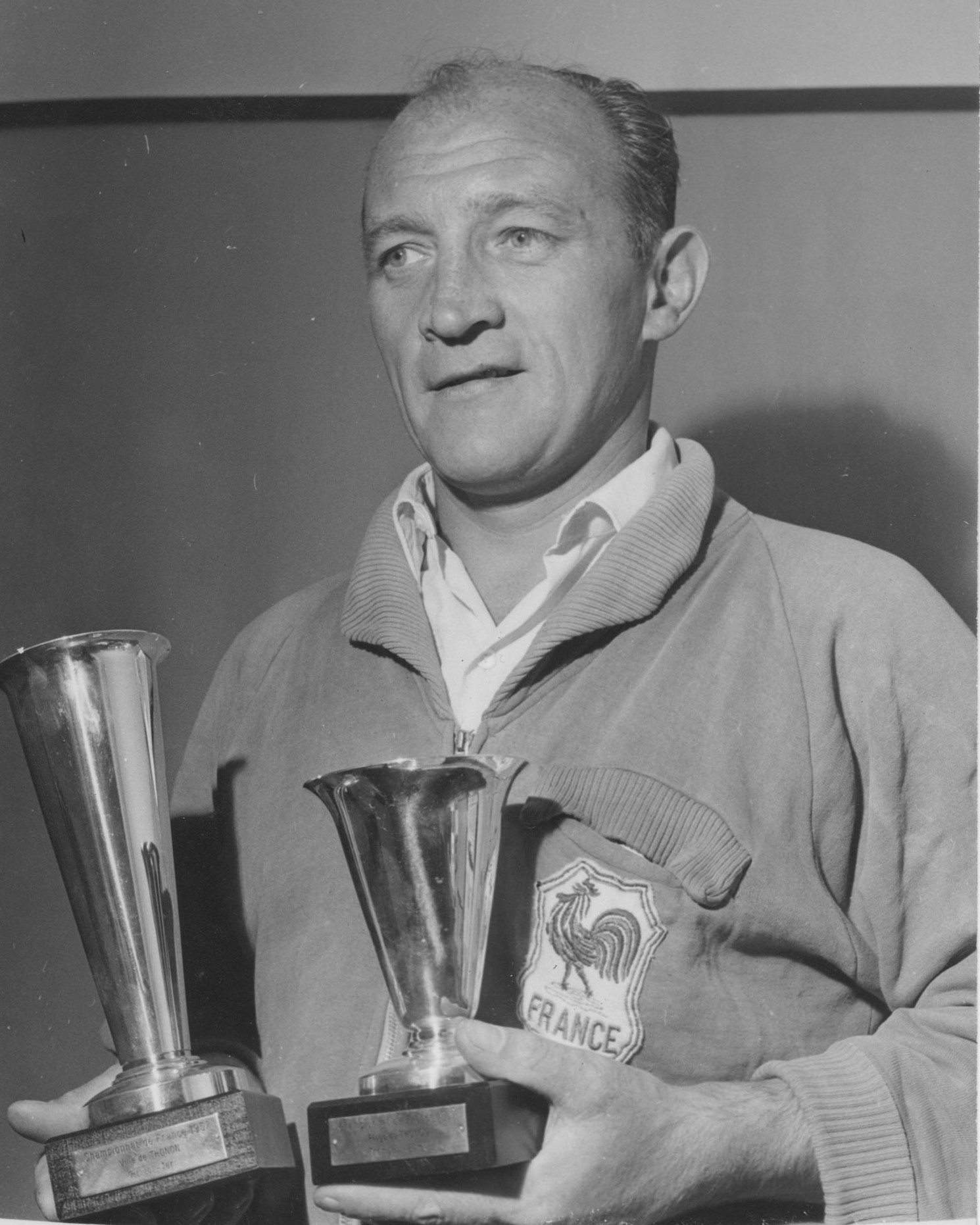
- Raymond Mulinghausen in 1960

Personal information
- Nationality: French
- Born: 3 September 1920; Paris, France
- Died: 19 February 2009 (aged 88); Bobigny, France

Sport
- Sport: Diving

Raymond Mulinghausen (3 September 1920 – 19 February 2009) was a French diver. He competed at the 1948 Summer Olympics and the 1952 Summer Olympics.
