= Rodolphe Spillmann =

Swiss fencer

Personal information
- Born: 25 October 1895 La Chaux-de-Fonds, Switzerland
- Died: 28 February 1981 (aged 85) La Chaux-de-Fonds, Switzerland

Sport
- Sport: Fencing

Rodolphe Spillmann (25 October 1895 – 28 February 1981) was a Swiss fencer. He competed in the individual épée event at the 1948 Summer Olympics.
