= Paul Anen =

Luxembourgish fencer (1918–1978)

Personal information
- Born: 3 February 1918 Niederkorn, Luxembourg
- Died: 29 May 1978 (aged 60) Differdange, Luxembourg

Sport
- Sport: Fencing

Paul Anen (3 February 1918 – 29 May 1978) was a Luxembourgish épée fencer. He competed at the 1948 and 1952 Summer Olympics.
