= Gösta Brodin =

Swedish sailor (1908–1979)

Olympic medal record

Sailing
| Silver medal – second place | 1948 London | Dragon class |

Frans Gösta Brodin (15 February 1908 – 18 June 1979) was a Swedish sailor who competed in the 1948 Summer Olympics.

In 1948 he won the silver medal as a crew member of the Swedish boat Slaghöken in the Dragon class.
