= René Cornu =

French swimmer (1929–1986)

Personal information
- Born: April 11, 1929
- Died: March 23, 1986 (aged 56)

Sport
- Sport: Swimming
Medal record
Representing France
Olympic Games
Bronze medal – third place	1948 London	4x200 m freestyle relay

René Cornu (11 April 1929 – 23 March 1986) was a French swimmer who competed in the 1948 Summer Olympics.
