= Gösta Magnusson =

Swedish weightlifter (1915–1948)

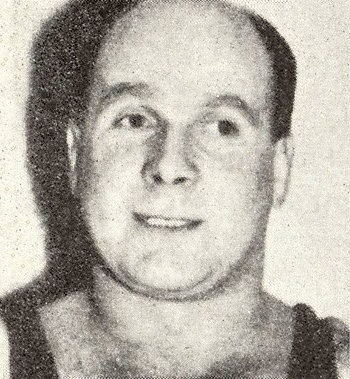

Personal information
- Born: 13 September 1915 Örebro, Sweden
- Died: 25 November 1948 (aged 33) Örebro, Sweden

Sport
- Sport: Weightlifting
- Club: Örebro AK
Medal record
Representing Sweden
Olympic Games
Bronze medal – third place	1948 London	Light heavyweight
European Weightlifting Championships
Gold medal – first place	1948 London	Light heavyweight

Klas Gösta Natanael Magnusson (13 September 1915 – 25 November 1948) was a Swedish light heavyweight weightlifter. In 1948 he won a European title and a bronze Olympic medal 1948 Summer Olympics in London. An avid ice angler, Magnusson drowned later that year after stepping on weak ice in his home district.
