= Sverre Gillebo =

Norwegian fencer

Personal information
- Born: 9 December 1912 Oslo, Norway
- Died: 24 May 1971 (aged 58) Oslo, Norway

Sport
- Sport: Fencing

Sverre Gillebo (9 December 1912 – 24 May 1971) was a Norwegian épée fencer. He competed at the 1948 and 1952 Summer Olympics.
