= Georges Gandil =

French canoeist

Olympic medal record

Men's canoe sprint
Bronze medal – third place	1948 London	C-2 1000 m
Bronze medal – third place	1948 London	C-2 10000 m

Georges Gandil (18 May 1926 – 24 October 1999) was a French sprint canoeist who competed in the late 1940s. He won two bronze medals at the 1948 Summer Olympics in London, earning them in the C-2 1000 m and C-2 10000 m events.
