= Nils Sjöblom =

Finnish fencer

Personal information
- Born: 29 January 1910 Helsinki, Finland
- Died: 11 May 1993 (aged 83) Helsinki, Finland

Sport
- Sport: Fencing

Nils Sjöblom (29 January 1910 – 11 May 1993) was a Finnish épée, foil and sabre fencer. He competed at the 1948 and 1952 Summer Olympics.
