= Ilmari Vartia =

Finnish fencer (1914–1951)

Personal information
- Born: 25 August 1914 Jyväskylä, Finland
- Died: 25 May 1951 (aged 36) Stockholm, Sweden

Sport
- Sport: Fencing

Ilmari Vartia (25 August 1914 – 25 May 1951) was a Finnish fencer. He competed in the individual and team épée events at the 1948 Summer Olympics. He died as a result of a wound sustained during a competition in 1951.
