= Roberto Mañalich =

Cuban fencer

Personal information
- Full name: Roberto Mañalich Alfonso
- Born: 4 March 1906 Havana, Cuba

Sport
- Sport: Fencing
Medal record
Men's fencing
Representing Cuba
Pan American Games
| Bronze medal – third place | 1951 Buenos Aires | Team épée |

Roberto Mañalich Alfonso (born 4 March 1906, date of death unknown) was a Cuban fencer. He competed in the individual and team épée and individual sabre events at the 1948 Summer Olympics.
