= Jean Asfar =

Egyptian fencer

Jean-Gabriel Asfar
Personal information
- Born: 16 November 1917 Cairo, Egypt
- Died: 19 October 2010 (aged 92) Paris, France

Sport
- Sport: Fencing
Medal record
Mediterranean Games
Bronze medal – third place	1955 Barcelona	Team épée

Jean-Gabriel Asfar (16 November 1917 – 19 October 2010) was an Egyptian fencer. He competed in the individual and team épée events at the 1948 Summer Olympics. He also competed at the 1955 Mediterranean Games where he won a bronze medal in the team épée event.
