= Béla Mikla =

Hungarian fencer (1921–2013)

Personal information
- Born: 6 November 1921 Budapest, Hungary
- Died: 29 October 2013 (aged 91)

Sport
- Sport: Fencing

Béla Mikla (6 November 1921 — 29 October 2013) was a Hungarian fencer. He competed in the individual and team épée events at the 1948 Summer Olympics.
