= Emílio Lino =

Portuguese fencer

Personal information
- Born: 8 June 1916 São Mamede (Lisbon), Portugal
- Died: 3 March 1958 (aged 41) Lapa, Lisbon, Portugal

Sport
- Sport: Fencing

Emílio Lino (8 June 1916 – 3 March 1958) was a Portuguese fencer. He competed in the individual and team épée events at the 1948 Summer Olympics.
