= Norman Lewis (fencer) =

American fencer (1915–2006)

Personal information
- Born: December 10, 1915 New York City, U.S.
- Died: June 6, 2006 (aged 90)

Sport
- Country: United States
- Sport: Fencing
- Event(s): épée and foil
- College team: New York University
- Club: Salle Santelli

Norman Lewis (December 10, 1915 – June 6, 2006) was an American Olympic épée fencer, who also competed in foil.

== Early and personal life ==
Lewis was born in New York City, and was Jewish. He later lived in Kew Gardens, New York, and on Candlewood Lake in Connecticut. He and his wife Eva had two daughters, Susan and Joan.

== Fencing career ==
Lewis fenced for New York University, for whom Lewis was Intercollegiate Fencing Association (IFA) foil champion (1935, 1936, 1937) and épée champion (1937), and his fencing club was Salle Santelli.

He won the Amateur Fencers League of America (AFLA)/AAU United States National Fencing Championship in foil in 1939, and in épée in 1948, 1949, and 1950.

Lewis competed in the individual (coming in 9th, despite defeating both the Swiss silver medalist Oswald Zappelli and the Italian bronze medalist Edoardo Mangiarotti) and team épée events at the 1948 Summer Olympics in London. He served as captain of the US fencing team at the 1968 Summer Olympics.

He later served as President of the Amateur Fencers League of America from 1965 to 1968, and as Chairman of the U.S. Olympic Games Fencing Committee.

Lewis is a member of the US Fencing Hall of Fame. In 1982, he was inducted into the New York University Sport Hall of Fame.

== See also ==
- List of USFA Division I National Champions
- List of USFA Hall of Fame members
