= Carlos Lamar =

Cuban fencer

Personal information
- Full name: Carlos Arturo Lamar Schweyer
- Born: 14 December 1908 Matanzas, Cuba

Sport
- Sport: Fencing
Medal record
Men's fencing
Representing Cuba
Pan American Games
Bronze medal – third place	1951 Buenos Aires	Team épée

Carlos Arturo Lamar Schweyer (born 14 December 1908, date of death unknown) was a Cuban fencer. He competed in the individual and team épée events at the 1948 Summer Olympics.
