= Emilio Meraz =

Mexican fencer (born 1906)

Personal information
- Born: 22 May 1906

Sport
- Sport: Fencing

Emilio Meraz (born 22 May 1906, date of death unknown) was a Mexican épée fencer. He competed at the 1948 and 1952 Summer Olympics.
