= Imre Hennyei =

Hungarian fencer (1913–1989)

Personal information
- Born: 14 July 1913 Kotor, Montenegro
- Died: 6 September 1989 (aged 76) Toronto, Ontario, Canada

Sport
- Sport: Fencing

Imre Hennyei (14 July 1913 – 6 September 1989) was a Hungarian épée fencer. He competed at the 1948 and 1952 Summer Olympics.
