= Rajmund Karwicki =

Polish fencer (1906–1979)

Personal information
- Born: 15 August 1906 Szopinek, Russian Empire
- Died: 9 February 1979 (aged 72) Mysłowice, Poland

Sport
- Sport: Fencing

Rajmund Karwicki (15 August 1906 – 9 February 1979) was a Polish fencer. He competed at the 1936 and 1948 Summer Olympics.
