= Pál Dunay =

Hungarian fencer

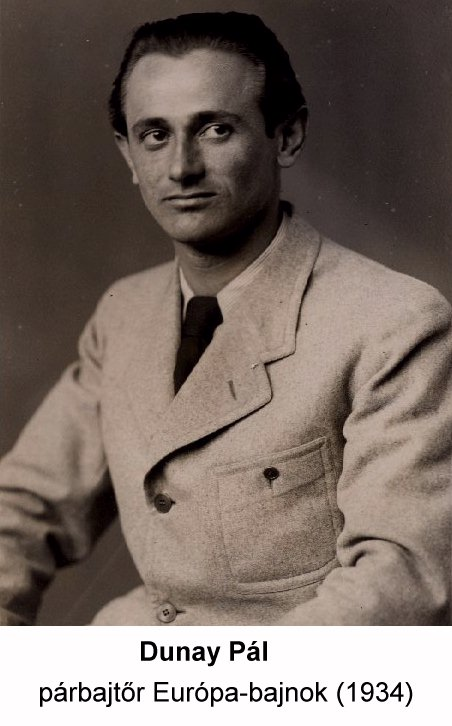

Personal information
- Born: 12 June 1909 Asbach, Germany
- Died: 17 July 1993 (aged 84) Budapest, Hungary

Sport
- Sport: Fencing

Pál Dunay (12 June 1909 – 17 July 1993) was a Hungarian épée and foil fencer. He competed at the 1936 and 1948 Summer Olympics. He was a 14-time national champion and was also a European champion and the 1934 world epee champion.
