= Alf Horn =

Canadian fencer

Personal information
- Born: 6 January 1913 Spjelkavik, Norway
- Died: 5 April 1991 (aged 78)

Sport
- Sport: Fencing

Alf Horn (6 January 1913 – 5 April 1991) was a Canadian épée, foil and sabre fencer. He competed in five events at the 1948 Summer Olympics.
