= Ib Nielsen =

Danish fencer

Personal information
- Born: 13 July 1919 Højby, Denmark
- Died: 21 November 1994 (aged 75) Copenhagen, Denmark

Sport
- Sport: Fencing

Ib Nielsen (13 July 1919 – 21 November 1994) was a Danish épée fencer. He competed at the 1948 and 1952 Summer Olympics.
