= Mario Biancalana =

Brazilian fencer (1902–1990)

Miguel Biancalana
Personal information
- Born: 14 September 1902 São Paulo, Brazil
- Died: 16 April 1990 (aged 87) São Paulo, Brazil

Sport
- Sport: Fencing
- Club: Sociedade Esportiva Palmeiras

Miguel Biancalana (14 September 1902 – 16 April 1990) was a Brazilian fencer. He competed in the individual and team épée events at the 1948 Summer Olympics.
