= Raúl Saucedo =

Argentine fencer (1904–1966)

Personal information
- Born: 12 September 1904 Posadas, Misiones, Argentina
- Died: 21 February 1966 (aged 61) Buenos Aires, Argentina
- Height: 178 cm (5 ft 10 in)

Sport
- Sport: Fencing
Medal record
Men's fencing
Representing Argentina
Pan American Games
Gold medal – first place	1951 Buenos Aires	Team épée
Silver medal – second place	1951 Buenos Aires	Team foil

Raúl Saucedo (12 September 1904 – 21 February 1966) was an Argentine fencer. He competed at the 1932, 1936 and 1948 Summer Olympics.
