= Albert Pelling =

British fencer (1903–1977)

Personal information
- Full name: Albert Edward Pelling
- Nickname: Bert
- Born: 18 October 1903 Wandsworth, England
- Died: 27 April 1977 (aged 73) Bournemouth, England

Sport
- Sport: Fencing

Albert Edward Pelling (18 October 1903 – 27 April 1977) was a British fencer. He competed at the 1936 and 1948 Summer Olympics. He was a three times British fencing champion, winning the épée title at the British Fencing Championships in 1933, 1934 and 1951.
