= Fortunato de Barros =

Brazilian fencer

Personal information
- Born: 17 April 1916
- Died: 7 February 1985 (aged 68)

Sport
- Sport: Fencing

Fortunato de Barros (17 April 1916 – 7 February 1985) was a Brazilian fencer. He competed in the individual and team épée events at the 1948 Summer Olympics.
