= Jean-Marie Radoux =

Belgian fencer (1906–1984)

Personal information
- Born: Jean-Marie Nicolas Radoux; 3 February 1906 Marchiennes, France
- Died: 11 June 1984 (aged 78) Namur, Belgium

Sport
- Sport: Fencing

Jean-Marie Nicolas Radoux (3 February 1906 – 11 June 1984 was a Belgian fencer. He competed in the individual and team épée events at the 1948 Summer Olympics. Radoux died in Namur on 11 June 1984, at the age of 78.
