= Raoul Henkart =

Belgian fencer

Personal information
- Born: 11 June 1907 Brussels, Belgium
- Died: 13 February 1955 (aged 47)

Sport
- Sport: Fencing

Raoul Henkart (11 June 1907 – 13 February 1955) was a Belgian fencer. He competed at the 1932 and 1948 Summer Olympics.
