= Vito Simonetti =

Argentine fencer

Personal information
- Full name: Vito Simonetti de Mare
- Born: 26 March 1903 Buenos Aires, Argentina

Sport
- Sport: Fencing
Medal record
Men's fencing
Representing Argentina
Pan American Games
Gold medal – first place	1951 Buenos Aires	Team épée

Vito Simonetti de Mare (born 26 March 1903, date of death unknown) was an Argentine fencer. He competed at the 1948 and 1952 Summer Olympics.
