= Roelof Hordijk =

Dutch fencer (1917–1979)

Personal information
- Born: 2 May 1917 Jawa Tengah, Indonesia
- Died: 4 July 1979 (aged 62) Niedersachsen, Germany

Sport
- Sport: Fencing

Roelof Hordijk (2 May 1917 – 4 July 1979) was a Dutch fencer. He competed in the individual épée event at the 1948 Summer Olympics.
