= Lucien Rebuffic =

French basketball player

Olympic medal record

Men's basketball
Silver medal – second place	1948 London	Team competition

Lucien Rebuffic (22 December 1924 – 4 January 1997) was a French basketball player who competed in the 1948 Summer Olympics. He was part of the French basketball team, which won the silver medal.
