= Luigi Cantone =

Italian fencer (1917–1997)

Medal record

Representing Italy

Men's Fencing

Olympic Games
| Gold medal – first place | 1948 London | Épée Individual |
| Silver medal – second place | 1948 London | Épée Team |

Luigi Cantone (July 21, 1917 – November 6, 1997) was an Italian fencer and Olympic champion in épée competition.

He received a gold medal in épée individual at the 1948 Summer Olympics in London. He received a silver medal in épée team.
