= Egill Knutzen =

Norwegian fencer

Personal information
- Born: 28 April 1914 Oslo, Norway
- Died: 6 March 1990 (aged 75) Akershus, Norway

Sport
- Sport: Fencing

Egill Knutzen (28 April 1914 – 6 March 1990) was a Norwegian épée fencer. He competed at the 1936, 1948 and 1952 Summer Olympics.

== Awards ==
- (Sweden) Swedish Fencing Federation Royal Medal of Merit in gold (Svenska fäktförbundets kungliga förtjänstmedalj i guld) (1986)
