= Marco Antonio Mandruzzato =

Italian fencer (1923–1969)

Personal information
- Born: 16 May 1923
- Died: 31 October 1969 (aged 46)

Sport
- Sport: Fencing
Medal record
Men's fencing
Representing Italy
Olympic Games
Silver medal – second place	1948 London	Épée, team

Marco Antonio Mandruzzato (16 May 1923 – 31 October 1969) was an Italian fencer. He won a silver medal in the team épée event at the 1948 Summer Olympics.
