= Maurice Huet =

French fencer (1918–1991)

Personal information
- Born: 1 December 1918 Paris, France
- Died: 8 June 1991 (aged 72) Tours, France

Sport
- Sport: Fencing
Medal record
Men's fencing
Representing France
Olympic Games
Gold medal – first place	1948 London	Épée, team

Maurice Huet (1 December 1918 – 8 June 1991) was a French fencer. He won a gold medal in the team épée event at the 1948 Summer Olympics.
