= Renzo Nostini =

Italian fencer (1914–2005)

Personal information
- Born: 27 May 1914 Rome, Italy
- Died: 30 September 2005 (aged 91) Rome, Italy

Sport
- Sport: Fencing
Medal record
Men's fencing
Representing Italy
Olympic Games
| Silver medal – second place | 1948 London | Foil, team |
| Silver medal – second place | 1948 London | Sabre, team |
| Silver medal – second place | 1952 Helsinki | Foil, team |
| Silver medal – second place | 1952 Helsinki | Sabre, team |

Renzo Nostini (27 May 1914 – 30 September 2005) was an Italian fencer. He won four silver medals, two at the 1948 Summer Olympics and two more at the 1952 Summer Olympics.

== See also ==
- Italy national fencing team - Multiple medallist
