= André Bonin =

French fencer (1909–1998)

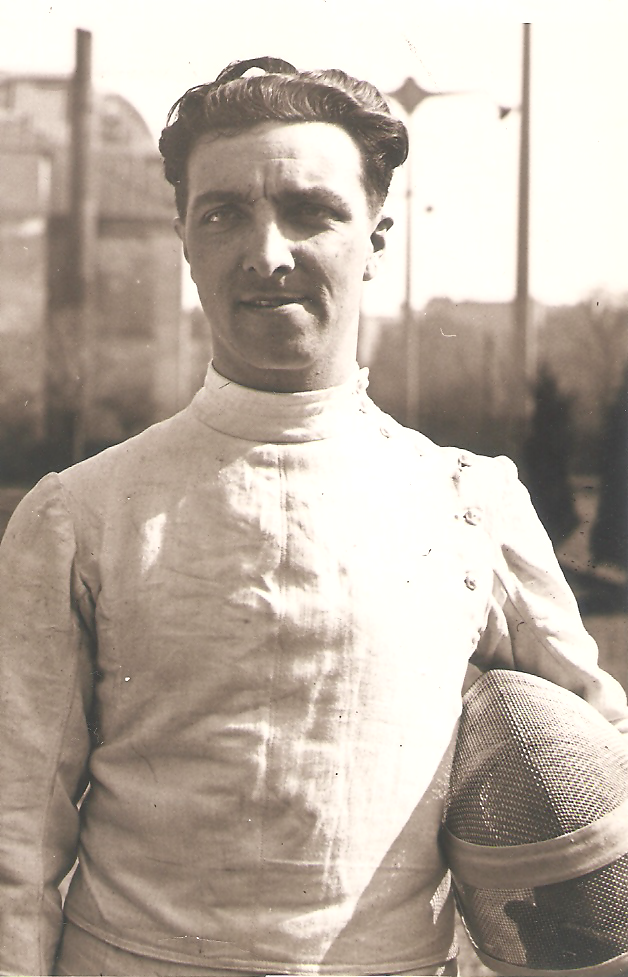

Personal information
- Born: 10 March 1909
- Died: 7 September 1998 (aged 89)

Sport
- Sport: Fencing
Medal record
Men's fencing
Representing France
Olympic Games
Gold medal – first place	1948 London	Foil, team

André Bonin (10 March 1909 – 7 September 1998) was a French fencer. He won a gold medal in the team foil event at the 1948 Summer Olympics.
