= Giorgio Pellini =

Italian fencer (1923–1986)

Personal information
- Born: 20 July 1923 Livorno, Italy
- Died: 14 June 1986 (aged 62) Livorno, Italy

Sport
- Sport: Fencing
Medal record
Men's fencing
Representing Italy
Olympic Games
Silver medal – second place	1948 London	Foil, team
Silver medal – second place	1952 Helsinki	Foil, team
Silver medal – second place	1952 Helsinki	Sabre, team
Mediterranean Games
Silver medal – second place	1955 Barcelona	Team foil

Giorgio Pellini (20 July 1923 – 14 June 1986) was an Italian fencer. He won three silver medals, one at the 1948 Summer Olympics and two more at the 1952 Summer Olympics. He also competed at the 1955 Mediterranean Games where he won a silver medal in the team foil event.
