= Arne Tollbom =

Swedish fencer

Personal information
- Born: 20 March 1911 Helsinki, Finland
- Died: 16 November 1971 (aged 60) Stockholm, Sweden

Sport
- Sport: Fencing
Medal record
Men's fencing
Representing Sweden
Olympic Games
Bronze medal – third place	1948 London	Épée, team

Arne Tollbom (20 March 1911 – 16 November 1971) was a Swedish fencer. He won a bronze medal in the team épée event at the 1948 Summer Olympics.
