= Fiorenzo Marini =

Italian fencer (1914–1991)

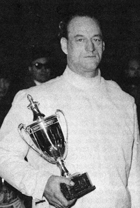

Personal information
- Born: 14 March 1914 Vienna, Austria
- Died: 19 January 1991 (aged 76) Chieri, Italy

Sport
- Sport: Fencing
Medal record
Men's fencing
Representing Italy
Olympic Games
Silver medal – second place	1948 London	Épée, team
Gold medal – first place	1960 Rome	Épée, team

Fiorenzo Marini (14 March 1914 – 19 January 1991) was an Italian fencer. He won a silver medal in the team épée event at the 1948 Summer Olympics and a gold in the same event at the 1960 Summer Olympics.
