= Bengt Ljungquist =

Swedish fencer and equestrian

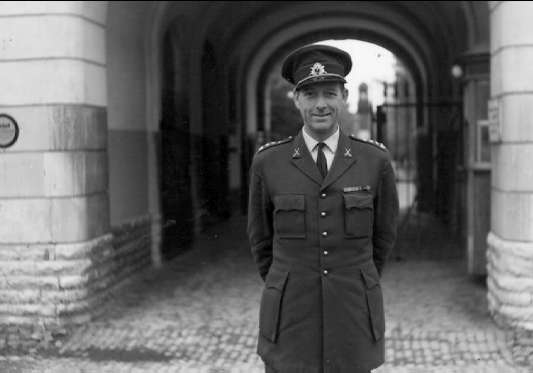
- Ljungquist at his retirement in 1967.
- Born: Bengt Helge Ljungquist; 20 September 1912; Umeå, Sweden
- Died: 15 July 1979 (aged 66); Förslöv, Sweden
- Military career
- Allegiance: Sweden (1936–1967); Ethiopia (1948–50)
- Branch: Swedish Army
- Service years: 1936–1967
- Rank: Colonel
- Commands: Swedish Cavalry Cadet School; Life Guards Squadron; Life Regiment Hussars
- Conflicts: Winter War

Bengt Helge Ljungquist (20 September 1912 – 15 July 1979) was a Swedish fencer, equestrian and military officer.

== Early life ==
Ljungquist was born on 20 September 1912 in Umeå, Sweden, the son of Major Helge Ljungquist and his wife Edith Palander. Ljungquist began riding at the age of ten. He passed studentexamen in Stockholm in 1931.

== Career ==
=== Military career ===
In 1934 he received his cavalry commission, which he resigned in 1939, along with many of his fellow officers, to fight in the Winter War for Finland in its two-year conflict with the invading Soviet Union. Ljungquist also attended the Royal Swedish Army Staff College between 1938 and 1940 and then served as a General Staff Corps aspirant. Ljungquist was promoted to lieutenant in the Life Regiment Hussars (K 3) in 1936 and became ryttmästare in 1943. He then served as a teacher at Military Academy Karlberg from 1944 to 1948 and as a military instructor in Ethiopia from 1948 to 1950. Ljungquist was commanding officer of the Swedish Cavalry Cadet School (Kavalleriets kadettskola, KavKS) from 1950 to 1954 when he was promoted to major. In 1955, he was appointed executive officer of the Life Guards Squadron (K 1). As part of his military duties, Ljungquist organized the equestrian competition at the 1956 Stockholm Olympic Games. Four years later, Ljungquist was promoted to lieutenant colonel and appointed executive officer of the Life Regiment Hussars (K 3). He retired from the military in 1967 and was given a tombstone promotion to colonel the same year.

=== Sports career ===
Bengt Ljungquist
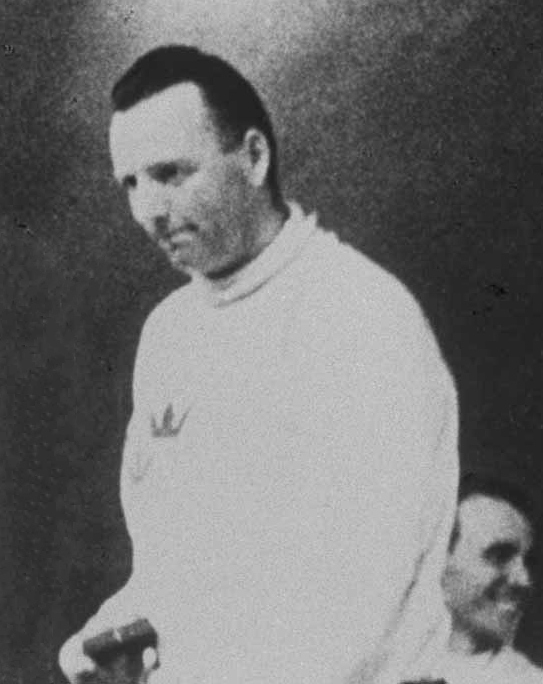
- Ljungquist at the 1952 Olympics

Personal information
- Full name: Bengt Helge Ljungquist
- Born: 20 September 1912 Umeå, Sweden
- Died: 15 July 1979 (aged 66) Förslöv, Sweden
- Height: 185 cm (6 ft 1 in)
- Weight: 90 kg (198 lb)

Sport
- Sport: Fencing
- Events: Épée, sabre, foil
- Club: Skövde FF; Stockholms AF; K3 IF, Skövde
Medal record
Representing Sweden
Olympic Games
Bronze medal – third place	1948 Helsinki	Épée, team
Silver medal – second place	1952 Melbourne	Épée, team
World Championships
Bronze medal – third place	1937 Paris	Épée, team
Silver medal – second place	1938 Piešťany	Épée, team
Silver medal – second place	1947 Lisbon	Épée, ind.
Silver medal – second place	1947 Lisbon	Épée, team
Bronze medal – third place	1951 Stockholm	Épée, team
Silver medal – second place	1954 Luxemburg	Épée, team

He competed in various fencing events at the 1936, 1948, 1952 and 1956 Olympics and won a silver and bronze in the team épée in 1948 and 1952. In 1964 he took part only in mixed dressage events and finished fifth with the Swedish team.

At the world fencing championships Ljungquist won four silver and two bronze medals in the épée in 1937–1954.

During a visit with his sister to the 1968 Summer Olympics in Mexico City, he made a trip to the United States that sparked his interest in furthering dressage. He later became a United States Equestrian Team coach. As a United States Equestrian Team coach, Ljungquist guided the US dressage team to a bronze medal at the 1976 Summer Olympics and a gold medal at the 1975 Pan American Games. He was inducted into the United States Dressage Federation Hall of Fame in 1998.

== Personal life ==
In 1942, Ljungquist married Märta Thorén (born 1915), the daughter of Captain Gösta Thorén and Märta Bernström. He was the dather of Ewa (born 1943), Sten (born 1944) and Ulf (born 1947).

== Death ==
He died on 15 July 1979 in Förslöv, Sweden during a visit from the United States where he was living.

== Dates of rank ==
- 193? – Second lieutenant
- 1936 – Lieutenant
- 1943 – Ryttmästare
- 1954 – Major
- 1959 – Lieutenant colonel
- 1967 – Colonel

== Awards and decorations ==
=== Swedish ===
- (Sweden) Knight of the Order of the Sword (1954)
- (Sweden) Skaraborg County Schooting Association's Gold Medal (Skaraborgs skytteförbunds guldmedalj)
- (Sweden) Swedish Equestrian Badge of Honor (Svensk ridsports hederstecken)
- (Sweden) Swedish Fencing Association's Gold Medal (Svenska fäktförbundet EtoGM)

=== Foreign ===
- Knight 1st Class of the Order of the White Rose of Finland
- (Norway) Knight 1st Class of the Order of St. Olav
- (Netherlands) Knight of the Order of Orange-Nassau
- (United Kingdom) Honorary Lieutenant of the Royal Victorian Order (June 1956)
- (Finland) 4th Class of the Order of the Cross of Liberty with Swords
- (France) Medal of Honour for Physical Education, silver (Médaille d'Honneur de l'Education Physique)
- (Finland) Finnish War Commemorative Medal
- (Finland) Finnish Commemorative Cross on the occasion of the Finnish War 1939-45

== Honours ==
- Member of the Samfundet SHT
- Member of the Rotary International
- Member of the United States Dressage Federation Hall of Fame (1998)

== See also ==
- Dual sport and multi-sport Olympians

Military offices
Preceded by Anders Grafström	Life Guards Squadron; 1955–1959	Succeeded by Nils-Fredrik Haegerström
Preceded by Fritz Magnus Sommar Bruzelius	Life Regiment Hussars; 1959–1967	Succeeded by Gustaf Malmström
