= Frank Cervell =

Swedish fencer (1907–1970)

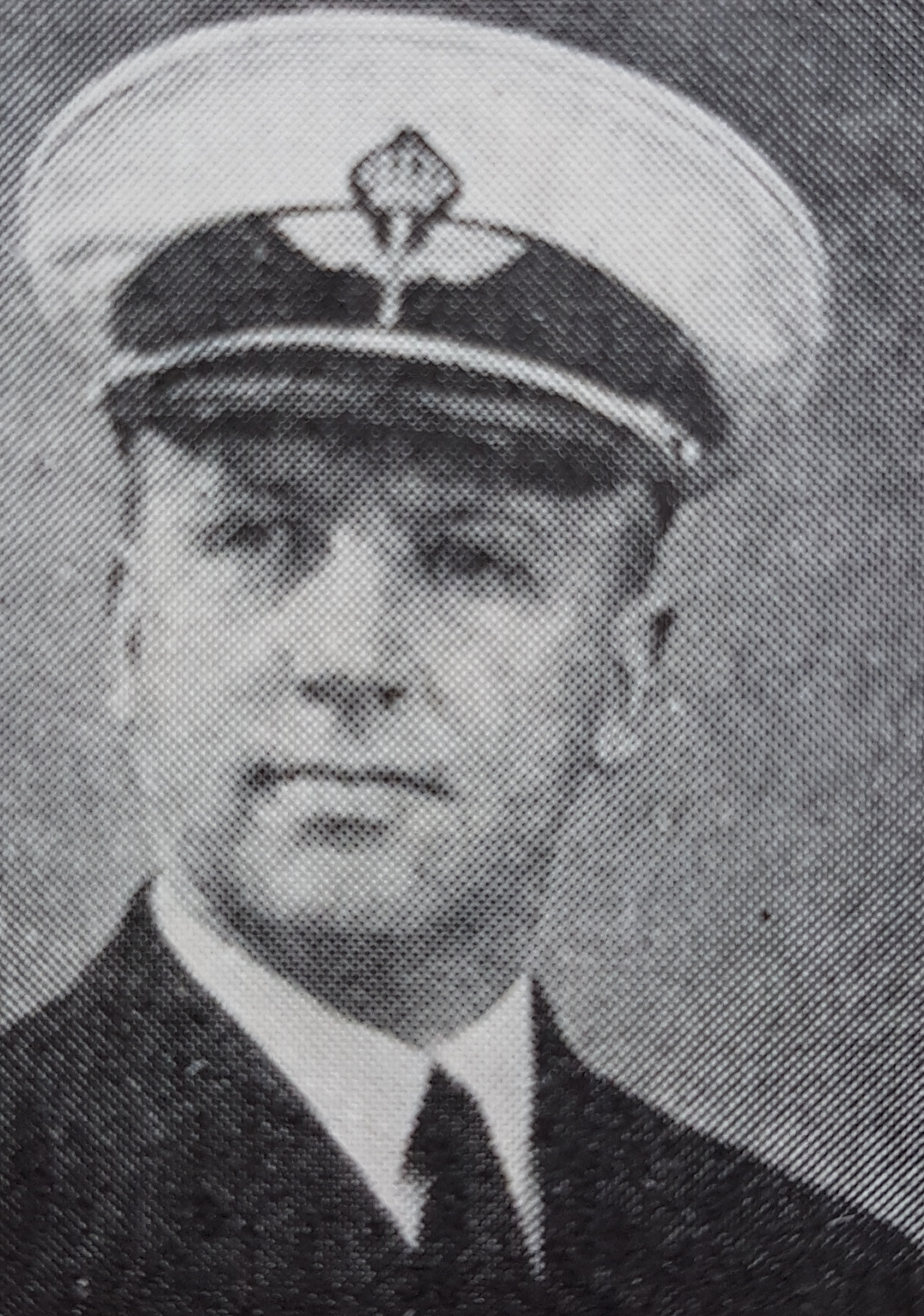
- Born: Frank Rutger Cervell; 22 February 1907; Norrköping, Sweden
- Died: 3 September 1970 (aged 63); Stockholm, Sweden
- Military career
- Allegiance: Sweden
- Branch: Swedish Air Force
- Service years: 1930–1963
- Rank: Colonel
- Commands: Bråvalla Wing

Frank Cervell
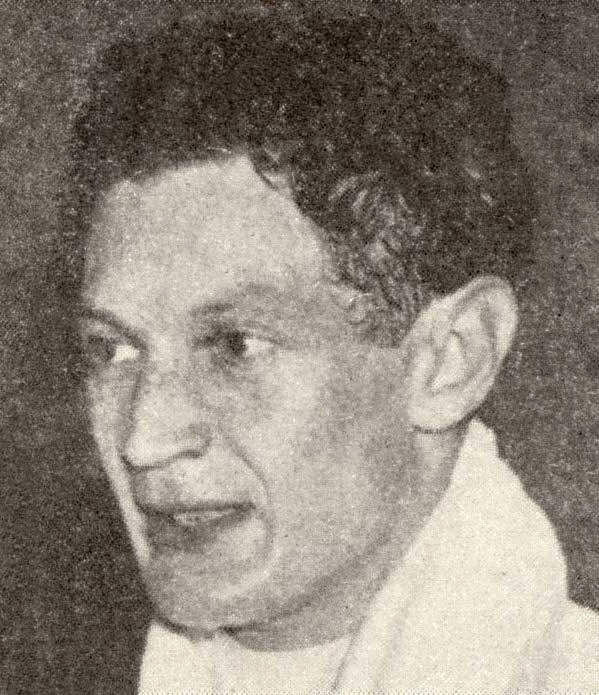

Personal information
- Born: Frank Rutger Cervell; 22 February 1907 Norrköping, Sweden
- Died: 3 September 1970 (aged 63) Stockholm, Sweden

Sport
- Sport: Fencing
- Event: Épée
- Club: FFF, Stockholm
Medal record
Representing Sweden
Olympic Games
Bronze medal – third place	1948 London	Épée, team
World Championships
Bronze medal – third place	1937 Paris	Épée, team
Silver medal – second place	1938 Piešťany	Épée, team

Colonel Frank Rutger Cervell (22 February 1907 – 3 September 1970) was an officer in the Swedish Air Force and a fencer. He won bronze medals in the team épée event at the 1948 Summer Olympics and 1937 World Championships, as well as a world championship silver in 1938.

== Early life ==
Cervell was born on 22 February 1907 in Norrköping, Sweden, the son of consul Gustaf Johansson and his wife Anna Valentin.

== Career ==
Cervell was commissioned as an officer in the Swedish Navy in 1930 with the rank of second lieutenant. He was promoted to lieutenant in 1934 and transferred to the Swedish Air Force in 1936 where he was promoted to captain in 1940 and major in 1944. Cervell served as air attaché in London and Oslo from 1943 to 1946 and as head of department in the Air Staff in 1946. He was then commanding officer of the Bråvalla Wing (F 13) from 1950 to 1959. Cervell was promoted to lieutenant Colonel in 1947 and to colonel in 1951. In 1959, he was appointed as air and naval attaché in Paris. Cervell served in this position until 1963.

He became Aide-de-camp to the Crown Prince in 1943 and chief Aide-de-camp to King Gustaf VI Adolf in 1951. Cervell was chairman of the board of the Gillette (Sweden) AB, Ludvig Wigart & C:os AB and H Unér AB. He was CEO of the Swedish Defence Material Export Promotion Group.

== Personal life ==
In 1931, he married Louise Wigart (born 1907).

== Dates of rank ==
- 1930 – Second lieutenant
- 1934 – Lieutenant
- 1940 – Captain
- 1944 – Major
- 1947 – Lieutenant colonel
- 1951 – Colonel

== Awards and decorations ==
=== Swedish ===
- (Sweden) King Gustaf V's Jubilee Commemorative Medal (1948)
- (Sweden) Commander 1st Class of the Order of the Sword (6 June 1959)
- (Sweden) Knight of the Order of Vasa
- (Sweden) Swedish Women's Voluntary Defence Organization Royal Medal of Merit in silver

=== Foreign ===
- Commander of the Order of the Crown of Italy
- (United Kingdom) Honorary Commander of the Royal Victorian Order (June 1956)
- (France) Knight of the Legion of Honour
- (France) French de l'éducation physique
- (France) French Air Force aviation badge
- (Italy) Italian Air Force aviation badge
