= Carlo Agostoni =

Italian fencer (1909–1972)

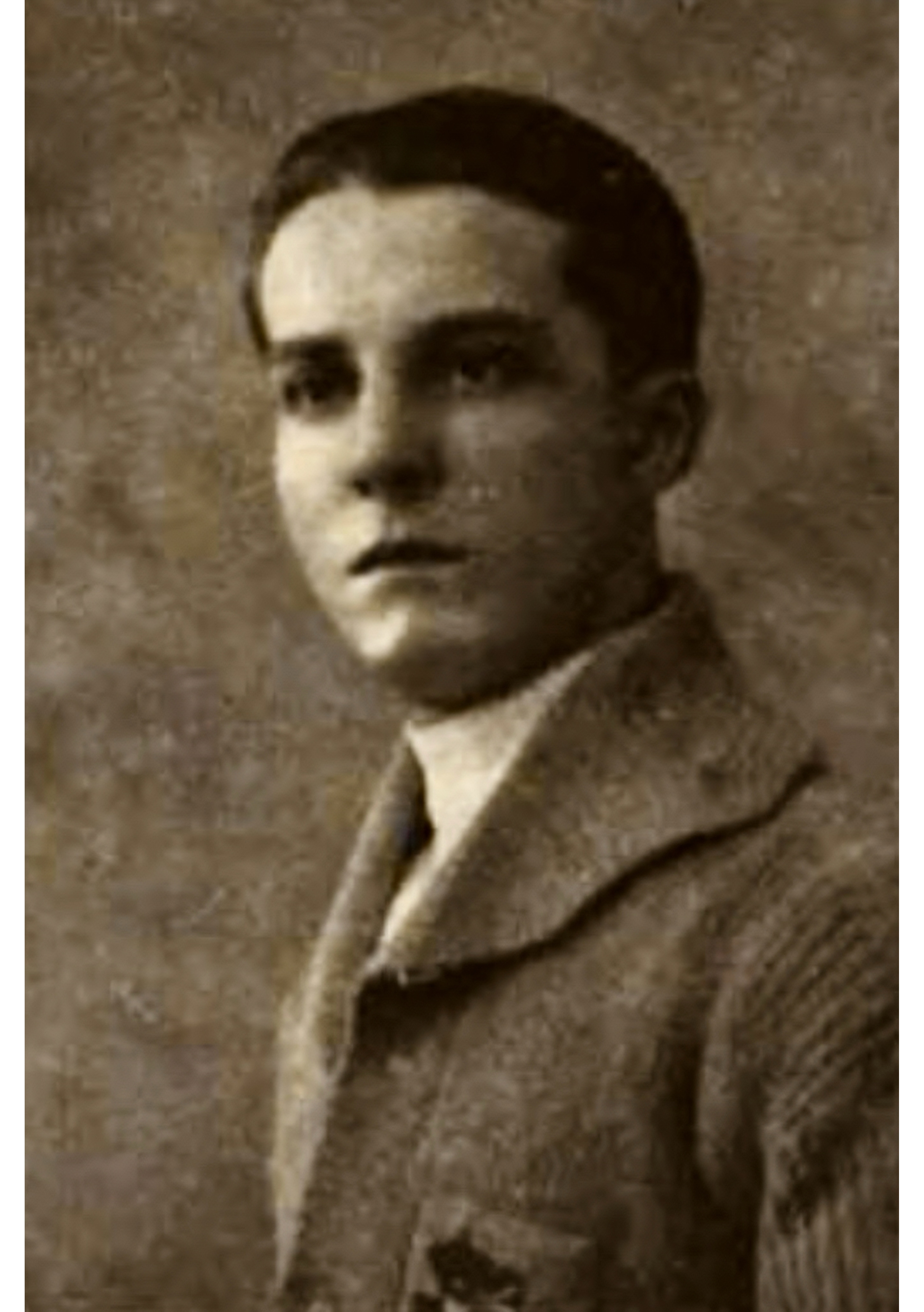
- Carlo Agostoni

Personal information
- Full name: Carlo Agostoni Faini
- Born: 23 March 1909 Milan, Kingdom of Italy
- Died: 25 June 1972 (aged 63) Mexico City, Mexico

Sport
- Sport: Fencing
Medal record
Men's fencing
Representing Italy
Olympic Games
| Gold medal – first place | 1928 Amsterdam | Épée, team |
| Silver medal – second place | 1932 Los Angeles | Épée, team |
| Bronze medal – third place | 1932 Los Angeles | Épée, individual |
| Silver medal – second place | 1948 London | Épée, team |

Carlo Agostoni (23 March 1909 – 25 June 1972) was an Italian fencer. He won a gold medal, two silvers, and a bronze at three Olympic Games.
