= Édouard Artigas =

French fencer (1906–2001)

Personal information
- Born: 26 February 1906 Paris, France
- Died: 25 February 2001 (aged 94)

Sport
- Sport: Fencing
Medal record
Men's fencing
Representing France
Olympic Games
Gold medal – first place	1948 London	Épée, team

Édouard Artigas (26 February 1906 – 25 February 2001) was a French fencer. He won a gold medal in the team épée event at the 1948 Summer Olympics.
