= Marcel Desprets =

French fencer (1906–1973)

Personal information
- Born: 19 August 1906
- Died: 12 March 1973 (aged 66)

Sport
- Sport: Fencing
Medal record
Men's fencing
Representing France
Olympic Games
Gold medal – first place	1948 London	Épée, team

Marcel Desprets (19 August 1906 – 12 March 1973) was a French fencer. He won a gold medal in the team épée event at the 1948 Summer Olympics.
