= Henri Lepage (fencer) =

French fencer (1908–1996)

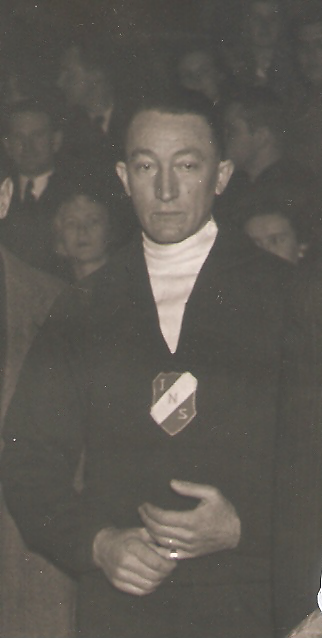

Personal information
- Born: 30 April 1908 Épinal, Vosges, France
- Died: 26 October 1996 (aged 88) Épinal, Vosges, France

Sport
- Sport: Fencing
Medal record
Men's fencing
Representing France
Olympic Games
Gold medal – first place	1948 London	Épée, team

Henri Lepage (30 April 1908 – 26 October 1996) was a French fencer. He won a gold medal in the team épée event at the 1948 Summer Olympics.
