= Henri Guérin (fencer) =

French fencer (1905–1967)

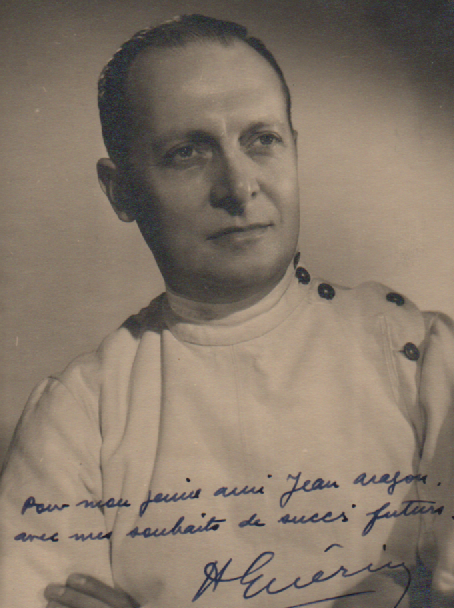

Personal information
- Born: 20 May 1905 Paris, France
- Died: 11 October 1967 (aged 62) Neuilly-sur-Seine, Hauts-de-Seine, France

Sport
- Sport: Fencing
Medal record
Men's fencing
Representing France
Olympic Games
Gold medal – first place	1948 London	Épée, team

Henri Guérin (French pronunciation: [ɑ̃ʁi ɡeʁɛ̃]; 20 May 1905 – 11 October 1967) was a French fencer. He won a gold medal in the team épée event at the 1948 Summer Olympics.
