= Fencing at the 1952 Summer Olympics – Men's foil =

Olympic fencing event

Men's foil at the Games of the XV Olympiad
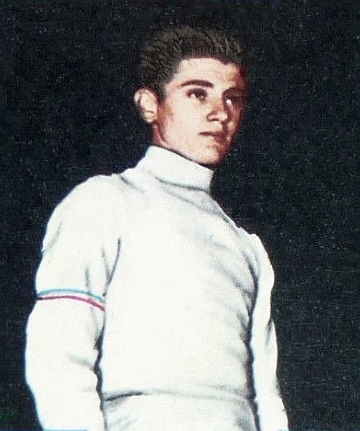
- Christian d'Oriola (1948)
- Venue: Westend Tennis Hall, Espoo
- Dates: 23–24 July 1952
- Competitors: 61 from 25 nations

Medalists
1st place, gold medalist(s)		Christian d'Oriola	France
2nd place, silver medalist(s)		Edoardo Mangiarotti	Italy
3rd place, bronze medalist(s)		Manlio Di Rosa	Italy

The men's foil was one of seven fencing events on the fencing at the 1952 Summer Olympics programme. It was the eleventh appearance of the event. The competition was held from 23 July 1952 to 24 July 1952. 61 fencers from 25 nations competed. All three medallists were left-handed. Nations were limited to three fencers each since 1928. The event was won by Christian d'Oriola of France, the nation's second consecutive victory in the men's foil and sixth overall. D'Oriola was the fifth man to win multiple medals in the event. The silver and bronze medals were won by Edoardo Mangiarotti and Manlio Di Rosa of Italy.

== Background ==
This was the 11th appearance of the event, which has been held at every Summer Olympics except 1908 (when there was a foil display only rather than a medal event). Six of the eight finalists from 1948 returned: gold medalist Jehan Buhan and silver medalist Christian d'Oriola of France, bronze medalist Lajos Maszlay of Hungary, fourth-place finisher John Emrys Lloyd of Great Britain (in his fourth Games), sixth-place finisher Manlio Di Rosa of Italy, and seventh-place finisher Paul Valcke of Belgium. The Italian and French teams, as usual, were strong. For the French, d'Oriola was the 1947 and 1949 world champion and Buhan had been on the podium in 1950 and 1951. For the Italians, Edoardo Mangiarotti had finished third in 1949 and second in 1951 and Manlio Di Rosa had won in 1951.

Colombia, Ireland, Luxembourg, and Turkey each made their debut in the men's foil. The United States made its 10th appearance, most of any nation, having missed only the inaugural 1896 competition.

== Competition format ==
The event used a four-round format. In each round, the fencers were divided into pools to play a round-robin within the pool. Bouts were to five touches. The 1952 tournament introduced byes for the fencers from the top 4 nations in the team foil event, who advanced directly to the quarterfinals. Ties were broken through fence-off bouts ("barrages") in early rounds if necessary for determining advancement. Ties not necessary for advancement were either not broken (if at least one fencer had not finished all bouts in the round-robin) or broken first by touches received and then by touches scored. In the final, ties were broken by barrage if necessary for medal placement but otherwise first by touches received and then by touches scored. Standard foil rules were used, including that touches had to be made with the tip of the foil, the target area was limited to the torso, and priority determined the winner of double touches.

- Round 1: There were 7 pools of 6–8 fencers each. The top 4 fencers in each pool advanced to the quarterfinals.
- Quarterfinals: There were 6 pools of 6–7 fencers each. The top 3 fencers in each quarterfinal advanced to the semifinals.
- Semifinals: There were 3 pools of 6 fencers each. The top 3 fencers in each semifinal advanced to the final.
- Final: The final pool had 9 fencers.

== Schedule ==
All times are Eastern European Summer Time (UTC+3)

Date	Time	Round
Wednesday, 23 July 1952	8:00; 15:00	Round 1 Quarterfinals
Thursday, 24 July 1952	8:00; 15:00	Semifinals; Final

== Results ==
=== Round 1 ===
The top 4 finishers in each pool advanced to the quarterfinals. Fencers from the four teams that advanced to the final of the men's team foil event received byes through round 1:

- Egypt: Salah Dessouki, Mohamed Ali Riad, and Mahmoud Younes
- France: Jéhan Buhan, Christian d'Oriola, and Jacques Lataste
- Italy: Giancarlo Bergamini, Manlio Di Rosa, and Edoardo Mangiarotti
- Hungary: Lajos Maszlay, Endre Palócz, and Endre Tilli

==== Pool 1 ====
Rank	Fencer	Nation	Wins	Losses	TS	TR	Notes
1	Vasile Chelaru	Romania	4	1		12	Q
1	Nate Lubell	United States	4	1		14	Q
1	Benito Ramos	Mexico	4	1		19	Q
4	Mark Midler	Soviet Union	3	1		11	Q
5	Karl Bach	Saar	2	4		28	
6	Ricardo Rimini	Uruguay	0	4		20	
6	Augusto Gutiérrez	Venezuela	0	5		25	

==== Pool 2 ====
Paul defeated Lund in a barrage for fourth place.

Rank	Fencer	Nation	Wins	Losses	TS	TR	Notes
1	Rolf Magnusson	Sweden	5	1		14	Q
2	German Bokun	Soviet Union	4	1		13	Q
2	Félix Galimi	Argentina	4	1		17	Q
4	Raymond Paul	Great Britain	3	3		23	Q
5	Ivan Lund	Australia	3	3		23	
6	Juan Kavanagh	Venezuela	1	5		28	
6	Roland Asselin	Canada	0	6		30	

==== Pool 3 ====
Iesi defeated Thuillier in a barrage for fourth place.

Rank	Fencer	Nation	Wins	Losses	TS	TR	Notes
1	Bo Eriksson	Sweden	4	1		16	Q
2	Nicolae Marinescu	Romania	3	2		17	Q
3	Norman Casmir	Germany	3	2		21	Q
4	Sergio Iesi	Uruguay	2	3		17	Q
5	Harry Thuillier	Ireland	2	3		18	
6	Jock Gibson	Australia	1	4		22	

==== Pool 4 ====
Rank	Fencer	Nation	Wins	Losses	TS	TR	Notes
1	André Verhalle	Belgium	5	1		16	Q
2	Jerzy Twardokens	Poland	4	1		16	Q
2	René Paul	Great Britain	4	2		17	Q
4	Fulvio Galimi	Argentina	3	2		17	Q
5	Kurt Wahl	Ireland	2	4		25	
6	Shinichi Maki	Japan	2	4		27	
7	Rubén Soberón	Guatemala	0	6		30	

==== Pool 5 ====
Rank	Fencer	Nation	Wins	Losses	TS	TR	Notes
1	Luke Wendon	Great Britain	5	1		16	Q
1	John Fethers	Australia	5	2		20	Q
1	Leif Klette	Norway	5	2		21	Q
1	Nils Rydström	Sweden	5	2		26	Q
5	Julius Eisenecker	Germany	2	4		20	
5	Patrick Duffy	Ireland	2	4		27	
5	Ernst Rau	Saar	2	5		28	
8	Giovanni Bertorelli	Venezuela	0	6		30	

==== Pool 6 ====
Lindeman and Vîlcea defeated Rodríguez in a three-way barrage for third and fourth places.

Rank	Fencer	Nation	Wins	Losses	TS	TR	Notes
1	Albie Axelrod	United States	5	0	25	10	Q
1	Gustave Ballister	Belgium	5	1		13	Q
3	Kurt Lindeman	Finland	3	3		21	Q
4	Andrei Vîlcea	Great Britain	3	3		22	Q
5	José Rodríguez	Argentina	3	3		23	
6	Edward Brooke	Canada	1	4		22	
7	Eduardo López	Guatemala	0	6		30	

==== Pool 7 ====
Rank	Fencer	Nation	Wins	Losses	TS	TR	Notes
1	Yulen Uralov	Soviet Union	4	1		12	Q
1	Daniel Bukantz	United States	4	1		16	Q
1	Paul Valcke	Belgium	4	2		18	Q
4	Jerzy Pawłowski	Poland	3	2		18	Q
5	Heikki Raitio	Finland	1	4		21	
5	Günther Knödler	Saar	1	4		22	
5	Abelardo Menéndez	Cuba	1	4		24	

=== Quarterfinals ===
The top 3 finishers in each pool advanced to the semifinals.

==== Quarterfinal 1 ====
Rank	Fencer	Nation	Wins	Losses	TS	TR	Notes
1	Manlio Di Rosa	Italy	4	0	20	10	Q
2	Bo Eriksson	Sweden	3	1		12	Q
2	Salah Dessouki	Egypt	3	2		22	Q
4	Jerzy Twardokens	Poland	2	3		20	
5	Raymond Paul	Great Britain	1	3		18	
6	Mark Midler	Soviet Union	0	4		20	

==== Quarterfinal 2 ====
Rank	Fencer	Nation	Wins	Losses	TS	TR	Notes
1	Giancarlo Bergamini	Italy	4	2		15	Q
2	Mahmoud Younes	Egypt	4	2		20	Q
3	Albie Axelrod	United States	4	2		21	Q
4	Jerzy Pawłowski	Poland	3	3	22	26	
5	Kurt Lindeman	Finland	3	3	21	26	
6	Félix Galimi	Argentina	2	4		28	
7	Sergio Iesi	Uruguay	1	5		25	

==== Quarterfinal 3 ====
Rank	Fencer	Nation	Wins	Losses	TS	TR	Notes
1	Edoardo Mangiarotti	Italy	6	0	30	7	Q
2	Mohamed Ali Riad	Egypt	4	2		21	Q
3	Nils Rydström	Sweden	4	2		25	Q
4	Luke Wendon	Great Britain	2	3		18	
4	Fulvio Galimi	Argentina	2	3		21	
4	Paul Valcke	Belgium	2	4		24	
7	Nicolae Marinescu	Romania	0	6		30	

==== Quarterfinal 4 ====
d'Oriola and Tilli defeated Uralov in a three-way barrage for second and third place.

Rank	Fencer	Nation	Wins	Losses	TS	TR	Notes
1	René Paul	Great Britain	5	1		17	Q
2	Christian d'Oriola	France	4	2		16	Q
3	Endre Tilli	Hungary	4	2		23	Q
4	Yulen Uralov	Soviet Union	4	2		19	
5	Gustave Ballister	Belgium	2	4		26	
6	Norman Casmir	Germany	1	5		28	
7	Benito Ramos	Mexico	1	5		29	

==== Quarterfinal 5 ====
Rank	Fencer	Nation	Wins	Losses	TS	TR	Notes
1	Jacques Lataste	France	6	0	30	10	Q
2	Endre Palócz	Hungary	4	2		14	Q
3	André Verhalle	Belgium	4	2		23	Q
4	Daniel Bukantz	United States	3	3		23	
5	German Bokun	Soviet Union	2	4		25	
6	Leif Klette	Norway	1	5		29	
7	Andrei Vîlcea	Great Britain	1	5		29	

==== Quarterfinal 6 ====
Lubell prevailed over Magnusson, Chelaru, and Fethers in a four-way barrage for third place.

Rank	Fencer	Nation	Wins	Losses	TS	TR	Notes
1	Jéhan Buhan	France	4	1		12	Q
2	Lajos Maszlay	Hungary	3	2		17	Q
3	Nate Lubell	United States	2	3		20	Q
4	Rolf Magnusson	Sweden	2	3		23	
5	Vasile Chelaru	Romania	2	3		23	
6	John Fethers	Australia	2	3		21	

=== Semifinals ===
The top 3 finishers in each pool advanced to the final.

==== Semifinal 1 ====
Tilli defeated Verhalle in a barrage for third place.

Rank	Fencer	Nation	Wins	Losses	TS	TR	Notes
1	Giancarlo Bergamini	Italy	4	1		14	Q
1	Jéhan Buhan	France	4	1		14	Q
3	Endre Tilli	Hungary	3	2		19	Q
4	André Verhalle	Belgium	3	2		18	
5	Nate Lubell	United States	1	4		24	
6	Mohamed Ali Riad	Egypt	0	5		25	

==== Semifinal 2 ====
Dessouki defeated Maszlay in a barrage for third place.

Rank	Fencer	Nation	Wins	Losses	TS	TR	Notes
1	Edoardo Mangiarotti	Italy	5	0	25	11	Q
2	Jacques Lataste	France	4	1		13	Q
3	Salah Dessouki	Egypt	2	3		17	Q
4	Lajos Maszlay	Hungary	2	3		19	
5	Albie Axelrod	United States	1	4		22	
6	Nils Rydström	Sweden	1	4		23	

==== Semifinal 3 ====
Rank	Fencer	Nation	Wins	Losses	TS	TR	Notes
1	Christian d'Oriola	France	4	1		13	Q
2	Manlio Di Rosa	Italy	4	1		16	Q
3	Mahmoud Younes	Egypt	3	2		18	Q
4	Endre Palócz	Hungary	2	3		20	
5	Bo Eriksson	Sweden	1	4		22	
6	René Paul	Great Britain	1	4		23	

=== Final ===
Rank	Fencer	Nation	Wins	Losses	TS	TR
1st place, gold medalist(s)	Christian d'Oriola	France	8	0	40	12
2nd place, silver medalist(s)	Edoardo Mangiarotti	Italy	6	2		21
3rd place, bronze medalist(s)	Manlio Di Rosa	Italy	5	3		22
4	Jacques Lataste	France	4	4		31
5	Jéhan Buhan	France	4	4	29	33
6	Mahmoud Younes	Egypt	4	4	27	33
7	Salah Dessouki	Egypt	2	6		35
8	Giancarlo Bergamini	Italy	2	6		36
9	Endre Tilli	Hungary	1	7		39
