= Fencing at the 1952 Summer Olympics – Men's team foil =

Men's team foil at the Games of the XV Olympiad
- Venue: Westend Tennis Hall, Espoo
- Dates: 21–22 July 1952
- Competitors: 77 from 15 nations

Medalists
1st place, gold medalist(s)		Claude Netter; Jéhan Buhan; Jacques Lataste; Jacques Noël; Christian d'Oriola; Adrien Rommel	France
2nd place, silver medalist(s)		Edoardo Mangiarotti; Manlio Di Rosa; Giancarlo Bergamini; Antonio Spallino; Giorgio Pellini; Renzo Nostini	Italy
3rd place, bronze medalist(s)		Endre Tilli; Aladár Gerevich; Endre Palócz; Lajos Maszlay; Tibor Berczelly; József Sákovics	Hungary

The men's team foil was one of seven fencing events on the fencing at the 1952 Summer Olympics programme. It was the eighth appearance of the event. The competition was held from 21 to 22 July 1952. 77 fencers from 15 nations competed.

== Results ==
Source: Official results; and Sports Reference

=== Round 1 ===
The top two nations in each pool advanced to the quarter-finals.

Pool 1
Rank	Nation	Wins	Losses	Bouts Won	Bouts Lost
1	Hungary	1	0	15	1
2	Belgium	1	0	9	3
3	Saar	0	2	4	24

Pool 2
Rank	Nation	Wins	Losses	Bouts Won	Bouts Lost
1	Egypt	1	0	9	4
2	Argentina	1	0	8	8
3	Soviet Union	0	2	12	17

Pool 3
Rank	Nation	Wins	Losses	Bouts Won	Bouts Lost
1	Great Britain	1	0	14	2
2	Italy	1	0	9	0
3	Venezuela	0	2	2	23

Pool 4
Rank	Nation	Wins	Losses	Bouts Won	Bouts Lost
1	Sweden	1	0	13	3
2	France	1	0	9	0
3	Australia	0	2	3	22

Pool 5
Rank	Nation	Wins	Losses	Bouts Won	Bouts Lost
1	Germany	1	0	10	6
2	United States	1	0	9	7
3	Romania	0	2	13	19

=== Round 2 ===
The top two nations in each pool advanced to the semi-finals.

Pool 1
Rank	Nation	Wins	Losses	Bouts Won	Bouts Lost
1	Egypt	1	0	10	6
2	Italy	1	0	9	1
3	Sweden	0	2	7	19

Pool 2
Rank	Nation	Wins	Losses	Bouts Won	Bouts Lost
1	France	1	0	9	2
2	Belgium	1	0	9	7
3	Great Britain	0	2	9	18

Pool 3
Rank	Nation	Wins	Losses	Bouts Won	Bouts Lost
1	Hungary	2	1	31	17
2	Argentina	2	1	27	21
3	United States	2	1	25	23
4	Germany	0	3	13	35

=== Semifinals ===
The top two nations in each pool advanced to the final.

Pool 1
Rank	Nation	Wins	Losses	Bouts Won	Bouts Lost
1	Hungary	1	0	11	5
2	Italy	1	0	9	1
3	Belgium	0	2	6	20

Pool B
Rank	Nation	Wins	Losses	Bouts Won	Bouts Lost
1	France	1	0	9	2
2	Egypt	1	0	9	7
3	Argentina	0	2	9	18

=== Final ===
The final was a round-robin.

Rank	Nation	Wins	Losses	Bouts Won	Bouts Lost
1st place, gold medalist(s)	France	3	0	35	11
2nd place, silver medalist(s)	Italy	2	1	34	12
3rd place, bronze medalist(s)	Hungary	1	2	16	31
4	Egypt	0	3	8	39

Results

- France 8-6 Italy
- France 12-4 Hungary
- France 15-1 Egypt
- Italy 13-3 Hungary
- Italy 15-1 Egypt
- Hungary 9-6 Egypt

== Rosters ==
Argentina

- Fulvio Galimi
- José Rodríguez
- Eduardo Sastre
- Félix Galimi
- Santiago Massini

Australia

- Charles Stanmore
- John Fethers
- Jock Gibson
- Ivan Lund

Belgium

- Pierre Van Houdt
- André Verhalle
- Alex Bourgeois
- Paul Valcke
- Édouard Yves
- Gustave Ballister

Egypt

- Salah Dessouki
- Mohamed Ali Riad
- Osman Abdel Hafeez
- Mahmoud Younes
- Mohamed Zulficar
- Hassan Hosni Tawfik

France

- Claude Netter
- Jéhan Buhan
- Jacques Lataste
- Jacques Noël
- Christian d'Oriola
- Adrien Rommel

Germany

- Willy Fascher
- Kurt Wahl
- Norman Casmir
- Julius Eisenecker
- Siegfried Rossner

Great Britain

- René Paul
- Luke Wendon
- Emrys Lloyd
- Raymond Paul
- Harry Cooke
- Allan Jay

Hungary

- Endre Tilli
- Aladár Gerevich
- Endre Palócz
- Lajos Maszlay
- Tibor Berczelly
- József Sákovics

Italy

- Edoardo Mangiarotti
- Manlio Di Rosa
- Giancarlo Bergamini
- Antonio Spallino
- Giorgio Pellini
- Renzo Nostini

Romania

- Andrei Vîlcea
- Ilie Tudor
- Nicolae Marinescu
- Vasile Chelaru

Saar

- Ernst Rau
- Walter Brödel
- Karl Bach
- Günther Knödler

Soviet Union

- Ivan Komarov
- German Bokun
- Yulen Uralov
- Mark Midler

Sweden

- Rolf Magnusson
- Sven Fahlman
- Nils Rydström
- Bo Eriksson

United States

- Silvio Giolito
- Albie Axelrod
- Nate Lubell
- Byron Krieger
- Daniel Bukantz
- Hal Goldsmith

Venezuela

- Giovanni Bertorelli
- Nelson Nieves
- Juan Kavanagh
- Gustavo Gutiérrez
- Augusto Gutiérrez
