= Italy at the 1952 Summer Olympics =

- IOC code: ITA
- NOC: Italian National Olympic Committee

in Helsinki, Finland July 19–August 3, 1952
- Competitors: 231 (208 men, 23 women) in 19 sports
- Flag bearer: Miranda Cicognani
- Medals Ranked 5th: Gold 8 Silver 9 Bronze 4 Total 21

Summer Olympics appearances (overview)
- 1896; 1900; 1904; 1908; 1912; 1920; 1924; 1928; 1932; 1936; 1948; 1952; 1956; 1960; 1964; 1968; 1972; 1976; 1980; 1984; 1988; 1992; 1996; 2000; 2004; 2008; 2012; 2016; 2020; 2024

Other related appearances
- 1906 Intercalated Games

Italy competed at the 1952 Summer Olympics in Helsinki, Finland. 231 competitors, 208 men and 23 women, took part in 114 events in 19 sports.

== Medalists ==
=== Gold ===
- Pino Dordoni — Athletics, Men's 50 km Walk
- Aureliano Bolognesi — Boxing, Men's Lightweight
- Enzo Sacchi — Cycling, Men's 1.000m Sprint (Scratch)
- Loris Campana, Mino de Rossi, Guido Messina, and Marino Morettini — Cycling, Men's 4.000m Team Pursuit
- Edoardo Mangiarotti — Fencing, Men's Épée Individual
- Roberto Battaglia, Franco Bertinetti, Giuseppe Delfino, Dario Mangiarotti, Edoardo Mangiarotti, and Carlo Pavesi — Fencing, Men's Épée Team
- Irene Camber — Fencing, Women's Foil Individual
- Nicolò Rode and Agostino Straulino — Sailing, Men's Star

=== Silver ===
- Adolfo Consolini — Athletics, Men's Discus Throw
- Sergio Caprari — Boxing, Men's Featherweight
- Marino Morettini — Cycling, Men's 1.000m Time Trial
- Dino Bruni, Gianni Ghidini, and Vincenzo Zucconelli — Cycling, Men's Team Road Race
- Edoardo Mangiarotti — Fencing, Men's Foil Individual
- Giancarlo Bergamini, Manlio di Rosa, Edoardo Mangiarotti, Renzo Nostini, Giorgio Pellini, and Antonio Spallino — Fencing, Men's Foil Team
- Dario Mangiarotti — Fencing, Men's Épée Individual
- Gastone Darè, Roberto Ferrari, Renzo Nostini, Giorgio Pellini, Vincenzo Pinton, and Mauro Racca — Fencing, Men's Sabre Team
- Ignazio Fabra — Wrestling, Men's Greco-Roman Flyweight

=== Bronze ===
- Bruno Visintin — Boxing, Men's Light Welterweight
- Raffaello Gambino, Cesare Rubini, Maurizio Mannelli, Geminio Ognio, Ermenegildo Arena, Renato De Sanzuane, Carlo Peretti, Renato Traiola, Vincenzo Polito, Salvatore Gionta and Lucio Ceccarini — Water Polo, Men's Team Competition
- Antonio Maspes and Cesare Pinarello — Cycling, Men's 2.000m Tandem
- Manlio di Rosa — Fencing, Men's Foil Individual

== Athletics ==
=== Results ===
Men (25)
Athlete	Age	Event	Rank	Medal
Carlo Vittori	21	Men's 100 metres	6 h4 r2/4	
Franco Leccese	27	Men's 100 metres	3 h8 r1/4	
Wolfgango Montanari	21	Men's 100 metres	7 h7 r1/4	
Giorgio Sobrero	22	Men's 200 metres	3 h13r1/4	
Luigi Grossi	27	Men's 200 metres	4 h12r1/4	
Lucio Sangermano	19	Men's 200 metres	4 h18r1/4	
Gianni Rocca	23	Men's 400 metres	3 h6 r1/4	
Vincenzo Lombardo	20	Men's 400 metres	3 h7 r1/4	
Antonio Siddi	29	Men's 400 metres	4 h11r1/4	
Armando Filiput	28	Men's 400 metres Hurdles	6	
Franco Leccese	27	Men's 4 × 100 metres Relay	2 h1 r1/3	
Antonio Siddi	29	Men's 4 × 100 metres Relay	2 h1 r1/3	
Giorgio Sobrero	22	Men's 4 × 100 metres Relay	2 h1 r1/3	
Carlo Vittori	21	Men's 4 × 100 metres Relay	2 h1 r1/3	
Baldassare Porto	29	Men's 4 × 400 metres Relay	4 h2 r1/2	
Gianni Rocca	23	Men's 4 × 400 metres Relay	4 h2 r1/2	
Luigi Grossi	27	Men's 4 × 400 metres Relay	4 h2 r1/2	
Armando Filiput	28	Men's 4 × 400 metres Relay	4 h2 r1/2	
Asfò Bussotti	26	Men's Marathon	46	
Artidoro Berti	31	Men's Marathon	53	
Egilberto Martufi	26	Men's Marathon	AC	
Bruno Fait	28	Men's 10 kilometres Walk	8	
Telemaco Arcangeli	29	Men's 10 kilometres Walk	7 h2 r1/2	
Pino Dordoni	26	Men's 50 kilometres Walk	1	Gold
Giuseppe Kressevich	36	Men's 50 kilometres Walk	10	
Salvatore Cascino	34	Men's 50 kilometres Walk1	9	
Adolfo Consolini	35	Men's Discus Throw	2	Silver
Giuseppe Tosi	36	Men's Discus Throw	8	
Teseo Taddia	32	Men's Hammer Throw	10	
Aivo Lucioli	23	Men's Hammer Throw	26 QR	
Amos Matteucci	37	Men's Javelin Throw	17	
Angiolo Profeti	34	Men's Shot Put	12	
Women (8)
Athlete	Age	Event	Rank	Medal
Giuseppina Leone	17	Women's 100 metres	4 h1 r2/4	
Liliana Tagliaferri	23	Women's 100 metres	6 h4 r2/4	
Vittoria Cesarini	19	Women's 100 metres	3 h3 r1/4	
Vera Martelli	21	Women's 200 metres	6 h3 r1/3	
Vittoria Cesarini	19	Women's 4 × 100 metres Relay	3 h2 r1/2	
Milena Greppi	23	Women's 4 × 100 metres Relay	3 h2 r1/2	
Giuseppina Leone	17	Women's 4 × 100 metres Relay	3 h2 r1/2	
Liliana Tagliaferri	23	Women's 4 × 100 metres Relay	3 h2 r1/2	
Milena Greppi	23	Women's 80 metres Hurdles	6 h1 r2/3	
Maria Musso	21	Women's 80 metres Hurdle	s4 h5 r1/3	
Edera Cordiale	32	Women's Discus Throw	14	
Ada Turci	28	Women's Javelin Throw	11	

== Basketball ==
Men's Team Competition

- Qualification Round (Group C)

- Lost to Canada (57-68)
- Defeated Turkey (49-37)
- Defeated Romania (53-39)
- Lost to Egypt (62-66) → did not advance, 17th place

== Cycling ==
Road Competition

Men's Individual Road Race (190.4 km)

- Dino Bruni — 5:10:54.0 (→ 5th place)
- Vincenzo Zucconelli — 5:11:16.5 (→ 6th place)
- Gianni Ghidini — 5:11:16.8 (→ 7th place)
- Bruno Monti — 5:11:35.0 (→ 15th place)

Track Competition

Men's 1.000m Time Trial

- Marino Morettini

- Final — 1:12.7 (→ Silver Medal)

Men's 1.000m Sprint Scratch Race

- Enzo Sacchi — Gold Medal

Men's 4.000m Team Pursuit

- Guido Messina, Loris Campana, Marino Morettini, and Mino de Rossi

- Final — defeated South Africa (→ Gold Medal)

== Diving ==
Men

Athlete	Event	Preliminary		Final	
Athlete	Event	Points	Rank	Points	Rank
Lamberto Mari	3 m springboard	54.42	32	Did not advance	
Lamberto Mari	10 m platform	60.44	26	Did not advance	

== Fencing ==
18 fencers, 15 men and 3 women, represented Italy in 1952.

Men's foil

- Edoardo Mangiarotti
- Manlio Di Rosa
- Giancarlo Bergamini

Men's team foil

- Edoardo Mangiarotti, Manlio Di Rosa, Giancarlo Bergamini, Antonio Spallino, Giorgio Pellini, Renzo Nostini

Men's épée

- Edoardo Mangiarotti
- Dario Mangiarotti
- Carlo Pavesi

Men's team épée

- Edoardo Mangiarotti, Dario Mangiarotti, Giuseppe Delfino, Carlo Pavesi, Franco Bertinetti, Roberto Battaglia

Men's sabre

- Gastone Darè
- Vincenzo Pinton
- Renzo Nostini

Men's team sabre

- Vincenzo Pinton, Renzo Nostini, Gastone Darè, Mauro Racca, Roberto Ferrari, Giorgio Pellini

Women's foil

- Irene Camber-Corno
- Silvia Strukel
- Velleda Cesari

== Football ==
Men's Team Competition

- Team Roster

- (1.) Ottavio Bugatti
- (2.) Giuseppe Corradi
- (3.) Amos Cardarelli
- (4.) Maino Neri
- (5.) Giovanni Azzini
- (6.) Arcadio Venturi
- (7.) Giampiero Boniperti
- (8.) Egisto Pandolfini
- (9.) Pasquale Vivolo
- (10.) Aredio Gimona
- (11.) Francesco La Rosa
- (12.) Anselmo Giorcelli
- (13.) Amos Mariani
- (14.) Giancarlo Cadé
- (15.) Battista Rota
- (16.) Giovani Capurro
- (17.) Alberto Fontanesi
- (18.) Corrado Viciani
- (19.) Rino Ferrario
- (20.) Roberto Lovati

== Gymnastics ==
=== Men's team competition ===
- Team Roster
- Fabio Bonacina
- Silvio Brivio
- Arrigo Carnoli
- Guido Figone
- Orlando Polmonari
- Littorio Sampieri
- Quinto Vadi
- Luigi Zanetti

=== Women's team competition ===
- Team Roster
- Renata Bianchi
- Grazia Bozzo
- Miranda Cicognani
- Elisabetta Durelli
- Licia Macchini
- Lidia Pitteri
- Luciana Reali
- Liliana Scaricabarozzi

== Modern pentathlon ==
Three male pentathletes represented Italy in 1952.

Individual

- Alfonso Marotta
- Duilio Brignetti
- Giulio Palmonella

Team

- Alfonso Marotta
- Duilio Brignetti
- Giulio Palmonella

== Rowing ==
Italy had 26 male rowers participate in all seven rowing events in 1952.

Men's single sculls

- Ugo Pifferi

Men's double sculls

- Silvio Bergamini
- Lodovico Sommaruga

Men's coxless pair

- Bruno Gamba
- Antonio Saverio

Men's coxed pair

- Giuseppe Ramani
- Aldo Tarlao
- Luciano Marion (cox)

Men's coxless four

- Giuseppe Moioli
- Elio Morille
- Giovanni Invernizzi
- Franco Faggi

Men's coxed four

- Albino Trevisan
- Amadeo Scarpi
- Abbondio Smerghetto
- Tarquinio Angiolin
- Domenico Cambieri (cox)

Men's eight

- Albino Baldan
- Savino Dalla Puppa
- Alberto Bozzato
- Ferdinando Smerghetto
- Montanino Nuvoli
- Dino Nardin
- Ottorino Enzo
- Pier Nicola Attorese
- Sergio Ghiatto (cox)

== Shooting ==
Eight shooters represented Italy in 1952.

25 m pistol

- Giorgio Pennacchietti
- Michelangelo Borriello

50 m pistol

- Luciano Galesi
- Renato Sacchi

100m running deer

- Luigi Ruspoli
- Ladislao Odescalchi

Trap

- Galliano Rossini
- Italo Bellini

== Swimming ==
Men

Ranks given are within the heat.

Athlete	Event	Heat		Semifinal		Final	
Athlete	Event	Time	Rank	Time	Rank	Time	Rank
Alfonso Buonocore	100 m freestyle	1:02.3	6	Did not advance			
Carlo Pedersoli	100 m freestyle	58.8	3	58.9	5	Did not advance	
Angelo Romani	400 m freestyle	5:05.1	4	Did not advance			
Egidio Massaria	100 m backstroke	1:08.8	1 Q	1:09.7	7	Did not advance	
Giorgio Grilz	200 m breaststroke	DSQ		Did not advance			
Carlo Pedersoli; Egidio Massaria; Angelo Romani; Giovanni Paliaga	4 × 200 m freestyle relay	9:17.9	5	—N/a		Did not advance	

Women

Ranks given are within the heat.

Athlete	Event	Heat		Semifinal		Final	
Athlete	Event	Time	Rank	Time	Rank	Time	Rank
Romana Calligaris	100 m freestyle	1:11.0	6	Did not advance			
Maria Nardi	100 m freestyle	1:13.2	5	Did not advance			
Maria Nardi; Fides Benini; Eva Belaise; Romana Calligaris	4 × 100 m freestyle relay	4:52.6	5	—N/a		Did not advance	

== Water polo ==
Men's Team Competition

- Team Roster

- Ermenegildo Arena
- Lucio Ceccarini
- Renato De Sanzuane
- Raffaello Gambino
- Salvatore Gionta
- Maurizio Mannelli
- Germinio Ognio
- Carlo Peretti
- Vincenzo Polito
- Cesare Rubini
- Renato Traiolo
