= Sweden at the 1952 Summer Olympics =

- IOC code: SWE
- NOC: Swedish Olympic Committee

in Helsinki
- Competitors: 206 (183 men and 23 women) in 17 sports
- Flag bearer: Bo Eriksson
- Medals Ranked 4th: Gold 12 Silver 13 Bronze 10 Total 35

Summer Olympics appearances (overview)
- 1896; 1900; 1904; 1908; 1912; 1920; 1924; 1928; 1932; 1936; 1948; 1952; 1956; 1960; 1964; 1968; 1972; 1976; 1980; 1984; 1988; 1992; 1996; 2000; 2004; 2008; 2012; 2016; 2020; 2024; 2028

Other related appearances
- 1906 Intercalated Games

Sweden competed at the 1952 Summer Olympics in Helsinki, Finland. 206 competitors, 183 men and 23 women, took part in 124 events in 17 sports.

== Medalists ==
Medal	Name	Sport	Event
Gold	John Mikaelsson	Athletics	Men's 10 km Walk
Gold	Gert Fredriksson	Canoeing	Men's K1 1000 m
Gold	Hans von Blixen-Finecke Jr	Equestrian	Three-Day Event
Gold	Folke Frölén; Olof Stahre; Hans von Blixen-Finecke Jr	Equestrian	Three-Day Team Event
Gold	Henri Saint Cyr	Equestrian	Dressage Individual
Gold	Gustaf Adolf Boltenstern; Gehnäll Persson; Henri Saint Cyr	Equestrian	Dressage Team
Gold	William Thoresson	Gymnastics	Men's Floor
Gold	Gun Röring; Ingrid Sandahl; Hjördis Nordin; Ann-Sofi Pettersson; Göta Pettersson; Evy Berggren; Vanja Blomberg; Karin Lindberg	Gymnastics	Women's Team Portable Apparatus
Gold	Lars Hall	Modern pentathlon	Men's Individual
Gold	Axel Grönberg	Wrestling (Greco-Roman)	Men's Middleweight
Gold	Olle Anderberg	Wrestling	Men's Freestyle Lightweight
Gold	Viking Palm	Wrestling	Men's Freestyle Light Heavyweight
Silver	Ingemar Johansson	Boxing	Men's Heavyweight
Silver	Lars Glassér; Ingemar Hedberg	Canoeing	Men's K2 1000 m
Silver	Gert Fredriksson	Canoeing	Men's K1 10000 m
Silver	Gunnar Åkerlund; Hans Wetterström	Canoeing	Men's K2 10000 m
Silver	Bengt Ljungquist; Lennart Magnusson; Berndt-Otto Rehbinder; Per Hjalmar Carleson; Sven Fahlman; Carl Forssell	Fencing	Men's Épée Team
Silver	Claes Egnell; Lars Hall; Thorsten Lindqvist	Modern pentathlon	Men's Team
Silver	Knut Holmqvist	Shooting	Men's Trap
Silver	Olof Sköldberg	Shooting	Men's Running Deer, Single & Double Shot
Silver	Gustav Freij	Wrestling (Greco-Roman)	Men's Lightweight
Silver	Gösta Andersson	Wrestling (Greco-Roman)	Men's Welterweight
Silver	Per Gunnar Berlin	Wrestling	Men's Freestyle Welterweight
Silver	Bertil Antonsson	Wrestling	Men's Freestyle Heavyweight
Silver	Erland Almqvist; Sidney Boldt-Christmas; Per Gedda	Sailing	Men's Dragon
Bronze	Gustaf Jansson	Athletics	Men's Marathon
Bronze	Ragnar Lundberg	Athletics	Men's Pole Vault
Bronze	Stig Sjölin	Boxing	Men's Middleweight
Bronze	National football team	Football	Men's Team Competition
Bronze	Hans Liljedahl	Shooting	Men's Trap
Bronze	Göran Larsson	Swimming	Men's 100m Freestyle
Bronze	Per Olof Östrand	Swimming	Men's 400m Freestyle
Bronze	Karl-Erik Nilsson	Wrestling (Greco-Roman)	Men's Light Heavyweight
Bronze	Rickard Sarby	Sailing	Men's Finn
Bronze	Magnus Wassén; Carl-Erik Ohlson; Folke Wassén	Sailing	Men's 5½ m Class

== Cycling ==
Road Competition

Men's Individual Road Race (190.4 km)

- Yngve Lundh — 5:12:15.2 (→ 16th place)
- Stig Mårtensson — 5:13:00.0 (→ 18th place)
- Allan Carlsson — 5:16:19.1 (→ 21st place)
- Lars Nordwall — did not finish (→ no ranking)

== Diving ==
Men

Athlete	Event	Preliminary		Final	
Athlete	Event	Points	Rank	Points	Rank
Gunnar Johansson	3 m springboard	59.11	27	Did not advance	
Frank Landqvist	3 m springboard	60.11	23	Did not advance	
Toivo Öhman	10 m platform	65.37	16	Did not advance	

Women

Athlete	Event	Preliminary		Final	
Athlete	Event	Points	Rank	Points	Rank
Anna-Stina Wahlberg	3 m springboard	48.47	13	Did not advance	

== Fencing ==
Ten fencers, all men, represented Sweden in 1952.

Men's foil

- Bo Eriksson
- Nils Rydström
- Rolf Magnusson

Men's team foil

- Rolf Magnusson, Sven Fahlman, Nils Rydström, Bo Eriksson

Men's épée

- Per Carleson
- Carl Forssell
- Sven Fahlman

Men's team épée

- Per Carleson, Carl Forssell, Bengt Ljungquist, Berndt-Otto Rehbinder, Sven Fahlman, Lennart Magnusson

Men's sabre

- Henry Nordin
- Bo Eriksson

== Football ==
Summary

Key:

- W – Win D – Draw L – Loss
- A.E.T – After extra time.
- RP – Game replayed

Team	Event	Primary round	First round	Quarterfinal	Semifinal	Final / BM	
Team	Event	Opposition Score	Opposition Score	Opposition Score	Opposition Score	Opposition Score	Rank
Sweden men's	Men's tournament	Bye	Norway; W 4–1	Austria; W 3–1	Hungary; L 0–6	West Germany; W 2–0	3rd place, bronze medalist(s)

== Modern pentathlon ==
Three male pentathletes represented Sweden in 1952. Lars Hall won gold in the individual event and all three pentathletes won silver in the team event.

Individual

- Lars Hall
- Thorsten Lindqvist
- Claes Egnell

Team

- Lars Hall
- Thorsten Lindqvist
- Claes Egnell

== Rowing ==
Sweden had 16 male rowers participate in four out of seven rowing events in 1952.

Men's double sculls

- Tore Johansson
- Curt Brunnqvist

Men's coxless pair

- Bernt Torberntsson
- Evert Gunnarsson

Men's coxed pair

- Ove Nilsson
- Ingemar Svensson
- Lars-Erik Larsson

Men's eight

- Lennart Andersson
- Frank Olsson
- John Niklasson
- Gösta Adamsson
- Ivan Simonsson
- Ragnar Ek
- Thore Börjesson
- Rune Andersson
- Sture Baatz

== Shooting ==
Ten shooters represented Sweden in 1952. Sweden won silver and bronze in the trap event and silver in the 100m running deer.

25 m pistol

- Gösta Pihl
- Torsten Ullman

50 m pistol

- Torsten Ullman
- Hugo Lundkvist

300 m rifle, three positions

- Holger Erbén
- Walther Fröstell

50 m rifle, three positions

- Uno Berg
- Walther Fröstell

50 m rifle, prone

- Walther Fröstell
- Uno Berg

100m running deer

- Olof Sköldberg
- Thorleif Kockgård

Trap

- Knut Holmqvist
- Hans Liljedahl

== Swimming ==
Men

Ranks given are within the heat.

Athlete	Event	Heat		Semifinal		Final	
Athlete	Event	Time	Rank	Time	Rank	Time	Rank
Olle Johansson	100 m freestyle	1:00.5	2	Did not advance			
Göran Larsson	100 m freestyle	57.5	1 Q	57.8	2 Q	58.2	3rd place, bronze medalist(s)
Lars Svantesson	100 m freestyle	1:01.4	5	Did not advance			
Per-Olof Östrand	400 m freestyle	4:38.6	1 Q	4:33.6	2 Q	4:35.2	3rd place, bronze medalist(s)
Bengt Rask	200 m breaststroke	2:45.3	4	Did not advance			
Lars Svantesson; Göran Larsson; Per-Olof Östrand; Olle Johansson; Rolf Olander	4 × 200 m freestyle	8:52.3	2	—N/a		8:46.8	4

Women

Ranks given are within the heat.

Athlete	Event	Heat		Semifinal		Final	
Athlete	Event	Time	Rank	Time	Rank	Time	Rank
Maud Berglund	100 m freestyle	1:09.8	3	Did not advance			
Ingegärd Fredin	100 m freestyle	1:08.0	4 Q	1:08.7	8	Did not advance	
Marianne Lundquist	100 m freestyle	1:10.8	4	Did not advance			
Ingegärd Fredin	400 m freestyle	5:28.7	4 Q	DNS		Did not advance	
Marianne Lundquist	400 m freestyle	5:34.4	5	Did not advance			
Margareta Westeson	100 m backstroke	1:22.7	6	Did not advance			
Ulla-Britt Eklund	200 m breaststroke	3:01.2	3 Q	2:59.6	4 Q	3:01.8	7
Marianne Lundquist; Anita Andersson; Maud Berglund; Ingegerd Fredin	4 × 100 m freestyle	4:38.1	3 Q	—N/a		4:39.0	6

== Water polo ==
Summary

Team	Event	Elimination round		First round				Semifinal				Final			Rank
Team	Event	Opposition Result	Opposition Result	Opposition Result	Opposition Result	Opposition Result	Rank	Opposition Result	Opposition Result	Opposition Result	Rank	Opposition Result	Opposition Result	Opposition Result	Rank
Sweden men	Men's tournament	United States; W 5–1	Bye	Netherlands; L 1–7	Argentina; W 7–2	Yugoslavia; L 1–9	3	Did not advance							11
