= Swimming at the 1952 Summer Olympics – Women's 100 metre backstroke =

Women's 100 metre backstroke at the Games of the XV Olympiad
- Venue: Helsinki Swimming Stadium
- Date: 29 July 1952 (heats); 31 July 1952 (final)
- Competitors: 29 from 14 nations
- Winning time: 1:14.3

Medalists
1st place, gold medalist(s)		Joan Harrison	South Africa
2nd place, silver medalist(s)		Geertje Wielema	Netherlands
3rd place, bronze medalist(s)		Jean Stewart	New Zealand

The women's 100 metre backstroke event at the 1952 Olympic Games took place on 29–31 July at the Swimming Stadium. This swimming event used the backstroke. Because an Olympic-size swimming pool is 50 metres long, this race consisted of two lengths of the pool.

== Results ==
=== Heats ===
Eight fastest swimmer advanced to the finals.

Heat 1

Rank	Athlete	Country	Time	Notes
1	Geertje Wielema	Netherlands	1:13.8	Q
2	Jean Stewart	New Zealand	1:16.0	Q
3	Margaret McDowell	Great Britain	1:17.5	Q
4	Barbara Stark	United States	1:17.9	Q
5	Gerda Olsen	Denmark	1:20.1	
6	Anneli Haaranen	Finland	1:21.7	

Heat 2

Rank	Athlete	Country	Time	Notes
1	Ria van der Horst	Netherlands	1:17.0	Q
2	Gertrud Herrbruck	Germany	1:17.8	Q
3	Mary Freeman	United States	1:18.0	
4	Edith de Oliveira	Brazil	1:20.0	
5	Lenora Fisher	Canada	1:22.9	
6	Irena Milnikiel	Poland	1:25.5	
7	Doris Gontersweiler-Vetterli	Switzerland	1:26.5	

Heat 3

Rank	Athlete	Country	Time	Notes
1	Joan Harrison	South Africa	1:14.7	Q
2	Joke de Korte	Netherlands	1:15.8	Q
3	Pauline Musgrave	Great Britain	1:19.6	
4	Magdolna Hunyadfy	Hungary	1:19.6	
5	Coralie O'Connor	United States	1:19.7	
6	Margareta Westeson	Sweden	1:22.7	
7	Erna Herbers	Germany	1:23.1	

=== Final ===
Rank	Athlete	Country	Time	Notes
1	Joan Harrison	South Africa	1:14.3	
2	Geertje Wielema	Netherlands	1:14.5	
3	Jean Stewart	New Zealand	1:15.8	
4	Joke de Korte	Netherlands	1:15.8	
5	Barbara Stark	United States	1:16.2	
6	Gertrud Herrbruck	Germany	1:18.0	
7	Margaret McDowell	Great Britain	1:18.4	
	Ria van der Horst	Netherlands	DSQ	

Key: DSQ = Disqualified
