= Water polo at the 1952 Summer Olympics =

Water polo at the Games of the XV Olympiad
- Venues: Helsinki Swimming Stadium
- Date: 25 July – 2 August 1952
- Competitors: 191 from 21 nations

Medalists
1st place, gold medalist(s)		Hungary
2nd place, silver medalist(s)		Yugoslavia
3rd place, bronze medalist(s)		Italy

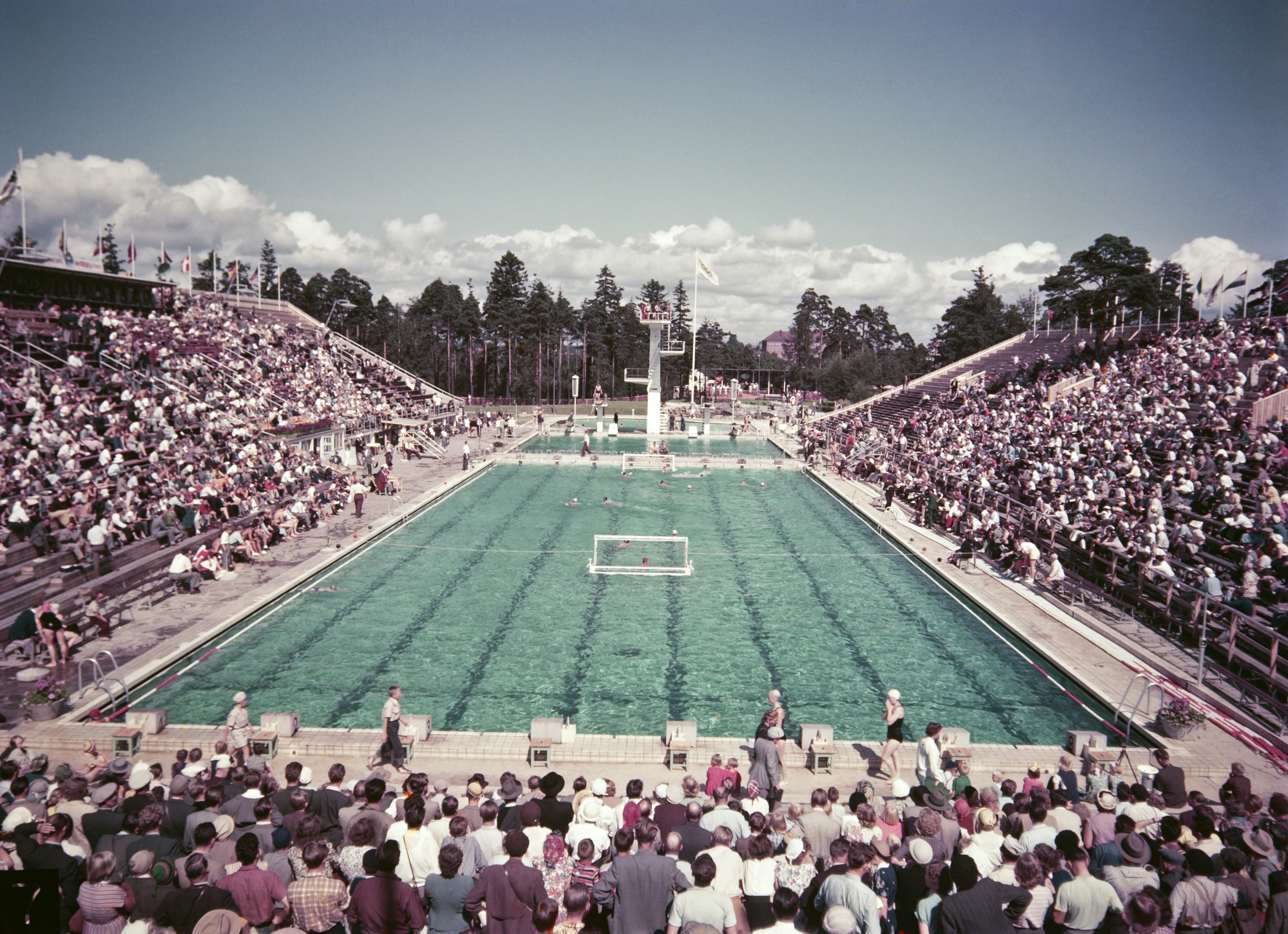
Helsinki Swimming Stadium hosted all matches

Final results for the water polo tournament at the 1952 Summer Olympics.

== Medal summary ==
Gold	Silver	Bronze
Hungary Róbert Antal; Antal Bolvári; Dezső Fábián; Dezső Gyarmati; István Hasznos; László Jeney; György Kárpáti; Dezső Lemhényi; Kálmán Markovits; Miklós Martin; Károly Szittya; István Szivós; György Vizvári	Yugoslavia Veljko Bakašun; Marko Brainović; Vladimir Ivković; Zdravko Ježić; Zdravko-Ćiro Kovačić; Ivo Kurtini; Lovro Radonjić; Ivo Štakula; Boško Vuksanović	Italy Gildo Arena; Lucio Ceccarini; Renato De Sanzuane; Raffaello Gambino; Salvatore Gionta; Maurizio Mannelli; Geminio Ognio; Carlo Peretti; Enzo Polito; Cesare Rubini; Renato Traiola

== Team squads ==
For the team rosters see: Water polo at the 1952 Summer Olympics – Men's team squads.

== Participating nations ==
- Argentina (10)
- Australia (10)
- Austria (11)
- Belgium (10)
- Brazil (11)
- Egypt (10)
- Germany (9)
- Great Britain (9)
- Hungary (13)
- India (10)
- Italy (11)
- Mexico (6)
- Netherlands (7)
- Portugal (9)
- Romania (8)
- South Africa (8)
- Soviet Union (13)
- Spain (8)
- Sweden (8)
- United States (11)
- Yugoslavia (11)

== Results ==
=== Eliminating rounds ===
In order to reduce the field from 21 teams to 16 for the round-robin pools, two eliminating rounds were used. The teams were drawn into 10 pairs, with one team (Argentina) drawing a bye through the eliminating rounds. The 10 winners of the first eliminating round advanced to the round robins, while the 10 losers were paired again for a second eliminating round. Again the winners advanced to the round robins; the 5 losers of this second eliminating round, however, were eliminated from competition.

==== First eliminating round ====
25 July 1952	OR p. 599	Hungary	13–4	Mexico	Helsinki Swimming Stadium; Referees: J. Curren (USA)
25 July 1952	OR p. 599	Scoring by half: 6–2, 7–2			Helsinki Swimming Stadium; Referees: J. Curren (USA)

25 July 1952	OR p. 599	Egypt	10–0	Portugal	Helsinki Swimming Stadium; Referees: E. J. Scott (GBR)
25 July 1952	OR p. 599	Scoring by half: 6–0, 4–0			Helsinki Swimming Stadium; Referees: E. J. Scott (GBR)

25 July 1952	OR p. 599	Germany	8–4	Romania	Helsinki Swimming Stadium; Referees: G. Voogd (NED)
25 July 1952	OR p. 599	Scoring by half: 4–1, 4–3			Helsinki Swimming Stadium; Referees: G. Voogd (NED)

25 July 1952	OR p. 599	Belgium	6–5	South Africa	Helsinki Swimming Stadium; Referees: F. Roggione (ITA)
25 July 1952	OR p. 599	Scoring by half: 4–3, 2–2			Helsinki Swimming Stadium; Referees: F. Roggione (ITA)

25 July 1952	OR p. 599	Yugoslavia	10–2	Australia	Helsinki Swimming Stadium; Referees: A. Weghofer (AUT)
25 July 1952	OR p. 599	Scoring by half: 4–1, 6–1			Helsinki Swimming Stadium; Referees: A. Weghofer (AUT)

25 July 1952	OR p. 599	Italy	16–1	India	Helsinki Swimming Stadium; Referees: V. Podjukivitsh (URS)
25 July 1952	OR p. 599	Scoring by half: 4–0, 12–1			Helsinki Swimming Stadium; Referees: V. Podjukivitsh (URS)

25 July 1952	OR p. 599	Spain	3–2	Brazil	Helsinki Swimming Stadium; Referees: H. Getz (RSA)
25 July 1952	OR p. 599	Scoring by half: 2–0, 1–2			Helsinki Swimming Stadium; Referees: H. Getz (RSA)

25 July 1952	OR p. 599	Great Britain	4–3	Austria	Helsinki Swimming Stadium; Referees: J. Bauwens (BEL)
25 July 1952	OR p. 599	Scoring by half: 3–2, 1–1			Helsinki Swimming Stadium; Referees: J. Bauwens (BEL)

25 July 1952	OR p. 599	Sweden	5–1	United States	Helsinki Swimming Stadium; Referees: T. Batalle (ESP)
25 July 1952	OR p. 599	Scoring by half: 2–1, 3–0			Helsinki Swimming Stadium; Referees: T. Batalle (ESP)

25 July 1952	OR p. 599	Netherlands	3–2	Soviet Union	Helsinki Swimming Stadium; Referees: S. Zukerman (SWE)
25 July 1952	OR p. 599	Scoring by half: 1–1, 2–1			Helsinki Swimming Stadium; Referees: S. Zukerman (SWE)

==== Second eliminating round ====
26 July 1952	OR p. 599	Austria	6–0	Australia	Helsinki Swimming Stadium; Referees: W. Baade (DEN)
26 July 1952	OR p. 599	Scoring by half: 4–0, 2–0			Helsinki Swimming Stadium; Referees: W. Baade (DEN)

26 July 1952	OR p. 599	Soviet Union	12–0	India	Helsinki Swimming Stadium; Referees: E. J. Scott (GBR)
26 July 1952	OR p. 599	Scoring by half: 5–0, 7–0			Helsinki Swimming Stadium; Referees: E. J. Scott (GBR)

26 July 1952	OR p. 599	South Africa	4–0	Mexico	Helsinki Swimming Stadium; Referees: V. Polic (YUG)
26 July 1952	OR p. 599	Scoring by half: 2–0, 2–0			Helsinki Swimming Stadium; Referees: V. Polic (YUG)

26 July 1952	OR p. 600	Brazil	6–2	Portugal	Helsinki Swimming Stadium; Referees: R. Honikman (RSA)
26 July 1952	OR p. 600	Scoring by half: 3–2, 3–0			Helsinki Swimming Stadium; Referees: R. Honikman (RSA)

26 July 1952	OR p. 600	United States	6–3	Romania	Helsinki Swimming Stadium; Referees: P. Barbieri (ITA)
26 July 1952	OR p. 600	Scoring by half: 2–1, 4–2			Helsinki Swimming Stadium; Referees: P. Barbieri (ITA)

=== First round ===
The first round consisted of the remaining 16 teams divided into 4 pools of 4 teams each. Each pool played a round robin. For wins, 2 standings points were awarded; draws were worth 1 and losses 0. The top two teams in each pool advanced.

==== Group A ====
Pos	Team	Pld	W	D	L	GF	GA	GD	Pts	Qualification
1	Italy	3	3	0	0	17	8	+9	6	Semifinals
2	United States	3	2	0	1	16	9	+7	4	Semifinals
3	Great Britain	3	0	1	2	9	15	−6	1	
4	Austria	3	0	1	2	5	15	−10	1	

Source: Official Report, p. 597
Rules for classification: 1) Points; 2) Head-to-head points; 3) Head-to-head goal difference; 4) Head-to-head goals scored; 5) Goal difference.

26 July 1952	OR p. 600	Italy	4–3	Great Britain	Helsinki Swimming Stadium; Referees: A. Delahaye (BEL)
26 July 1952	OR p. 600	Scoring by half: 2–0, 2–3			Helsinki Swimming Stadium; Referees: A. Delahaye (BEL)

27 July 1952	OR p. 600	Italy	8–1	Austria	Helsinki Swimming Stadium; Referees: J. Bauwens (BEL)
27 July 1952	OR p. 600	Scoring by half: 4–0, 4–1			Helsinki Swimming Stadium; Referees: J. Bauwens (BEL)

27 July 1952	OR p. 600	United States	8–3	Great Britain	Helsinki Swimming Stadium; Referees: B. Rajki (HUN)
27 July 1952	OR p. 600	Scoring by half: 3–2, 5–1			Helsinki Swimming Stadium; Referees: B. Rajki (HUN)

27 July 1952	OR p. 603	Great Britain	3–3	Austria	Helsinki Swimming Stadium; Referees: V. Podjukivitsh (URS)
27 July 1952	OR p. 603	Scoring by half: 0–3, 3–0			Helsinki Swimming Stadium; Referees: V. Podjukivitsh (URS)

27 July 1952	OR p. 603	Italy	5–4	United States	Helsinki Swimming Stadium; Referees: B. Rajki (HUN)
27 July 1952	OR p. 603	Scoring by half: 3–2, 2–2			Helsinki Swimming Stadium; Referees: B. Rajki (HUN)

29 July 1952	OR p. 603	United States	4–1	Austria	Helsinki Swimming Stadium; Referees: W. Baade (DEN)
29 July 1952	OR p. 603	Scoring by half: 2–1, 2–0			Helsinki Swimming Stadium; Referees: W. Baade (DEN)

==== Group B ====
Pos	Team	Pld	W	D	L	GF	GA	GD	Pts	Qualification
1	Hungary	3	3	0	0	23	4	+19	6	Semifinals
2	Soviet Union	3	2	0	1	12	9	+3	4	Semifinals
3	Egypt	3	1	0	2	7	14	−7	2	
4	Germany	3	0	0	3	5	20	−15	0	

Source: Official Report, p. 597
Rules for classification: 1) Points; 2) Head-to-head points; 3) Head-to-head goal difference; 4) Head-to-head goals scored; 5) Goal difference.

26 July 1952	OR p. 600	Hungary	9–0	Egypt	Helsinki Swimming Stadium; Referees: G. Rigal (FRA)
26 July 1952	OR p. 600	Scoring by half: 6–0, 3–0			Helsinki Swimming Stadium; Referees: G. Rigal (FRA)

27 July 1952	OR p. 600	Egypt	5–2	Germany	Helsinki Swimming Stadium; Referees: F. Roggione (ITA)
27 July 1952	OR p. 600	Scoring by half: 1–1, 4–1			Helsinki Swimming Stadium; Referees: F. Roggione (ITA)

27 July 1952	OR p. 600	Hungary	5–3	Soviet Union	Helsinki Swimming Stadium; Referees: S. Zuckerman (SWE)
27 July 1952	OR p. 600	Scoring by half: 1–2, 4–1			Helsinki Swimming Stadium; Referees: S. Zuckerman (SWE)

27 July 1952	OR p. 603	Soviet Union	3–2	Egypt	Helsinki Swimming Stadium; Referees: A. Weghofer (AUT)
27 July 1952	OR p. 603	Scoring by half: 1–1, 2–1			Helsinki Swimming Stadium; Referees: A. Weghofer (AUT)

27 July 1952	OR p. 603	Hungary	9–1	Germany	Helsinki Swimming Stadium; Referees: G. Rigal (FRA)
27 July 1952	OR p. 603	Scoring by half: 3–0, 6–1			Helsinki Swimming Stadium; Referees: G. Rigal (FRA)

29 July 1952	OR p. 603	Soviet Union	6–2	Germany	Helsinki Swimming Stadium; Referees: G. Voogd (NED)
29 July 1952	OR p. 603	Scoring by half: 3–1, 3–1			Helsinki Swimming Stadium; Referees: G. Voogd (NED)

==== Group C ====
The first match between the Netherlands and Yugoslavia was won by the Dutch, 3–2, but successfully protested by Yugoslavia on the grounds that the "referee in this match had shown incompetency." FINA invalidated the match and ordered a replay. Because the results of the match were not necessary to determine qualification for the semifinals (both teams would advance regardless), and because the two teams were drawn into the same semifinal group, the replay was not held until the semifinal round though Yugoslavia's 2–1 win ultimately counted in the standings for the first round group.

Pos	Team	Pld	W	D	L	GF	GA	GD	Pts	Qualification
1	Yugoslavia	3	3	0	0	20	3	+17	6	Semifinals
2	Netherlands	3	2	0	1	17	6	+11	4	Semifinals
3	Sweden	3	1	0	2	9	18	−9	2	
4	Argentina	3	0	0	3	6	25	−19	0	

Source: Official Report, p. 597
Rules for classification: 1) Points; 2) Head-to-head points; 3) Head-to-head goal difference; 4) Head-to-head goals scored; 5) Goal difference.

26 July 1952	OR p. 600	Netherlands	9–3	Argentina	Helsinki Swimming Stadium; Referees: F. Dahmen (GER)
26 July 1952	OR p. 600	Scoring by half: 6–1, 3–2			Helsinki Swimming Stadium; Referees: F. Dahmen (GER)

27 July 1952	OR p. 600	Yugoslavia	9–1	Argentina	Helsinki Swimming Stadium; Referees: G. Rigal (FRA)
27 July 1952	OR p. 600	Scoring by half: 4–1, 5–0			Helsinki Swimming Stadium; Referees: G. Rigal (FRA)

27 July 1952	OR p. 600	Netherlands	7–1	Sweden	Helsinki Swimming Stadium; Referees: T. Batalle (ESP)
27 July 1952	OR p. 600	Scoring by half: 3–0, 4–1			Helsinki Swimming Stadium; Referees: T. Batalle (ESP)

27 July 1952	OR p. 603	Sweden	7–2	Argentina	Helsinki Swimming Stadium; Referees: E. J. Scott (GBR)
27 July 1952	OR p. 603	Scoring by half: 3–2, 4–0			Helsinki Swimming Stadium; Referees: E. J. Scott (GBR)

1 August 1952	OR p. 604	Netherlands	1–2	Yugoslavia	Helsinki Swimming Stadium; Referees: S. Zuckerman (SWE)
1 August 1952	OR p. 604	Scoring by half: 0–2, 1–0			Helsinki Swimming Stadium; Referees: S. Zuckerman (SWE)

29 July 1952	OR p. 603	Yugoslavia	9–1	Sweden	Helsinki Swimming Stadium; Referees: J. Bauwens (BEL)
29 July 1952	OR p. 603	Scoring by half: 4–1, 5–0			Helsinki Swimming Stadium; Referees: J. Bauwens (BEL)

==== Group D ====
Pos	Team	Pld	W	D	L	GF	GA	GD	Pts	Qualification
1	Belgium	3	3	0	0	12	5	+7	6	Semifinals
2	Spain	3	2	0	1	13	10	+3	4	Semifinals
3	South Africa	3	1	0	2	10	9	+1	2	
4	Brazil	3	0	0	3	7	18	−11	0	

Source: Official Report, p. 597
Rules for classification: 1) Points; 2) Head-to-head points; 3) Head-to-head goal difference; 4) Head-to-head goals scored; 5) Goal difference.

26 July 1952	OR p. 600	Belgium	5–4	Spain	Helsinki Swimming Stadium; Referees: B. Rajki (HUN)
26 July 1952	OR p. 600	Scoring by half: 3–2, 2–2			Helsinki Swimming Stadium; Referees: B. Rajki (HUN)

27 July 1952	OR p. 600	Spain	3–1	South Africa	Helsinki Swimming Stadium; Referees: D. Grimaldi (ITA)
27 July 1952	OR p. 600	Scoring by half: 1–0, 2–1			Helsinki Swimming Stadium; Referees: D. Grimaldi (ITA)

27 July 1952	OR p. 600	Belgium	3–1	Brazil	Helsinki Swimming Stadium; Referees: G. Voogd (NED)
27 July 1952	OR p. 600	Scoring by half: 1–0, 2–1			Helsinki Swimming Stadium; Referees: G. Voogd (NED)

27 July 1952	OR p. 603	Spain	6–4	Brazil	Helsinki Swimming Stadium; Referees: Y. Ezzeldin (EGY)
27 July 1952	OR p. 603	Scoring by half: 4–1, 2–3			Helsinki Swimming Stadium; Referees: Y. Ezzeldin (EGY)

27 July 1952	OR p. 603	Belgium	4–0	South Africa	Helsinki Swimming Stadium; Referees: S. Zuckerman (SWE)
27 July 1952	OR p. 603	Scoring by half: 2–0, 2–0			Helsinki Swimming Stadium; Referees: S. Zuckerman (SWE)

29 July 1952	OR p. 603	South Africa	9–2	Brazil	Helsinki Swimming Stadium; Referees: J. Kitajef (URS)
29 July 1952	OR p. 603	Scoring by half: 3–0, 6–2			Helsinki Swimming Stadium; Referees: J. Kitajef (URS)

=== Semifinals ===
The 8 semifinalist teams were again divided into pools of 4 teams each. Each pool played a round robin, with the results of the first round games between teams from the same first round pool counting for the semifinals as well. For wins, 2 standings points were awarded; draws were worth 1 and losses 0. The top two teams in each pool advanced to the final; the bottom 2 teams moved to the 5th–8th place classification round.

==== Semifinal E ====
The results of the first round Italy–United States and Belgium–Spain matches counted for the semifinal pool.

Pos	Team	Pld	W	D	L	GF	GA	GD	Pts	Qualification
1	Italy	3	3	0	0	12	6	+6	6	Final
2	United States	3	2	0	1	14	11	+3	4	Final
3	Belgium	3	1	0	2	8	13	−5	2	Classification 5–8
4	Spain	3	0	0	3	9	13	−4	0	Classification 5–8

Source: Official Report, p. 598
Rules for classification: 1) Points; 2) Head-to-head points; 3) Head-to-head goal difference; 4) Head-to-head goals scored; 5) Goal difference.

30 July 1952	OR p. 604	United States	4–2	Belgium	Helsinki Swimming Stadium; Referees: A. Weghofer (AUT)
30 July 1952	OR p. 604	Scoring by half: 4–1, 0–1			Helsinki Swimming Stadium; Referees: A. Weghofer (AUT)

30 July 1952	OR p. 604	Italy	2–1	Spain	Helsinki Swimming Stadium; Referees: V. Polic (YUG)
30 July 1952	OR p. 604	Scoring by half: 1–1, 1–0			Helsinki Swimming Stadium; Referees: V. Polic (YUG)

31 July 1952	OR p. 604	Italy	5–1	Belgium	Helsinki Swimming Stadium; Referees: V. Podjukivitsch (URS)
31 July 1952	OR p. 604	Scoring by half: 2–0, 3–1			Helsinki Swimming Stadium; Referees: V. Podjukivitsch (URS)

31 July 1952	OR p. 604	United States	6–4	Spain	Helsinki Swimming Stadium; Referees: G. Voogd (NED)
31 July 1952	OR p. 604	Scoring by half: 2–2, 4–2			Helsinki Swimming Stadium; Referees: G. Voogd (NED)

==== Semifinal F ====
The results of the first round match between Hungary and the Soviet Union were counted as part of the semifinal round robin. The first-round match between the Netherlands and Yugoslavia had been invalidated due to a successful protest. The replay of that match took place at the end of the semifinal pool and was effectively an elimination match: the winner would join Hungary in advancing to the final, with the loser moving to the classification round. The Netherlands would advance if the match were drawn. In the replay, Yugoslavia took a 2–1 decision to advance and eliminate the Netherlands.

Pos	Team	Pld	W	D	L	GF	GA	GD	Pts	Qualification
1	Hungary	3	1	2	0	11	9	+2	4	Final
2	Yugoslavia	3	1	2	0	7	6	+1	4	Final
3	Netherlands	3	1	1	1	9	8	+1	3	Classification 5–8
4	Soviet Union	3	0	1	2	8	12	−4	1	Classification 5–8

Source: Official Report, p. 598
Rules for classification: 1) Points; 2) Head-to-head points; 3) Head-to-head goal difference; 4) Head-to-head goals scored; 5) Goal difference.

30 July 1952	OR p. 604	Netherlands	4–4	Hungary	Helsinki Swimming Stadium; Referees: F. Roggione (ITA)
30 July 1952	OR p. 604	Scoring by half: 1–3, 3–1			Helsinki Swimming Stadium; Referees: F. Roggione (ITA)

30 July 1952	OR p. 604	Soviet Union	3–3	Yugoslavia	Helsinki Swimming Stadium; Referees: T. Batalle (ESP)
30 July 1952	OR p. 604	Scoring by half: 2–1, 1–2			Helsinki Swimming Stadium; Referees: T. Batalle (ESP)

31 July 1952	OR p. 604	Yugoslavia	2–2	Hungary	Helsinki Swimming Stadium; Referees: J. Bauwens (BEL)
31 July 1952	OR p. 604	Scoring by half: 1–1, 1–1			Helsinki Swimming Stadium; Referees: J. Bauwens (BEL)

31 July 1952	OR p. 604	Netherlands	4–2	Soviet Union	Helsinki Swimming Stadium; Referees: D. Grimaldi (ITA)
31 July 1952	OR p. 604	Scoring by half: 2–0, 2–2			Helsinki Swimming Stadium; Referees: D. Grimaldi (ITA)

=== Finals ===
The 4 finalists played one more round robin. For wins, 2 standings points were awarded; draws were worth 1 and losses 0. There was also a classification pool for the semifinal losers.

==== Final ====
The first round game between Italy and the United States and the semifinal match between Yugoslavia and Hungary counted for the final pool.

Pos	Team	Pld	W	D	L	GF	GA	GD	Pts
1	Hungary	3	2	1	0	13	4	+9	5
2	Yugoslavia	3	2	1	0	9	5	+4	5
3	Italy	3	1	0	2	8	14	−6	2
4	United States	3	0	0	3	6	13	−7	0

Source: Official Report, p. 598
Rules for classification: 1) Points; 2) Head-to-head points; 3) Head-to-head goal difference; 4) Head-to-head goals scored; 5) Goal difference.

1 August 1952	OR p. 604	Hungary	7–2	Italy	Helsinki Swimming Stadium; Referees: G. Rigal
1 August 1952	OR p. 604	Scoring by half: 2–2, 5–0			Helsinki Swimming Stadium; Referees: G. Rigal

1 August 1952	OR p. 604	Yugoslavia	4–2	United States	Helsinki Swimming Stadium; Referees: J. Bauwens (BEL)
1 August 1952	OR p. 604	Scoring by half: 2–1, 2–1			Helsinki Swimming Stadium; Referees: J. Bauwens (BEL)

2 August 1952	OR p. 605	Yugoslavia	3–1	Italy	Helsinki Swimming Stadium; Referees: T. Batalle (ESP)
2 August 1952	OR p. 605	Scoring by half: 0–1, 3–0			Helsinki Swimming Stadium; Referees: T. Batalle (ESP)

2 August 1952	OR p. 605	Hungary	4–0	United States	Helsinki Swimming Stadium; Referees: S. Zuckerman (SWE)
2 August 1952	OR p. 605	Scoring by half: 3–0, 1–0			Helsinki Swimming Stadium; Referees: S. Zuckerman (SWE)

==== Classification round 5–8 ====
The first round match between Belgium and Spain and the semifinal match between the Netherlands and the Soviet Union counted for the classification pool.

Pos	Team	Pld	W	D	L	GF	GA	GD	Pts
5	Netherlands	3	3	0	0	16	6	+10	6
6	Belgium	3	1	1	1	11	12	−1	3
7	Soviet Union	3	1	1	1	9	10	−1	3
8	Spain	3	0	0	3	8	16	−8	0

Source: Official Report, p. 598
Rules for classification: 1) Points; 2) Head-to-head points; 3) Head-to-head goal difference; 4) Head-to-head goals scored; 5) Goal difference.

1 August 1952	OR p. 604	Soviet Union	4–3	Spain	Helsinki Swimming Stadium; Referees: E. J. Scott
1 August 1952	OR p. 604	Scoring by half: 2–2, 2–1			Helsinki Swimming Stadium; Referees: E. J. Scott

1 August 1952	OR p. 604	Netherlands	5–3	Belgium	Helsinki Swimming Stadium; Referees: F. Roggione (ITA)
1 August 1952	OR p. 604	Scoring by half: 2–2, 3–1			Helsinki Swimming Stadium; Referees: F. Roggione (ITA)

2 August 1952	OR p. 605	Netherlands	7–1	Spain	Helsinki Swimming Stadium; Referees: F. Roggione (ITA)
2 August 1952	OR p. 605	Scoring by half: 4–0, 3–1			Helsinki Swimming Stadium; Referees: F. Roggione (ITA)

2 August 1952	OR p. 605	Belgium	3–3	Soviet Union	Helsinki Swimming Stadium; Referees: G. Rigal (FRA)
2 August 1952	OR p. 605	Scoring by half: 2–3, 1–0			Helsinki Swimming Stadium; Referees: G. Rigal (FRA)

== Final standings ==
Place	Nation
1	Hungary
2	Yugoslavia
3	Italy
4	United States
5	Netherlands
6	Belgium
7	Soviet Union
8	Spain
9	Brazil
10	Egypt
11	Sweden
12	Great Britain
13	Austria
14	South Africa
15	Germany
16	Argentina
17	Romania
18	Mexico
19	Australia
20	Portugal
21	India

== Sources ==
- PDF documents in the LA84 Foundation Digital Library:
  - Official Report of the 1952 Olympic Games (download, archive) (pp. 600–608)
- Water polo on the Olympedia website
  - Water polo at the 1952 Summer Olympics (men's tournament)
- Water polo on the Sports Reference website
  - Water polo at the 1952 Summer Games (men's tournament) (archived)
