= Twardokens =

Twardokens is a surname. Notable people with the surname include:

- Eva Twardokens (born 1965), American alpine ski racer
- Jerzy Twardokens (1931–2015), Polish fencer
