= Sobrero =

Sobrero is an Italian surname. Notable people with the surname include:

- Ascanio Sobrero (1812–1888), Italian chemist
- Giorgio Sobrero (1930–2017), Italian sprinter
- Matteo Sobrero (born 1997), Italian cyclist
- Rubén Sobrero (born 1961), Argentinian trade unionist
