= Gionta =

Gionta is an Italian surname. Notable people with the surname include:

- Brian Gionta (born 1979), American ice hockey player
- Salvatore Gionta (1930–2025), Italian water polo player
- Stephen Gionta (born 1983), American ice hockey player, brother of Brian
