= Barbara Stark =

American swimmer (born 1937)

- Stark circa 1956 in Olympic sweater

Personal information
- Full name: Barbara Lynn Stark
- National team: United States
- Born: July 6, 1937 (age 89) Berkeley, California, U.S.
- Died: June 17, 2026 (aged 88) Piedmont, California
- Education: University of California Berkeley (1959)
- Occupations: Banking, Real Estate Management; Swim Coach U. Berkeley
- Spouse: Frank Jordan (1958)
- Children: 2
- Relatives: Jonathan Stark, nephew Hartwell Jordan, Olympian, son

Sport
- Sport: Swimming
- Strokes: Backstroke
- Club: Berkeley Women's City Swim Club

Barbara Lynn Stark (born July 6, 1937), also known by her married name Barbara Jordan, is an American former competition swimmer who competed in the women's 100-meter backstroke at the 1952 Helsinki Olympics, finishing fifth.

== Early life ==
Stark was born July 6, 1937 in Berkeley, California, to Dr. Roger Stark and mother Barbara Stark, and had a brother Deek. She attended Acalanes High School, in the San Francisco Bay area, graduating around 1955. She was raised by her stepmother Helen Stark, who married her father, after her mother Barbara died from a fall in 1941. By 14, Barbara swam for the Berkeley Women's City Swim Club.

In 1953, Stark won the 110 yard backstroke distance, becoming an AAU outdoor backstroke champion. In 1953-4, she won the 220 yard distance for the AAU outdoor backstroke championships. In Indoor competition in 1952, she captured the AAU championship in the 100-yard backstroke in National record time. From 1952-1954, she won the 200-yard backstroke indoor competition.

== 1952 Olympic trials ==
Stark qualified in the 100-meter backstroke final at the 1952 Olympic trials in Indianapolis by placing second with a time of 1:18.5, to Mary Freeman who edged her out in the finish with a time of 1:17.9. Stark led Freeman until the last 30 meters of the race, and was hampered by hitting a lane line near the races end that slowed her pace slightly.

== 1952 Helsinki Olympics ==
Stark competed at the age of 15 in the women's 100-meter backstroke, at the 1952 Olympics at the Swimming Stadium in Helsinki, Finland. A day prior to the competition, she cut her head on a glass door after slipping in a locker room, and was treated with stitches. Despite her injury, she competed with a swimming cap on the day of the Olympic preliminary rounds and advanced to the event final, finishing fifth with a time of 1:16.2, putting her only .4 seconds away from contending for a bronze medal. Geertje Wielema of Holland, despite having suffered from anaemia prior to the Games, was the pre-game favorite for the event.In a close race with Wielema, Joan Harrison of South Africa managed to win the gold with a time of 1:14.3, Wielema of the Netherlands taking the silver with a time of 1:14.5, and Jean Stewart of New Zealand taking the bronze with a time of 1:15.8.

=== Later life and family ===
After graduating High School in 1955, Stark retired from competitive swimming and attended the University of California Berkeley. While attending UC Berkeley, she was a member of Kappa Kappa Gamma. She met her husband, Frank at Berkeley, marrying in 1958, and graduated from Berkeley the following year. Barbara and Frank had a son, Hartwell Jordan, who competed in sailing (Soling) at the 2000 Olympic Games in Sydney. The couple also had a daughter Betsy, and several grandchildren. and a daughter, who they raised in Piedmont, California. Remaining active in the swimming community, she remained fit and active training and competing with U.S. Masters Swimming and spent a year coaching the U.C. Berkeley swim team from 1976-1977. After a 1978 divorce, she worked as a Teller at Crocker Bank, now Wells Fargo. She eventually ascended to the role of a Vice President at Real Property Management,

Remaining active in swimming, in 1971 and 1974-75 in the 100m and 200m backstroke age group competition for 50 year olds, she became the United States Masters World Swimming Championship at the Masters World Meet in Brisbane, California.

Her nephew, Jonathan Stark, is a former professional tennis player.

=== Retirement years ===
She moved to Rossmoor, a retirement community in Walnut Creek, California in 2006 where she enjoyed golf and was active in her community. community service during this period, she served on the board of the Golden Rain Foundation, a nonprofit that managed retirement communties, that included her own Rossmoor in Walnut Creek as well as Laguna Woods Village, and Leisure World Seal Beach. She last lived in the Revel Folsom retirement community in Granite Bay, California where she had moved in 2023, and enjoyed a vibrant lifestyle until her death. Following injuries resulting from a fall, Barbara Stark Jordan died peacefully at 86 in Granite Bay, California on June 17, 2026.

=== Honors ===
She became a member of the California Athletics Hall of Fame in 1984.
