= New Cemetery =

New Cemetery may refer to:

- New Cemetery, Belgrade, Serbia
- New Cemetery, Galway, Ireland
