= Erna Herbers =

German swimmer (1925–2025)

Personal information
- Born: 2 May 1925 Amsterdam, Netherlands
- Died: 7 February 2025 (aged 99) Hilden, Germany

Sport
- Sport: Swimming
- Club: Undine Mönchen-Gladbach; ETV – Hamburg

Erna Herbers (née Westhelle; 2 May 1925 – 7 February 2025) was a German swimmer. She competed at the 1952 Summer Olympics in the 100 m backstroke event, but failed to reach the final. In 1948 she won the German 100 m backstroke title, but missed the 1948 Olympics because Germany was excluded from them.

== Biography ==
Erna Westhelle was born in Amsterdam, the Netherlands, and grew up in Hilversum, where she started swimming aged 12. Her family had bonds with Germany, as her father was German and was employed by a German company. Westhelle herself worked as a stenographer at a Waffen-SS office in Hilversum and competed for the German club Undine Mönchen-Gladbach. In 1943 she won the German 100 m backstroke title, for which she received a personal present from the SS-Gruppenführer Karl Maria Demelhuber. During World War II she met her future husband and in 1945 moved with him to Germany; there she changed her last name to Herbers. She retired from swimming in 1953, and in 1970 moved to Hilden, a town near the German-Dutch border.

Herbers died in Hilden, Germany on 7 February 2025, at the age of 99.
