= KLM Flight 607-E =

1958 crash of a Lockheed Super Constellation

Coordinates: 53°12′30″N 11°53′00″W

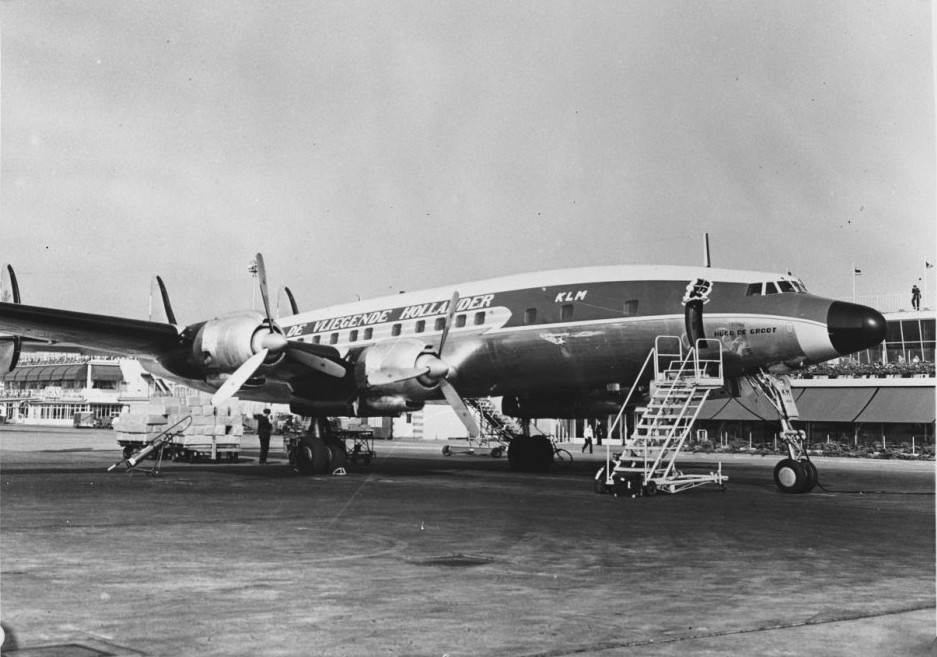
- PH-LKM, the aircraft involved in the accident.

Accident
- Date: 14 August 1958
- Summary: Undetermined
- Site: Atlantic Ocean (110 mi due west of Galway, Ireland)

Aircraft
- Aircraft type: Lockheed L-1049H-01-06-162 Super Constellation
- Aircraft name: Hugo de Groot
- Operator: KLM
- Call sign: KLM 607-ECHO
- Registration: PH-LKM
- Flight origin: Amsterdam Schiphol Airport
- 1st stopover: Shannon Airport, Ireland
- Last stopover: Gander International Airport, Newfoundland
- Destination: Idlewild Airport, New York
- Occupants: 99
- Passengers: 91
- Crew: 8
- Fatalities: 99
- Survivors: 0

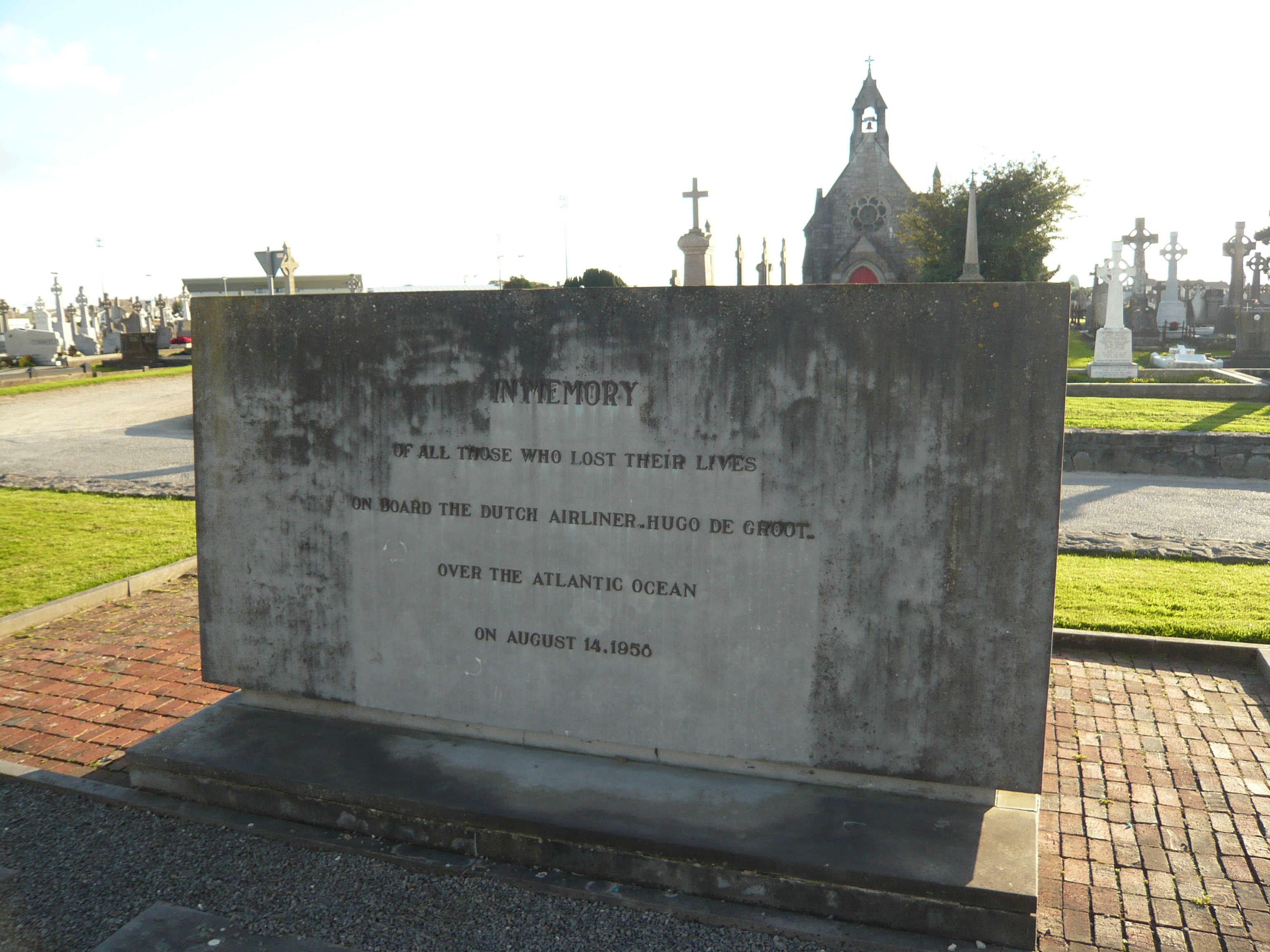
KLM Flight 607-E memorial in Bohermore Cemetery, Galway

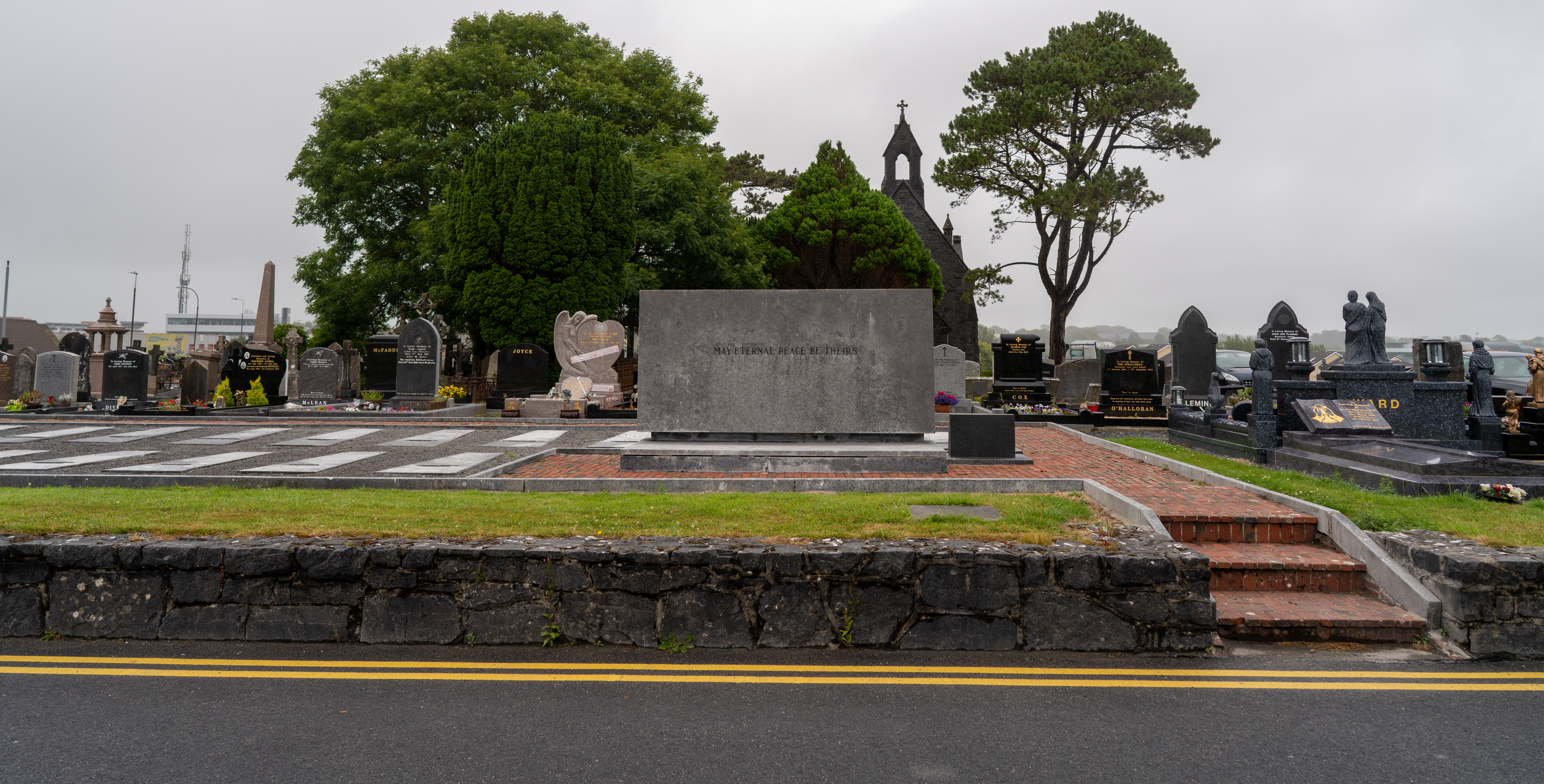
KLM Flight 607-E disaster graves in Bohermore Cemetery, Galway

KLM Flight 607-E was an international scheduled flight that crashed on 14 August 1958, after taking off from Shannon Airport, Ireland. The aircraft was a Lockheed Super Constellation. All 99 on board died, making the crash the deadliest civil aviation disaster involving a single aircraft at the time, and the deadliest crash involving the Lockheed Constellation series, until the disappearance of Flying Tiger Line Flight 739 in 1962.

== Accident ==
The airplane was named Hugo de Groot and registered as PH-LKM. The "E" in the flight number stood for the designation of being an extra economy class flight to match the increased seasonal tourist demand.

All ninety-one passengers and eight crew died in the accident, including six members of the Egyptian fencing team (Osman Abdel Hafeez, Mohamed Ali Riad, Ahmed Sabry, et al.) and the Hungarian fencer Endre Tilli.

Flight 607-E departed Shannon at 03:05 UTC on the second leg of a transatlantic trip from Amsterdam, Netherlands to New York City, US with intermediate stops in Shannon and Gander, Newfoundland. Radio contact with the aircraft was lost at approximately 03:40 UTC; a rescue operation was launched which found light debris on the surface of the ocean approximately 180 kilometres (110 mi) northwest of Shannon. The remains of thirty-four of those on board were also recovered.

== Investigation ==
Due to the lack of evidence, Irish and Dutch investigators could not pinpoint a probable cause for the accident. They examined the possibility of a bomb, electrical failure, or pilot error, but believed that the most likely possibility was a catastrophic mechanical failure.

The investigating board believed the most likely cause of the accident to be a malfunctioning over-speeding outboard propeller caused by metal particles obstructing oil feed line regulator valves. The particles may have been formed by a gear that was damaged when the supercharger of the corresponding engine was accelerated (gear ratio shifted). The malfunctions of the propeller pitch might have provoked a flight disturbance and as a consequence the propeller may have sheared off.

== See also ==
- Aviation safety
- List of accidents and incidents involving commercial aircraft
- List of accidents involving sports teams
