= Giovanni Azzini =

Italian footballer

Personal information
- Date of birth: 28 September 1929
- Place of birth: Quinzano d'Oglio, Italy
- Date of death: 4 June 1994 (aged 64)
- Place of death: Cremona, Italy
- Height: 1.79 m (5 ft 10 1/2 in)
- Position: Midfielder

Senior career*
Years	Team	Apps	(Gls)
1948–1955	Brescia	160	(1)
1955–1958	Padova	90	(1)
1958–1960	banned		
1960–1962	Padova	62	(1)
1962–1963	Brescia	7	(0)

International career
1952	Italy	1	(0)
- * Club domestic league appearances and goals

Giovanni Azzini (Italian pronunciation: [dʒoˈvanni atˈtsiːni]; 28 September 1929 – 4 June 1994) was an Italian footballer who played as a midfielder.

== Club career ==
Azzini played for 5 seasons (152 games, 2 goals) in the Serie A for Calcio Padova.

=== Match-fixing accusations ===
Azzini is mostly remembered for being accused of fixing a game that his team Padova lost 0–3 to Atalanta B.C. on 30 March 1958. He maintained that the key witness, his ex-girlfriend Silveria Marchesini, was lying as revenge for him leaving her. Nevertheless, he was found guilty and banned from football for life. The ban was later reduced to 2 years on appeal.

== International career ==
Azzini played his only game for the Italy national football team on 21 July 1952, against Hungary, during the 1952 Summer Olympics.
