= Hartwell Jordan =

Olympic sailor from the United States

Personal information
- Full name: Hartwell F. Jordan
- Nationality: United States
- Born: December 8, 1961 (age 64) Oakland, California, U.S.
- Height: 6 ft 0 in (183 cm)
- Weight: 185 lb (84 kg)

Sport

Sailing career
- Class: Soling
- Club: San Francisco Yacht Club
- Updated on March 1, 2020

Hartwell F. Jordan (born December 8, 1961) is a sailor from Oakland, California, United States. who represented his country at the 2000 Summer Olympics in Sydney, Australia as crew member in the Soling. With helmsman Jeff Madrigali and fellow crew member Craig Healy they took the 9th place.

His mother, Barbara Stark (Jordan), competed in swimming at the 1952 Olympic Games in Helsinki.
