= Amos Cardarelli =

Italian footballer (1930-2018)

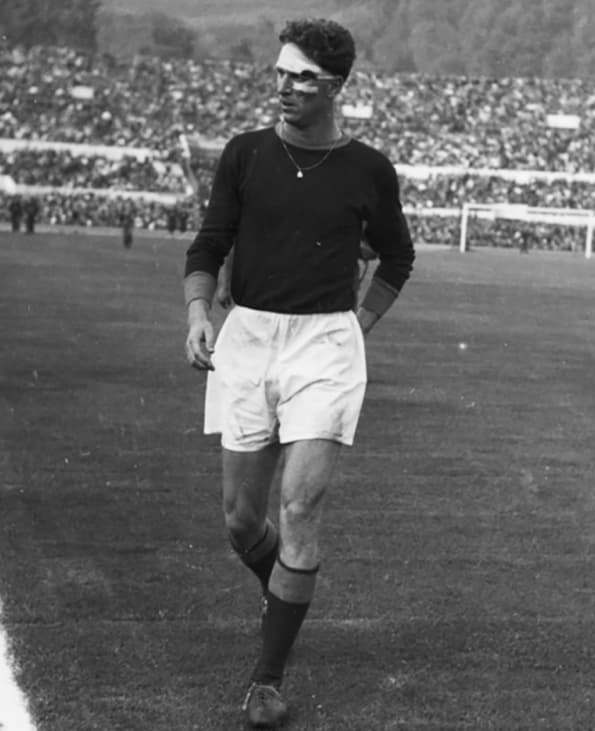
- Cardarelli with A.S. Roma in the 1950s

Personal information
- Date of birth: 6 March 1930
- Place of birth: Monterotondo, Italy
- Date of death: 1 July 2018 (aged 88)
- Place of death: Rome, Italy
- Height: 1.86 m (6 ft 1 in)
- Position: Defender

Senior career*
Years	Team	Apps	(Gls)
1950–1957	Roma	157	(3)
1957–1958	Udinese	29	(0)
1958–1960	Internazionale	51	(0)
1960–1962	Lecco	59	(1)
1962–1963	Tevere Roma	22	(0)

Managerial career
- 1970–1971: Palestrina
- 1972–1973: S.T.E.F.E.R. Roma
- 1974–1975: Frosinone
- 1977–1980: ALMAS
- 1981–1982: Banco di Roma
- * Club domestic league appearances and goals

Amos Cardarelli (6 March 1930 – 1 July 2018) was an Italian professional footballer who played as a defender.

== Honours ==
=== Player ===
==== Club ====
Roma

- Serie B (1): 1951–52

==== International ====
- Represented Italy at the 1952 Summer Olympics.

=== Manager ===
ALMAS

- Serie D (1): 1977–78
