= Jacques Noël =

French fencer (1920–2004)

Personal information
- Born: 6 April 1920
- Died: 7 October 2004 (aged 84)

Sport
- Sport: Fencing
Medal record
Men's fencing
Representing France
Olympic Games
Gold medal – first place	1952 Helsinki	Foil, team
Mediterranean Games
Silver medal – second place	1951 Alexandria	Team foil

Jacques Noël (6 April 1920 – 7 October 2004) was a French fencer. He won a gold medal in the team foil event at the 1952 Summer Olympics. He also competed at the 1951 Mediterranean Games where he won a silver medal in the team foil event.
