= Kumpula Outdoor Swimming Pool =

Swimming pool in Helsinki, Finland

Coordinates: 60°12′31″N 24°57′29″E

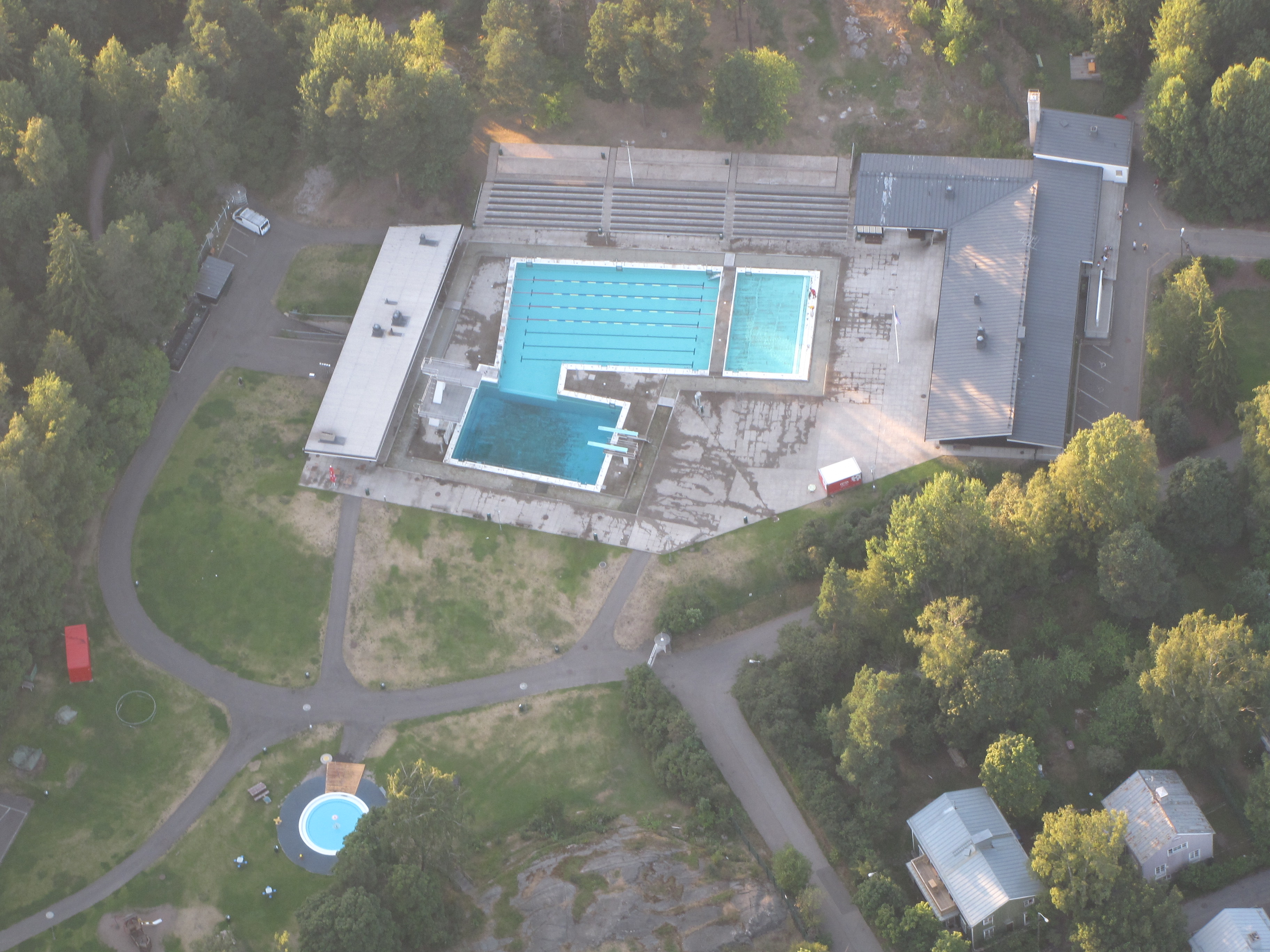
Kumpula outdoor swimming pool from the air

The Kumpula Outdoor Swimming Pool is an outdoor swimming pool located in Kumpula, Helsinki. The swimming pool was built as a practice pool for the 1952 Summer Olympics and it is Finland's third oldest outdoor swimming pool. In 2005, the swimming pool was restored to its original appearance while the saunas and dressing rooms were modernized at the same time.

The pool is open from the end of May until the end of August. The pool is popular with locals and tourists alike: it was visited by some 130,000 people in the summer 2013.

== See also ==
- Helsinki Swimming Stadium
