= Ahmed Sabry (fencer) =

Egyptian fencer

Personal information
- Full name: Ahmed Ismail Sabry
- Nationality: Egyptian
- Born: Ahmed Sabry; 15 September 1933 Cairo
- Died: 14 August 1958 (aged 24) KLM Flight 607-E - Hugo de Groot plane crash

Sport
- Country: Egypt
- Sport: Fencing

Ahmed Sabry (15 September 1933 – 14 August 1958) was an Egyptian fencing champion. He was one of the six members of the Egyptian team that perished on board KLM Flight 607-E - the Hugo de Groot on 14 August 1958.

== Personal life ==
Sabry had two sisters; Laila, who died at the age of 5, and Isis who was married to the Olympic fencer Osman Abdel Hafeez.
