= Daniel Bukantz =

American fencer (1917–2008)

Personal information
- Born: December 4, 1917 New York City, United States
- Died: July 26, 2008 (aged 90) Forest Hills, New York, United States
- Occupation: Dentist
- Height: 6-0.5 ft (185 cm)
- Weight: 194 lb (88 kg)
- Spouse: Alice Ellenbogen Bukantz

Sport
- Sport: Fencing
- Weapon: Foil
- College team: City College of New York
- Club: Fencers Club

Achievements and titles
- National finals: Foil individual champion in 1949, 1952, 1953, and 1957; foil team champion nine times.
Medal record
Representing United States
Maccabiah Games
Gold medal – first place	1950 Tel Aviv	Foil
US National Champion
Gold medal – first place	1949	Foil
Gold medal – first place	1952	Foil
Gold medal – first place	1953	Foil
Gold medal – first place	1957	Foil

Daniel Bukantz (December 4, 1917 – July 26, 2008) was an American four-time individual United States national foil fencing champion, Maccabiah Games individual foil champion, four-time Olympic fencer, fencing referee, and a dentist. He has been inducted into the United States Fencing Hall of Fame, the National Jewish Sports Hall of Fame, and the International Jewish Sports Hall of Fame.

== Early life ==
Bukantz was born in Manhattan in New York City in the United States. He grew up in the Bronx, on the Grand Concourse, and attended the New York children's summer camp Camp Scatico in the 1930s. He was Jewish.

He attended City College of New York ('38). Bukantz then earned a D.D.S. dental degree in 1943 from the New York University College of Dentistry.

Bukantz was a captain in the Army Dental Corps during World War II. He served in the 87th Infantry Division during the Battle of the Bulge in 1944-45.

== Fencing career ==
Bukantz was Captain of the City College Beavers fencing team his senior year, and won the 1938 Intercollegiate Fencing Association individual championship in foil as a senior.

He won the US national Amateur Fencers League of America individual championship in foil four times—in 1949, 1952, 1953, and 1957; since then, only Michael Marx has won as many as four US national foil championships. Bukantz was also part of nine national championship teams for the Fencers Club of New York, in the years 1949-62.

Bukantz competed in foil in the Olympic Games four consecutive times—in 1948 in London at 30 years of age, 1952 in Helsinki, 1956 in Melbourne, and 1960 in Rome. He fenced in team foil in each of the four Olympics, and in individual foil as well in 1952 (reaching the quarter-finals). He placed 4th in team foil at the 1948 and 1956 Olympic Games, and 5th in team foil at the 1960 Olympic Games. The entire USA Foil Fencing Team at the 1956 Olympics was Jewish, with the other Jewish fencers being Al Axelrod, Harold Goldsmith, Nathaniel Lubell, and Byron Krieger; at the time, the only fencing clubs in New York that accepted Jewish members were the Fencers Club and Salle Santelli.

He won the gold medal in foil at the 1950 Maccabiah Games in Israel, defeating teammate Allan Kwartler for the title.

Bukantz also became a fencing official, judging at eight Olympics (from 1952 to 1984, except the U.S.-boycotted 1980 Games) and three World Fencing Championships (1958, 1967, and 1983). In the Olympic Games in 1952, 1956, and 1960 he was both a competitor and a referee. He was a head referee at the 1984 Los Angeles Olympic Games.

== Halls of Fame ==
In 1978 Bukantz was inducted into the United States Fencing Hall of Fame in Shreveport, Louisiana. In 1967 he was inducted into the City College of New York Athletics Hall of Fame. In 1975 he was inducted into the International Jewish Sports Hall of Fame, and in 2008 he was inducted into the National Jewish Sports Hall of Fame. In 2000 he received the Pillar of Achievement Award from the International Jewish Sports Hall of Fame.

== Family and personal life ==
On April 29, 1956, Bukantz married Alice Ellenbogen Bukantz, a Holocaust survivor from Nové Zámky, a town in a part of Hungary that is now Slovakia, who had survived the Auschwitz concentration camp while her parents and 87 other relatives were killed in the Holocaust. They lived in The Meadowbrook building in Forest Hills, Queens, New York, and Sarasota, Florida.

Their son Jeff Bukantz was captain of the 2004 and 2008 United States Olympic fencing teams, has won 13 medals (including three gold medals) at the Maccabiah Games, and is the President of the Maccabi USA organization. Jeff was third alternate on the 1984 and 1988 Olympic Fencing teams, and earned a bronze medal in foil with Team USA in the 1987 Pan American Games. Jeff also wrote a memoir entitled Closing the Distance: Chasing a father’s Olympic Fencing Legacy (Acanthus Publishing, 2006).

Bukantz operated a dental practice in Manhattan, New York, for about 40 years. He provided free dental care to members of the fencing community who could not afford it. Bukantz died in 2008 from lung cancer.

== See also ==
- List of select Jewish fencers
- List of USFA Division I National Champions
- List of USFA Hall of Fame members
