= Lucio Ceccarini =

Italian water polo player

Personal information
- Born: 13 December 1930 Rome, Italy
- Died: 14 July 2009 (aged 78) Rome, Italy

Sport
- Sport: Water polo
Medal record
Representing Italy
Olympic Games
Bronze medal – third place	1952 Helsinki	Team competition

Lucio Ceccarini (13 December 1930 – 14 July 2009) was an Italian water polo player who competed in the 1952 Summer Olympics.

In 1952 he was part of the Italian team which won the bronze medal in the Olympic tournament. He played one match.

== See also ==
- List of Olympic medalists in water polo (men)
