= Enzo Polito =

Italian water polo player (1926–2004)

Personal information
- Born: 29 October 1926 Naples, Italy
- Died: 27 February 2004 (aged 77)

Sport
- Sport: Water polo
Medal record
Representing Italy
Olympic Games
Bronze medal – third place	1952 Helsinki	Team competition

Vincenzo "Enzo" Polito (29 October 1926 – 27 February 2004) was an Italian water polo player who competed in the 1952 Summer Olympics. He died on 27 February 2004, at the age of 77.

== See also ==
- List of Olympic medalists in water polo (men)
