= Carlo Peretti =

Italian water polo player

Personal information
- Born: 5 March 1930 Florence, Italy
- Died: 31 May 2018 (aged 88) Florence, Italy

Sport
- Sport: Water polo
Medal record
Representing Italy
Olympic Games
Bronze medal – third place	1952 Helsinki	Team competition

Carlo Peretti (5 March 1930 – 31 May 2018) was an Italian water polo player who competed in the 1952 Summer Olympics. He was born in Florence. In 1952, he was part of the Italian team which won the bronze medal in the Olympic tournament. He played five matches.

== See also ==
- List of Olympic medalists in water polo (men)
