= Manlio Di Rosa =

Italian fencer (1914–1989)

Personal information
- Born: 11 September 1914 Livorno, Italy
- Died: 15 March 1989 (aged 74) Livorno, Italy

Sport
- Sport: Fencing
Medal record
Men's fencing
Representing Italy
Olympic Games
Gold medal – first place	1936 Berlin	Foil, team
Silver medal – second place	1948 London	Foil, team
Silver medal – second place	1952 Helsinki	Foil, team
Bronze medal – third place	1952 Helsinki	Foil, individual
Gold medal – first place	1956 Melbourne	Foil, team

Manlio Di Rosa (11 September 1914 – 15 March 1989) was an Italian fencer. He won two golds, two silvers and bronze at four different Olympic Games.

== See also ==
- Italy national fencing team - Multiple medallist
