= Gildo Arena =

Italian swimmer and water polo player (1921–2005)

Personal information
- Full name: Ermenegildo Arena
- Nationality: Italy
- Born: 25 February 1921 Naples, Kingdom of Italy
- Died: 8 February 2005 (aged 83) Naples, Italy

Sport
- Sport: Swimming
- Strokes: Freestyle
Medal record
Representing Italy
Olympic Games
Men's Water Polo
Gold medal – first place	1948 London	Team competition
Bronze medal – third place	1952 Helsinki	Team competition

Ermenegildo "Gildo" Arena (25 February 1921 – 8 February 2005) was an Italian water polo player and freestyle swimmer who competed in the 1948 Summer Olympics and in the 1952 Summer Olympics.

In 1948 he was part of the Italian team which won the gold medal. He played six matches and scored eleven goals. Four years later he was a member of the Italian team which won the bronze medal in the Olympic tournament. He played in all eight matches.

== See also ==
- Italy men's Olympic water polo team records and statistics
- List of Olympic champions in men's water polo
- List of Olympic medalists in water polo (men)
