= Osman Abdel Hafeez =

Egyptian fencer (1917–1958)

Personal information
- Born: 30 March 1917 Shibin El Kom, Egypt
- Died: 14 August 1958 (aged 41) Atlantic Ocean

Sport
- Country: Egypt
- Sport: Fencing
Medal record
Mediterranean Games
| Bronze medal – third place | 1951 Alexandria | Épée team |
| Bronze medal – third place | 1951 Alexandria | Foil team |
| Bronze medal – third place | 1955 Barcelona | Foil team |

Osman Abdel Hafeez (30 March 1917 – 14 August 1958) was an Egyptian épée and foil fencer. He competed at the 1948 and 1952 Summer Olympics. He was one of six members of the Egyptian fencing team who perished on board KLM Flight 607-E on 14 August 1958.

== Personal life ==
Hafeez had three brothers, Saleh, Ibrahim, and Fathy, as well as two sisters: Zeinab and Fatma. He was married to Isis Ismail Sabry, the daughter of a pediatrician. She is the sister of Ahmed Sabry his fellow fencing champion who was on the same doomed flight. He had a son, Ismail, and a daughter, Pakinam.

== Medals and honors ==
Hafeez competed at the Mediterranean Games in 1951 where he won bronze medals in the épée and foil team events and in 1955 where he won a bronze medal in the foil team event. The main hall in the Egyptian Fencing Club is named after Hafeez, as well as a street in Nasr City, Cairo, Egypt and a school in his hometown of Shibin El Kom, Egypt.
