= Raffaello Gambino =

Italian water polo player

Personal information
- Born: 18 April 1928 Rome, Italy
- Died: 26 August 1989 (aged 61) Rome, Italy

Sport
- Sport: Water polo
Medal record
Representing Italy
Olympic Games
Bronze medal – third place	1952 Helsinki	Team competition

Raffaello Gambino (18 April 1928 – 26 August 1989) was an Italian water polo player who competed in the 1952 Summer Olympics.

In 1952 he was part of the Italian team which won the bronze medal in the Olympic tournament. He played seven matches as goalkeeper.

== See also ==
- Italy men's Olympic water polo team records and statistics
- List of Olympic medalists in water polo (men)
- List of men's Olympic water polo tournament goalkeepers
