= Leif Klette =

Norwegian fencer (1927–2017)

Personal information
- Born: 21 November 1927 Kvinnherad Municipality, Norway
- Died: 3 April 2017 (aged 89)

Sport
- Sport: Fencing

Leif Klette (21 November 1927 – 3 April 2017) was a Norwegian épée and foil fencer. He competed at the 1952 and 1960 Summer Olympics. He became Norwegian champion twelve times between 1952 and 1970.
