= Renato Traiola =

Italian water polo player

Personal information
- Born: 19 December 1924 Naples, Italy
- Died: 18 January 1988 (aged 63) Naples, Italy

Sport
- Sport: Water polo
Medal record
Representing Italy
Olympic Games
Bronze medal – third place	1952 Helsinki	Team competition

Renato Traiola (19 December 1924 – 18 January 1988) was an Italian water polo player who competed in the 1952 Summer Olympics. He was born in Naples. In 1952 he was part of the Italian team which won the bronze medal in the Olympic tournament. He played one match as goalkeeper.

== See also ==
- Italy men's Olympic water polo team records and statistics
- List of Olympic medalists in water polo (men)
- List of men's Olympic water polo tournament goalkeepers
