= Gertrud Herrbruck =

German swimmer (1926–2021)

Personal information
- Born: July 27, 1926 Pirmasens, West Germany
- Died: June 7, 2021 (aged 94)

Sport
- Sport: Swimming
Medal record
Representing West Germany
European Championships
Silver medal – second place	1950 Vienna	100 m backstroke

Gertrud Herrbruck (27 July 1926 – 7 June 2021) was a German backstroke swimmer who won a silver medal in the 100 m backstroke at the 1950 European Aquatics Championships. She also participated in the 1952 Summer Olympics and finished sixth in the same event. She won several German Championships. She was born in Pirmasens in July 1926 and died in June 2021 at the age of 94.
