= Lars Svantesson =

Swedish swimmer (1933–2023)

Personal information
- National team: Sweden
- Born: 16 February 1933 Borås, Sweden
- Died: 6 November 2023 (aged 90) Borås, Sweden

Sport
- Sport: Swimming

Lars Svantesson (16 February 1933 – 6 November 2023) was a Swedish freestyle swimmer. He competed in two events at the 1952 Summer Olympics in Helsinki, Finland. Svantesson died in Borås on 6 November 2023, at the age of 90.
