= Lajos Maszlay =

Hungarian fencer

Personal information
- Born: 2 October 1903 Budapest, Austria-Hungary
- Died: 1 December 1979 (aged 76) Budapest, Hungary

Sport
- Sport: Fencing
Medal record
Men's fencing
Representing Hungary
Olympic Games
Bronze medal – third place	1948 London	Foil, individual
Bronze medal – third place	1952 Helsinki	Foil, team

Lajos Maszlay (2 October 1903 – 1 December 1979) was a Hungarian fencer. He won a bronze medal at the 1948 Summer Olympics and another at the 1952 Summer Olympics.
