= Endre Palócz =

Hungarian fencer

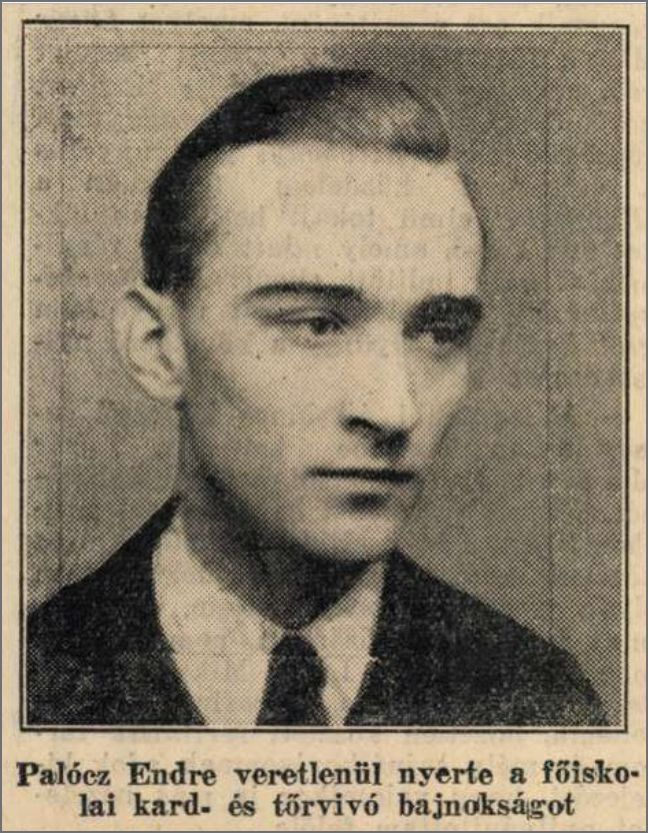
- Endre Palócz in 1936.

Personal information
- Born: 23 March 1911 Budapest, Hungary
- Died: 11 January 1988 (aged 76) Budapest, Hungary

Sport
- Sport: Fencing
Medal record
Men's fencing
Representing Hungary
Olympic Games
Bronze medal – third place	1952 Helsinki	Foil, team

Endre Palócz (23 March 1911 – 11 January 1988) was a Hungarian fencer. He won a bronze medal in the team foil event at the 1952 Summer Olympics.
