= Geminio Ognio =

Italian water polo player (1917–1990)

Personal information
- Born: 13 December 1917 Recco, Italy
- Died: 28 October 1990 (aged 72) Rome, Italy
Medal record
Representing Italy
Olympic Games
Gold medal – first place	1948 London	Team competition
Bronze medal – third place	1952 Helsinki	Team competition

Geminio Ognio (13 December 1917 – 28 October 1990) was an Italian water polo player who competed in the 1948 Summer Olympics and in the 1952 Summer Olympics.

He was born in Recco and died in Rome.

In 1948 he was part of the Italian team which won the gold medal. He played six matches and scored four goals.

Four years later he was a member of the Italian team which won the bronze medal in the Olympic tournament. He played four matches.

== See also ==
- Italy men's Olympic water polo team records and statistics
- List of Olympic champions in men's water polo
- List of Olympic medalists in water polo (men)
