= Endre Tilli =

Hungarian fencer (1922–1958)

Personal information
- Born: 15 August 1922 Budapest, Hungary
- Died: 14 August 1958 (aged 35) Shannon, County Clare, Ireland

Sport
- Sport: Fencing
Medal record
Men's fencing
Representing Hungary
Olympic Games
Bronze medal – third place	1952 Helsinki	Foil, team
Bronze medal – third place	1956 Melbourne	Foil, team

Endre Tilli (15 August 1922 – 14 August 1958) was a Hungarian fencer. He won a bronze medal in the team foil events at the 1952 and 1956 Summer Olympics. He died aboard KLM Flight 607-E in 1958.
