= Jacques Lataste =

French fencer (1922–2011)

Personal information
- Born: 7 June 1922 La Grand-Combe, France
- Died: 10 November 2011 (aged 89)

Sport
- Sport: Fencing
Medal record
Men's fencing
Representing France
Olympic Games
Gold medal – first place	1948 London	Foil, team
Gold medal – first place	1952 Helsinki	Foil, team
Silver medal – second place	1956 Melbourne	Foil, team

Jacques Lataste (7 June 1922 – 10 November 2011) was a French fencer. He won two gold medals and a silver in the team foil event at three different Olympics.

== Olympic success ==
- Gold medal in the team foil at Summer Olympics in 1948 alongside Adrien Rommel, Andre Bonnin, Christian d'Oriola, Jehan Buhan and Rene Bougnol.
- Gold medal in the team foil at Summer Olympics in 1952 alongside Adrien Rommel, Christian d'Oriola, Claude Nette, Jacques Christmas and Jehan Buhan.
- Silver medal in the team foil to Summer Olympics of 1956.
