= Maurizio Mannelli =

Italian water polo player

Personal information
- Born: 1 January 1930 Rome, Italy
- Died: 22 May 2014 (aged 84)

Sport
- Sport: Water polo
Medal record
Representing Italy
Olympic Games
| Bronze medal – third place | 1952 Helsinki | Team competition |

Maurizio Mannelli (1 January 1930 – 22 May 2014) was an Italian water polo player who competed in the 1952 Summer Olympics.

In 1952 he was part of the Italian team which won the bronze medal in the Olympic tournament. He played all eight matches.

== See also ==
- List of Olympic medalists in water polo (men)
