= Renato De Sanzuane =

Italian water polo player

Personal information
- Born: 5 March 1925 Venice, Italy
- Died: 23 June 1986 (aged 61) Mestre, Italy

Sport
- Sport: Water polo
Medal record
Representing Italy
Olympic Games
Bronze medal – third place	1952 Helsinki	Team competition

Renato De Sanzuane (5 March 1925 – 23 June 1986) was an Italian water polo player who competed in the 1952 Summer Olympics.

In 1952 he was part of the Italian team which won the bronze medal in the Olympic tournament. He played seven matches.

== See also ==
- List of Olympic medalists in water polo (men)
