= Margareta Westeson =

Swedish swimmer

Personal information
- Born: 31 January 1936 (age 90) Malmö, Sweden

Sport
- Sport: Swimming

Margareta Westeson (born 31 January 1936) is a Swedish former swimmer. She competed in the women's 400 metre freestyle at the 1952 Summer Olympics.
