= Salvatore Gionta =

Italian water polo player (1930–2025)

- Gionta c.1952

Personal information
- Nationality: Italian
- Born: 22 December 1930 Formia, Italy
- Died: 28 July 2025 (aged 94) Rome, Italy

Sport
- Sport: Water polo
Medal record
Representing Italy
Olympic Games
Gold medal – first place	1960 Rome	Team competition
Bronze medal – third place	1952 Helsinki	Team competition

Salvatore Gionta (22 December 1930 – 28 July 2025) was an Italian water polo player who competed in the 1952 Summer Olympics and in the 1960 Summer Olympics.

== Biography ==
Salvatore Gionta was born in Formia. In 1952 he was part of the Italian team which won the bronze medal in the Olympic tournament. He played two matches. Eight years later he won the gold medal with the Italian team in the 1960 Olympic tournament. He played two matches and scored two goals.

Salvatore Gionta died on 28 July 2025, at the age of 94.

== See also ==
- Italy men's Olympic water polo team records and statistics
- List of Olympic champions in men's water polo
- List of Olympic medalists in water polo (men)
