= Mohamed Ali Riad =

Egyptian fencer

Personal information
- Born: 13 May 1927
- Died: 14 August 1958 (aged 31) KLM Flight 607-E - Hugo de Groot plane crash

Sport
- Sport: Fencing
Medal record
Mediterranean Games
Bronze medal – third place	1955 Barcelona	Team foil

Mohamed Ali Riad (13 May 1927 – 14 August 1958) was an Egyptian fencer. He competed in the individual and team foil events 1952 Summer Olympics. He also competed at the 1955 Mediterranean Games where he won a bronze medal in team foil event. He was one of six members of the Egyptian fencing team who perished on board KLM Flight 607-E on 14 August 1958.
