= Andrei Vîlcea =

Romanian fencer

Personal information
- Born: 2 July 1922 Sălcuţa, Romania
- Died: 1998

Sport
- Sport: Fencing

Andrei Vîlcea (2 July 1922 – 1998) was a Romanian foil and sabre fencer. He competed in three events at the 1952 Summer Olympics.
