= Kurt Wahl =

Personal information
- Born: 5 May 1912
- Died: 27 December 1990 (aged 78)

Sport
- Sport: Fencing

Kurt Wahl (5 May 1912 – 27 December 1990) was a German fencer. He competed in the individual and team foil events at the 1952 Summer Olympics. Between 1955 and 1976, he was also the president of the Bavarian Fencing Federation.
