= Giorgio Sobrero =

Italian sprinter

Personal information
- Nationality: Italian
- Born: 12 July 1930 Turin, Italy
- Died: 10 September 2017 (aged 87) Turin, Italy

Sport
- Sport: Sprinting
- Event: 200 metres

Giorgio Sobrero (12 July 1930 – 10 September 2017) was an Italian sprinter. He competed in the men's 200 metres at the 1952 Summer Olympics.
