= Luke Wendon =

British fencer (1926–2016)

Personal information
- Full name: Ulrich Luke Wendon
- Born: 17 April 1926 Germany
- Died: 6 December 2016 (aged 90)

Sport
- Sport: Fencing

Ulrich Luke Wendon (17 April 1926 – 6 December 2016) was a German born, British fencer. He competed at the 1948 and 1952 Summer Olympics. In 1952, he won the foil title at the British Fencing Championships.
