= Jerzy Twardokens =

Polish fencer

Personal information
- Born: 11 December 1931 Poznań, Poland
- Died: 26 July 2015 (aged 83)

Sport
- Sport: Fencing

Jerzy Twardokens (11 December 1931 – 26 July 2015) was a Polish fencer. He competed in the individual foil and team sabre events at the 1952 Summer Olympics.

After the World Fencing Championship in Philadelphia in 1958, Twardokens decided to stay in the United States. He later worked at the University of Nevada at Reno, where he was a professor who taught kinesiology. His daughter Eva Twardokens represented the United States in alpine skiing at two Olympic Games.
