= Norman Casmir =

German fencer (1930–1998)

Personal information
- Born: 16 October 1930 Frankfurt am Main, Germany
- Died: 15 February 1998 (aged 67) Blindenmarkt, Germany

Sport
- Sport: Fencing

Norman Casmir (16 October 1930 – 15 February 1998) was a German fencer. He competed in the individual and team foil events at the 1952 Summer Olympics. Casmir died in Blindenmarkt on 15 February 1998, at the age of 67.
