= Nicolae Marinescu =

Romanian fencer

Personal information
- Born: 15 December 1906 Bucharest, Romania
- Died: 1977 (aged 70–71)

Sport
- Sport: Fencing

Nicolae Marinescu (15 December 1906 – 1977) was a Romanian fencer. He competed at the 1936 and 1952 Summer Olympics.
