= German Bokun =

Belarusian fencer

Personal information
- Born: 27 August 1922 Minsk Region, Byelorussian SSR
- Died: 8 March 1978 (aged 55)

Sport
- Sport: Fencing

German Bokun (Russian: Герман Матвеевич Бокун; 27 August 1922 – 8 March 1978) was a Belarusian-Soviet fencer. He competed in the individual and team foil events at the 1952 Summer Olympics.
