= Helsinki Swimming Stadium =

Outdoor swimming pool in Helsinki, Finland

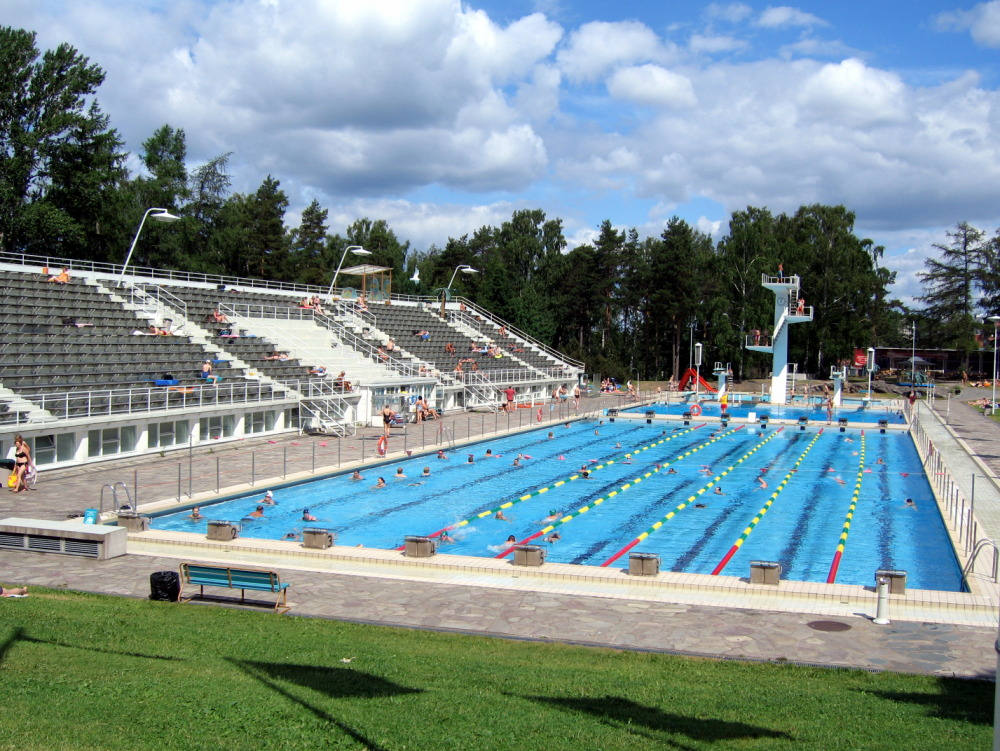
- The Swimming Stadium in the summer 2006.
- Interactive map of Helsinki Swimming Stadium
- Coordinates: 60°11′19.8″N 24°55′51.4″E

Helsinki Swimming Stadium is an outdoor swimming venue in Helsinki, Finland, located in the Eläintarha area to the northeast of the Helsinki Olympic Stadium.

== History ==
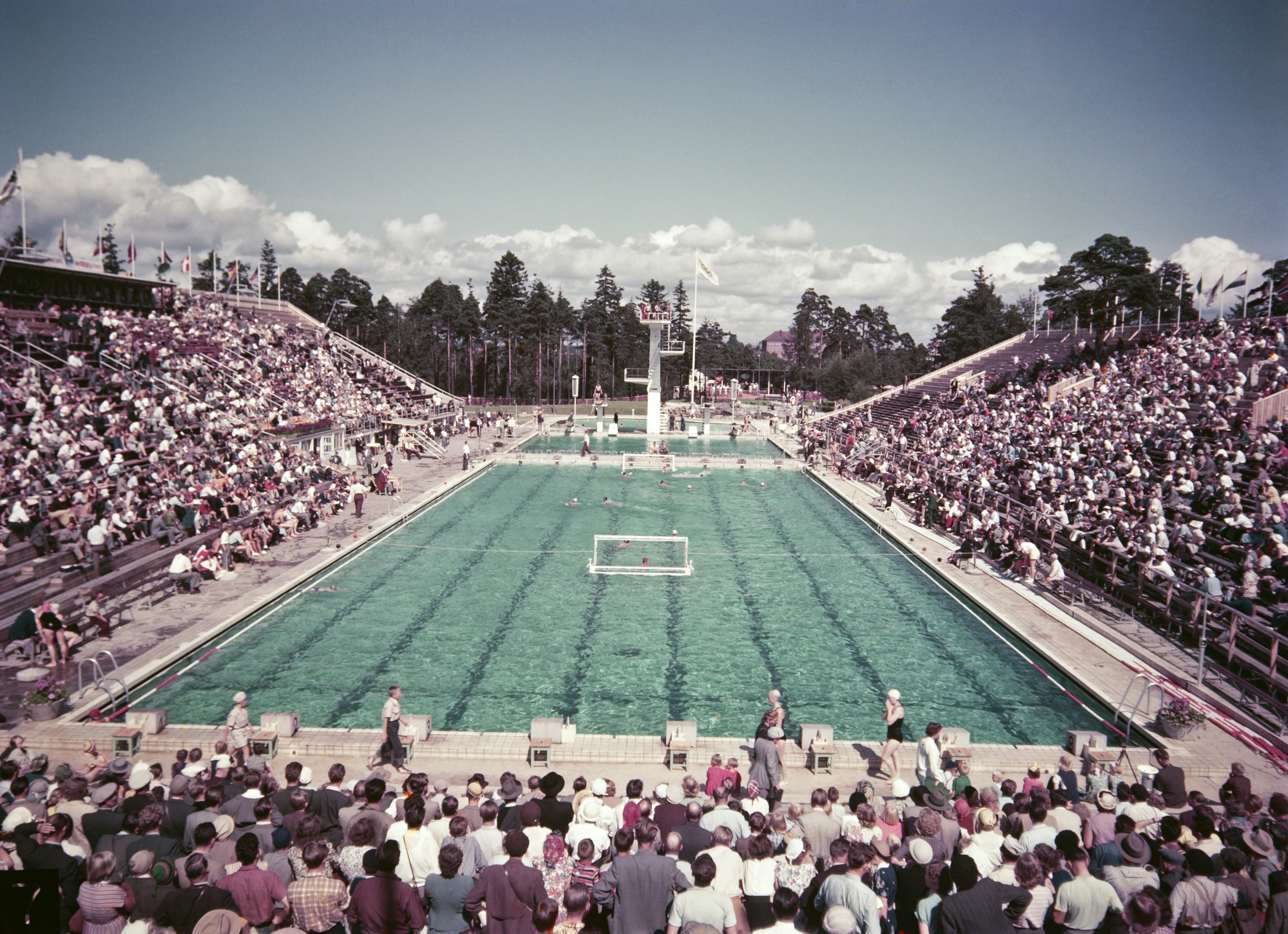
Water polo during the 1952 Summer Olympics

The Swimming Stadium was designed by architect Jorma Järvi in the Functionalist style, which was prevalent during the 1930s. The stadium was built for the 1940 Olympic Games which were cancelled due to World War II, but it later hosted the 1952 Summer Olympics.

Construction was delayed due to the war, but was completed in 1947. During wartime, the already finished pools were used to store herring and root vegetables.

According to the International Swimming Federation, the water temperature in the pool needed to be at least 22 °C, nowadays 27 °C. The machinery to heat the outdoor pool was ordered from abroad, and the ship transporting them was sunk immediately after the war broke out.

The stadium has been listed as a significant example of modern architecture in Finland by Docomomo.

== Current use ==
The Swimming Stadium is a popular recreational venue for citizens. It is open from the beginning of May until the end of September. During summertime, it is visited by about 5,000 swimmers every day – 290,000 altogether during the summer of 2013. The stadium has three pools: a 50-metre exercise swimming pool, a diving pool and a wading pool for children. The diving pool has two 1 metre and two 3 metre springboards, and a 1-metre plateau in front of the diving tower. Use of the diving tower is controlled and requires lifeguard supervision. The 1 and 3 metre springboards are almost always freely usable by customers. However, when swimming teams or clubs come to practice at the Stadium, the 3 metre springboard may be reserved for their use.

The area also has a water slide, a gym, a basketball court, a volleyball field, a table tennis table and a café. The gym is open year-round.

Outside normal opening times, the Stadium is used as a practicing place for other aquatic sports and diving schools use the diving pool as practice pool.

The Swimming Stadium was also the scene for filming the popular Finnish youth television show Summeri during the years 2003–2009 and 2011.

In January 2009, the city of Helsinki initiated a discussion of keeping the Helsinki Swimming Stadium heated throughout the entire autumn and winter, in order to make it accessible for outdoor swimming during the entire year, in honour of the 90th anniversary of the Sports Bureau of Helsinki. However, this idea was abandoned as too expensive.

== Gallery ==
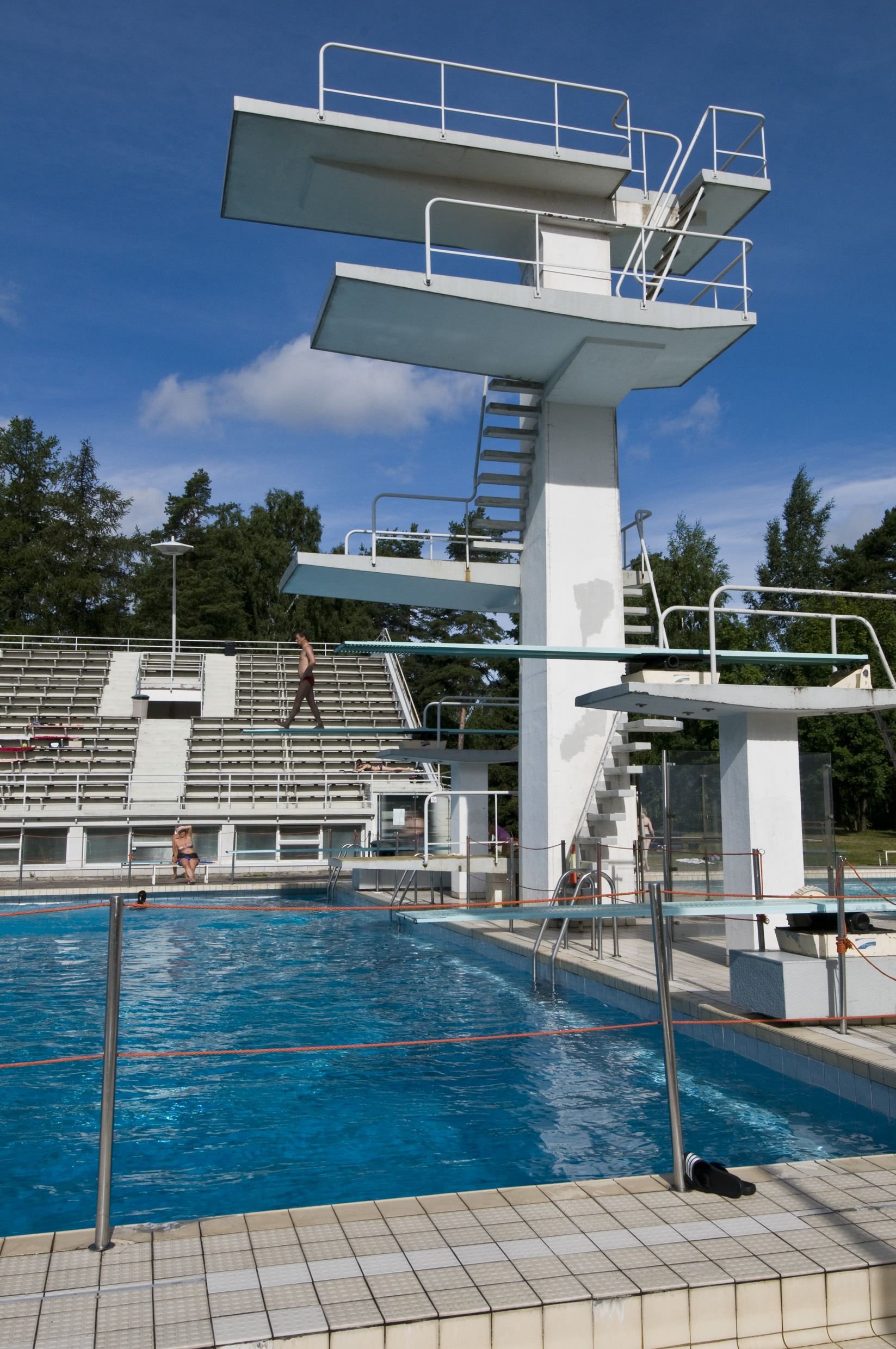
The diving tower

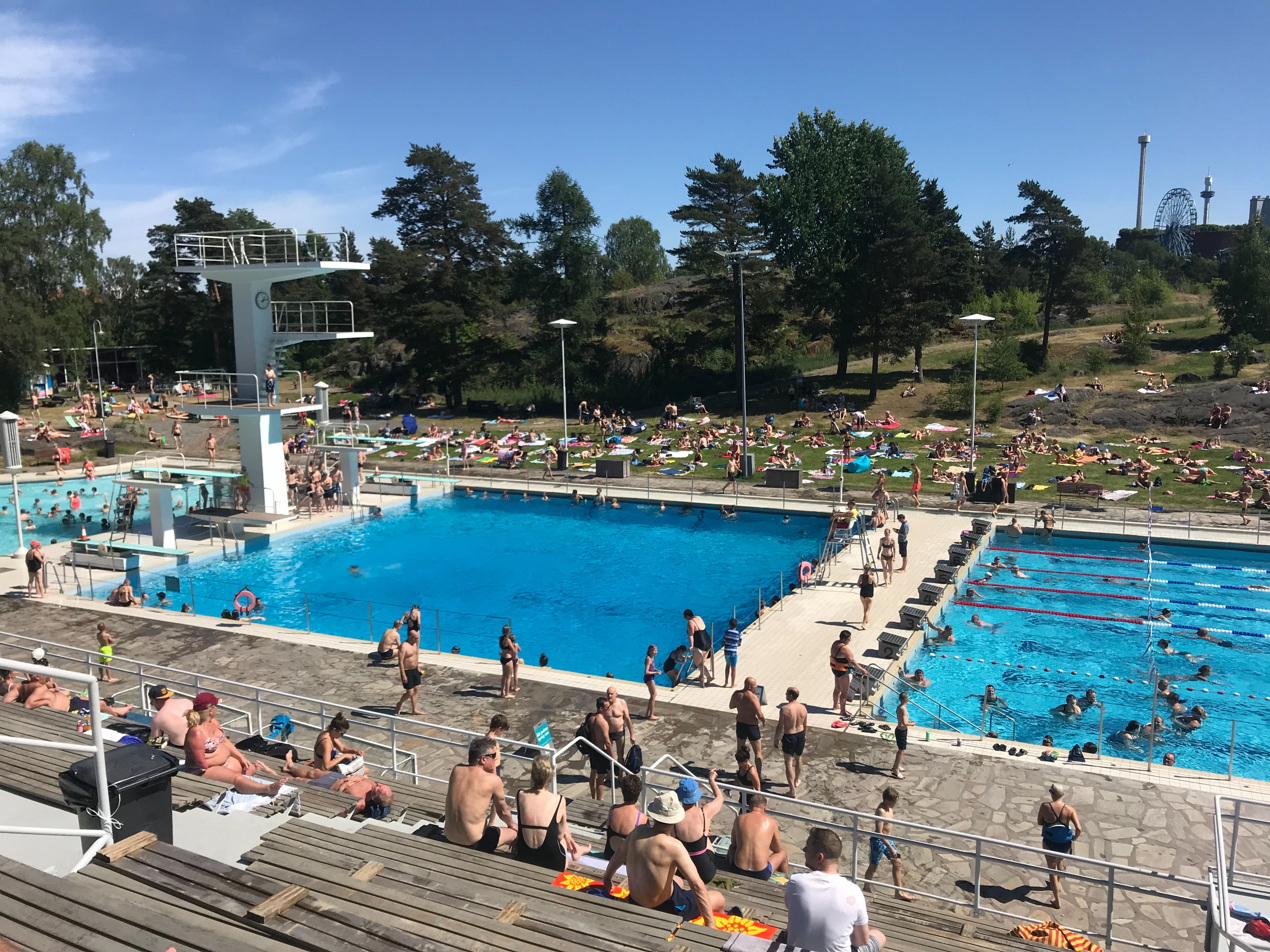
The diving pool

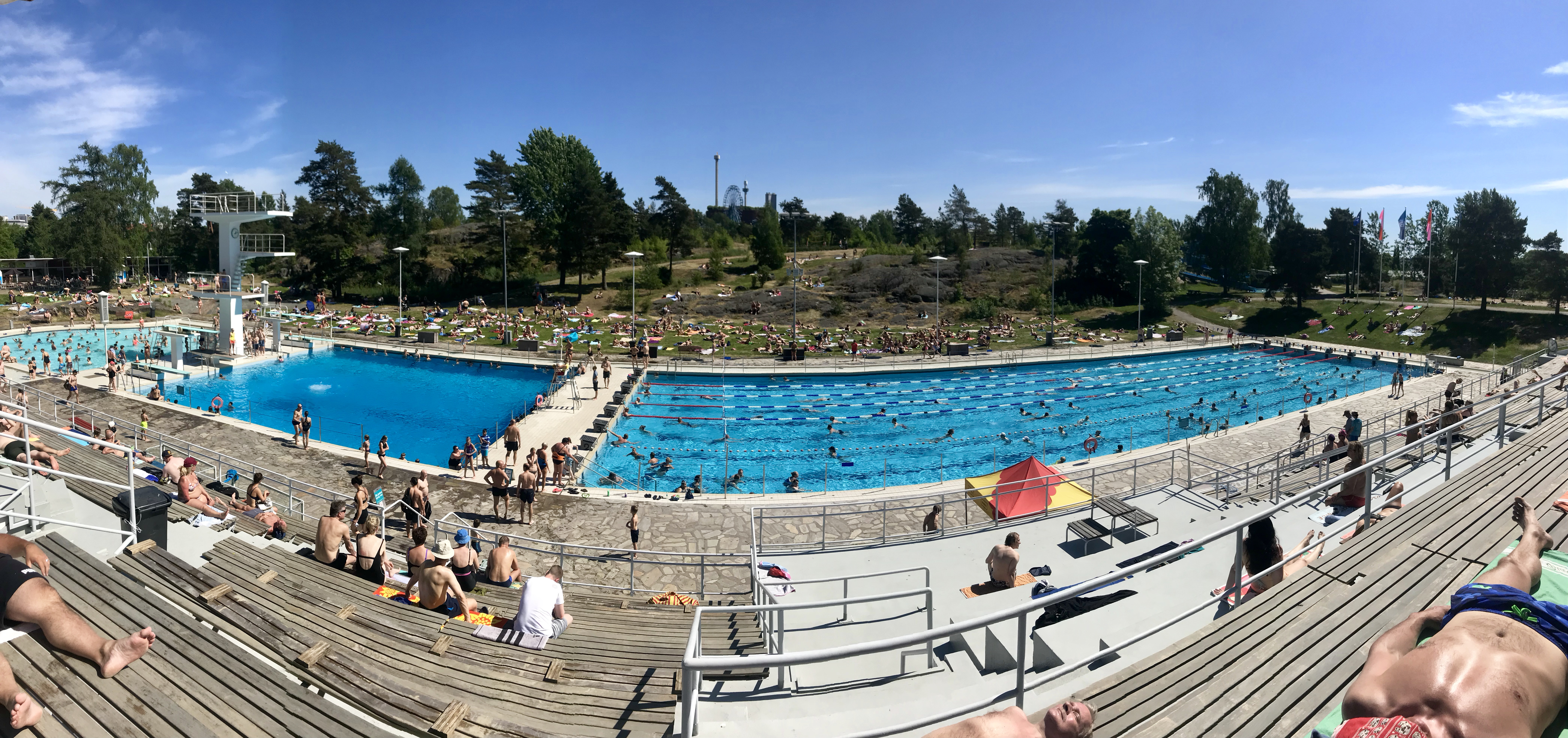
Panorama of the swimming stadium

== See also ==
- Kumpula Outdoor Swimming Pool
