= Yulen Uralov =

Russian fencer (1924–2026)

Personal information
- Full name: Yulen Isaakovych Uralov
- Born: Юлен Исаакович Уралов; 23 November 1924 Kyiv, Ukrainian SSR, Soviet Union
- Died: 9 June 2026 (aged 101) Ashkelon, Israel

Sport
- Country: Soviet Union
- Sport: Fencing
- Event: Foil
- Club: SKA

Yulen Isaakovych Uralov (also Julen Uralov; Ukrainian: Юлен Ісаакович Уралов; 23 November 1924 – 9 June 2026) was a Soviet Olympic fencer.

== Biography ==
Uralov was born in Kyiv, Ukrainian SSR. He graduated from the Military Institute of Physical Culture.

His club was SKA Leningrad. He was named a Honoured Master of Sport of the USSR in 1949. He was the USSR foil champion in 1952 and 1953, a silver medal winner in 1955, and a bronze medal winner in 1949.

He competed in the individual and team foil events at the 1952 Summer Olympics in Helsinki, Finland, at the age of 27.

After his competitive career concluded, Uralov coached the Ukrainian national team. He lived in Israel since the early 1990s.

Uralov turned 100 on 23 November 2024, and died in Israel on 9 June 2026, at the age of 101.

== See also ==
- List of select Jewish fencers
