= Giancarlo Bergamini =

Italian fencer (1926–2020)

Personal information
- Born: 2 August 1926 Milan, Italy
- Died: 4 February 2020 (aged 93) Lanzo d'Intelvi, Italy

Sport
- Sport: Fencing
Medal record
Men's fencing
Representing Italy
Olympic Games
| Silver medal – second place | 1952 Helsinki | Foil, team |
| Silver medal – second place | 1956 Melbourne | Foil, individual |
| Gold medal – first place | 1956 Melbourne | Foil, team |

Giancarlo Bergamini (2 August 1926 – 4 February 2020) was an Italian fencer. He won one gold and two silver medals at two Olympic Games. Bergamini died in February 2020 at the age of 93.
