= Nils Rydström =

Swedish fencer (1921–2018)

Personal information
- Nationality: Swedish
- Born: 15 September 1921 Stockholm, Sweden
- Died: 20 September 2018 (aged 97) Stockholm, Sweden

Sport
- Sport: Fencing

Nils Rydström (15 September 1921 – 20 September 2018) was a Swedish foil fencer. He competed at the 1948 and 1952 Summer Olympics.
