= Rolf Magnusson =

Swedish fencer (1921–2019)

Personal information
- Born: 29 December 1921 Stockholm, Sweden
- Died: 19 June 2019 (aged 97)

Sport
- Sport: Fencing

Rolf Magnusson (29 December 1921 – 16 June 2019) was a Swedish fencer. He competed in the individual and team foil events at the 1952 Summer Olympics.
