= Bo Eriksson =

Swedish fencer

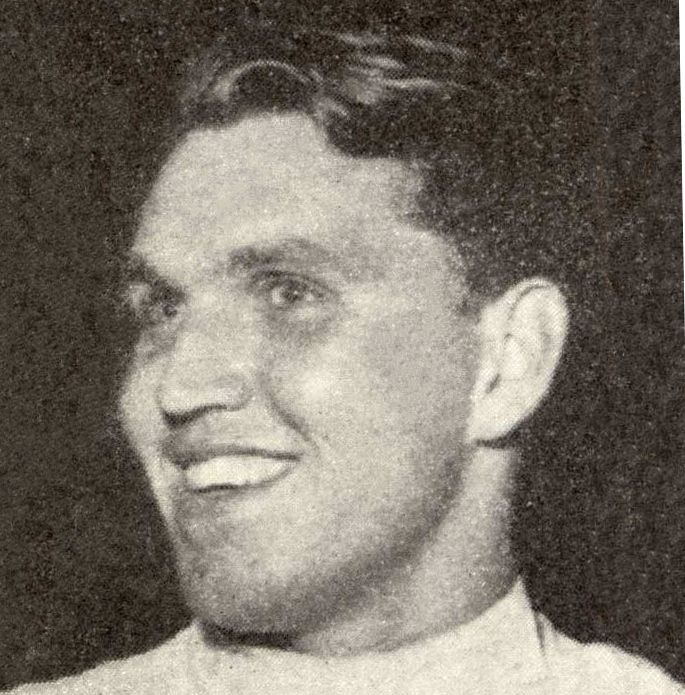

Personal information
- Born: 30 March 1922 Uppsala, Sweden
- Died: 15 December 1982 (aged 60) Täby, Sweden

Sport
- Sport: Fencing
- Events: Foil, sabre
- Club: A7 IF, Visby; Stockholms AF

Bo Eriksson (30 March 1922 – 15 December 1982) was a Swedish fencer. He competed at the 1948 and 1952 Summer Olympics in five sabre and foil events in total, but never reached a final. He was the Swedish flag bearer at the 1952 Games.
