= Fencing at the 1948 Summer Olympics – Men's foil =

Olympic fencing tournament

Men's foil at the Games of the XIV Olympiad
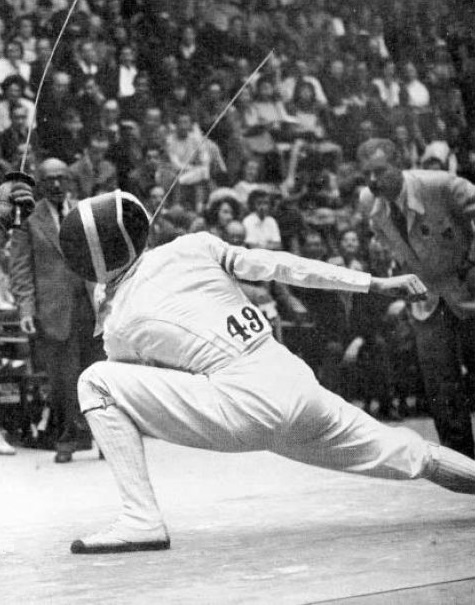
- Christian d'Oriola
- Venue: Wembley Palace of Engineering, London
- Dates: 3–4 August 1948
- Competitors: 63 from 25 nations

Medalists
1st place, gold medalist(s)		Jehan Buhan	France
2nd place, silver medalist(s)		Christian d'Oriola	France
3rd place, bronze medalist(s)		Lajos Maszlay	Hungary

The men's foil was one of seven fencing events on the fencing at the 1948 Summer Olympics programme. It was the tenth appearance of the event. The competition was held from 3 August 1948 to 4 August 1948. 63 fencers from 25 nations competed. The event was won by Jehan Buhan of France, the nation's first victory in the men's foil since 1928 and fifth overall (passing Italy for most all-time). His countryman Christian d'Oriola took silver, while Lajos Maszlay earned Hungary's first medal in the men's individual foil with his bronze.

== Background ==
This was the 10th appearance of the event, which has been held at every Summer Olympics except 1908 (when there was a foil display only rather than a medal event). None of the pre-World War II 1936 finalists returned. The favorite was young Christian d'Oriola, the 1947 world champion. Joining him on the French team was 1947 épée world champion Jehan Buhan, who would have been favored in 1940 were it not for the war.

Colombia, Ireland, Luxembourg, and Turkey each made their debut in the men's foil. The United States made its ninth appearance, most of any nation, having missed only the inaugural 1896 competition.

== Competition format ==
The event used a four-round format. In each round, the fencers were divided into pools to play a round-robin within the pool. Bouts were to five touches. Not all bouts were played in some pools if not necessary to determine advancement. Ties were broken through fence-off bouts ("barrages") in early rounds if necessary for determining advancement, but by touches received in final rounds (and for non-advancement-necessary placing in earlier rounds). Standard foil rules were used, including that touches had to be made with the tip of the foil, the target area was limited to the torso, and priority determined the winner of double touches.

- Round 1: There were 8 pools of 7–9 fencers each. The top 4 fencers in each pool advanced to the quarterfinals.
- Quarterfinals: There were 4 pools of 8 fencers each. The top 4 fencers in each quarterfinal advanced to the semifinals.
- Semifinals: There were 2 pools of 8 fencers each. The top 4 fencers in each semifinal advanced to the final.
- Final: The final pool had 8 fencers.

== Schedule ==
All times are British Summer Time (UTC+1)

Date	Time	Round
Tuesday, 3 August 1948		Round 1
Wednesday, 4 August 1948		Quarterfinals; Semifinals; Final

== Results ==
=== Round 1 ===
The top 4 finishers in each pool advanced to round 2.

==== Pool 1 ====
Hörning defeated Gretsch in a barrage for fourth place.

Rank	Fencer	Nation	Wins	Losses	Notes
1	Manlio Di Rosa	Italy	6	1	Q
2	Fulvio Galimi	Argentina	6	1	Q
3	Aage Leidersdorff	Denmark	6	2	Q
4	Walo Hörning	Switzerland	5	3	Q
5	Émile Gretsch	Luxembourg	5	3	
6	Lucilo de la Peña	Cuba	3	4	
7	Hugo Higueras	Peru	2	5	
8	Salvatore Scianamea	Brazil	0	7	
8	Tom Smith	Ireland	0	7	

==== Pool 2 ====
Younes and Rydström defeated Barrientos in a three-way barrage for third and fourth place.

Rank	Fencer	Nation	Wins	Losses	Notes
1	Giuliano Nostini	Italy	7	0	Q
2	André Van De Werve De Vorsselaer	Belgium	5	1	Q
3	Mahmoud Younes	Egypt	4	3	Q
4	Nils Rydström	Sweden	4	3	Q
5	Armando Barrientos	Cuba	4	3	
6	Ioannis Karamazakis	Greece	2	5	
7	Jaime Ucar	Uruguay	1	5	
8	Georges Pouliot	Canada	0	7	

==== Pool 3 ====
Palócz defeated Albrechtsen in a barrage for fourth place.

Rank	Fencer	Nation	Wins	Losses	Notes
1	Emrys Lloyd	Great Britain	5	1	Q
2	Henri Paternóster	Belgium	4	2	Q
3	Renzo Nostini	Italy	4	2	Q
4	Endre Palócz	Hungary	3	3	Q
5	Ole Albrechtsen	Denmark	3	3	
6	Heikki Raitio	Finland	2	4	
7	Enrique Accorsi	Chile	0	6	

==== Pool 4 ====
Rank	Fencer	Nation	Wins	Losses	Notes
1	Christian d'Oriola	France	7	0	Q
2	Lajos Maszlay	Hungary	5	2	Q
3	Lodovico Alessandri	Brazil	5	2	Q
4	Henny ter Weer	Netherlands	4	3	Q
5	Léon Buck	Luxembourg	3	4	
6	Konstantinos Bembis	Greece	3	4	
7	Nick Thuillier	Ireland	1	6	
8	Roland Asselin	Canada	0	7	

==== Pool 5 ====
Rank	Fencer	Nation	Wins	Losses	Notes
1	Jéhan Buhan	France	6	0	Q
2	Bo Eriksson	Sweden	5	2	Q
3	Daniel Rossi	Uruguay	5	2	Q
4	Hassan Hosni Tawfik	Egypt	4	3	Q
5	Nate Lubell	United States	3	4	
6	Johannes Zoet	Netherlands	2	5	
7	Jorge Agostini	Cuba	2	4	
8	Owen Tuohy	Ireland	0	7	

==== Pool 6 ====
Rank	Fencer	Nation	Wins	Losses	Notes
1	Dean Cetrulo	United States	7	0	Q
2	René Bougnol	France	6	1	Q
3	Manuel Torrente	Argentina	5	2	Q
4	Arthur Smith	Great Britain	4	3	Q
5	Kauko Jalkanen	Finland	2	5	
6	Roberto Camargo	Colombia	2	5	
7	Jean Rubli	Switzerland	1	5	
7	Eddy Kuijpers	Netherlands	1	6	

==== Pool 7 ====
Abdel Hafeez defeated Lamesch in a barrage for fourth place.

Rank	Fencer	Nation	Wins	Losses	Notes
1	René Paul	Great Britain	5	1	Q
2	Félix Galimi	Argentina	5	1	Q
3	Silvio Giolito	United States	4	2	Q
4	Osman Abdel Hafeez	Egypt	3	3	Q
5	Gust Lamesch	Luxembourg	3	3	
6	Nihat Balkan	Turkey	0	5	
6	Alfredo Grisi	Mexico	0	5	

==== Pool 8 ====
Schlaepfer defeated Hátszeghy in a barrage for fourth place.

Rank	Fencer	Nation	Wins	Losses	Notes
1	Sergio Iesi	Uruguay	6	1	Q
2	Paul Valcke	Belgium	6	1	Q
3	Ivan Ruben	Denmark	5	2	Q
4	Corrado Schlaepfer	Switzerland	4	3	Q
5	József Hátszeghy	Hungary	4	3	
6	Stefanos Zintzos	Greece	2	5	
7	Alf Horn	Canada	1	6	
8	Nejat Tulgar	Turkey	0	7	

=== Quarterfinals ===
The top 4 finishers in each pool advanced to the semifinals.

==== Quarterfinal 1 ====
Rank	Fencer	Nation	Wins	Losses	Notes
1	Giuliano Nostini	Italy	6	0	Q
2	René Bougnol	France	5	1	Q
3	Ivan Ruben	Denmark	4	3	Q
4	Dean Cetrulo	United States	4	3	Q
5	André Van De Werve De Vorsselaer	Belgium	3	4	
6	Hassan Hosni Tawfik	Egypt	2	5	
7	Endre Palócz	Hungary	1	5	
8	Daniel Rossi	Uruguay	1	5	

==== Quarterfinal 2 ====
Rank	Fencer	Nation	Wins	Losses	Notes
1	Manlio Di Rosa	Italy	6	0	Q
2	Jéhan Buhan	France	5	1	Q
3	Silvio Giolito	United States	4	2	Q
4	Bo Eriksson	Sweden	4	2	Q
5	Aage Leidersdorff	Denmark	2	4	
6	Arthur Smith	Great Britain	2	4	
7	Fulvio Galimi	Argentina	1	5	
8	Walo Hörning	Switzerland	0	6	

==== Quarterfinal 3 ====
Rank	Fencer	Nation	Wins	Losses	Notes
1	Christian d'Oriola	France	6	1	Q
1	Félix Galimi	Argentina	6	1	Q
3	Henri Paternóster	Belgium	4	3	Q
4	Osman Abdel Hafeez	Egypt	4	2	Q
5	René Paul	Great Britain	3	4	
6	Henny ter Weer	Netherlands	2	4	
7	Corrado Schlaepfer	Switzerland	1	5	
8	Lodovico Alessandri	Brazil	0	6	

==== Quarterfinal 4 ====
Rank	Fencer	Nation	Wins	Losses	Notes
1	Renzo Nostini	Italy	5	1	Q
2	Emrys Lloyd	Great Britain	5	1	Q
3	Lajos Maszlay	Hungary	5	1	Q
4	Paul Valcke	Belgium	5	2	Q
5	Sergio Iesi	Uruguay	3	4	
6	Manuel Torrente	Argentina	1	5	
7	Mahmoud Younes	Egypt	1	5	
8	Nils Rydström	Sweden	0	6	

=== Semifinals ===
The top 4 finishers in each pool advanced to the final.

==== Semifinal 1 ====
Rank	Fencer	Nation	Wins	Losses	Notes
1	Jéhan Buhan	France	6	0	Q
2	Christian d'Oriola	France	5	1	Q
3	Ivan Ruben	Denmark	4	2	Q
4	Emrys Lloyd	Great Britain	4	2	Q
5	Renzo Nostini	Italy	2	4	
6	Henri Paternóster	Belgium	1	5	
7	Osman Abdel Hafeez	Egypt	1	5	
8	Silvio Giolito	United States	1	5	

==== Semifinal 2 ====
Di Rosa defeated Cetrulo in a barrage for fourth place.

Rank	Fencer	Nation	Wins	Losses	Notes
1	Lajos Maszlay	Hungary	5	1	Q
1	René Bougnol	France	5	2	Q
1	Paul Valcke	Belgium	5	2	Q
4	Manlio Di Rosa	Italy	4	3	Q
5	Dean Cetrulo	United States	4	3	
6	Giuliano Nostini	Italy	2	4	
7	Félix Galimi	Argentina	1	5	
8	Bo Eriksson	Sweden	0	6	

=== Final ===
Rank	Fencer	Nation	Wins	Losses	TS	TR
1st place, gold medalist(s)	Jéhan Buhan	France	7	0	35	14
2nd place, silver medalist(s)	Christian d'Oriola	France	5	2	29	18
3rd place, bronze medalist(s)	Lajos Maszlay	Hungary	4	3	25	22
4	Emrys Lloyd	Great Britain	4	3	23	29
5	René Bougnol	France	3	4	28	26
6	Manlio Di Rosa	Italy	3	4	22	27
7	Paul Valcke	Belgium	1	6	21	27
8	Ivan Ruben	Denmark	1	6	15	33
