= Fencing at the 1948 Summer Olympics – Men's team foil =

Men's team foil at the Games of the XIV Olympiad
- Venue: Wembley Palace of Engineering, London
- Dates: 30 – 31 July 1948
- Competitors: 82 from 16 nations

Medalists
1st place, gold medalist(s)		André Bonin; Jéhan Buhan; Jacques Lataste; René Bougnol; Christian d'Oriola; Adrien Rommel	France
2nd place, silver medalist(s)		Edoardo Mangiarotti; Manlio Di Rosa; Renzo Nostini; Giuliano Nostini; Giorgio Pellini; Saverio Ragno	Italy
3rd place, bronze medalist(s)		Georges de Bourguignon; Henri Paternóster; Édouard Yves; Raymond Bru; André Van De Werve De Vorsselaer; Paul Valcke	Belgium

The men's team foil was one of seven fencing events on the fencing at the 1948 Summer Olympics programme. It was the seventh appearance of the event. The competition was held from 30 July 1948 to 31 July 1948. 82 fencers from 16 nations competed.

The competition format continued the pool play round-robin from prior years. Each of the four fencers from one team would face each of the four from the other, for a total of 16 bouts per match. The team that won more bouts won the match, with competition potentially stopping when one team reached 9 points out of the possible 16 (this did not always occur and matches sometimes continued). If the bouts were 8–8, touches received was used to determine the winning team. Pool matches unnecessary to the result were not played.

== Rosters ==
Argentina

- José Rodríguez
- Fulvio Galimi
- Manuel Torrente
- Félix Galimi

Belgium

- Georges de Bourguignon
- Henri Paternóster
- Édouard Yves
- Raymond Bru
- André Van De Werve De Vorsselaer
- Paul Valcke

Canada

- Robert Desjarlais
- Georges Pouliot
- Alf Horn
- Roland Asselin

Denmark

- Ivan Ruben
- Ole Albrechtsen
- Aage Leidersdorff
- Tage Jørgensen
- Ivan Osiier
- Flemming Vögg

Egypt

- Osman Abdel Hafeez
- Salah Dessouki
- Mahmoud Younes
- Mohamed Zulficar
- Hassan Hosni Tawfik
- Mahmoud Abdin

Finland

- Kauko Jalkanen
- Nils Sjöblom
- Erkki Kerttula
- Heikki Raitio

France

- André Bonin
- Jéhan Buhan
- Jacques Lataste
- René Bougnol
- Christian d'Oriola
- Adrien Rommel

Great Britain

- René Paul
- Arthur Smith
- Harold Cooke
- Emrys Lloyd
- Pierre Turquet
- Luke Wendon

Greece

- Athanasios Nanopoulos
- Stefanos Zintzos
- Ioannis Karamazakis
- Konstantinos Bembis

Hungary

- Béla Bay
- Aladár Gerevich
- József Hátszeghy
- Lajos Maszlay
- Pál Dunay
- Endre Palócz

Ireland

- Owen Tuohy
- Patrick Duffy
- Tom Smith
- Nick Thuillier

Italy

- Edoardo Mangiarotti
- Manlio Di Rosa
- Renzo Nostini
- Giuliano Nostini
- Giorgio Pellini
- Saverio Ragno

Netherlands

- Willem van den Berg
- Henny ter Weer
- Frans Mosman
- Eddy Kuijpers

Switzerland

- Gottfried von Meiss
- Roger Stirn
- Walo Hörning
- Corrado Schlaepfer
- Jean Rubli

United States

- Daniel Bukantz
- Dean Cetrulo
- Dernell Every
- Silvio Giolito
- Nate Lubell
- Austin Prokop

Uruguay

- Daniel Rossi
- Jaime Ucar
- Sergio Iesi
- Juan Paladino
- César Gallardo

== Results ==
=== Round 1 ===
The top two teams in each pool advanced to round 2.

==== Pool 1 ====
France and Egypt each won their bouts against Ireland without losing a single bout; the two victorious teams advanced without playing each other.

Rank	Nation	MW	ML	BW	BL	Notes
1	France	1	0	16	0	Q
2	Egypt	1	0	9	0	Q
3	Ireland	0	2	0	25	

==== Pool 2 ====
Italy and Uruguay each won their bouts against Greece; the two victorious teams advanced without playing each other.

Rank	Nation	MW	ML	BW	BL	Notes
1	Italy	1	0	16	0	Q
2	Uruguay	1	0	9	2	Q
3	Greece	0	2	2	25	

==== Pool 3 ====
Cuba withdrew before competition, resulting in Argentina and Finland advancing without any matches played.

Rank	Nation	MW	ML	BW	BL	Notes
1	Argentina	0	0	0	0	Q
1	Finland	0	0	0	0	Q
3	Cuba	0	0	0	0	Withdrew

==== Pool 4 ====
Hungary and the United States each won their bouts against Switzerland; the two victorious teams advanced without playing each other.

Rank	Nation	MW	ML	BW	BL	Notes
1	Hungary	1	0	11	5	Q
2	United States	1	0	9	3	Q
3	Switzerland	0	2	8	20	

==== Pool 5 ====
Austria and Brazil both withdrew before competition, leaving Belgium and Canada to advance without any matches being played..

Rank	Nation	MW	ML	BW	BL	Notes
1	Belgium	0	0	0	0	Q
1	Canada	0	0	0	0	Q
3	Austria	0	0	0	0	Withdrew
3	Brazil	0	0	0	0	Withdrew

==== Pool 6 ====
Denmark and Great Britain each beat the Netherlands; the two victorious teams advanced without playing each other. The match between Great Britain and the Netherlands was decided by hits against, with Great Britain winning 58 to 63.

Rank	Nation	MW	ML	BW	BL	Notes
1	Denmark	1	0	9	5	Q
2	Great Britain	1	0	8	8	Q
3	Netherlands	0	2	13	17	

=== Round 2 ===
The top two teams in each pool advanced to round 2.

==== Pool 1 ====
France and the United States each won their bouts against Canada without losing a single bout; the two victorious teams advanced without playing each other.

Rank	Nation	MW	ML	BW	BL	Notes
1	France	1	0	16	0	Q
2	United States	1	0	9	0	Q
3	Canada	0	2	0	25	

==== Pool 2 ====
Italy and Argentina each won their bouts against Finland; the two victorious teams advanced without playing each other.

Rank	Nation	MW	ML	BW	BL	Notes
1	Argentina	1	0	12	4	Q
2	Italy	1	0	9	0	Q
3	Finland	0	2	4	21	

==== Pool 3 ====
This was the only preliminary round pool to require the full set of three matches to be played. Belgium defeated Great Britain, 12–4. Great Britain defeated Denmark, 10–6. Belgium then beat Denmark, 9–3, to eliminate the Danes and secure advancement for the Belgians and British.

Rank	Nation	MW	ML	BW	BL	Notes
1	Belgium	2	0	21	3	Q
2	Great Britain	1	1	14	18	Q
3	Denmark	0	2	9	19	

==== Pool 4 ====
Hungary and Egypt each won their bouts against Uruguay; the two victorious teams advanced without playing each other. The match between Hungary and Uruguay was decided by hits against; Hungary won, 60–66.

Rank	Nation	MW	ML	BW	BL	Notes
1	Egypt	1	0	9	1	Q
2	Hungary	1	0	8	8	Q
3	Uruguay	0	2	9	17	

=== Semifinals ===
The top two teams in each pool advanced to the final.

==== Semifinal 1 ====
In the first pairings, Italy defeated Argentina 11–5 while Belgium beat Hungary 10–6. In the second round of matches, the same teams won—this time, Italy over Hungary 9–2 while Argentina withdrew after the first bout went to Belgium.

Rank	Nation	MW	ML	BW	BL	Notes
1	Italy	2	0	20	7	Q
2	Belgium	2	0	11	6	Q
3	Hungary	0	2	8	19	
4	Argentina	0	2	5	12	

==== Semifinal 2 ====
France won its two bouts, 13–3 over Egypt and 10–6 over Great Britain. Great Britain had its second 8–8 match of the tournament, this time losing on hits against to the United States, 60–64.The United States also beat Egypt, 9–5, to advance along with France.

Rank	Nation	MW	ML	BW	BL	Notes
1	France	2	0	23	9	Q
2	United States	2	0	17	13	Q
3	Great Britain	0	2	14	18	
4	Egypt	0	2	8	22	

=== Final ===
France (11–5 over the United States) and Italy (11–5 over Belgium) started off with wins. They swapped opponents in the second set of bouts and each won again (France 9–5 over Belgium and Italy 9–2 over the United States). That set up the Belgium–United States match as a de facto bronze medal match and the France-Italy match as the gold medal match. The Belgians defeated the Americans 9–7 to earn bronze. The France vs. Italy match resulted in 8 bouts won apiece. France prevailed on hits against, 60–62.

Rank	Nation	MW	ML	BW	BL
1st place, gold medalist(s)	France	3	0	28	18
2nd place, silver medalist(s)	Italy	2	1	28	15
3rd place, bronze medalist(s)	Belgium	1	2	19	27
4	United States	0	3	14	29
