= Finland at the 1952 Summer Olympics =

- IOC code: FIN
- NOC: Finnish Olympic Committee

in Helsinki
- Competitors: 258 (228 men, 30 women) in 18 sports
- Flag bearer: Väinö Suvivuo
- Medals Ranked 8th: Gold 6 Silver 3 Bronze 13 Total 22

Summer Olympics appearances (overview)
- 1908; 1912; 1920; 1924; 1928; 1932; 1936; 1948; 1952; 1956; 1960; 1964; 1968; 1972; 1976; 1980; 1984; 1988; 1992; 1996; 2000; 2004; 2008; 2012; 2016; 2020; 2024

Other related appearances
- 1906 Intercalated Games

Finland was the host nation for the 1952 Summer Olympics in Helsinki. 258 competitors, 228 men and 30 women, took part in 139 events in 18 sports. The nation won 22 medals.

== Basketball ==
Men's Team Competition

- Main Round (Group B)
  - Lost to Mexico (48–66)
  - Lost to Soviet Union (35–47)
  - Lost to Bulgaria (64–65) → did not advance, 16th place
- Team Roster
  - Juhani Kyöstilä
  - Raine Nuutinen
  - Raimo Lindholm
  - Timo Suviranta
  - Kauko Heinänen
  - Pentti Laaksonen
  - Oiva Virtanen
  - Esko Karhunen
  - Eero Salonen
  - Pertti Mutru
  - Tuomo Ristola
  - Tapio Pöyhönen

== Cycling ==
Road Competition

Men's Individual Road Race (190.4 km)

- Raino Koskenkorva — 5:23:34.6 (→ 42nd place)
- Paul Backman — did not finish (→ no ranking)
- Paul Nyman — did not finish (→ no ranking)
- Ruben Forsblom — did not finish (→ no ranking)

Track Competition

Men's 1.000m Time Trial

- Onni Kasslin
  - Final — 1:15.3 (→ 14th place)

Men's 1.000m Sprint Scratch Race

- Helge Törn — 27th and last place

== Diving ==
Men

Athlete	Event	Preliminary		Final	
Athlete	Event	Points	Rank	Points	Rank
Olavi Heinonen	3 m springboard	58.06	29	Did not advance	
Helge Vasenius	3 m springboard	65.41	14	Did not advance	
Birger Kivelä	10 m platform	67.31	13	Did not advance	

== Fencing ==
11 fencers, 8 men and 3 women, represented Finland in 1952.

Men's foil

- Kurt Lindeman
- Heikki Raitio

Men's épée

- Erkki Kerttula
- Rolf Wiik
- Heikki Raitio

Men's team épée

- Kauko Jalkanen, Erkki Kerttula, Rolf Wiik, Nils Sjöblom, Jaakko Vuorinen, Paavo Miettinen

Women's foil

- Maggie Kalka
- Marianne Sjöblom
- Taimi Mattsson

== Modern pentathlon ==
Three male pentathletes represented Finland in 1952, winning bronze in the team event.

Individual

- Ole Mannonen
- Lauri Vilkko
- Olavi Rokka

Team

- Ole Mannonen
- Lauri Vilkko
- Olavi Rokka

== Rowing ==
Finland had 26 male rowers participate in all seven rowing events in 1952.

Men's single sculls

- Sevi Holmsten

Men's double sculls

- Keijo Koivumäki
- Eero Koivumäki

Men's coxless pair

- Bengt Ahlström
- Stig Winter

Men's coxed pair

- Veijo Mikkolainen
- Toimi Pitkänen
- Erkki Lyijynen (cox)

Men's coxless four

- Veikko Lommi
- Kauko Wahlsten
- Oiva Lommi
- Lauri Nevalainen

Men's coxed four

- Kurt Grönholm
- Paul Stråhlman
- Birger Karlsson
- Karl-Erik Johansson
- Antero Tukiainen (cox)

Men's eight

- Tor Lundsten
- Birger Andersson
- Eero Lehtovirta
- Yrjö Hakoila
- Antti Arell
- Harry Wikman
- Esko Lyytikkä
- Klaus Lampi
- Toivo Räsänen (cox)

== Shooting ==
Eleven shooters represented Finland in 1952. Vilho Ylönen won a silver medal in the 50 m rifle, three positions and Tauno Mäki won a bronze medal in the 100m running deer.

25 m pistol

- Pentti Linnosvuo
- Veli-Jussi Hölsö

50 m pistol

- Klaus Lahti
- Oiva Tylli

300 m rifle, three positions

- Vilho Ylönen
- Pauli Janhonen

50 m rifle, three positions

- Vilho Ylönen
- Kullervo Leskinen

50 m rifle, prone

- Kullervo Leskinen
- Vilho Ylönen

100m running deer

- Tauno Mäki
- Yrjö Miettinen

Trap

- Konrad Huber
- Sven-Erik Rosenlew

== Swimming ==
Men

Ranks given are within the heat.

Athlete	Event	Heat		Semifinal		Final	
Athlete	Event	Time	Rank	Time	Rank	Time	Rank
Pentti Ikonen	100 m freestyle	1:01.1	5	Did not advance			
Leo Telivuo	100 m freestyle	1:02.0	5	Did not advance			
Mauno Valkeinen	100 m freestyle	1:02.5	6	Did not advance			
Einari Aalto	400 m freestyle	5:15.8	5	Did not advance			
Pentti Ikonen	400 m freestyle	4:55.7	5	Did not advance			
Pentti Paatsalo	400 m freestyle	5:09.3	6	Did not advance			
Erkki Marttinen	100 m backstroke	1:15.2	6	Did not advance			
Aulis Kähkönen	200 m breaststroke	2:43.8	4	Did not advance			
Juha Tikka	200 m breaststroke	2:46.3	4	Did not advance			
Pentti Ikonen; Pentti Paatsalo; Mauno Valkeinen; Leo Telivuo	4 × 200 m freestyle	9:26.6	6	—N/a		Did not advance	

Women

Ranks given are within the heat.

Athlete	Event	Heat		Semifinal		Final	
Athlete	Event	Time	Rank	Time	Rank	Time	Rank
Ritva Järvinen	100 m freestyle	1:11.5	5	Did not advance			
Ritva Koivula	100 m freestyle	1:17.3	7	Did not advance			
Raili Riuttala	100 m freestyle	1:13.5	7	Did not advance			
Ritva Järvinen	400 m freestyle	5:53.5	7	Did not advance			
Anneli Haaranen	100 m backstroke	1:21.7	6	—N/a		Did not advance	
Kaija Mäkelä	200 m breaststroke	3:04.7	4 Q	3:06.2	8	Did not advance	
Raili Riuttala; Ritva Koivula; Anneli Haaranen; Ritva Järvinen	4 × 100 m freestyle	4:56.0	7	—N/a		Did not advance	
