= Thuillier =

Thuillier is a surname. Notable people with the surname include:

- Élisabeth and Berthe Thuillier (fl. 1890s–1920s), French mother and daughter duo of colourists
- Émilie Thuillier, Canadian politician
- Emilio Thuillier (1868–1940), Spanish actor
- Harry Thuillier (1925–2011), Irish fencer and broadcaster
- Henry Edward Landor Thuillier (1813–1906), British surveyor in India
- Henry Fleetwood Thuillier (1868–1953), British Army officer
- Henry Shakespear Thuillier (1895–1982), British Army officer
- Henry Ravenshaw Thuillier (1838–1922), British surveyor in India
- Jacques Thuillier (1928–2011), French art historian
- Jean Thuillier (1921–2017), French novelist
- Leslie de Malapert Thuillier (1905–1999), British Army officer
- Louis Thuillier (1856–1883), French biologist
- Luc Thuillier (born 1964), French actor
- Nick Thuillier (1907–1983), Irish fencer
- Pierre Thuillier (1799–1858), French painter
- Thierry Thuillier (born 1963), French television journalist
