= Finland at the 1948 Summer Olympics =

- IOC code: FIN
- NOC: Finnish Olympic Committee

in London
- Competitors: 129 (123 men, 6 women) in 16 sports
- Flag bearer: Hannes Sonck
- Medals Ranked 6th: Gold 8 Silver 7 Bronze 5 Total 20

Summer Olympics appearances (overview)
- 1908; 1912; 1920; 1924; 1928; 1932; 1936; 1948; 1952; 1956; 1960; 1964; 1968; 1972; 1976; 1980; 1984; 1988; 1992; 1996; 2000; 2004; 2008; 2012; 2016; 2020; 2024; 2028

Other related appearances
- 1906 Intercalated Games

Finland competed at the 1948 Summer Olympics in London, England. 129 competitors, 123 men and 6 women, took part in 84 events in 16 sports. As the country was to host the next Olympics in Helsinki, the flag of Finland was flown at the closing ceremony.

== Medalists ==
Medal	Name	Sport	Event	Date
Gold	Lennart Viitala	Wrestling	Men's freestyle flyweight	31 July
Gold	Tapio Rautavaara	Athletics	Men's javelin throw	4 August
Gold	Veikko Huhtanen	Gymnastics	Men's artistic individual all-around	13 August
Gold	Paavo Aaltonen; Veikko Huhtanen; Kalevi Laitinen; Olavi Rove; Aleksanteri Saarvala; Sulo Salmi; Heikki Savolainen; Einari Teräsvirta	Gymnastics	Men's artistic team all-around	13 August
Gold	Paavo Aaltonen	Gymnastics	Men's pommel horse	13 August
Gold	Veikko Huhtanen	Gymnastics	Men's pommel horse	13 August
Gold	Heikki Savolainen	Gymnastics	Men's pommel horse	13 August
Gold	Paavo Aaltonen	Gymnastics	Men's vault	13 August
Silver	Kaisa Parviainen	Athletics	Women's javelin throw	31 July
Silver	Erkki Kataja	Athletics	Men's pole vault	2 August
Silver	Pauli Janhonen	Shooting	Men's 300 metre free rifle, three positions	6 August
Silver	Kelpo Gröndahl	Wrestling	Men's Greco-Roman light heavyweight	6 August
Silver	Kurt Wires	Canoeing	Men's K-1 10,000 metres	11 August
Silver	Veikko Huhtanen	Gymnastics	Men's parallel bars	13 August
Silver	Olavi Rove	Gymnastics	Men's vault	13 August
Bronze	Reino Kangasmäki	Wrestling	Men's Greco-Roman flyweight	6 August
Bronze	Thor Axelsson; Nils Björklöf	Canoeing	Men's K-2 10,000 metres	11 August
Bronze	Thor Axelsson; Nils Björklöf	Canoeing	Men's K-2 1000 metres	12 August
Bronze	Paavo Aaltonen	Gymnastics	Men's artistic individual all-around	13 August
Bronze	Veikko Huhtanen	Gymnastics	Men's horizontal bar	13 August

== Athletics ==
Key

- Note–Ranks given for track events are within the athlete's heat only
- Q = Qualified for the next round
- q = Qualified for the next round as a fastest loser or, in field events, by position without achieving the qualifying target
- NR = National record
- NH = No height
- DNF = Did not finish
- N/A = Round not applicable for the event
- Bye = Athlete not required to compete in round

Men
Track & road events

Athlete	Event	Heat		Quarterfinal		Semifinal		Final	
Athlete	Event	Result	Rank	Result	Rank	Result	Rank	Result	Rank
Runar Holmberg	400 metres	50.6	5	Did Not Advance					
Olavi Talja	400 metres	50.4	4	Did Not Advance					
Tauno Suvanto	400 metres	51.5	4	Did Not Advance					
Denis Johansson	1500 metres	3:54.0	3	—N/a				Unknown	12
Väinö Koskela	5000 metres	14:58.3	2	—N/a				14:41.0	7
Väinö Mäkelä	5000 metres	14:45.8	2	—N/a				14:43.0	8
Helge Perälä	5000 metres	15:07.8	4	—N/a				DNF	
Salomon Könönen	10,000 metres	—N/a						no time	9
Viljo Heino	10,000 metres	—N/a						DNF	
Evert Heinström	10,000 metres	—N/a						DNF	
Pentti Siltaloppi	3000 metres steeplechase	9:22.4	3	—N/a				9:19.6	5
Aarne Kainlauri	3000 metres steeplechase	9:25.8	2	—N/a				9:29.0	10
Tauno Suvanto; Olavi Talja; Runar Holmberg; Bebbe Storskrubb	4 × 400 m relay	3:20.6	1	—N/a				3:24.8	4
Viljo Heino	marathon	—N/a						2:41:32.0	11
Jussi Kurikkala	marathon	—N/a						2:42:48.0	13
Mikko Hietanen	marathon	—N/a						DNF	

Field events

Athlete	Event	Final	
Athlete	Event	Distance	Position
Valle Rautio	triple jump	14.700	6
Kuuno Honkonen	high jump	1.80	17
Nils Nicklén	high jump	NH	
Erkki Kataja	pole vault	4.20	2nd place, silver medalist(s)
Valto Olenius	pole vault	3.95	7
Yrjö Lehtilä	shot put	15.05	6
Jaakko Jouppila	shot put	14.59	7
Veikko Nyqvist	discus throw	47.33	6
Arvo Huutoniemi	discus throw	45.28	9
Tapio Rautavaara	javelin throw	69.77	1st place, gold medalist(s)
Pauli Vesterinen	javelin throw	65.89	4
Soini Nikkinen	javelin throw	58.05	12
Lauri Tamminen	hammer throw	53.08	5

Combined events – Decathlon

Athlete	Event	100 m	LJ	SP	HJ	400 m	110H	DT	PV	JT	1500 m	Final	Rank
Yrjö Mäkelä	Result	11.9	6.20	13.10	1.8	54.3	17.5	36.12	3.2	62.55	4:58	-	13
Yrjö Mäkelä	Points	618	603	725	786	656	597	600	575	835	426	6,421	13
Yrjö Mäkelä	Adjusted Points	—N/a										6,064	13
Hannes Sonck	Result	11.9	6.715	11.83	1.75	55.2	16.8	34.71	3.4	48.24	5:01.8	-	17
Hannes Sonck	Points	618	728	605	727	618	674	561	652	555	404	6,142	17
Hannes Sonck	Adjusted Points	—N/a										5,883	17

== Boxing ==
Flyweight

- Olli Lehtinen (=17th)

Bantamweight

- Olavi Ouvinen (=9th)

Featherweight

- Matti Tammelin (=17th)

Lightweight

- Tauno Rinkinen (=17th)

Middleweight

- Valle Resko (=17th)

Light heavyweight

- Harry Siljander (=5th)

== Canoeing ==
Men's K-1 1,000 metres

- Harry Åkerfelt (6th)

Men's K-1 10,000 metres

- Kurt Wires Silver

Men's K-2 1,000 metres

- Thor Axelsson, Nils Björklöf - Bronze

Men's K-2 10,000 metres

- Thor Axelsson, Nils Björklöf - Bronze

Women's 500 metres

- Sylvi Saimo (6th)

== Cycling ==
Five cyclists, all men, represented Finland in 1948.

Individual road race

- Paul Backman
- Torvald Högström
- Erkki Koskinen

Team road race

- Paul Backman
- Torvald Högström
- Erkki Koskinen

Time trial

- Onni Kasslin

Team pursuit

- Onni Kasslin
- Paavo Kuusinen
- Erkki Koskinen
- Torvald Högström

== Diving ==
Men

Athlete	Event	Final	
Athlete	Event	Points	Rank
Ilmari Niemeläinen	10 m platform	87.82	19

== Equestrian ==
Individual eventing

- Adolf Ehrnrooth and Lilia (20th)
- Mauno Roiha and Roa (28th)
- Arvo Haanpää and Upea DNF

Team eventing

- Adolf Ehrnrooth, Mauno Roiha, Arvo Haanpää DNF

Individual jumping

- Tauno Rissanen and Viser (23rd)
- Veikko Vartiainen and Pontus DNF

== Fencing ==
Six fencers, all men, represented Finland in 1948.

Men's foil

- Kauko Jalkanen
- Heikki Raitio

Men's team foil

- Kauko Jalkanen, Nils Sjöblom, Erkki Kerttula, Heikki Raitio

Men's épée

- Nils Sjöblom
- Erkki Kerttula
- Ilmari Vartia

Men's team épée

- Nils Sjöblom, Olavi Larkas, Erkki Kerttula, Ilmari Vartia, Kauko Jalkanen

Men's sabre

- Erkki Kerttula
- Nils Sjöblom
- Kauko Jalkanen

== Gymnastics ==
Gymnast	Event	Score	Rank
Veikko Huhtanen	Men's all-around	229.7	Gold
Paavo Aaltonen	Men's all-around	228.8	Bronze
Kalevi Laitinen	Men's all-around	225.65	8th
Olavi Rove	Men's all-around	225.2	=10th
Einari Teräsvirta	Men's all-around	225.0	12th
Heikki Savolainen	Men's all-around	223.95	14th
Aleksanteri Saarvala	Men's all-around	221.1	17th
Sulo Salmi	Men's all-around	217.45	31st
Veikko Huhtanen	Men's team all-around		Gold
Paavo Aaltonen	Men's team all-around		Gold
Kalevi Laitinen	Men's team all-around		Gold
Olavi Rove	Men's team all-around		Gold
Einari Teräsvirta	Men's team all-around		Gold
Heikki Savolainen	Men's team all-around		Gold
Aleksanteri Saarvala	Men's team all-around		Gold
Sulo Salmi	Men's team all-around		Gold
Veikko Huhtanen	Men's horizontal bar	39.2	Bronze
Aleksanteri Saarvala	Men's horizontal bar	38.8	=4th
Einari Teräsvirta	Men's horizontal bar	38.7	8th
Paavo Aaltonen	Men's horizontal bar	38.4	=12th
Kalevi Laitinen	Men's horizontal bar	38.1	14th
Sulo Salmi	Men's horizontal bar	38.0	=15th
Olavi Rove	Men's horizontal bar	37.4	24th
Heikki Savolainen	Men's horizontal bar	37.1	29th
Veikko Huhtanen	Men's parallel bars	39.3	Silver
Heikki Savolainen	Men's parallel bars	38.9	6th
Paavo Aaltonen	Men's parallel bars	38.8	=7th
Olavi Rove	Men's parallel bars	38.6	10th
Einari Teräsvirta	Men's parallel bars	38.4	12th
Kalevi Laitinen	Men's parallel bars	38.1	=16th
Aleksanteri Saarvala	Men's parallel bars	37.6	24th
Sulo Salmi	Men's parallel bars	36.8	31st
Heikki Savolainen	Men's pommel horse	38.7	= Gold
Veikko Huhtanen	Men's pommel horse	38.7	= Gold
Paavo Aaltonen	Men's pommel horse	38.7	= Gold
Aleksanteri Saarvala	Men's pommel horse	37.7	=8th
Einari Teräsvirta	Men's pommel horse	37.0	18th
Kalevi Laitinen	Men's pommel horse	36.9	=19th
Olavi Rove	Men's pommel horse	36.5	=23rd
Sulo Salmi	Men's pommel horse	35.2	=45th
Heikki Savolainen	Men's rings	38.1	8th
Olavi Rove	Men's rings	37.9	=9th
Veikko Huhtanen	Men's rings	37.8	=11th
Kalevi Laitinen	Men's rings	37.4	16th
Paavo Aaltonen	Men's rings	37.3	=17th
Sulo Salmi	Men's rings	37.3	=17th
Aleksanteri Saarvala	Men's rings	37.3	=17th
Einari Teräsvirta	Men's rings	36.8	=27th
Paavo Aaltonen	Men's vault	39.1	Gold
Olavi Rove	Men's vault	39.0	Silver
Veikko Huhtanen	Men's vault	38.4	6th
Einari Teräsvirta	Men's vault	38.3	7th
Sulo Salmi	Men's vault	38.1	=8th
Kalevi Laitinen	Men's vault	38.0	=10th
Aleksanteri Saarvala	Men's vault	36.8	=40th
Heikki Savolainen	Men's vault	36.5	=48th
Kalevi Laitinen	Men's floor	37.15	13th
Paavo Aaltonen	Men's floor	36.5	=29th
Veikko Huhtanen	Men's floor	36.3	=34th
Olavi Rove	Men's floor	35.8	=47th
Einari Teräsvirta	Men's floor	35.8	=47th
Heikki Savolainen	Men's floor	34.65	=58th
Aleksanteri Saarvala	Men's floor	33.9	=67th
Sulo Salmi	Men's floor	32.05	=79th

== Modern pentathlon ==
Three male pentathletes represented Finland in 1948.

- Lauri Vilkko
- Olavi Larkas
- Viktor Platan

== Rowing ==
Finland had five male rowers participate in one out of seven rowing events in 1948.

Men's coxed four

- Veikko Lommi
- Helge Forsberg
- Oiva Lommi
- Osrik Forsberg
- Veli Autio (cox)

== Sailing ==
Finland was represented in sailing in four classes by 12 male competitors.

Firefly class (one person dinghy)

- Eric Palmgren (15th)

Star class (two person keelboat)

- René Nyman, Christian Ilmoni (12th)

Dragon class (three person keelboat)

- Rainer Packalén, Aatos Hirvisalo, Niilo Orama (6th)

6 metre class

- Ernst Westerlund, Rote Hellström, Ragnar Jansson, Adolf Konto, Rolf Turkka, Valo Urho (9th)

== Shooting ==
Twelve shooters represented Finland in 1948. Pauli Janhonen won a silver medal in the 300 m rifle event.

25 metre pistol

- Leo Ravilo
- Väinö Heusala
- Jaakko Rintanen

50 metre pistol

- Eino Saarnikko
- Klaus Lahti
- Väinö Skarp

300 metre rifle

- Pauli Janhonen
- Kullervo Leskinen
- Olavi Elo

50 metre rifle

- Albert Ravila
- Veijo Kaakinen
- Onni Hynninen

== Swimming ==
Women

Ranks given are within the heat.

Athlete	Event	Heat		Semifinal		Final	
Athlete	Event	Time	Rank	Time	Rank	Time	Rank
Margit Leskinen	200 m breaststroke	3:11.4	3	3:10.0	6	Did not advance	

== Wrestling ==
Men's freestyle flyweight

- Lenni Viitala Gold

Men's freestyle bantamweight

- Erkki Johansson AC

Men' freestyle featherweight

- Paavo Hietala (=4th)

Men's freestyle lightweight

- Sulo Leppänen (=6th)

Men's freestyle welterweight

- Aleksanteri Keisala AC

Men's freestyle middleweight

- Paavo Sepponen (5th)

Men's freestyle light heavyweight

- Pekka Mellavuo AC

Men's Greco-Roman flyweight

- Reino Kangasmäki Bronze

Men's Greco-Roman bantamweight

- Taisto Lempinen (4th)

Men's Greco-Roman featherweight

- Erkki Talosela (=6th)

Men's Greco-Roman lightweight

- Eero Virtanen (=6th)

Men's Greco-Roman welterweight

- Veikko Männikkö (=4th)

Men's Greco-Roman middleweight

- Juho Kinnunen (6th)

Men's Greco-Roman light heavyweight

- Kelpo Gröndahl Silver

Men's Greco-Roman heavyweight

- Taisto Kangasniemi (4th)

== See also ==
- Finnish Sauna Bath London 1948
