= Henry Thuillier =

Henry Thuillier may refer to:

- Sir Henry Ravenshaw Thuillier (1838–1922), Surveyor General of India
- Sir Henry Fleetwood Thuillier (1868–1953), British Army officer
- Henry Shakespear Thuillier (1895–1982), British Army officer
- Sir Henry Edward Landor Thuillier (1813–1906), Surveyor General of India

== See also ==
- Harry Thuillier (1922–2011), Irish fencer, table tennis player and broadcaster
