= Uruguay at the 1948 Summer Olympics =

- IOC code: URU
- NOC: Uruguayan Olympic Committee

in London
- Competitors: 61 (60 men and 1 woman) in 11 sports
- Medals Ranked 26th: Gold 0 Silver 1 Bronze 1 Total 2

Summer Olympics appearances (overview)
- 1924; 1928; 1932; 1936; 1948; 1952; 1956; 1960; 1964; 1968; 1972; 1976; 1980; 1984; 1988; 1992; 1996; 2000; 2004; 2008; 2012; 2016; 2020; 2024; 2028

Uruguay competed at the 1948 Summer Olympics in London, United Kingdom. 61 competitors, 60 men and 1 woman, took part in 32 events in 11 sports.

== Medalists ==
=== Silver ===
- Eduardo Risso — Rowing, Men's Single Sculls

=== Bronze ===
- William Jones and Juan Rodriquez — Rowing, Men's Double Sculls

== Athletics ==
- Hércules Azcune
- Mario Fayos
- Juan López Testa
- Walter Pérez Soto
- Pedro Listur

== Basketball ==
- Martín Acosta y Lara
- Victorio Cieslinskas
- Nelson Demarco
- Miguel Diab
- Abraham Eidlin Grossman
- Eduardo Folle
- Héctor García
- Eduardo Gordon
- Adesio Lombardo
- Roberto Lovera
- Gustavo Morales
- Carlos Rosello
- Héctor Ruiz
- Nelson Antón Giudice

== Boxing ==
- Alberto Boullosa
- Basilio Álvez
- Pedro Carrizo
- Feliciano Rossano
- Guillermo Porteiro
- Felipe Posse
- Dogomar Martínez
- Agustín Muñiz

== Cycling ==
Nine male cyclists represented Uruguay in 1948.

Individual road race

- Waldemar Bernatzky
- Enrique Demarco
- Mario Figueredo
- Luis López

Team road race

- Waldemar Bernatzky
- Enrique Demarco
- Mario Figueredo
- Luis López

Sprint

- Leonel Rocca

Time trial

- Carlos Tramutolo

Team pursuit

- Atilio François
- Juan de Armas
- Luis Ángel de los Santos
- Waldemar Bernatzky

== Fencing ==
Five fencers, all men, represented the Uruguay in 1948.

Men's foil

- Sergio Iesi
- Daniel Rossi
- Jaime Ucar

Men's team foil

- Daniel Rossi, Jaime Ucar, Sergio Iesi, Juan Paladino, César Gallardo

Men's sabre

- Juan Paladino

== Modern pentathlon ==
Three male pentathletes represented the Uruguay in 1948.

- Alberto Ortíz
- Carlos Mercader
- Ruben Orozco

== Rowing ==
Uruguay had three male rowers participate in two out of seven rowing events in 1948.

Men's single sculls

- Eduardo Risso

Men's double sculls

- William Jones
- Juan Rodríguez

== Swimming ==
Men

Athlete	Event	Heat		Semifinal		Final	
Athlete	Event	Time	Rank	Time	Rank	Time	Rank
Florbel Pérez	400 m freestyle	5:04.7	20	Did not advance			
Florbel Pérez	1500 m freestyle	20:20.2	9 Q	20:32.6	11	Did not advance	
Carlos Noriega	100 m backstroke	1:15.0	4	Did not advance			

== Water polo ==
- Ramón Abella
