= Fencing Ireland =

Governing body for the sport of fencing in Ireland

- Sport: Fencing
- Jurisdiction: Ireland
- Founded: 1933
- Affiliation: FIE
- Affiliation date: 1935
- Regional affiliation: EFC
- Headquarters: Sport Ireland campus, Abbotstown, Dublin 15, Ireland
- President: Ursula Kappus
- Secretary: Patrick Dight
- Replaced: Irish Fencing Federation, Irish Amateur Fencing Federation

Official website
- www.fencingireland.net
- Other key staff: Honorary Treasurer: Yvonne Murphy
- (Republic of Ireland)

'

Fencing Ireland (Irish: Pionsóireacht Éireann) – formerly the Irish Fencing Federation (IFF; Irish: Cumann Pionsóireachta na hÉireann) – is the governing body for the sport of fencing in Ireland. It was formally established in 1933, although the sport of fencing has been practised in Ireland since the beginning of the 1900s. The Federation is recognised by Sport Ireland and the Olympic Council of Ireland, and it is also affiliated to the Federation Internationale d'Escrime and European Fencing Confederation.

== Name ==
The organisation was established as the Irish Amateur Fencing Federation (IAFF) in 1933, and remained under that title until 2008 when it was reconstituted as the Irish Fencing Federation; the current trading name was adopted in 2016.

== Role ==
As the national governing body, Fencing Ireland takes responsibility for running two of the largest events in the Irish calendar: the National Championships and the Irish Open. In 2006, the Irish Open was designated an FIE Satellite World Cup for the Men's Épée discipline. The lure of world ranking points has brought some of the biggest names in international fencing to compete in Dublin.

== History ==
The earliest record of fencing as a recreational sport is believed to come from a medal held in the National Museum of Ireland presented by the Earl of Charlemont in 1781 to a Sergeant More for swordsmanship.

Fencing has been included in the Olympic Games since their modern-day inception in 1896.

In 1935, wishing to provide opportunities for international competition to its members, the IAFF applied for and was granted membership of the Federation d'Escrime Internationale.

=== Clubs ===
Former logo of the IAFF and IFF, used until 2016

Fencing clubs have been established in most major colleges in Ireland.

== Competition ==
In 1948, Ireland sent its first fencers to the Olympics in London. Tom Smith, Harry Thuillier and Owen Tuohy competed in the individual foil event and were joined by Paddy Duffy for the team event. Foilist Dorothy 'Tommy' Dermody was the first female fencer to represent Ireland at the Olympics.

Fencing Ireland includes six tier A competitions in their annual competitions calendar.
