= Patrick Duffy (fencer) =

Irish fencer (1921–1987)

Personal information
- Nationality: Irish
- Born: Patrick Joseph Duffy; 5 April 1921 Dublin, Ireland
- Died: 18 October 1987 (aged 66) Dublin, Ireland

Sport
- Sport: Fencing

Patrick Joseph Duffy (5 April 1921 – 18 October 1987) was an Irish fencer. He competed at the 1948 and 1952 Summer Olympics. He was a fencing master (Maître d'armes).

== Career ==
Duffy began fencing competitively in 1946. Two years later, he made his first Olympic début representing Ireland with the Irish fencing team at the 1948 Summer Olympics, officially known as the Games of the XIV Olympiad. The Summer Olympic Games were held at the Palace of Engineering, Wembley, in London, England in July 1948. The 1948 Summer Olympics were the first games to be held since the 1936 Olympics in Berlin, due to World War II.

Duffy was among the first five fencers to compete for Ireland in the Olympics, all of whom competed in the 1948 event. He represented his country, on behalf of the Irish Fencing Federation (IFF), alongside three other men, Harry Thuillier, Owen Tuohy, and Tom Smith, and Dorothy Dermody. At the age of 27, Duffy competed with the Irish Men's Foil team, making him the youngest participant to compete for the Irish fencing team that summer. He was the only Irish participant to compete solely in team events, while the three other men also competed in the individual foil events. The team were unsuccessful in the first round of the competition after losing against both the French and Egyptian foil teams, eliminating them from the competition, and ending their chances of an Olympic medal.

At the age of 31, Duffy made his second Olympic appearance representing Ireland at the 1952 Helsinki Summer Olympic Games, officially known as the Games of the XV Olympiad. The games were held at the Westend Tennis Hall in Espoo city, Finland. Duffy attended the games alongside three other Irish fencers, George Carpenter, Harry Thuillier and Tom Kearney. He competed in the men’s individual foil event between 23 and 24 July 1952, and later that week he also competed in the men’s individual épée event between 27 and 28 July 1952. He competed in round one of the men’s individual foil event, and round one of the men’s épée event. However, he was unsuccessful in both events, and failed to rank in the top four finishers which would have resulted in his advancement to the quarter finals.
