= Giolito =

Giolito is a surname. Notable people with the surname include:

- Gabriele Giolito de' Ferrari (c. 1508–1578), Italian printer
- Lucas Giolito (born 1994), American baseball player
- Malin Persson Giolito (born 1969), Swedish author and lawyer
- Roberto Giolito (born 1962), Italian automobile designer
- Silvio Giolito (1918–2006), American foil fencer
