= DUFC =

DUFC may refer to:

- Dalton United F.C., an association football club in Dalton-in-Furness, England
- Dolphins United F.C., an association football club in the Philippines
- Dookie United Football Club, an Australian rules football club
- Drogheda United F.C., an association football club in Drogheda, Ireland
- Dublin University Fencing Club, a fencing club in Dublin, Ireland
- Dublin University Football Club, a rugby union club in Dublin, Ireland
- Dundee United F.C., an association football club in Dundee, Scotland
