= Malapert =

Malapert might refer to:

== People ==
- Charles Malapert, Jesuit scientist
- Leslie de Malapert Thuillier, military personnel in the British Army
- Robert-Georg Freiherr von Malapert, military personnel in the Luftwaffe

== Other ==
- Malapert, a series of Lunar features
