= Koivula (surname) =

Koivula is a Finnish surname. Notable people with the surname include:

- Ritva Koivula (1933–2025), Finnish swimmer
- Ilkka Koivula (born 1966), Finnish actor
- Heli Koivula Kruger (born 1975), Finnish track and field athlete
- Jussi Koivula (born 1983), Finnish professional boxer
- Otto Koivula (born 1998), Finnish professional ice hockey forward
