= Dublin University Fencing Club =

Fencing club of Trinity College Dublin

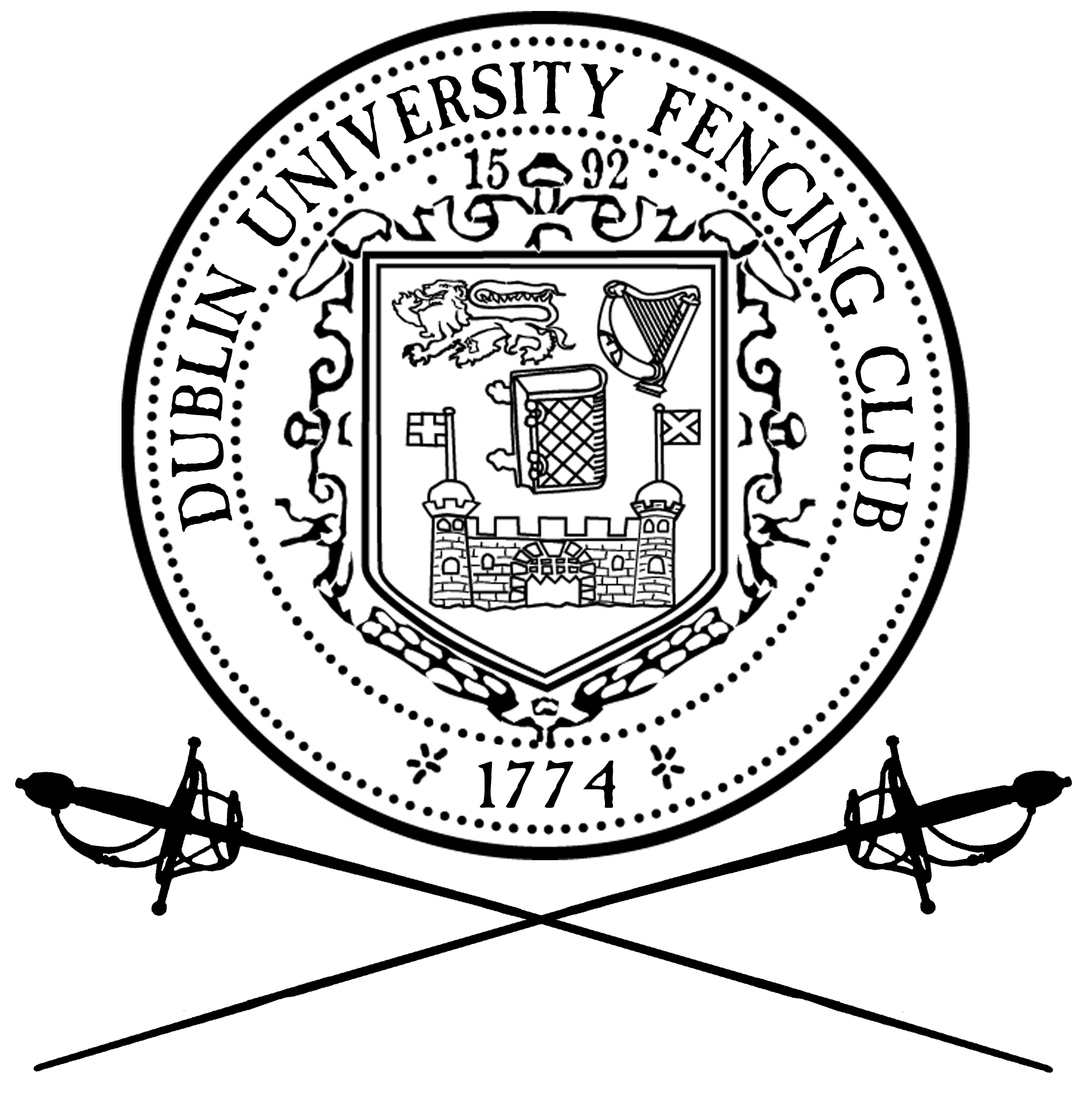
- Founded: 1936; 90 years ago
- Location: Dublin, Ireland, (Republic of Ireland)
- President: Rory Greenan
- Head Coach: Dr. Colm Nouvian-Flynn
- Club Captain: Emma Murphy
- Men's Captain: James McCartney
- Website: www.trinityfencing.ie
- Club colours

Dublin University Fencing Club (DUFC) is the fencing club of Trinity College Dublin, located in Dublin, Ireland. The club caters for foil, épée and sabre. Its members are students, alumni and staff from Trinity College with a small amount of visiting fencers from other clubs.

== Early history ==
In 1730, a group of students from Trinity College formed a Gentleman's Club of the Sword, or the Gentleman's Society of the Sword as it has also been called. This club, while initially hugely popular fell out of use by the last quarter of the 18th century. In 1774, Provost John Hely-Hutchinson formally established fencing in Trinity by employing a fencing-master and designating the Senate House specifically for this purpose. With the further decline of duelling throughout the 18th and no record of the club throughout the 19th century, it is not until the formation of the modern D.U. Fencing Club in 1936 that the sport was reestablished in the college.

== Present status ==
Since its foundation, DUFC has grown vastly. In the late 1960s and early 1970s, membership was about fifty fencers in general with an Intervarsities team of 8. In contrast, the 2009/2010 season saw intake of approximately 300 new members with an Intervarsities contingent of 24 competing, with similar numbers maintained in the club since.

The club's most decorated coach, Professor Patrick Duffy, coached the club from 1952 until 1987. Following his death in 1987, The Professor Duffy Memorial Team Épée tournament was inaugurated by D.U.Fencing Club. This competition is still run today and attracts teams from Germany, Italy and the U.K. regularly.

The club has maintained its status as a centre of excellence, consistently ranking at the top of the national club medal table in Ireland. During the 2017/18 season, Dublin University Fencing Club became part of the Trinity Sport high performance programme, giving its first team access to additional strength and conditioning coaching, physiotherapy, anti-doping and nutritional expertise.

The club has been awarded Trinity Sport's Club of the Year award twice, first in 2017 and again in 2025.

== Captains ==
Each year the club has a Club Captain who chairs the club committee and who also hold the relevant role of Men's or Women's Captain. There is also a second captain who holds the other Men's or Women's Captain role.

Year	Club Captain	Women's/Men's Captain
2000/01	Nat O'Connor	
2001/02	Suzanne Clayton	
2002/03	Ken Suzuki	
2003/04	James Stratford	
2004/05	Colm Flynn	Kate Harvey
2005/06	Aoife Brown	Colm Flynn
2006/07	Colin Couper	
2007/08	Lachlan Sykes	Maria Treacy
2008/09	Louis Arron	Kate Harvey
2009/10	Declan Gibbons	Liz Fitzgerald
2010/11	Alexander Kelly	Helen Naddy
2011/12	Edward Mitchell	Hannah Lowry O'Reilly
2012/13	Conor Traynor	Clodagh McCarthy Luddy
2013/14	Maxton Milner	Emily Greenan
2014/15	Tadhg Garton	Rebecca Ryan
2015/16	Sean Healy	Olivia Murray
2016/17	James Bryant	Lucy Johnson
2017/18	Sam Mitchell	Manon Nouvian
2018/19	Bethany Rush	Donncdha Carroll
2019/20	Stephen Grogan	Dearbhaile Collins
2020/21	Angie Parissi	Luke Dowling
2021/22	James Cole	Crystal Percival
2022/23	Cathal Maguire	Isabelle Clarke
2023/24	Adri Hrabowych	William Mac Donald Hughes
2024/25	Katie Lynch	Cathal Maguire
2025/26	Liam Zone	Katie Lynch
2026/27	Emma Murphy	James McCartney

== Notable alumni ==
Since the formation of the modern club, a number of members have gone on to represent the club and their country in both fencing and the modern pentathlon. Some of these members are listed below.

- Patrick Duffy, competed at the 1948 and 1952 Summer Olympics
- Harry Thuillier, competed in foil at the 1952 and 1960 Summer Olympics
- Shirley Armstrong, competed in the women's individual foil event at the 1960 Summer Olympics
- Brian Hamilton, competed in the individual foil and team épée events at the 1960 Summer Olympics
- Colm Murrogh Vere O'Brien, competed at the 1968 Summer Olympics
- Natalya Coyle, competed at the 2012, 2016, and 2020 Summer Olympics in the modern pentathlon

== Competitions ==
=== Hosted competitions ===
D.U.Fencing Club hosts a number of competitions on an annual basis. Events currently hosted are listed below:

- The Professor Duffy Memorial Team Épée
- Trinity Cup
- Trinity Team Foil
- Dublin Épée

=== The Colours Match ===
Known colloquially as Colours, The Colours Match (the fencing equivalent of its rugby counterpart) is hosted yearly between Dublin University and University College Dublin with each club cycling hosting privileges yearly.

== Honours ==
=== Pinks ===
Pinks are awarded for outstanding service to a sports club, usually with regard to representative honours, by the Central Athletic Club (D.U.C.A.C.). Athletes in D.U.Fencing Club who have received pinks are listed below followed by the year of the award.

Name of recipients	Date Pinks awarded
J. M. Stubbs	Friday, November 21, 1952
M. A. H. McCausland	Tuesday, November 10, 1953
Alistair Gordon Taylor	Monday, May 17, 1954
John Howard English	Friday, November 15, 1957
Malcom Richard Boyd	Friday, June 19, 1959
Brian Michael Carew Hamilton	Friday, November 11, 1960
Christopher Francis Rye	Saturday, October 28, 1961
John James Michael Laud Robinson	Friday, November 15, 1963
Vernon Walter Fowler Armstrong	Friday, November 27, 1964
Penelope Mary Johnston Greene	Monday, November 29, 1965
Colm Murrough Vere O'Brien	Monday, May 2, 1966
Paul Nicholson	Monday, November 27, 1967
William Andrew Lambert Heaton	Wednesday, January 28, 1970
Sean Gillespie	Wednesday, May 10, 1972
Richard George Booth	Friday, May 14, 1976
Nial Charles Ferguson	Thursday, May 8, 1980
Marcus Joseph Austin	Monday, November 24, 1980
Catherine Patricia Ridge	Wednesday, May 4, 1983
Richard John Mitchell	Thursday, May 3, 1984
Mark Davis	Thursday, December 6, 1984
Richard John Mulkeen	Thursday, May 5, 1988
Síle O'Connor	Tuesday, December 4, 1990
Paul John Thomas Bouchier-Hayes	Wednesday, May 6, 1998
Kate Harvey	Thursday, April 27, 2006
David DelanyCahill	Thursday, February 28, 2008
Colm Nouvian-Flynn	Thursday, February 28, 2008
Kate Harvey	Thursday, February 28, 2008
Lachlan Sykes	Thursday, April 17, 2008
Louis Arron	Wednesday, February 17, 2010
Maria Treacy	Wednesday, February 17, 2010
Hannah Lowry-O'Reilly	Friday, March 11, 2011
Maxton Milner	Thursday, March 19, 2015
Phillip Cripwell	Tuesday, December 6, 2016
Lucy Johnson	Tuesday, December 6, 2016
Camille Boelt Hindsgaul	Monday, March 26, 2018
Tadhg Garton	Monday, March 26, 2018
Sam Mitchell	Wednesday, May 1, 2019
Ross Byrne	Wednesday, May 1, 2019
Manon Nouvian-Flynn	Wednesday, December 9, 2020
William Silvain Michael Mac Donald Hughes	Tuesday, May 7, 2024
Liam John Davidson Zone	Wednesday, May 7, 2025
Katie Lynch	Wednesday, May 7, 2025
Eoghan Ó hAnluain Fay	Tuesday, May 5, 2026
