= Leslie de Malapert Thuillier =

British Army general (1905-1999)

Leslie de Malapert Thuillier CB CVO OBE
- Leslie de Malapert Thuillier
- Born: 26 September 1905
- Died: 23 March 1999 (aged 93)
- Military career
- Branch: British Army
- Rank: Major-general
- Unit: Royal Corps of Signals
- Conflicts: World War II
- Father: Maj-General Sir Henry Fleetwood Thuillier
- Relatives: Henry Ravenshaw Thuillier (grandfather); Henry Edward Landor Thuillier (great-grandfather)

Major-General Leslie "Pete" de Malapert Thuillier, CB, CVO, OBE, (26 September 1905 – 23 March 1999) was a British Army officer of the Royal Corps of Signals who served with distinction in the Second World War and later set up the hotline between 10 Downing Street and The White House.

His grandfather was Henry Ravenshaw Thuillier, and his great-grandfather was Henry Edward Landor Thuillier, both Surveyors General of India.

== Selected publications ==
- Everest Observed
