= Jehan Buhan =

French fencer (1912–1999)

Jéhan de Buhan
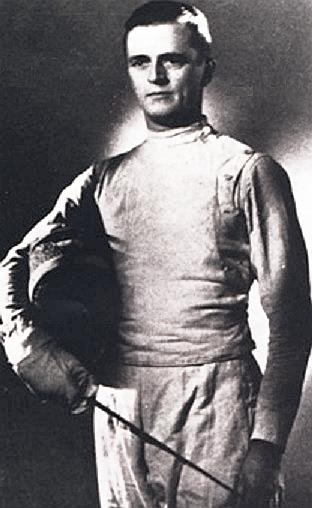

Personal information
- Born: 5 April 1912 Bordeaux, France
- Died: 14 September 1999 (aged 87) Bordeaux, France

Fencing career
- Sport: Fencing
- Country: France
Medal record
Men's fencing
Representing France
Olympic Games
Gold medal – first place	1948 London	Individual foil
Gold medal – first place	1948 London	Team foil
Gold medal – first place	1952 Helsinki	Team foil

Jehan Buhan (5 April 1912 – 14 September 1999) was a French fencer and Olympic champion in foil competition.

He received a gold medal in foil individual at the 1948 Summer Olympics in London. He received gold medals in foil team both in 1948 and in 1952.

== Biography ==
His uncle introduced him to his sport, taking him at the age of 10 to train to Master Roy in Arcachon. As a teenager, he also played field hockey for Villa Primrose in Bordeaux.

Trained by Master Biohain from the age of 17(room of personal weapon rue du Palais Gallien and Parliament-Sainte-Catherine in Bordeaux), he arrived in Paris in 1936 with a law degree and a diploma of Bordeaux Business School with him. He then enrolled in the military circle whose Master of Arms was Mr. Dodiver. In 1940 he was shortlisted to compete in the Helsinki Olympics ... when the war broke out.

He then spent five years in captivity, only touching the foil in Dresden for a few weeks in a makeshift room devastated by a fire, before returning to Bordeaux. In 1946, already 33 years old, he managed to be vice-champion of France, before becoming vice-world champion in 1947 in Lisbon, behind the young Oriola, the two men then obtaining the world title of foil by team.

Wine merchant of his state for the Adet cognac, he comes to 36, after a preparation in June to the Joinville battalion, to participate in the Olympiad organized in London in 1948 to align with the sword, .. but the circumstances make it finally retained for the foil. He will start with two gold medals, winning all seven events in the tournament, setting a record total of 24–1, and beating the 19-year- old Christian d'Oriola in the individual final.. Because of his job, Buhan sent for the team final a box of bottles of red which he had guessed the interest ... gold result at the key toJacques Lataste, André Bonin, Adrien Rommel, René Bougnol, d'Oriola and himself 1 .

His father was President of the Federation of Southwest fencing in the late 1920s 2 .

Father of three sons, Jehan Buhan was also a hunting enthusiast woodcock and pheasant in the Gironde moors, as well as trout fishing -in mouche- in the Pyrenean streams 3 .

Since 2006, it has given rise to an annual fencing challenge bearing its name, under the auspices of Union Sportive du Bouscat, in Union Sports Hall Bouscataise Escrime - inaugurated in September 2013 and equipped with 8 integrated tracks, equipped electrically for the 3 weapons- sports complex still bearing his name.
