= Adrien Rommel =

French fencer (1914–1963)

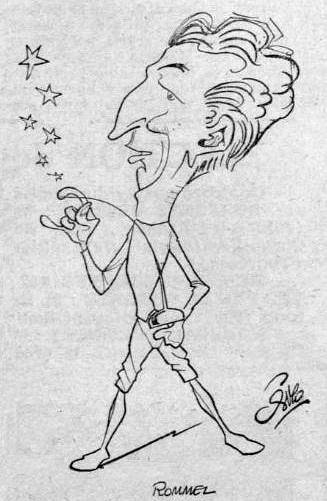

Personal information
- Born: 4 August 1914 Paris, France
- Died: 21 June 1963 (aged 48)

Sport
- Sport: Fencing
Medal record
Men's fencing
Representing France
Olympic Games
| Gold medal – first place | 1948 London | Team foil |
| Gold medal – first place | 1952 Helsinki | Team foil |
Mediterranean Games
| Gold medal – first place | 1955 Barcelona | Team foil |
| Silver medal – second place | 1951 Alexandria | Team foil |

Adrien Rommel (4 August 1914 – 21 June 1963) was a French fencer. He won a gold medal in the team foil events at the 1948 and 1952 Summer Olympics. He also competed at the Mediterranean Games in 1951 where he won a silver medal in the team foil event and in 1955 where he won a gold medal in the team foil event.
