= Édouard Yves =

Belgian fencer (1907–1999)

Personal information
- Born: Édouard Émile Gustave Yves; 26 October 1907 Katako-Kombe, Congo Free State
- Died: 12 July 1999 (aged 91) Uccle, Belgium

Sport
- Sport: Fencing
Medal record
Men's fencing
Representing Belgium
Olympic Games
Bronze medal – third place	1948 London	Foil, team

Édouard Émile Gustave Yves (26 October 1907 – 12 July 1999) was a Belgian Olympic foil and sabre fencer. He won a bronze medal in the team foil event at the 1948 Summer Olympics.

In total, he had 3 Olymipic Appearances, the very first one being in the 1928 Amsterdam Olympics.

Yves died in Uccle, Belgium on 12 July 1999, at the age of 91.
