= Lucas Giolito =

American baseball player (born 1994)

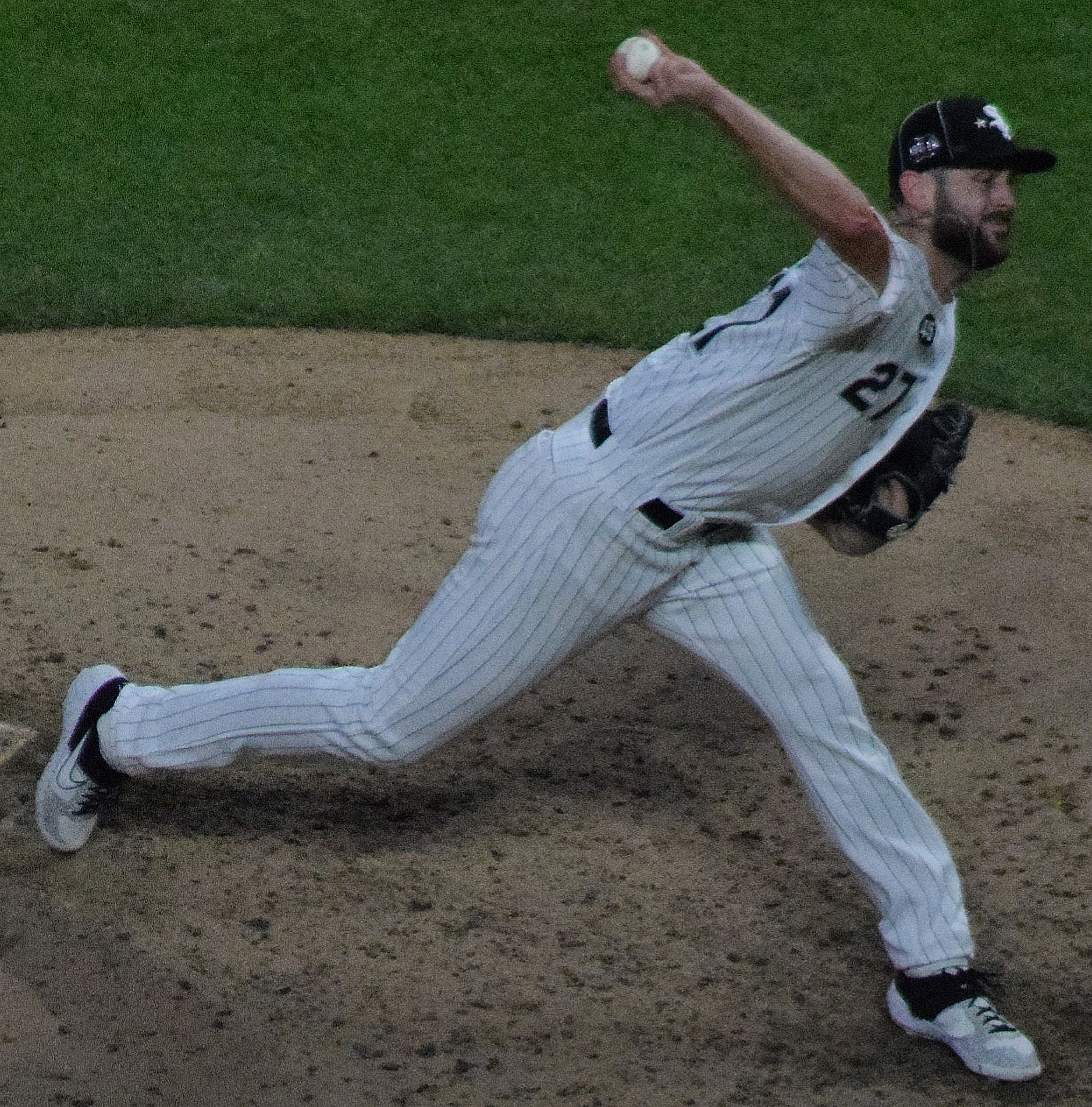
- Giolito with the Chicago White Sox in 2019

Free agent
- Pitcher
- Born: July 14, 1994 (age 32); Burbank, California, U.S.
- Bats: Right Throws: Right

MLB debut
- June 28, 2016, for the Washington Nationals

MLB statistics (through 2026 season)
- Win–loss record: 73–69
- Earned run average: 4.32
- Strikeouts: 1,216
- Stats at Baseball Reference

Teams
- Washington Nationals (2016); Chicago White Sox (2017–2023); Los Angeles Angels (2023); Cleveland Guardians (2023); Boston Red Sox (2025); San Diego Padres (2026)

Career highlights and awards
- All-Star (2019); Pitched a no-hitter on August 25, 2020

Lucas Frost Giolito (born July 14, 1994) is an American professional baseball pitcher who is a free agent. He has previously played in MLB for the Washington Nationals, Chicago White Sox, Los Angeles Angels, Cleveland Guardians, Boston Red Sox, and San Diego Padres.

Giolito attended Harvard-Westlake School in Studio City, California, and was selected by the Nationals in the first round in the 2012 MLB draft. He made his MLB debut with the Nationals in 2016. His fastball has been clocked as high as 100 miles per hour (160 km/h).

In 2019, as a member of the White Sox, he was named to the MLB All-Star Game. On August 25, 2020, he threw a no-hitter in a 4–0 victory over the Pittsburgh Pirates.

== Early life ==
Giolito was born at Providence Saint Joseph Medical Center in Burbank, California, on July 14, 1994. He grew up in Santa Monica, California. Giolito began playing tee-ball at the age of 5, and he played Little League Baseball at Santa Monica Little League. He threw his very first 90-mile-per-hour (140 km/h) pitch at the age of 14.

== Amateur career ==
Giolito attended Harvard-Westlake School in Studio City, Los Angeles, California. He was part of a Harvard-Westlake baseball team that included Max Fried and Jack Flaherty, with Ethan Katz as their pitching coach. In March 2012, his senior year, Giolito sprained the ulnar collateral ligament in his right elbow, sidelining him for the rest of his high school season. Giolito had committed to attend the University of California, Los Angeles (UCLA) and play for the UCLA Bruins baseball team.

== Professional career ==
=== Washington Nationals ===
==== Minor leagues ====
Although some thought he was good enough to be selected with the first overall choice of the 2012 MLB draft, concerns about his elbow caused him to fall to the 16th overall selection, where he was picked by the Washington Nationals.

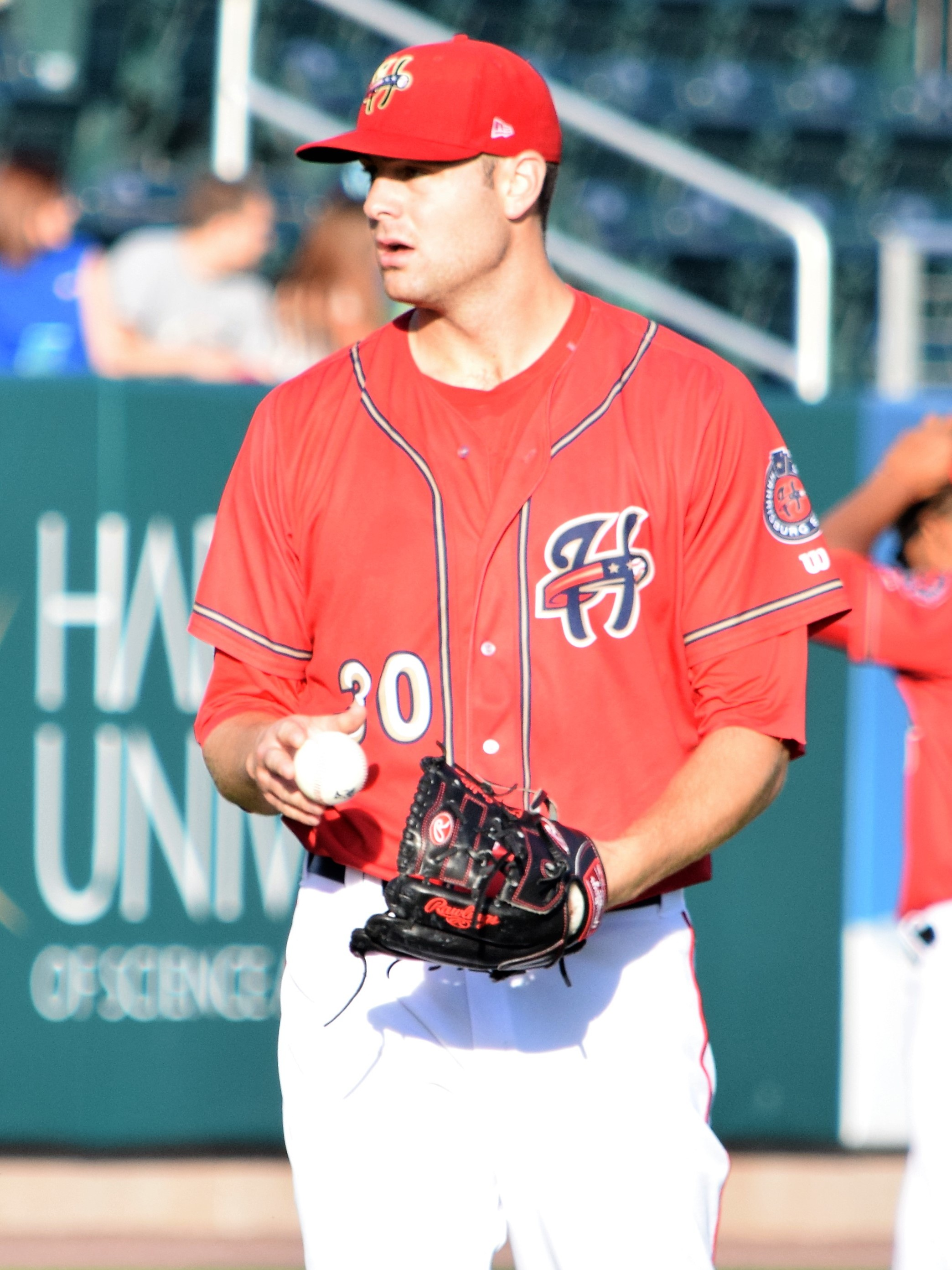
Giolito with the Harrisburg Senators in 2016

Giolito signed with the Nationals on July 13, 2012—thirty seconds before the deadline—to a minor league contract with a $2.925 million signing bonus. By the end of the month, the team had scheduled Tommy John surgery to repair his injured elbow ligament.

By the following summer, he made eight starts for the Gulf Coast Nationals of the rookie-level Gulf Coast League in 2013 and posted a 2.78 earned run average (ERA). He was promoted to the Auburn Doubledays of the Low-A New York–Penn League, and allowed one earned run in the 16 innings he pitched. In 2014, Giolito played his first full season of professional baseball with the Hagerstown Suns of the Single-A South Atlantic League. He went 10–2 with a 2.20 ERA and 110 strikeouts compared to 28 walks over 20 starts. He was selected as the 2014 South Atlantic League Most Valuable Pitcher and Top Minor League Prospect. He also appeared in the All-Star Futures Game.

Giolito began the 2015 season with the Potomac Nationals of the High-A Carolina League, and received a midseason promotion to the Harrisburg Senators of the Double-A Eastern League. The Nationals assigned Giolito to Harrisburg to start the 2016 season. He received a promotion to the Syracuse Chiefs of the Triple-A International League in July.

==== Major leagues ====
On June 28, 2016, the Nationals added Giolito to their active roster and he made his major league debut that night against the New York Mets. In his debut, he pitched four shutout innings, allowing one hit and two walks, while getting one strikeout.

=== Chicago White Sox ===
On December 7, 2016, the Nationals traded Giolito, Reynaldo López, and Dane Dunning to the Chicago White Sox for Adam Eaton. Entering the 2017 season, Giolito was considered the 12th best prospect in all of baseball, according to MLB.com. Giolito began the 2017 season with the Charlotte Knights of the International League. On August 27, 2017, Giolito earned his first MLB victory in a 7–1 White Sox win over the Detroit Tigers. Giolito threw seven scoreless innings yielding only three hits and striking out four Tigers. Giolito finished the season going 3–3 with a 2.38 ERA in 7 starts.

The following season, in 2018, he was part of the starting rotation, making 32 starts for the White Sox, going 10–13 with a 6.13 ERA. In 173 1/3 innings, he struck out 125 but led the American League in walks (90) and earned runs (118), and was 3rd in the league in hit by pitch (15), 4th in wild pitches (13), and 9th in home runs allowed (27). In 2018 he had the highest rate of bases on balls per 9 innings pitched in the majors (4.67), and had the highest WHIP among major league pitchers (1.48). He also had the worst left on base percentage of all qualifying major league pitchers, stranding only 63.5% of base runners.

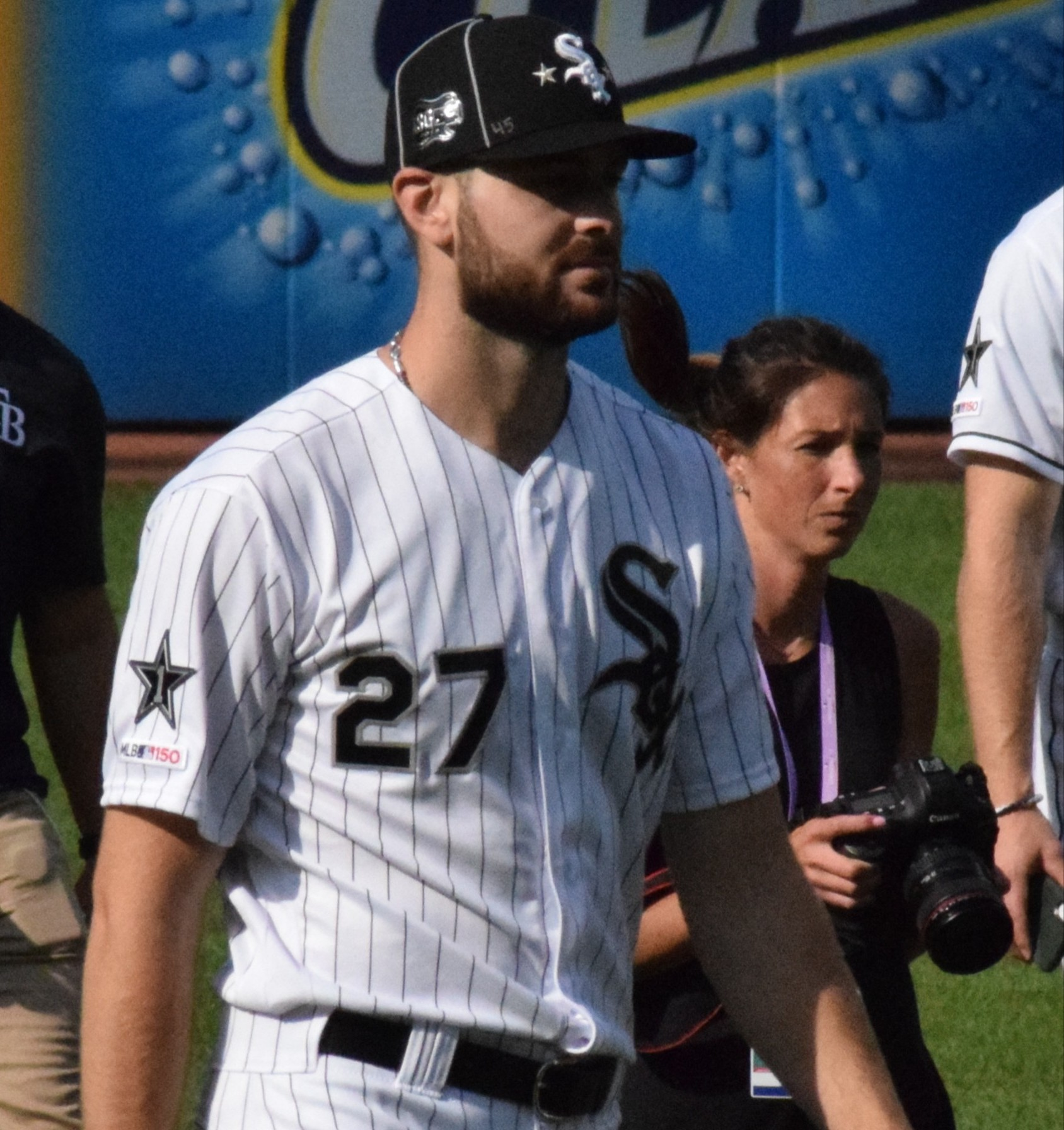
Giolito at the 2019 MLB All-Star Game

In 2019, Giolito's third season and second in the White Sox starting rotation, he greatly improved from the previous year as he went on a nine-game winning streak after starting the year with a 10–1 record. He pitched his first career shutout on May 23 against the Houston Astros. He was also rewarded AL pitcher of the month for the month of May. On June 30, 2019, Giolito was named as one of the American League pitchers for the 2019 MLB All-Star Game, his first All-Star selection. He pitched one scoreless inning in a 4–3 victory for the American League. On September 16, 2019, the White Sox shut down Giolito for the rest of the season due to a mild lat strain in his pitching arm. Giolito finished the season with a 14–9 record, a 3.41 ERA, 228 strikeouts and three complete games over 176 2/3 innings in 29 starts. He also finished 6th in the AL Cy Young Award voting.

On August 25, 2020, Giolito no-hit the Pittsburgh Pirates 4–0 at Guaranteed Rate Field. He struck out 13 batters and threw 74 of 101 pitches for strikes; a fourth-inning walk to Erik González was the only blemish in an otherwise perfect game. The no-hitter was the 19th in White Sox history, the most recent having been Philip Humber's perfect game on April 21, 2012, and the most recent by a White Sox pitcher at Guaranteed Rate Field having been Mark Buehrle's perfect game on July 23, 2009. That season, Giolito went 4–3 in 12 starts with an ERA of 3.48, and struck out 97 in 72 1/3 innings as the White Sox made the playoffs that season. Giolito made his postseason debut against the Oakland Athletics in game 1 of the Wild Card Series. He pitched 7 innings giving up 2 hits, 1 walk, 1 run, and struck out 8. He even retired the first 18 batters he faced in that game. He picked up the win as the White Sox beat the Athletics with a final score of 4–1 but the White Sox went on to lose the Series to the Athletics.

In 2021, Giolito made 31 starts with a record of 11–9 and an ERA of 3.53. He pitched in 178.2 innings and struck out 201 batters. He had the lowest ground ball percentage of all major league pitchers, at 33.2%. In 2022, Giolito had an 11–9 record in 30 starts pitching to an ERA of 4.90 in 161.2 innings giving up 171 hits and 92 runs while he struck out 177 batters.

On January 13, 2023, Giolito signed a one-year, $10.4 million contract with the White Sox, avoiding salary arbitration.

=== Los Angeles Angels ===
On July 26, 2023, Giolito and Reynaldo López were traded to the Los Angeles Angels in exchange for minor league players Ky Bush and Edgar Quero. He made his Angels debut on July 28 against the Toronto Blue Jays. In 5⅓ innings, he allowed three earned runs and struck out five. Giolito was placed on waivers by the Angels on August 29, after posting a 6.89 ERA in 6 starts.

=== Cleveland Guardians ===
On August 31, 2023, Giolito was claimed off waivers by the Cleveland Guardians. He made his first start for the Guardians on September 4, and became the first pitcher to surrender eight earned runs in a game for three different MLB teams in the same season since Bill Magee in 1899. He became a free agent following the season.

=== Boston Red Sox ===
On January 3, 2024, Giolito signed a one-year contract with the Boston Red Sox, with a player option after the first season. In early March, Red Sox manager Alex Cora stated that Giolito would miss the start of the season due to discomfort in his right elbow. It was later announced that Giolito would have surgery and was expected to miss the entire season. An internal brace procedure was performed on March 12, involving repair to his ulnar collateral ligament. Giolito did not play in 2024 and exercised his $19 million option for 2025.

Giolito made 26 starts for the Red Sox in 2025, with a 10–4 record and a 3.41 ERA. He declined his option after the season and became a free agent.

=== San Diego Padres ===
On April 22, 2026, Giolito signed a one-year, major league contract with the San Diego Padres that included a mutual option for the 2027 season. He made seven appearances (including five starts) for San Diego, compiling a 2–3 record and 5.16 ERA with 18 strikeouts across 29 2/3 innings pitched. On June 23, Giolito was placed on the injured list due to right elbow inflammation. He was transferred to the 60–day injured list on August 24. On November 1, the Padres declined their half of a mutual contract option making him a free agent.

== Personal life ==
Giolito is the son of actress Lindsay Frost and actor Rick Giolito. His maternal grandfather, Warren Frost, was an actor, while his paternal grandfather, Silvio Giolito, was a two time Olympic fencer and multiple time US National Champion. Lucas’ brother Casey is an actor, while his uncle, Mark Frost, is a novelist, television screenwriter, and producer best known as the co-creator of Twin Peaks with David Lynch. Another uncle, Scott Frost, is a writer.

In December 2018, Giolito married his high school sweetheart, Ariana Dubelko-Giolito. On July 11, 2023, Giolito announced that the couple had filed for divorce.

Giolito is politically progressive, and has voiced support for the Black Lives Matter movement. In 2026, he backed Democrat Abdul El-Sayed in that year's United States Senate election in Michigan.

Awards and achievements
Preceded by Justin Verlander	No-hitter pitcher August 25, 2020	Succeeded by Alec Mills
