= Pentti Paatsalo =

Finnish swimmer

Personal information
- Born: 21 August 1932 Kemi, Finland
- Died: 28 May 1996 (aged 63) Helsinki, Finland

Sport
- Sport: Swimming

Pentti Paatsalo (21 August 1932 – 28 May 1996) was a Finnish freestyle swimmer. He competed in two events at the 1952 Summer Olympics.
