= Anneli Haaranen =

Finnish swimmer (1934–2020)

Personal information
- Born: 18 February 1934 Helsinki, Finland
- Died: 12 December 2020 (aged 86)

Sport
- Sport: Swimming

Anneli Haaranen (18 February 1934 – 12 December 2020) was a Finnish freestyle and backstroke swimmer. She competed in two events at the 1952 Summer Olympics.
