= Aleksanteri Saarvala =

Finnish artistic gymnast

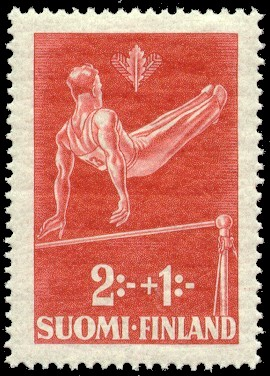
- Saarvala shown on a stamp from 1945

Personal information
- Born: 9 April 1913
- Died: 7 October 1989 (aged 76)

Gymnastics career
- Discipline: Men's artistic gymnastics
- Country represented: Finland
Medal record
Representing Finland
Olympic Games
Gold medal – first place	1936 Berlin	Horizontal bar
Gold medal – first place	1948 London	Team
Bronze medal – third place	1936 Berlin	Team

Aleksanteri Saarvala (9 April 1913 – 7 October 1989) was a Finnish gymnast and Olympic champion. He competed at the 1936 Summer Olympics in Berlin where he received a gold medal in horizontal bar, and a bronze medal in team combined exercises.

== 1948 Olympics ==
Saarvala also participated at the 1948 Summer Olympics in London, where he finished shared 4th in horizontal bar, and 17th all-around. The Finnish team won gold medals, but as he was 7th best Finn he did not receive a medal.
