= Rolf Wiik =

Finnish fencer (1929–2007)

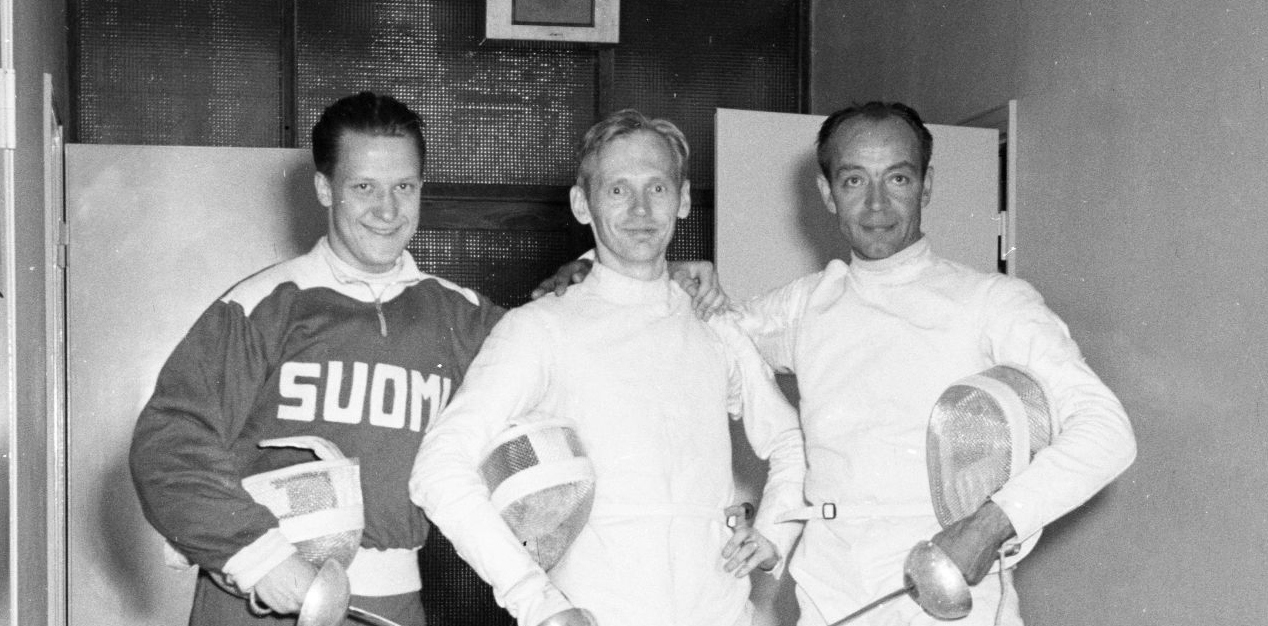
- Rolf Wiik, Kauko Jalkanen and Erkki Kerttula in 1952

Personal information
- Born: 30 January 1929 Tampere, Finland
- Died: 9 August 2007 (aged 78) Helsinki, Finland

Sport
- Sport: Fencing

Rolf Wiik (30 January 1929 – 9 August 2007) was a Finnish épée fencer. He competed at the 1952, 1956 and 1960 Summer Olympics.
