= Alfredo Grisi =

Mexican fencer (1900–1978)

Personal information
- Born: 31 July 1900 Mexico City, Mexico
- Died: 7 July 1978 (aged 77) Coyoacán, Mexico

Sport
- Sport: Fencing

Alfredo Grisi Solórzano (31 July 1900 – 7 July 1978) was a Mexican fencer. He competed in the individual foil event at the 1948 Summer Olympics.
