= Olavi Larkas =

Finnish fencer

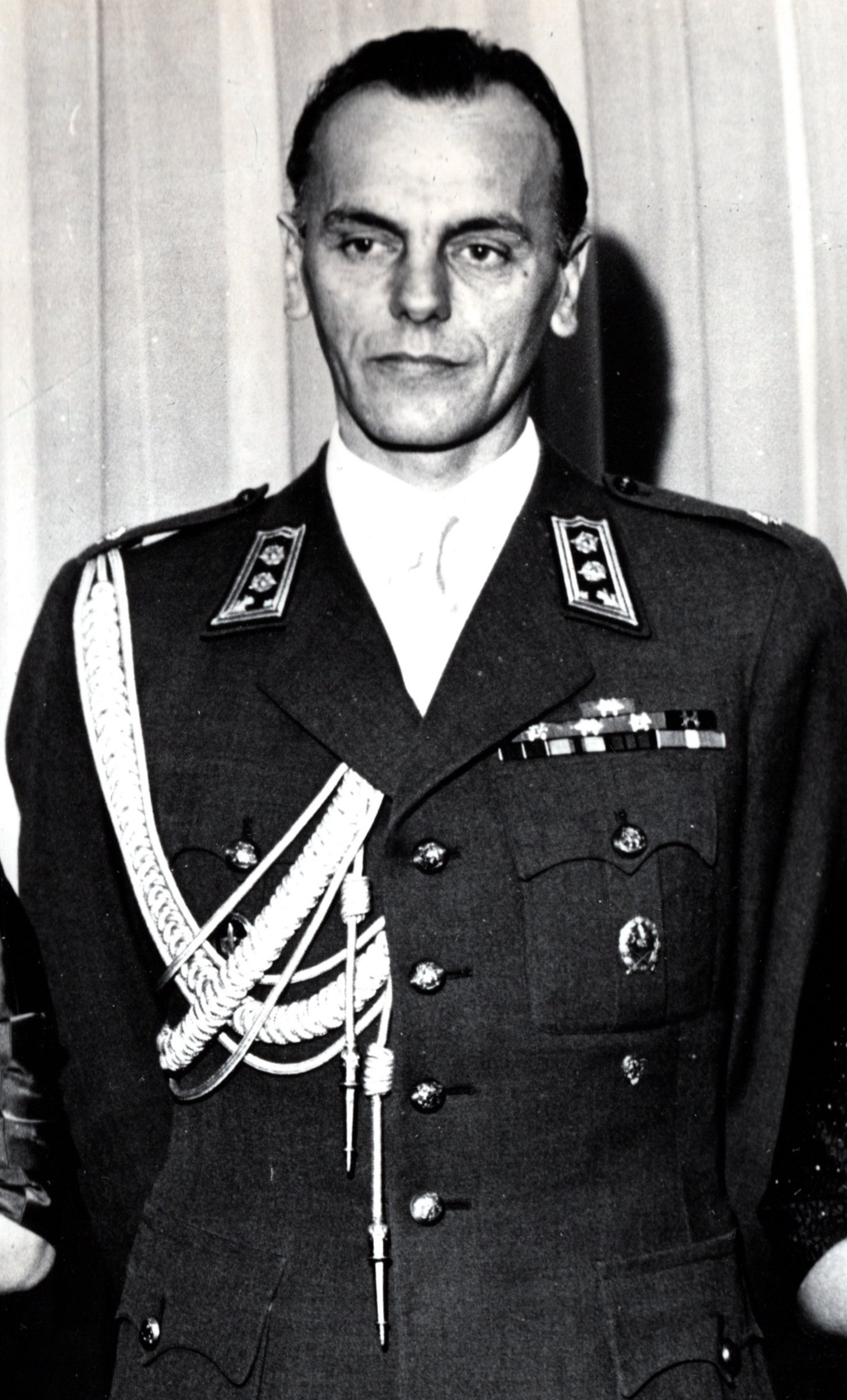
- Larkas in 1961

Personal information
- Born: 30 September 1913 Helsinki, Finland
- Died: 6 May 1984 (aged 70) Vantaa, Finland

Sport
- Sport: Fencing, modern pentathlon

Olavi Larkas (30 September 1913 – 6 May 1984) was a Finnish épée fencer and modern pentathlete. He competed at the 1948 Summer Olympics.
