= Erkki Koskinen =

Finnish cyclist

Personal information
- Born: 5 October 1925 Helsinki, Finland
- Died: 16 July 2009 (aged 83)

Cycling career
- Sport: Cycling

Erkki Koskinen (5 October 1925 – 16 July 2009) was a Finnish cyclist. He competed in three events at the 1948 Summer Olympics.
