= Pentti Ikonen =

Finnish swimmer

Personal information
- Born: 9 May 1934 Viipuri, Finland (now Vyborg, Russia)
- Died: 24 March 2007 (aged 72) Helsinki, Finland

Sport
- Sport: Swimming

Pentti Ikonen (9 May 1934 – 24 March 2007) was a Finnish swimmer. He competed in three events at the 1952 Summer Olympics.
