= Roger Stirn =

Swiss fencer

Personal information
- Born: 6 March 1915 Geneva, Switzerland
- Died: 6 October 1971 (aged 56) Geneva, Switzerland

Sport
- Sport: Fencing

Roger Stirn (6 March 1915 – 6 October 1971) was a Swiss fencer. He competed in the team foil event at the 1948 Summer Olympics.

Outside of fencing, Stirn was an archer and member of the Noble Exercise of the Bow in his native Geneva, holding the title of Chevalier. He died on 6 October 1971 after a long illness, aged 56.
