= Giuliano Nostini =

Italian fencer (1912–1983)

Personal information
- Born: 3 October 1912
- Died: 16 August 1983 (aged 70)

Sport
- Sport: Fencing
Medal record
Men's fencing
Representing Italy
Olympic Games
Silver medal – second place	1948 London	Foil, team

Giuliano Nostini (3 October 1912 – 16 August 1983) was an Italian fencer. He won a silver medal in the team foil event at the 1948 Summer Olympics.
