= Hugo Higueras =

Peruvian fencer (born 1910)

Personal information
- Born: Hermilio Daniel Higueras Ureta; 22 September 1910

Sport
- Sport: Fencing

Hermilio Daniel "Hugo" Higueras Ureta (born 22 September 1910, date of death unknown) was a Peruvian fencer. He competed in the individual foil event at the 1948 Summer Olympics.
