= Henry Shakespear Thuillier =

Lieutenant-Colonel Henry Shakespear Thuillier DSO (10 September 1895 – 1982) was a British Army officer.

== Early life and family ==
Thuillier was born at Murree, Punjab, India, the son of Major General Sir Henry Fleetwood Thuillier and Helen Thuillier (died 1923), eldest daughter of Major-General G.R. Shakespear of the Indian Army.

== Death ==
Thuillier died in Victoria, BC, Canada in 1982.

== Selected publications ==
- Cosmos Without End. Vantage Press, 1975.
- That which was. H.S. Thuillier, Victoria, B.C., 1977.
