= Paul Valcke =

Belgian fencer

Personal information
- Born: 11 January 1914 Ostend, Belgium
- Died: 15 July 1980 (aged 66)

Sport
- Sport: Fencing
Medal record
Men's fencing
Representing Belgium
Olympic Games
Bronze medal – third place	1948 London	Foil, team

Paul Valcke (11 January 1914 – 15 July 1980) was a Belgian fencer. He won a bronze medal in the team foil event at the 1948 Summer Olympics.
