= Torvald Högström =

Finnish cyclist

Personal information
- Full name: Torvald Högström
- Born: 16 February 1926 Porvoo, Finland
- Died: 28 May 2010 (aged 84)

Cycling career
- Sport: Cycling
- Role: Rider

Torvald Högström (16 February 1926 – 28 May 2010) was a Finnish racing cyclist. He won the Finnish national road race title in 1951. He competed in three events at the 1948 Summer Olympics.
