= Henri Paternóster =

Belgian fencer

Personal information
- Born: 9 January 1908 Etterbeek, Belgium
- Died: 30 September 2007 (aged 99)

Sport
- Sport: Fencing
Medal record
Men's fencing
Representing Belgium
Olympic Games
Bronze medal – third place	1948 London	Foil, team

Henri Paternóster (9 January 1908 – 30 September 2007) was a Belgian Olympic fencer. He won a bronze medal in the team foil event at the 1948 Summer Olympics.
