= Mauno Valkeinen =

Finnish swimmer

Personal information
- Full name: Mauno Kalervo Valkeinen
- Nationality: Finnish
- Born: 12 January 1930 Jämsä, Finland
- Died: 25 February 2015 (aged 85) Helsinki, Finland

Sport
- Sport: Swimming
- Strokes: freestyle

Mauno Valkeinen (12 January 1930 – 25 February 2015) was a Finnish freestyle swimmer. He competed in two events at the 1952 Summer Olympics.
