= Leo Telivuo =

Finnish swimmer

Personal information
- Born: 14 November 1929 Helsinki, Finland
- Died: 8 February 1970 (aged 40) Helsinki, Finland

Sport
- Sport: Swimming

Leo Telivuo (14 November 1929 – 8 February 1970) was a Finnish swimmer. He competed in two events at the 1952 Summer Olympics.
