= Ramón Abella =

Uruguayan water polo player (1922–1989)

Personal information
- Born: 16 February 1922 Montevideo, Uruguay
- Died: 12 December 1989 (aged 67)

Sport
- Sport: Water polo

Ramón Neptuno Abella Caside (16 February 1922 – 12 December 1989) was a Uruguayan water polo player. He competed in the 1948 Summer Olympics.
