= Ritva Koivula =

Finnish swimmer (1933–2025)

Personal information
- Born: 18 January 1933 Viipuri, Finland (now Vyborg, Russia)
- Died: 23 September 2025 (aged 92)

Sport
- Sport: Swimming

Ritva Koivula (18 January 1933 – 23 September 2025) was a Finnish freestyle swimmer. She competed in two events at the 1952 Summer Olympics. Koivula died on 23 September 2025, at the age of 92.
