= Dorothy Dermody =

Irish fencer

Personal information
- Nickname: Tommy
- Born: 26 April 1909 Ballyhasty, Cloughjordan, County Tipperary, Ireland
- Died: 10 April 2012 (aged 102) Killiney, County Dublin, Ireland
- Spouse: Count Cyril McCormack

Sport
- Sport: Fencing

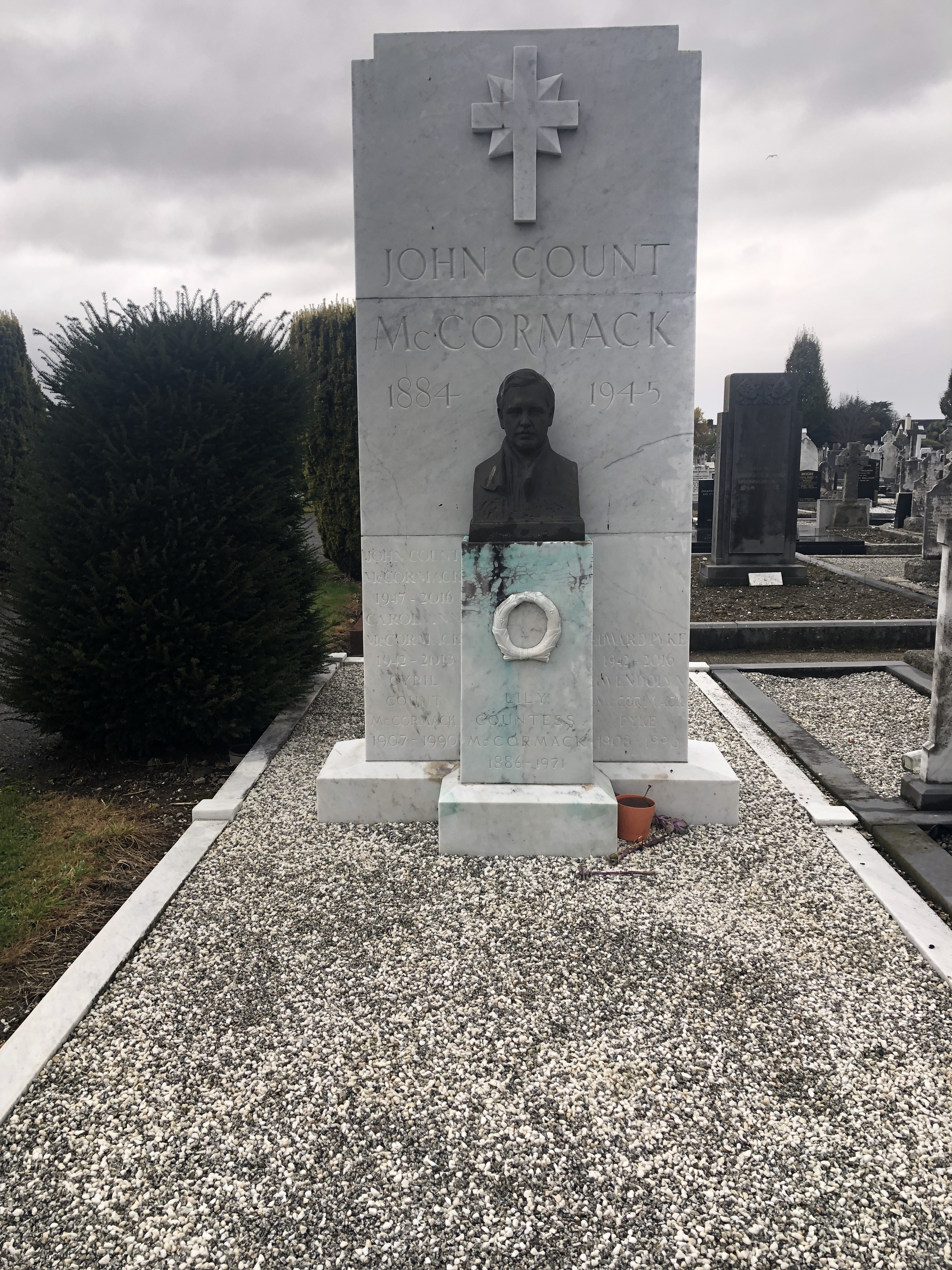
Grave of Dermody's husband, Cyril Count McCormack, is buried at Deansgrange cemetery, along with tenor signer Count John McCormack.

Dorothy "Tommy" Dermody (26 April 1909 – 10 April 2012) was an Irish fencer from County Tipperary. She competed in the women's individual foil event at the 1948 Summer Olympics. When she died she was, at age 102, Ireland's oldest living Olympian and the oldest living Olympic fencer in the world.

== Family life ==
Dorothy Dermody was born on 26 April 1909, the daughter of William Dermody and Julia Rose Elizabeth Edith Mary (Evens) Dermody.

She was the sister of George William Victor Dermody (born 22 January 1901 in County Tipperary) and Ronald Desmond Dermody (born 18 May 1905 in Kilmullen, County Laois). Her father, William, was born in about 1865 in Ireland and was a ship's captain. He married Julia on 5 January 1900 in County Tipperary. Julia was born in about 1877 in England to timber merchant George Evans and his wife Emma. She was known by her middle name Edith. The family were Protestant. They moved to County Tipperary circa 1889 and settled in Garraunorish. They lived in Ballyhasty, though William was frequently away on voyages, with Julia occasionally joining him. In 1901, she was staying at her parents' home with her son George.

Dermody's husband, Cyril Patrick McCormack was born on 27 March 1907 in 27 Mountjoy Square, Dublin, Ireland. He was the son of John McCormack and Elizabeth Foley. He died in 1990 in County Dublin.

== Early life ==
Dermody spent most of her early life travelling with her father on board his ship. However, due to rules the ship was only allowed 1 female passenger which was taken by Dorothy's mother. This is how she adopted the nickname "Tommy" which stuck with her for most her life.

Dermody and her family were well off and lived a big house, her family also owned a stable and kept horses. Dorothy would spend most of her time with the horses and developed a love for horse riding in her youth.

Dermody attended the now defunct Ling College in Dublin, Where she studied Physical education and excelled in sports like fencing and diving but also participated in other sports. Dorothy was also a mistress at Dublin's fee-paying girls school, Alexandra College.

== Career ==
Dermody played lacrosse and squash at national level, but was seen to be better at diving and fencing. She won national titles in both lacrosse and squash. Dermody was offered to compete in the Olympics as a diver but instead requested to take part in the fencing competition in the 1948 Summer Olympics, the first Olympics that had taken place in 12 years due to World War II. Dermody competed on 31 July 1948.

Dermody was one of only five Irish women to compete in the 1948 Olympics. Dermody was knocked out in the first round, coming last and seventh in her group.

== Later life and death ==
Dermody was a secretary of the Dublin Wine Society in her later years, after her career as a physical education teacher came to an end in 1958. In 1990 Dermody became better known as "Tommy McCormack".

Dermody was involved in many projects to get more children involved in sport and be more active across Ireland. She once led a campaign to have a playground put in to every school in Ireland. She hosted a children's radio show programme that talked about sports, in particular she hosted on-air swimming lessons on RTÉ with Seamus Kavanagh. Dermody received the Centurion Bounty award for reaching 100 years of age from the President of Ireland. Dermody was invited to a lunch to be celebrated for her participation in the 1948 Summer Olympics. At this lunch she was awarded an Olympic medal of honour, she sent her family to receive this award on her behalf as she was unable to attend.

Dermody died at the age of 102 on 10 April 2012 at Killiney Grove Nursing Home. She was cremated and interred at Deansgrange cemetery at St. Patrick's Plot. When she died she was Ireland's oldest living Olympian and the oldest living Olympian fencer in the world.

== Legacy ==
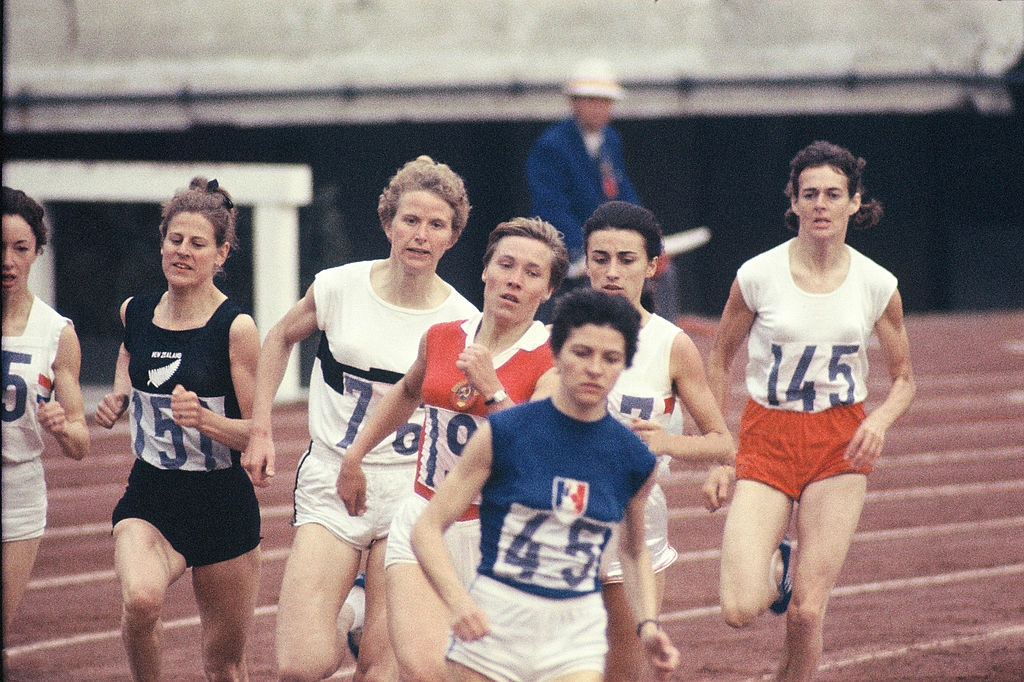
1964 Summer Olympics 800 meter race. Maeve Kyle competed in this event, reaching the semi-final.

Dorothy Dermody was the first female Olympic athlete for Ireland and as such her participation in the Olympics has inspired other women to follow. During her time teaching in Alexandra College she taught P.E to future Olympian Maeve Kyle who would go on to become Ireland's first female track and field athlete to compete in the Olympics. Kyle was able to argue her attendance of the games by bringing up Dermody's attendance of the 1948 Olympics as an example of a female attending the games. She competed in the 1956 Summer Olympics in Australia, the 1960 Summer Olympics in Italy and the 1964 Summer Olympics in Japan. Additionally Kyle competed in European Athletic Championships and won a bronze medal in the 1966 European Indoor Athletics Championship for the 400 meter race.

When Dermody died at the age of 102, she left a son John McCormack and two daughters Sylvia McCormack and Carol Ann McCormack. Carol Ann McCormack died one year later in 2013, and was buried in the same cemetery.
