= Manuel Torrente =

Argentine fencer (1908–1948)

Personal information
- Born: 7 June 1908 Rosario, Argentina
- Died: 4 September 1948 (aged 40) São Vicente, Cape Verde

Sport
- Sport: Fencing

Manuel Torrente (7 June 1908 – 4 September 1948) was an Argentine fencer. He competed at the 1936 and 1948 Summer Olympics. Torrente died in São Vicente, Cape Verde on 4 September 1948, at the age of 40.
