= Arthur Smith (fencer) =

British fencer

Personal information
- Nationality: British
- Born: 4 February 1915 Lahore, India

Sport
- Sport: Fencing
- Club: London FC

Achievements and titles
- Olympic finals: 1948 Summer Olympics

Arthur Radford Smith (born 4 February 1915, date of death unknown) was a British fencer. He competed in the individual and team foil events at the 1948 Summer Olympics. In 1948, he won the foil title at the British Fencing Championships.
