= Corrado Schlaepfer =

Swiss fencer

Personal information
- Born: 27 November 1922
- Died: 1 April 1980 (aged 57)

Sport
- Sport: Fencing

Corrado Schlaepfer (27 November 1922 – 1 April 1980) was a Swiss fencer. He competed in the individual and team foil events at the 1948 Summer Olympics.
