= Walo Hörning =

Swiss fencer

Personal information
- Born: 7 September 1910
- Died: 18 January 1986 (aged 75)

Sport
- Sport: Fencing

Walter "Walo" Hörning (7 September 1910 – 18 January 1986) was a Swiss fencer. He competed in the individual and team foil events at the 1948 Summer Olympics.
