= Ivan Ruben =

Danish fencer (1917–1986)

Personal information
- Born: 12 August 1917 Copenhagen, Denmark
- Died: 2 February 1986 (aged 68) Gentofte, Denmark

Sport
- Sport: Fencing

Ivan Ruben (12 August 1917 – 2 February 1986) was a Danish fencer. He competed at the 1948 and 1952 Summer Olympics held in London and Helsinki respectively.
