= Henny ter Weer =

Dutch fencer (1922–2013)

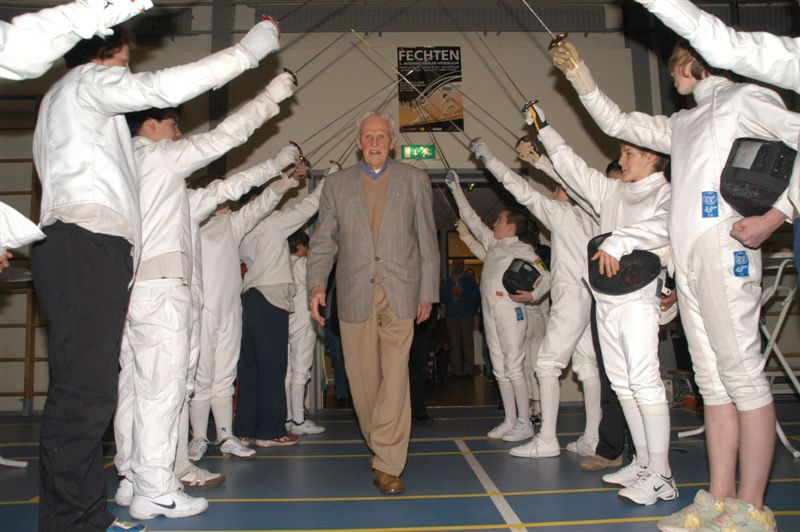

Personal information
- Born: 7 August 1922 Leiden, Netherlands
- Died: 12 August 2013 (aged 91) The Hague, Netherlands

Sport
- Sport: Fencing

Henny ter Weer (7 August 1922 – 12 August 2013) was a Dutch fencer. He competed in the individual and team foil and the team sabre events at the 1948 Summer Olympics.
