= André van de Werve de Vorsselaer =

Belgian fencer (1908–1984)

Personal information
- Born: 10 April 1908 Antwerp, Belgium
- Died: 6 October 1984 (aged 76) Antwerp, Belgium

Sport
- Sport: Fencing
Medal record
Men's fencing
Representing Belgium
Olympic Games
Bronze medal – third place	1948 London	Foil, team

André van de Werve de Vorsselaer (10 April 1908 – 6 October 1984) was a Belgian fencer. He won a bronze medal in the team foil event at the 1948 Summer Olympics.
