= Henry Ravenshaw Thuillier =

Colonel Sir Henry Ravenshaw Thuillier, KCIE (1838–1922) was a British Army officer and the Surveyor General of India from 1887 to 1895.

Thuillier was the son of Henry Edward Landor Thuillier, also Surveyor General of India. His mother was Susanne Elizabeth Thuillier, daughter of the reverend Haydon Cardew of Curry Mallet, Somerset.

Thuillier joined the Royal Engineers, and spent most of his career in India. He was Surveyor General of India from 1887 to 1895, and was created a Knight Commander of the Order of the Indian Empire (KCIE) for 1894.

Thuillier married, in 1867, Emmeline Williams, daughter of Fleetwood Williams. His son was Major General Sir Henry Fleetwood Thuillier.

== Selected publications ==
- Report on the explorations of Lama Serapa Gyatsho 1856– 68, explorer K.P. 1880-84, Lama U.G. 1883, explorer R.N. 1885–86, explorer P.A. 1885–86, in Sikkim, Bhutan, and Tibet. 1889
