= Sergio Iesi =

Uruguayan fencer

Personal information
- Full name: Sergio Iesi Tedesco
- Born: 8 April 1912 Portogruaro, Kingdom of Italy
- Died: 6 February 1986 (aged 73) Rome, Italy

Sport
- Sport: Fencing

Sergio Iesi (8 April 1912 – 6 February 1986) was a Uruguayan foil fencer. He competed at the 1948 and 1952 Summer Olympics.
