= Daniel Rossi (fencer) =

Uruguayan fencer (1920–1992)

Personal information
- Full name: Daniel Rossi Stajano
- Born: 29 August 1920 Montevideo, Uruguay
- Died: 21 January 1992 (aged 71) Montevideo, Uruguay

Sport
- Sport: Fencing

Daniel Rossi Stajano (29 August 1920 – 21 January 1992) was a Uruguayan fencer. He competed in the individual and team foil events at the 1948 Summer Olympics. Rossi died in Montevideo on 21 January 1992, at the age of 71.
