= Henry Edward Landor Thuillier =

British colonial civil servant (1813-1906)

Sir Henry Edward Landor Thuillier CSI FRS
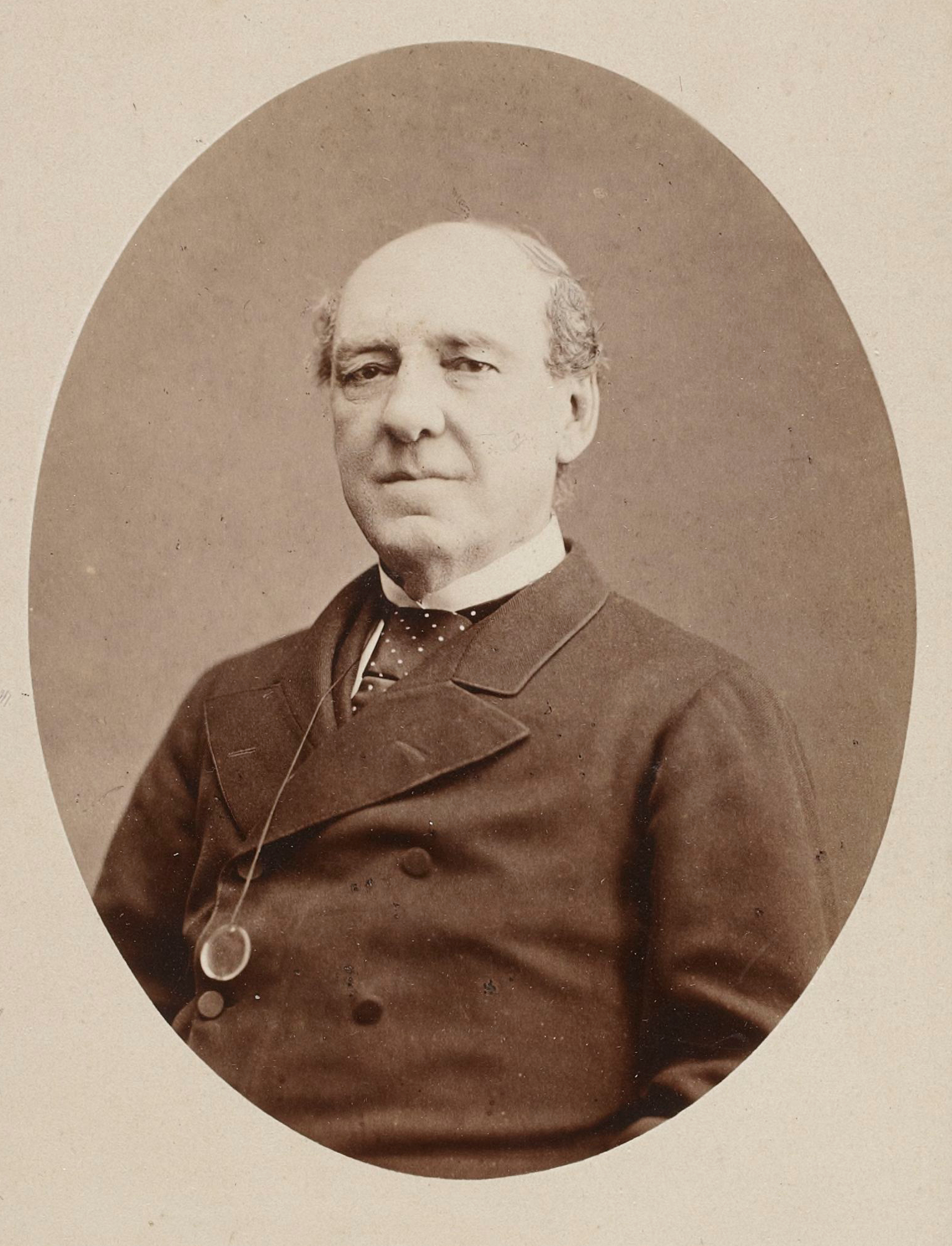
- Henry Edward Landor Thuillier
- Born: 10 July 1813; Bath, Somerset, England
- Died: 6 May 1906 (aged 92); Richmond, London, England
- Resting place: Richmond Cemetery, England
- Education: Addiscombe Military Seminary, Surrey, England
- Spouses: Susanne Elizabeth Cardew (m. 1836; died 1844) Annie Charlotte Macpherson (m. 1847)
- Children: 10
- Father: John Pierre Thuillier
- Relatives: Col Sir Henry Ravenshaw Thuillier (son)

Sir Henry Edward Landor Thuillier CSI FRS (10 July 1813 – 6 May 1906) was Surveyor General of India. Under his direction, 796,928 square miles of India were surveyed, including difficult mountainous, forest, and desert regions, often for the first time. He was responsible for the printing in 1854 of the first postage stamps valid throughout India. Thuillier was elected a fellow of the Royal Society in 1869, made a CSI in May 1870, and knighted in June 1879.

== Early life ==
Thuillier was born at Bath on 10 July 1813, was youngest of eleven children (five sons and six daughters) of John Pierre Thuillier, Baron of Malapert, and merchant of Cadiz and Bath, by his wife Julia, daughter of James Burrow of Exeter. An elder sister, Julia, married Walter Savage Landor in 1811. He was descended from Huguenots who, on the revocation of the Edict of Nantes in 1685, first settled in Geneva. He was educated at the East India Company's military academy, Addiscombe.

== Marriage ==
Thuillier married firstly in 1836 Susanne Elizabeth (died 1844), daughter of the reverend Haydon Cardew of Curry Mallet, Somerset, by whom he had a son (Colonel Sir Henry Ravenshaw Thuillier, KCIE, also Indian surveyor-general, 1887–95), and a daughter; and secondly in 1847 Annie Charlotte, daughter of George Gordon Macpherson, Bengal medical service, by whom he had six sons (three of them became officers in the Indian army) and two daughters.

== Career ==
Thuillier was gazetted to the Bengal artillery on 14 December 1832 and was stationed at the headquarters, Dum Dum. Transferred to the survey department in December 1836, he first served with parties in Ganjam and Orissa, and later was in charge of the revenue surveys in the Bengal districts of Cachar, Sylhet, Cuttack, and Patna. In January 1847, ten months before receiving his captaincy, he was appointed deputy surveyor-general and superintendent of revenue surveys. That post he held for seventeen years, in the course of which he much improved the survey system and rendered the results more readily accessible to the public. He "followed in the track of the different trigonometrical series, and thus had the advantage of fixed stations on which to base his detailed surveys". He was joint author with Captain R. Smythe of The Manual of Surveying in India (Calcutta, 1851; 3rd edit. 1885). There he discussed the difficult question of Indian orthography, which was officially standardised while he had charge of the department.

He was president of The Asiatic Society of Bengal in 1863.

Succeeding Sir Andrew Scott Waugh as surveyor-general on 13 March 1861, he was promoted lieutenant-colonel in the same year, colonel on 20 September 1865, and major-general on 26 March 1870. The survey of the more settled parts of India had been completed, and many of the surveys under Thuillier were over mountainous and forest-clad regions or sandy deserts, and frequently in parts never before visited by Europeans. In every branch, he showed organising and administrative talent. In 1868 he transferred the preparation of the Atlas of India from England to Calcutta, selecting a staff of engravers there for the purpose, and encouraging John Bobanau Nicklerlieu Hennessey to introduce the photo-zincographic process. Under Thuillier's superintendence 796,928 square miles, or more than half the dependency, were dealt with. He was elected a fellow of the Royal Society in 1869, made a C.S.I., in May 1870, and knighted on 26 June 1879. In July 1876 he was awarded a good service pension.

== First stamps of India ==
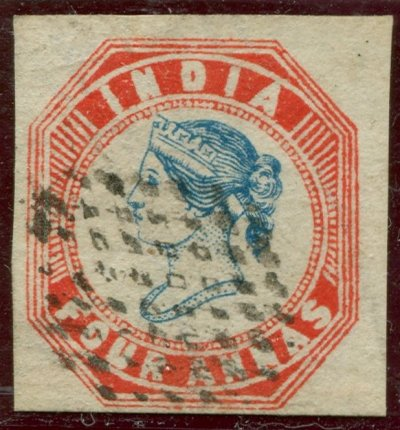
A four annas stamp of 1854 from the first issue of India.

In 1854, while a captain at the Lithographic Office of the survey department, he was responsible for the printing of the first postage stamps for the whole of India, the first stamps issued in India being the Scinde Dawk stamps issued for use in the Province of Scinde (now in Pakistan) in 1852. The stamps produced by Thuillier were only printed in India when the Court of Directors of the East India Company would not authorise the printing of the stamps in England despite several unsuccessful attempts by different people in India to produce a stamp that could be reliably printed in quantity.

== Retirement ==
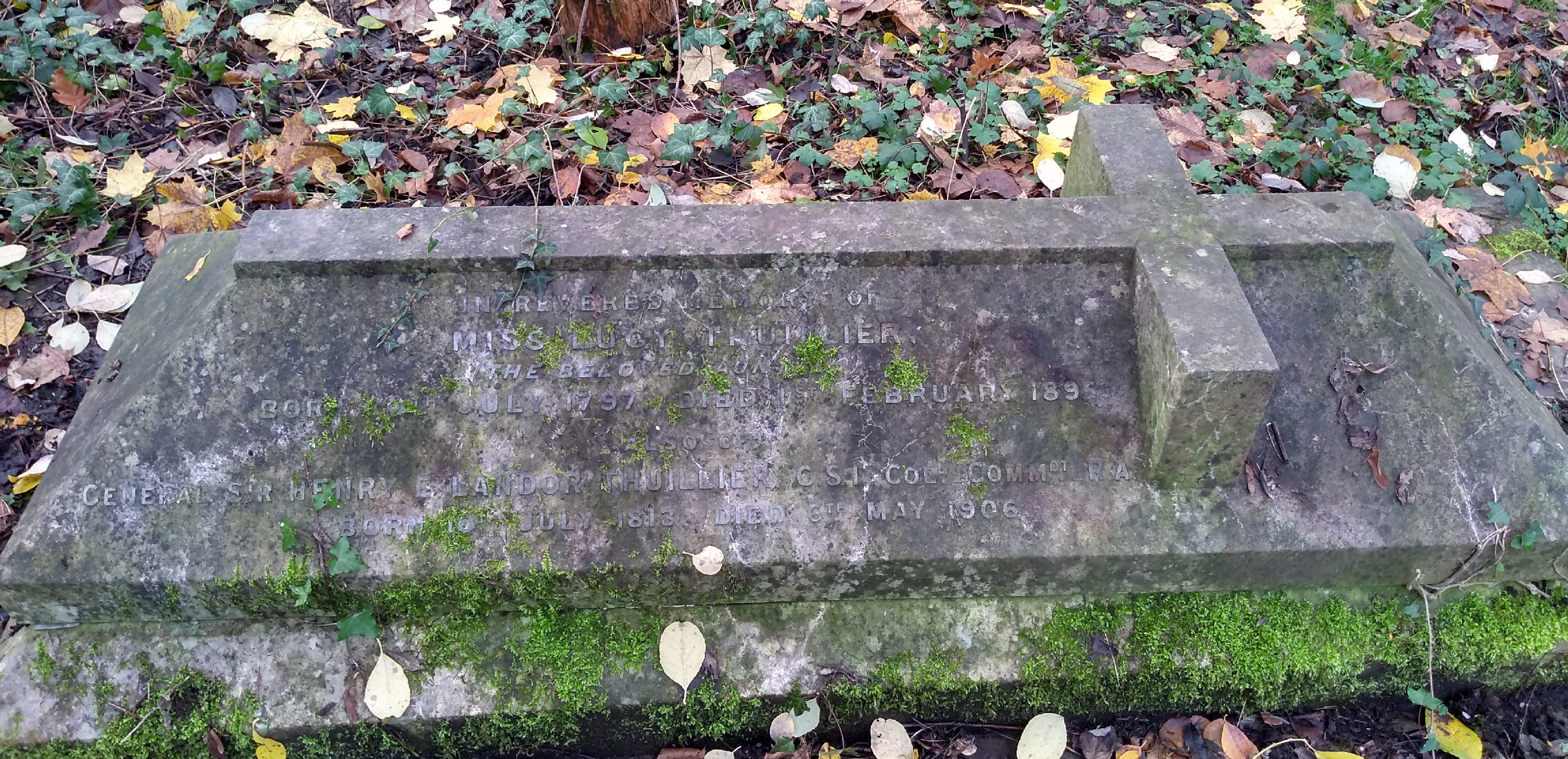
Richmond Old Cemetery

Thuillier retired on 1 January 1878, and the secretary of state, in a despatch dated 18 July 1878, highly commended the energy and perseverance of his forty-one years' service, and congratulated him on the results. He was gazetted lieutenant-general on 10 July 1879, general on 1 July 1881, and (a rare distinction for an officer with little actual military service) colonel commandant of the Royal Artillery on 1 January 1883. Settling at Richmond, he was long a useful member of the Royal Geographical Society's council and came to be looked upon as the father of the East India Company's service. Of fine presence and genial temper, he retained his faculties till his death on 6 May 1906 at Richmond, where he was buried in Richmond Old Cemetery.

== Portraits ==
There are three portraits in oils: (1) by Mr. Beetham (1846), formerly owned by Sir Henry Thuillier; (2) by Mr. G. G. Palmer (1885), formerly in the surveyor-general's office, Calcutta; and (3) by Mrs. Rowley (1896), presented by her to his eldest daughter, Mrs. Westmorland.

== Selected publications ==
- The Manual of Surveying in India. Calcutta, 1851; 3rd edit. 1885. (With Captain R. Smythe)
