= Jaime Ucar =

Uruguayan fencer (1915–1973)

Personal information
- Born: Jaime Roberto Ucar Ferreiro; 24 September 1915 Montevideo, Uruguay
- Died: 14 January 1973 (aged 57) Montevideo, Uruguay

Sport
- Sport: Fencing

Jaime Roberto Ucar Ferreiro (24 September 1915 – 14 January 1973) was a Uruguayan fencer. He competed in the individual and team foil events at the 1948 Summer Olympics. Ucar died in Montevideo on 14 January 1973, at the age of 57.
