= Nick Thuillier =

Irish fencer

Personal information
- Born: 5 May 1907
- Died: 25 June 1983 (aged 76)

Sport
- Sport: Fencing

Nick Thuillier (5 May 1907 – 25 June 1983) was an Irish fencer. He competed in the individual and team foil events at the 1948 Summer Olympics.
