= Erkki Kerttula =

Finnish fencer

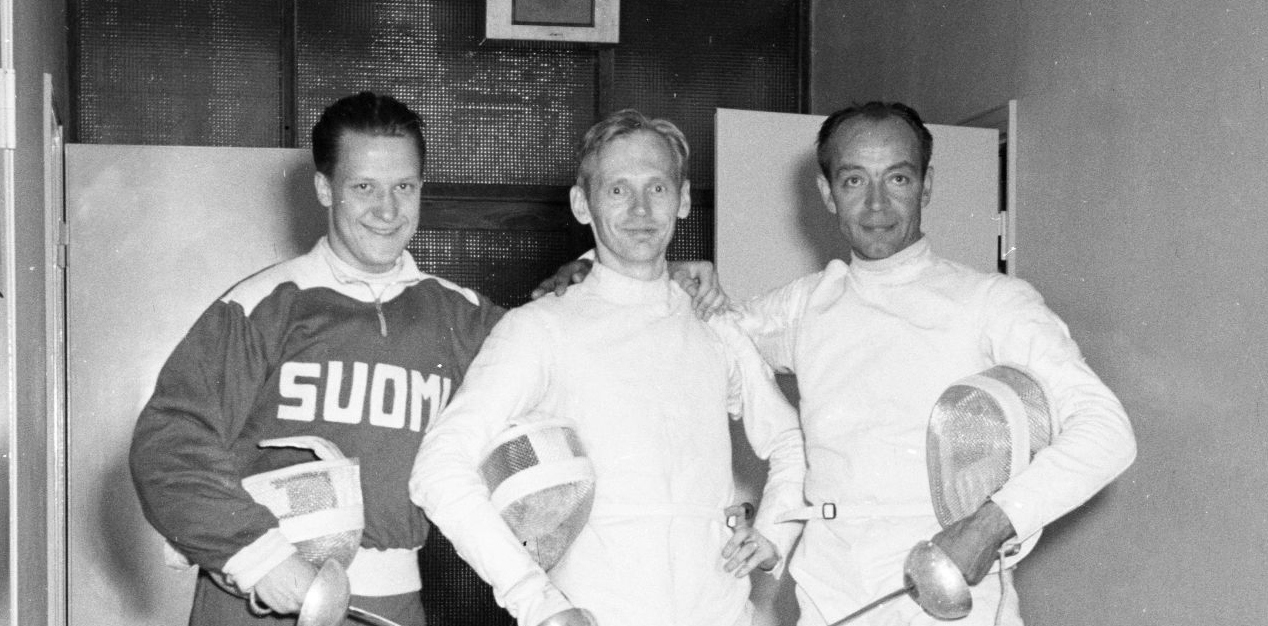
- Rolf Wiik, Kauko Jalkanen and Erkki Kerttula in 1952

Personal information
- Born: 5 November 1909 Oulu, Finland
- Died: 4 November 1989 (aged 79) Oulu, Finland

Sport
- Sport: Fencing

Erkki Kerttula (5 November 1909 – 4 November 1989) was a Finnish fencer. He competed at the 1948 and 1952 Summer Olympics.

Kerttula and Rolf Wiik were considered Finland's two best Olympic fencers; Kerttula was noted in an article in Yle as having said that "he would have easily won the gold [at the 1952 Olympics]. However, he had gone to take a nap before the last matches, and he was remembered to be woken up only a few minutes before the start of the matches."
