= Henry Fleetwood Thuillier =

British Army general

Major-General Sir Henry Fleetwood Thuillier KCB CMG
- Portrait by Walter Stoneman, 1919
- Born: 30 March 1868; Meerut, Uttar Pradesh
- Died: 11 June 1953 (aged 85)
- Military career
- Allegiance: United Kingdom
- Branch: British Indian Army
- Service years: 1887–1920
- Rank: Major-General
- Service number: 17626
- Unit: Royal Engineers
- Commands: 52nd (Lowland) Infantry Division; School of Military Engineering; 23rd Division; 15th Division; 2nd Infantry Brigade
- Conflicts: First World War
- Awards: Knight Commander of the Order of the Bath; Companion of the Order of St Michael and St George

Major-General Sir Henry Fleetwood Thuillier, KCB, CMG (30 March 1868 – 11 June 1953) was a British Army officer who played a significant part in the development of gas warfare.

== Early life ==
Thuillier was born at Meerut, Uttar Pradesh, India, on 30 March 1868, the son of Colonel Sir Henry Ravenshaw Thuillier.

== Military career ==
Thuillier was commissioned into the Royal Engineers on 23 July 1890. His early career was spent in India.

He became commander of 2nd Infantry Brigade in October 1915, General Officer Commanding 15th (Scottish) Division in June 1917, after receiving a temporary promotion to major general, and General Officer Commanding 23rd Division in Italy in 1918, during the First World War.

After the war Thuillier, promoted in June 1919 to substantive major general, became Commandant of the School of Military Engineering in November 1919, Director of Fortifications and Works at the War Office in 1924, and GOC of the 52nd (Lowland) Infantry Division, a Territorial Territorial Army (TA) formation, on 21 June 1927, taking over from Major General Hamilton Reed.

He retired from the army in March 1930.

He died at the age of 85 on 11 June 1953.

== Selected publications ==
- The Principles of Land Defence and Their Application to the Conditions of To-Day. 1902.
- Gas in the next war. Geoffrey Bles, London, 1939. (German translation published in Zürich by Scientia, 1939, as Das gas im nächsten krieg. Introduction and notes by V. Tempelhoff).

== See also ==
- Leslie de Malapert Thuillier

Military offices
New command	Commandant of the School of Military Engineering; 1919–1923	Succeeded by Philip Grant
Preceded by Hamilton Reed	GOC 52nd (Lowland) Infantry Division; 1927–1930	Succeeded by Sir Walter Constable-Maxwell-Scott
