= Owen Tuohy =

Irish fencer

Personal information
- Born: 25 October 1921 Dublin, Ireland
- Died: 8 July 2007 (aged 85)

Sport
- Sport: Fencing

Owen Tuohy (25 October 1921 – 8 July 2007) was an Irish fencer. He competed in the individual and team foil events at the 1948 Summer Olympics.
