= Silvio Giolito =

American fencer (1918–2006)

Personal information
- Born: Silvio Louis Giolito; September 27, 1918 New York City, U.S.
- Died: September 30, 2006 (aged 88) Norcross, Georgia, U.S.

Sport
- Sport: Fencing

Silvio Louis Giolito (September 27, 1918 – September 30, 2006) was an American foil fencer. He competed at the 1948 and 1952 Summer Olympics.
