= Kauko Jalkanen =

Finnish fencer

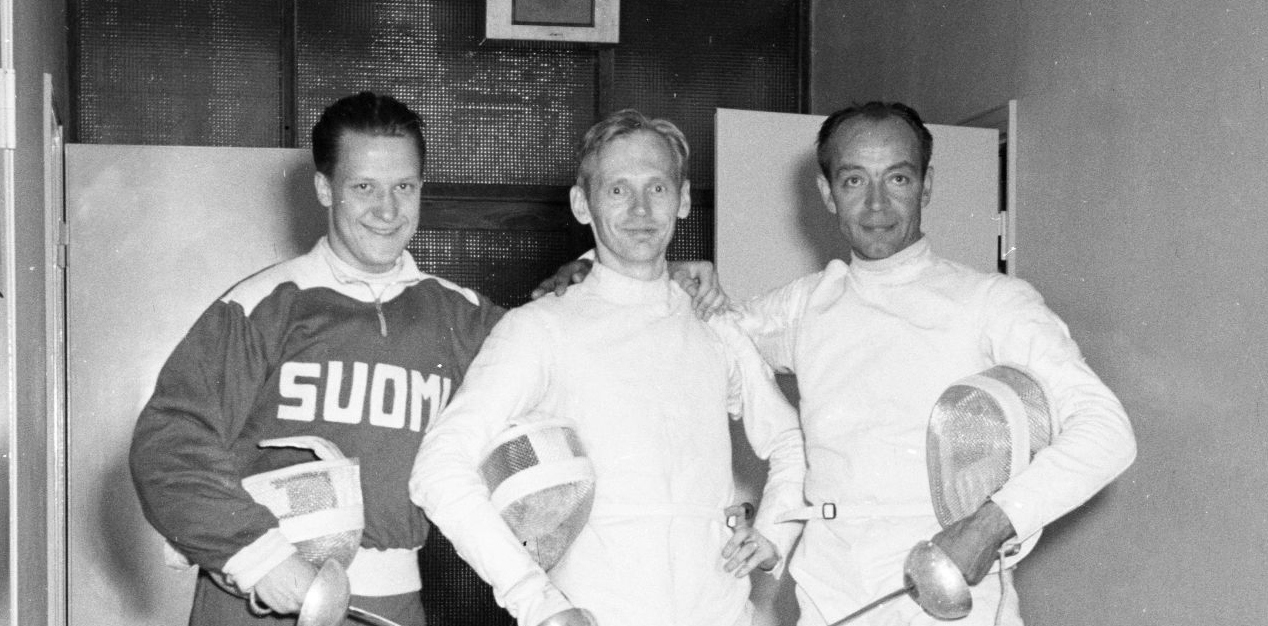
- Rolf Wiik, Kauko Jalkanen and Erkki Kerttula in 1952

Personal information
- Born: 8 December 1918 Heinola, Finland
- Died: 3 September 2007 (aged 88)

Sport
- Sport: Fencing

Kauko Jalkanen (8 December 1918 – 3 September 2007) was a Finnish épée, foil and sabre fencer. He competed at the 1948 and 1952 Summer Olympics.
