= Heikki Raitio =

Finnish fencer

Personal information
- Born: 29 July 1924 Helsinki, Finland
- Died: 12 February 1997 (aged 72) Helsinki, Finland

Sport
- Sport: Fencing

Heikki Raitio (29 July 1924 – 12 February 1997) was a Finnish épée and foil fencer. He competed at the 1948 and 1952 Summer Olympics.
