= Tom Smith (fencer) =

Irish fencer (1923–1995)

Personal information
- Born: 23 February 1923
- Died: 23 February 1995 (aged 72)

Sport
- Sport: Fencing

Tom Smith (23 February 1923 – 23 February 1995) was an Irish fencer. He competed in the individual and team foil events at the 1948 Summer Olympics. He died on 23 February 1995, on his 72th birthday.
