= Harry Thuillier =

Irish fencer (1922–2011)

Personal information
- Nationality: Irish
- Born: 13 September 1922 Dublin, Irish Free State
- Died: 26 April 2011 (aged 85) Dublin, Ireland

Sport
- Sport: Fencing; Table tennis

Harry Thuillier (13 September 1922 – 26 April 2011) was an Irish fencer, table tennis international and broadcaster. He was educated at St. Vincent's C.B.S., Glasnevin. He competed in the individual foil events at the 1952 and 1960 Summer Olympics.

He also represented Ireland at table tennis and was part of the Irish team that competed in the 1947 World Table Tennis Championships.
