= Cycling at the 1948 Summer Olympics – Men's individual road race =

Men's cycling road race at the Games of the XIV Olympiad
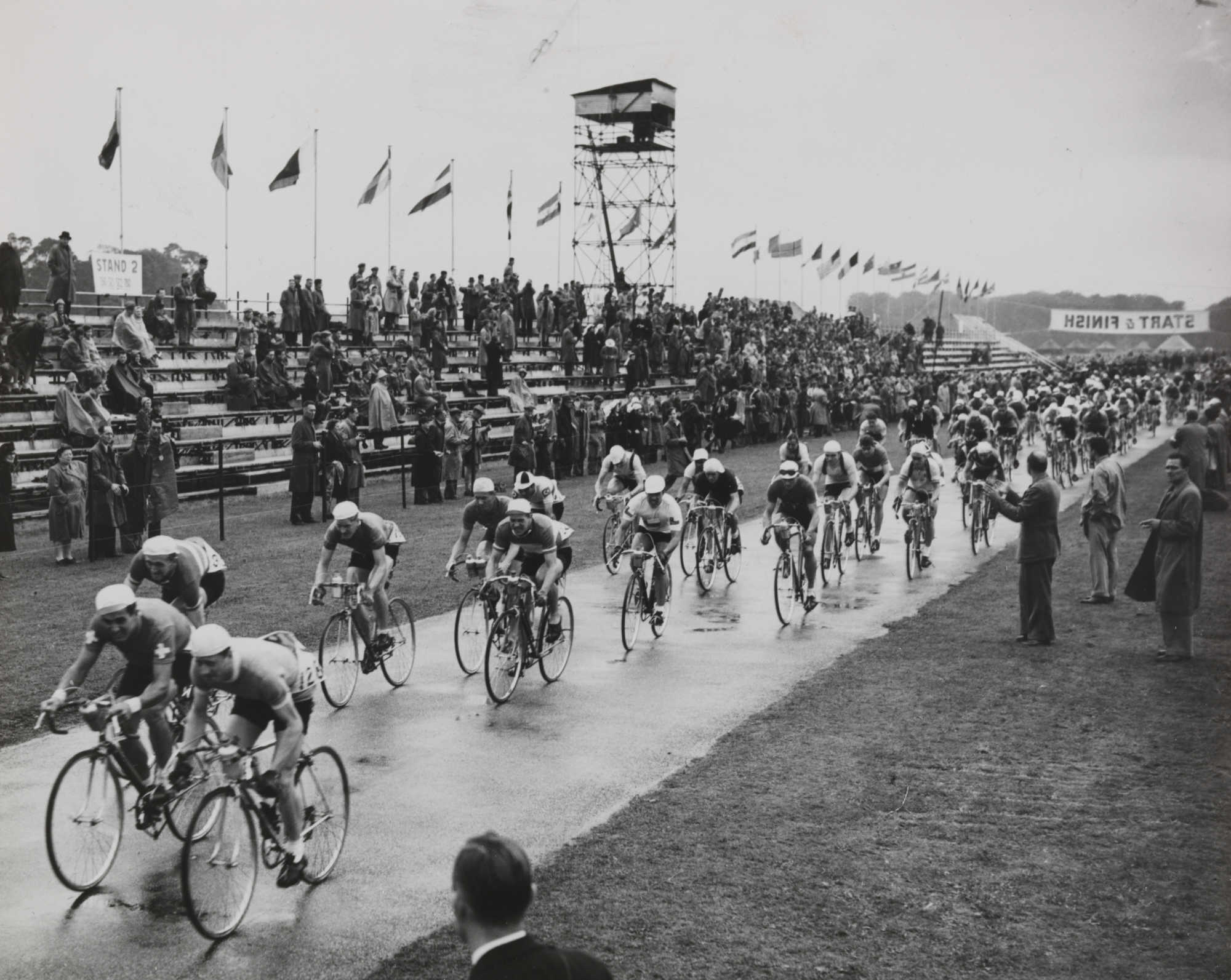
- The peloton passes through the start and finish line
- Venue: Olympic Road Course, Windsor Great Park; 194.633 km (120.9 mi)
- Date: 13 August 1948
- Competitors: 101 from 29 nations
- Winning time: 5:18:12.6

Medalists
1st place, gold medalist(s)		José Beyaert; France
2nd place, silver medalist(s)		Gerrit Voorting; Netherlands
3rd place, bronze medalist(s)		Lode Wouters; Belgium

The men's individual road race at the 1948 Summer Olympics was held on an 11.45 km course. The course was circled seventeen times, so the total length of the competition was 194.6 km. There were 141 entries from 31 nations and 101 participants from 29 nations. Of the 101 starters, 28 rode the distance to the end. The event was won by José Beyaert of France, the nation's second consecutive victory in the men's individual road race. The Netherlands and Belgium won their first medals in the event, with Gerrit Voorting's silver and Lode Wouters's bronze, respectively.

Each nation could enter up to four cyclists. A team classification was made, based on the rankings of the three best cyclists per nation, and this was used to determine the results of the team road race.

== Background ==
This was the third appearance of the event, previously held in 1896 and 1936; it would be held at every Summer Olympics after 1936. It replaced the individual time trial event that had been held from 1912 to 1932 (and which would be reintroduced alongside the road race in 1996). There was no clear favorite, though Adolfo Ferrari of Italy was the reigning world champion. The race was initially intended to be held at Richmond Park in Surrey, but "a law was discovered that prohibited any activity there at more than 20 miles per hour."

Argentina, Guyana, India, Mexico, Norway, Pakistan, South Korea, and Uruguay each made their debut in the men's individual road race. Great Britain made its third appearance in the event, the only nation to have competed in each appearance to date.

== Competition format and course ==
The mass-start race was on a course that covered 17 laps of a 11.45 kilometres circuit around Windsor Great Park, for a total of 194.63 kilometres. The course was "relatively flat." It "included no severe gradients, but was sufficiently undulating to provide a real test of stamina, and with bends . . . which needed all the skill of the contestants at the speed at which the race was run." The surface was less than ideal, with "loose gravel roads" causing numerous punctures.

== Schedule ==
All times are British Summer Time (UTC+1)

Date	Time	Round
Friday, 13 August 1948	11:00	Final

== Results ==
Johansson broke away from the pack during the second lap, with Voorting and Faanhof catching him in lap 3. Johansson suffered a puncture during lap 9, falling back to the peloton. A chase group of nine cyclists caught up to Voorting and Faanhof on lap 12, but crashes and punctures dropped Faanhof, Rasmussen, and Rouffeteau out of the lead pack. Thomas was the first to attempt a breakaway, on lap 16, but was quickly caught by De Lathouwer and less-quickly caught by the rest of the pack in the last lap. Beyaert made two pushes on the last lap, being caught by the pack on the first but separating from the group on a short climb a half-mile away from the finish line; he held on to win the race. Voorting finished with a sprint for the silver medal.

Rank	Cyclist	Nation	Time
1st place, gold medalist(s)	José Beyaert	France	5:18:12.6
2nd place, silver medalist(s)	Gerrit Voorting	Netherlands	5:18:16.2
3rd place, bronze medalist(s)	Lode Wouters	Belgium	5:18:16.2
4	Leon De Lathouwer	Belgium	5:18:16.2
5	Nils Johansson	Sweden	5:18:16.2
6	Bob Maitland	Great Britain	5:18:16.2
7	Jack Hoobin	Australia	5:18:18.2
8	Gordon Thomas	Great Britain	5:18:18.2
9	Adolfo Ferrari	Italy	5:21:45.0
10	Silvio Pedroni	Italy	5:21:45.0
11	Alain Moineau	France	5:21:45.0
12	Eugène Van Roosbroeck	Belgium	5:21:45.0
13	Jakob Schenk	Switzerland	5:21:45.0
14	Rudi Valenta	Austria	5:24:48.0
15	Jean Brun	Switzerland	5:26:54.0
16	Ian Scott	Great Britain	5:26:57.2
17	Jacques Dupont	France	5:12:45.3
18	Harry Snell	Sweden	5:28:22.2
19	Franco Fanti	Italy	5:29:35.2
20	Livio Isotti	Italy	5:31:08.6
21	Ceferino Peroné	Argentina	5:33:15.4
22	Dante Benvenuti	Argentina	5:33:15.4
23	Miguel Sevillano	Argentina	5:33:15.4
24	Åke Olivestedt	Sweden	5:33:48.2
25	Walter Reiser	Switzerland	5:34:25.2
26	Russell Mockridge	Australia	5:39:54.6
27	Kristian Pedersen	Denmark	5:39:57.2
28	Knud Andersen	Denmark	5:39:57.2
—	Mario Mathieu	Argentina	DNF
—	Ken Caves	Australia	DNF
—	Jim Nestor	Australia	DNF
—	Hans Goldschmid	Austria	DNF
—	Siegmund Huber	Austria	DNF
—	Josef Pohnetal	Austria	DNF
—	Liévin Lerno	Belgium	DNF
—	Laddie Lewis	Guyana	DNF
—	Lorne Atkinson	Canada	DNF
—	Florent Jodoin	Canada	DNF
—	Lance Pugh	Canada	DNF
—	Laurent Tessier	Canada	DNF
—	Rafael Iturrate	Chile	DNF
—	Mario Masanés	Chile	DNF
—	Exequiel Ramírez	Chile	DNF
—	Rogelio Salcedo	Chile	DNF
—	Børge Saxil Nielsen	Denmark	DNF
—	Rudolf Rasmussen	Denmark	DNF
—	Paul Backman	Finland	DNF
—	Torvald Högström	Finland	DNF
—	Erkki Koskinen	Finland	DNF
—	René Rouffeteau	France	DNF
—	Ernie Clements	Great Britain	DNF
—	Manthos Kaloudis	Greece	DNF
—	Evangelos Kouvelis	Greece	DNF
—	Petros Leonidis	Greece	DNF
—	Henk Faanhof	Netherlands	DNF
—	Evert Grift	Netherlands	DNF
—	Piet Peters	Netherlands	DNF
—	Bapoo Malcolm	India	DNF
—	Raj Kumar Mehra	India	DNF
—	Eruch Mistry	India	DNF
—	Homi Powri	India	DNF
—	Hwang San-ung	South Korea	DNF
—	Gwon Ik-hyeon	South Korea	DNF
—	Robert Bintz	Luxembourg	DNF
—	Marcel Ernzer	Luxembourg	DNF
—	Henri Kellen	Luxembourg	DNF
—	Pitty Scheer	Luxembourg	DNF
—	Placido Herrera	Mexico	DNF
—	Francisco Rodríguez	Mexico	DNF
—	Gabino Rodríguez	Mexico	DNF
—	Manuel Solis	Mexico	DNF
—	Nick Carter	New Zealand	DNF
—	Lorang Christiansen	Norway	DNF
—	Leif Flengsrud	Norway	DNF
—	Erling Kristiansen	Norway	DNF
—	Aage Myhrvold	Norway	DNF
—	Wazir Ali	Pakistan	DNF
—	Hernán Llerena	Peru	DNF
—	Pedro Mathey	Peru	DNF
—	Luis Poggi	Peru	DNF
—	Dirkie Binneman	South Africa	DNF
—	George Estman	South Africa	DNF
—	Wally Rivers	South Africa	DNF
—	Olle Wänlund	Sweden	DNF
—	Giovanni Rossi	Switzerland	DNF
—	Ali Çetiner	Turkey	DNF
—	Mustafa Osmanlı	Turkey	DNF
—	Orhan Suda	Turkey	DNF
—	Talat Tunçalp	Turkey	DNF
—	Frank Brilando	United States	DNF
—	Ed Lynch	United States	DNF
—	Chester Nelsen	United States	DNF
—	Wendell Rollins	United States	DNF
—	Waldemar Bernatzky	Uruguay	DNF
—	Enrique Demarco	Uruguay	DNF
—	Mario Figueredo	Uruguay	DNF
—	Luis López	Uruguay	DNF
—	Milan Poredski	Yugoslavia	DNF
—	August Prosenik	Yugoslavia	DNF
—	Aleksandar Strain	Yugoslavia	DNF
—	Aleksandar Zorić	Yugoslavia	DNF
