= Chile at the 1948 Summer Olympics =

- IOC code: CHI
- NOC: Chilean Olympic Committee

in London
- Competitors: 54 (50 men and 4 women) in 9 sports
- Flag bearer: Mario Recordón
- Medals: Gold 0 Silver 0 Bronze 0 Total 0

Summer Olympics appearances (overview)
- ~~1896~~; 1900–1908; 1912; 1920; 1924; 1928; 1932; 1936; 1948; 1952; 1956; 1960; 1964; 1968; 1972; 1976; 1980; 1984; 1988; 1992; 1996; 2000; 2004; 2008; 2012; 2016; 2020; 2024; 2028

Chile at the 1948 Summer Olympics in London, England was the nation's eighth appearance out of eleven editions of the Summer Olympic Games. The nation was represented by a team of 54 athletes, 50 males and 4 females, that competed in 27 events in 8 sports.

== Athletics ==
Key

- Note–Ranks given for track events are within the athlete's heat only
- Q = Qualified for the next round

Men
Track & road events

Athlete	Event	Heat		Quarterfinal		Semifinal		Final	
Athlete	Event	Result	Rank	Result	Rank	Result	Rank	Result	Rank
Carlos Silva	100 m	11.08	4	Did not advance					
Alberto Labarthe	100 m	11.0	3	Did not advance					
Gustavo Ehlers	400 m	49.5	3	Did not advance					
Jaime Hitelman	400 m	51.5	4	Did not advance					
Mario Recordón	110 m hurdles	15.3	3	—N/a		Did not advance			
Sergio Guzmán	400 m hurdles	55.9	4	—N/a		Did not advance			
Gustavo Ehlers; Sergio Guzmán; Jaime Hitelman; Carlos Silva	4 × 400 m relay	3:23.8	4	—N/a				Did not advance	
Enrique Inostroza	Marathon	—N/a						2:47:48.0	15

Field events

Athlete	Event	Qualification		Final	
Athlete	Event	Result	Rank	Result	Rank
Carlos Vera	Triple jump	13.850	23	Did not advance	
Alfredo Jadresic	High jump	1.87 Q	1	1.90	9
Edmundo Zúñiga	Hammer throw	44.03	21	Did not advance	

Women
Track & road events

Athlete	Event	Heat		Semifinal		Final	
Athlete	Event	Result	Rank	Result	Rank	Result	Rank
Betty Kretschmer	100 m	Unknown	5	Did not advance			
Betty Kretschmer	200 m	26.3	6	Did not advance			
Annegret Weller-Schneider	200 m	26.4	4	Did not advance			
Marion Huber	80 m hurdles	Unknown	5	Did not advance			
Marion Huber; Betty Kretschmer; Adriana Millard; Annegret Weller-Schneider	4 × 100 m relay	51.5	3	—N/a		Did not advance	

== Basketball ==
Men's Team Competition

- Preliminary Round (Group B)
  - Defeated China (44–39)
  - Defeated Iraq (100–18)
  - Defeated Philippines (68–39)
  - Lost to Belgium (36–38)
  - Lost to South Korea (21–28)
- Quarterfinals
  - Lost to France (52–53)
- Classification Matches
  - 5th/8th place: Defeated Czechoslovakia (38–36)
  - 5th/6th place: Lost to Uruguay (32–50) → Sixth place

== Cycling ==
Four cyclists, all men, represented Chile in 1948.

Individual road race

- Rafael Iturrate
- Mario Masanés
- Exequiel Ramírez
- Rogelio Salcedo

Team road race

- Rafael Iturrate
- Mario Masanés
- Exequiel Ramírez
- Rogelio Salcedo

Sprint

- Mario Masanés

== Diving ==
Men

Athlete	Event	Final	
Athlete	Event	Points	Rank
Günther Mund	3 m springboard	68.08	26

== Fencing ==
Three fencers, all men, represented Chile in 1948.

Men's foil

- Enrique Accorsi

Men's épée

- Enrique Accorsi
- Ignacio Goldstein

Men's sabre

- Andrés Neubauer
- Ignacio Goldstein

== Modern pentathlon ==
Two male pentathletes represented Chile in 1948.

- Nilo Floody
- Hernán Fuentes

== Shooting ==
Four shooters represented Chile in 1948.

25 metre pistol

- Roberto Müller
- Ignacio Cruzat
- Pedro Peña y Lillo

50 metre pistol

- Ignacio Cruzat
- Luis Ruiz Tagle
- Roberto Müller

== Water polo ==
Men's Team Competition

- Preliminary Round (Group C)
  - Lost to India (4–7)
  - Lost to the Netherlands (0–14) → did not advance
