= Cycling at the 1948 Summer Olympics – Men's team road race =

Cycling - Men's team road race at the Games of the XIV Olympiad
- Venue: Olympic Road Course, Windsor Great Park; 194.633 km (120.9 mi)
- Dates: 13 August 1948
- Competitors: 96 (individuals) 25 (teams) from 25 nations

Medalists
| 1st place, gold medalist(s) | | Lode Wouters; Leon De Lathouwer; Eugène Van Roosbroeck; Belgium |
| 2nd place, silver medalist(s) | | Bob Maitland; Gordon Thomas; Ian Scott; Great Britain |
| 3rd place, bronze medalist(s) | | José Beyaert; Alain Moineau; Jacques Dupont; France |

The men's team road race cycling event at the 1948 Olympic Games took place on 13 August and was one of six events at the 1948 Olympics. Teams had four riders and the team time taken as sum of the team's three best finishers.

The race was won by the Belgian team. However, the Belgian cyclists were not aware that there was a team competition, and returned to Belgium, missing the medal ceremony. Only in 2010 did they receive their medals.

== Results ==
=== Final ===
| Rank | Name | Nationality | Time |
|---|---|---|---|
| 1st place, gold medalist(s) | Lode Wouters; Leon De Lathouwer; Eugène Van Roosbroeck; Liévin Lerno | Belgium | 15:58:17.4 |
| 2nd place, silver medalist(s) | Bob Maitland; Gordon Thomas; Ian Scott; Ernie Clements | Great Britain | 16:03:31.6 |
| 3rd place, bronze medalist(s) | José Beyaert; Alain Moineau; Jacques Dupont; René Rouffeteau | France | 16:08:19.4 |
| 4 | Adolfo Ferrari; Silvio Pedroni; Franco Fanti; Livio Isotti | Italy | 16:13:05.2 |
| 5 | Nils Johansson; Harry Snell; Åke Olivestedt; Olle Wänlund | Sweden | 16:20:26.6 |
| 6 | Jakob Schenk; Jean Brun; Walter Reiser; Giovanni Rossi | Switzerland | 16:23:04.2 |
| 7 | Ceferino Peroné; Dante Benvenuti; Miguel Sevillano; Mario Mathieu | Argentina | 16:39:46.2 |
| AC | Jack Hoobin; Russell Mockridge; Jim Nestor; Ken Caves | Australia | DNF |
| AC | Rudi Valenta; Hans Goldschmid; Josef Pohnetal; Siegmund Huber | Austria | DNF |
| AC | Florent Jodoin; Lance Pugh; Laurent Tessier; Lorne Atkinson | Canada | DNF |
| AC | Exequiel Ramírez; Mario Masanés; Rogelio Salcedo; Renato Iturrate | Chile | DNF |
| AC | Kristian Pedersen; Knud Andersen; Børge Saxil Nielsen; Rudolf Rasmussen | Denmark | DNF |
| AC | Erkki Koskinen; Paul Backman; Torvald Högström | Finland | DNF |
| AC | Evangelos Kouvelis; Manthos Kaloudis; Petros Leonidis | Greece | DNF |
| AC | Eruch Mistry; Homi Powri; Bapoo Malcolm; Raj Kumar Mehra | India | DNF |
| AC | Henri Kellen; Marcel Ernzer; Pitty Scheer; Robert Bintz | Luxembourg | DNF |
| AC | Francisco Rodríguez; Gabino Rodríguez; Manuel Solis; Placido Herrera | Mexico | DNF |
| AC | Gerrit Voorting; Evert Grift; Henk Faanhof; Piet Peters | Netherlands | DNF |
| AC | Aage Myhrvold; Erling Kristiansen; Leif Flengsrud; Lorang Christiansen | Norway | DNF |
| AC | Hernán Llerena; Luis Poggi; Pedro Mathey | Peru | DNF |
| AC | George Estman; Dirkie Binneman; Wally Rivers | South Africa | DNF |
| AC | Ali Çetiner; Mustafa Osmanlı; Orhan Suda; Talat Tunçalp | Turkey | DNF |
| AC | Enrique Demarco; Luis López; Mario Figueredo; Waldemar Bernatzky | Uruguay | DNF |
| AC | Chester Nelsen; Ed Lynch; Frank Brilando; Wendell Rollins | United States | DNF |
| AC | Aleksandar Strain; Aleksandar Zorić; August Prosenik; Milan Poredski | Yugoslavia | DNF |
