= Deaths in November 1998 =

The following is a list of notable deaths in November 1998.

Entries for each day are listed alphabetically by surname. A typical entry lists information in the following sequence:

- Name, age, country of citizenship at birth, subsequent country of citizenship (if applicable), reason for notability, cause of death (if known), and reference.

== November 1998 ==
=== 1 ===
- César Castellanos, 51, Honduran politician, mayor of Tegucigalpa (since 1998), helicopter crash.
- Augusto Magli, 75, Italian football player.
- Kunitaka Sueoka, 81, Japanese football player.
- Norbert Wollheim, 85, German-American Holocaust survivor.
- Stanislav Zhuk, 63, Russian Olympic skater (1960), and coach, heart attack.

=== 2 ===
- Janet Arnold, 66, British clothing historian, costume designer and author, lymphoma.
- Sverre Brodahl, 89, Norwegian Nordic skier and Olympic medalist (1936).
- Claude Bramall Burgess, 88, Hong Kong Colonial Secretary.
- Fred Freer, 82, Australian cricket player.
- Henry Horton, 75, English sportsman.
- Rolf Husberg, 90, Swedish film director, screenwriter and actor.
- Jovelina Pérola Negra, 54, Brazilian samba singer and songwriter, heart attack.
- Elmo Plaskett, 60, United States Virgin Islands baseball player (Pittsburgh Pirates).
- Vincent Winter, 50, Scottish child film actor, heart attack.

=== 3 ===
- Ray Bremser, 64, American poet.
- Helmuth Johannsen, 78, German football player and manager.
- Bob Kane, 83, American comic book writer (Batman).
- John Campbell Merrett, 89, Canadian architect.
- P. L. Narayana, 63, Indian film actor and playwright.
- Martha O'Driscoll, 76, American film actress.
- Oriano Quilici, 68, Italian prelate of the Catholic Church.
- Miguel Sevillano, 70, Argentine Olympic cyclist (1948).
- Gerhard Strutz, 55, Austrian Olympic speed skater (1964).
- Nina Youshkevitch, 77, Franco-Russian ballet dancer and teacher.

=== 4 ===
- Jean de Heinzelin de Braucourt, 78, Belgian geologist.
- Marion Donovan, 81, American inventor and entrepreneur.
- Lars Ernster, 78, Swedish biochemist and Nobel Foundation board member.
- Sabino Islas, 80, Mexican Olympic boxer (1936).
- Joyce Lussu, 86, Italian writer and partisan during World War II.
- Maedagawa Katsu, 59, Japanese sumo wrestler.
- Jimmy McGee, 75, Irish Olympic basketball player (1948), and musician.
- William Watson, 80, British Olympic weightlifter (1948).
- Jorge Wehbe, 78, Argentine lawyer and economist, Minister of Economy.

=== 5 ===
- Garlin Murl Conner, 79, United States Army officer during World War II and Medal of Honor recipient.
- Momoko Kōchi, 66, Japanese actress (Godzilla), cancer.
- Nagarjun, 87, Indian poet.
- Jack Stewart, 86, Australian farmer and politician.

=== 6 ===
- Mohamed Taki Abdoulkarim, President of the Comoros.
- Hélmer Herrera Buitrago, 47, Colombian narco and member of the Cali Cartel, shot.
- Jack Hartman, 73, American gridiron football player and basketball coach.
- Bobo Lewis, 72, American comedic actress, cancer.
- Sky Low Low, 70, Canadian midget wrestler, heart attack.
- Niklas Luhmann, 70, German sociologist and philosopher of social science.
- Paavo Sepponen, 75, Finnish Olympic wrestler (1948, 1952).
- Wolfgang Stresemann, 94, German jurist, orchestra leader, conductor and composer.
- István Szőts, 86, Hungarian screenwriter and film director.
- Stan Wright, 77, American track and field coach.

=== 7 ===
- Jitendra Abhisheki, 69, Indian vocalist, composer and music scholar.
- Leonard De Paur, 83, American composer and choral director.
- Agenore Fabbri, 87, Italian sculptor and painter.
- Margaret Gowing, 77, English historian, Alzheimer's disease.
- John Hunt, Baron Hunt, 88, British Army officer.
- Vladimir Matskevich, 88, Soviet apparatchik and ambassador.
- Börje Mellvig, 86, Swedish actor, screenwriter, director and lyricist.
- Ted Slevin, 71, English rugby player.
- Jiwan Singh Umranangal, 84, Indian politician.
- O. Meredith Wilson, 89, American historian and academic, brain cancer.

=== 8 ===
- Rumer Godden, 90, English author (Black Narcissus), complications from a series of strokes.
- Jemal Karchkhadze, Georgian writer.
- Thomas Henry Manning, 86, British-Canadian Arctic explorer, geographer, zoologist, and author.
- Jean Marais, 84, French actor, writer and sculptor, cardiovascular disease.
- Lonnie Pitchford, 43, American blues musician and instrument maker.
- Erol Taş, 70, Turkish film actor, diabetes.

=== 9 ===
- Baya, 66, Algerian artist.
- Henry Dorman, 82, American lawyer and politician.
- Phillip Paske, 45, American child pornographer, AIDS.
- Anura Ranasinghe, 42, Sri Lankan cricketer, heart attack.
- Ursula Reit, 84, German actress.
- Francis Scully, 73, American sailor and Olympic medalist (1964).

=== 10 ===
- Svetlana Beriosova, 66, Lithuanian-British prima ballerina, cancer.
- Peter Cotes, 86, English actor, writer, and director.
- Mahmoud Hassan, 78, Egyptian Greco-Roman bantamweight wrestler and Olympic medalist (1948, 1952).
- Henry James, 78, British civil servant (born 1919).
- Jean Leray, 92, French mathematician.
- Georg Liebsch, 87, German featherweight weightlifter and Olympian (1936).
- Mary Millar, 62, British actress (Keeping Up Appearances) and singer, ovarian cancer.
- Luis Miloc, 69, Uruguayan footballer and manager.
- Hal Newhouser, 77, American baseball player (Detroit Tigers) and member of the MLB Hall of Fame, respiratory disease.
- Ellis Robinson, 87, English cricketer.
- Øistein Saksvik, 73, Norwegian long-distance runner and Olympian (1952).
- Kunitaka Sueoka, 81, Japanese footballer.

=== 11 ===
- Frank Brimsek, 83, American ice hockey player (Boston Bruins, Chicago Black Hawks).
- Patrick Clancy, 76, Irish folk singer, lung cancer.
- Gérard Grisey, 52, French composer of contemporary classical music, ruptured aneurysm.
- Maurice Gueissaz, 75, Swiss Olympic rower (1948).
- Bronisław Karwecki, 86, Polish Olympic rower (1936).
- Ferdinand Kulmer, 73, Croatian abstract painter.
- Allan Kwartler, 81, American sabre, foil fencer and Olympian (1952, 1956, 1960).
- Sam Melberg, 86, Norwegian sports diver and Olympian (1936).
- Elvis Jacob Stahr, Jr., 82, American government official and college president.
- Anicet Utset, 66, Spanish cyclist.

=== 12 ===
- Janet Alcoriza, 80, American screenwriter and actress.
- Alejandro Arteche, 75, Spanish Olympic boxer (1948).
- Bernie Crowl, 90, American football player (Brooklyn Dodgers).
- Jack Gelineau, 74, Canadian ice hockey player (Boston Bruins, Chicago Black Hawks), cancer.
- James H. Gray, 92, Canadian journalist, historian and author.
- Randall S. Herman, 84, British Indian-born Guamanian politician.
- Paul Hoffman, 73, American basketball player (Baltimore Bullets, New York Knicks, Philadelphia Warriors), brain tumor.
- Roy Hollis, 72, English football player.
- Asher Joel, 86, Australian politician and public servant.
- Kenny Kirkland, 43, American pianist and keyboardist, congestive heart failure.
- Lu Ann Meredith, 85, American film actress.
- Sally Shlaer, 59, American mathematician, software engineer and methodologist.

=== 13 ===
- Don Bishop, 64, American gridiron football player (Pittsburgh Steelers, Chicago Bears, Dallas Cowboys).
- Joseph C. Brun, 91, French-American cinematographer.
- Edwige Feuillère, 91, French actress.
- Valerie Hobson, 81, Irish-born actress, heart attack.
- Red Holzman, 78, American basketball player, (Rochester Royals), and coach (Milwaukee/St. Louis Hawks, New York Knicks), leukemia.
- Hendrik Timmer, 94, Dutch sportsman and Olympic medalist (1924).
- Michel Trudeau, 23, Canadian outdoorsman, and son of Prime Minister Pierre Trudeau and brother of Prime Minister Justin Trudeau, avalanche.
- Ilie Văduva, 64, Romanian communist politician.
- Al Wright, 86, American baseball player (Boston Braves).
- Doug Wright, 84, English cricket player.

=== 14 ===
- Eli Cashdan, 93, British rabbi.
- Quentin Crewe, 72, English journalist, author, restaurateur and adventurer.
- Albert Frey, 95, Swiss-American architect.
- Rachel Holzer, 99, Australian theatre actress and director.
- Mary Lawler, 52, American Olympic speed skater (1964).
- Waltraut Peck-Repa, 58, Austrian Olympic fencer (1960, 1972).

=== 15 ===
- Stokely Carmichael, 57, Trinidadian-American political activist, prostate cancer.
- Henryk Chmielewski, 84, Polish boxer and Olympian (1936).
- Lawrence Krader, 78, American socialist anthropologist and ethnologist.
- Federico Krutwig, 77, Spanish Basque writer, philosopher, and politician.
- William T. Miller, 87, American professor of organic chemistry.
- Doris Niles, 93, American dancer.
- Leo Aloysius Pursley, 96, American clergyman of the Roman Catholic Church.

=== 16 ===
- Ludvík Daněk, 61, Czechoslovak discus thrower and Olympic champion (1964, 1968, 1972, 1976), heart attack.
- Bob Davis, 77, American football player (Pittsburgh Steelers).
- Tyrone Delano Gilliam, Jr., 32, American convicted murderer, execution by lethal injection.
- Mohammad-Taqi Ja'fari, 73, Iranian scholar, philosopher and Islamic theologist.
- Queenie McKenzie, 68, Aboriginal Australian artist.
- Christel Rupke, 79, German Olympic swimmer (1936).
- Alexander Smorchkov, 78, Soviet fighter pilot during World War II and the Korean War.
- J. D. Sumner, 73, American gospel singer and songwriter.

=== 17 ===
- Kea Bouman, 94, Dutch tennis player and Olympian (1924).
- Weeb Ewbank, 91, American football coach (Baltimore Colts, New York Jets) and member of the Pro Football Hall of Fame, heart problems.
- Efim Geller, 73, Soviet chess player and grandmaster.
- Jean Herly, 78, Monegasque diplomat and ambassador.
- Casey Jones, 80, American baseball player.
- Reinette L'Oranaise, 80, Algerian singer.
- Kenneth McDuff, 52, American serial killer, execution by lethal injection.
- Jacques Médecin, 70, French politician, cardiac arrest.
- Miguel A. García Méndez, 96, Puerto Rican lawyer and politician.
- Dick O'Neill, 70, American actor (The Jerk, The Taking of Pelham One Two Three, Cagney & Lacey).
- Esther Rolle, 78, American actress (Good Times, Maude, Driving Miss Daisy), Emmy winner (1979), diabetes.
- Bill Ward, 79, American cartoonist (Torchy).

=== 18 ===
- Telemaco Arcangeli, 75, Italian Olympian racewalker (1952).
- Norma Connolly, 71, American actress.
- Hal Davis, 65, American songwriter and record producer.
- Robin Hall, 62, Scottish folksinger.
- Jeanine Moulin, 86, Belgian poet and literary scholar.
- Aurélio de Lira Tavares, 93, Brazilian Army general.

=== 19 ===
- Louis Dumont, 87, French anthropologist.
- Ted Fujita, 78, Japanese-American meteorologist.
- Alfred 'Ken' Gatward, 84, British Royal Air Force pilot during World War II.
- Earl Kim, 78, American composer, and music pedagogue, lung cancer.
- William J. McCarthy, 79, American labor leader.
- Alan J. Pakula, 70, American film director and producer (All the President's Men, The Parallax View, To Kill a Mockingbird), traffic collision.

=== 20 ===
- Roland Alphonso, 67, Jamaican tenor saxophonist.
- Marian Brandys, 86, Polish writer and screenwriter.
- George Brophy, 72, American baseball executive.
- Howard Wilson Emmons, 86, American professor in Mechanical Engineering.
- Meredith Gourdine, 69, American physicist, athlete and Olympic medalist (1952).
- John Grimek, 88, American bodybuilder, weightlifter and Olympian (1936).
- Cec Luining, 67, Canadian football player.
- Mario Orozco Rivera, 68, Mexican muralist and painter.
- Dick Sisler, 78, American baseball player (St. Louis Cardinals, Philadelphia Phillies, Cincinnati Reds), coach and manager.
- Galina Starovoytova, 52, Soviet dissident, shot.

=== 21 ===
- Thomas V. Bermingham, American Jesuit priest and Classical scholar.
- Dariush Forouhar, 69–70, Iranian pan-Iranist politician, stabbed.
- Otto Frankel, 98, Austrian-Australian geneticist.
- Dave Huffman, 41, American football player (Minnesota Vikings), traffic collision.
- Andy Logan, 80, American football player (Detroit Lions).
- Giles Pellerin, 91, American gridiron football player.
- Alvin P. Shapiro, 77, American physician and professor, complications of kidney failure.
- Ormond R. Simpson, 83, United States Marine Corps officer.
- Fabian Ver, 78, Filipino military officer, pulmonary complications.
- Nosson Meir Wachtfogel, 88, Russian-American Orthodox rabbi.

=== 22 ===
- Harlan Parker Banks, 85, American paleobotanist and phycologist.
- Vladimir Demikhov, 82, Soviet scientist and organ transplantation pioneer.
- Henry Hampton, 58, American filmmaker.
- Mikołaj Kozakiewicz, 74, Polish politician, publicist and sociologist.
- Harry Lehmann, 74, German physicist.
- Celeste Mendoza, 68, Cuban singer.
- Holt Rast, 81, American football player.
- Jack Shadbolt, 89, Canadian painter.
- Stu Ungar, 45, American professional poker, blackjack, and gin rummy player, heart problems.

=== 23 ===
- Eduardo Cornejo, 68-69, Chilean Olympic boxer (1948).
- Lamar McHan, 65, American football player and coach, heart attack.
- Gene Moore, 88, American designer and window dresser.
- Dan Osman, 35, American extreme sport practitioner, rock climbing accident.
- Ralph S. Phillips, 85, American mathematician and academic.
- Don Ray, 77, American basketball player (Tri-Cities Blackhawks).
- Eugen Seiterle, 84, Swiss field handball player and Olympic medalist (1936).

=== 24 ===
- Len Barnum, 86, American gridiron football player (New York Giants, Philadelphia Eagles).
- John Chadwick, 78, English linguist and classical scholar who deciphered Linear B.
- Bert Cook, 69, American basketball player (New York Knicks).
- Minnette de Silva, 80, Sri Lankan architect.
- Eprime Eshag, 80, Iranian economist.
- Guido Figone, 71, Italian Olympic gymnast (1948, 1952).
- Nicholas Kurti, 90, Hungarian-British physicist.
- George F. Sprague, 96, American geneticist and researcher.
- Theodore Strongin, 79, American music critic, composer, flautist, and entomologist.
- Nikola Tanhofer, 71, Croatian film director, screenwriter and cinematographer.

=== 25 ===
- Robert Eisner, 76, American author and economist, bone marrow disorder.
- Nelson Goodman, 92, American philosopher.
- Parmeshwar Narayan Haksar, 85, Indian diplomat.
- Russ Kopak, 74, Canadian ice hockey player (Boston Bruins).
- Anwar Mesbah, 85, Egyptian weightlifter and Olympic champion (1936).
- Stanisław Ożóg, 68, Polish Olympic long-distance runner (1960).
- Enrico Sabbatini, 66, Italian costume designer (The Mission, Seven Years in Tibet, Cutthroat Island) and production designer, traffic collision.
- Fiatau Penitala Teo, 87, Tuvaluan political figure.
- Flip Wilson, 64, American comedian and actor, liver cancer.

=== 26 ===
- Gerald Battrick, 51, Welsh tennis player.
- Charles Moihi Te Arawaka Bennett, 85, New Zealand broadcaster, military leader and public servant.
- Mike Calvert, 85, British Army officer.
- M. T. Cheng, 81, Chinese mathematician.
- Ox Emerson, 90, American football player (Portsmouth Spartans/Detroit Lions, Brooklyn Dodgers).
- Gyo Fujikawa, 90, American illustrator and children's author.
- Tom Lyon, 83, Scottish footballer.
- Ed Smith, 69, American basketball player (New York Knicks).
- Felix Zwolanowski, 86, German international footballer.

=== 27 ===
- Barbara Acklin, 55, American soul singer and songwriter, pneumonia.
- William Baxter, 69, American professor of law.
- Gloria Fuertes, 81, Spanish poet and children's author, lung cancer.
- Jozef IJsewijn, 65, Belgian Latinist.
- Douglas LePan, 84, Canadian diplomat, poet, novelist and professor of literature.
- Herman Murray, 89, Canadian ice hockey player and Olympian (1936).
- Andrey Sergeev, 65, Russian writer and translator, traffic collision.
- Vicki Viidikas, 50, Australian poet.

=== 28 ===
- Dante Fascell, 81, American politician, member of the United States House of Representatives (1955-1993), colorectal cancer.
- Frederick William Freking, 85, American prelate of the Roman Catholic Church, emphysema.
- M. Donald Grant, 94, American baseball executive (New York Mets).
- Roberta Kevelson, 67, American academic and semiotician.
- James C. Lucas, 86, American criminal and inmate of Alcatraz penitentiary.
- Augie Scott, 77, English football player and manager.
- Maurice Seynaeve, 91, Belgian cyclo-cross rider.
- John Stanford, 60, American Army officer.
- Kerry Wendell Thornley, 60, American counterculture figure and writer, heart attack.

=== 29 ===
- Roy Benavidez, 63, United States Army Special Forces member and Medal of Honor recipient, complications of diabetes.
- Gino De Dominicis, 51, Italian artist.
- Adolfo Ferrari, 74, Italian Olympic cyclist (1948).
- Maus Gatsonides, 87, Dutch rally driver and inventor.
- Jack Gilbert, 80, Australian World War II veteran and rugby player.
- Giant Haystacks, 52, British professional wrestler, lymphoma.
- Pépé Kallé, 46, Congolese musician, heart attack.
- Frank Latimore, 73, American actor.
- Earl Eugene O'Connor, 76, American district judge (United States District Court for the District of Kansas).
- Živojin Pavlović, 65, Yugoslav and Serbian film director, writer, and painter.
- Robin Ray, 64, English broadcaster, actor, and musician, lung cancer.
- Jim Turner, 95, American baseball player (Boston Bees, Cincinnati Reds, New York Yankees).
- George Van Eps, 85, American swing and jazz guitarist, pneumonia.

=== 30 ===
- Pentti Aalto, 81, Finnish linguist, heart disease.
- Abdullah Al-Muti, 68, Bangladeshi educationist and writer.
- Ruth Clifford, 98, American actress.
- Alfo Ferrari, 74, Italian cyclist.
- Jesse Levan, 72, American baseball player (Philadelphia Phillies, Washington Senators).
- Ad Liska, 92, American baseball pitcher (Washington Senators, Philadelphia Phillies).
- Simon Nkoli, 41, South African anti-apartheid and gay rights activist, AIDS.
- Johnny Roventini, 88, American actor.
- Philip Sterling, 76, American actor.
- James Strauch, 77, American Olympic fencer (1952).
- Margaret Walker, 83, American poet and writer, breast cancer.

== Sources ==
- Mank, Gregory William (2015). Women in Horror Films, 1930s. Jefferson, North Carolina: McFarland. ISBN 978-1-4766-0954-6.
