= Ernie Clements =

English cyclist (1922–2006)

Personal information
- Full name: Ernest A Clements
- Nickname: Ernie
- Born: 28 February 1922 Hadley, Shropshire, England
- Died: 3 February 2006 (aged 83) Malvern, Worcestershire, England

Cycling career
- Sport: Cycling
- Discipline: Road
- Role: Rider
Medal record
Representing GBR
Men's cycling
Olympic Games
Silver medal – second place	London 1948	Team road race

Ernest J Clements (28 February 1922 – 3 February 2006) was an English road racing cyclist, frame builder and cycle shop owner.

== Biography ==
Born in Hadley, Telford, Shropshire, Clements was one of the leaders in the introduction of massed start road races to Britain, initially as a rider and later as a sponsor.

He won the BLRC British national road race championship in 1943 and 1945, and came second in 1944. Riders who competed in BLRC races were banned from competing in NCU races, but Clements managed to circumvent the ban; he won the NCU national road championship in 1946 and come second in 1948. If Clements had not been a member of the NCU, he would not have been considered to ride the world amateur road championship in 1946, nor the 1948 Summer Olympics in London. At the latter event, he won a silver medal as part of the team in the road race - alongside team mates Bob Maitland, Gordon Thomas and Ian Scott.

Clements also won the first stage of the Brighton-Glasgow race in 1951. Note - possible inaccuracies: The 1946 Brighton-Glasgow race programme states that E A (Ernie) Clements won the first stage of the 1945 Brighton-Glasgow race. This also indicates that Ernie Clements was Ernest A rather than Ernest J Clements. This is supported by the Register of Births for England and Wales which lists an Ernest A Clements as being registered in the March quarter of 1922 in the Wellington District of Shropshire.

In 1947, there was a proposal that he turn professional should Britain send a team to the Tour de France. Clements declined and in the event no team was sent anyway. Clements said he turned down the chance because he did not wish to relinquish his amateur status in Britain. At the time, cyclists in Britain were unable to return to amateur status once they had been professionals. This proved restrictive for many professional cyclists, who at the end of their careers were unable to return to competing at a lower level purely for enjoyment.

Clements was born in Hadley, Shropshire but spent the majority of his early years at Old Park where he later opened a cycle shop. He became a frame builder and managed Falcon Cycles in the 1950s, and up to the 1970s.

His last address was in Ledbury, Herefordshire where, aged 67 in 1990, he opened Clements Cycles to keep in touch with cycling. He died in Malvern Community Hospital, Malvern, Worcestershire, aged 83 on 5 February 2006, having suffered from Parkinson's disease for several years.

== In memoriam ==
His death was announced in the Cycling Weekly magazine through a paid small-ad. It said:

CLEMENTS - ERNEST. (cycle trader and former road racing champion) died peacefully on February 3rd 2006. Aged 83 years. Husband of Rosemary and father of Edward. A quiet family funeral will take place. Details of a memorial service to follow.

== Memorial race ==
In his memory, the annual Ernie Clements Memorial two-day stage race is organised by Rob Finch on behalf of the LVRC League of Veteran Racing Cyclists, with separate races for riders aged 40–54 and 55 and over. There are two stages in the first day of racing, a short prologue (1.36 miles in 2007) and a criterium (27 miles in 2007), the third stage, on the second day, is a Road race (64/48 miles in 2007).

=== Palmarès ===
1943
1st (United Kingdom) BLRC British National Road Race Championship
1st Tour of the Peak (1st edition)
1944
1st 2nd Tour of the Peak
2nd BLRC national road race championship
1945
1st (United Kingdom) BLRC national road race championship
1946
1st (United Kingdom) NCU national road race championship
1948
2nd Team Road Race, Olympic Games
2nd NCU national road race championship
1951
1as Stage 1, from Brighton to London, Brighton-Glasgow stage race
