= Van Roosbroeck =

Van Roosbroeck is a surname. Notable people with the surname include:

- Eugène Van Roosbroeck (1928–2018), Belgian cyclist
- Gustaaf Van Roosbroeck (born 1948), Belgian cyclist
