= Gabino Rodriguez =

Gabino Rodríguez is the name of:

- Gabino Rodríguez (footballer) (born 1964), Spanish former footballer
- Gabino Rodríguez (cyclist) (1927–1998), Mexican cyclist who competed in the 1948 Olympics
- Gabino Rodríguez, actor nominated for the Ariel Award for Best Supporting Actor in 2007
