= Aleksandar Zorić =

Yugoslav cyclist

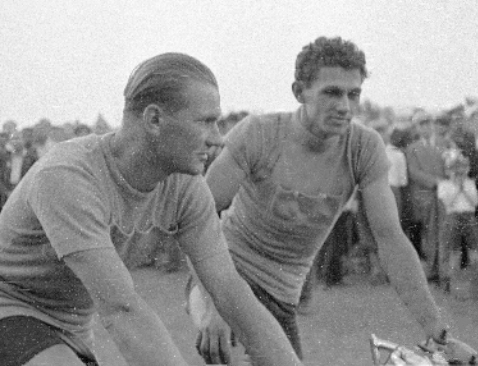
- August Prosenik and Aleksandar Zorić (right) at the 1948 Peace Race

Personal information
- Born: 17 October 1925 Zemun, Kingdom of Serbs, Croats, and Slovenes
- Died: 17 November 2000 (aged 75)

Cycling career
- Sport: Cycling

Aleksandar Zorić (17 October 1925 – 17 November 2000) was a Yugoslav cyclist who competed in the individual and team road race events at the 1948 Summer Olympics. The same year he won the Peace Race and the Tour of Yugoslavia.

Zorić was Serbian. His father was killed during World War II, and Zorić lost an eye in 1945 during a bombing of Belgrade. After retiring from competitions he worked as a farmer, and later immigrated to the United States.
