= Chester Nelsen =

Chester Nelsen may refer to:

- Chester Nelsen Sr. (1902–1987), American Olympic cyclist who competed in the 1928 Summer Olympics
- Chester Nelsen Jr. (1922–2018), American Olympic cyclist who competed in the 1948 Summer Olympics
