= Binneman =

Binneman is a surname. Notable people with the surname include:

- Dirkie Binneman (1918–1959), South African cyclist
- Hennie Binneman (1914–1968), South African cyclist
