= Osvaldo Benvenuti =

Argentine cyclist

Personal information
- Born: 17 October 1951 (age 74) La Matanza Partido, Buenos Aires, Argentina

Cycling career
- Sport: Cycling

Osvaldo Francisco Benvenuti (born 17 October 1951) is an Argentine former cyclist. He competed in the individual road race and team time trial events at the 1976 Summer Olympics. His father, Dante, was also a cyclist.
