= Ed Lynch (cyclist) =

American cyclist

Personal information
- Born: April 29, 1929 Canton, Ohio, United States
- Died: March 22, 1980 (aged 50)

Cycling career
- Sport: Cycling

Edward Arnold Lynch (April 29, 1929 – March 22, 1980) was an American cyclist. He competed in the individual and team road race events at the 1948 Summer Olympics.
