= Robert Bintz =

Luxembourgish cyclist (1930–2022)

Personal information
- Born: 16 February 1930 Mamer, Luxembourg
- Died: 4 September 2022 (aged 92) Bettembourg, Luxembourg

Cycling career
- Sport: Cycling

Robert Bintz (16 February 1930 – 4 September 2022) was a Luxembourgish cyclist. He competed in the individual and team road race events at the 1948 Summer Olympics. He also rode in the 1951 Tour de France. Bintz died in Bettembourg on 4 September 2022, at the age of 92.
