= Henri Kellen =

Luxembourgish cyclist

Personal information
- Born: 7 April 1927 Hautcharage, Luxembourg
- Died: 27 August 1950 (aged 23)

Cycling career
- Sport: Cycling

Henri Kellen (7 April 1927 – 27 August 1950) was a Luxembourgish cyclist. He competed in the individual and team road race events at the 1948 Summer Olympics.
