= Jean Brun (cyclist) =

Swiss cyclist

Personal information
- Born: 28 September 1926 Geneva, Switzerland
- Died: 30 September 1993 (aged 67) Geneva, Switzerland

Cycling career
- Sport: Cycling

Jean Brun (28 September 1926 – 30 September 1993) was a Swiss cyclist. He competed in the individual and team road race events at the 1948 Summer Olympics.
