= Luis Poggi =

Peruvian cyclist

Personal information
- Full name: Luis Poggi
- Born: 7 December 1928
- Died: 4 November 2017 (aged 88)

Cycling career
- Sport: Cycling

Luis Poggi (7 December 1928 – 4 November 2017) was a Peruvian cyclist. He competed in the individual and team road race events at the 1948 Summer Olympics.
