= Siegmund Huber =

Austrian cyclist (1925–2018)

Personal information
- Born: 22 November 1925
- Died: 4 September 2018 (aged 92) Innsbruck, Austria

Cycling career
- Sport: Cycling

Siegmund Huber (22 November 1925 – 4 September 2018) was an Austrian cyclist. He competed in the individual and team road race events at the 1948 Summer Olympics. Huber died in Innsbruck on 4 September 2018, at the age of 92.
