= Piet Peters =

Dutch cyclist

Personal information
- Born: 28 September 1921 Haarlem, Netherlands
- Died: 20 January 1993 (aged 71) Haarlem, Netherlands

Cycling career
- Sport: Cycling

Pieter Peters (28 September 1921 – 20 January 1993) was a Dutch cyclist. He competed in the individual and team road race events at the 1948 Summer Olympics.

== See also ==
- List of Dutch Olympic cyclists
