= Lorne Atkinson =

Canadian cyclist (1921–2010)

Personal information
- Born: 8 June 1921 Vancouver, British Columbia, Canada
- Died: 23 April 2010 (aged 88) Vancouver, British Columbia, Canada

Cycling career
- Sport: Cycling

Lorne Atkinson (8 June 1921 – 23 April 2010) was a Canadian cyclist. He competed in four events at the 1948 Summer Olympics. Nicknamed "Ace", Atkinson spent his life involved in cycling in the Vancouver area.

== Biography ==
Atkinson was born in Vancouver, British Columbia in 1921. Atkinson's father was a Scottish professional cyclist, with Atkinson competing in races from when he was a teenager. He soon earned the nickname "Ace" after winning a race and a newspaper printing a story with the headline of "City ace triumphs in Province Cup". He became a junior provincial champion in 1939, and would go on to win four senior provincial titles and two national titles. In 1946, Atkinson founded his business Ace's Cycles, which he ran for more than 60 years.

At the 1948 Summer Olympics in London, Atkinson competed in four events, two on the road and two on the track. On the road, Atkinson rode in both the individual road race and the team road race, but did not finish in either event. On the track, he was eliminated in the first round of the team pursuit event, and finished in 15th place in the track time trial.

Following the Olympics, Atkinson competed at the 1950 British Empire Games in Auckland, and the 1954 British Empire and Commonwealth Games in his hometown. He was also the captain of the Canadian team that finished in fourth place in the 10-mile scratch event at the 1954 Games. He was in charge of organising cycling events in Vancouver during the 1950s and 1960s, becoming the president of the Vancouver Bicycle Club in 1962. Five years later, he coached the Canadian team at the 1967 Pan American Games in Winnipeg.

Atkinson was inducted into the BC Sports Hall of Fame in 1997, was awarded with the Queen Elizabeth II Golden Jubilee Medal in 2002, and won the British Columbia Community Achievement Award in 2006. Just prior to his death, he was presented with the Olympic torch as part of the relay for the 2010 Winter Olympics. He died in April 2010 at the age of 88.
