= Francisco Rodríguez (cyclist, born 1915) =

Mexican cyclist (1915–1998)

Personal information
- Born: 10 October 1915 Amealco, Querétaro, Mexico
- Died: 1 June 1998 (aged 82) Mexico City, Mexico

Cycling career
- Sport: Cycling

Francisco Rodríguez (10 October 1915 – 1 June 1998) was a Mexican cyclist. He competed in the individual and team road race events at the 1948 Summer Olympics.
