= Manuel Solis (cyclist) =

Mexican cyclist (born 1920)

Personal information
- Full name: Manuel Solís Archundia
- Born: 10 May 1920 Ciudad Hidalgo, Mexico

Cycling career
- Sport: Cycling

Manuel Solis (born 10 May 1920, date of death unknown) was a Mexican cyclist. He competed in the individual and team road race events at the 1948 Summer Olympics. Solis is deceased.
