= Milan Poredski =

Yugoslav cyclist

Personal information
- Born: 21 February 1922 Zagreb, Kingdom of Serbs, Croats, and Slovenes
- Died: 7 May 2005 (aged 83)

Cycling career
- Sport: Cycling

Milan Poredski (21 February 1922 – 7 May 2005) was a Yugoslav cyclist. He competed in the individual and team road race events at the 1948 Summer Olympics.
