= Luis López (cyclist) =

Uruguayan cyclist (1911-1998)

Luis López Conde
Personal information
- Full name: Luis López
- Born: 29 June 1911 Montevideo, Uruguay
- Died: 1998 (aged 86–87) Montevideo, Uruguay

Cycling career
- Sport: Cycling

Luis López (29 June 1911 – 1998) was an Uruguayan cyclist. He competed in the individual and team road race events at the 1948 Summer Olympics. He died in 1998, in his 87th year.
