= Alain Moineau =

French cyclist

Personal information
- Born: 15 May 1928 Clichy, Hauts-de-Seine, France
- Died: 20 October 1986 (aged 58) Marseille, France

Cycling career
- Sport: Cycling
Medal record
Representing FRA
Men's cycling
Olympic Games
Bronze medal – third place	London 1948	Team road race

Alain Moineau (15 May 1928 – 20 October 1986) was a French cyclist. He was born in Clichy, Hauts-de-Seine. He won a bronze medal in the team road race at the 1948 Summer Olympics in London, together with José Beyaert and Jacques Dupont.
