= Pedro Mathey =

Peruvian cyclist

Personal information
- Born: 13 March 1928 Callao, Peru
- Died: 8 October 1985 (aged 57) Huacho, Peru

Cycling career
- Sport: Cycling

Pedro Mathey (13 March 1928 – 8 October 1985) was a Peruvian cyclist. He competed in the individual and team road race events at the 1948 Summer Olympics.
