= Mustafa Osmanlı =

Turkish cyclist (born 1920)

Personal information
- Born: 7 March 1920
- Died: before 2013

Cycling career
- Sport: Cycling

Mustafa Osmanlı (7 March 1920 – before 2013) was a Turkish cyclist. He competed in the individual and team road race events at the 1948 Summer Olympics.
