= Dante Benvenuti =

Argentine cyclist

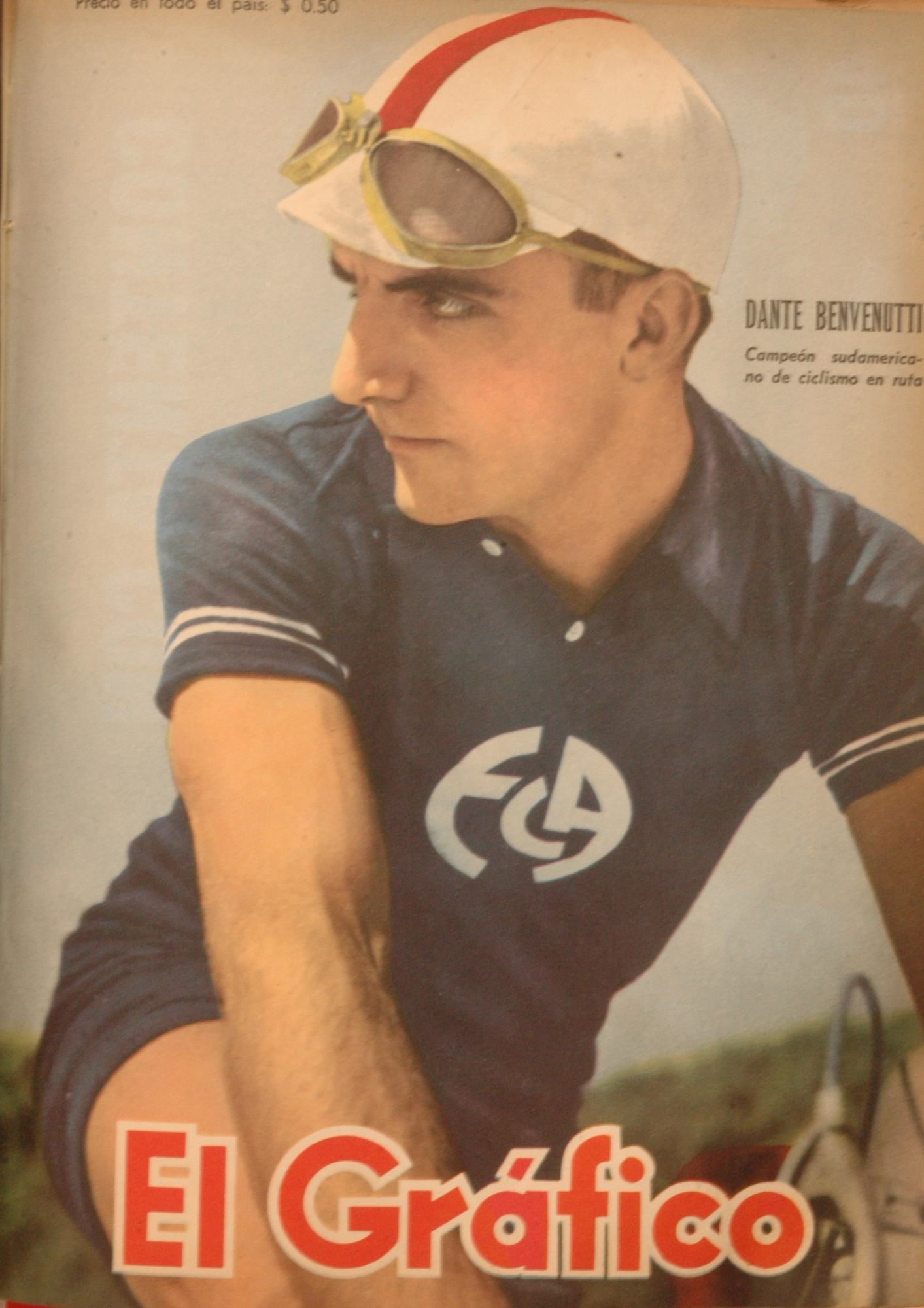
- Benvenuti in El Gráfico, 1949

Personal information
- Born: 10 July 1925 Buenos Aires, Argentina
- Died: 19 March 2012 (aged 86)

Cycling career
- Sport: Cycling

Dante Francisco Benvenuti Lenardon (10 July 1925 – 19 March 2012) was an Argentine cyclist. He competed in the individual and team road race events at the 1948 Summer Olympics. His son, Osvaldo, also became a cyclist.
