= Hernán Llerena =

Peruvian cyclist

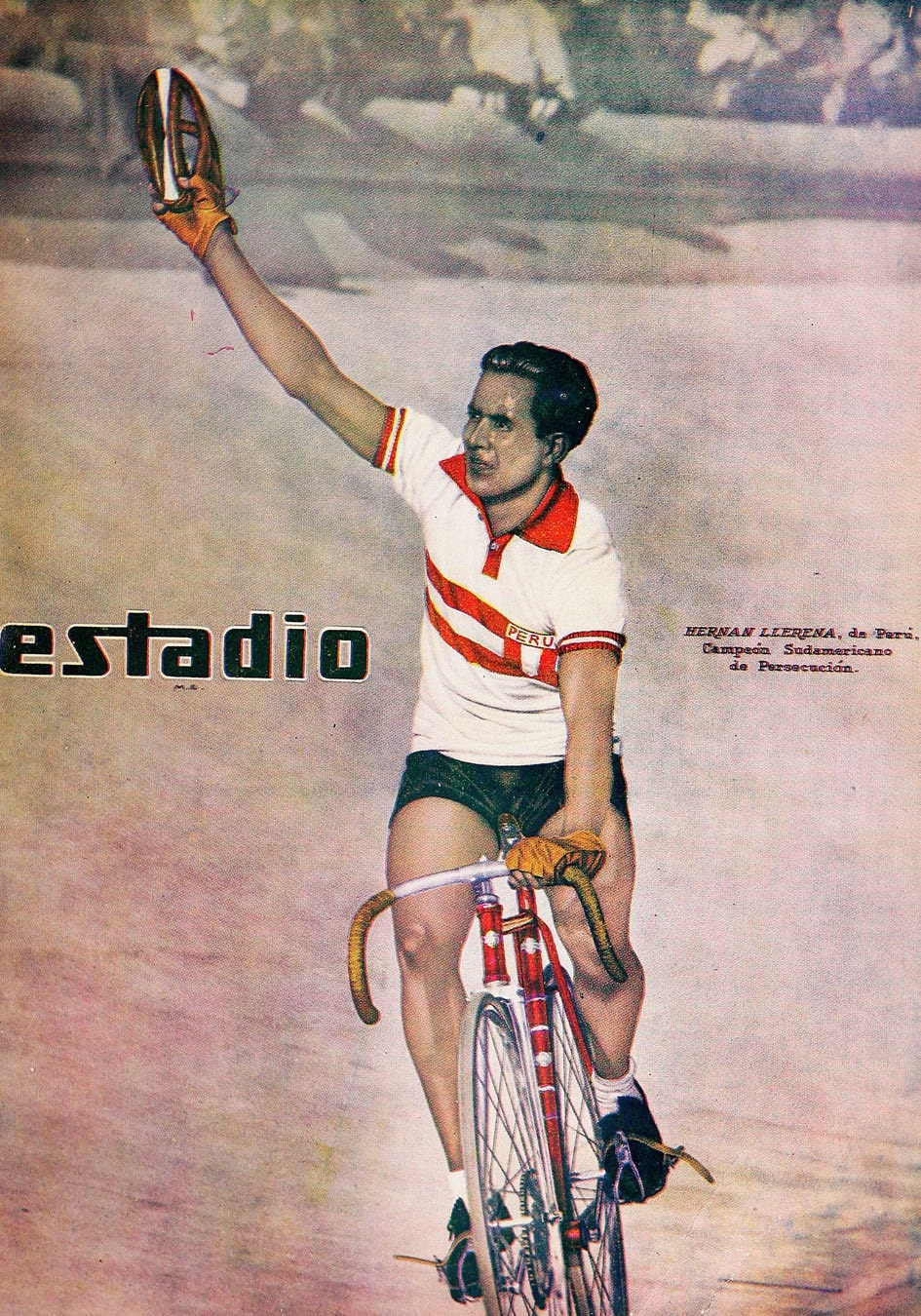

Personal information
- Born: 28 December 1928 Arequipa, Peru
- Died: 14 March 2010 (aged 81) Arequipa, Peru

Cycling career
- Sport: Cycling

Hernán Llerena (28 December 1928 – 14 March 2010) was a Peruvian cyclist. He competed in the individual and team road race events at the 1948 Summer Olympics.
