= Enrique Demarco =

Uruguayan cyclist

Personal information
- Born: 12 October 1923 Durazno, Uruguay
- Died: 13 May 1994 (aged 70)

Cycling career
- Sport: Cycling

Enrique Demarco (12 October 1923 – 13 May 1994) was a Uruguayan cyclist. He competed in the individual and team road race events at the 1948 Summer Olympics.
