= Kwaadmechelen =

- Village
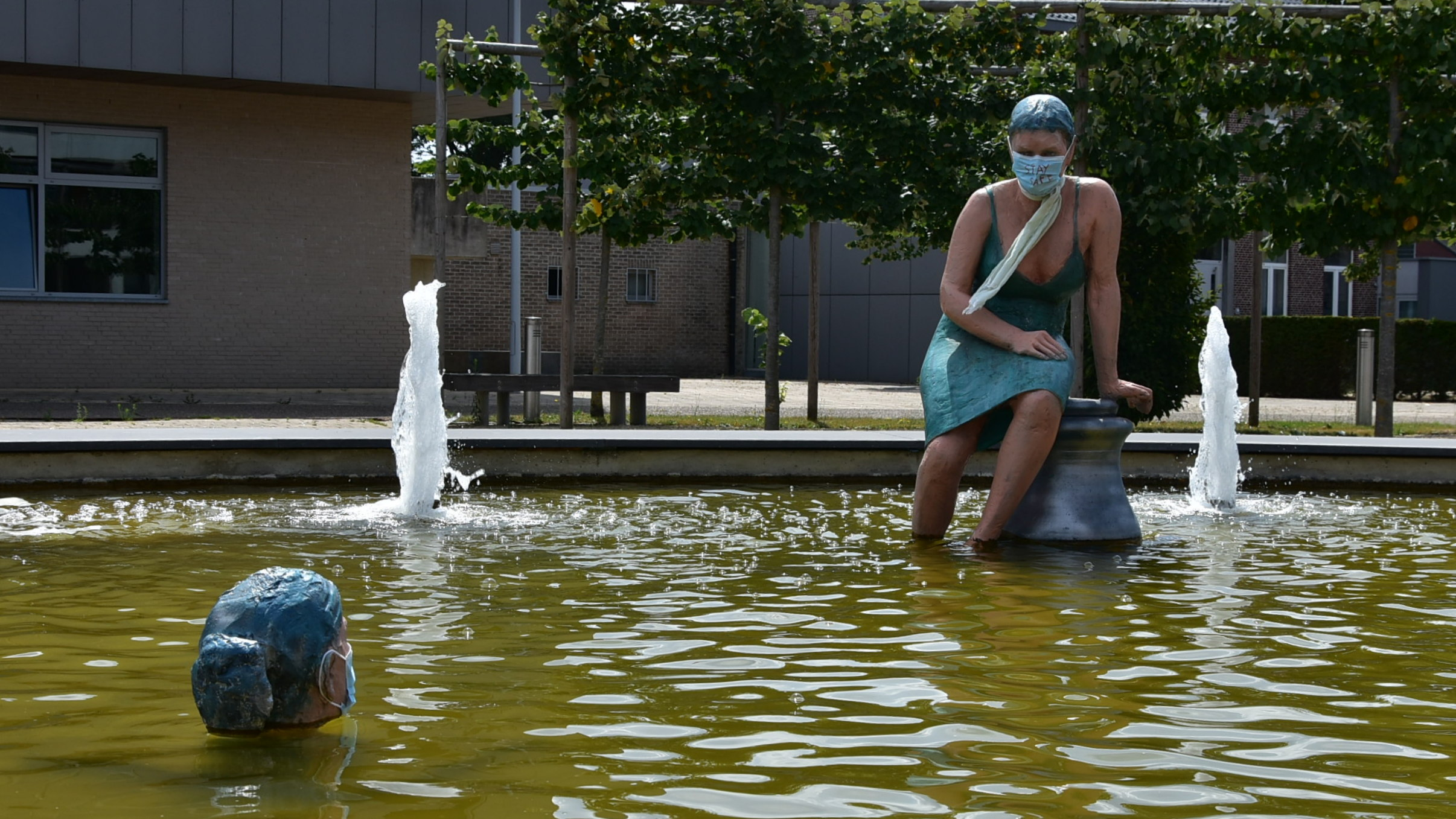
- Bathing Ladies

- Location in Belgium
- Coordinates: 51.10121°N 5.14839°E
- Country: Belgium
- Community: Flemish Community
- Province: Limburg
- Municipality: Ham

Area
  - Total: 16.34 km^{2} (6.31 sq mi)

Population (1976)
  - Total: 5,673
  - Density: 347.2/km^{2} (899.2/sq mi)
- Time zone: CET

Kwaadmechelen is a village in the Ham municipality of the Limburg province in the Flemish Community of Belgium. Kwaadmechelen was an independent municipality until 1977 when it merged into Ham.

== History ==
The area has been inhabited since prehistory. A Roman cemetery has been discovered near the village. Kwaadmechelen was first mentioned as Quaedmechelen in 1365. The village became an independent parish in the 16th century. In 1892, Exploitation des Procédés Raynaud, a chemical company nowadays known as Tessenderlo Chemie, was founded in Kwaadmechelen. In 1925, the railway line Diest - Beringen-Mijnen was extended with a station in Kwaadmechelen. The railway line closed for passengers in 1957, but remains in use as an industrial line. In 1977, Kwaadmechelen merged with Ham. Even though Kwaadmechelen was the biggest village, the new municipality was named Ham, because it was a former heerlijkheid ( landed estate).

== Nature ==
The nature reserve De Rammelaars is located near Kwaadmechelen. The reserve is named after the Dutch word for male rabbits due to the abundance of rabbits and hares in the area. In the 19th century, large parts of the Campine were transformed into agricultural land. De Rammelaars was remote and swampy and therefore remained untouched making it one of the few remaining authentic Campine landscapes.

== Gallery ==
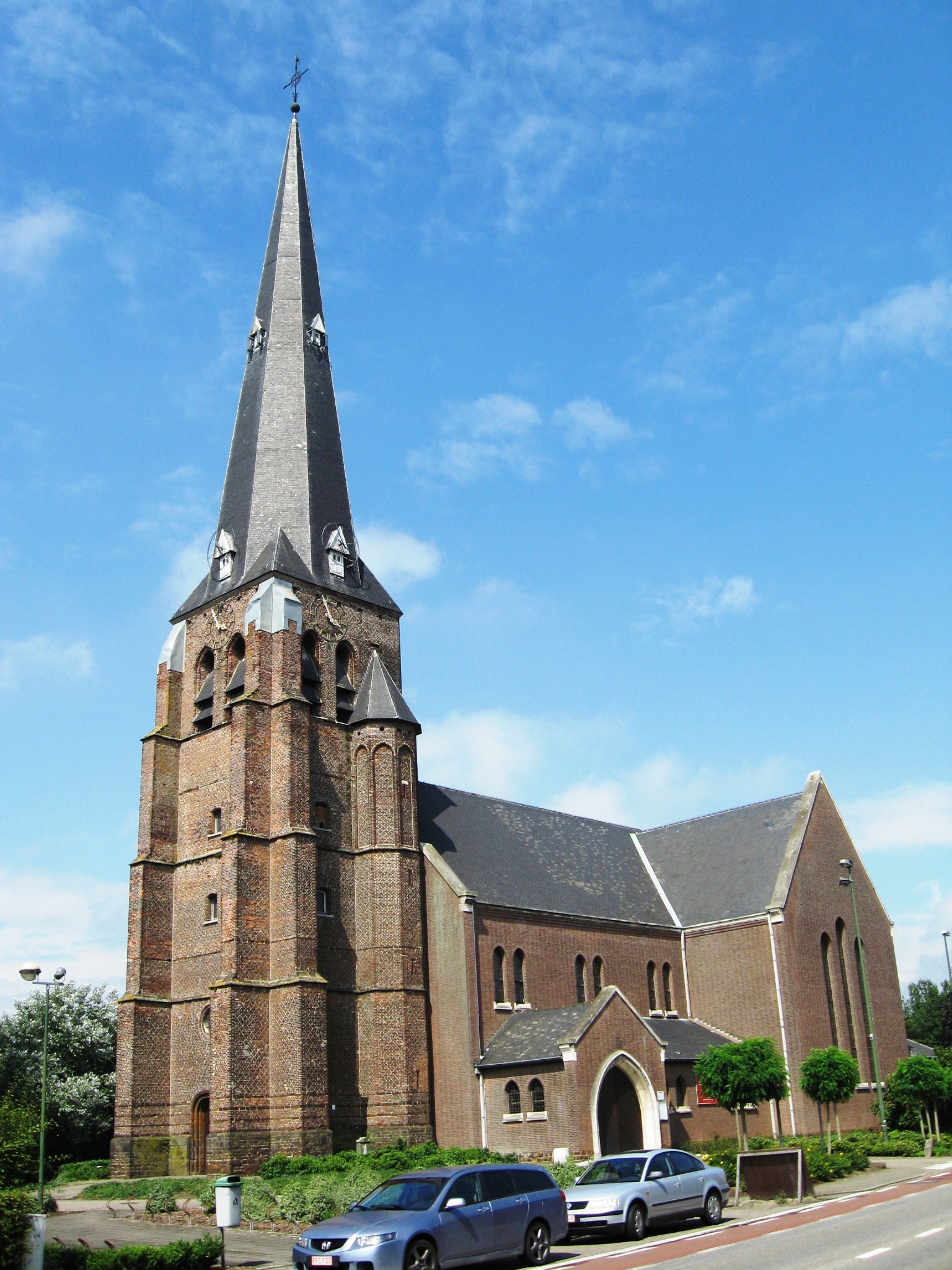
St Lambertus Church

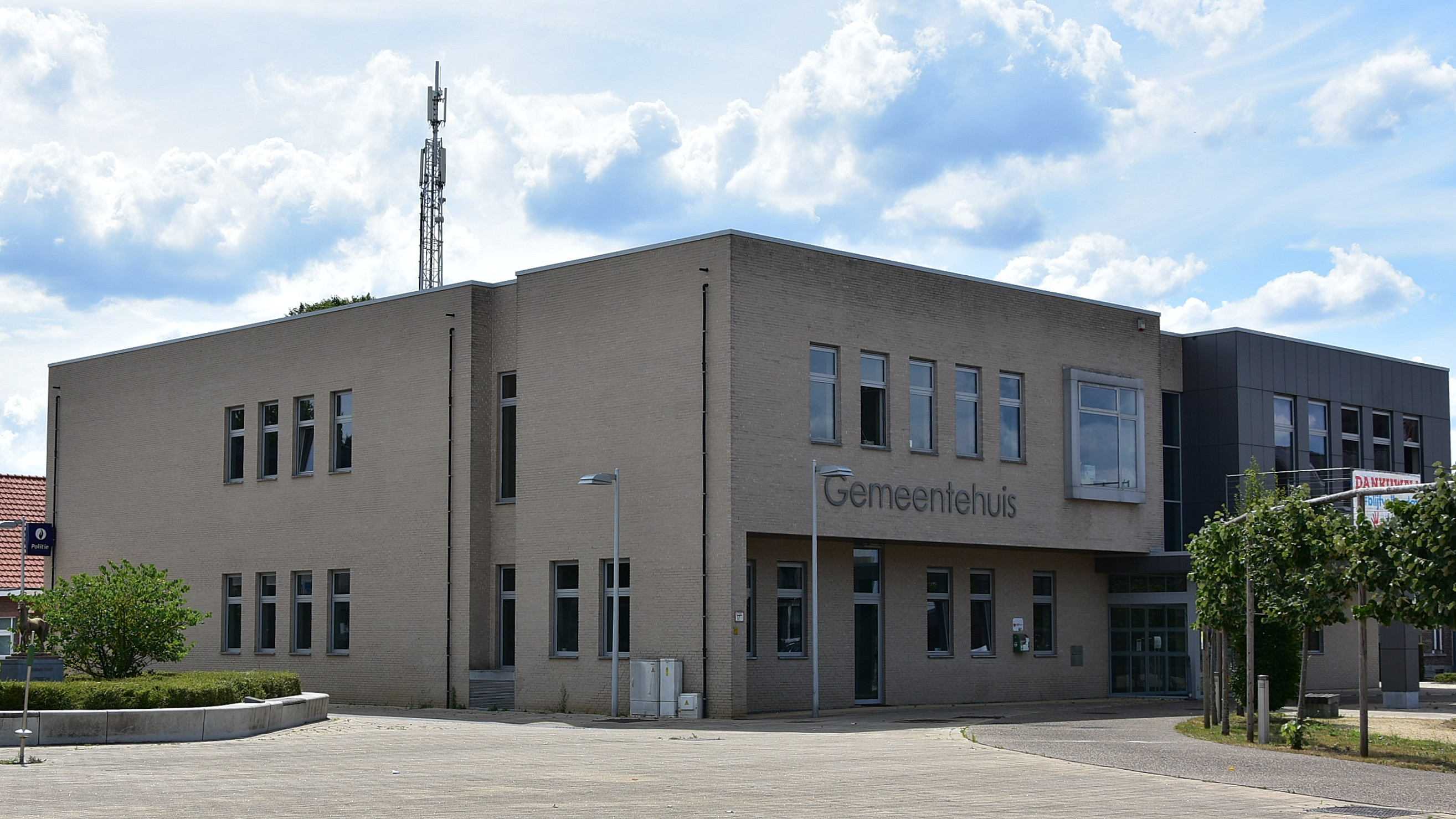
Town hall

== Notable people ==
- Lode Wouters (1929–2014), cyclist.
