= Åke Olivestedt =

Swedish cyclist

Personal information
- Born: 4 June 1924 Stockholm, Sweden
- Died: 28 June 1998 (aged 74) Stockholm, Sweden

Cycling career
- Sport: Cycling

Åke Olivestedt (4 June 1924 – 28 June 1998) was a Swedish cyclist. He competed in the individual and team road race events at the 1948 Summer Olympics.
