= Liévin Lerno =

Belgian cyclist

Medal record

Representing Belgium

Men's road bicycle racing

World Championships
Silver medal – second place	1948 Valkenburg	Amateur's Road Race

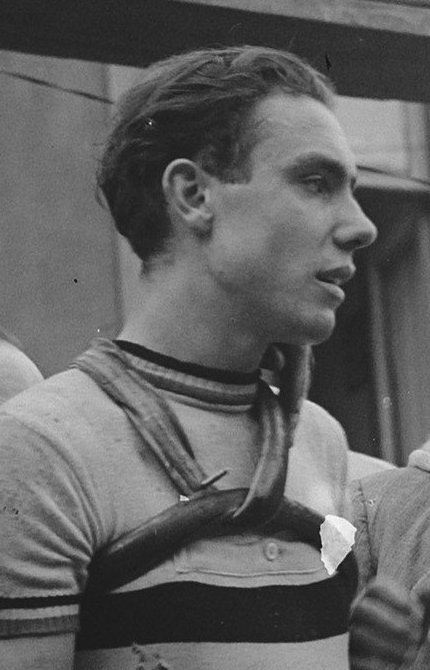

Liévin Lerno (3 October 1927 – March 2017) was a Belgian cyclist. He was born in Lokeren, East Flanders. He competed in the individual and team road race events at the 1948 Summer Olympics, winning a gold medal in the team event.
