= Olle Wänlund =

Swedish cyclist

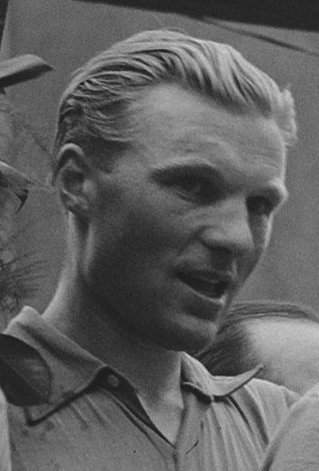
- Olle Wänlund (1948)

Personal information
- Born: 12 September 1923 Stockholm, Sweden
- Died: 11 January 2009 (aged 85) Stockholm, Sweden

Cycling career
- Sport: Cycling

Olle Wänlund (12 September 1923 – 11 January 2009) was a Swedish cyclist. He competed in the individual and team road race events at the 1948 Summer Olympics.
