= Ali Çetiner =

Turkish cyclist (born 1925)

Personal information
- Born: 5 July 1925
- Died: before 2008

Cycling career
- Sport: Cycling

Ali Çetiner (5 July 1925 – before 2008) was a Turkish cyclist. He competed in the individual and team road race events at the 1948 Summer Olympics.
