= Wendell Rollins =

American cyclist

Personal information
- Born: June 17, 1917 Salt Lake City, Utah, United States
- Died: December 8, 1990 (aged 73) Davis County, Utah, United States

Cycling career
- Sport: Cycling

Wendell Rollins (June 17, 1917 – December 8, 1990) was an American cyclist. He competed in the individual and team road race events at the 1948 Summer Olympics.
