= Jakob Schenk =

Swiss cyclist

Personal information
- Born: 31 March 1921 Zürich, Switzerland
- Died: 22 April 1951 (aged 30) Montreux, Switzerland

Cycling career
- Sport: Cycling
- Discipline: Road
- Role: Rider

Professional teams
- 1949: Fiorelli
- 1950: Rabeneick

Jakob Schenk (31 March 1921 – 22 April 1951) was a Swiss cyclist. He competed in the individual and team road race events at the 1948 Summer Olympics. He also rode in the 1949 Giro d'Italia, but did not finish.
