= Nils Johansson (cyclist) =

Swedish cyclist

Personal information
- Born: 16 April 1920 Borås, Sweden
- Died: 29 June 1999 (aged 79) Borås, Sweden

Cycling career
- Sport: Cycling

Nils Johansson (16 April 1920 – 29 June 1999) was a Swedish cyclist. He competed in the individual and team road race events at the 1948 Summer Olympics.
