= Ceferino Peroné =

Argentine cyclist

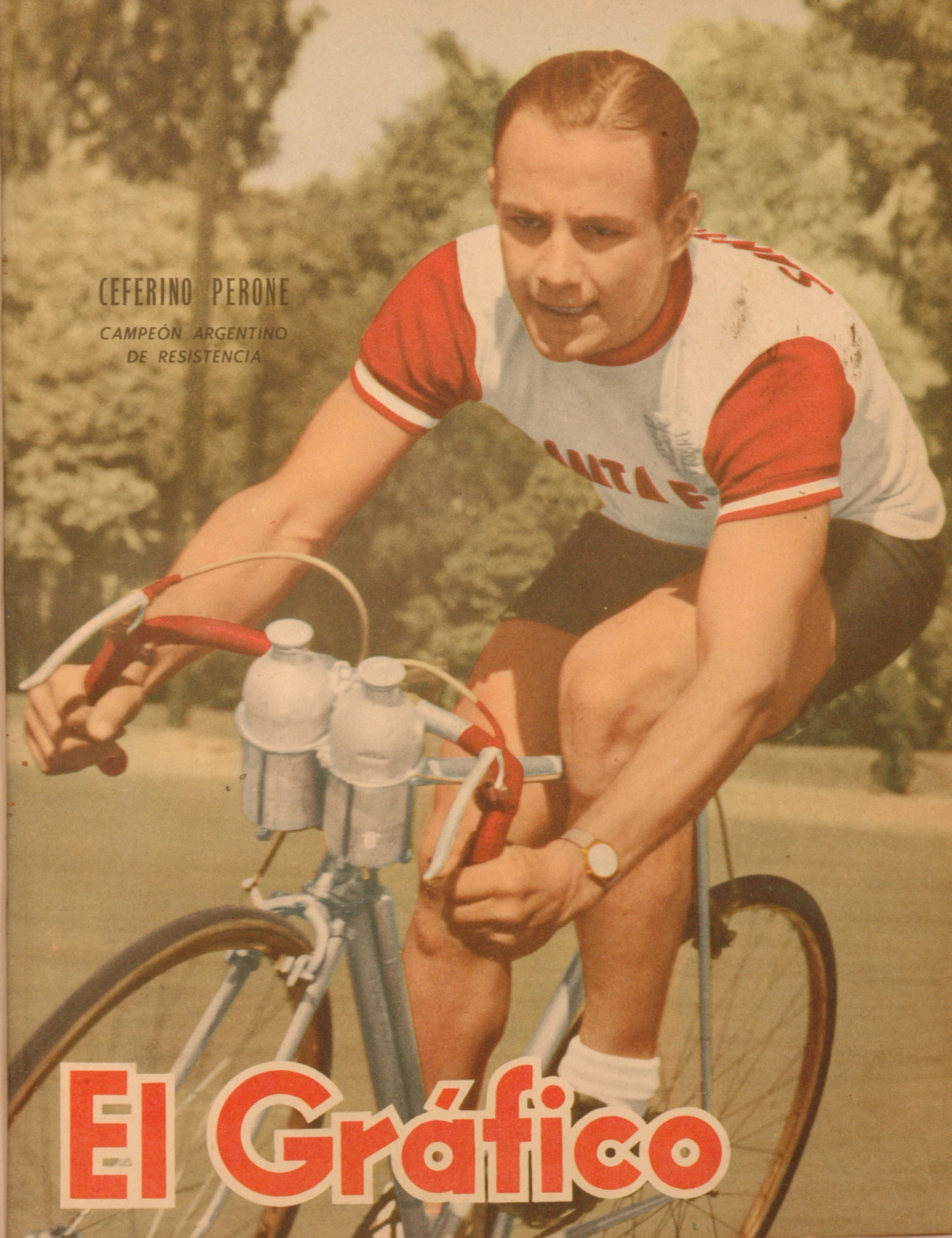

Personal information
- Born: 24 August 1925 San Justo, Santa Fé, Argentina
- Died: 14 September 2015 (aged 90)

Cycling career
- Sport: Cycling

Ceferino Peroné (24 August 1925 – 14 September 2015) was an Argentine cyclist. He competed in the individual and team road race events at the 1948 Summer Olympics. Padre de Cristina Lemercier
