= Placido Herrera =

Mexican cyclist

Personal information
- Full name: Placido Herrera
- Born: 5 October 1927
- Died: 22 November 2000 (aged 73)

Cycling career
- Sport: Cycling

Placido Herrera (5 October 1927 – 22 November 2000) was a Mexican cyclist. He competed in the individual and team road race events at the 1948 Summer Olympics.
