= Wally Rivers =

South African cyclist

Personal information
- Born: 24 April 1922 Bloemfontein, South Africa
- Died: 6 June 1998 (aged 76) Cape Town, South Africa

Cycling career
- Sport: Cycling

Wally Rivers (24 April 1922 – 6 June 1998) was a South African cyclist. He competed in the individual and team road race events at the 1948 Summer Olympics.
