= Walter Reiser =

Swiss cyclist (1923–2013)

Personal information
- Born: 29 December 1923 Frauenfeld, Switzerland
- Died: 21 August 2013 (aged 89)

Cycling career
- Sport: Cycling

Walter Reiser (29 December 1923 – 21 August 2013) was a Swiss cyclist. He competed in the individual and team road race events at the 1948 Summer Olympics. He also rode in the 1951 and the 1952 Tour de France.
