= Rudi Valenta =

Austrian cyclist

Personal information
- Born: 24 March 1921 Vienna, Austria
- Died: 15 July 2001 (aged 80)

Cycling career
- Sport: Cycling
- Discipline: Road
- Role: Rider

Professional teams
- 1948: Tebag
- 1949: Fiorelli
- 1950–1951: Bauer
- 1951: Garin–Wolber

Rudi Valenta (24 March 1921 – 15 July 2001) was an Austrian cyclist. He competed in the individual and team road race events at the 1948 Summer Olympics.

== Major results ==
1946
1st Vienna–Graz–Vienna
1947
2nd Vienna–Graz–Vienna
3rd Overall Tour of Austria
1949
2nd Road race, National Road Championships
2nd Vienna–Graz–Vienna
1950
1st Vienna–Graz–Vienna
1st Road race, National Road Championships
1951
1st Vienna–Graz–Vienna
2nd Bol d'Or
3rd Road race, National Road Championships
