= Hwang San-ung =

South Korean cyclist (1924–2012)

Personal information
- Born: 1924 Tanchon, Korea, Empire of Japan
- Died: 15 January 2012 (aged 87)

Cycling career
- Sport: Cycling

- Hwang San-ung
- Hangul: 황산웅
- Hanja: 黃山雄
- RR: Hwang Sanung
- MR: Hwang Sanung

Hwang San-ung (1924 – 15 January 2012) was a South Korean cyclist. He competed in the individual road race event at the 1948 Summer Olympics.
