= Florent Jodoin =

Canadian cyclist

Personal information
- Born: 24 December 1922 Varennes, Quebec, Canada
- Died: 9 March 2008 (aged 85)

Cycling career
- Sport: Cycling

Florent Jodoin (24 December 1922 – 9 March 2008) was a Canadian cyclist. He competed in the individual and team road race events at the 1948 Summer Olympics.
