= Mario Figueredo =

Uruguayan cyclist

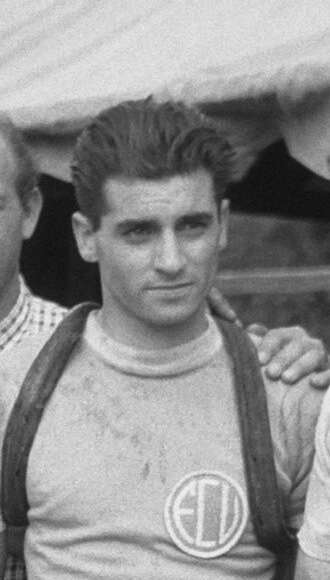
- Figueredo in 1948

Personal information
- Full name: Mario Adalberto Figueredo
- Born: 6 October 1926 Montevideo, Uruguay

Cycling career
- Sport: Cycling

Mario Figueredo (born 6 October 1926) was a Uruguayan cyclist. He competed in the individual and team road race events at the 1948 Summer Olympics.
