= Ian Scott (cyclist) =

British cyclist

Personal information
- Full name: Charles Stewart Ian Scott
- Born: 9 January 1915
- Died: 15 May 1980 (aged 65)

Cycling career
- Sport: Cycling
Medal record
Representing GBR
Men's cycling
Olympic Games
Silver medal – second place	London 1948	Team road race

Ian Scott (9 January 1915 – 15 May 1980) was a British cyclist. He won a silver medal in the team road race at the 1948 Summer Olympics in London, together with Bob Maitland, Gordon Thomas and Ernie Clements. He placed 16th in the individual road race.
