= Evert Grift =

Dutch cyclist

Personal information
- Born: 21 May 1922 Utrecht, Netherlands
- Died: 27 March 2009 (aged 86) Hilversum, Netherlands

Cycling career
- Sport: Cycling

Evert Grift (21 May 1922 – 27 March 2009) was a Dutch cyclist. He competed in the individual and team road race events at the 1948 Summer Olympics.

== See also ==
- List of Dutch Olympic cyclists
