= Valtin =

Valtin may refer to:

- Albert Valtin (1937–2015), Soviet basketball player
- Jan Valtin (1905–1951), alias of Richard Julius Hermann Krebs, German Soviet spy
- Le Valtin, commune in Lorraine, France
- Rolf Valtin (1925–2018), American soccer player
