= Lode Wouters =

Belgian cyclist

Personal information
- Born: 27 May 1929 Kwaadmechelen, Belgium
- Died: 25 March 2014 (aged 84) Geel, Belgium

Cycling career
- Sport: Cycling
Medal record
Men's cycling
Representing BEL
Olympic Games
| Gold medal – first place | 1948 London | Team road race |
| Bronze medal – third place | 1948 London | Individual road race |

Lode Alphonse Wouters (27 May 1929 – 25 March 2014) was a Belgian cyclist. He was born in Kwaadmechelen, Belgium. He competed for Belgium in the 1948 Summer Olympics held in London, United Kingdom in the individual road race event where he finished in third place. He also led the Belgian team of Léon Delathouwer and Eugène van Roosbroeck to the gold medal in the team road race. He died in March 2014 in Geel.
