= Aleksandar Strain =

Yugoslav cyclist

Personal information
- Born: 5 April 1919 Muggia, Italy
- Died: 15 December 1997 (aged 78)

Cycling career
- Sport: Cycling

Aleksandar Strain (5 April 1919 – 15 December 1997) was a Yugoslav cyclist. He competed in the individual and team road race events at the 1948 Summer Olympics. He also competed in Italy under the name Antonio Strain.
