= René Rouffeteau =

French cyclist

Personal information
- Born: 30 March 1926 Saint-Denis, France
- Died: 27 April 2012 (aged 86) Cannes, France

Cycling career
- Sport: Cycling

René Rouffeteau (30 March 1926 – 27 April 2012) was a French cyclist. He competed in the individual and team road race events at the 1948 Summer Olympics.
