= Gordon Thomas (cyclist) =

British cyclist

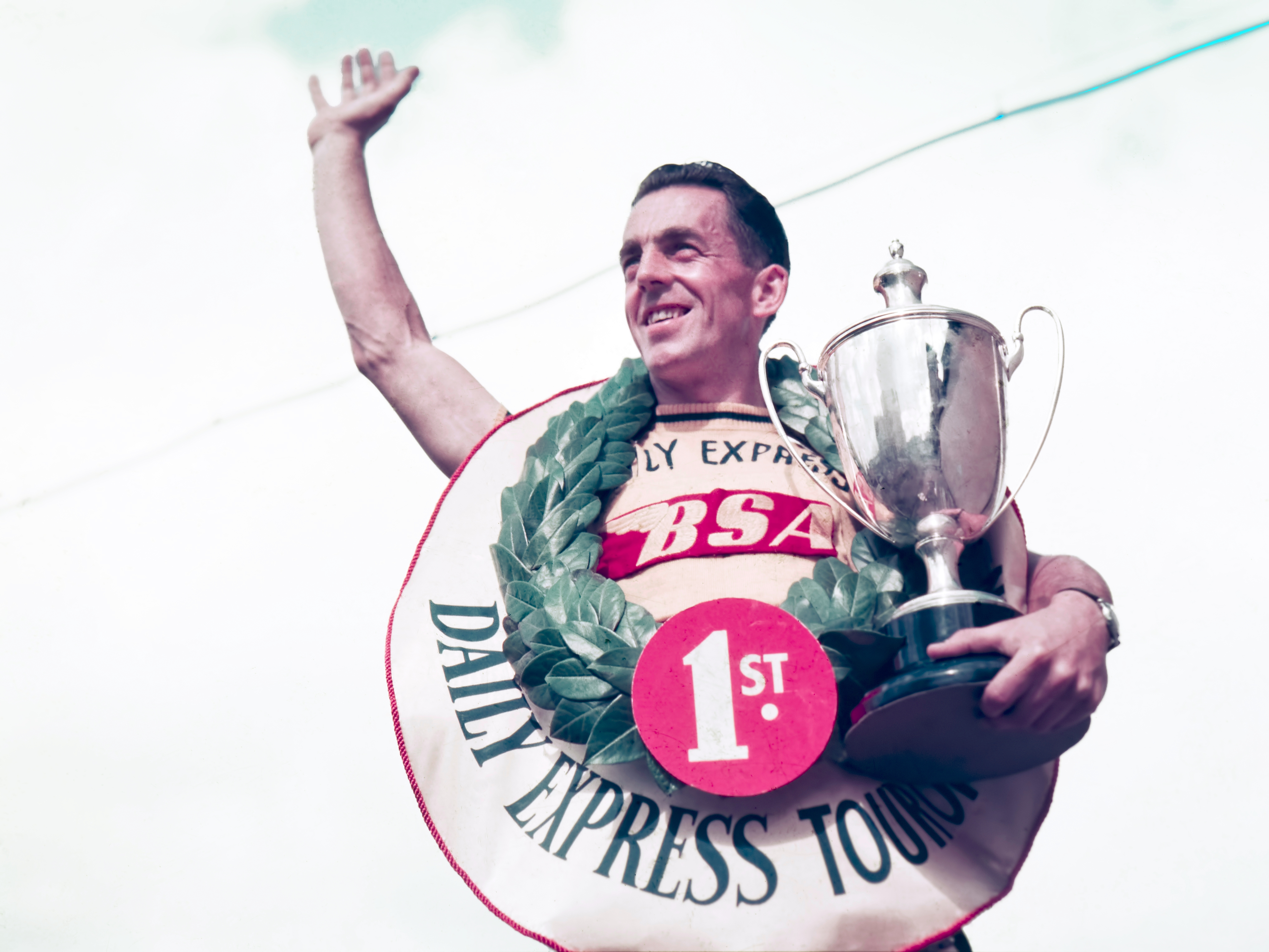
- Receiving the 1953 Tour of Britain cup

Personal information
- Born: 18 August 1921 Shipley, West Yorkshire, England
- Died: 10 April 2013 (aged 91) Peterborough, England

Cycling career
- Sport: Cycling
Medal record
Representing GBR
Men's cycling
Olympic Games
Silver medal – second place	London 1948	Team road race

Gordon W. "Tiny" Thomas (18 August 1921 – 10 April 2013) was a British cyclist who competed at the 1948 Summer Olympics in London. There he won a silver medal in the team road race alongside Bob Maitland and Ian Scott. He also competed in the individual event, finishing 8th in a field of 101 participants. Born in Shipley, West Riding of Yorkshire, he served during World War II with the Royal Artillery in Africa and Italy. After his Olympic experience, he went on to win the 1953 Tour of Britain before retiring from cycling to enter the wool business.
