= Rogelio Salcedo =

Chilean cyclist

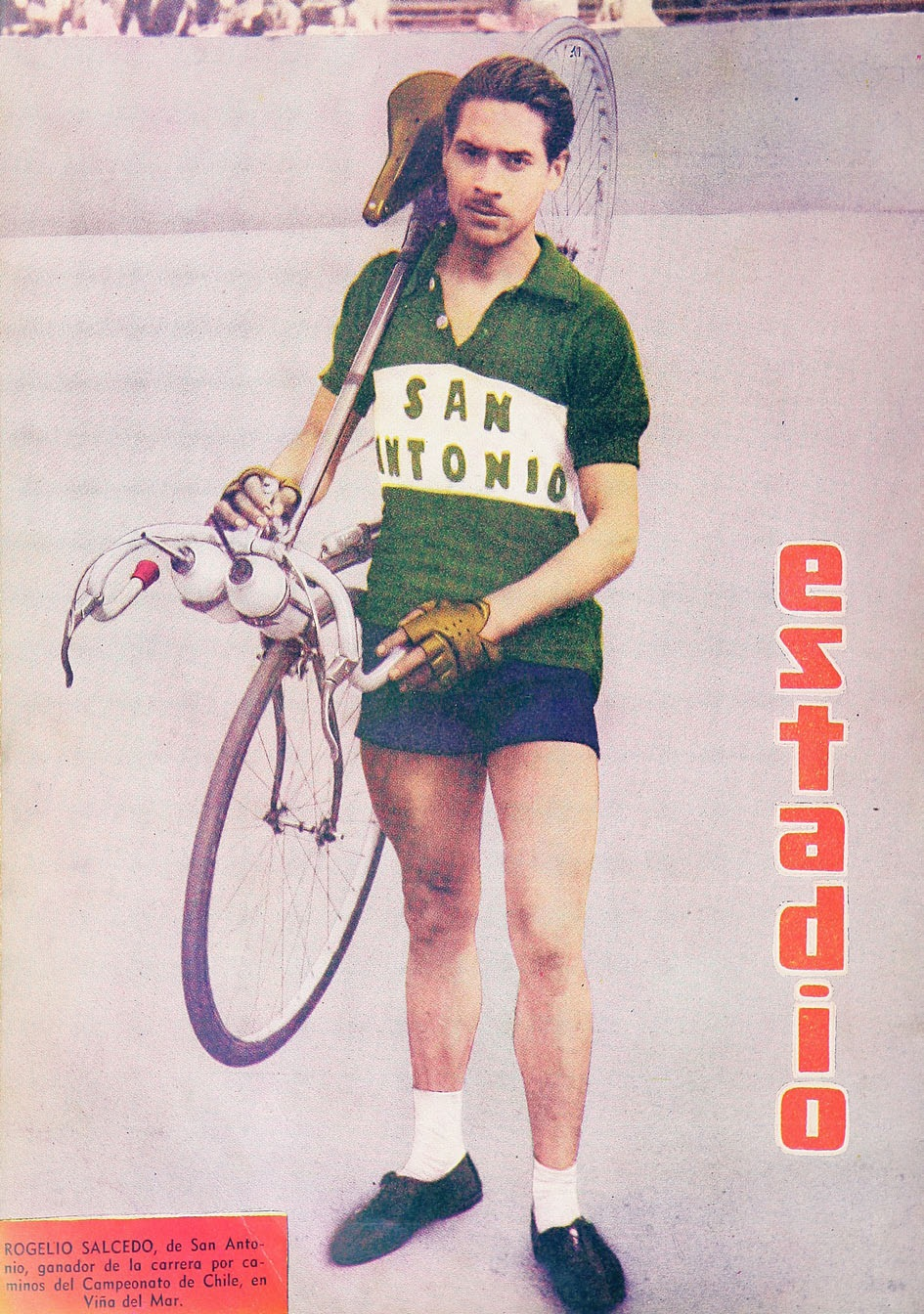

Personal information
- Born: 15 April 1925 San Antonio, Chile
- Died: 23 January 1955 (aged 29)

Cycling career
- Sport: Cycling

Rogelio Salcedo (15 April 1925 – 23 January 1955) was a Chilean cyclist. He competed in the individual and team road race events at the 1948 Summer Olympics.
