= Ignacio Cruzat =

Chilean sports shooter

Personal information
- Born: 3 August 1913
- Died: 14 March 1977 (aged 63)

Sport
- Sport: Sports shooting

Ignacio Cruzat (3 August 1913 – 14 March 1977) was a Chilean sports shooter. He competed at the 1948 Summer Olympics and 1956 Summer Olympics.
