= Miguel Sevillano =

Argentine cyclist

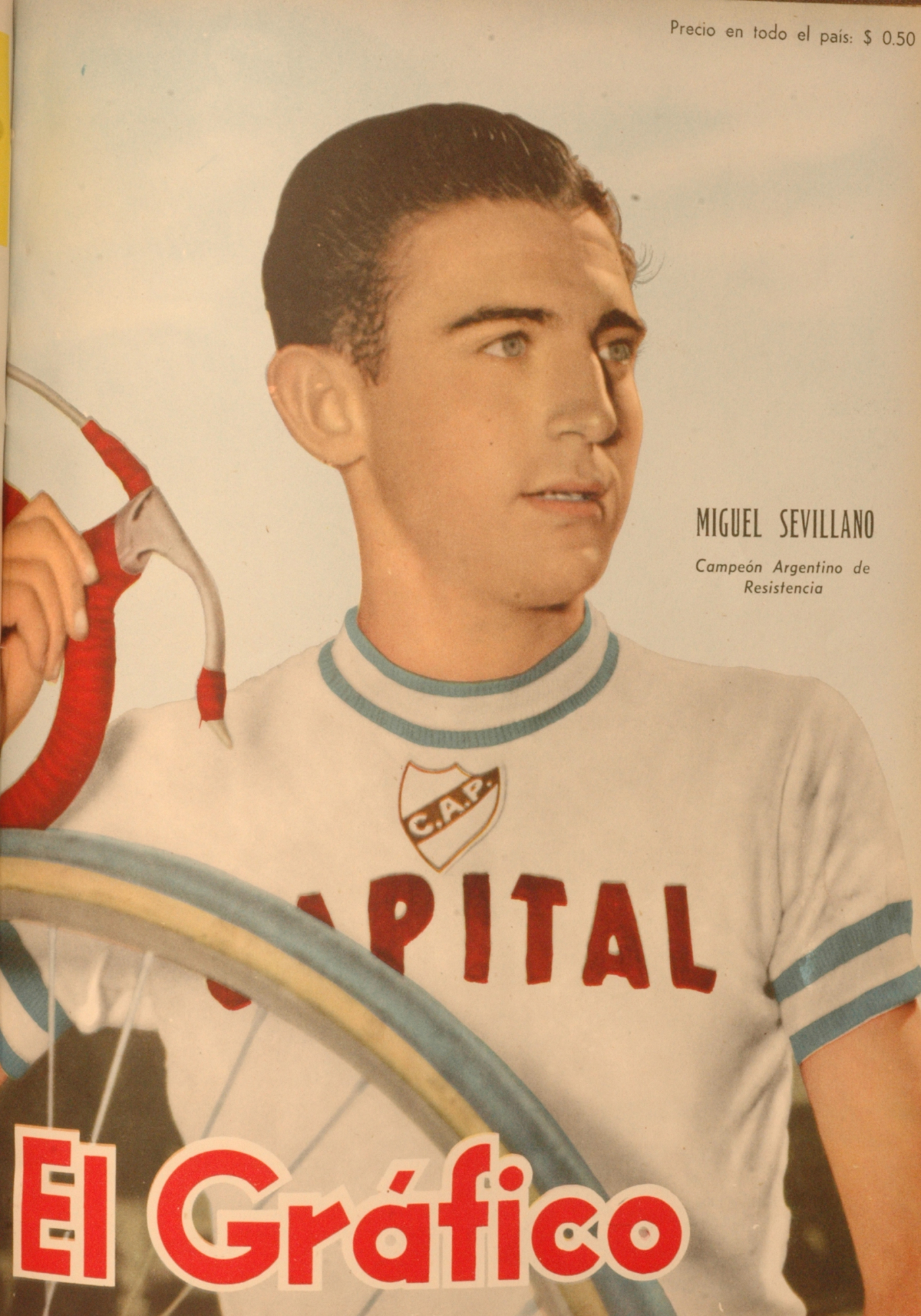

Personal information
- Born: 16 October 1928 Buenos Aires, Argentina
- Died: 3 November 1998 (aged 70) Buenos Aires, Argentina

Cycling career
- Sport: Cycling

Miguel Sevillano (16 October 1928 – 3 November 1998) was an Argentine cyclist. He competed in the individual and team road race events at the 1948 Summer Olympics.
