= Leon De Lathouwer =

Belgian cyclist

Personal information
- Born: 19 September 1929 Wetteren, Belgium
- Died: 7 August 2008 (aged 78) Kalken, Belgium

Cycling career
- Sport: Cycling
Medal record
Representing Belgium
Men's cycling
Olympic Games
Gold medal – first place	1948 London	Team road race

Leon De Lathouwer (19 September 1929 – 7 August 2008) was a Belgian road cyclist. He won a gold medal in the team road race at the 1948 Summer Olympics in London, together with Lode Wouters and Eugène Van Roosbroeck, and placed fourth in individual road race. The same year he won the Tour of Belgium as amateur. In the early 1950s, he turned professional and won several local races before retiring in 1959. He was the Flemish champion in 1948, 1949, 1953 and 1955.
