= Exequiel Ramírez =

Chilean cyclist

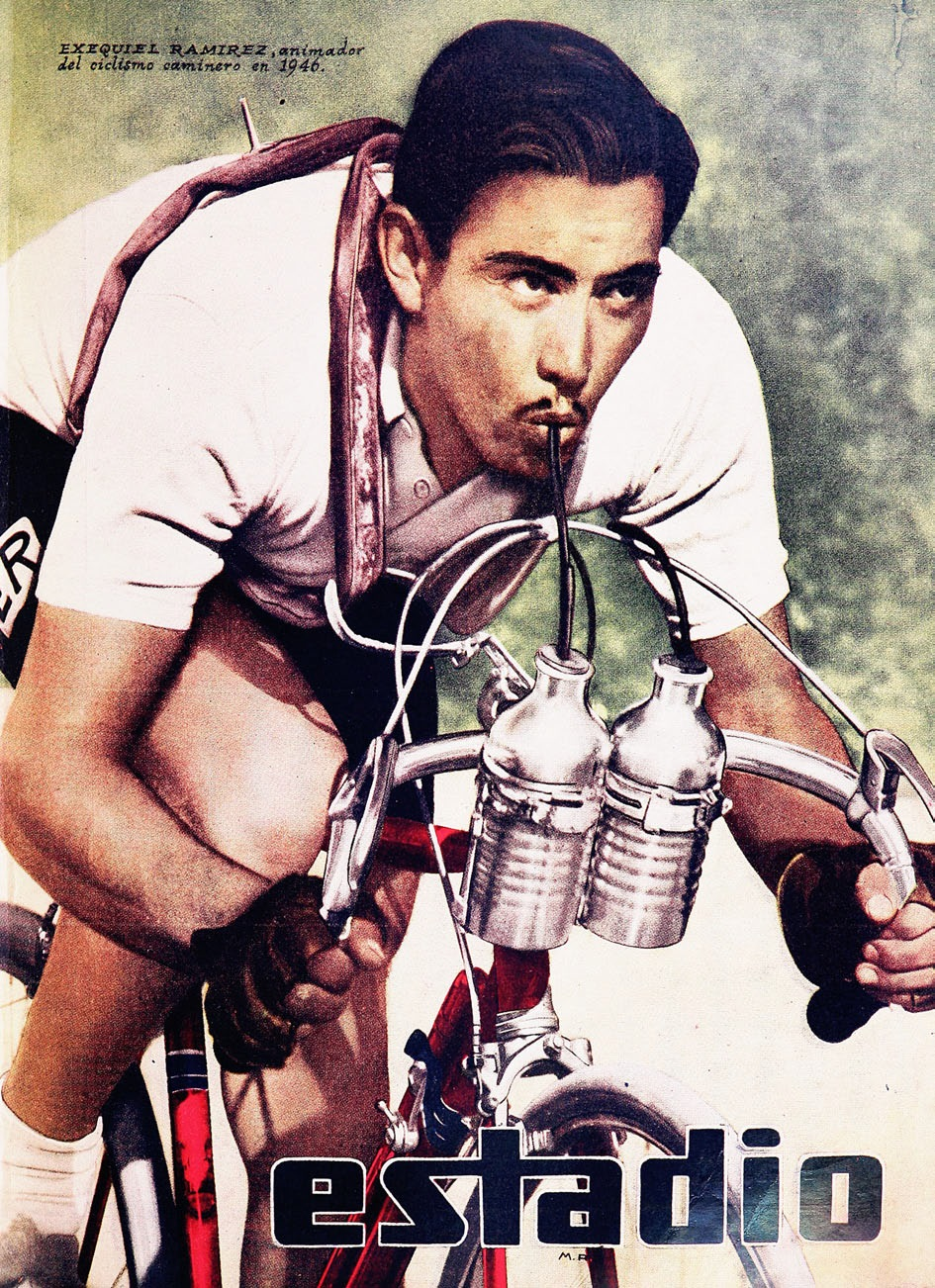

Personal information
- Born: 20 September 1924 Santiago, Chile
- Died: 9 May 2000 (aged 75)

Cycling career
- Sport: Cycling

Exequiel Ramírez (20 September 1924 – 9 May 2000) was a Chilean cyclist. He competed in the individual and team road race events at the 1948 Summer Olympics.
