= Rachel Holzer =

Australian theatre actress and director

Rachel Holzer

Rachel Holzer (Yiddish: רחל האָלצער; 1899 – November 14, 1998) was an internationally acclaimed Australian Jewish theatre actress and director.

== Life ==
Holzer was born in 1899 in Kraków, Poland. Her parents were Anna Holzer (née Blatt), a homemaker, and Ignacy (Isaac) Holzer, a house painter who led the local Yiddish Workers’ Union.

When she was six years old, Holzer appeared in an amateur production of Di Emese Kraft, a play by the Russian American playwright Jacob Gordin. The experience inspired her to become a professional actress.

Holzer attended Krakow Polish Drama School, graduating in 1925. She performed as a leading actress with the Polish National Theatre and in Yiddish theatre throughout Poland.

Holzer and her husband, playwright Chaim Rozenstein, arrived in Melbourne in April 1939 as part of a world tour. After Germany's invasion of Poland, Holzer elected to remain in Australia, where she would live the rest of her life. She had a successful career as an actress and director in Australian theatre, often performing at the Dovid (David) Herman Theatre in Melbourne.

One of her best-known performances came in 1966, when she recited a Yiddish version of the poem Babi Yar for an audience of 6,000 people, including its author, visiting Soviet poet Yevgeny Yevtushenko. Her performance, which evoked the voices of mothers whose children were murdered by the Nazis near Kiev, was described as "electrifying" and visibly moved the audience.

Holzer retired in 1977. She died in Melbourne on November 14, 1998, at the age of 99.
