= Dirkie Binneman =

South African cyclist

Personal information
- Born: 8 September 1918
- Died: 25 June 1959 (aged 40) Western Cape, South Africa

Cycling career
- Sport: Cycling

Dirkie Binneman (8 September 1918 – 25 June 1959) was a South African cyclist. He competed in the individual and team road race events at the 1948 Summer Olympics.
