= Doris Niles =

American dancer (1905–1998)

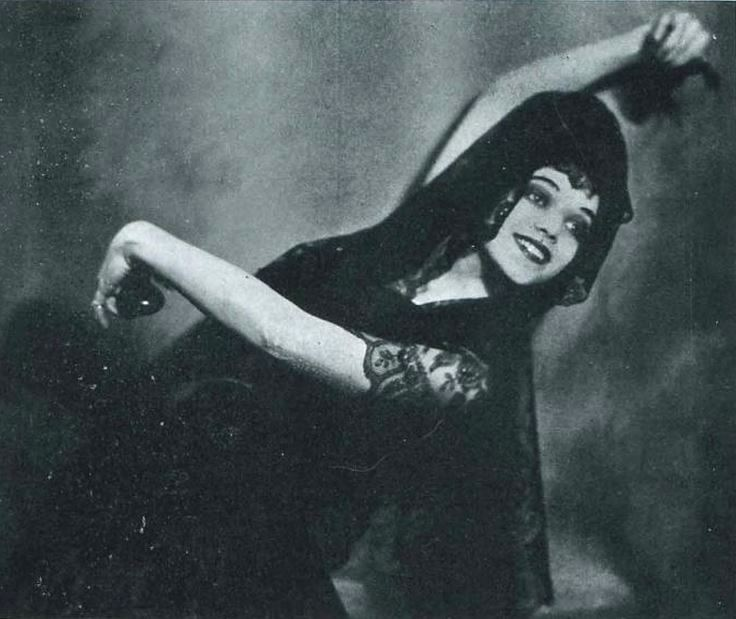
- Doris Niles, from a 1922 issue of Broadway Brevities
- Born: Doris Jones; May 20, 1905; Redlands, California U.S.
- Died: November 15, 1998 (aged 93); Santa Paula, California U.S.
- Occupation: Dancer
- Years active: 1921-1961
- Spouse: Serge Leslie

Doris Niles (née Jones; May 20, 1905 – November 15, 1998) was an American dancer.

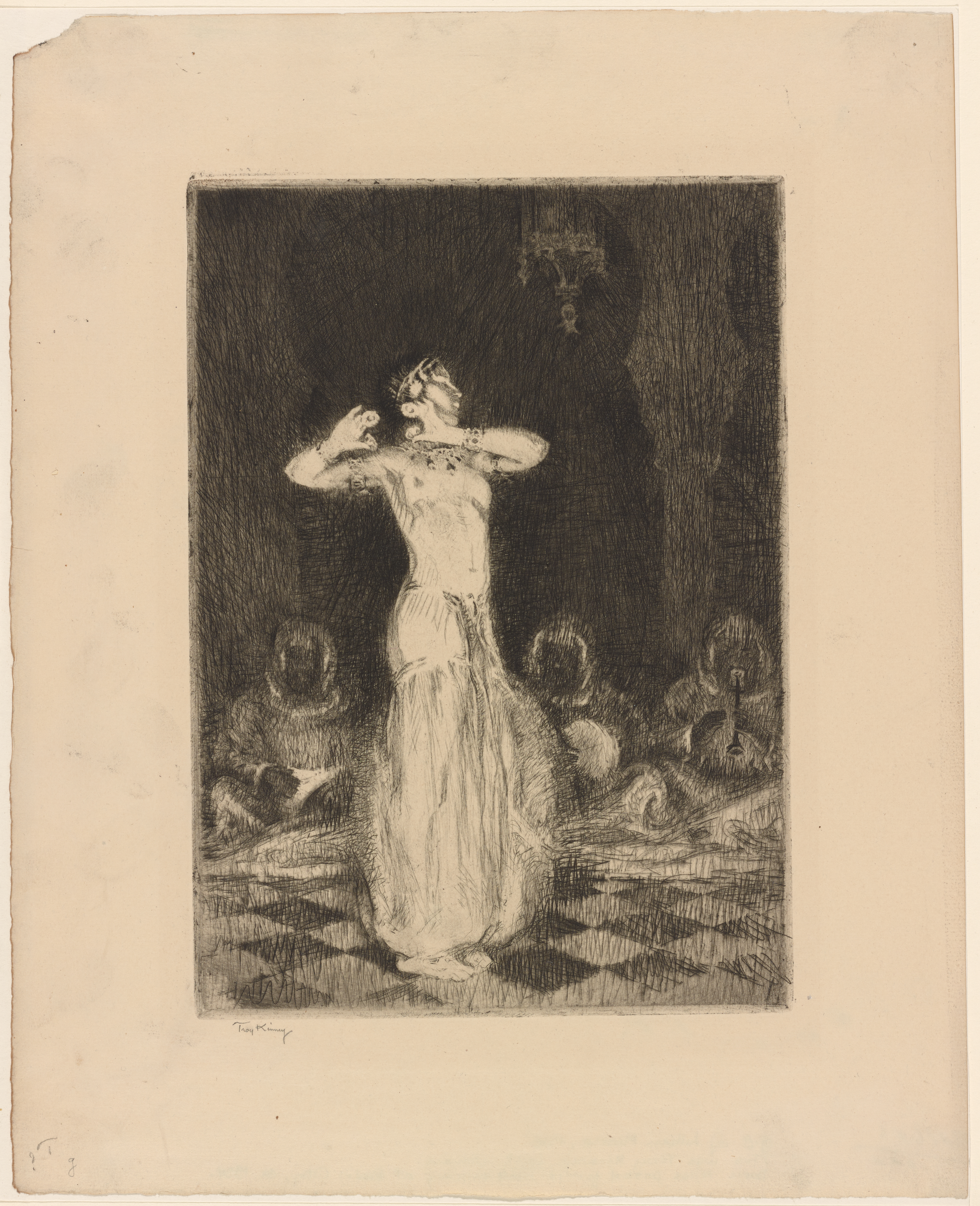
Doris Niles at Radio City, 1930 (NYPL b12145900-5238038)

== Early life ==
Niles was born in Redlands, California, the daughter of banker Charles R. Jones. Her younger sister Cornelia Niles also pursued a dance career, and taught dance at Cornish College of the Arts in Seattle.

== Career ==
When she was 17 years old, Niles was hired as a dancer at the Capitol Theatre in New York City. She soon specialized in "exotic" dances meant to evoke Asian cultures, in spectacles choreographed by Alexander Oumansky. She and her sister danced recitals together in 1926–1927, including two at Carnegie Hall. At 22, she went to Spain, to study Spanish dance. She soon performed for King Alfonso XIII and Queen Victoria Eugenia. Though her company toured in the United States in 1928–1929, she stayed mainly in Europe, performing and learning until 1940, when the hazards of World War II sent her home to the United States. In 1928 she wrote a syndicated series of essays that appeared in American newspapers, "How to Grow Graceful".

She continued working as a dancer and teaching dance, mainly in Los Angeles, until her retirement after 1961. In 1963 she choreographed a production of Turandot for the Redlands Bowl. She was admired for her beauty and extravagant costumes as well as for her dance steps.

== Dance library ==
Niles and her husband collected an extensive library of books on dance. They sold the collection in 1971 to a library in Stuttgart.

== Personal life ==
Niles married her dance partner, fellow American Willis "Serge" Leslie, in 1930, in Paris.

She died in Santa Paula, California on November 15, 1998, aged 94 years.

== Publications ==
- A bibliography of the dance collection of Doris Niles & Serge Leslie, 1966
