= Adolfo Ferrari =

Italian cyclist (1924–1998)

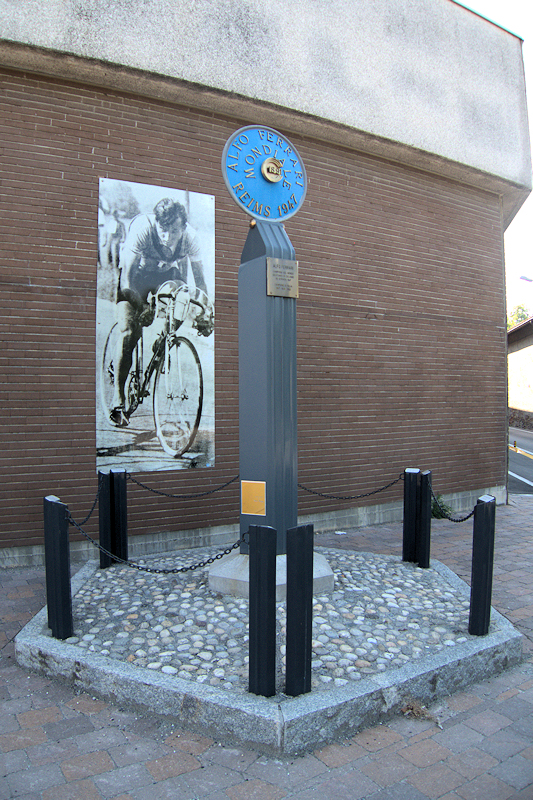
- Monument to Alfo Ferrari in Sospiro

Personal information
- Born: 20 September 1924 Sospiro, Italy
- Died: 29 November 1998 (aged 74) Sospiro, Italy

Cycling career
- Sport: Cycling

Adolfo Ferrari (20 September 1924 – 29 November 1998) was an Italian cyclist. He competed in the individual and team road race events at the 1948 Summer Olympics.
