= Roberto Müller =

Chilean sports shooter (1902–1984)

Personal information
- Born: 6 October 1902 Santiago, Chile
- Died: 21 March 1984 (aged 81) Santiago, Chile

Sport
- Sport: Sports shooting

Roberto Müller (6 October 1902 – 21 March 1984) was a Chilean sports shooter. He competed at the 1936 Summer Olympics and 1948 Summer Olympics. Müller died in Santiago on 21 March 1984, at the age of 81.
