= Renato Iturrate =

Chilean cyclist (1922–2021)

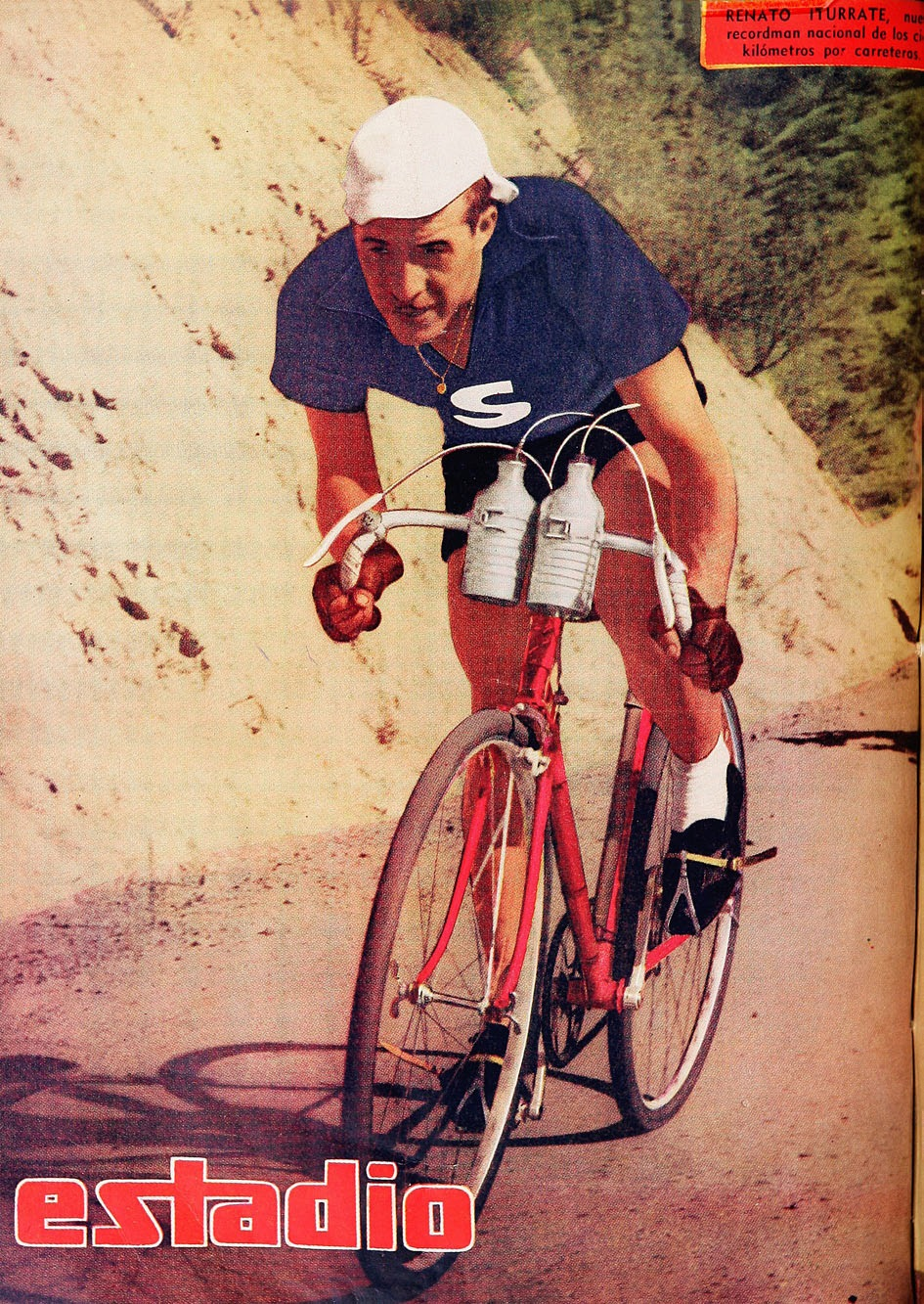

Personal information
- Full name: Hector Renato Iturrate Azócar
- Born: 20 March 1922 Los Ángeles, Chile
- Died: 7 June 2021 (aged 99) Santiago, Chile

Cycling career
- Sport: Cycling

Hector Renato Iturrate Azócar (20 March 1922 – 7 June 2021) was a Chilean cyclist. He competed in the individual and team road race events at the 1948 Summer Olympics. He later married track athlete Eliana Gaete.
