= Enrique Accorsi =

Chilean fencer

Personal information
- Born: 22 September 1916 Concepción, Chile
- Died: 28 April 1990 (aged 73)

Sport
- Sport: Fencing

Enrique Benito Accorsi Teuthorn (22 September 1916 – 28 April 1990) was a Chilean fencer. He competed in the individual foil and épée events at the 1948 Summer Olympics.
