= Andrés Neubauer =

Chilean fencer

Personal information
- Born: 17 April 1908
- Died: 9 February 1992 (aged 83)

Sport
- Sport: Fencing

Andrés Neubauer (17 April 1908 – 9 February 1992) was a Chilean fencer. He competed in the individual sabre event at the 1948 Summer Olympics.
