= Chester Nelsen Jr. =

American cyclist (1922–2018)

Chester Nelsen
Personal information
- Born: August 2, 1922 St. Louis, Missouri, United States
- Died: December 25, 2018 (aged 96) Elsberry, Missouri, United States

Cycling career
- Sport: Cycling

Alfred Chester Nelsen Jr. (August 2, 1922 – December 25, 2018) was an American cyclist. He competed in the individual and team road race events at the 1948 Summer Olympics.
