= Jack Hoobin =

Australian cyclist (1927–2000)

Personal information
- Full name: John Patrick Hoobin
- Born: 23 June 1927 Dagenham, London, England
- Died: 10 June 2000 (aged 72) Tweed Heads, New South Wales, Australia

Cycling career
- Sport: Cycling

John "Jack" Hoobin (23 June 1927 – 10 June 2000) was an Australian cyclist who competed in the individual road race at the 1948 Summer Olympics. He also won in the amateur division at the 1950 UCI Road World Championship.
