= Gabino Rodríguez (cyclist) =

Mexican cyclist (1927–1998)

Personal information
- Full name: Gabino Rodríguez
- Born: 1927
- Died: 25 August 1998 (aged 70–71)

Cycling career
- Sport: Cycling

Gabino Rodríguez (1927 – 25 August 1998) was a Mexican cyclist. He competed in the individual and team road race events at the 1948 Summer Olympics.
