= Eugène Van Roosbroeck =

Belgian cyclist (1928–2018)

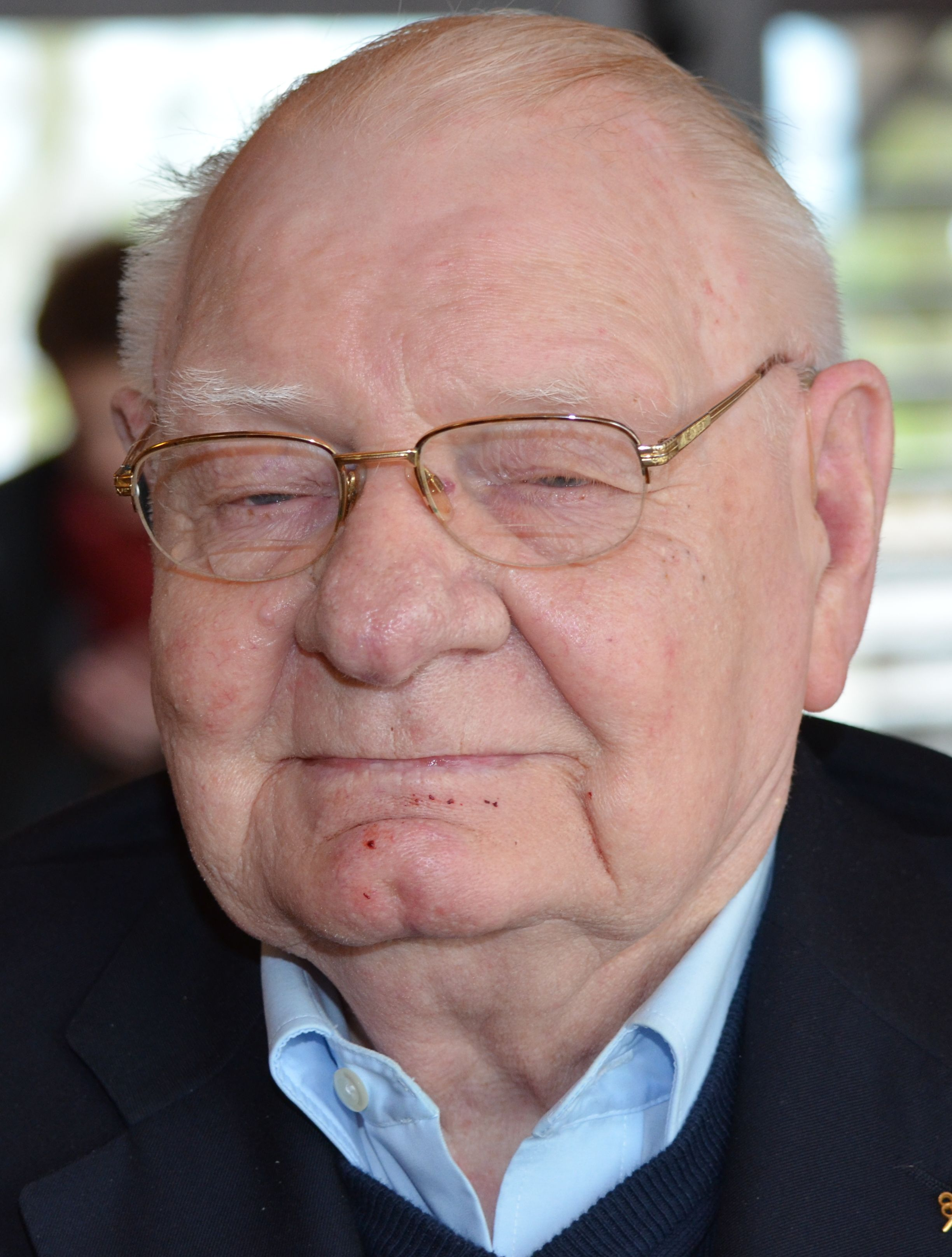

Personal information
- Born: 13 May 1928 Noorderwijk, Belgium
- Died: 28 March 2018 (aged 89) Noorderwijk, Belgium

Cycling career
- Sport: Cycling
Medal record
Representing BEL
Men's cycling
Olympic Games
Gold medal – first place	London 1948	Team road race

Eugène Van Roosbroeck (13 May 1928 – 28 March 2018) was a Belgian racing cyclist from Noorderwijk (Antwerp province). He won a gold medal in team road race at the 1948 Summer Olympics in London, together with Lode Wouters and Leon De Lathouwer.

After that Olympic race, the Belgian cyclists were not aware that there was a team competition, and returned to Belgium, missing the medal ceremony. Many years later, Van Roosbroeck heard that André Nelis was given a copy of his lost medal, and requested the Belgian Olympic Committee to get the medal that he never received, and was given one in 2010.
