= José Beyaert =

French cyclist (1925–2005)

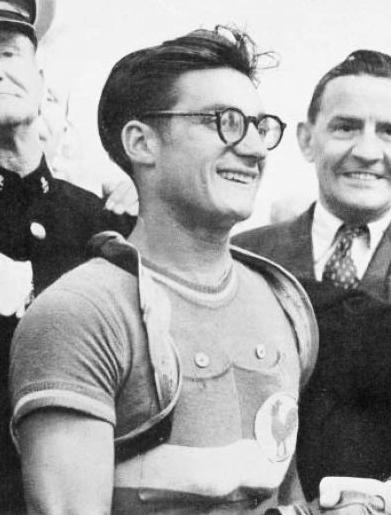
- Beyaert after winning the road race at the 1948 Summer Olympics

Personal information
- Born: 1 October 1925 Lens, Pas-de-Calais, France
- Died: 11 June 2005 (aged 79) La Rochelle, France

Cycling career
- Sport: Cycling
- Discipline: Road

Professional teams
- 1949: Gitane–Campagnolo
- 1949–1951: Helyett–Hutchinson
- 1952: Colomb–Dunlop
Medal record
Representing FRA
Men's cycling
Olympic Games
| Gold medal – first place | 1948 London | Individual road race |
| Bronze medal – third place | 1948 London | Team road race |

José Beyaert (1 October 1925 – 11 June 2005) was a French professional cyclist who competed during the 1940s and 1950s, and was the 1948 Olympics road race champion. Beyaert moved to Colombia in 1952 and lived there for several years where he was the coach to the national cycling team. He also competed in the Vuelta a Colombia which he won on his first attempt in 1952. He finished second the following year and eighth the year after. He also rode in the 1950 Tour de France and finished 47th overall.

== Major results ==
1945
3rd Paris–Évreux
1948
Summer Olympics

1st Road race
3rd Team time trial

3rd Trofeo Matteotti
1949
1st GP de l'Echo d'Alger
1950
1st Grand Prix d'Isbergues
9th Paris–Brussels
1952
1st Overall Vuelta a Colombia

1st Stages 2, 3, 6, 11 & 13

1953
2nd Overall Vuelta a Colombia

1st Stages 3 & 8

1955
1st Stages 8a, 8b & 17 Vuelta a Colombia
