= Lorang Christiansen =

Norwegian cyclist

Personal information
- Born: 22 January 1917 Oslo, Norway
- Died: 2 February 1991 (aged 74) Oslo, Norway

Cycling career
- Sport: Cycling

Lorang Christiansen (22 January 1917 – 2 February 1991) was a Norwegian cyclist. He competed at the 1948 and 1952 Summer Olympics. His best finish was a 28th place in the road race in 1952. He represented the club Sagene IF.
