= Knud Andersen (cyclist) =

Danish cyclist

Personal information
- Full name: Knud Andersen
- Born: 5 January 1922 Copenhagen, Denmark
- Died: 14 November 1997 (aged 75) Nakskov, Denmark

Cycling career
- Sport: Cycling

Knud Andersen (5 January 1922 – 14 November 1997) was a Danish cyclist. He competed at the 1948 and 1952 Summer Olympics.
