= Leif Flengsrud =

Norwegian cyclist

Personal information
- Born: 18 September 1922 Vang, Hedmark, Norway
- Died: 24 August 2009 (aged 86) Vang, Hedmark, Norway

Cycling career
- Sport: Cycling

Leif Flengsrud (18 September 1922 – 24 August 2009) was a Norwegian cyclist.

He was born in Vang Municipality in Hedmark county, and he represented the club Hamar IL. He participated in the 1948 Summer Olympics but did not finish the road race. He was the first Olympic cyclist from his region. He also competed in the World Championships in the same year.

His father Olaf and brother Oddvar were cyclists as well. His father had opened a bike shop in 1920, and Flengsrud later spent his working life in this shop. He also continued as a hobby sportsman well into his seventies and eighties. He died in August 2009 in Hamar.

== Results ==
| Event | Team | Result | Sport |
|---|---|---|---|
| London 1948 | Norway | DNF | Road Race, Individual |
