= Paul Backman =

Finnish cyclist (1920–1995)

Personal information
- Born: 3 December 1920 Raseborg, Finland
- Died: 17 March 1995 (aged 74) Helsinki, Finland

Cycling career
- Sport: Cycling

Paul Backman (3 December 1920 – 17 March 1995) was a Finnish cyclist. He won the Finnish national road race title in 1946. He also competed at the 1948 and 1952 Summer Olympics.
