= August Prosenik =

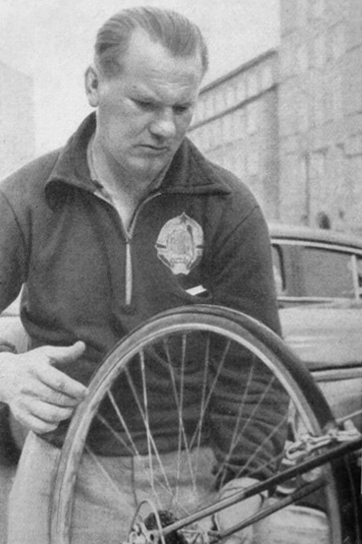
- Prosenik at the 1948 Peace Race

Personal information
- Born: 25 April 1916 Obrežje, Brežice, Austria-Hungary
- Died: 22 July 1975 (aged 59) Zagreb, SFR Yugoslavia

Cycling career
- Sport: Cycling

Amateur teams
- 1936–40: Sokol Zagreb
- 1945–48: Dinamo Zagreb

August Prosenik (25 April 1916 – 22 July 1975) was a Yugoslav amateur road cyclist. He competed in the individual and team events at the 1936 and 1948 Summer Olympics and placed 12th individually in 1936. He won the Tour of Romania in 1946 and the Peace Race in 1948.

Prosenik grew up in a poor family, as his father became disabled after a mining accident. In 1930 he moved to Zagreb and worked there as a workshop mechanic and then as a car mechanic. After retiring from competitions he became a cycling coach and a sports administrator.
