= Bob Maitland =

English cyclist (1924–2010)

Personal information
- Full name: Robert John Maitland
- Born: 31 March 1924 Birmingham, England
- Died: 26 August 2010 (aged 86) Metz, France
- Height: 5 ft 7 1/2 in (171 cm)
- Weight: 154 lb (70 kg)

Cycling career
- Sport: Cycling
- Discipline: Road
- Role: Rider

Amateur team
- -: Solihull CC, Concorde RCC

Professional teams
- 1953: B.S.A. Cycles
- 1954–1955: Hercules Cycles
- 1956–1957: Individual (Unknown)
- 1958: Maitland Cycles

Major wins
- 1948, 1953 national road championships; 1945, 1949 national hill-climb championship UK national tandem record for 50 miles (80km)
Medal record
Men's road bicycle racing
Representing Great Britain
Olympic Games
Silver medal – second place	1948 London	Team road race

Robert John Maitland (31 March 1924 – 26 August 2010) was a British racing cyclist. He won national championships in Britain, tackled long-distance records, was the best-placed British rider in the 1948 Olympic road race, and rode for Britain in the Tour de France. His career coincided with a civil war within British cycling as two organisations, the National Cyclists Union and the British League of Racing Cyclists, fought for the future of road racing.

== Early career ==
Maitland was born in Birmingham and developed an interest in cycle-racing in his teens. He collected autographs from pre-war riders such as Eddie Larkin and Charles Holland and sometimes cycled out to watch them ride time-trials, which were then the only cycle races held on the road. (Note: The National Cyclists Union had banned racing on the road in the 19th century, fearing that police reaction would affect cyclists generally. A rebel organisation, the Road Time Trials Council, as it came to be known, resisted the ban by riding lone races against the clock, in secret, out in the countryside, and soon after dawn. The NCU and RTTC soon came to recognise each other but they resisted the arrival of the British League of Racing Cyclists, which in defiance of both began organising races on the open road during the war. See British League of Racing Cyclists for more.) Spectating persuaded him to race. His first race was the Birmingham Time Trial Association 25-mile event. He finished in 1h 13m 22s, 10 minutes slower than the winner. He won a junior race in Warwickshire, near Birmingham in 1939 and the following year joined the Solihull Cycling Club.He started racing seriously in 1941.

His first road race was over 30 miles near Nottingham in 1943, on a hilly course and in the rain. He gained 40 seconds on the field but another rider caught him with two of the 28 laps to go and he finished second.

Maitland was an engineer, a reserved occupation in Britain during the second world war. (Note: A reserved occupation was one considered essential to keep the country running. Its workers weren't sent to war.) That meant he could continue racing, although with a reduced calendar of competitions and restrictions on travel. He rode club events but also set a national tandem record for 50 miles (80 km) with Dick Bowes. He rode his first massed-start event in 1943, finishing sixth after 30 miles (50 km).

== Success ==
In 1944 and 1946 he came third in the NCU's national road championship, then won in 1948. That same year, Maitland won a silver medal as a member of the British road race team at the 1948 Summer Olympics. Other members were Ian Scott and Gordon Thomas. Maitland finished third in the NCU's national road championship once more in 1949.

By 1952, Maitland had joined the British League of Racing Cyclists. He came second in its independent road championship (Note: Independents were riders in a category between amateur and professional, able to ride with either but not both at the same time. The category, which was recognised at first in Britain only by the British League of Racing Cyclists, was intended to be a stepping stone to full professionalism or a chance to revert to amateur riding if racing with professionals proved unsuccessful. The class was abandoned by the Union Cycliste Internationale in 1964.) in 1952 and the champion in 1953. But as a member of the BLRC and an independent or semi-professional, he was no longer eligible to compete at the Olympics.

In 1958, Maitland rode for his own cycling team, Maitland Cycles. Arthur Ilsley was also a member.

== Olympic Games ==
The Olympic Games in 1948 were in London, the cycling road race held at Windsor. Maitland was best-placed of the British team. He said:

Our manager was a guy called Frank Slemen, who was a Liverpool butcher. He knew nothing about road racing and he admitted it. We had to sign on a day before the race and any other manager would have insisted the other teams go to the British camp, not the other way round. So we went to the signing-on by bus and we all got seats except for one of our riders, who had to stand. Frank could see the officials on the bus all had seats. So he went to a Dutch official and said his rider was having to stand and asked this guy to give up his seat. Now, Frank was the strongest guy I've known and when the Dutchman hesitated, he grabbed him by the lapels, lifted him two feet in the air and dropped him on the floor. (Bob Maitland)

Maitland finished sixth and won a medal as member of the second team. He finished four seconds behind the winner, José Beyaert of France. The organisers of the Games reported:

[Gordon] Thomas (Great Britain) tried a breakaway on the penultimate lap, between Ascot and Blacknest Gates, and he was chased by L. Delathouiwer (Belgium). The pair held a 15 second lead as they climbed Breakheart Hill and finished the lap. But with five miles still to go, the group were gaining fast, and as they caught the leaders, all the riders eased in readiness for the sprint which seemed certain to decide the race. J. Beyaert made his first real effort at Ascot gate, but, led by J. Hoobin, the group regained contact. The decisive moment was not, however, to be in the final sprint at all. A short distance before the top of Breakheart Hill, and with over half a mile to go, Beyaert again sprinted into the lead and opened up a gap of at least eight lengths which was too much for any of his rivals, all of whom seemed more tired than the winner at the finish... Great Britain had two riders among the leading group, R. Maitland and G. Thomas, and C.S.I. Scott came in sixteenth to gain the second team award.

== Tour de France ==
Maitland rode for Britain in the 1955 Tour de France - the race was then competed by national teams - in a team selected by cycling journalists because the civil war between the National Cyclists Union and the British League of Racing Cyclists made it impossible to leave the job to either. The team was a mixture of full professionals and riders like Maitland, who were independents. It was divided largely between those who normally rode for the Hercules professional team and others like Maitland who rode for the rival BSA. Sending them was not universally seen as a good idea. The journalist Ken Bowden write in Cycling: "We cannot send a team to the Tour unless we are willing to gamble heavily with men's reputations, our future in the race, and Britain's sporting prestige. Any rider we could send in 1955 could know more about the Tour than what he had read, heard, or imagined. It would fall far short of reality, for the Tour is unique in terrain, weather variation, racing technique and a hundred and one other things."

The writer, Tim Hilton, said: "None of the British cyclists had experienced one of the northern spring classics, so they had no idea that the Tour could be so much harder and faster than the races they had known. The early stages were a shock. And then, between Roubaix and Namur, the British had the jolting first experience of the northern French and Belgian roads. One by one they left the race."

The team were numbers 31 to 40 - Dave Bedwell, Tony Hoar, Stan Jones, Fred Krebs, Maitland, Ken Mitchell, Bernard Pusey, Brian Robinson, Ian Steel and Bev Wood. Pusey went on stage two, Wood on stage three with Bedwell. Jones quit on stage seven, Steel on stage eight, Maitland on stage nine, and Krebs and Mitchell in the mountains on stage 11. Just two got to Paris: Robinson 29th at 1h 57m 10s and Hoar as lanterne rouge at 6h 6m 1s.

The author William Fotheringham wrote:

They were, says Maitland, not a happy team, more 'a lot of individuals put together, just a shambles.' Not all the squad would share his opinion, but it is clear that tensions arose from the fact that he and Cozens, (Note: Syd Cozens, was the British team manager in the 1955 Tour de France) a former star of the winter six-day track races, had been brought in from BSA, Hercules' bitter rivals in domestic racing. There were factions within the team: Maitland and Tony Hoar did not see eye to eye, nor did Brian Robinson and Syd Cozens, while Jones and Krebs just did not get on.

== Veteran career ==
Maitland later became a member of the League of Veteran Racing Cyclists and a masters world champion at the 1989 UCI road world championships in the 65–69 category.

== Assessment ==
The magazine, The Bicycle, said of him: "It is one thing to have a near-perfectly developed body, capable of the highest tests of human endurance, but the brain of that body must be tuned accordingly, able to dictate and control physical behaviour. And who can doubt that, so far as cycling is concerned, Bob Maitland, national mass start champion in 1949, is one of the shrewdest riders in the game?" He died on 26 August 2010 in Metz, France.

== Palmarès ==
1944
3rd British National Road Race Championships (NCU)

1945
1st British National Hill Climb Championships

1946
3rd British National Road Race Championships (NCU)

1948
2nd Team road race, 1948 Summer Olympics
6th Individual road race, 1948 Summer Olympics
1st British National Road Race Championships (NCU)

1949
1st British National Hill Climb Championships
3rd British National Road Race Championships (NCU)

1952
2nd British National Road Race Championships (BLRC independent)
3rd overall Tour of Britain

3rd Stage 10, Tour of Britain, Newcastle
3rd Stage 14 Tour of Britain, London

1953
1st British National Road Race Championships (BLRC independent)

1954
3rd British National Road Race Championships (BLRC independent)
