= Turkey at the 1948 Summer Olympics =

- IOC code: TUR
- NOC: Turkish National Olympic Committee

in London
- Competitors: 58 in 7 sports
- Flag bearer: Muharrem Candaş
- Medals Ranked 7th: Gold 6 Silver 4 Bronze 2 Total 12

Summer Olympics appearances (overview)
- 1908; 1912; 1920; 1924; 1928; 1932; 1936; 1948; 1952; 1956; 1960; 1964; 1968; 1972; 1976; 1980; 1984; 1988; 1992; 1996; 2000; 2004; 2008; 2012; 2016; 2020; 2024; 2028

Other related appearances
- 1906 Intercalated Games

Turkey competed at the 1948 Summer Olympics in London, England. 58 competitors, 57 men and one woman, took part in 42 events in seven sports.

== Medalists ==
Medal	Name	Sport	Event	Date
Gold	Nasuh Akar	Wrestling	Men's freestyle bantamweight	31 July
Gold	Gazanfer Bilge	Wrestling	Men's freestyle featherweight	31 July
Gold	Celal Atik	Wrestling	Men's freestyle lightweight	31 July
Gold	Yasar Dogu	Wrestling	Men's freestyle welterweight	31 July
Gold	Ahmet Kireççi	Wrestling	Men's Greco-Roman heavyweight	6 August
Gold	Mehmet Oktav	Wrestling	Men's Greco-Roman featherweight	6 August
Silver	Halit Balamir	Wrestling	Men's freestyle flyweight	31 July
Silver	Adil Candemir	Wrestling	Men's freestyle middleweight	31 July
Silver	Kenan Olcay	Wrestling	Men's Greco-Roman flyweight	6 August
Silver	Muhlis Tayfur	Wrestling	Men's Greco-Roman middleweight	6 August
Bronze	Ruhi Sarıalp	Athletics	Men's triple jump	3 August
Bronze	Halil Kaya	Wrestling	Men's Greco-Roman bantamweight	6 August

== Cycling ==
Four cyclists, all male, represented Turkey in 1948

Individual road race

- Ali Çetiner
- Mustafa Osmanlı
- Orhan Suda
- Talat Tunçalp

Team road race

- Ali Çetiner
- Mustafa Osmanlı
- Orhan Suda
- Talat Tunçalp

== Fencing ==
Six fencers, all men, represented Turkey in 1948.

Men's foil

- Nihat Balkan
- Nejat Tulgar

Men's sabre

- Sabri Tezcan
- Rıza Arseven
- Merih Sezen

Men's team sabre

- Merih Sezen, Nihat Balkan, Rıza Arseven, Sabri Tezcan, Vural Balcan

== Wrestling ==
Men's freestyle

Athlete	Event	Round 1	Round 2	Round 3	Round 4	Round 5	Round 6	Round 7	Rank
Halit Balamir	Flyweight	Viitala (FIN); L 1–2	Baudric (FRA); W 3–0	Johansson (SWE); W Fall	Raeisi (IRI); W 3–0	Bye	—N/a		2nd place, silver medalist(s)
Nasuh Akar	Bantamweight	May (CAN); W Fall	Wenger (SUI); W 3–0	Persson (SWE); W 3–0	Trimpont (BEL); W Fall	Kouyos (FRA); W Fall	Leeman (USA); W Fall	—N/a	1st place, gold medalist(s)
Gazanfer Bilge	Featherweight	Saadian (IRI); W Fall	Tóth (HUN); W Fall	Jouaville (FRA); W Fall	Moore (USA); W Fall	Hietala (FIN); W Fall	Bye	Sjölin (SWE); W 3–0	1st place, gold medalist(s)
Celal Atik	Lightweight	Koll (USA); W Fall	Singh (IND); W Fall	Ries (RSA); W Fall	Leppänen (FIN); W 3–0	Nizzola (ITA); W Fall	Frändfors (SWE); W Fall	—N/a	1st place, gold medalist(s)
Yaşar Doğu	Welterweight	Bhargava (IND); W Fall	Zandi (IRI); W Fall	Moustafa (EGY); W Fall	Sóvári (HUN); W Fall	Bye	Merrill (USA); W 3–0	Garrard (AUS); W Fall	1st place, gold medalist(s)
Adil Candemir	Middleweight	Arthur (AUS); W Fall	Vachon (CAN); W 2–1	Bowey (GBR); W Fall	Brand (USA); L Fall	Bye	—N/a		2nd place, silver medalist(s)
Muharrem Candaş	Light heavyweight	Istaz (BEL); W 3–0	Mellavuo (FIN); W 3–0	Bye	Stöckli (SUI); L 1–2	Wittenberg (USA); L Fall	Did not advance		4
Sadik Esen	Heavyweight	Antonsson (SWE); L 0–3	Lardon (SUI); W 3–0	Bye	Armstrong (AUS); L Fall	Did not advance			4

Men's Greco-Roman

Athlete	Event	Round 1	Round 2	Round 3	Round 4	Round 5	Round 6	Rank
Kenan Olcay	Flyweight	Clausen (NOR); W 3–0	Thomsen (DEN); W 3–0	Abdel-El (EGY); W Fall	Szilágyi (HUN); L 1–2	Bye	Lombardi (ITA); L 1–2	2nd place, silver medalist(s)
Halil Kaya	Bantamweight	Arenzana (FRA); W Fall	Biris (GRE); W Fall	Bencze (HUN); L 0–3	Bye	Hassan (EGY); L 0–3	Did not advance	3rd place, bronze medalist(s)
Mehmet Oktav	Featherweight	Bye	Talosela (FIN); W 3–0	Anderberg (SWE); W Fall	Kandil (EGY); W 3–0	Weidner (AUT); W 2–1	Bye	1st place, gold medalist(s)
Ahmet Şenol	Lightweight	Falaux (FRA); W 2–1	Myland (GBR); W Fall	Damage (LBN); L 0–3	Freij (SWE); L Fall	Did not advance		6
Ali Özdemir	Welterweight	Männikkö (FIN); L 0–3	Retired					16
Muhlis Tayfur	Middleweight	Groot (NED); W 3–0	Bolzi (ARG); W Fall	Vogel (AUT); W Fall	Kinnunen (FIN); L 0–3	Bye	Grönberg (SWE); L 0–3	2nd place, silver medalist(s)
Mustafa Avcioğlu-Çakmak	Light heavyweight	Ramírez (ARG); W 3–0	Nilsson (SWE); L 0–3	Richmond (GBR); L Fall	Did not advance			8
Ahmet Kireççi	Heavyweight	Inderbitzin (SUI); W Fall	Nilsson (SWE); W Fall	Kangasniemi (FIN); W 3–0	Bye	Fantoni (ITA); W 3–0	—N/a	1st place, gold medalist(s)
