= Iran at the 1948 Summer Olympics =

- IOC code: IRI (IRN used at these Games)
- NOC: National Olympic Committee of Iran

in London, England
- Competitors: 36 in 5 sports
- Flag bearer: Mostafa Baharmast
- Medals Ranked 34th: Gold 0 Silver 0 Bronze 1 Total 1

Summer Olympics appearances (overview)
- 1900; 1904–1936; 1948; 1952; 1956; 1960; 1964; 1968; 1972; 1976; 1980–1984; 1988; 1992; 1996; 2000; 2004; 2008; 2012; 2016; 2020; 2024; 2028

Iran competed at the Summer Olympic Games for the first time at the 1948 Summer Olympics in London, England. 36 competitors, all men, took part in 23 events in 5 sports. The country's sole medal was a weightlifting bronze won in the featherweight division by Jafar Salmasi.

Iranian fencer Freydoun Malkom had competed at the 1900 Summer Olympics in Paris, which made him the first Olympic athlete from Iran, but the first time the nation sent a team to compete at the Olympics was at the 1948 Summer Olympics.

== Competitors ==
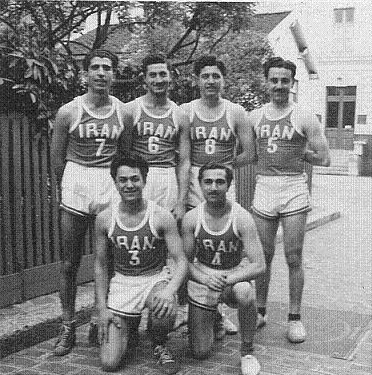
Iran National Basketball Team

Sport	Men	Women	Total
Basketball	13		13
Boxing	8		8
Shooting	3		3
Weightlifting	5		5
Wrestling	7		7
Total	36	0	36

== Medal summary ==
=== Medal table ===
Sport	Gold	Silver	Bronze	Total
Weightlifting			1	1
Total	0	0	1	1

=== Medalists ===
Medal	Name	Sport	Event
Bronze	Jafar Salmasi	Weightlifting	Men's 60 kg

== Results by event ==
=== Basketball ===
Men

Squad list	Preliminary group		Quarterfinal	Semifinal	Final	Rank
Squad list	Group D	Rank	Quarterfinal	Semifinal	Final	Rank
Kazem Ashtari; Hossein Jabbarzadegan; Houshang Rafatjah; Abolfazl Solbi; Asghar Ehsasi; Hossein Karandish; Fereydoun Sadeghi; Hossein Soroudi; Fereydoun Esfandiari; Farhang Mohtadi; Ziaeddin Shademan; Hossein Saoudipour; Hossein Hashemi; Coach: Kazem Rahbari	France; L 30–62	4	9th–16th places Canada; L 25–81	13th–16th places Hungary; W 2–0, WO	13th place match Cuba; L 36–70	14
Kazem Ashtari; Hossein Jabbarzadegan; Houshang Rafatjah; Abolfazl Solbi; Asghar Ehsasi; Hossein Karandish; Fereydoun Sadeghi; Hossein Soroudi; Fereydoun Esfandiari; Farhang Mohtadi; Ziaeddin Shademan; Hossein Saoudipour; Hossein Hashemi; Coach: Kazem Rahbari	Ireland; W 49–22	4	9th–16th places Canada; L 25–81	13th–16th places Hungary; W 2–0, WO	13th place match Cuba; L 36–70	14
Kazem Ashtari; Hossein Jabbarzadegan; Houshang Rafatjah; Abolfazl Solbi; Asghar Ehsasi; Hossein Karandish; Fereydoun Sadeghi; Hossein Soroudi; Fereydoun Esfandiari; Farhang Mohtadi; Ziaeddin Shademan; Hossein Saoudipour; Hossein Hashemi; Coach: Kazem Rahbari	Mexico; L 27–68	4	9th–16th places Canada; L 25–81	13th–16th places Hungary; W 2–0, WO	13th place match Cuba; L 36–70	14
Kazem Ashtari; Hossein Jabbarzadegan; Houshang Rafatjah; Abolfazl Solbi; Asghar Ehsasi; Hossein Karandish; Fereydoun Sadeghi; Hossein Soroudi; Fereydoun Esfandiari; Farhang Mohtadi; Ziaeddin Shademan; Hossein Saoudipour; Hossein Hashemi; Coach: Kazem Rahbari	Cuba; L 30–63	4	9th–16th places Canada; L 25–81	13th–16th places Hungary; W 2–0, WO	13th place match Cuba; L 36–70	14

=== Boxing ===
Men

Athlete	Event	1st round	2nd round	Quarterfinal	Semifinal	Final	Rank
Ghasem Rasaeli	51 kg	Corman (NED); L Points	Did not advance				17
Emmanuel Agassi	54 kg	Vicente (ESP); L Points	Did not advance				17
Jamshid Fani	58 kg	Savoie (CAN); L Disqualification	Did not advance				17
Masoud Rahimiha	62 kg	López (ARG); L Points	Did not advance				17
George Issabeg	67 kg	D'Ottavio (ITA); L Points	Did not advance				17
Hossein Tousi	73 kg	Karlsson (SWE); W Points	McKeon (IRL); L Points	Did not advance			9
Eskandar Shora	80 kg	Bye	Di Segni (ITA); L Points	Did not advance			9
Mohammad Jamshidabadi	+80 kg	Bye	Nilsson (SWE); L Disqualification	Did not advance			9

=== Shooting ===
Open

Athlete	Event	Score	Rank
Farhang Khosropanah	50 m rifle prone	545	69
Farhang Khosropanah	300 m rifle 3 positions	472	36
Samad Mollazal	50 m rifle prone	511	71
Samad Mollazal	300 m rifle 3 positions	660	34
Mahmoud Sakhaei	50 m rifle prone	552	67
Mahmoud Sakhaei	300 m rifle 3 positions	587	35

=== Weightlifting ===
Men

Athlete	Event	Press	Snatch	Clean & Jerk	Total	Rank
Mahmoud Namjoo	56 kg	82.5	82.5	122.5 OR	287.5	5
Jafar Salmasi	60 kg	100.0 OR	97.5	115.0	312.5	3rd place, bronze medalist(s)
Asadollah Mahini	67.5 kg	85.0	92.5	117.5	295.0	19
Nasser Mirghavami	75 kg	102.5	95.0	130.0	327.5	13
Rasoul Raeisi	82.5 kg	110.0	110.0	135.0	355.0	8

=== Wrestling ===
Men's freestyle

Athlete	Event	Round 1	Round 2	Round 3	Round 4	Round 5	Round 6	Round 7 / 8	Rank
Mansour Raeisi	52 kg	Jernigan (USA); L 0–3	Harris (AUS); W Fall	Jadhav (IND); W Fall	Balamir (TUR); L 0–3	Did not advance			4
Hassan Saadian	62 kg	Bilge (TUR); L Fall	Moore (USA); W 2–1	Tóth (HUN); L 0–3	Did not advance				11
Ali Ghaffari	67 kg	Ries (RSA); L 0–3	Kim (KOR); W Fall	Koll (USA); L Fall	Did not advance				11
Abbas Zandi	73 kg	Estrada (MEX); W Fall	Doğu (TUR); L Fall	Leclerc (FRA); L 0–3	Did not advance				7
Abbas Hariri	79 kg	Brand (USA); L 1–2	Did not appear	Did not advance					16
Mansour Mirghavami	87 kg	Morton (RSA); L 0–3	Tarányi (HUN); L 0–3	Did not advance					12
Abolghasem Sakhdari	+87 kg	Bye	Hutton (USA); L 1–2	Antonsson (SWE); L Fall	Did not advance				5
