= Wrestling at the 1948 Summer Olympics =

Coordinates: 51.5556°N 0.2797°W

Wrestling at the Games of the XIV Olympiad
- Venue: Empress Hall, Earls Court Exhibition Centre
- Dates: 29 July – 6 August
- Competitors: 219 from 29 nations

At the 1948 Summer Olympics, 16 wrestling events were contested, for all men. There were eight weight classes in Greco-Roman wrestling and eight classes in freestyle wrestling. The freestyle competitions were held from July 29 to July 31, 1948 and the Greco-Roman events were held from August 3 to August 6, 1948.

== Medal table ==
Rank	Nation	Gold	Silver	Bronze	Total
1	Turkey	6	4	1	11
2	Sweden	5	5	3	13
3	United States	2	1	1	4
4	Hungary	1	1	2	4
5	Finland	1	1	1	3
6	Italy	1	0	2	3
7	Switzerland	0	1	2	3
8	Australia	0	1	1	2
8	Egypt	0	1	1	2
10	Norway	0	1	0	1
11	Denmark	0	0	1	1
11	France	0	0	1	1
Totals (12 entries)		16	16	16	48

== Medal summary ==
=== Freestyle ===
Games	Gold	Silver	Bronze
Flyweight	Lenni Viitala; Finland	Halit Balamir; Turkey	Thure Johansson; Sweden
Bantamweight	Nasuh Akar; Turkey	Gerald Leeman; United States	Charles Kouyos; France
Featherweight	Gazanfer Bilge; Turkey	Ivar Sjölin; Sweden	Adolf Müller; Switzerland
Lightweight	Celal Atik; Turkey	Gösta Frändfors; Sweden	Hermann Baumann; Switzerland
Welterweight	Yaşar Doğu; Turkey	Dick Garrard; Australia	Leland Merrill; United States
Middleweight	Glen Brand; United States	Adil Candemir; Turkey	Erik Lindén; Sweden
Light Heavyweight	Henry Wittenberg; United States	Fritz Stöckli; Switzerland	Bengt Fahlqvist; Sweden
Heavyweight	Gyula Bóbis; Hungary	Bertil Antonsson; Sweden	Joseph Armstrong; Australia

=== Greco-Roman ===
Games	Gold	Silver	Bronze
Flyweight	Pietro Lombardi; Italy	Kenan Olcay; Turkey	Reino Kangasmäki; Finland
Bantamweight	Kurt Pettersén; Sweden	Mahmoud Hassan; Egypt	Halil Kaya; Turkey
Featherweight	Mehmet Oktav; Turkey	Olle Anderberg; Sweden	Ferenc Tóth; Hungary
Lightweight	Gustav Freij; Sweden	Aage Eriksen; Norway	Károly Ferencz; Hungary
Welterweight	Gösta Andersson; Sweden	Miklós Szilvási; Hungary	Henrik Hansen; Denmark
Middleweight	Axel Grönberg; Sweden	Muhlis Tayfur; Turkey	Ercole Gallegati; Italy
Light Heavyweight	Karl-Erik Nilsson; Sweden	Kelpo Gröndahl; Finland	Ibrahim Orabi; Egypt
Heavyweight	Ahmet Kireççi; Turkey	Tor Nilsson; Sweden	Guido Fantoni; Italy

== Participating nations ==
A total of 219 wrestlers from 29 nations competed at the London Games:

- Argentina (8)
- Australia (4)
- Austria (5)
- Belgium (9)
- Canada (6)
- Cuba (3)
- Czechoslovakia (3)
- Denmark (5)
- Egypt (13)
- Finland (15)
- France (11)
- Great Britain (16)
- Greece (5)
- Hungary (12)
- India (6)
- Italy (11)
- South Korea (4)
- Lebanon (5)
- Luxembourg (2)
- Mexico (4)
- Netherlands (4)
- Norway (6)
- Philippines (1)
- South Africa (3)
- Sweden (16)
- Switzerland (12)
- Turkey (16)
- United States (8)

N.B. - Pakistan sent four wrestlers, but they could not compete as they had been mistakenly entered for the Greco-Roman style and not freestyle.

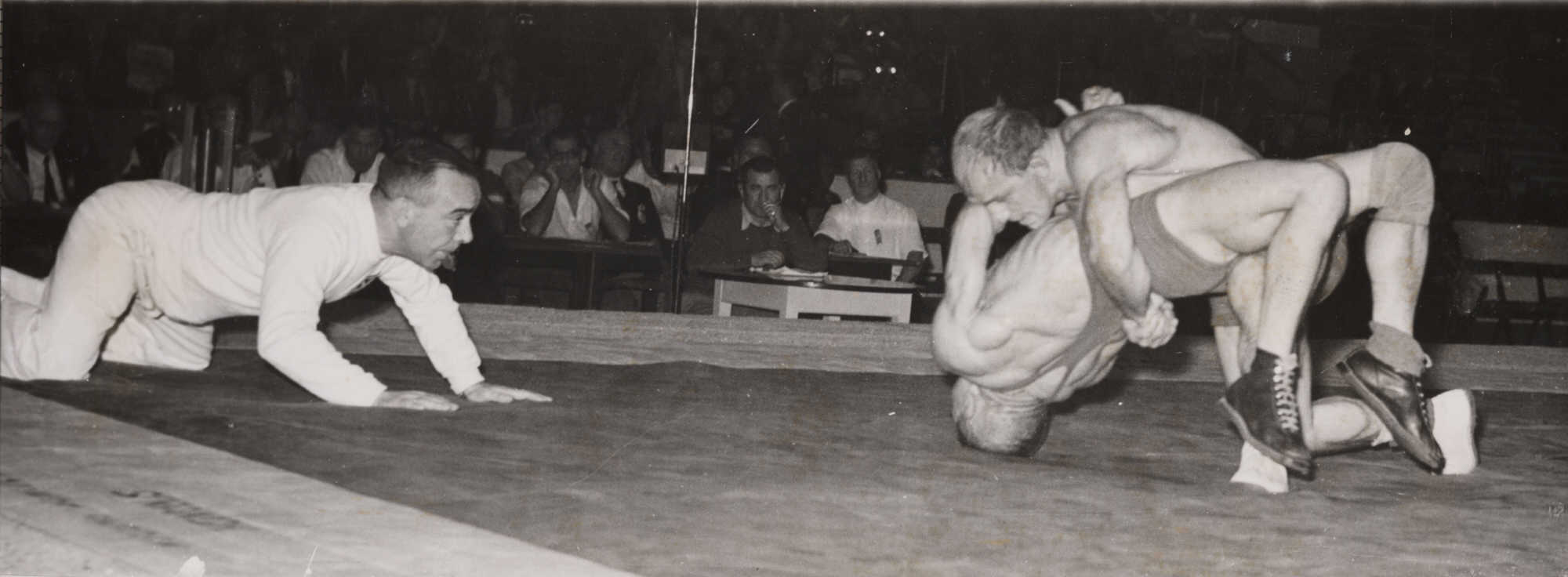
Olle Anderberg of Sweden wrestling Ferenc Tóth of Hungary in the Featherweight event

== See also ==
- List of World and Olympic Champions in men's freestyle wrestling
- List of World and Olympic Champions in Greco-Roman wrestling
