= Wrestling at the 1948 Summer Olympics – Men's freestyle flyweight =

Men's freestyle flyweight at the Games of the XIV Olympiad
- Venue: Empress Hall, Earls Court Exhibition Centre
- Dates: 29–31 July 1948
- Competitors: 11 from 11 nations

Medalists
1st place, gold medalist(s)		Lennart Viitala	Finland
2nd place, silver medalist(s)		Halit Balamir	Turkey
3rd place, bronze medalist(s)		Thure Johansson	Sweden

The men's freestyle flyweight competition at the 1948 Summer Olympics in London took place from 29 July to 31 July at the Empress Hall, Earls Court Exhibition Centre. Nations were limited to one competitor. Flyweight was the lightest category, including wrestlers weighing up to 52 kilograms (114.6 lb).

This freestyle wrestling competition continued to use the "bad points" elimination system introduced at the 1928 Summer Olympics for Greco-Roman and at the 1932 Summer Olympics for freestyle wrestling, with the slight modification introduced in 1936. Each round featured all wrestlers pairing off and wrestling one bout (with one wrestler having a bye if there were an odd number). The loser received 3 points if the loss was by fall or unanimous decision and 2 points if the decision was 2-1 (this was the modification from prior years, where all losses were 3 points). The winner received 1 point if the win was by decision and 0 points if the win was by fall. At the end of each round, any wrestler with at least 5 points was eliminated.

== Results ==
=== Round 1 ===
Bouts

Winner	Nation	Victory Type	Loser	Nation
Thure Johansson	Sweden	Decision, 3–0	Mohamed Abdel Hamid El-Ward	Egypt
Lennart Viitala	Finland	Decision, 2–1	Halit Balamir	Turkey
Billy Jernigan	United States	Decision, 3–0	Mansour Raisi	Iran
Roland Baudric	France	Decision, 2–1	Adolphe Lamot	Belgium
Khashaba Jadhav	India	Decision, 3–0	Bert Harris	Australia
Harry Parker	Great Britain	Bye	N/A	N/A

Points

Rank	Wrestler	Nation	Start	Earned	Total
1	Harry Parker	Great Britain	0	0	0
2	Roland Baudric	France	0	1	1
2	Khashaba Jadhav	India	0	1	1
2	Billy Jernigan	United States	0	1	1
2	Thure Johansson	Sweden	0	1	1
2	Lennart Viitala	Finland	0	1	1
7	Halit Balamir	Turkey	0	2	2
7	Adolphe Lamot	Belgium	0	2	2
9	Mohamed Abdel Hamid El-Ward	Egypt	0	3	3
9	Bert Harris	Australia	0	3	3
9	Mansour Raisi	Iran	0	3	3

=== Round 2 ===
Bouts

Winner	Nation	Victory Type	Loser	Nation
Thure Johansson	Sweden	Fall	Harry Parker	Great Britain
Halit Balamir	Turkey	Decision, 3–0	Roland Baudric	France
Lennart Viitala	Finland	Fall	Adolphe Lamot	Belgium
Mansour Raisi	Iran	Fall	Bert Harris	Australia
Khashaba Jadhav	India	Decision, 3–0	Billy Jernigan	United States
N/A	N/A	Over weight	Mohamed Abdel Hamid El-Ward	Egypt

Points

Rank	Wrestler	Nation	Start	Earned	Total
1	Thure Johansson	Sweden	1	0	1
1	Lennart Viitala	Finland	1	0	1
3	Khashaba Jadhav	India	1	1	2
4	Halit Balamir	Turkey	2	1	3
4	Harry Parker	Great Britain	0	3	3
4	Mansour Raisi	Iran	3	0	3
7	Roland Baudric	France	1	3	4
7	Billy Jernigan	United States	1	3	4
9	Adolphe Lamot	Belgium	2	3	5
10	Mohamed Abdel Hamid El-Ward	Egypt	3	3	6
10	Bert Harris	Australia	3	3	6

=== Round 3 ===
Bouts

Winner	Nation	Victory Type	Loser	Nation
Roland Baudric	France	Retired	Harry Parker	Great Britain
Halit Balamir	Turkey	Fall	Thure Johansson	Sweden
Lennart Viitala	Finland	Decision, 3–0	Billy Jernigan	United States
Mansour Raisi	Iran	Fall	Khashaba Jadhav	India

Points

Rank	Wrestler	Nation	Start	Earned	Total
1	Lennart Viitala	Finland	1	1	2
2	Halit Balamir	Turkey	3	0	3
2	Mansour Raisi	Iran	3	0	3
4	Roland Baudric	France	4	0	4
4	Thure Johansson	Sweden	1	3	4
6	Khashaba Jadhav	India	2	3	5
7	Harry Parker	Great Britain	3	3	6
8	Billy Jernigan	United States	4	3	7

=== Round 4 ===
Bouts

Winner	Nation	Victory Type	Loser	Nation
Thure Johansson	Sweden	Fall	Roland Baudric	France
Halit Balamir	Turkey	Decision, 3–0	Mansour Raisi	Iran
Lennart Viitala	Finland	Bye	N/A	N/A

Points

Rank	Wrestler	Nation	Start	Earned	Total
1	Lennart Viitala	Finland	2	0	2
2	Halit Balamir	Turkey	3	1	4
2	Thure Johansson	Sweden	4	0	4
4	Mansour Raisi	Iran	3	3	6
5	Roland Baudric	France	4	3	7

=== Round 5 ===
By the fifth round, three wrestlers were left. Viitala had already defeated Balamir, in round 1, and Balamir had previously defeated Johansson, in round 3. Thus, the only possible match left was Viitala against Johansson. Viitala won to secure the gold medal, with Balamir receiving silver (despite not reaching 5 points) due to the previous head-to-head result against Viitala.

Bouts

Winner	Nation	Victory Type	Loser	Nation
Lennart Viitala	Finland	Fall	Thure Johansson	Sweden
Halit Balamir	Turkey	Bye	N/A	N/A

Points

Rank	Wrestler	Nation	Start	Earned	Total
1st place, gold medalist(s)	Lennart Viitala	Finland	2	0	2
2nd place, silver medalist(s)	Halit Balamir	Turkey	4	0	4
3rd place, bronze medalist(s)	Thure Johansson	Sweden	4	3	7
