= Wrestling at the 1948 Summer Olympics – Men's Greco-Roman flyweight =

Men's Greco-Roman flyweight at the Games of the XIV Olympiad
- Venue: Empress Hall, Earls Court Exhibition Centre
- Dates: 3–6 August 1948
- Competitors: 13 from 13 nations

Medalists
1st place, gold medalist(s)		Pietro Lombardi	Italy
2nd place, silver medalist(s)		Kenan Olcay	Turkey
3rd place, bronze medalist(s)		Reino Kangasmäki	Finland

The men's Greco-Roman flyweight competition at the 1948 Summer Olympics in London took place from 3 August to 6 August at the Empress Hall, Earls Court Exhibition Centre. Nations were limited to one competitor. Flyweight was the lightest category, including wrestlers weighing up to 52 kilograms (114.6 lb).

This Greco-Roman wrestling competition continued to use the "bad points" elimination system introduced at the 1928 Summer Olympics for Greco-Roman and at the 1932 Summer Olympics for freestyle wrestling, with the slight modification introduced in 1936. Each round featured all wrestlers pairing off and wrestling one bout (with one wrestler having a bye if there were an odd number). The loser received 3 points if the loss was by fall or unanimous decision and 2 points if the decision was 2–1 (this was the modification from prior years, where all losses were 3 points). The winner received 1 point if the win was by decision and 0 points if the win was by fall. At the end of each round, any wrestler with at least 5 points was eliminated.

== Results ==
=== Round 1 ===
Bouts

Winner	Nation	Victory Type	Loser	Nation
Malte Möller	Sweden	Withdrew	Adolphe Lamot	Belgium
Edmond Faure	France	Decision, 2–1	Abdallah Sidani	Lebanon
Gyula Szilágyi	Hungary	Fall	Manuel Varela	Argentina
Mohamed Abdel-El	Egypt	Fall	Walter McGuffie	Great Britain
Kenan Olcay	Turkey	Decision, 3–0	Frithjof Clausen	Norway
Pietro Lombardi	Italy	Decision, 3–0	Svend Aage Thomsen	Denmark
Reino Kangasmäki	Finland	Bye	N/A	N/A

Points

Rank	Wrestler	Nation	Start	Earned	Total
1	Mohamed Abdel-El	Egypt	0	0	0
1	Reino Kangasmäki	Finland	0	0	0
1	Malte Möller	Sweden	0	0	0
1	Gyula Szilágyi	Hungary	0	0	0
5	Edmond Faure	France	0	1	1
5	Pietro Lombardi	Italy	0	1	1
5	Kenan Olcay	Turkey	0	1	1
8	Abdallah Sidani	Lebanon	0	2	2
9	Manuel Varela	Argentina	0	3	3
9	Walter McGuffie	Great Britain	0	3	3
9	Frithjof Clausen	Norway	0	3	3
9	Svend Aage Thomsen	Denmark	0	3	3
13	Adolphe Lamot	Belgium	0	3	3*

=== Round 2 ===
Bouts

Winner	Nation	Victory Type	Loser	Nation
Reino Kangasmäki	Finland	Decision, 2–1	Malte Möller	Sweden
Gyula Szilágyi	Hungary	Decision, 3–0	Edmond Faure	France
Manuel Varela	Argentina	Fall	Abdallah Sidani	Lebanon
Frithjof Clausen	Norway	Fall	Walter McGuffie	Great Britain
Pietro Lombardi	Italy	Fall	Mohamed Abdel-El	Egypt
Kenan Olcay	Turkey	Decision, 3–0	Svend Aage Thomsen	Denmark

Points

Rank	Wrestler	Nation	Start	Earned	Total
1	Reino Kangasmäki	Finland	0	1	1
1	Pietro Lombardi	Italy	1	0	1
1	Gyula Szilágyi	Hungary	0	1	1
4	Malte Möller	Sweden	0	2	2
4	Kenan Olcay	Turkey	1	1	2
6	Mohamed Abdel-El	Egypt	0	3	3
6	Frithjof Clausen	Norway	3	0	3
6	Manuel Varela	Argentina	3	0	3
9	Edmond Faure	France	1	3	4
10	Abdallah Sidani	Lebanon	2	3	5
11	Walter McGuffie	Great Britain	3	3	6
11	Svend Aage Thomsen	Denmark	3	3	6

=== Round 3 ===
Bouts

Winner	Nation	Victory Type	Loser	Nation
Reino Kangasmäki	Finland	Fall	Edmond Faure	France
Malte Möller	Sweden	Decision, 2–1	Gyula Szilágyi	Hungary
Frithjof Clausen	Norway	Decision, 3–0	Manuel Varela	Argentina
Kenan Olcay	Turkey	Fall	Mohamed Abdel-El	Egypt
Pietro Lombardi	Italy	Bye	N/A	N/A

Points

Rank	Wrestler	Nation	Start	Earned	Total
1	Reino Kangasmäki	Finland	1	0	1
1	Pietro Lombardi	Italy	1	0	1
3	Kenan Olcay	Turkey	2	0	2
4	Malte Möller	Sweden	2	1	3
4	Gyula Szilágyi	Hungary	1	2	3
6	Frithjof Clausen	Norway	3	1	4
7	Mohamed Abdel-El	Egypt	3	3	6
7	Manuel Varela	Argentina	3	3	6
9	Edmond Faure	France	4	3	7

=== Round 4 ===
Bouts

Winner	Nation	Victory Type	Loser	Nation
Pietro Lombardi	Italy	Decision, 3–0	Reino Kangasmäki	Finland
Malte Möller	Sweden	Fall	Frithjof Clausen	Norway
Gyula Szilágyi	Hungary	Decision, 2–1	Kenan Olcay	Turkey

Points

Rank	Wrestler	Nation	Start	Earned	Total
1	Pietro Lombardi	Italy	1	1	2
2	Malte Möller	Sweden	3	0	3
3	Reino Kangasmäki	Finland	1	3	4
3	Kenan Olcay	Turkey	2	2	4
3	Gyula Szilágyi	Hungary	3	1	4
6	Frithjof Clausen	Norway	4	3	7

=== Round 5 ===
The Official Report gives final rankings for the top 6 wrestlers. It is not clear why Kangasmäki received the bronze. Of the three men eliminated in this round, each was 1–1 against the others (Szilágyi defeated Kangasmäki, who defeated Möller, who defeated Szilágyi). Szilágyi had the fewest bad points, at 5 to the other two wrestlers' 6. Szilágyi was also 4–1 overall, compared to Kangasmäki's 2–2 and Möller's 3–2. Sports-Reference says that Kangasmäki took bronze based on the victory over Möller, but does not explain Szilágyi finishing 5th.

Bouts

Winner	Nation	Victory Type	Loser	Nation
Pietro Lombardi	Italy	Decision, 3–0	Malte Möller	Sweden
Gyula Szilágyi	Hungary	Decision, 2–1	Reino Kangasmäki	Finland
Kenan Olcay	Turkey	Bye	N/A	N/A

Points

Rank	Wrestler	Nation	Start	Earned	Total
1	Pietro Lombardi	Italy	2	1	3
2	Kenan Olcay	Turkey	4	0	4
3rd place, bronze medalist(s)	Reino Kangasmäki	Finland	4	2	6
4	Malte Möller	Sweden	3	3	6
5	Gyula Szilágyi	Hungary	4	1	5

=== Round 6 ===
Bouts

Winner	Nation	Victory Type	Loser	Nation
Pietro Lombardi	Italy	Decision, 2–1	Kenan Olcay	Turkey

Points

Rank	Wrestler	Nation	Start	Earned	Total
1st place, gold medalist(s)	Pietro Lombardi	Italy	3	1	4
2nd place, silver medalist(s)	Kenan Olcay	Turkey	4	2	6
