= Wrestling at the 1948 Summer Olympics – Men's freestyle heavyweight =

Olympic wrestling tournament

Men's freestyle heavyweight at the Games of the XIV Olympiad
- Venue: Empress Hall, Earls Court Exhibition Centre
- Dates: 29–31 July 1948
- Competitors: 9 from 9 nations

Medalists
1st place, gold medalist(s)		Gyula Bóbis	Hungary
2nd place, silver medalist(s)		Bertil Antonsson	Sweden
3rd place, bronze medalist(s)		Jim Armstrong	Australia

The men's freestyle heavyweight competition at the 1948 Summer Olympics in London took place from 29 July to 31 July at the Empress Hall, Earls Court Exhibition Centre. Nations were limited to one competitor. Heavyweight was the heaviest category, including wrestlers weighing over 87 kilograms (191.8 lb).

This freestyle wrestling competition continued to use the "bad points" elimination system introduced at the 1928 Summer Olympics for Greco-Roman and at the 1932 Summer Olympics for freestyle wrestling, with the slight modification introduced in 1936. Each round featured all wrestlers pairing off and wrestling one bout (with one wrestler having a bye if there were an odd number). The loser received 3 points if the loss was by fall or unanimous decision and 2 points if the decision was 2-1 (this was the modification from prior years, where all losses were 3 points). The winner received 1 point if the win was by decision and 0 points if the win was by fall. At the end of each round, any wrestler with at least 5 points was eliminated.

== Results ==
=== Round 1 ===
Bouts

Winner	Nation	Victory Type	Loser	Nation
Josef Růžička	Czechoslovakia	Decision, 2–1	Dick Hutton	United States
Jim Armstrong	Australia	Decision, 3–0	Fred Oberlander	Great Britain
Gyula Bóbis	Hungary	Decision, 3–0	Willy Lardon	Switzerland
Bertil Antonsson	Sweden	Decision, 3–0	Sadik Esen	Turkey
Abolghasem Sakhdari	Iran	Bye	N/A	N/A

Points

Rank	Wrestler	Nation	Start	Earned	Total
1	Abolghasem Sakhdari	Iran	0	0	0
2	Bertil Antonsson	Sweden	0	1	1
2	Jim Armstrong	Australia	0	1	1
2	Gyula Bóbis	Hungary	0	1	1
2	Josef Růžička	Czechoslovakia	0	1	1
6	Dick Hutton	United States	0	2	2
7	Fred Oberlander	Great Britain	0	3	3
7	Willy Lardon	Switzerland	0	3	3
7	Sadik Esen	Turkey	0	3	3

=== Round 2 ===
Bouts

Winner	Nation	Victory Type	Loser	Nation
Josef Růžička	Czechoslovakia	Decision, 2–1	Fred Oberlander	Great Britain
Dick Hutton	United States	Decision, 2–1	Abolghasem Sakhdari	Iran
Gyula Bóbis	Hungary	Fall	Jim Armstrong	Australia
Sadik Esen	Turkey	Decision, 3–0	Willy Lardon	Switzerland
Bertil Antonsson	Sweden	Bye	N/A	N/A

Points

Rank	Wrestler	Nation	Start	Earned	Total
1	Bertil Antonsson	Sweden	1	0	1
1	Gyula Bóbis	Hungary	1	0	1
3	Josef Růžička	Czechoslovakia	1	1	2
3	Abolghasem Sakhdari	Iran	0	2	2
5	Dick Hutton	United States	2	1	3
6	Jim Armstrong	Australia	1	3	4
6	Sadik Esen	Turkey	3	1	4
8	Fred Oberlander	Great Britain	3	2	5
9	Willy Lardon	Switzerland	3	3	6

=== Round 3 ===
Bouts

Winner	Nation	Victory Type	Loser	Nation
Bertil Antonsson	Sweden	Fall	Abolghasem Sakhdari	Iran
Jim Armstrong	Australia	Retired	Dick Hutton	United States
Gyula Bóbis	Hungary	Fall	Josef Růžička	Czechoslovakia
Sadik Esen	Turkey	Bye	N/A	N/A

Points

Rank	Wrestler	Nation	Start	Earned	Total
1	Bertil Antonsson	Sweden	1	0	1
1	Gyula Bóbis	Hungary	1	0	1
3	Jim Armstrong	Australia	4	0	4
3	Sadik Esen	Turkey	4	0	4
5	Josef Růžička	Czechoslovakia	2	3	5
5	Abolghasem Sakhdari	Iran	2	3	5
7	Dick Hutton	United States	3	3	6

=== Round 4 ===
Bouts

Winner	Nation	Victory Type	Loser	Nation
Jim Armstrong	Australia	Fall	Sadik Esen	Turkey
Gyula Bóbis	Hungary	Decision, 2–1	Bertil Antonsson	Sweden

Points

Rank	Wrestler	Nation	Start	Earned	Total
1	Gyula Bóbis	Hungary	1	1	2
2	Bertil Antonsson	Sweden	1	2	3
3	Jim Armstrong	Australia	4	0	4
4	Sadik Esen	Turkey	4	3	7

=== Round 5 ===
Bóbis had already defeated both Armstrong and Antonsson, so the only possible match remaining was between the two of them (guaranteeing Bóbis the gold medal and making round 5 in effect a silver/bronze bout). Antonsson won by fall, taking the silver.

Bouts

Winner	Nation	Victory Type	Loser	Nation
Bertil Antonsson	Sweden	Fall	Jim Armstrong	Australia
Gyula Bóbis	Hungary	Bye	N/A	N/A

Points

Rank	Wrestler	Nation	Start	Earned	Total
1st place, gold medalist(s)	Gyula Bóbis	Hungary	1	0	2
2nd place, silver medalist(s)	Bertil Antonsson	Sweden	3	0	3
3rd place, bronze medalist(s)	Jim Armstrong	Australia	4	3	7
