= Wrestling at the 1948 Summer Olympics – Men's freestyle welterweight =

Men's freestyle welterweight at the Games of the XIV Olympiad
- Venue: Empress Hall, Earls Court Exhibition Centre
- Dates: 29–31 July 1948
- Competitors: 16 from 16 nations

Medalists
1st place, gold medalist(s)		Yaşar Doğu	Turkey
2nd place, silver medalist(s)		Dick Garrard	Australia
3rd place, bronze medalist(s)		Leland Merrill	United States

The men's freestyle welterweight competition at the 1948 Summer Olympics in London took place from 29 July to 31 July at the Empress Hall, Earls Court Exhibition Centre. Nations were limited to one competitor. Welterweight was the fourth-heaviest category, including wrestlers weighing 67 to 73 kilograms (147.7 to 160.9 lb).

This freestyle wrestling competition continued to use the "bad points" elimination system introduced at the 1928 Summer Olympics for Greco-Roman and at the 1932 Summer Olympics for freestyle wrestling, with the slight modification introduced in 1936. Each round featured all wrestlers pairing off and wrestling one bout (with one wrestler having a buy, if there were an odd number). The loser received 3 points if the loss was by fall or unanimous decision and 2 points if the decision was 2-1 (this was the modification from prior years, where all losses were 3 points). The winner received 1 point if the win was by decision and 0 points if the win was by fall. At the end of each round, any wrestler with at least 5 points was eliminated.

== Results ==
=== Round 1 ===
Bouts

Winner	Nation	Victory Type	Loser	Nation
Kálmán Sóvári	Hungary	Decision, 3–0	Aleksanteri Keisala	Finland
Dick Garrard	Australia	Decision, 3–0	Willy Angst	Switzerland
Yaşar Doğu	Turkey	Fall	Anant Bhargava	India
Abbas Zandi	Iran	Fall	Eduardo Estrada	Mexico
Jean-Baptiste Leclerc	France	Decision, 3–0	Adel Ibrahim Moustafa	Egypt
Hwang Byeong-gwan	South Korea	Decision, 3–0	Louis Culot	Belgium
Leland Merrill	United States	Decision, 3–0	Harry Peace	Canada
Frans Westergren	Sweden	Decision, 2–1	Don Irvine	Great Britain

Points

Rank	Wrestler	Nation	Start	Earned	Total
1	Yaşar Doğu	Turkey	0	0	0
1	Abbas Zandi	Iran	0	0	0
3	Dick Garrard	Australia	0	1	1
3	Hwang Byeong-gwan	South Korea	0	1	1
3	Jean-Baptiste Leclerc	France	0	1	1
3	Leland Merrill	United States	0	1	1
3	Kálmán Sóvári	Hungary	0	1	1
3	Frans Westergren	Sweden	0	1	1
9	Don Irvine	Great Britain	0	2	2
10	Willy Angst	Switzerland	0	3	3
10	Anant Bhargava	India	0	3	3
10	Louis Culot	Belgium	0	3	3
10	Eduardo Estrada	Mexico	0	3	3
10	Aleksanteri Keisala	Finland	0	3	3
10	Adel Ibrahim Moustafa	Egypt	0	3	3
10	Harry Peace	Canada	0	3	3

=== Round 2 ===
Bouts

Winner	Nation	Victory Type	Loser	Nation
Dick Garrard	Australia	Decision, 2–1	Kálmán Sóvári	Hungary
Willy Angst	Switzerland	Decision, 3–0	Aleksanteri Keisala	Finland
Anant Bhargava	India	Decision, 2–1	Eduardo Estrada	Mexico
Yaşar Doğu	Turkey	Fall	Abbas Zandi	Iran
Adel Ibrahim Moustafa	Egypt	Decision, 2–1	Hwang Byeong-gwan	South Korea
Jean-Baptiste Leclerc	France	Decision, 3–0	Louis Culot	Belgium
Leland Merrill	United States	Decision, 3–0	Frans Westergren	Sweden
Harry Peace	Canada	Fall	Don Irvine	Great Britain

Points

Rank	Wrestler	Nation	Start	Earned	Total
1	Yaşar Doğu	Turkey	0	0	0
2	Dick Garrard	Australia	1	1	2
2	Jean-Baptiste Leclerc	France	1	1	2
2	Leland Merrill	United States	1	1	2
5	Hwang Byeong-gwan	South Korea	1	2	3
5	Harry Peace	Canada	3	0	3
5	Kálmán Sóvári	Hungary	1	2	3
5	Abbas Zandi	Iran	0	3	3
9	Willy Angst	Switzerland	3	1	4
9	Anant Bhargava	India	3	1	4
9	Adel Ibrahim Moustafa	Egypt	3	1	4
9	Frans Westergren	Sweden	1	3	4
13	Eduardo Estrada	Mexico	3	2	5
13	Don Irvine	Great Britain	2	3	5
15	Louis Culot	Belgium	3	3	6
15	Aleksanteri Keisala	Finland	3	3	6

=== Round 3 ===
Bouts

Winner	Nation	Victory Type	Loser	Nation
Kálmán Sóvári	Hungary	Decision, 2–1	Willy Angst	Switzerland
Dick Garrard	Australia	Fall	Anant Bhargava	India
Yaşar Doğu	Turkey	Fall	Adel Ibrahim Moustafa	Egypt
Frans Westergren	Sweden	Decision, 3–0	Harry Peace	Canada
Jean-Baptiste Leclerc	France	Decision, 3–0	Abbas Zandi	Iran
Leland Merrill	United States	Decision, 3–0	Hwang Byeong-gwan	South Korea

Points

Rank	Wrestler	Nation	Start	Earned	Total
1	Yaşar Doğu	Turkey	0	0	0
2	Dick Garrard	Australia	2	0	2
3	Jean-Baptiste Leclerc	France	2	1	3
3	Leland Merrill	United States	2	1	3
5	Kálmán Sóvári	Hungary	3	1	4
6	Frans Westergren	Sweden	4	1	5
7	Willy Angst	Switzerland	4	2	6
7	Hwang Byeong-gwan	South Korea	3	3	6
7	Harry Peace	Canada	3	3	6
7	Abbas Zandi	Iran	3	3	6
11	Anant Bhargava	India	4	3	7
11	Adel Ibrahim Moustafa	Egypt	4	3	7

=== Round 4 ===
Bouts

Winner	Nation	Victory Type	Loser	Nation
Dick Garrard	Australia	Fall	Jean-Baptiste Leclerc	France
Yaşar Doğu	Turkey	Fall	Kálmán Sóvári	Hungary
Leland Merrill	United States	Bye	N/A	N/A

Points

Rank	Wrestler	Nation	Start	Earned	Total
1	Yaşar Doğu	Turkey	0	0	0
2	Dick Garrard	Australia	2	0	2
3	Leland Merrill	United States	3	0	3
4	Jean-Baptiste Leclerc	France	3	3	6
5	Kálmán Sóvári	Hungary	4	3	7

=== Round 5 ===
Bouts

Winner	Nation	Victory Type	Loser	Nation
Leland Merrill	United States	Decision, 2–1	Dick Garrard	Australia
Yaşar Doğu	Turkey	Bye	N/A	N/A

Points

Rank	Wrestler	Nation	Start	Earned	Total
1	Yaşar Doğu	Turkey	0	0	0
2	Dick Garrard	Australia	2	2	4
2	Leland Merrill	United States	3	1	4

=== Round 6 ===
Bouts

Winner	Nation	Victory Type	Loser	Nation
Yaşar Doğu	Turkey	Decision, 3–0	Leland Merrill	United States
Dick Garrard	Australia	Bye	N/A	N/A

Points

Rank	Wrestler	Nation	Start	Earned	Total
1	Yaşar Doğu	Turkey	0	1	1
2	Dick Garrard	Australia	4	0	4
3rd place, bronze medalist(s)	Leland Merrill	United States	4	3	7

=== Round 7 ===
Bouts

Winner	Nation	Victory Type	Loser	Nation
Yaşar Doğu	Turkey	Fall	Dick Garrard	Australia

Points

Rank	Wrestler	Nation	Start	Earned	Total
1st place, gold medalist(s)	Yaşar Doğu	Turkey	1	0	1
2nd place, silver medalist(s)	Dick Garrard	Australia	4	3	7
