= K. D. Jadhav =

Indian wrestler (1925–1984)

Khashaba Jadhav

Personal information
- Full name: Khashaba Dadasaheb Jadhav
- Nicknames: Pocket Dynamo; KD
- Citizenship: British Indian (1925–1947); Indian (1947–1984)
- Born: 15 January 1925 Satara, Satara district, Bombay Presidency, British India
- Died: 14 August 1984 (aged 59) Karad, Maharashtra, India
- Height: 1.67 m (5 ft 6 in)
- Weight: 54 kg (119 lb)

Sport
- Country: India
- Sport: Wrestling
- Event: Freestyle
- Coached by: Rees Gardner
Medal record
Men's freestyle wrestling
Representing India
Olympic Games
Bronze medal – third place	1952 Helsinki	Bantamweight

Khashaba Dadasaheb Jadhav (15 January 1925 – 14 August 1984) was an Indian freestyle wrestler. He is best known for winning a bronze medal at the 1952 Summer Olympics in Helsinki. He was the first athlete from independent India to win an individual medal in the Olympics.

After Norman Pritchard who won two silver medals in athletics in 1900 under colonial India, Khashaba was the first individual athlete from independent India to win a medal at the Olympics. In the years before Khashaba, India would only win gold medals in field hockey, a team sport. He is the only Indian Olympic medalist who never received a Padma Award. Khashaba was extremely nimble on his feet, which made him different from other wrestlers of his time. He belonged to Goleshwar village near Karad. He was posthumously awarded Arjuna Award in 2000 for his contribution to wrestling.

== Childhood ==
Born in a village called Goleshwar in Karad taluka of District Satara in Maharashtra State, KD Jadhav was the youngest of five sons of a renowned wrestler Dadasaheb Jadhav. He did his schooling in Tilak High School in Karad taluka of Satara district between 1940 and 1947. He grew up in a household that lived and breathed wrestling.

== Wrestling career ==
Starting his wrestling career in 1948, he first came into the limelight at the 1948 London Olympics when he finished 6th in the flyweight category. He was the first Indian to achieve such a high position in the individual category. Despite being new to wrestling on a mat as well as the international rules of wrestling, Jadhav finished the competition at 6th place.

For the next four years, Jadhav trained even harder for the Helsinki Olympics where he moved up one weight category and participated in the bantamweight category (57 kg), which saw wrestlers from twenty-four countries. He went on to defeat wrestlers from countries like Mexico, Germany and Canada, before losing his semi-final bout, but he came back stronger to win the bronze medal which made him the first ever individual Olympic medallist of independent India.

== 1948 Summer Olympics ==
Jadhav's first feel of the big stage was at the 1948 London Olympics; his journey was funded by the Maharaja of Kolhapur. The Story Of KD Jadhav A.K.A 'Pocket Dynamo' Who Won India's First Individual Olympic Medal|website=www.mensxp.com|date=7 June 2016|access-date=3 March 2019|archive-date=6 March 2019| He stunned the audience by defeating the Australian wrestler Bert Harris in the first few minutes of the bout. He went on to defeat Billy Jernigan of the US, but lost to Mansour Raeisi of Iran, to be eliminated from the Games.

Res.	Opponent	Score	Date	Event	Location	Notes
Win	(Australia) Bert Harris	3–0	29 July	1948 Summer Olympics Men's Flyweight, Freestyle	(United Kingdom) London	Rank 2T
Win	(United States) Billy Jernigan	3–0	30 July	1948 Summer Olympics Men's Flyweight, Freestyle	(United Kingdom) London	Rank 3
Loss	(Iran) Mansour Raeisi	Tech. Fall; 5:31	30 July	1948 Summer Olympics Men's Flyweight, Freestyle	(United Kingdom) London	Rank 6 (Eliminated)

=== Aftermath ===
For the next four years, Jadhav trained even harder for the Helsinki Olympics where he moved up in weight and participated in the 125 lb bantamweight category which saw wrestlers from twenty-four countries, he increased the tempo of his preparation for the next Olympics in Helsinki.

== 1952 Summer Olympics ==
After the marathon bout, he was asked to fight Soviet Union's Rashid Mammadbeyov. As per the rules a rest of at least 30 minutes were required between bouts, but no Indian official was available to press his case, a tired Jadhav, failed to inspire and Mammadbeyov cashed in on the chance to reach the final. Defeating the wrestlers from Canada, Mexico and Germany, he won bronze medal on 23 July 1952 thereby creating history by becoming Independent India's first individual medal winner. Khashaba's colleague, Krishnarao Mangave a wrestler, also participated in the same Olympics in another category but missed the bronze medal by just one point.

Res.	Opponent	Score	Date	Event	Location	Notes
Win	(Canada) Adrien Poliquin	Tech. Fall; 14:25	1952-07-20	1952 Summer Olympics Men's Bantamweight, Freestyle	(Finland) Helsinki	Rank 1T
Win	(Mexico) Leonardo Basurto	Tech. Fall; 5:20	1952-07-20	1952 Summer Olympics Men's Bantamweight, Freestyle	(Finland) Helsinki	Rank 1T
Win	(Germany) Ferdinand Schmitz	2-1	1952-07-20	1952 Summer Olympics Men's Bantamweight, Freestyle	(Finland) Helsinki	Rank 2T
Loss	(Soviet Union) Rashid Mammadbeyov	3-0	1952-07-20	1952 Summer Olympics Men's Bantamweight, Freestyle	(Finland) Helsinki	Rank 1T
Loss	(Japan) Shohachi Ishii	3-0	1952-07-20	1952 Summer Olympics Men's Bantamweight, Freestyle	(Finland) Helsinki	Rank 3 Bronze Medal

=== Return from the 1952 Summer Olympics ===
Although India's hockey team bagged a gold at the Helsinki games, Jadhav was the primary attraction of India's contingent that returned home after the Olympics. Crowd gathered at the Karad Railway Station to welcome their hero, a cavalcade of 151 bullock carts and dhols, carried their hero for about 10 km and passed through the village of Goleshwar.

== Later life and death ==
In 1955, he joined the police force as a sub-inspector where he won several competitions held within the Police department and also performed National duties as a sports instructor. Despite serving the police department for twenty-seven years and retiring as an Asst. Police Commissioner, Jadhav had to fight for pension later on in his life. For years, he was neglected by the sports federation and had to live the final stages of his life in poverty. He died in a road accident in 1984, his wife struggled to get any assistance from any quarter.

== Literature ==
Pune-based writer Sanjay Dudhane's book on Khashaba Jadhav's life, Olympicveer Khashaba Jadhav (2001). This is Registered Copyright literature on K.D.Jadhav. Registration Number: L-150961/2024,

== Awards and honours ==
- He was honoured by making him a part of the torch run at the 1982 Asian Games in Delhi
- The Maharashtra Government awarded the Chhatrapati Puraskar posthumously in 1992–1993.
- He was posthumously honoured with the Arjuna Award in 2000.
- The newly built wrestling venue for the 2010 Delhi Commonwealth Games was named after him to honour his achievement.
- Pune-based writer Sanjay Dudhane's book on Jadhav's life, Olympicveer Khashaba Jadhav (2001). This is only one literature on K.D.Jdhav.
- On 15 January 2023, Google honoured Jadhav with a Google Doodle on his 97th birth anniversary.

== Related pages ==
- Sports in India
- India at the Olympics
