= Wrestling at the 1948 Summer Olympics – Men's freestyle lightweight =

Olympic wrestling tournament

Men's freestyle lightweight at the Games of the XIV Olympiad
- Venue: Empress Hall, Earls Court Exhibition Centre
- Dates: 29–31 July 1948
- Competitors: 18 from 18 nations

Medalists
1st place, gold medalist(s)		Celal Atik	Turkey
2nd place, silver medalist(s)		Gösta Frändfors	Sweden
3rd place, bronze medalist(s)		Hermann Baumann	Switzerland

The men's freestyle lightweight competition at the 1948 Summer Olympics in London took place from 29 July to 31 July at the Empress Hall, Earls Court Exhibition Centre. Nations were limited to one competitor. Lightweight was the fourth-lightest category, including wrestlers weighing 62 to 67 kilograms (136.7 to 147.7 lb).

This freestyle wrestling competition continued to use the "bad points" elimination system introduced at the 1928 Summer Olympics for Greco-Roman and at the 1932 Summer Olympics for freestyle wrestling, with the slight modification introduced in 1936. Each round featured all wrestlers pairing off and wrestling one bout (with one wrestler having a bye if there were an odd number). The loser received 3 points if the loss was by fall or unanimous decision and 2 points if the decision was 2-1 (this was the modification from prior years, where all losses were 3 points). The winner received 1 point if the win was by decision and 0 points if the win was by fall. At the end of each round, any wrestler with at least 5 points was eliminated.

== Results ==
=== Round 1 ===
Bechara withdrew during his bout. Pérez withdrew after his loss.

Bouts

Winner	Nation	Victory Type	Loser	Nation
Celal Atik	Turkey	Fall	Bill Koll	United States
Mohamed Hassan Moussa	Egypt	Decision, 3–0	Banta Singh	India
Tony Ries Sr.	South Africa	Decision, 3–0	Ali Ghaffari	Iran
Kim Seog-yeong	South Korea	Retired	Abou Rejaile Bechara	Lebanon
Jan Cools	Belgium	Decision, 3–0	Israel Sánchez	Cuba
Garibaldo Nizzola	Italy	Decision, 2–1	Sulo Leppänen	Finland
Morgan Plumb	Canada	Decision, 3–0	Peter Luck	Great Britain
Hermann Baumann	Switzerland	Fall	José Luis Pérez	Mexico
Gösta Frändfors	Sweden	Decision, 3–0	László Bakos	Hungary

Points

Rank	Wrestler	Nation	Start	Earned	Total
1	Celal Atik	Turkey	0	0	0
1	Hermann Baumann	Switzerland	0	0	0
1	Kim Seog-yeong	South Korea	0	0	0
4	Jan Cools	Belgium	0	1	1
4	Gösta Frändfors	Sweden	0	1	1
4	Mohamed Hassan Moussa	Egypt	0	1	1
4	Garibaldo Nizzola	Italy	0	1	1
4	Morgan Plumb	Canada	0	1	1
4	Tony Ries Sr.	South Africa	0	1	1
10	Sulo Leppänen	Finland	0	2	2
11	László Bakos	Hungary	0	3	3
11	Ali Ghaffari	Iran	0	3	3
11	Bill Koll	United States	0	3	3
11	Peter Luck	Great Britain	0	3	3
11	Israel Sánchez	Cuba	0	3	3
11	Banta Singh	India	0	3	3
17	Abou Rejaile Bechara	Lebanon	0	3	3*
17	José Luis Pérez	Mexico	0	3	3*

=== Round 2 ===
Bouts

Winner	Nation	Victory Type	Loser	Nation
Bill Koll	United States	Decision, 3–0	Mohamed Hassan Moussa	Egypt
Celal Atik	Turkey	Fall	Banta Singh	India
Ali Ghaffari	Iran	Fall	Kim Seog-yeong	South Korea
Sulo Leppänen	Finland	Decision, 3–0	Jan Cools	Belgium
Garibaldo Nizzola	Italy	Decision, 3–0	Israel Sánchez	Cuba
Hermann Baumann	Switzerland	Decision, 3–0	Morgan Plumb	Canada
László Bakos	Hungary	Decision, 3–0	Peter Luck	Great Britain
Gösta Frändfors	Sweden	Fall	Tony Ries Sr.	South Africa

Points

Rank	Wrestler	Nation	Start	Earned	Total
1	Celal Atik	Turkey	0	0	0
2	Hermann Baumann	Switzerland	0	1	1
2	Gösta Frändfors	Sweden	1	0	1
4	Garibaldo Nizzola	Italy	1	1	2
5	Ali Ghaffari	Iran	3	0	3
5	Kim Seog-yeong	South Korea	0	3	3
5	Sulo Leppänen	Finland	2	1	3
8	László Bakos	Hungary	3	1	4
8	Jan Cools	Belgium	1	3	4
8	Mohamed Hassan Moussa	Egypt	1	3	4
8	Bill Koll	United States	3	1	4
8	Morgan Plumb	Canada	1	3	4
8	Tony Ries Sr.	South Africa	1	3	4
14	Peter Luck	Great Britain	3	3	6
14	Israel Sánchez	Cuba	3	3	6
14	Banta Singh	India	3	3	6

=== Round 3 ===
Bouts

Winner	Nation	Victory Type	Loser	Nation
Garibaldo Nizzola	Italy	Decision, 3–0	Jan Cools	Belgium
Sulo Leppänen	Finland	Decision, 3–0	Morgan Plumb	Canada
László Bakos	Hungary	Decision, 3–0	Hermann Baumann	Switzerland
Bill Koll	United States	Fall	Ali Ghaffari	Iran
Celal Atik	Turkey	Fall	Tony Ries Sr.	South Africa
Kim Seog-yeong	South Korea	Decision, 3–0	Mohamed Hassan Moussa	Egypt
Gösta Frändfors	Sweden	Bye	N/A	N/A

Points

Rank	Wrestler	Nation	Start	Earned	Total
1	Celal Atik	Turkey	0	0	0
2	Gösta Frändfors	Sweden	1	0	1
3	Garibaldo Nizzola	Italy	2	1	3
4	Hermann Baumann	Switzerland	1	3	4
4	Kim Seog-yeong	South Korea	3	1	4
4	Bill Koll	United States	4	0	4
4	Sulo Leppänen	Finland	3	1	4
8	László Bakos	Hungary	4	1	5
9	Ali Ghaffari	Iran	3	3	6
10	Jan Cools	Belgium	4	3	7
10	Mohamed Hassan Moussa	Egypt	4	3	7
10	Morgan Plumb	Canada	4	3	7
10	Tony Ries Sr.	South Africa	4	3	7

=== Round 4 ===
Bouts

Winner	Nation	Victory Type	Loser	Nation
Gösta Frändfors	Sweden	Decision, 2–1	Bill Koll	United States
Celal Atik	Turkey	Decision, 3–0	Sulo Leppänen	Finland
Garibaldo Nizzola	Italy	Decision, 3–0	Kim Seog-yeong	South Korea
Hermann Baumann	Switzerland	Bye	N/A	N/A

Points

Rank	Wrestler	Nation	Start	Earned	Total
1	Celal Atik	Turkey	0	1	1
2	Gösta Frändfors	Sweden	1	1	2
3	Hermann Baumann	Switzerland	4	0	4
3	Garibaldo Nizzola	Italy	3	1	4
5	Bill Koll	United States	4	2	6
6	Kim Seog-yeong	South Korea	4	3	7
6	Sulo Leppänen	Finland	4	3	7

=== Round 5 ===
Bouts

Winner	Nation	Victory Type	Loser	Nation
Gösta Frändfors	Sweden	Decision, 3–0	Hermann Baumann	Switzerland
Celal Atik	Turkey	Fall	Garibaldo Nizzola	Italy

Points

Rank	Wrestler	Nation	Start	Earned	Total
1	Celal Atik	Turkey	1	0	1
2	Gösta Frändfors	Sweden	2	1	3
3	Hermann Baumann	Switzerland	4	3	7
3	Garibaldo Nizzola	Italy	4	3	7

=== Round 6 ===
Baumann and Nizzola had each finished round 5 with 7 points and were eliminated, but faced off in a bronze medal bout won by Baumann. Atik defeated Frändfors to take the gold medal.

Bouts

Winner	Nation	Victory Type	Loser	Nation
Hermann Baumann	Switzerland	Decision, 3–0	Garibaldo Nizzola	Italy
Celal Atik	Turkey	Fall	Gösta Frändfors	Sweden

Points

Rank	Wrestler	Nation	Start	Earned	Total
1st place, gold medalist(s)	Celal Atik	Turkey	1	0	1
2nd place, silver medalist(s)	Gösta Frändfors	Sweden	2	1	3
3rd place, bronze medalist(s)	Hermann Baumann	Switzerland	7	1	8
4	Garibaldo Nizzola	Italy	7	3	10
