= Eduardo Estrada =

Eduardo Estrada may refer to:

- Eduardo Estrada (cyclist)
- Eduardo Estrada (wrestler)
