= Westergren =

Westergren is a Swedish surname. Notable people with the surname include:

- Bo Westergren (born 1950), Swedish swimmer
- Carl Westergren (1895–1958), Swedish wrestler
- Frans Westergren (1914–1993), Swedish wrestler
- Håkan Westergren (1899–1981), Swedish actor
- Isaac Westergren (1875–1950), Swedish sprinter
- Meg Westergren (born 1932), Swedish actress
- Sofia Westergren (born 1974), Swedish politician
- Tim Westergren (born 1965), American businessman
