= Gyula Szilágyi =

Gyula Szilágyi may refer to:

- Gyula Szilágyi (wrestler) (1913–1957), a Hungarian wrestler
- Gyula Szilágyi (footballer) (1923–2001), a Hungarian footballer
