= Wrestling at the 1948 Summer Olympics – Men's Greco-Roman bantamweight =

Wrestling at the Olympics

Men's Greco-Roman bantamweight at the Games of the XIV Olympiad
- Venue: Empress Hall, Earls Court Exhibition Centre
- Dates: 3–6 August 1948
- Competitors: 13 from 13 nations

Medalists
1st place, gold medalist(s)		Kurt Pettersén	Sweden
2nd place, silver medalist(s)		Mahmoud Hassan	Egypt
3rd place, bronze medalist(s)		Halil Kaya	Turkey

The men's Greco-Roman bantamweight competition at the 1948 Summer Olympics in London took place from 3 August to 6 August at the Empress Hall, Earls Court Exhibition Centre. Nations were limited to one competitor. Bantamweight is the second-lightest category, including wrestlers weighing 52 to 57 kilograms (115 to 126 lb).

This Greco-Roman wrestling competition continued to use the "bad points" elimination system introduced at the 1928 Summer Olympics for Greco-Roman and at the 1932 Summer Olympics for freestyle wrestling, with the slight modification introduced in 1936. Each round featured all wrestlers pairing off and wrestling one bout (with one wrestler having a bye if there were an odd number). The loser received 3 points if the loss was by fall or unanimous decision and 2 points if the decision was 2-1 (this was the modification from prior years, where all losses were 3 points). The winner received 1 point if the win was by decision and 0 points if the win was by fall. At the end of each round, any wrestler with at least 5 points was eliminated.

== Results ==
=== Round 1 ===
Bouts

Winner	Nation	Victory Type	Loser	Nation
Reidar Merli	Norway	Decision, 3–0	Kurt Elias	Austria
Mahmoud Hassan	Egypt	Decision, 2–1	Kolle Lejserowitz	Denmark
Kurt Pettersén	Sweden	Fall	Francesco Suppo	Italy
Lajos Bencze	Hungary	Decision, 2–1	Taisto Lempinen	Finland
Halil Kaya	Turkey	Fall	Jésus Arenzana	France
Nikolaos Biris	Greece	Fall	Ken Irvine	Great Britain
Elvidio Flamini	Argentina	Bye	N/A	N/A

Points

Rank	Wrestler	Nation	Start	Earned	Total
1	Nikolaos Biris	Greece	0	0	0
1	Elvidio Flamini	Argentina	0	0	0
1	Halil Kaya	Turkey	0	0	0
1	Kurt Pettersén	Sweden	0	0	0
5	Lajos Bencze	Hungary	0	1	1
5	Mahmoud Hassan	Egypt	0	1	1
5	Reidar Merli	Norway	0	1	1
8	Kolle Lejserowitz	Denmark	0	2	2
8	Taisto Lempinen	Finland	0	2	2
10	Jésus Arenzana	France	0	3	3
10	Kurt Elias	Austria	0	3	3
10	Ken Irvine	Great Britain	0	3	3
10	Francesco Suppo	Italy	0	3	3

=== Round 2 ===
Bouts

Winner	Nation	Victory Type	Loser	Nation
Kurt Elias	Austria	Decision, 3–0	Elvidio Flamini	Argentina
Mahmoud Hassan	Egypt	Fall	Francesco Suppo	Italy
N/A	N/A	"both declared Losers"	Kolle Lejserowitz; Reidar Merli	Denmark; Norway
Kurt Pettersén	Sweden	Decision, 3–0	Lajos Bencze	Hungary
Taisto Lempinen	Finland	Fall	Jésus Arenzana	France
Halil Kaya	Turkey	Fall	Nikolaos Biris	Greece
Ken Irvine	Great Britain	Bye	N/A	N/A

Points

Rank	Wrestler	Nation	Start	Earned	Total
1	Halil Kaya	Turkey	0	0	0
2	Mahmoud Hassan	Egypt	1	0	1
2	Kurt Pettersén	Sweden	0	1	1
4	Taisto Lempinen	Finland	2	0	2
5	Nikolaos Biris	Greece	0	3	3
5	Elvidio Flamini	Argentina	0	3	3
5	Ken Irvine	Great Britain	3	0	3
8	Lajos Bencze	Hungary	1	3	4
8	Kurt Elias	Austria	3	1	4
8	Reidar Merli	Norway	1	3	4
11	Kolle Lejserowitz	Denmark	2	3	5
12	Jésus Arenzana	France	3	3	6
12	Francesco Suppo	Italy	3	3	6

=== Round 3 ===
Bouts

Winner	Nation	Victory Type	Loser	Nation
Elvidio Flamini	Argentina	Fall	Ken Irvine	Great Britain
Mahmoud Hassan	Egypt	Fall	Kurt Elias	Austria
Reidar Merli	Norway	Decision, 3–0	Kurt Pettersén	Sweden
Lajos Bencze	Hungary	Decision, 3–0	Halil Kaya	Turkey
Taisto Lempinen	Finland	Fall	Nikolaos Biris	Greece

Points

Rank	Wrestler	Nation	Start	Earned	Total
1	Mahmoud Hassan	Egypt	1	0	1
2	Taisto Lempinen	Finland	2	0	2
3	Elvidio Flamini	Argentina	3	0	3
3	Halil Kaya	Turkey	0	3	3
5	Kurt Pettersén	Sweden	1	3	4
6	Lajos Bencze	Hungary	4	1	5
6	Reidar Merli	Norway	4	1	5
8	Nikolaos Biris	Greece	3	3	6
8	Ken Irvine	Great Britain	3	3	6
10	Kurt Elias	Austria	4	3	7

=== Round 4 ===
Bouts

Winner	Nation	Victory Type	Loser	Nation
Mahmoud Hassan	Egypt	Fall	Elvidio Flamini	Argentina
Kurt Pettersén	Sweden	Fall	Taisto Lempinen	Finland
Halil Kaya	Turkey	Bye	N/A	N/A

Points

Rank	Wrestler	Nation	Start	Earned	Total
1	Mahmoud Hassan	Egypt	1	0	1
2	Halil Kaya	Turkey	3	0	3
3	Kurt Pettersén	Sweden	4	0	4
4	Taisto Lempinen	Finland	2	3	5
5	Elvidio Flamini	Argentina	3	3	6

=== Round 5 ===
Bouts

Winner	Nation	Victory Type	Loser	Nation
Mahmoud Hassan	Egypt	Decision, 3–0	Halil Kaya	Turkey
Kurt Pettersén	Sweden	Bye	N/A	N/A

Points

Rank	Wrestler	Nation	Start	Earned	Total
1	Mahmoud Hassan	Egypt	1	1	2
2	Kurt Pettersén	Sweden	4	0	4
3rd place, bronze medalist(s)	Halil Kaya	Turkey	3	3	6

=== Round 6 ===
Bouts

Winner	Nation	Victory Type	Loser	Nation
Kurt Pettersén	Sweden	Decision, 3–0	Mahmoud Hassan	Egypt

Points

Rank	Wrestler	Nation	Start	Earned	Total
1st place, gold medalist(s)	Kurt Pettersén	Sweden	4	1	5
2nd place, silver medalist(s)	Mahmoud Hassan	Egypt	2	3	5
