= Karim Raeisinia =

Iranian wrestler (born 1930)

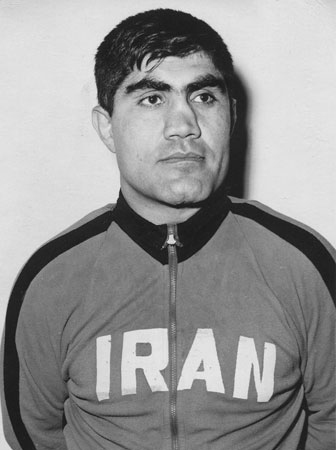

Personal information
- Born: January 1, 1930 (age 96)
Medal record
Representing Iran
Men's Freestyle wrestling
Deaflympics
| Gold medal – first place | 1957 Milan | 67 kg |
| Gold medal – first place | 1961 Helsinki | 67 kg |
Men's Greco-Roman wrestling
Deaflympics
| Gold medal – first place | 1957 Milan | 67 kg |
| Silver medal – second place | 1961 Helsinki | 67 kg |

Karim Raeisinia (Persian: کریم رئیسی‌نیا; born 1 January 1930 in Tehran) is an Iranian deaf wrestler and a Deaflympics gold medalist. He won four freestyle and Greco-Roman wrestling Deaflympics medals in 62–67 kg category of 1957 Milan and 1961 Helsinki. However, he was unable to gain a medal in the 73–79 kg category of the 1965 Washington DC games because of an injury and was ranked 4th in both Freestyle and Greco-Roman. He was a friend of Abolhassan Ilchi Kabir and Gholamreza Takhti. Mansour Raeisi is also his cousin.
