= Taisto =

Taisto is a Finnish word which is used as a masculine given name. In Finland, the name has a political sense and means "battle".

Notable people with the name include:

- Taisto Halonen (born 1960), Finnish wrestler
- Taisto Kangasniemi (1924–1997), Finnish wrestler
- Taisto Laitinen (1933–2022), Finnish athlete
- Taisto Lempinen (1914–1970), Finnish wrestler
- Taisto Mäki (1910–1979), Finnish athlete
- Taisto Miettinen (born 1965), Finnish athlete
- Taisto Reimaluoto (born 1961), Finnish actor
- Taisto Sinisalo (1926–2002), Finnish communist politician
- Taisto Tähkämaa (1924–2025), Finnish politician

== See also ==
- Taistoism
