= Wrestling at the 1948 Summer Olympics – Men's Greco-Roman heavyweight =

Wrestling at the Olympics

Men's Greco-Roman heavyweight at the Games of the XIV Olympiad
- Venue: Empress Hall, Earls Court Exhibition Centre
- Dates: 3–6 August 1948
- Competitors: 9 from 9 nations

Medalists
1st place, gold medalist(s)		Ahmet Kireççi	Turkey
2nd place, silver medalist(s)		Tor Nilsson	Sweden
3rd place, bronze medalist(s)		Guido Fantoni	Italy

The men's Greco-Roman heavyweight competition at the 1948 Summer Olympics in London took place from 3 to 6 August at the Empress Hall, Earls Court Exhibition Centre. Nations were limited to one competitor. Heavyweight was the heaviest category, including wrestlers weighing over 87 kilograms (191.8 lb).

This Greco-Roman wrestling competition continued to use the "bad points" elimination system introduced at the 1928 Summer Olympics for Greco-Roman and at the 1932 Summer Olympics for freestyle wrestling, with the slight modification introduced in 1936. Each round featured all wrestlers pairing off and wrestling one bout (with one wrestler having a bye if there were an odd number). The loser received three points if the loss was by fall or unanimous decision and two points if the decision was 2–1 (this was the modification from prior years, where all losses were three points). The winner received one point if the win was by decision and zero points if the win was by fall. At the end of each round, any wrestler with at least five points was eliminated.

== Results ==
=== Round 1 ===
Bouts

Winner	Nation	Victory Type	Loser	Nation
Josef Růžička	Czechoslovakia	Fall	József Tarányi	Hungary
Taisto Kangasniemi	Finland	Fall	Ernesto Noya	Argentina
Tor Nilsson	Sweden	Fall	Len Pidduck	Great Britain
Ahmet Kireççi	Turkey	Fall	Moritz Inderbitzin	Switzerland
Guido Fantoni	Italy	Bye	N/A	N/A

Points

Rank	Wrestler	Nation	Start	Earned	Total
1	Guido Fantoni	Italy	0	0	0
1	Taisto Kangasniemi	Finland	0	0	0
1	Ahmet Kireççi	Turkey	0	0	0
1	Tor Nilsson	Sweden	0	0	0
1	Josef Růžička	Czechoslovakia	0	0	0
6	Moritz Inderbitzin	Switzerland	0	3	3
6	Ernesto Noya	Argentina	0	3	3
6	Len Pidduck	Great Britain	0	3	3
6	József Tarányi	Hungary	0	3	3

=== Round 2 ===
Bouts

Winner	Nation	Victory Type	Loser	Nation
Guido Fantoni	Italy	Decision, 2–1	Taisto Kangasniemi	Finland
József Tarányi	Hungary	Fall	Ernesto Noya	Argentina
Moritz Inderbitzin	Switzerland	Decision, 3–0	Len Pidduck	Great Britain
Ahmet Kireççi	Turkey	Fall	Tor Nilsson	Sweden
N/A	N/A	Retired	Josef Růžička	Czechoslovakia

Points

Rank	Wrestler	Nation	Start	Earned	Total
1	Ahmet Kireççi	Turkey	0	0	0
2	Guido Fantoni	Italy	0	1	1
3	Taisto Kangasniemi	Finland	0	2	2
4	Tor Nilsson	Sweden	0	3	3
4	József Tarányi	Hungary	3	0	3
6	Moritz Inderbitzin	Switzerland	3	1	4
7	Ernesto Noya	Argentina	3	3	6
7	Len Pidduck	Great Britain	3	3	6
9	Josef Růžička	Czechoslovakia	0	3	3*

=== Round 3 ===
Bouts

Winner	Nation	Victory Type	Loser	Nation
Guido Fantoni	Italy	Fall	József Tarányi	Hungary
Ahmet Kireççi	Turkey	Decision, 3–0	Taisto Kangasniemi	Finland
Tor Nilsson	Sweden	Fall	Moritz Inderbitzin	Switzerland

Points

Rank	Wrestler	Nation	Start	Earned	Total
1	Guido Fantoni	Italy	1	0	1
1	Ahmet Kireççi	Turkey	0	1	1
3	Tor Nilsson	Sweden	3	0	3
4	Taisto Kangasniemi	Finland	2	3	5
5	József Tarányi	Hungary	3	3	6
6	Moritz Inderbitzin	Switzerland	4	3	7

=== Round 4 ===
After three rounds, the three medalists were decided and they wrestled to determine who received which medal. Kireççi had beaten Nilsson previously (in round 2), so the two would not wrestle each other again. The draw resulted in Fantoni facing Nilsson in round 4 and Kireççi in round 5. Nilsson would have taken bronze with a loss, but guaranteed himself at least silver by winning by fall.

Bouts

Winner	Nation	Victory Type	Loser	Nation
Tor Nilsson	Sweden	Fall	Guido Fantoni	Italy
Ahmet Kireççi	Turkey	Bye	N/A	N/A

Points

Rank	Wrestler	Nation	Start	Earned	Total
1	Ahmet Kireççi	Turkey	1	0	1
2	Tor Nilsson	Sweden	3	0	3
3	Guido Fantoni	Italy	1	3	4

=== Round 5 ===
Kirecci won the final match to take the gold medal; Fantoni's loss put him in third place.

Bouts

Winner	Nation	Victory Type	Loser	Nation
Ahmet Kireççi	Turkey	Decision, 3–0	Guido Fantoni	Italy
Tor Nilsson	Sweden	Bye	N/A	N/A

Points

Rank	Wrestler	Nation	Start	Earned	Total
1st place, gold medalist(s)	Ahmet Kireççi	Turkey	1	1	2
2nd place, silver medalist(s)	Tor Nilsson	Sweden	3	0	3
3rd place, bronze medalist(s)	Guido Fantoni	Italy	4	3	7
