= Viitala =

Viitala is a Finnish surname. Notable people with the surname include:

- Lennart Viitala (1921–1966), Finnish freestyle wrestler
- Pihla Viitala (born 1982), Finnish actress
- Walter Viitala (born 1992), Finnish footballer
