= Morgan Plumb =

Canadian wrestler (1913–1971)

Personal information
- Born: April 12, 1913 York, Toronto, Ontario, Canada
- Died: August 1, 1971 (aged 58) Oakville, Ontario

Sport
- Sport: Wrestling
Medal record
Men's Freestyle wrestling
Representing Canada
British Empire Games
Silver medal – second place	1950 Auckland	Lightweight

George Morgan Plumb (April 12, 1913 – August 1, 1971) was a Canadian wrestler. He competed in the men's freestyle lightweight at the 1948 Summer Olympics.
