= Kurt Elias =

Austrian wrestler

Personal information
- Nationality: Austrian
- Born: 1 April 1928

Sport
- Sport: Wrestling

Kurt Elias (born 1 April 1928) was an Austrian wrestler. He competed in the men's Greco-Roman bantamweight at the 1948 Summer Olympics.
