= Mahmoud Hassan (wrestler) =

Egyptian wrestler (1918–1998)

Olympic medal record

Men's Greco-Roman wrestling

Representing Egypt

Olympic Games
Silver medal – second place	1948 London	Bantamweight

Mahmoud Hassan (Egyptian Arabic: محمود حسن; December 15, 1918 – November 10, 1998) was an Egyptian Greco-Roman Bantamweight wrestler. He competed for Egypt in the 1948 Summer Olympics in London, earning a silver medal behind Kurt Pettersén of Sweden and Halil Kaya of Turkey. He also competed at the 1952 Summer Olympics.

Hassan was the flag bearer for Egypt in the London 1948 opening ceremony.

== See also ==
- List of Egyptians
