= Peter Luck (wrestler) =

British wrestler

Personal information
- Nationality: British (English)
- Born: 4 August 1925 Rochford, England
- Died: 29 June 2015 (aged 89) England

Sport
- Sport: Amateur wrestling

Peter Geoffrey Luck (4 August 1925 – 29 June 2015) was a British wrestler. He competed in the men's freestyle lightweight at the 1948 Summer Olympics.

1948 Summer Olympics (London):

- Event: Men's Lightweight, Freestyle
- Rank: 6th place
- Round One:
  - Match #7: Lost to Plumb (CAN) (3-0)
- Round Two:
  - Match #7: Lost to Bakos (HUN) (3-0)
- Final Standings: Eliminated in Round Two

Luck was a two-times winner of the British Wrestling Championships in 1948 and 1955.
