= László Bakos =

Hungarian wrestler

Personal information
- Nationality: Hungarian
- Born: 14 October 1919 Veszprém, Hungary
- Died: 18 March 1998 (aged 78) Budapest, Hungary

Sport
- Sport: Wrestling

László Bakos (14 October 1919 – 18 March 1998) was a Hungarian wrestler. He competed in the men's freestyle lightweight at the 1948 Summer Olympics.
