= Harry Peace =

Canadian wrestler

Personal information
- Born: 10 July 1913 Toronto, Ontario, Canada
- Died: 11 September 1987 (aged 74) Toronto, Ontario, Canada

Sport
- Sport: Wrestling

Henry Frederick Peace (10 July 1913 – 11 September 1987) was a Canadian wrestler. He competed in the men's freestyle welterweight at the 1948 Summer Olympics.
