= Len Pidduck =

British wrestler (1926–2014)

Personal information
- Nationality: British (English)
- Born: January 1926 Dover, England
- Died: 10 February 2014 (aged 88)

Sport
- Sport: Wrestling
- Club: Ashdown Club, Islington

Leonard "Len" Bertie James Pidduck (January 1926 – 10 February 2014) was a British wrestler who competed at the 1948 Summer Olympics.

== Biography ==
At the 1948 Olympic Games in London he participated in the men's Greco-Roman heavyweight event.

Pidduck was a two-times winner of the British Wrestling Championships at light-heavyweight in 1949 and super-heavyweight in 1951.
