= Elvidio Flamini =

Argentine wrestler

Personal information
- Born: 3 January 1925 Las Rosas, Argentina
- Died: 28 August 2008 (aged 83)

Sport
- Sport: Wrestling

Elvidio Flamini (3 January 1925 – 28 August 2008) was an Argentine wrestler. He competed in the men's Greco-Roman bantamweight at the 1948 Summer Olympics.
