= José Luis Pérez (wrestler) =

Mexican wrestler (1925–1963)

Personal information
- Born: 4 August 1925 Mexico City, Mexico
- Died: 11 May 1963 (aged 37) Mexico City, Mexico

Sport
- Sport: Wrestling

José Luis Pérez Valencia (4 August 1925 – 11 May 1963) was a Mexican wrestler. He competed in the men's freestyle lightweight at the 1948 Summer Olympics.
