= Walter McGuffie =

British wrestler

Personal information
- Nationality: British (English)
- Born: 7 December 1916 Bolton, England
- Died: 8 April 1996 (aged 79)

Sport
- Sport: Wrestling
- Club: Bolton Harriers

Walter McGuffie (7 December 1916 – 8 April 1996) was a British wrestler. He competed in the men's Greco-Roman flyweight at the 1948 Summer Olympics.

McGuffie was a four-times winner of the British Wrestling Championships in 1944, 1945, 1946 and 1949.
