= Ahmet Kireççi =

Turkish wrestler (1914–1978)

Medal record

Representing Turkey

Men's Greco-Roman wrestling

Olympic Games
Gold medal – first place	1948 London	+87 kg

Men's freestyle wrestling

Olympic Games
Bronze medal – third place	1936 Berlin	79 kg

Ahmet Kireççi (27 October 1914 – 17 August 1978), also known as Ahmet Mersinli, was a Turkish sports wrestler, who won the Olympic medal twice, the bronze medal in the Middleweight class of Men's Freestyle Wrestling at the 1936 Olympics and the gold medal in the Heavyweight class of Men's Greco-Roman category at the 1948 Olympics.

== Biography ==
Born in the southern city of Mersin, he began first boxing and then continued in athletics. He switched over to wrestling and took part in a yağlı güreş (oil wrestling) competition in Tarsus, where he became champion.

Ahmet Kireççi was sent to Istanbul to join the Wrestling Club of Kumkapı. In 1931, he was admitted to the national team, of which he was a member 17 years long. At 18 years of age, he became Balkan champion, a title he repeated twice more. With his bronze medal gathered at the 1936 Summer Olympic Games, he was the debut Turkish freestyle wrestler medallist and be an Olympic medallist in both wrestling styles.

Following President İsmet İnönü's suggestion at a reception after his return, Ahmet Kireççi accepted to change his family name officially to Mersinli, which was his nickname.

Kireççi died on 17 August 1978, at the age of 63, following a traffic collision in his hometown of Mersin. A statue of him erected in a corner near the harbour of Mersin commemorates the successful and popular wrestler.

== Achievements ==
- 1932 Balkan Championships - gold
- 1936 Olympics in Berlin, Germany - bronze (Freestyle Middleweight)
- 1937 World Championships - bronze
- 1940 Balkan Championships - gold
- 1948 Olympics in London, England - gold (Greco-Roman Heavyweight)
