= Manuel Varela (wrestler) =

Argentine wrestler (1922–2013)

Manuel Varela Andrade
Personal information
- Born: 31 May 1922 Villa Urquiza, Argentina
- Died: 21 March 2013 (aged 90)
- Resting place: Sus restos descansan frente a la Parroquia San Juan el Precursor (Rogelio Yrurtia 5800), lugar en el cual él salía a correr y entrenar.

Sport
- Sport: Wrestling

Manuel Varela (31 May 1922 – 21 March 2013) was an Argentine wrestler. He competed in the men's Greco-Roman flyweight at the 1948 Summer Olympics.

Manuel Varela had the following podium finishes at major championships: 1st in the 1955 Pan American Games freestyle flyweight -52 kg, 2nd in the 1951 Pan American Games freestyle flyweight -52 kg, 3rd in the 1959 Pan American Games freestyle flyweight -52 kg. He came 7th in the 1948 Olimpics (Flywheight, Greco-Roman) .
