= Hermann Baumann (wrestler) =

Swiss wrestler (1921–1999)

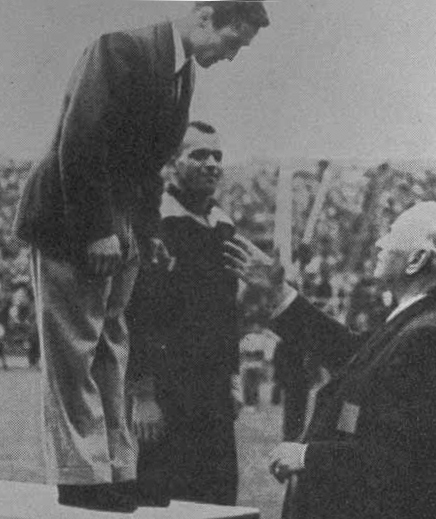
- Baumann (center) at the 1948 Olympics

Personal information
- Born: 23 January 1921 Switzerland
- Died: 19 February 1999 (aged 78)

Sport
- Sport: Freestyle wrestling
Medal record
Men's freestyle wrestling
Representing Switzerland
Olympic Games
Bronze medal – third place	1948 London	67 kg

Hermann Baumann (23 January 1921 – 19 February 1999) was a Swiss freestyle wrestler who won a bronze medal in the lightweight class at the 1948 Summer Olympics in London. Baumann died on 19 February 1999, at the age of 78.
