= Francesco Suppo =

Italian wrestler

Personal information
- Nationality: Italian
- Born: 7 September 1915 Sassello, Italy
- Died: 5 August 1995 (aged 79)

Sport
- Sport: Wrestling

Francesco Suppo (7 September 1915 – 5 August 1995) was an Italian wrestler. He competed in the men's Greco-Roman bantamweight at the 1948 Summer Olympics.
