= Ernesto Noya =

Argentine wrestler

Personal information
- Nationality: Argentine

Sport
- Sport: Wrestling

Ernesto Noya was an Argentine wrestler. He competed in the men's Greco-Roman heavyweight at the 1948 Summer Olympics.
