= Hwang Byeong-gwan =

South Korean wrestler (1919–1952)

Personal information
- Nationality: South Korean
- Born: 1919
- Died: February 1952 (aged 32–33)

Sport
- Sport: Wrestling

Hwang Byeong-gwan (1919 – February 1952) was a South Korean wrestler. He competed in the men's freestyle welterweight at the 1948 Summer Olympics.
