= Israel Sánchez (wrestler) =

Cuban wrestler

Personal information
- Nationality: Cuban
- Born: 6 July 1929
- Died: 13 October 2005 (aged 76)

Sport
- Sport: Wrestling

Israel Sánchez (6 July 1929 – 13 October 2005) was a Cuban wrestler. He competed in the men's freestyle lightweight at the 1948 Summer Olympics.
