= Harry Parker (wrestler) =

British wrestler

Personal information
- Nationality: British (English)
- Born: 9 April 1917 England
- Died: 7 August 2008 (aged 91) Ipswich, Queensland, Australia

Sport
- Sport: Wrestling

Harold "Harry" Parker (9 April 1917 – 7 August 2008) was a British wrestler. He competed in the men's freestyle flyweight at the 1948 Summer Olympics.

Parker was a six-times winner of the British Wrestling Championships in 1938, 1939, 1940, 1941, 1947 and 1948.
