= Gyula Bóbis =

Hungarian wrestler (1909–1972)

Personal information
- Born: 7 October 1909 Kecskemét, Hungary
- Died: 24 January 1972 (aged 62) Budapest, Hungary

Sport
- Sport: Wrestling
- Club: BVSC, Budapest; Budapesti Lokomotív
Medal record
Representing Hungary
Olympic Games
Gold medal – first place	1948 London	Freestyle, +87 kg
World Championships
Silver medal – second place	1950 Stockholm	Greco-Roman, +87 kg
European Championships
Bronze medal – third place	1937 Munich	Freestyle, +87 kg
Bronze medal – third place	1939 Oslo	Greco-Roman, +87 kg

Gyula Bóbis (7 October 1909 – 24 January 1972) was a Hungarian heavyweight wrestler. He competed at the 1936 Olympics in the Greco-Roman and at the 1948 Olympics in the freestyle division and won a gold medal in 1948. He also won a silver medal at the 1950 World Championships and bronze medals at the 1937 and 1939 European championships.

Bóbis was born in a family of eight siblings and later had five children himself, including the Olympic fencer Ildikó Farkasinszky-Bóbis. He worked for Hungarian railways and was an avid singer. While being a large and brave man he had a fear of mice.
