= Kolle Lejserowitz =

Danish wrestler

Personal information
- Nationality: Danish
- Born: 9 January 1923 Copenhagen, Denmark
- Died: 9 December 1985 (aged 62) Copenhagen, Denmark

Sport
- Sport: Wrestling

Kolle Lejserowitz (9 January 1923 – 9 December 1985) was a Danish wrestler. He competed in the men's Greco-Roman bantamweight at the 1948 Summer Olympics.
