= Kálmán Sóvári =

Hungarian footballer (1940–2020)

Personal information
- Full name: Kálmán Sóvári
- Date of birth: 21 December 1940
- Place of birth: Budapest, Hungary
- Date of death: 16 December 2020 (aged 79)
- Position: Defender

Senior career*
| Years | Team | Apps | (Gls) |
| 1958–1968 | Újpesti Dózsa | 192 | (4) |
| 1969–1973 | VM Egyetértés | 84 | (0) |
| Total | | 176 | (4) |

International career
| 1960–1966 | Hungary | 17 | (0) |
- * Club domestic league appearances and goals

Kálmán Sóvári (21 December 1940 – 16 December 2020) was a Hungarian footballer.

== Career ==
He played for Újpesti Dózsa as a defender. He played 17 games for the Hungary national football team. Sóvári is most famous for playing in two 1962 World Cup qualifying matches and one match in the 1966 FIFA World Cup finals.

His father, Kálmán Sóvári was an Olympic wrestler.
