= Louis Culot =

Belgian wrestler

Personal information
- Nationality: Belgian
- Born: 18 July 1915 Brussels, Belgium
- Died: 1978 (aged 62–63)

Sport
- Sport: Wrestling

Louis Culot (18 July 1915 – 1978) was a Belgian wrestler. He competed in the men's freestyle welterweight at the 1948 Summer Olympics. After his wrestling career, he played for many years at R.S.C. Anderlecht Rugby.
