= Malte Möller =

Swedish wrestler

Personal information
- Nationality: Swedish
- Born: 24 February 1914 Östra Göinge, Sweden
- Died: 13 October 1997 (aged 83) Stockholm, Sweden

Sport
- Sport: Wrestling

Malte Möller (24 February 1914 – 13 October 1997) was a Swedish wrestler. He competed in the men's Greco-Roman flyweight at the 1948 Summer Olympics.
