= Anant Bhargava =

Indian wrestler

Personal information
- Full name: Anant Ram Bhargava
- Nationality: Indian
- Born: 1923
- Died: 2 December 2005 (aged 81–82) Mughalsarai, India

Sport
- Sport: Wrestling

Anant Bhargava (1923 – 2 December 2005) was an Indian wrestler. He competed in the men's freestyle welterweight at the 1948 Summer Olympics.
