= Jésus Arenzana =

French wrestler (1918–2011)

Personal information
- Nationality: French
- Born: 7 June 1918 Calahorra, Spain
- Died: 22 March 2011 (aged 92)

Sport
- Sport: Wrestling

Jésus Arenzana (7 June 1918 – 22 March 2011) was a French wrestler. He competed in the men's Greco-Roman bantamweight at the 1948 Summer Olympics.
