= Ali Ghaffari =

Iranian wrestler

Personal information
- Nationality: Iranian
- Born: 1925
- Died: 2007 (aged 81–82)

Sport
- Sport: Wrestling

Ali Ghaffari (1925–2007) was an Iranian wrestler. He competed in the men's freestyle lightweight at the 1948 Summer Olympics.
