= Ken Irvine (wrestler) =

British wrestler (1923–2011)

Personal information
- Full name: Kenneth Hugh Irvine
- Nationality: British
- Born: 12 February 1923 London, England
- Died: 3 May 2011 (aged 88) Queensland, Australia

Sport
- Sport: Wrestling

Kenneth Hugh Irvine (12 February 1923 – 3 May 2011) was a British wrestler. He competed at the 1948 Summer Olympics and the 1952 Summer Olympics.

Irvine was a four-times winner of the British Wrestling Championships in 1949, 1952, 1953 and 1961.
