= Adolphe Lamot =

Belgian wrestler

Personal information
- Nationality: Belgian
- Born: 8 November 1911 Brussels, Belgium

Sport
- Sport: Wrestling

Adolphe Lamot (born 8 November 1911, date of death unknown) was a Belgian wrestler. He competed in the men's Greco-Roman flyweight at the 1948 Summer Olympics.
