= Abdallah Sidani =

Lebanese wrestler (born 1923)

Abdallah Sidani (born 1923) is a Lebanese retired wrestler who competed in the 1948 Summer Olympics.
