= Mohamed El-Ward =

Egyptian wrestler (born 1923)

Mohamed Abdel Hamid El-Ward
Personal information
- Nationality: Egyptian
- Born: 23 February 1923; Alexandria, Egypt

Sport
- Sport: Wrestling

Mohamed Abdel Hamid El-Ward (born 23 February 1923) was an Egyptian wrestler. He competed at the 1948 Summer Olympics and the 1952 Summer Olympics.
