= Kálmán Sóvári (wrestler) =

Hungarian wrestler (1910–1996)

Kálmán Sóvári (September 12, 1910 – December 18, 1996) was a Hungarian wrestler who competed in two Olympic games in 1936 and 1948. He competed in the 1936 Summer Olympics in Men's Freestyle Welterweight, but did not win a medal. At the 1948 Summer Olympics, he participated in the same event and placed 5th. He was born in Szombathely and died in Budapest.

His son, Kálmán Sóvári played on two FIFA World Cups as a football player.
