= Taisto Lempinen =

Finnish wrestler

Personal information
- Nationality: Finnish
- Born: 4 October 1914 Kymi, Finland
- Died: 2 April 1970 (aged 55) Kymi, Finland

Sport
- Sport: Wrestling

Taisto Lempinen (4 October 1914 – 2 April 1970) was a Finnish wrestler. He competed in the men's Greco-Roman bantamweight at the 1948 Summer Olympics.
