= Guido Fantoni =

Italian wrestler (1919–1974)

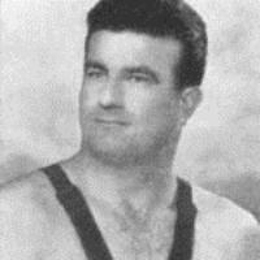

Personal information
- Born: 4 February 1919 Bologna, Italy
- Died: 28 December 1974 (aged 55) Bologna, Italy

Sport
- Sport: Greco-Roman wrestling
Medal record
Men's Greco-Roman wrestling
Representing Italy
Olympic Games
Bronze medal – third place	1948 London	Heavyweight
World Championships
Bronze medal – third place	1953 Naples	Heavyweight

Guido Fantoni (4 February 1919 – 28 December 1974) was a heavyweight Greco-Roman wrestler from Italy who won bronze medals at the 1948 Olympics and 1953 World Championships.
