= Moritz Inderbitzin =

Swiss wrestler

Personal information
- Nationality: Swiss
- Born: 24 September 1921
- Died: 21 October 1993 (aged 72)

Sport
- Sport: Wrestling

Moritz Inderbitzin (24 September 1921 – 21 October 1993) was a Swiss wrestler. He competed in the men's Greco-Roman heavyweight at the 1948 Summer Olympics.
