= Frans Westergren =

Swedish wrestler (1914–1993)

Personal information
- Nationality: Swedish
- Born: 20 April 1914 Malmö, Sweden
- Died: 2 March 1993 (aged 78) Malmö, Sweden

Sport
- Sport: Wrestling

Frans Westergren (20 April 1914 – 2 March 1993) was a Swedish wrestler. He competed in the men's freestyle welterweight at the 1948 Summer Olympics.
