= Kim Seog-yeong =

South Korean wrestler

Personal information
- Nationality: South Korean

Sport
- Sport: Wrestling

Kim Seog-yeong was a South Korean wrestler. He competed in the men's freestyle lightweight at the 1948 Summer Olympics.
