= Abolhassan Ilchi-Kabir =

Iranian wrestler (born 1938)

Medal record

Representing Iran

Men's Freestyle wrestling

Deaflympics
Gold medal – first place	1965 Washington DC	57 kg
Bronze medal – third place	1961 Helsinki	57 kg

Men's Greco-Roman wrestling

Deaflympics
Gold medal – first place	1965 Washington DC	57 kg
Bronze medal – third place	1961 Helsinki	57 kg

Abolhassan Ilchi-Kabir (Persian: ابوالحسن ایلچی کبیر; born 1938) was an Iranian deaf Wrestler and Deaflympics Gold-Medalist. Iran Wrestling Federation has named Iranian deaf Wrestlers championship "Haj-Ali Eftekhar & Abolhassan Ilchi Kabir Cup" to honor him.
