= Reino Kangasmäki =

Finnish wrestler (1916–2010)

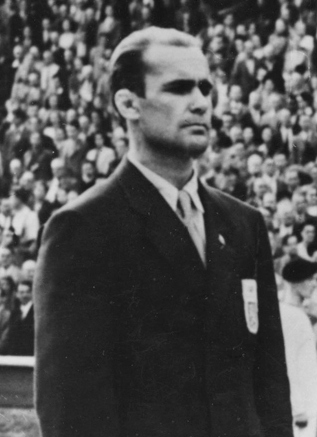
- Kangasmäki at the 1948 Summer Olympics

Personal information
- Born: 2 July 1916 Kokkola, Finland
- Died: 26 September 2010 (aged 94) Vaasa, Finland
- Height: 162 cm (5 ft 4 in)
- Weight: 52–55 kg (115–121 lb)

Sport
- Sport: Greco-Roman wrestling
- Club: TUL; Vaasan Toverit
Medal record
Men's Greco-Roman wrestling
Representing Finland
Olympic Games
| Bronze medal – third place | 1948 London | 52 kg |

Reino Kalervo Kangasmäki (2 July 1916 – 26 September 2010) was a journalist and a Greco-Roman wrestler from Finland. He won a bronze medal in the flyweight class at the 1948 Summer Olympics, his only major international tournament. At national championships Kangasmäki placed third in 1943 and second in 1947.

Kangasmäki was born in a family of a lumberjack. He started training in wrestling around 1935 and retired in 1951. In 1953, he started as a journalist for the newspaper Kansan Ääni, and eventually became its chief editor.
