= Edmond Faure =

French wrestler

Personal information
- Nationality: French
- Born: 5 June 1927 Clermont-Ferrand, France
- Died: 13 February 2008 (aged 80)

Sport
- Sport: Wrestling

Edmond Faure (5 June 1927 – 13 February 2008) was a French wrestler. He competed at the 1948 Summer Olympics and the 1952 Summer Olympics.
