= József Tarányi =

Hungarian wrestler

Personal information
- Nationality: Hungarian
- Born: 21 March 1912 Budapest, Austria-Hungary
- Died: 21 February 1964 (aged 52) Debrecen, Hungary

Sport
- Sport: Wrestling

József Tarányi (21 March 1912 – 21 February 1964) was a Hungarian wrestler. He competed in two events at the 1948 Summer Olympics.
