= Roland Baudric =

French wrestler

Personal information
- Nationality: French
- Born: January 25, 1925 Bordeaux, Gironde, France
- Died: November 21, 2012 (aged 87) Langon, Gironde, France

Sport
- Sport: Wrestling

Roland Georges Baudric (25 January 1925 – 21 November 2012) was a French wrestler. He competed in the men's freestyle flyweight at the 1948 Summer Olympics.
