= Banta Singh =

Indian wrestler (born 1924)

Personal information
- Nationality: Indian
- Born: 1924

Sport
- Sport: Wrestling

Banta Singh (born 1924) was an Indian wrestler. He competed in the men's freestyle lightweight at the 1948 Summer Olympics.
