= Kenan Olcay =

Turkish wrestler (born 1913)

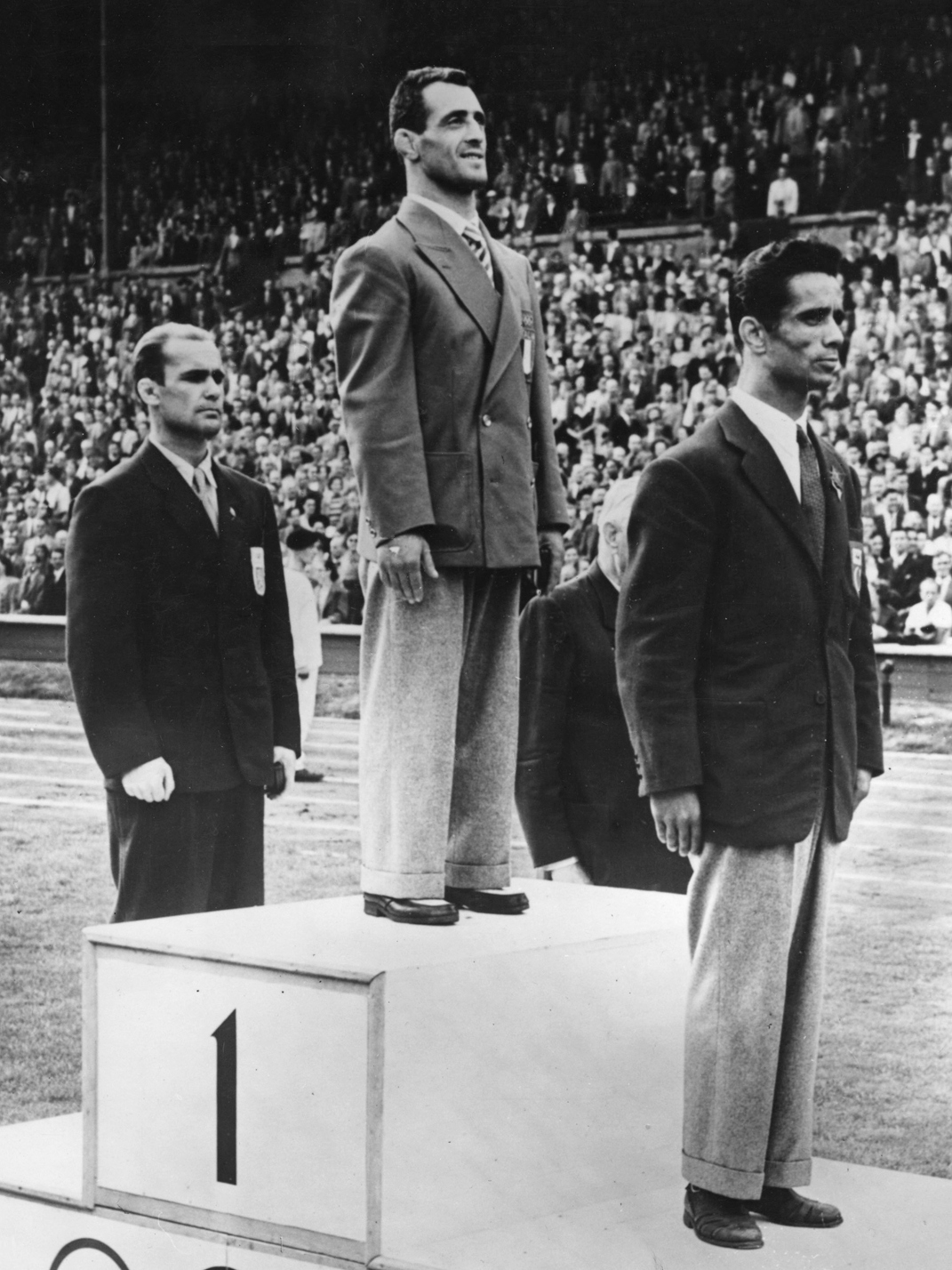
- Olcay (right) at the 1948 Olympics

Personal information
- Born: 30 November 1913
- Died: before 2013

Sport
- Sport: Greco-Roman wrestling
Medal record
Men's Greco-Roman wrestling
Representing Turkey
Olympic Games
Silver medal – second place	1948 London	52 kg

Kenan Olcay (30 November 1913 – before 2013) was a Turkish Greco-Roman wrestler. He won a silver medal in the flyweight class at the 1948 Olympics. Olcay died prior to 2013.
