= Jim Armstrong (wrestler) =

Australian rugby league footballer and wrestler

- Born: 14 July 1917; Albury, New South Wales
- Died: 8 July 1981 (aged 63)
- Other name: Big Jim
- Sports career
Medal record
Men's freestyle wrestling
Representing Australia
Olympic Games
Bronze medal – third place	1948 London	Heavyweight
British Empire Games
Gold medal – first place	1950 Auckland	Heavyweight
British Empire and Commonwealth Games
Bronze medal – third place	1962 Perth	Light Heavyweight
- Rugby league career

Playing information
- Position: Prop
Club
Years	Team	Pld	T	G	FG	P
1939–1947	South Sydney	83	28	4	0	92
Representative
Years	Team	Pld	T	G	FG	P
1946	Australia	1	0	0	0	0
1946	NSW	2	0	0	0	0
- Source: Rugby League Project

James Michael Armstrong (14 July 1917 – 8 July 1981) was a great Australian sport wrestler and rugby league player. In wrestling, he won a bronze medal at the 1948 Summer Olympics, a gold medal at the 1950 British Empire Games and a bronze medal at the 1962 British Empire and Commonwealth Games. He represented South Sydney, New South Wales and Australia in a nine-year top-level rugby league career. Armstrong served as an officer in the New South Wales Police Force, retiring at the rank of inspector.

== Early life ==
He was born in Albury, New South Wales, and was educated in Junee and Wagga Wagga. He joined the New South Wales Police Force at the age of 20.

== Rugby league career ==
Armstrong played for Waratahs in Wagga Wagga before moving to Sydney with the police force. In Sydney, Armstrong joined South Sydney, where he made his first grade debut in 1939.

Armstrong was selected to play for Australia against Great Britain as a front row forward in the third and deciding Ashes test in 1946, becoming Kangaroo No. 233.

== Wrestling career ==
He won a bronze medal in freestyle wrestling, heavyweight class, at the 1948 Summer Olympics in London.

At the 1950 British Empire Games Armstrong won the heavyweight wrestling gold medal.

At the 1962 British Empire and Commonwealth Games Armstrong won the light heavyweight wrestling bronze medal.
