= Leland Merrill =

American wrestler

Personal information
- Born: October 4, 1920 Danville, Illinois, U.S.
- Died: July 28, 2009 (aged 88) Princeton, New Jersey, U.S.
- Home town: Parkersburg, West Virginia, U.S.

Sport
- Country: United States
- Sport: Wrestling
- Events: Freestyle and Folkstyle
- College team: Michigan State
- Club: New York Athletic Club
- Team: USA
Medal record
Men's freestyle wrestling
Representing the United States
Olympic Games
Bronze medal – third place	1948 London	73 kg

Leland Gilbert Merrill, Jr. (October 4, 1920 – July 28, 2009) was an American wrestler who competed in the 1948 Summer Olympics, for the United States.

He was born in Danville, Illinois and grew up in Parkersburg, West Virginia. Leland wrestled collegiately at Michigan State University, where his senior year he was team captain and finished third at the NCAA Wrestling championships. In 1948, he won the bronze medal in the freestyle welterweight competition.

Merrill was West Virginia's first Olympic medal winner and the state's first Olympian.
