= Billy Jernigan =

American wrestler (1923–1997)

Personal information
- Born: September 8, 1923 Tulsa, Oklahoma, U.S.
- Died: March 2, 1997 (aged 73) Wagoner, Oklahoma, U.S.

Sport
- Country: United States
- Sport: Wrestling
- Events: Freestyle and Folkstyle
- College team: Oklahoma A&M
- Team: USA
Medal record
Collegiate Wrestling
Representing Oklahoma A&M
NCAA Championships
Silver medal – second place	1947 Champaign	121 lb
Bronze medal – third place	1948 Bethlehem	114 lb

Billy Jernigan (September 8, 1923 – March 2, 1997) was an American wrestler. He competed in the men's freestyle flyweight division at the 1948 Summer Olympics.
