= Mansour Raeisi =

Iranian wrestler (1928–1980)

Medal record

Representing Iran

Men's freestyle wrestling

European Championships
Silver medal – second place	1949 Istanbul	52 kg

Mansour Raeisi (Persian: منصور رئیسی; 1928–1980) was an Iranian Olympic Freestyle Wrestler and FILA International Referee. He is one of the most notable Iranian wrestlers of his generation.

== Biography ==
Raeisi represented Iran at 1948 Summer Olympics –the first appearance of Iranian wrestlers in an International competition– and had the best performance among Iranian wrestlers in the games, losing semifinal to Turkish silver-medalist Halit Balamir and placing in the 4th place.

He also coached Iran national freestyle wrestling athletes in 1967 World Wrestling Championships.

Deaflympics champion Karim Raeisinia is his cousin.
