= Garibaldo Nizzola =

Italian wrestler (1927–2012)

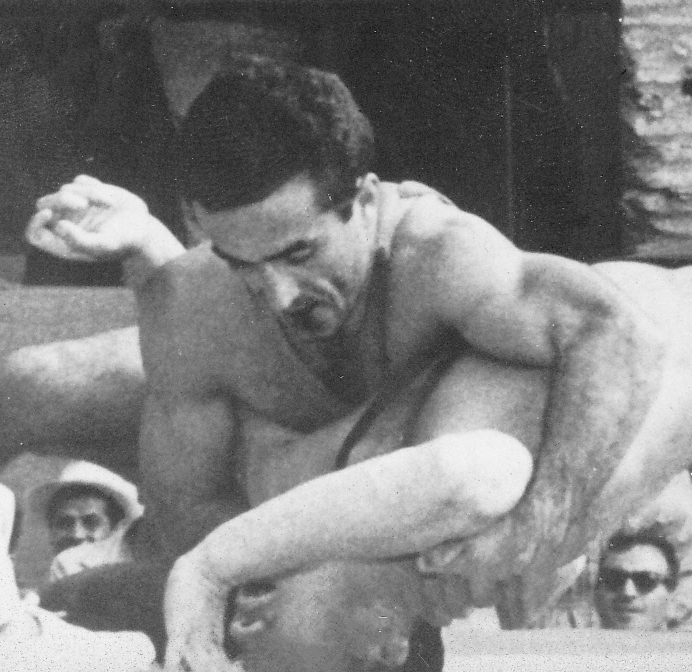
- Garibaldo Nizzola (top) at the 1960 Olympics

Personal information
- Born: 3 December 1927 Genoa, Italy
- Died: 26 December 2012 (aged 85)

Sport
- Sport: Freestyle wrestling
- Club: Club Atletico Genovese
Medal record
Representing Italy
World Championships
Silver medal – second place	1951 Helsinki	-67 kg
World Cup
Bronze medal – third place	1958 Sofia	-73 kg
Mediterranean Games
Silver medal – second place	1951 Alexandria	-67 kg

Garibaldo Nizzola (3 December 1927 – 26 December 2012) was an Italian freestyle wrestler. He competed at the 1948, 1952, 1956 and 1960 Olympics in the lightweight division with the best achievement of fourth place in 1948. In 1951 he won silver medals at the world championships and Mediterranean Games. His father, Marcello Nizzola, won a silver medal in wrestling at the 1932 Olympics. He died on 26 December 2012 at the age of 85.
