= Willy Lardon =

Swiss wrestler (1916–1992)

Personal information
- Nationality: Swiss
- Born: 2 May 1916 Moutier, Switzerland
- Died: 14 July 1992 (aged 76) Moutier, Switzerland

Sport
- Sport: Wrestling

Willy Lardon (2 May 1916 – 14 July 1992) was a Swiss wrestler. He competed at the 1948 Summer Olympics and the 1952 Summer Olympics. Lardon died in Moutier, Switzerland on 14 July 1992, at the age of 78.
