= Gyula Szilágyi (wrestler) =

Hungarian wrestler (1913–1957)

Personal information
- Full name: Gyula Kálmán Szilágyi
- Nationality: Hungarian
- Born: 18 April 1913 Győr, Austria-Hungary
- Died: 18 August 1957 (aged 44) Budapest, Hungary

Sport
- Sport: Wrestling

Gyula Kálmán Szilágyi (18 April 1913 – 18 August 1957) was a Hungarian wrestler. He competed in the men's Greco-Roman flyweight at the 1948 Summer Olympics.
