= Halil Kaya =

Turkish wrestler (1920–2000)

Medal record

Men's Greco-Roman wrestling

Representing Turkey

Olympic Games
Bronze medal – third place	1948 London	57 kg

World Championships
Silver medal – second place	1950 Stockholm	57 kg

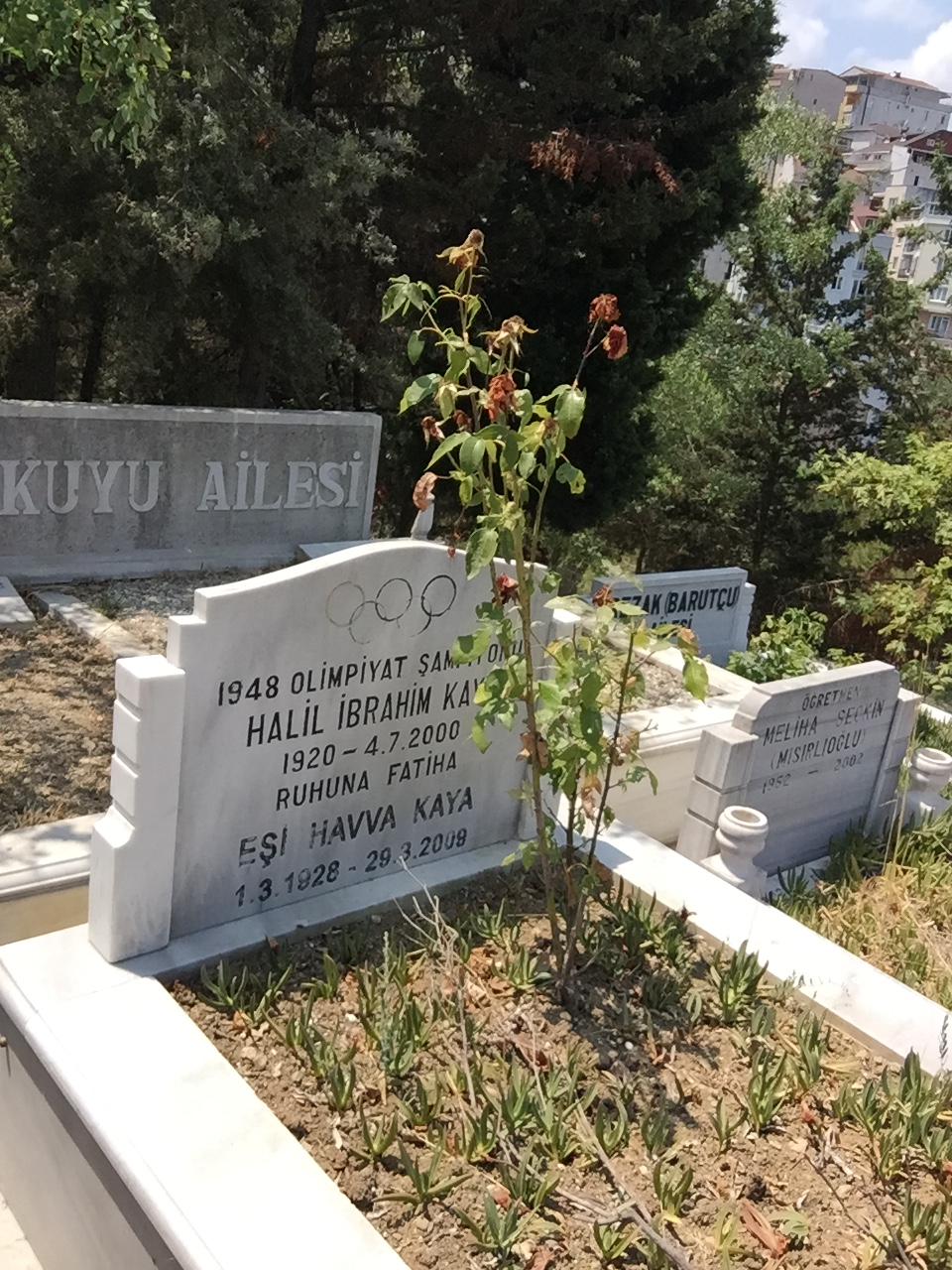
The grave of Halil İbrahim Kaya, Zincirlikuyu Cemetery.

Halil Kaya (1920 in Derepazarı – 4 July 2000) was a Turkish sport wrestler. He won a bronze medal in the Greco-Roman wrestling bantamweight class at the 1948 Summer Olympics in London.
