= Jean-Baptiste Leclerc =

French wrestler

Personal information
- Nationality: French
- Born: 10 March 1920; Éloyes, France
- Died: 3 March 2001 (aged 80); Créteil, France

Sport
- Sport: Wrestling

Jean-Baptiste Leclerc (10 March 1920 – 3 March 2001) was a French wrestler. He competed at the 1948 Summer Olympics and the 1952 Summer Olympics.
