= Sulo Leppänen =

Finnish wrestler (1916–2015)

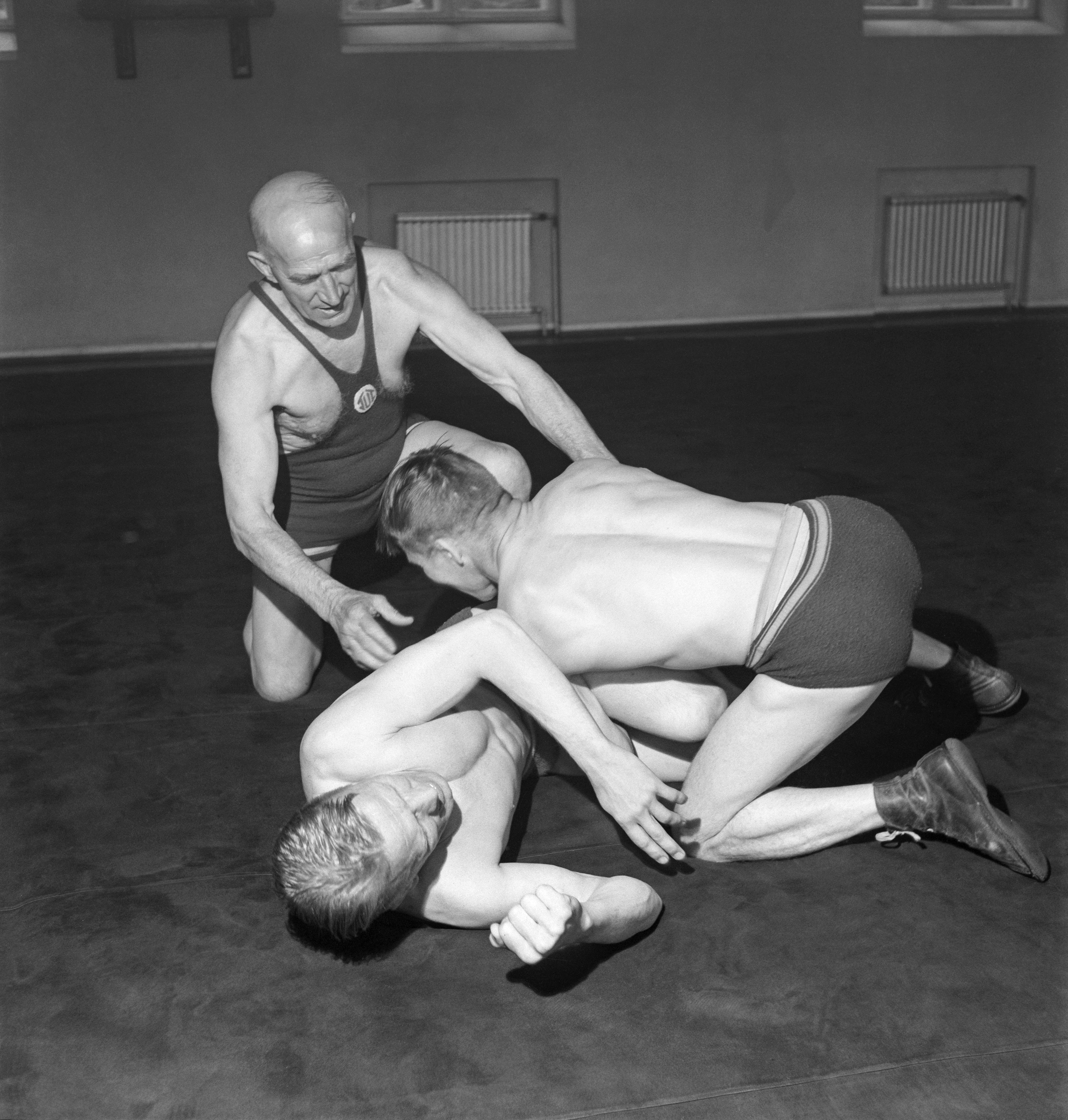
Wrestlers Sulo Leppänen and Niilo Turkkila train at the Pajulahti Sports Institute in Nastola, Finland, in 1952.

Sulo Leppänen (15 January 1916 – 12 March 2015) was a Finnish wrestler who competed in the 1948 Summer Olympics.
