= Abolghasem Sakhdari =

Iranian wrestler (1931/1932–2022)

Personal information
- Nationality: Iranian
- Born: 1931 or 1932 Neishabour, Iran
- Died: 18 August 2022 (aged 90) Mashhad, Iran

Sport
- Sport: Wrestling

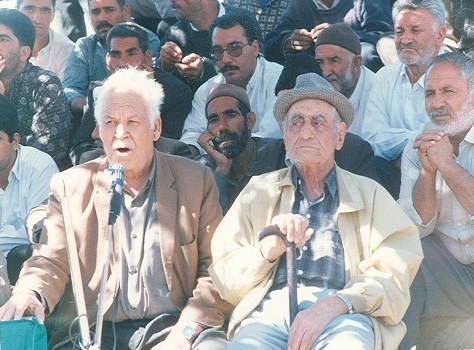
Wrestlers Sakhdari and Shoorvarzi in the pit of a Bachokhe wrestling match, Hajiabad Zabarkhan village

Abolghasem Sakhdari (Persian: ابوالقاسم سخدری; 1931 or 1932 – 18 August 2022) was an Iranian wrestler who competed at the 1948 Summer Olympics, where he finished 5th. He was born in Neishabour, Iran, and died in Mashhad on 18 August 2022, at the age of 90.
