= Tony Ries Sr. =

South African wrestler

Personal information
- Full name: Anthony Michael Tony Ries Sr
- Nationality: South African
- Born: 23 November 1913 Bloemfontein, South Africa
- Died: 13 May 1989 (aged 75) Uvongo, South Africa

Sport
- Sport: Wrestling

Tony Ries Sr. (23 November 1913 – 13 May 1989) was a South African wrestler. At 34, He competed in the men's freestyle lightweight at the 1948 Summer Olympics.
