= Adel Ibrahim Moustafa =

Egyptian Greco-Roman wrestler

Personal information
- Born: 18 January 1930
- Died: 28 October 2005 (aged 75)

Sport
- Sport: Greco-Roman wrestling

Adel Ibrahim Moustafa (Arabic: عادل إبراهيم مصطفى, 18 January 1930 – 28 October 2005) was an Egyptian wrestler. He competed at the 1948 Olympics in the welterweight freestyle wrestling and at the 1952 Olympics in the middleweight Greco-Roman event, but was eliminated in the preliminary bouts in both games. A 1955 Mediterranean Games Champion, he was one of three sons of Ibrahim Moustafa, a 1928 Olympic gold medalist in Greco-Roman wrestling.
