= Pietro Lombardi (wrestler) =

Italian wrestler (1922–2011)

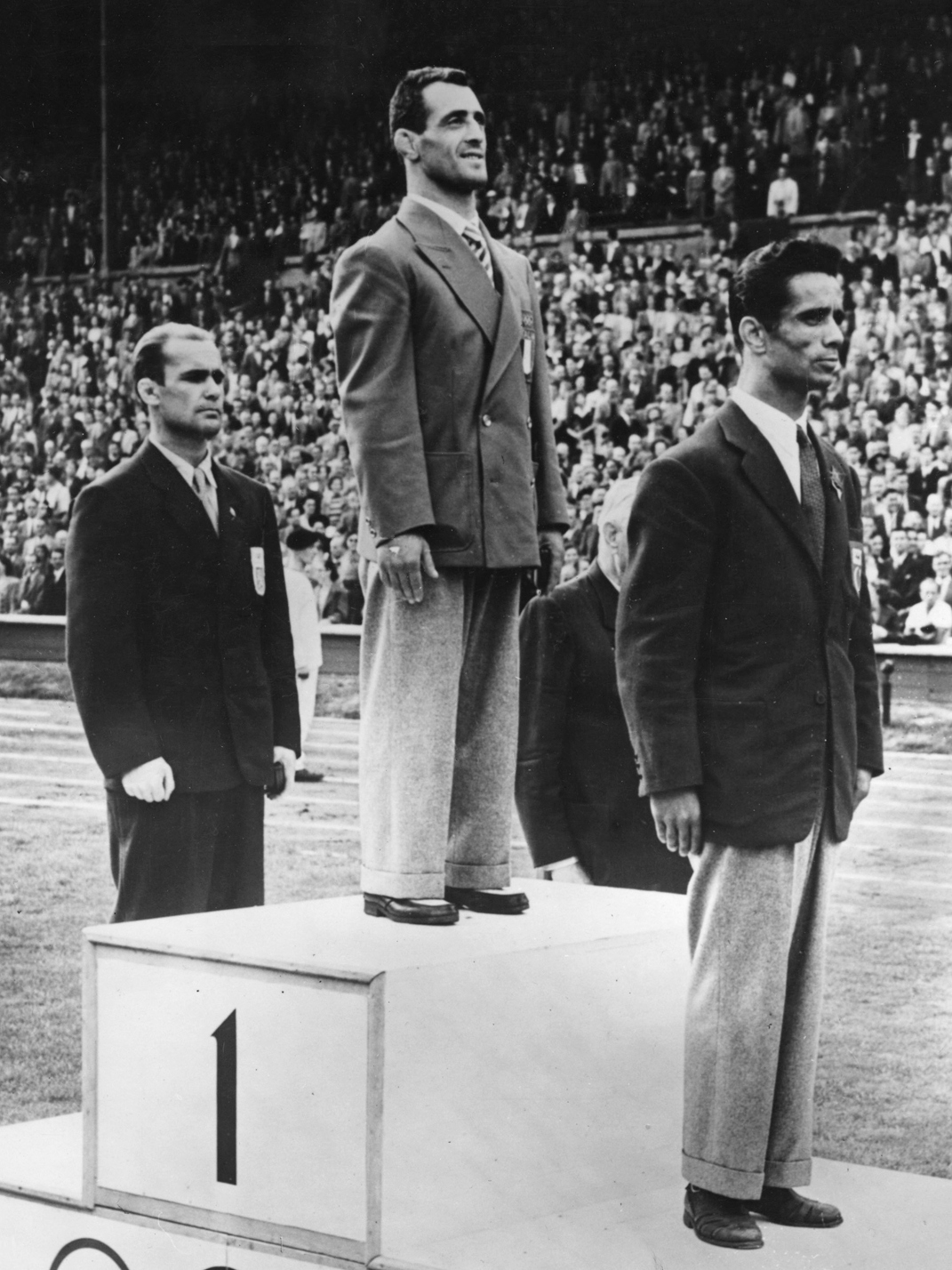
- Lombardi (center) at the 1948 Olympics

Personal information
- Born: 4 June 1922 Bari, Italy
- Died: 5 October 2011 (aged 89) Bari, Italy

Sport
- Sport: Greco-Roman wrestling
Medal record
Men's Greco-Roman wrestling
Representing Italy
Olympic Games
Gold medal – first place	1948 London	52 kg
World Championships
Bronze medal – third place	1950 Stockholm	57 kg
Bronze medal – third place	1955 Karlsruhe	57 kg

Pietro Lombardi (4 June 1922 – 5 October 2011) was a Greco-Roman wrestler from Italy. He who won a gold medal in the flyweight division at the 1948 Olympics and placed third at the world championships in 1950 and 1955.
