= Eduardo Estrada (wrestler) =

Mexican wrestler (born 1921)

Personal information
- Full name: Miguel Eduardo Estrada Ojeda
- Born: 12 October 1921 Morelia, Michoacán, Mexico

Sport
- Sport: Wrestling

Eduardo Estrada (born 12 October 1921) was a Mexican wrestler. He competed in the men's freestyle welterweight at the 1948 Summer Olympics.
