= Lennart Viitala =

Finnish wrestler (1921–1966)

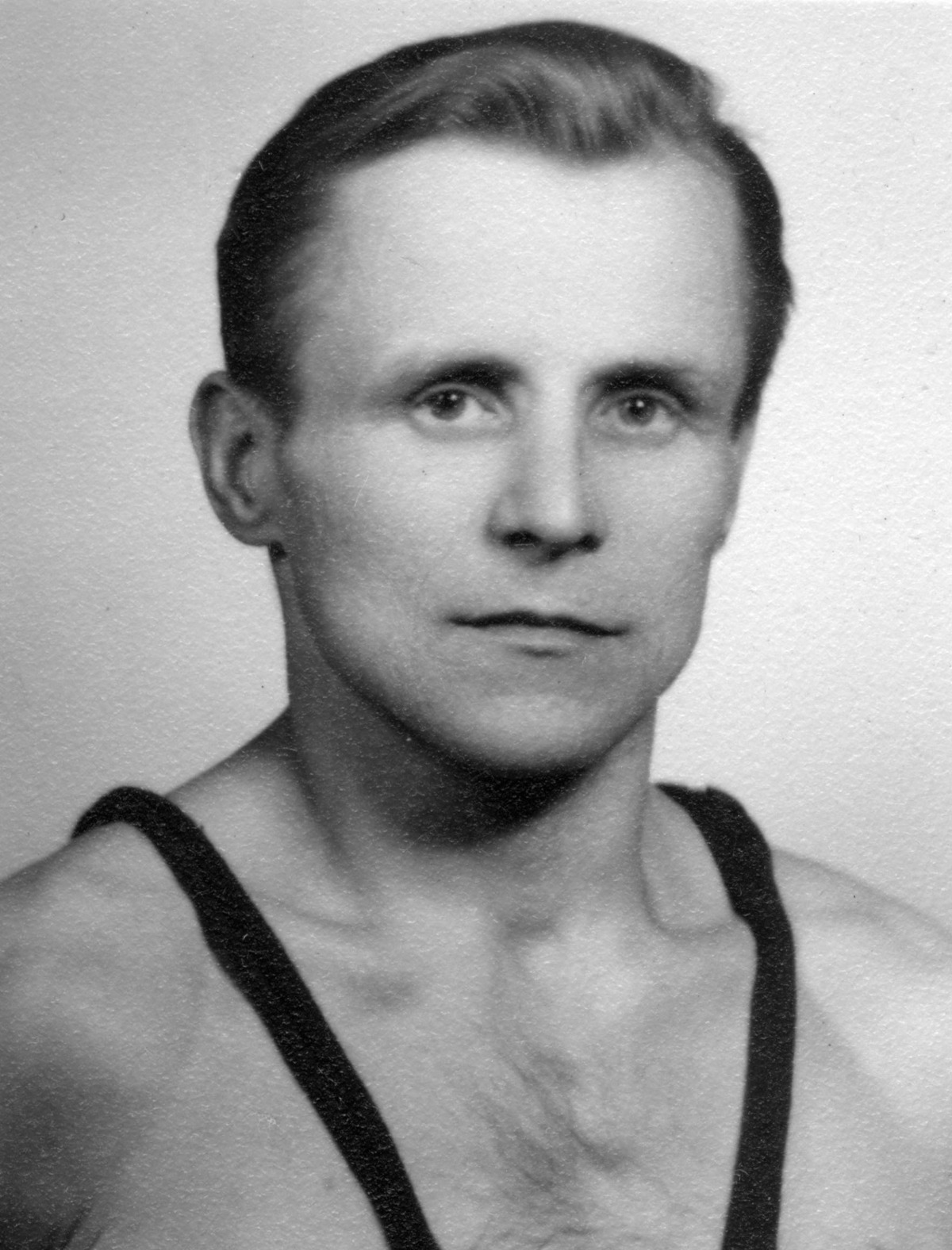

Personal information
- Born: 8 November 1921 Kankaanpää, Finland
- Died: 24 February 1966 (aged 45) Kangasala, Finland
- Height: 165 cm (5 ft 5 in)
- Weight: 52–60 kg (115–132 lb)

Sport
- Sport: Wrestling
- Club: Vaasan Toverit; TUL
Medal record
Men's freestyle wrestling
Representing Finland
Olympic Games
Gold medal – first place	1948 London	52 kg
European Championships
Gold medal – first place	1946 Stockholm	52 kg
Men's Greco-Roman wrestling
Representing Finland
European Championships
Bronze medal – third place	1947 Prague	52 kg

Vilho Lennart "Lenni" Viitala (8 November 1921 – 24 February 1966) was a Finnish flyweight wrestler who won gold medals in freestyle wrestling at the 1946 European Athletics Championships and 1948 Olympics. Domestically Viitala won five freestyle (1946–49, 1956) and one Greco-Roman title (1953). He was a carpenter by profession.
