= Gösta Frändfors =

Swedish wrestler (1915–1973)

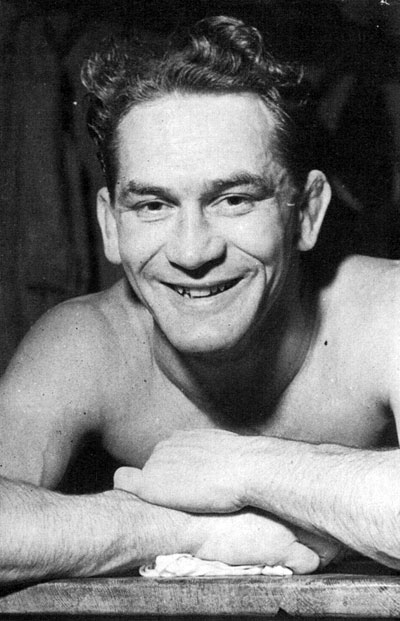
- Frändfors, circa 1947

Personal information
- Born: 25 November 1915 Stockholm, Sweden
- Died: 8 August 1973 (aged 57) Stockholm, Sweden

Sport
- Sport: Wrestling
- Club: Huddinge BK; Brandkårens IK, Stockholm
Medal record
Representing Sweden
Olympic Games
Silver medal – second place	1948 London	Freestyle 67 kg
Bronze medal – third place	1936 Berlin	Freestyle 61 kg
European Championships
Gold medal – first place	1947 Prague	Greco-Roman 67 kg
Silver medal – second place	1937 Munich	Freestyle 66 kg
Silver medal – second place	1946 Stockholm	Freestyle 67 kg

Gösta Valdemar Jönsson (later Frändfors, 25 November 1915 – 8 August 1973) was a Swedish wrestler. He competed at the 1936 and 1948 Summer Olympics and won a bronze and a silver medal in the featherweight and lightweight freestyle divisions, respectively. He won three more medal at the European championships of 1937–1947, competing in freestyle and Greco-Roman wrestling. In 1947, after becoming the European champion in the Greco-Roman 67 kg division, he was awarded the Svenska Dagbladet Gold Medal.

He was born Gösta Valdemar Jönsson, and in 1941 changed his last name to Frändfors. He retired from competitions in October 1950, and in 1951 played the a minor role in the film Spöke på semester.
