= Kurt Pettersén =

Swedish wrestler (1916–1957)

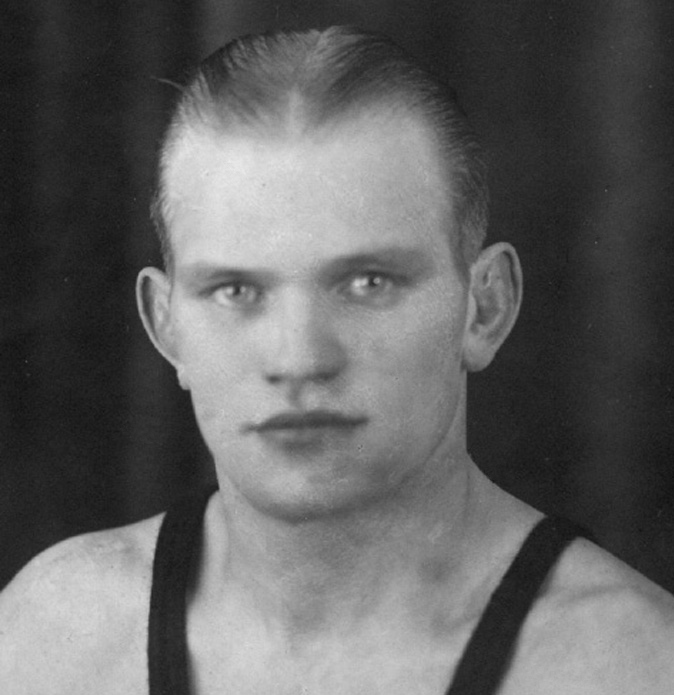

Personal information
- Born: 21 June 1916 Borås, Sweden
- Died: 15 November 1957 (aged 41) Borås, Sweden

Sport
- Sport: Wrestling
- Club: Borås BK
Medal record
Representing Sweden
Men's Greco-Roman wrestling
Olympic Games
Gold medal – first place	1948 London	57 kg
European Championships
Silver medal – second place	1938 Tallinn	56 kg
Silver medal – second place	1939 Oslo	56 kg
Men's freestyle wrestling
Silver medal – second place	1949 Istanbul	57 kg

Kurt Arne Pettersén (21 June 1916 – 15 November 1957) was a bantamweight Greco-Roman wrestler from Sweden who won a gold medal at the 1948 Summer Olympics. He won silver medals at the European championships in 1938 and 1939 (Greco-Roman) and 1949 (freestyle).

Kurt was born in a family of 11 siblings with Norwegian roots. Between 1936 and 1951 he won 22 Swedish titles in wrestling. He died of cancer aged 41.
