= Dick Garrard =

Australian wrestler (1911–2003)

Dick Garrard OBE
Personal information
- Born: 21 January 1911 Geelong, Australia
- Died: 3 March 2003 (aged 92)
Medal record
Men's freestyle wrestling
Representing Australia
Olympic Games
Silver medal – second place	1948 London	Welterweight
Commonwealth Games
Gold medal – first place	1934 London	Lightweight
Gold medal – first place	1938 Sydney	Lightweight
Gold medal – first place	1950 Auckland	Lightweight
Bronze medal – third place	1954 Vancouver	Lightweight

Richard Edward Garrard, OBE (21 January 1911 – 3 March 2003) was an Australian Olympic wrestler.

Garrard was born on 21 January 1911 in Geelong, Victoria. In a thirty-year career, from 1926 to 1956, Garrard lost only nine of 525 bouts, making him Australia's most successful sport wrestler ever. Between 1930 and 1956, he won every Victorian wrestling title and ten national titles in the lightweight and light welterweight divisions. This included not being beaten in a match in Australia for 25 years between 1930 and 1956.

In 1934, he competed in the first of what was to be four consecutive Commonwealth Games (then called the British Empire Games, and in 1954, the British Empire and Commonwealth Games) – an achievement amplified by the twelve-year gap between games from 1938 and 1950, due to World War II. Garrard won the gold medal at the 1934, 1938 and 1950 games, and a bronze at the 1954 games (where he was flag-bearer for the Australian team at the opening ceremony). He also competed in three Olympic Games: 1936 in Berlin, 1948 in London (where he won the silver medal in the welterweight division), and 1952 in Helsinki. He was forced to withdraw from the 1956 Olympics in Melbourne because of a dislocated shoulder and retired shortly after. He became an international judge and referee as well as chairman of the Olympic Wrestling Technical Committee. He was involved with the every Olympics until the 2000 Sydney Olympics (except for the 1980 Moscow Games which he boycotted) as either a judge, referee, section manager, mat chairman, a delegate to the Congress or simply as a VIP. He was manager of the Australian wrestling team at the 1972 Munich Olympics.

He was and still is the only Australian wrestler to ever contest an Olympic final.

Garrard was made a Member of the Order of the British Empire (MBE) in the 1970 Birthday Honours, and promoted to Officer of the Order (OBE) in the 1977 New Year Honours. He was awarded an Australian Sports Medal in 2000, and shortly afterwards took part in the Sydney Olympic torch relay, where he lit the community cauldron in Geelong.

Before his death on 3 March 2003 (aged 92), he was Australia's oldest living Olympic athlete.

Garrard was inducted into the Sport Australia Hall of Fame on 10 December 1985, and is the only wrestling inductee.
