= Tor Nilsson =

Swedish wrestler (1919–1989)

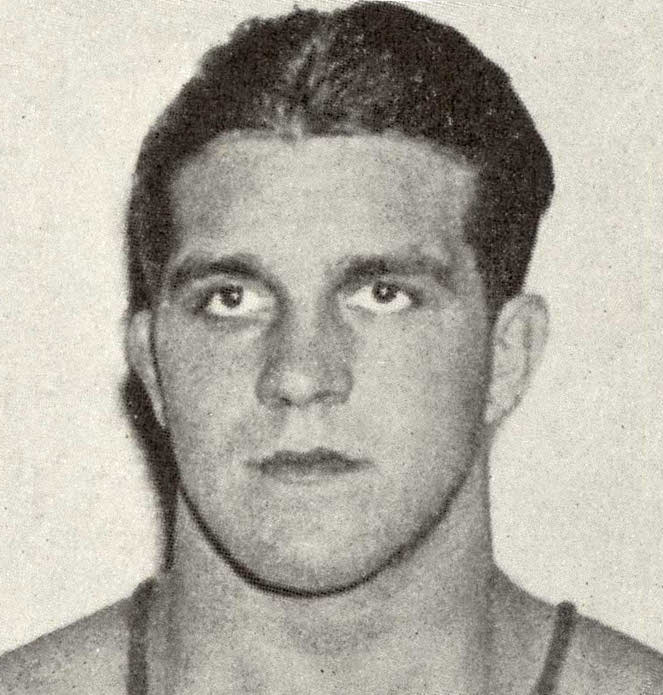

Personal information
- Born: 20 March 1919 Lund, Sweden
- Died: 13 April 1989 (aged 70) Lund, Sweden

Sport
- Sport: Greco-Roman wrestling
- Club: BK Balder, Lund
Medal record
Men's Greco-Roman wrestling
Representing Sweden
Olympic Games
Silver medal – second place	1948 London	Heavyweight

Tor Folke René Nilsson (20 March 1919 – 13 April 1989) was a heavyweight Greco-Roman wrestler from Sweden who won a silver medal at the 1948 Summer Olympics.
