= Thure Johansson (wrestler) =

Swedish freestyle wrestler

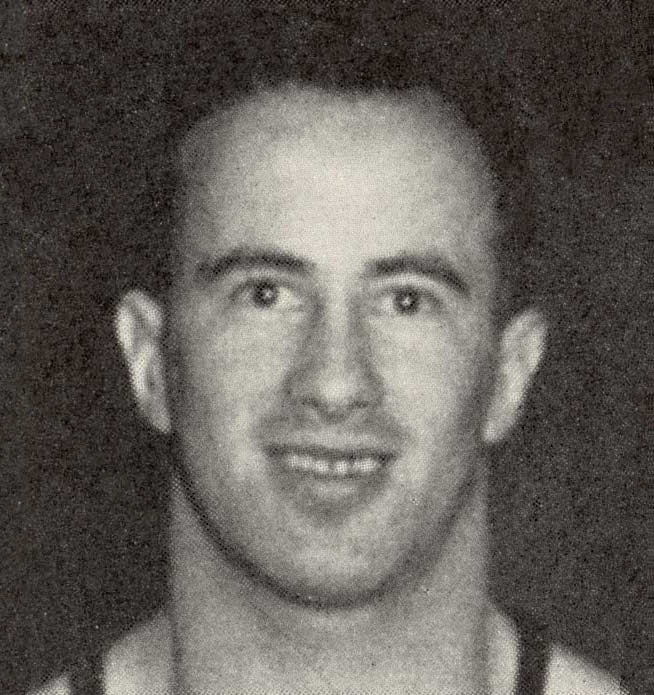

Personal information
- Born: 11 September 1912 Jukkasjärvi, Sweden
- Died: 12 March 1986 (aged 73) Arboga, Sweden

Sport
- Sport: Freestyle wrestling
- Club: Eskilstuna GAK
Medal record
Men's freestyle wrestling
Representing Sweden
Olympic Games
Bronze medal – third place	1948 London	Flyweight

Thure Emanuel Johansson (11 September 1912 – 12 March 1986) was a Swedish freestyle wrestler who won a bronze medal in the flyweight division at the 1948 Summer Olympics.
