= Mohamed Abdel-El =

Egyptian wrestler

Personal information
- Nationality: Egyptian

Sport
- Sport: Wrestling

Mohamed Abdel-El is an Egyptian wrestler. He competed in the 1948 Summer Olympics.
