= Frithjof Clausen =

Norwegian wrestler

Personal information
- Born: 13 March 1916 Kolbotn, Norway
- Died: 9 May 1998 (aged 82) Oslo

Sport
- Sport: Wrestling
- Club: Kolbotn IL

Frithjof Clausen (13 March 1916 – 9 May 1998) was a Norwegian wrestler. He won twelve national titles in wrestling, and competed at the 1948 and 1952 Olympic Games.

== Personal life ==
Clausen was born in Kolbotn, on 13 March 1916.

== Sports career ==
Clausen represented the clubs Kolbotn IL and Sporveiens AIL.

He won his first national title in 1939. His early career was spoiled by the Second World War, but in 1947 he won his second national title, and then became national champion in Greco-Roman wrestling in 1948, 1949, 1950, 1951,1952, 1954, 1955 and 1956. In 1949 and 1950 he also became national champion in freestyle wrestling, and thus won a total of twelve national titles. He was awarded the Kongepokal trophy in 1948 and 1956.

He competed in Greco-Roman wrestling at the 1948 Summer Olympics in London, where he placed sixth, and at the 1952 Summer Olympics in Helsinki.

Clausen died in Oslo on 9 May 1988.
