= Halit Balamir =

Turkish wrestler (1922–2009)

Olympic medal record

Men's freestyle wrestling

Representing Turkey

Olympic Games
Silver medal – second place	1948 London	52 kg

Halit Balamir (1922 – 2 March 2009) was a Turkish sport wrestler. He was born in Gümüşhane He won a silver medal in freestyle wrestling, flyweight class, at the 1948 Summer Olympics in London.
