= Bertil Antonsson =

Swedish wrestler (1921–2006)

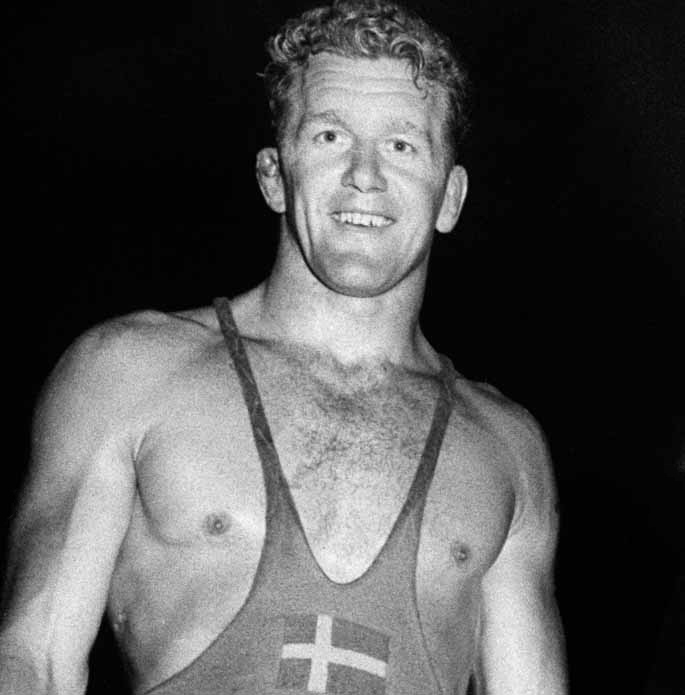
- Antonsson at the 1952 Olympics

Personal information
- Full name: Hans Bertil August Antonsson
- Born: 19 July 1921 Trollhättan, Sweden
- Died: 27 November 2006 (aged 85) Trollhättan, Sweden
- Height: 1.87 m (6 ft 2 in)
- Weight: 100 kg (220 lb)

Sport
- Sport: Wrestling
- Club: Trollhättans Atletklubb
Medal record
Men's wrestling
Representing Sweden
Olympic Games
Silver medal – second place	1948 London	Freestyle +87 kg
Silver medal – second place	1952 Helsinki	Freestyle +87 kg
World Championships
Gold medal – first place	1950 Stockholm	Greco-Roman +87 kg
Gold medal – first place	1951 Helsinki	Freestyle +87 kg
Gold medal – first place	1953 Naples	Greco-Roman +87 kg
Silver medal – second place	1954 Tokyo	Freestyle +87 kg
Silver medal – second place	1955 Karlsruhe	Greco-Roman +87 kg
European Championships
Gold medal – first place	1946 Stockholm	Freestyle +87 kg
Gold medal – first place	1949 Istanbul	Freestyle +87 kg

Hans Bertil August Antonsson (19 July 1921 – 27 November 2006) was a Swedish heavyweight wrestler. He competed at the 1948, 1952 and 1960 Summer Olympics in freestyle wrestling and won silver medals in 1948 and 1952. In 1956 he entered the Greco-Roman contest instead and finished fifth.

Antonsson took up wrestling at age 14, began competing aged 17, and retired at 47. Besides Olympic medals he won three world, two European and 24 national titles. At the 1953 World Greco-Roman Championships he dominated the reigning Olympic champion Johannes Kotkas, who was 30 kg heavier than Antonsson; he won the world title and was awarded the Svenska Dagbladet Gold Medal later that year.

In retirement, for many years Antonsson headed his native club Trollhättans and refereed wrestling competitions. His brother Bengt and nephew Hans were also prominent wrestlers.
