= Bert Harris (wrestler) =

Australian wrestler (1916–1982)

Personal information
- Born: 1916 New South Wales, Australia
- Died: 6 March 1982 (aged 65–66) Cooma, New South Wales, Australia

Sport
- Sport: Freestyle wrestling
Medal record
Representing Australia
British Empire Games
Gold medal – first place	1950 Auckland	Flyweight

Bertram Harris (1916 – 6 March 1982) was an Australian freestyle wrestler who won the flyweight division at the 1950 Empire Games and also competed in the flyweight division at the 1948 Summer Olympics, where he was eliminated in the second round.
