= India at the 1948 Summer Olympics =

- IOC code: IND
- NOC: Indian Olympic Association

in London
- Competitors: 79 (all men) in 10 sports
- Medals Ranked 22nd: Gold 1 Silver 0 Bronze 0 Total 1

Summer Olympics appearances (overview)
- 1900; 1904–1912; 1920; 1924; 1928; 1932; 1936; 1948; 1952; 1956; 1960; 1964; 1968; 1972; 1976; 1980; 1984; 1988; 1992; 1996; 2000; 2004; 2008; 2012; 2016; 2020; 2024; 2028

Other related appearances
- Pakistan (1948–pres.); Bangladesh (1984–pres.)

India competed at the 1948 Summer Olympics in Wembley Park, London, England. 79 competitors, all men, took part in 39 events in 10 sports. It was the first time that India competed as an independent nation at the Olympic Games. The 79 competitor Indian contingent won the country's first and only medal of the Olympics in field hockey.

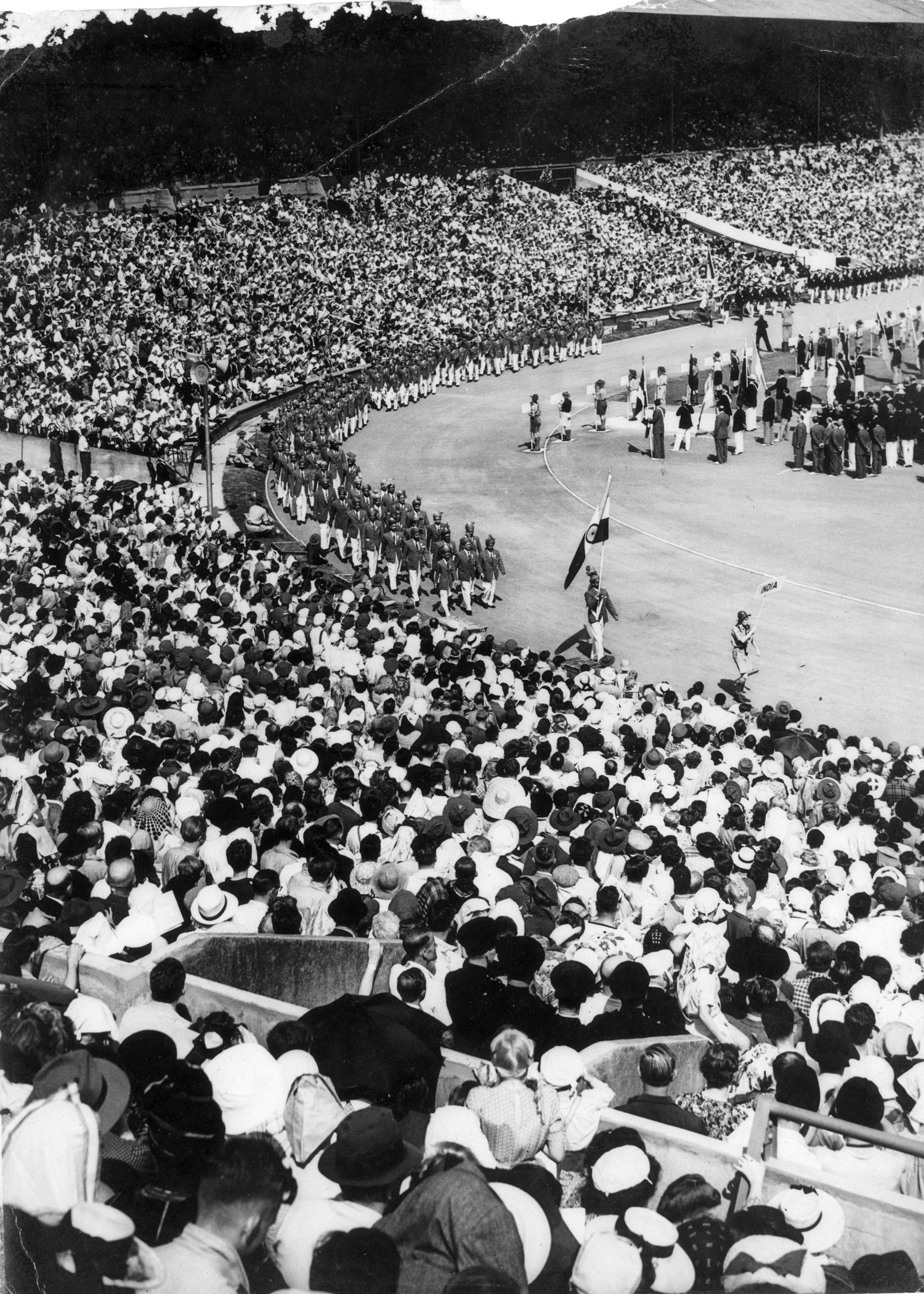
Indian Team in 1948

== Medalists ==
Medals by sport
Sport	1st place, gold medalist(s)	2nd place, silver medalist(s)	3rd place, bronze medalist(s)	Total
Field hockey	1	0	0	1
Total	1	0	0	1

Medal	Name	Sport	Event
Gold	Leslie Claudius; Keshav Dutt; Walter D'Souza; Lawrie Fernandes; Ranganathan Francis; Gerry Glackan; Akhtar Hussain; Patrick Jansen; Amir Kumar; Kishan Lal; Leo Pinto; Jaswant Singh Rajput; Latif-ur-Rehman; Reginald Rodrigues; Balbir Singh Sr. Randhir Singh Gentle; Grahanandan Singh; K. D. Singh; Trilochan Singh; Maxie Vaz	Field hockey	Men's Field hockey

== Competitors ==
Note: All times mentioned on this page are in British Summer Time (BST). Indian Standard Time (IST) = BST + 4:30hrs.

Sport	Men	Women	Events
Athletics	8	0	10
Boxing	7	0	7
Cycling	9	0	5
Field Hockey	20	0	1
Football	18	0	1
Swimming	7	0	5
Water polo	9	0	1
Weightlifting	2	0	2
Wrestling	6	0	6

== Athletics ==
Athlete	Event	Heat		Quarterfinals		Semifinals		Final	
Athlete	Event	Time	Rank	Time	Rank	Time	Rank	Time	Rank
Eric Prabhakar	Men's 100 metres	11.0	2	11.26	6	Did not advance			

Athlete	Event	Qualifying		Semifinal		Final	
Athlete	Event	Time	Rank	Time	Rank	Time	Rank
Jim Vickers	Men's 110 metres hurdles	14.7	1	15.09	4	Did not advance	

Athlete	Event	Qualifying		Final	
Athlete	Event	Time	Rank	Time	Rank
Sadhu Singh	Men's 10 kilometres walk	--	--	Did not advance	

Athlete	Event	Final	
Athlete	Event	Time	Rank
Sadhu Singh	Men's 50 kilometres walk	--	DNF

Athlete	Event	Final	
Athlete	Event	Time	Rank
Chhota Singh	Men's marathon	--	DNF

Athlete	Event	Qualifying		Final	
Athlete	Event	Score	Rank	Score	Rank
Gurnam Singh	Men's high jump	1.87	NP	1.80	18

Athlete	Event	Qualifying		Final	
Athlete	Event	Score	Rank	Score	Rank
Baldev Singh	Men's long jump	7.000	11	Did not advance	

Athlete	Event	Qualifying		Final	
Athlete	Event	Score	Rank	Score	Rank
Henry Rebello	Men's triple jump	14.650	5	-	NM

Athlete	Event	Qualifying		Final	
Athlete	Event	Score	Rank	Score	Rank
Nat Singh Somnath	Men's hammer throw	41.36	23	Did not advance	

== Boxing ==
Men

Athlete	Event	Round of 32	Round of 16	Quarterfinals	Semifinals	Final	
Athlete	Event	Opposition Result	Opposition Result	Opposition Result	Opposition Result	Opposition Result	Rank
Rabin Bhatta	Flyweight	Bye	Frankie Sodano (USA); L KO1	Did not advance			
Babu Lall	Bantamweight	Allan Monteiro (PAK); W RSC1	Juan Venegas (PUR); L PTS	Did not advance			
Benoy Bose	Featherweight	Francisco Núñez (ARG); L PTS	Did not advance				
Gene Raymond	Lightweight	Svend Wad (DEN); L PTS	Did not advance				
Robert Cranston	Welterweight	Aurelio Díaz (ESP); L PTS	Did not advance				
John Nuttall	Middleweight	Bye	Ivano Fontana (ITA); L PTS	Did not advance			
Mac Joachim	Light heavyweight	Franciszek Szymura (POL); L PTS	Did not advance				

== Cycling ==
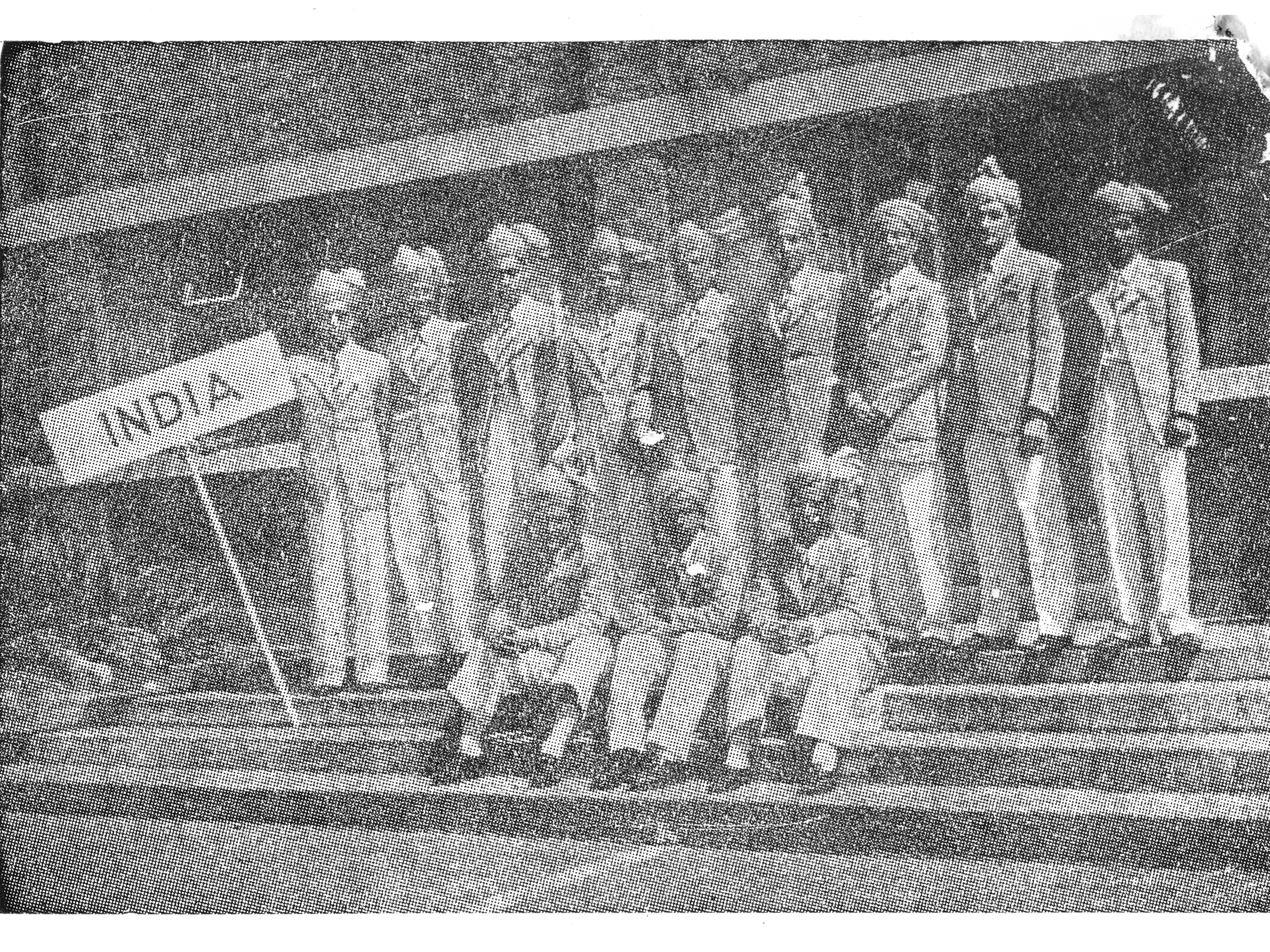
Indian Cycle Team 1948 Olympics--Mistry, Amin, Noble, Saugar, Bhoot, Malcolm, Mehra, Mullaferoze, Sarkar, Pavri, Bysack, Havewala

India cyclists 1948-Havewala, Bhoot, Saugar, others

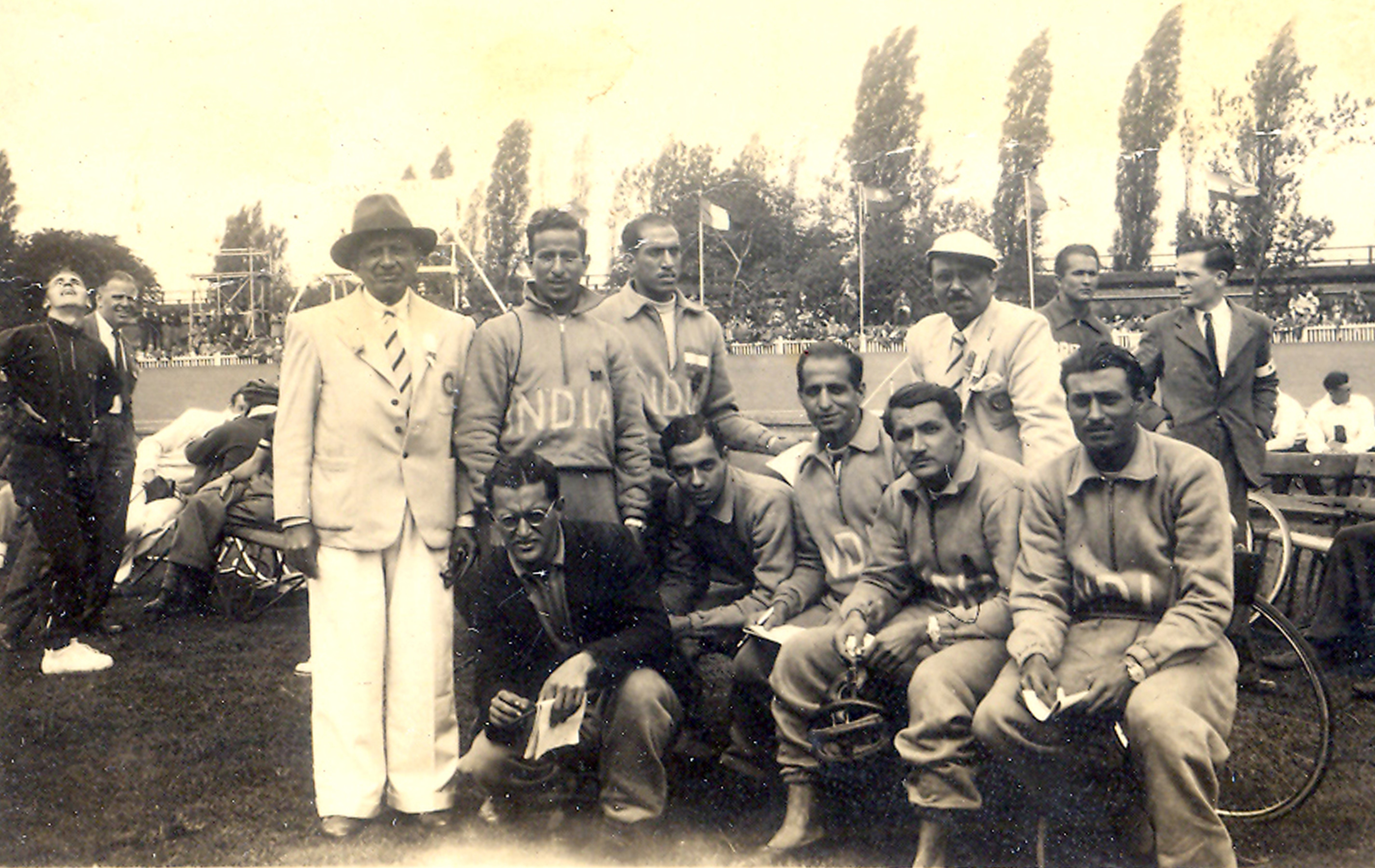
India cyclists 1948- Bhoot, Saugar, Malcolm, Mehra, others

India cyclists 1948

Ten cyclists represented India in 1948

Individual road race

- Bapoo Malcolm
- Raj Kumar Mehra
- Eruch Mistry
- Homi Powri (Pavri)

Team road race

- Bapoo Malcolm
- Raj Kumar Mehra
- Eruch Mistry
- Homi Powri (Pavri)

Sprint

- Rusi Mulla Feroze

Time trial

- Rohinton Noble

Team pursuit

- Adi Havewala
- Jehangoo Amin
- Rohinton Noble
- Piloo Sarkari (Sarkar)

Also represented India: Netai Chand Bysack

Sohrab Bhoot and Nariman Saugar were administrators for the cycling team.

== Field hockey ==
The Indian field hockey team defeated the British team to win the country's first gold medal at the 1948 Summer Olympics. It was the country's first Olympic gold medal since India became independent.

Squad

Leslie Claudius
Keshav Dutt
Walter D'Souza
Lawrie Fernandes
Ranganathan Francis
Gerry Glackan
Akhtar Hussain
Patrick Jansen
Amir Kumar
Kishan Lal (c)
Leo Pinto
Jaswant Singh Rajput
Latif-ur-Rehman
Reginald Rodrigues
Balbir Singh Sr.
Randhir Singh Gentle
Grahanandan Singh
K. D. Singh (vc)
Trilochan Singh
Maxie Vaz

Group A matches

Rank	Team	Pld	W	D	L	GF	GA	Pts	(India)	(Argentina)	(Austria)	(Spain)
1.	India	3	3	0	0	19	1	6	X	9:1	8:0	2:0
2.	Argentina	3	1	1	1	5	12	3	1:9	X	1:1	3:2
3.	Austria	3	0	2	1	2	10	2	0:8	1:1	X	1:1
4.	Spain	3	0	1	2	3	6	1	0:2	2:3	1:1	X

Semi-finals

India	2 – 1	Netherlands

Final

India	4 – 0	Great Britain

== Football ==
Squad

Head coach: Balaidas Chatterjee

Pos.	Player	Date of birth	Age	Caps	Club	Tournament games	Tournament goals	Minutes played	Sub off	Sub on	Cards yellow/red
MF	Talimeran Ao	Jan 28, 1918	30	?	(India) Mohun Bagan A.C.	1	0	90	-	-	-
MF	A. Sattar Basheer	1924		?	(India) Mysore	1	0	90	-	-	-
FW	Robi Das			?	(India) Bhawanipore Club	1	0	90	-	-	-
FW	Ahmed Mohamed Khan	Dec 24, 1926	21	?	(India) Mysore	1	0	90	-	-	-
DF	Saliendra Manna	Sep 1, 1924	23	?	(India) Mohun Bagan A.C.	1	0	90	-	-	-
FW	Sahu Mewalal	Jul 1, 1926	22	?	(India) Eastern Railway S.C.	1	0	90	-	-	-
DF	Taj Mohammed	1924		?	(India) East Bengal	1	0	90	-	-	-
MF	Mahabir Prasad	1918		?	(India) East Bengal	1	0	90	-	-	-
FW	Balaram Parab Ramchandra	1925		?	(India) Bombay F.C.	1	0	90	-	-	-
FW	Sarangapani Raman	1920		?	(India) Mysore	1	1	90	-	-	-
GK	Kenchappa V. Varada Raj	1923		?	(India) Mysore	1	0	90	-	-	-
	Stand-by players -
FW	K. P. Dhanraj			?	(India) Mysore	0	0	0	-	-	-
MF	S. M. Kaiser			?	(India) East Bengal	0	0	0	-	-	-
MF	Anil Nandy			?	(India) Eastern Railway S.C.	0	0	0	-	-	-
FW	Santosh Nandy	1932		?	(India) Eastern Railway S.C.	0	0	0	-	-	-
DF	T. M. Varghese "Papen"			?	(India) Bombay F.C.	0	0	0	-	-	-
GK	Sanjeeva Uchil			?	(India) ICL-Bengal Club, Bombay	0	0	0	-	-	-
MF	B. N. Vajravelu			?	(India) Mysore	0	0	0	-	-	-

First round

31 July 1948
18:30

France	2–1	India
Courbin 30'; Persillon 89'	Report	Raman 70'

Lynn Road Stadium, Ilford
Attendance: 17.000
Referee: Gunnar Dahlner (SWE)

== Swimming ==
Athlete	Event	Heat		Semifinal		Final	
Athlete	Event	Time	Rank	Time	Rank	Time	Rank
Sachin Nag	Men's 100 m freestyle	1:03.8	34	Did not advance			
Isaac Mansoor	Men's 100 m freestyle	1:06.4	38	Did not advance			
Dilip Mitra	Men's 100 m freestyle	1:06.9	39	Did not advance			
Bimal Chandra	Men's 400 metre freestyle	5:38.6	?	Did not advance			
Bimal Chandra	Men's 1500 metre freestyle	22:52.9	?	Did not advance			
Khamlillal Shah	Men's 100 metre backstroke	1:19.9	?	Did not advance			
Prahtip Mitra	Men's 100 metre backstroke	1:24.5	?	Did not advance			
Prafulla Mullick	Men's 200 metre breaststroke	3:14.9	?	Did not advance			

== Water polo ==
Indian water polo team ranked 9th in tournament.

Squad

Gora Seal
Samarendra Chatterjee
Ajoy Chatterjee
Suhas Chatterjee
Dwarkadas Mukharji
Durga Das
Jamini Dass
Sachin Nag
Isaac Mansoor
Jahan Ahir

Round One

Group C matches

Rank	Team	Pld	W	D	L	GF	GA	Pts	(Netherlands)	(India)	(Chile)
1.	Netherlands	2	2	0	0	26	1	4	X	12:1	14:0
2.	India	2	1	0	1	8	16	2	1:12	X	7:4
3.	Chile	2	0	0	2	4	21	0	0:14	4:7	X

Round Two

Group H

Rank	Team	Pld	W	D	L	GF	GA	Pts	(Netherlands)	(Spain)	(India)
1.	Netherlands	2	2	0	0	17	3	4	X	5:2	12:1
2.	Spain	2	1	0	1	13	6	2	2:5	X	11:1
3.	India	2	0	0	2	2	23	0	1:12	1:11	X

== Wrestling ==
Key:

- VT - Victory by Fall.
- Pt - Decision by Points.
- Pd - Decision by Points but Judges disagree.

Men's freestyle

Athlete	Event	Round 1 Result	Round 2 Result	Round 3 Result	Round 4 Result	Round 5 Result	Rank
K. D. Jadhav	−52 kg	B. Harris (AUS); W ^{Pt}	B. Jernigan (USA); W ^{Pt}	M. Raeisi (IRN); L ^{VT}	—N/a		6
Nirmal Bose	−57 kg	G. Leeman (USA); L ^{VT}	—N/a				−
S. Suryavanshi	−62 kg	A. Parsons (GBR); L ^{Pd}	A. Muller (SUI); L ^{VT}	—N/a			−
Banta Singh	−67 kg	M. Hassan (EGY); L ^{Pt}	C. Atik (TUR); L ^{VT}	—N/a			−
A. Bhargava	−73 kg	Yaşar Doğu (TUR); L ^{VT}	E. Estrada Ojeda (MEX); W ^{Pd}	Dick Garrard (AUS); L ^{VT}	—N/a		−
K. Roy	−79 kg	M. Vachon (CAN); L ^{VT}	R. Arthur (AUS); L ^{VT}	—N/a			−

== See also ==
- Gold (2018 film), about India's national hockey team at the 1948 Summer Olympics
