= Cycling in India =

- Country: India
- Governing body: Cycling Federation of India
- National team: India

The history of cycling as a sport in India dates back to 1938. The Cycling Federation of India takes care of the sport. Cycling is unknown as a professional sport in India but popular as a common recreational sport and it is a good way to keep fit.

== Background ==
=== Mountain biking ===
Mountain biking is becoming a popular sport. For the last 15 years, MTB Himachal now MTB Himalaya has been organized regularly by HASTPA, an NGO. The race attracts both national and international participants, including world champions such as Cory Wallace and Andreas Seewald, as well as riders from the Indian Army, Indian Air Force, Indo-Tibetan Border Police (ITBP), and numerous individual competitors from cities including Pune, Bengaluru, Delhi, and Chandigarh.

In 2024, the Government of Sikkim (Department of Tourism) launched its own mountain bike race, which offered the largest prize money in South East Asia. The second edition of the event featured 48 professional participants.

MTB Himalaya has reached its 15th edition.

Mountain bike races are also organised by the Kalyan Cyclist group near Rayate, approximately 10 km from Kalyan. These events have been held annually since 2018.

=== Road cycling ===
The Tour of Nilgiris is a major non-competitive touring event in South Asia that covers 800 to 1,000 kilometres in 8 days. The Tour of Nilgiris (TfN), India's first Day Touring Cycle Ride, was born in 2008 with the twin objectives of promoting bicycling as an activity and spreading awareness about the bio-diversity, flora and fauna of the Nilgiris.

India has put forth its foot in randonneuring events. These are conducted under the aegis of Audax Club Parisien and are now done across India with 15 clubs doing brevets every month. Brevets began in India in 2010. 200, 300, 400, 600, 1000 & 1200 kilometers events are conducted regularly as per the global calendar.

The Rotary Club of Madras Midtown conducted a cycle rally called K2K Tour de Rotary, from Kashmir to Kanyakumari, for the cause of Swatch Bharat.

In a similar manner, Indian Cycling League conducts GPS-based Cycling races to keep motivating cyclists of India.

== Medal table ==
Tournament	1st place, gold medalist(s)	2nd place, silver medalist(s)	3rd place, bronze medalist(s)	Total
Asian Games	0	1	2	3
Asian Championships			1	
Asia Cup	4			
Total	0	1	2	3

- Updated till 2023

== Notable cyclists ==
=== Current ===
- Harshveer Sekhon
- Meenakshi Rohilla
- Ronaldo Laitonjam
- Esow Alben
- Deborah Herold
- Alena Reji
- Manjeet Singh
- Dinesh Kumar
- Sahil Kumar

=== Former ===
- Rajesh Chandrasekar
- Amarjeet Singh Nagi
- Amrit Singh
- Keziya Vergise
- Alan Baby
- Deborah Herald
- Amandeep Singh
- Satbir Singh
- Atul Kumar
- Sanu Raj P
- Mahitha Mohan
- Okram Bikram Singh
- Maxwell Trevor
- Jehangoo Amin
- Amar Singh Billing
- Pradip Bose
- Netai Chand Bysack
- Suprovat Chakravarty
- Dalbir Singh Gill
- Chetan Singh Hari
- Adi Havewala
- Bapoo Malcolm Sr.
- Raj Kumar Mehra
- Eruch Mistry
- Rohinton Noble
- Homi Powri
- Piloo Sarkari
- Tarit Kumar Sett
- Suchha Singh
- Amar Singh Sokhi

== National award recipients ==
Year	Recipient	Award	Gender
1975	Amar Singh	Arjuna Award	Male
1978–1979	Minati Mahapatra	Arjuna Award	Female
1983	Armin R. Arthan	Arjuna Award	Female
