= Ramnath Biswas =

Ramnath Biswas রামনাথ বিশ্বাস
- Born: 13 January 1894; Baniachong, Habiganj Assam Province, British India (Now Bangladesh)
- Died: 1 November 1955 (aged 61); Kolkata, West Bengal, India
- Occupations: Soldier, Globe trotter, Writer

Ramnath Biswas (Bengali: রামনাথ বিশ্বাস, romanized: Ramnath Bishshash; 13 January 1894 – 1 November 1955) was an Indian revolutionary, soldier, globetrotter and travelogue writer. He is known for circumnavigating the globe by bicycle.

== Early life ==
Ramnath was born to Birajanath Biswas and Gunamayee Devi in the year 1894 in the Vidyabhusanpara village of Baniachong in the Sylhet District of Assam which now falls under Habiganj District of Bangladesh. In his childhood he attended the Harischandra High School till the eighth grade. He had to quit studies due to the untimely death of his father.

== Career ==
Ramnath started his career as a manager at the Jatiya Bhandar Samiti, a Swadeshi enterprise based in Sylhet. Jatiya Bhandar Samiti had a motor car repairing workshop and Ramnath learnt driving. During his tenure in this organization, he also learnt how to ride a bicycle and became quite expert at it. Then he left the job at Jatiya Bhandar Samiti and took up another job. During this time he secretly joined the Anushilan Samiti. However, his association with the revolutionary group became public and he was expelled from his job. During this time the First World War broke out. Ramnath joined the Bengali Paltan and went to the war in Mesopotamia. In 1924, he took up a job with the British Navy and moved to British Malaya.

== World tours ==
=== 1st tour (1931-33) ===
In 1931, Ramnath embarked on his first world tour on a bicycle. In his possession he had a pair of slippers, two wrappers, a bicycle and a box containing tools for bicycle repair. The bicycle frame had a metal board with the message - "Round the world, Hindoo traveller". On 7 July 1931, Ramnath started his journey from Queen Street in Singapore. The expatriate Indians of Singapore gathered on the occasion to wish him success. He cycled through Malaya, Siam, Indochina, China, Korea, Japan and reached Canada. In Canada, he was arrested and jailed for a month. In 1934, he returned to India. On his return to his native place the village arranged huge felicitation programme at the historic Eralia grounds. At the programme, while sharing his experience of his world tour, Ramnath described Baniachang as the largest village of the world.

=== 2nd tour (1934-36) ===
In 1934, Ramnath embarked on his second world tour. This time he travelled through India, Afghanistan, Persia, Iraq, Syria, Lebanon, Turkey, Bulgaria, Yugoslavia, Hungary, Austria, Czechoslovakia, Germany, the Netherlands, Belgium, France and reached England. He toured Scotland as well. The long arduous journey took toll on his health. In 1936, he returned from London in a ship via Port Said and reached Mumbai. After regaining his health and fitness, he travelled to Santiniketan to meet Rabindranath Tagore.

=== 3rd tour (1938-40) ===
In 1938, he embarked on his third world tour. This time he travelled to Africa. From Mumbai, he travelled to Mombasa in a ship. He started on his bicycle from Mombasa and travelled through Kenya, Uganda, Nyasaland, Rhodesia and reached South Africa. From there he travelled to the United States. He returned home in 1940.

== Later life ==
After the Partition of India, his native place became a part of Pakistan. Ramnath didn't emigrate. However, when he wanted to publish a book on his travelogues, he couldn't find a publisher. He himself founded a publication house by the name of Paryatak Prakashana and began to publish his books. After he few years he left East Pakistan and settled in Kolkata. After his arrival at Kolkata, he began to publish his travelogues in Anandabazar Patrika. He died in 1955.

Biswas's ancestral home has been illegally occupied in Bangladesh.

== Publications ==
Ramnath wrote more than 30 books. The following is an incomplete list.

- Ondhokarer Afrika (Africa of Darkness)
- Ajker America (Today's America)
- Jujitsu Japan (Jujitsu Japan)
- Torun Turki (Young Turkey)
- Duronto Dokkhim Afrika (Vibrant South Africa)
- Nigro Jatir Notun Jibon (New Life of the Negro Nation)
- Proshanto Mohasagore Oshanti (Unrest in the Pacific Ocean)
- Beduiner Deshe (In the Land of the Bedouins)
- Voboghurer Bishvobhramon (A Wanderer's World Tour)
- Vietnam-er Bidrohi Bir (Rebel Hero of Vietnam)
- Maronbijoyi Chin (Death-Conquering China)
- Mao Maor Deshe (In the Land of the Mau Mau)
- Malaysia Bhramon (Travel to Malaysia)
- Lal Chin (Red China)
- Bidrohi Balkan (Rebellious Balkan)
- Shorboswadhin Shyam (Completely Independent Shyam)
- Hollywood-er Atmokotha (Autobiography of Hollywood)
- Tour Round the World Without Money
- Afghanistan-e Bhramon (Travel to Afghanistan)
- Beduiner Deshe o Dichokre Korea Bhramon (In the Land of the Bedouins and Bicycling in Korea)
- Araber Amrittu Lorai (Arab's Fight till Death)
- Torun Turkiye (Young Turkey)
- Chhaya Kaya Bhoy (Fear of Shadows and Forms)
- Prithibir Pothe (On the Path of the Earth)

== See more ==
- Bimal Mukherjee
- Maxwell Trevor
- Rajesh Chandrasekar
- Chandan Biswas
