= Suresh Biswas =

Indian adventurer

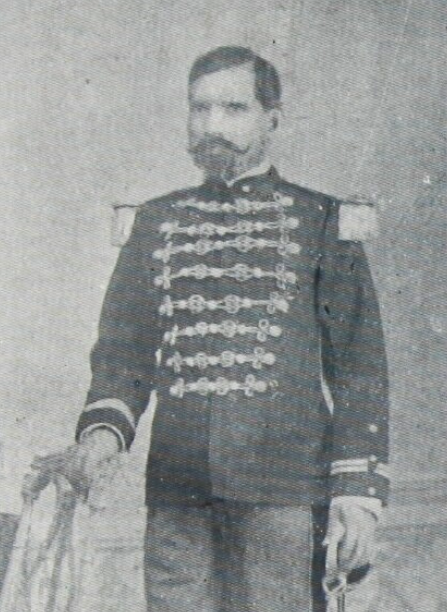
- Lieutenant Suresh Biswas
- Born: 1861; Nathpur, Nadia, Bengal, British India
- Died: 22 September 1905 (aged 44); Rio de Janeiro, Brazil
- Occupations: Ringmaster, doctor, soldier
- Spouse: Maria Augusta Biswas (née Fernandes)

Suresh Biswas (1861 – 22 September 1905) was a 19th-century adventurer from Undivided Bengal. He also gained high acclaim as a ringmaster, showing his prowess with big cats such as lions and tigers. He also came to be known for his military exploits in the Battle of Niterói.

== Life ==
Suresh Chandra Biswas was born in 1861 in a Bengali, Gaudiya vaishnav middle class Mahishya family engaged mostly in agriculture to Girish Chandra Biswas, a government employee in Nathpur, Krishnaganj in Nadia district in Bengal Presidency. Although, the family was not financially well off but was nevertheless, respected among the gentry of the district. His ancestors also took a leading role in the Indigo revolt. Suresh spent a wild childhood, fighting feral cats and dogs, fishing, joining in hunts, and risking life and limb in every conceivable way. He brawled with British soldiers on Calcutta's Maidan, but also became close to his missionary teachers at the London Mission College in Bhowanipore, and left home after turning Christian at the age of 14.

== Career and adventures ==
After working for a short while at Calcutta's Spence's hotel as a kind of tourist guide, Suresh decided to stow away on a ship for Rangoon, and worked as a timber camp care taker in the Taungoo forest for a while. Biswas had travelled to England as a stowaway at the age of seventeen. After he arrived in England he drifted through several occupations, before becoming an animal trainer in a circus in Kent. He travelled with the circus to Hamburg. After that, he migrated first to United States in 1885. From there he moved to South America with the tiger and two lions which he had received from Karl Hagenbeck, an animal expert from Hamburg, Germany. Firstly, to Argentina and then finally, to Brazil, being the first Bengali to do so.

He was invited by "The Carlo Brothers’ Equestrian Company and Zoological Marvel" of Argentina to perform with the tiger and lions. A young Biswas debuted with his Tiger, two lions and an elephant named "Bosco", to great acclaim in Buenos Aires, Argentina, drawing audiences from all ranks of social strata and even aristocrats. His success followed him to Rio de Janeiro, Brazil, where the royal family visited the circus to see his performance. In 1887, he joined the Brazilian army as Corporal and rose swiftly through the ranks. The reason for this change of profession is unclear, but researchers generally agree on the fact that he had fallen in love with a woman by the name of Maria Augusta Fernandes, who insisted on seeing him in a uniform. The monarchy was overthrown in 1889, Suresh became a lieutenant in 1893 and was instrumental in quelling the Brazilian Naval Revolt the following year. His exploits at the Battle of Niterói made him an instant hero.

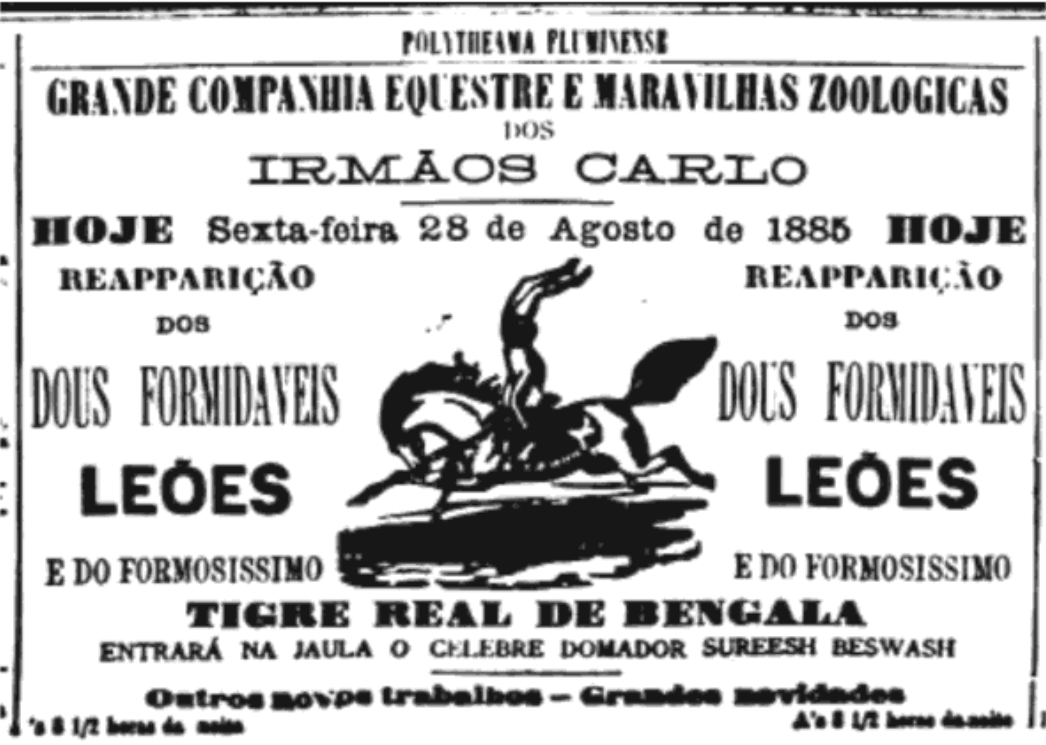
A journal from Rio de Janeiro advertising Suresh Biswas's performance, 28 August 1885

Biswas's career ended in the most abrupt way as he died at only age of 44 on 22 September 1905 in Rio de Janeiro. The exact circumstances of his death remain unknown. He was survived by his wife, Maria Augusta Biswas, and their six children Suresh, Jorge Cleveland, Luiz Merodack, Clarisse, Hermes and Stella. Brazilian government paid the expenses of his funeral; and later the government awarded a permanent montepio (pension) to his widow and temporary pensions were also granted for the children, all of whom were minors at the time.

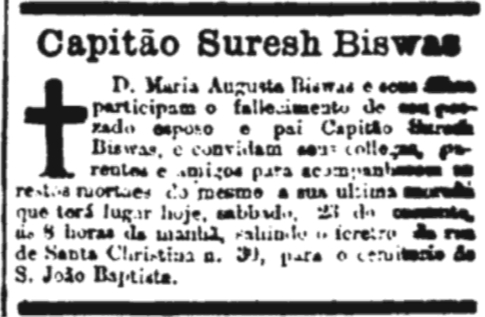
Death Notice published by Captain Suresh Biswas's family in Rio de Janeiro

Though there is little evidence on Biswas's life — only six letters that he wrote to his uncle, Kailash Chandra and some recently excavated circus posters and social records — Suresh Biswas has been the subject of a renewed interest as evidenced by the reprint of his 1899 biography in 2018. It includes an essay by Maria Barrera-Agarwal which provides evidence that validate Biswas's claims. A research-driven biopic-screenplay by Indranil Chakravarty has been published from Australia. A detailed discussion of Biswas' context, and an examination of the biographical sources has been published from New Zealand. Chakravarty presents Biswas's life-narrative "as a non-Western, non-elite 19th century cosmopolitan, thereby constructing a counter-narrative to the dominant discourse of cosmopolitanism as a matter of exclusive Western, elite privilege".

== References in later culture ==
Biswas was mentioned in Satyajit Ray's novel "Chhinnamastar Abhishap" (Trans: The Curse of the Goddess), featuring the fictional detective, Feluda and also in "Du Chakay Duniya" by first Indian globe trotter Bimal Mukherjee. Bengali Comics strip creator Mayukh Chowdhury created a Bengali comics named 'Bangadesher Ranga' on him featuring him in the midst of the jungles in Brazil. Satyajit Ray also, mentions him in one other short story, "Anko Sir, Golapi Babu ar Tipu". Colonel Suresh Biswas's name was also referred in the short story "Biswas Moshai" by Banaful (Balai Chand Mukhopadhyay). Also,‌ he was mentioned in writer Hemendra Kumar Roy's story "Surjo Nogorir Gupotodhon", which belongs to Hemendra Kumar's Bimal-Kumar series.

Suresh Biswas is also mentioned in Subhas Chandra Bose autobiography.
