= List of Indian records in track cycling =

The following are the national records in track cycling in India, maintained by the Cycling Federation of India.

== Men ==
Event	Record	Athlete	Date	Meet	Place	Ref
Flying 200 m time trial	9.671	David Beckham Elkatohchoongo	16 March 2025	Nations Cup	Konya, Turkey	
250 m time trial (standing start)	17.922	Rojit Singh Yanglem	21 April 2022	Nations Cup	Glasgow, United Kingdom	
500 m time trial	33.497	Ronaldo Singh Laitonjam	1 August 2022	Commonwealth Games	London, United Kingdom	
1 km time trial	1:00.863	Ronaldo Singh Laitonjam	19 June 2023	Asian Championships	Nilai, Malaysia	
1 km time trial (sea level)	1:00.863	Ronaldo Singh Laitonjam	19 June 2023	Asian Championships	Nilai, Malaysia	
Team sprint	44.187	Rojit Singh Yanglem; David Beckham Elkatohchoongo; Esow Alben	14 March 2025	Nations Cup	Konya, Turkey	
4000 m individual pursuit	4:26.331	Dinesh Kumar	23 February 2025	Asian Championships	Nilai, Malaysia	
4000 m team pursuit	4:07.091	Vishwajit Singh; Dinesh Kumar; Venkappa Kengalgutti; Anantha Narayan	18 June 2022	Asian Championships	New Delhi, India	

== Women ==
Event	Record	Athlete	Date	Meet	Place	Ref
Flying 200 m time trial	11.139	Deborah Herold	18 February 2018	Asian Championships	Nilai, Malaysia	
250 m time trial (standing start)	19.500	Celestina Chelobroy	25 March 2026	Asian Championships	Tagaytay, Philippines	
Flying 500 m time trial						
500 m time trial	34.981	Deborah Herold	17 February 2018	Asian Championships	Nilai, Malaysia	
500 m time trial (sea level)	34.981	Deborah Herold	17 February 2018	Asian Championships	Nilai, Malaysia	
1 km time trial	1:09.666	Keerthi Rangaswamy	26 February 2025	Asian Championships	Nilai, Malaysia	
Team sprint (500 m)	34.847	Deborah Herold; Alena Reji	16 February 2018	Asian Championships	Nilai, Malaysia	
Team sprint (750 m)	49.525	Celestina Chelobroy; Triyasha Paul; Keerthi Rangaswamy	25 March 2026	Asian Championships	Tagaytay, Philippines	
3000 m individual pursuit	3:42.515	Meenakshi Rohilla	23 February 2024	Asian Championships	New Delhi, India	
4000 m individual pursuit	4:59.660	Swasti Singh	28 March 2026	Asian Championships	Tagaytay, Philippines	
4000 m team pursuit	4:37.645	Swasti Singh; Harshita Jakhar; Pooja Danole; Meenakshi Rohilla	25 March 2026	Asian Championships	Tagaytay, Philippines	
