= Walter de Sousa =

Indian field hockey player (1920–1989)

Personal information
- Full name: Walter Louis Joseph de Sousa
- Born: 16 December 1920 Mbale, Eastern Uganda
- Died: 23 August 1989 (aged 68) Mumbai, Maharashtra, India

Sport
- Sport: Field hockey
Medal record
Men's Field hockey
Representing India
Olympic Games
Gold medal – first place	1948 London	Team

Walter Luis de Sousa (16 December 1920 – 23 August 1989) was an Indian field hockey player.

== Early life ==
Walter was born in Mbale, Uganda, East Africa, on 16 December 1920, where his father worked for the British government. His parents were Thomas Epifanio de Souza from Aldona and Lucy de Souza from Porvorim. He returned to India as a young boy to pursue his education, passing the Senior Cambridge examination from St. Joseph E.H. School in Bangalore.

It was while he was a schoolboy in Bangalore that he started playing hockey; sources describe him as taking to hockey and football "as the duck takes to water." In the early 1940s he played for a club called the Bangalore Blues. He then moved to Bombay and joined The Times of India and played both hockey and soccer for them.

He subsequently joined the Lusitanians, a Goan hockey team that in years to come fielded several Olympians including fellow Olympians Leo Pinto, Maxi Vaz, Reggie Rodrigues and Amir Kumar. He was considered the team's "tower of strength".

== International and club career ==
A member of the Indian Field Hockey Team that took the gold medal at the 1948 Olympic competition, Walter D'Souza's athletic career lasted around two decades. He was blessed with a strong physique and easily attracted notice on both the hockey and football fields.

In 1943 he joined the Lusitanian Hockey Team and helped them take the Provincial Cup, the Lewis Cup, the Willie Fernandes Trophy and second place in the competition for the field hockey Aga Khan Trophy. That same year, he also joined the Young Goans Football club and won his first of three successive Nadkarni Cups with the team. He captained the Lusitanians in 1944 and 1945, winning the Aga Khan Trophy and achieving second place for the Lewis Cup.

In 1952, he began playing soccer for Bombay and in 1954 and 1955 he captained the city's field hockey team. As captain of the India Culture League, he won the Indian Football Association's Shield; it was the first time a team outside of Calcutta had won the honor and brought the trophy to Bombay. He left the Lusitanians in 1956 to play for the Burmah Shell Sports Club for three years and continued to play for various teams on and off through 1968. He represented Bombay in national games for many years and toured with the Indian team in Sri Lanka, East Africa, and throughout India.

== Later years and death ==
After retiring from active sports, D'Souza offered his services as a hockey coach to Bombay University and the Bombay Hockey Association. In 1976 he was the selector of the Indian Hockey Federation when India won its first (and, as of 2006, only) Hockey World Cup. However, he eventually quit the Bombay Hockey Association because he found it difficult to agree with the authorities regarding the management of affairs.

Despite his health and eyesight beginning to fail, which kept him off the grounds, he remained ready to assist, particularly by coaching youngsters in poor schools. During the Aga Khan matches in Bombay, he was known to manifest his humility by serving as an usher.

He died after a painful illness on 23 August 1989. His funeral was held at Haines Road and was attended by many prominent players, including Lawrie Fernandes, Leo Pinto, and John Mascarenhas. In his funeral oration, his teammate Leo Pinto extolled his qualities and described him as "the Rock of Gibraltar" for his ability on the field.

== Representing India ==
1947 – East Africa Tour

1948 – London Olympics

1949 – Jashan Celebration in Afghanistan

== Awards and honors ==
The Bakshi Bahaddar Jiva Kerkar State Award For Excellence In Sports By The Government Of Goa.

The city of Mumbai honored him by founding the Walter de Sousa Garden near the Metro Cinema in 1993.
