= Pooja Danole =

Indian cyclist (born 2004)

Pooja Danole (born 15 April 2004) is an Indian cyclist from Maharashtra. She is an Indian track cycling national record holder in the Team pursuit.

She represented India at the 2026 Asian Games at Nagoya, Aichi Prefecture, Japan.

== Early life ==
Danole is from Kolhapur, Maharashtra. Her father and brother had a background in wrestling. She started with wrestling and triathlon but after some district level and state level competitions, she was selected in cycling for the Sports hostel at Balewadi, Pune.

== Career ==
In March 2021, she won two gold medals at the 25th National Road Cycling Championship at Mumbai.

In May 2026, she won a bronze medal for India, along with Swasti Singh, in the 20km madison event at the Grand Prix Tashkent at Uzbekistan. In February 2025, she won a gold and two silver medals at the cycling event of the 38th National Games at Uttarakhand. she won a won a gold medal in the individual time trial event and silver medals in the 60 km race and the 3 km individual skill event with a time of 4 minutes 04.494 seconds.

In the 2026 Asian Games, she was part of the Indian women's team, along with Meenakshi Rohilla, Harshita Jakhar and Swasti Singh, and finished 5th and last in the women's team pursuit qualifying round and were eliminated.
