= Sohrab Bhoot =

Indian cycling executive

Sohrab H. Bhoot (or Sorabji Bhoot or Sorab Bhoot; 1891 – 9 January 1984) was an Indian Olympian administrator and sports administrator in the early and middle 20th century.

== Biography ==
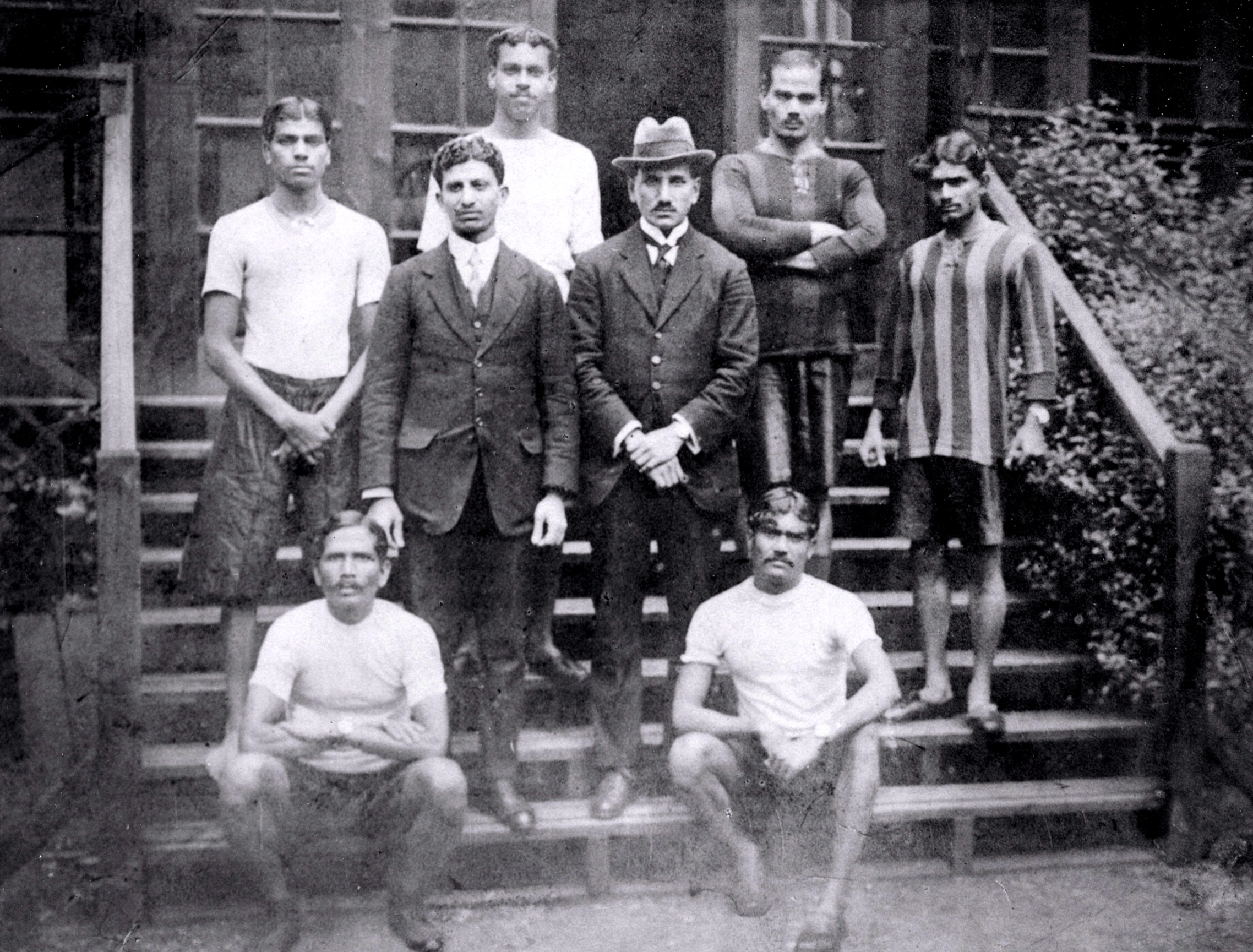
Indian Olympic delegation 1920: (top, l-to-r:) Shindes, Bannerjee, Navale, Chaugule; (middle:) Bhoot, Fyzee; (seated:) Datar, Kaikadi

Bhoot's major accomplishments were to serve as:

- Manager of India's first Olympic team at the 1920 Olympics in Antwerp. He was also a selector and administrator for the Indian team at four other Olympics.
- President of the National Cycling Federation of India. Bhoot and Jankidas co-founded this national cycling federation in 1946. Under Bhoot's management, the Indian cycling team made its Olympic debut at the 1948 Olympics in London. Bhoot also served as President of the Asian Cycling Federation. Overall, he took the Indian cycling team to several international cycling events and world cycling championships from the late 1940s until the early 1960s.
- A key organiser of the 1951 Asian games.
- Secretary of the Technical Committee for the Athletics Federation of India.
- Member of the managing committee, as well as treasurer, of the Indian Olympic Association.
- Editor of the Sports Herald.

Bhoot died on 9 January 1984 at the age of 92. His obituary and news of his passing was carried in the Mid-Day (“Disappearing Breed,” Jan 11); the Indian Express ("Bhoot dead," Jan 10); and Jam-e-Jamshed, titled "The Grand Old Man of Sports", which noted that Bhoot was 'one of the founders of the Olympic Movement in India, he helped put Indian sportsmen on the world field and was responsible for promoting many sports noticeably athletics and cycling.' It mentioned his many accomplishments, for example that 'He was with the late Melwyn D'Mello (Anthony de Mello), a star organiser of the first Asian Games at Delhi.' And it highlighted his strong personal traits: 'being of strong character, he never tolerated faulty organisation,' and always 'stood for the just cause of sportsmen.'

== See also ==
- Cycling Federation of India
- Indian Olympic Association
- India at the 1920 Olympics

== Pictures ==
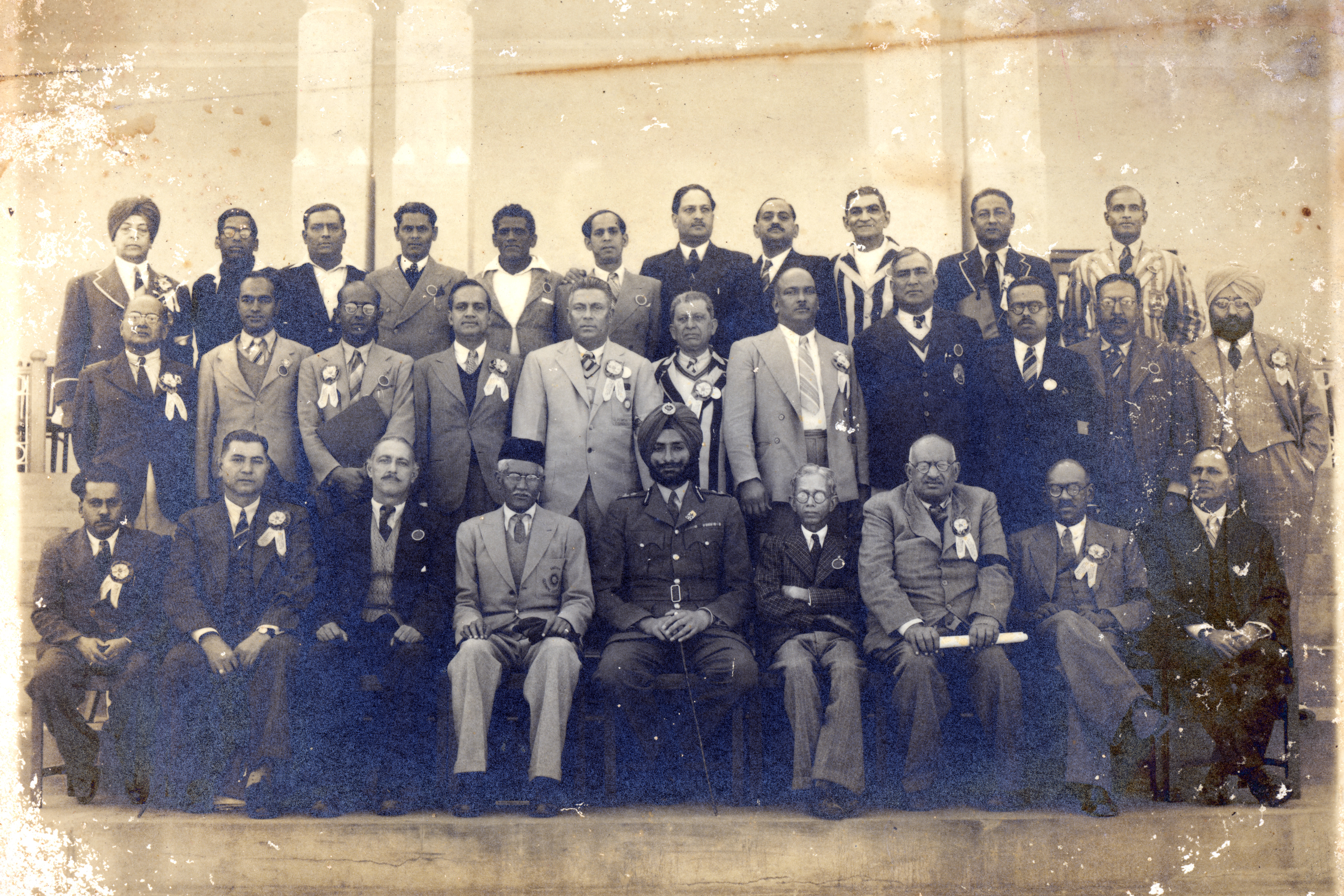
Indian Olympic Association Cte, 1942: Bhoot in striped blazer behind Maharaja of Patiala (seated in center)

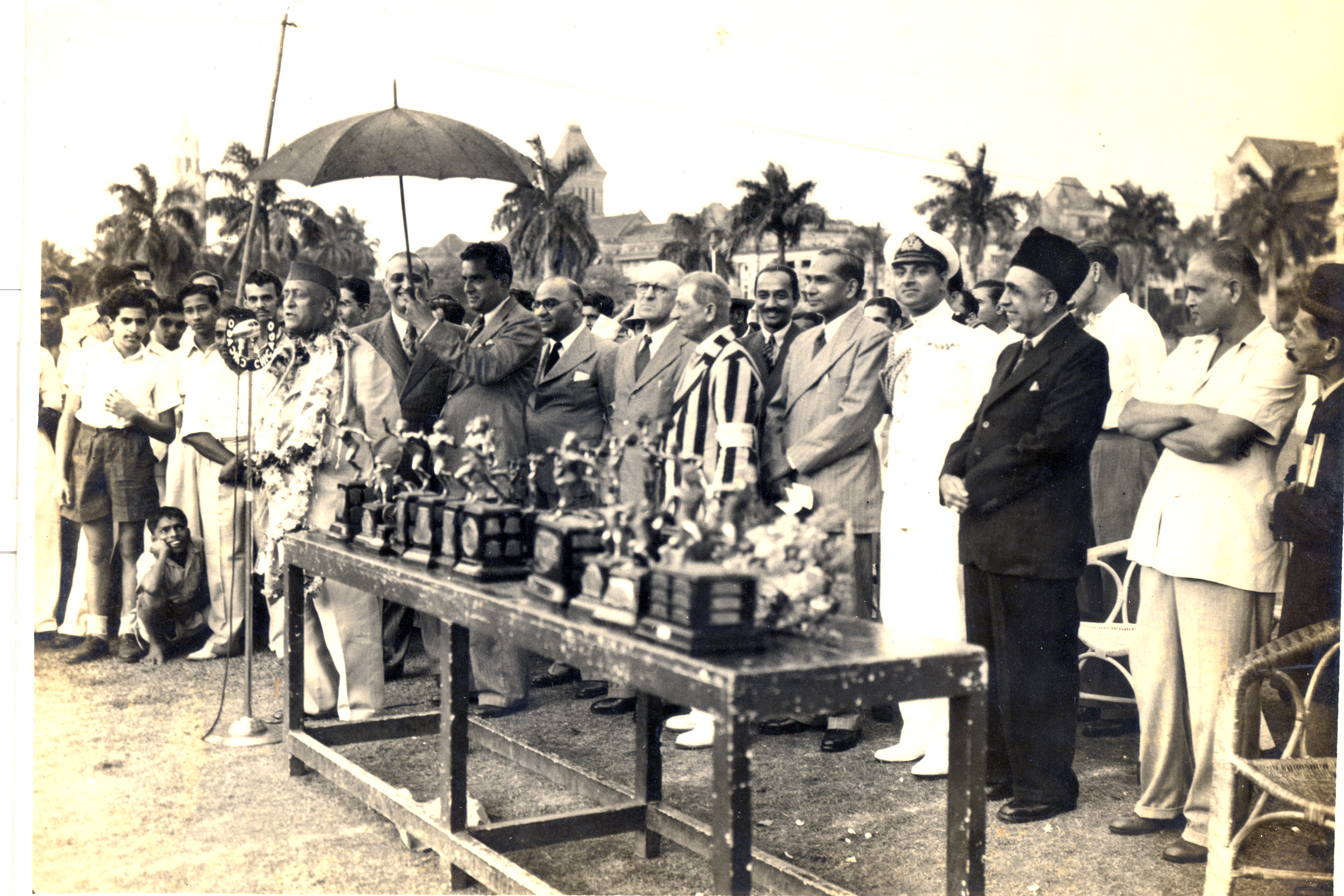
Indian National Games 1950: left to right: Governor of Bombay Raja Maharaja Singh under umbrella, x, x(holding umbrella), Nalini Ranjan Sarker, x, Sohrab Bhoot (in striped blazer), x, G.D. Sondhi, naval captain

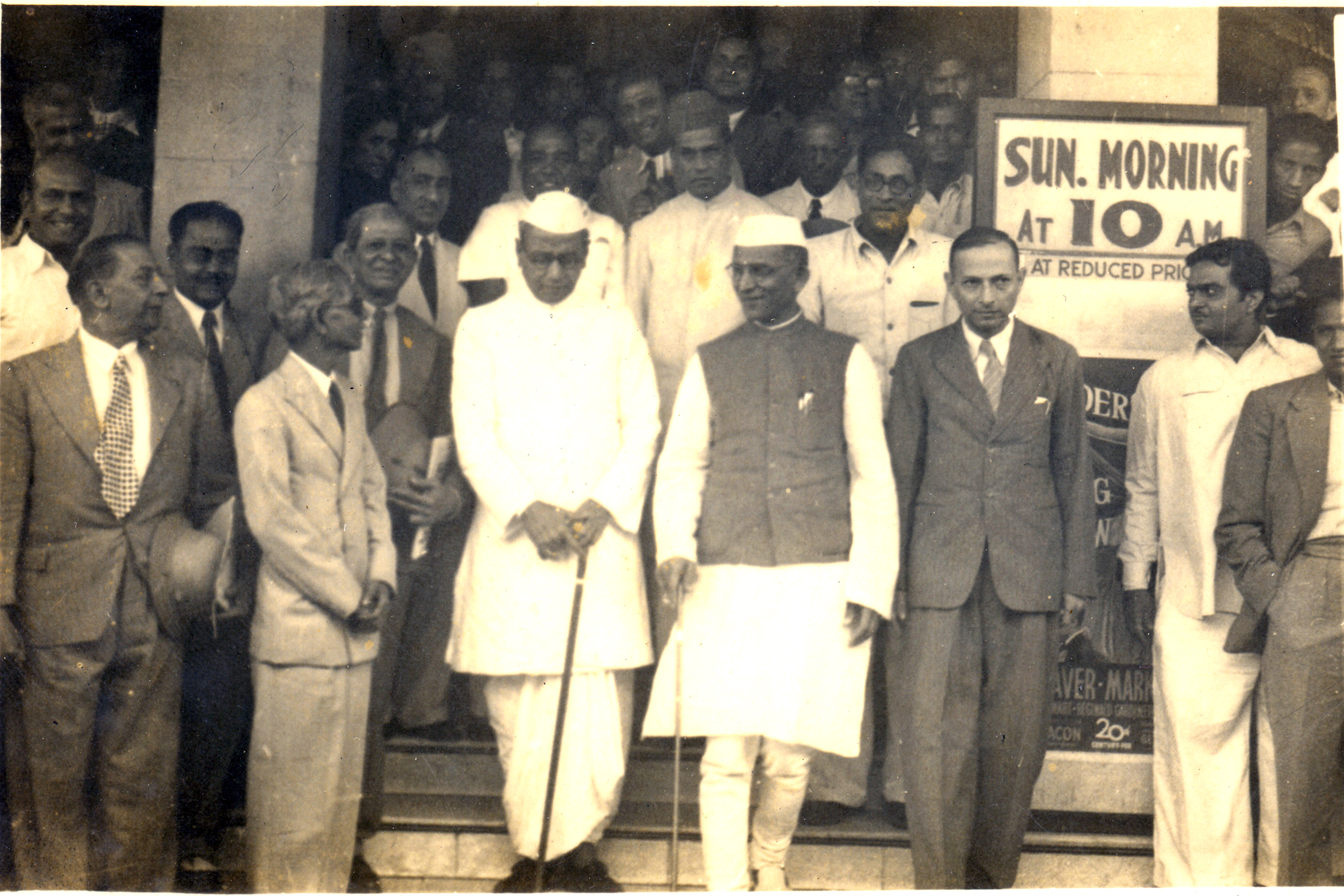
Indian National Games 1950: Moinul Haq (with glasses, fourth from left); Sohrab Bhoot (hat in hand, fifth from left); Bombay Chief Minister B G Kher (beside Bhoot, with white cap and cane)(center-left) ; Bombay Home Minister Morarji Desai (with white cap)(center-right)

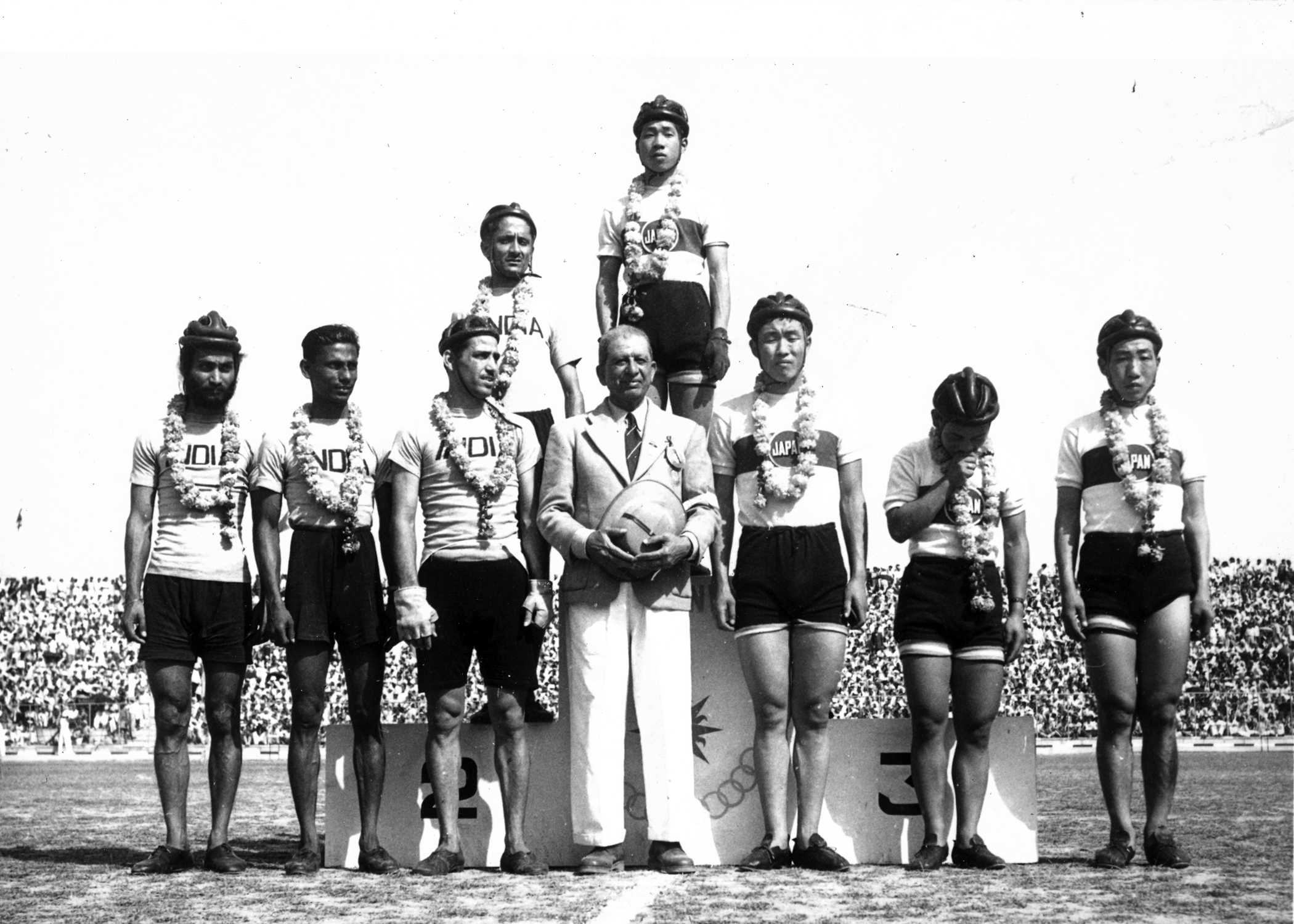
1951 Asian Games: Cyclists Raj Kumar Mehra (standing on podium); Gurdev Singh, Dhangar (Lhanguard), Madan Mohan (standing left to right); and manager Bhoot (standing, fourth from left in blazer)

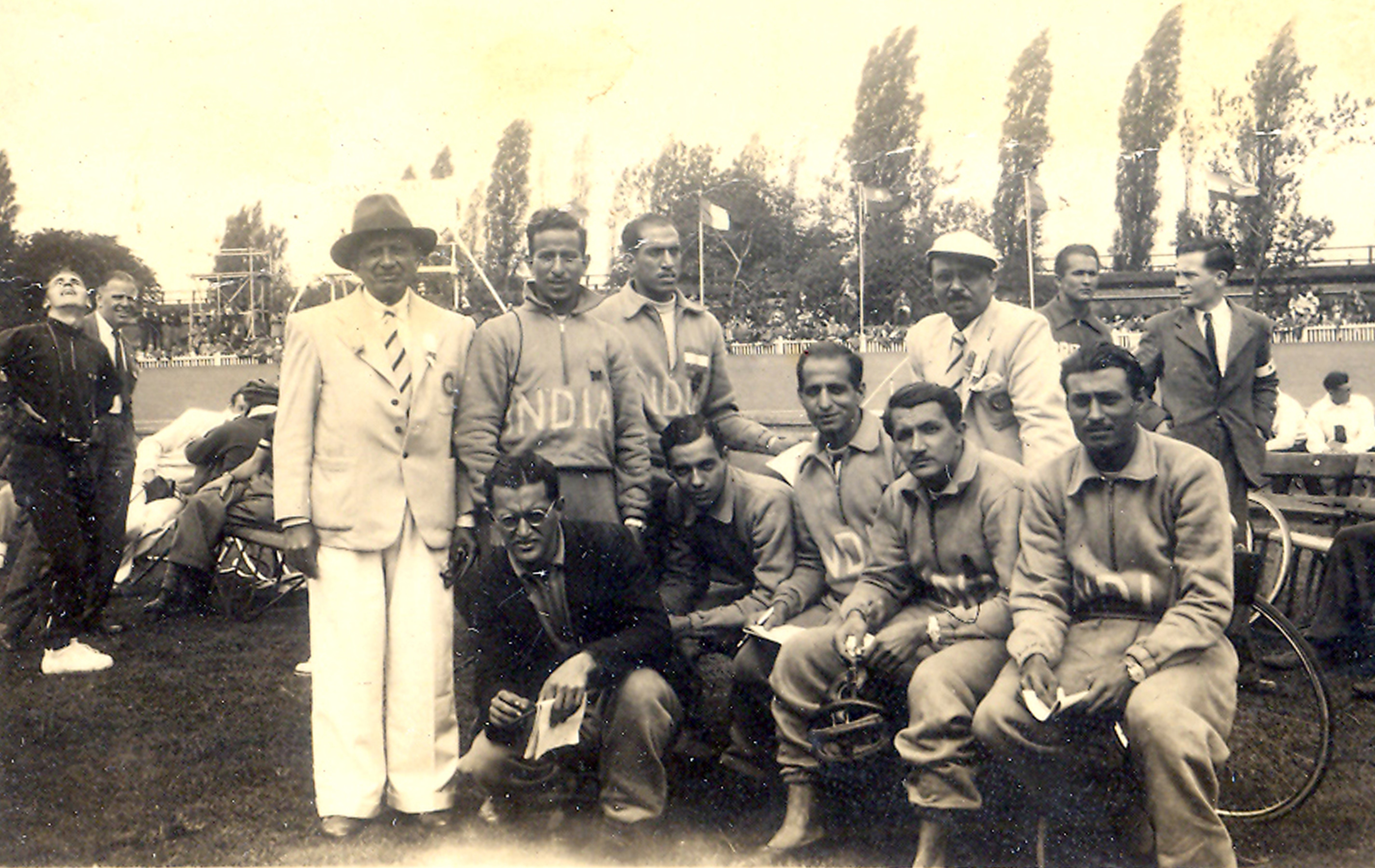
Bhoot with Indian cyclists Havewala, Malcolm, Mehra, and official Nariman Saugar, at the 1948 Olympics
