= Ahmed bin Hamad Al-Thani =

Qatari athlete

Sheikh Ahmed bin Hamad bin Ali Al-Thani الشيخ احمد بن حمد بن علي آل ثاني

Vice President of Qatar Police Sports Federation
- In office 17 January 2022 – now

Personal details
- Born: Sheikh Ahmed bin Hamad bin Ali Al-Thani; 8 July 1978 (age 47) Doha, Qatar
- Height: 1.71 m (5 ft 7 in)
- Occupation: Sport executive

Sheikh Ahmed bin Hamad bin Ali Al-Thani (Arabic: الشيخ احمد بن حمد بن علي آل ثاني; born 8 July 1978) is a Qatari lieutenant colonel, Vice President of Qatar Police Sports Federation, Honorary President of Al Ahli SC,athlete and businessman. He was a member of the Qatar Football Association (2018–2022).

== Education and career ==
Al-Thani married with five children and he was studied at Jassim Bin Hamad High School and graduated in 1997. He obtained a bachelor's degree in economics from Qatar University in 2002. He also holds a master's degree in Business Administration from the Arab Academy for Science, Technology and Maritime Transport - Egypt in 2010.He was elected by acclamation as the president of Al Ahli SC, and now he is Vice President of Qatar Police Sports Federation & Honorary President of Al Ahli SC.

He was the head of the football department of Al Ahli SC between 2004 and 2008, then he became the president of Al Ahli SC between 2008 and 2020, and after 2020 he became the honorary president of the club. He was also the vice president of the Qatar Cycling Federation. He was also the chairman of the Qatar Football Clubs Council between (2018–2022)

He is now the vice president of the Qatar Police Sports Federation, the chairman of the board of directors of A-Z Company Group, the vice president of Vistas Global Group, a member of the Federations Committee in the Asian Football Confederation, and a member of the Football Organizing Committee for the Gulf Cooperation Council countries.

== See also ==
- Al Ahli SC (Doha)
- Qatar Stars League
