= Harshveer Sekhon =

Indian track cyclist

Personal information
- Born: Harshveer Sekhon; 17 January 1998 (age 28) Ludhiana, Punjab, India
- Height: 180 cm (5 ft 11 in)
- Weight: 55 kg (121 lb)

Cycling career
- Sport: Cycling
- Discipline: Track
- Role: Rider
Medal record
Representing India
Men's track cycling
Asia Cup
Silver medal – second place	2019 New Delhi	4km team pursuit
Silver medal – second place	2023 Suphan Buri	Points race
Silver medal – second place	2023 Suphan Buri	Omnium
Men's roller skating
Asian Championships
Silver medal – second place	2017 Haining	Elimination track race

Harshveer Sekhon (born 17 January 1998) is an Indian track cyclist and former roller skater. He's a triple silver medalist at the Asia Cup. As a roller skater, he won the silver medal at the Asian Championships.

== Early life ==
Sekhon was born on 17 January 1998 to mother Baldeep and father Baljeet Sekhon. His younger sister, Jasmeek Sekhon is also a cyclist. He completed his schooling from DAV Public School. Sekhon then pursued a bachelor's in computer science engineering and a master's in business administration from Guru Nanak Dev College, Ludhiana.

He started skating when he was six years old. He trained under JS Dhaliwal at the Leisure Valley Rink in Ludhiana and went on to win several state and national medals.

== Career ==
Sekhon started his sports career as a roller skater. He won the silver in the elimination track race at the Asian Championships and even represented India at the 20,000m event at the 2018 Asian Games. He qualified for the World Championships but withdrew his name due to lack of financial support from the government. This led to him quitting the sport and focusing on studies.

In 2018, Sekhon was introduced to cycling as a sport by a family friend. During the race, he ended up winning gold which gave him the confidence to pursue cycling professionally. In 2019, he won the silver medal in the 4 km team pursuit at the Asia Cup, losing the gold by only a meagre 0.33 seconds.

Sekhon competed at the 2022 Asian Games and the 2022 Commonwealth Games. He won two silver medals at the 2023 Asia Cup in the omnium and elimination race events. He won the bronze in the elimination race at the 2024 Grand Prix Presov. Sekhon next competed in the omnium and elimination races at the World Championships.

== See also ==
- Cycling in India
