= List of Pakistani records in track cycling =

The following are the national records in track cycling in Pakistan, maintained by its national cycling federation, Pakistan Cycling Federation.

== Men ==
| Event | Record | Athlete | Date | Meet | Place | Ref |
|---|---|---|---|---|---|---|
| Flying 200 m time trial | | | | | | |
| 250 m time trial (standing start) | 20.495 | Syed Shah | 20 June 2022 | Asian Championships | New Delhi, India | |
| Flying 500 m time trial | | | | | | |
| 500 m time trial | 36.269 | Syed Shah | 20 June 2022 | Asian Championships | New Delhi, India | |
| Flying 1 km time trial | | | | | | |
| 1 km time trial | 1:11.641 | Syed Shah | 20 June 2022 | Asian Championships | New Delhi, India | |
| Team sprint | 53.804 | Mohsin Khan; Syed Shah; Zahoor Ahmed | 18 June 2022 | Asian Championships | New Delhi, India | |
| 4000 m individual pursuit | 5:10.772 | Muhammad Sharif | 19 June 2022 | Asian Championships | New Delhi, India | |
| 4000 m team pursuit | | | | | | |
| Hour record | | | | | | |

== Women ==
| Event | Record | Athlete | Date | Meet | Place | Ref |
|---|---|---|---|---|---|---|
| Flying 200 m time trial | | | | | | |
| Flying 500 m time trial | | | | | | |
| 500 m time trial | | | | | | |
| Flying 1 km time trial | | | | | | |
| 1 km time trial | | | | | | |
| Team sprint | | | | | | |
| 3000 m individual pursuit | | | | | | |
| 3000 m team pursuit | | | | | | |
| Hour record | | | | | | |
