= Chandan Biswas =

Indian cyclist

Chandan Biswas চন্দন বিশ্বাস
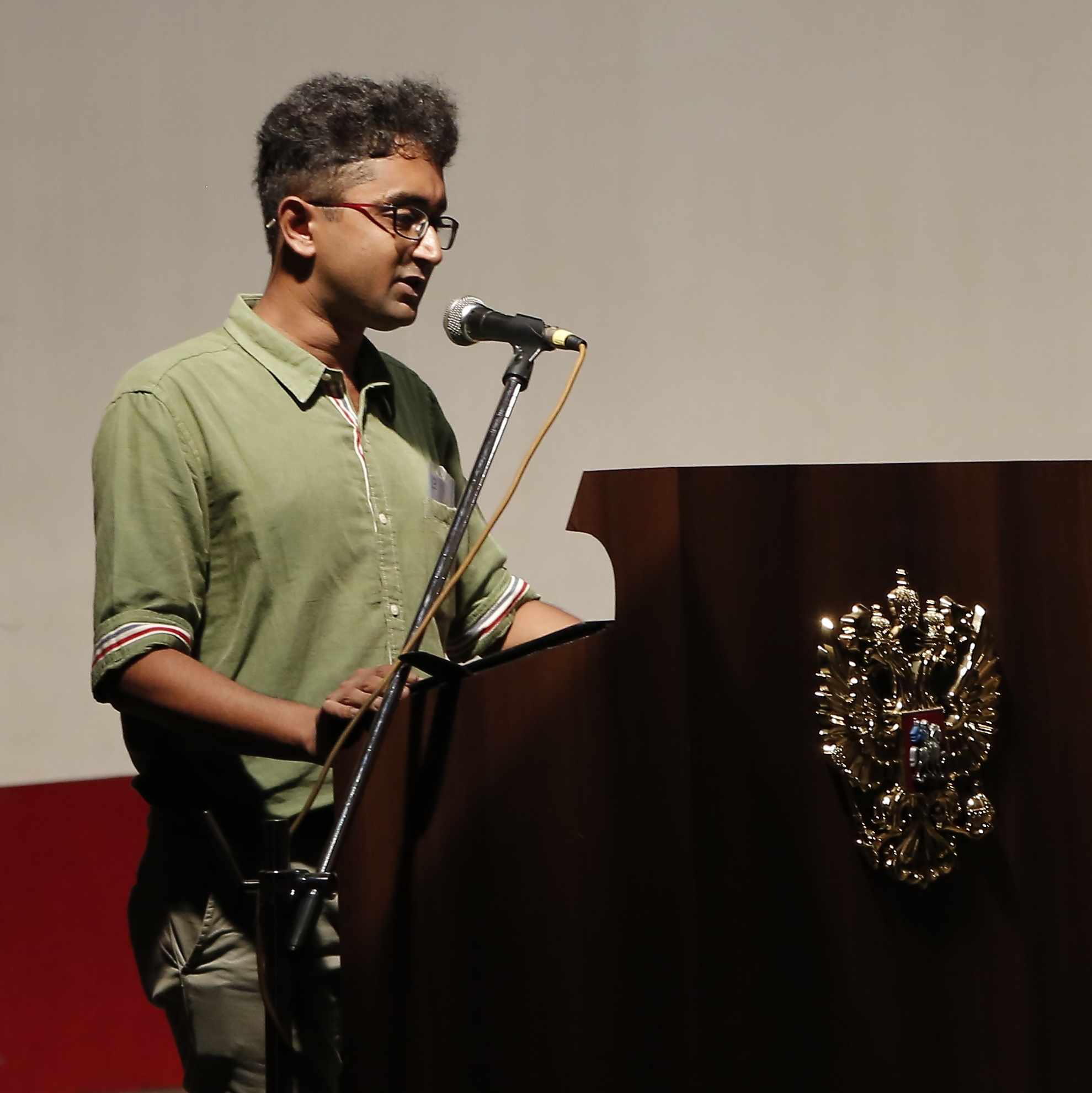
- Born: Chandan Biswas; 5 November 1985 (age 40); Patna, Bihar, India
- Occupations: Explorer; Cyclist
- Website: chandanbiswas.com

Chandan Biswas (born 5 November 1985) is a Bengali Adventure sports personnel and Travel Writer. He became the first to complete the Solo Trans-Himalaya Cycling Expedition. He directed a documentary film Charaiveti based on his own adventurous journey.

== Expeditions ==
Biswas started adventure sports since 2010. He involves with mountaineering, rock climbing and mountain cycling also.

Biswas was the first to successfully complete the Solo Trans-Himalaya Cycling Expedition. It took him 153 days extend over February 2017 to July 2017. In this journey Biswas cycled 6,249 km spanning the countries of Bangladesh, Bhutan, Nepal and India.

He walked along Narmada River trail and valley in 2018 covering 1,047 km in 47 days spanning 4 states of India. Also in 2016 he led an Intra-Country Cycling and Running team from Kolkata to Dhaka to pay tribute to the martyrs of the Language Movement ahead of the International Mother Language Day.

== Adventure timeline ==
- 2018 - Narmada River Trail on foot | 1,047 km | 47 Days | Solo
- 2017 - Trans-Himalaya & SAARC Countries Cycling Expedition | 6,249 km | 153 Days | Solo
- 2016 - Kolkata to Dhaka Inter-Country Cycling Program | Akshar Yatra

== Life ==
He is a cinematographer by profession. He regularly writes for newspaper publications and magazines.

== See more ==
- Ramnath Biswas
- Bimal Mukherjee
- Maxwell Trevor
