= 2010 in Indian sports =

The 2010 in Indian sports was held across the Indian cities all through the season.

== Events ==
- 13 January – Sri Lanka defeated India by 4 wickets in the final of the tri-series also involving Bangladesh.
- 17 January – India's Sachin Tendulkar became the first batsman to complete 13,000 runs in Test cricket, during the opening match against Bangladesh.
- 19 January – Controversy erupted after the Indian Premier League auction, when none of the franchises put forward a bid for any the eleven Pakistan players who were part of the auction list. The Pakistan Cricket Board later revoked the 'no objection certificate' given to its players to participate in IPL.
- 19 February – India drew the two test match series against South Africa 1–1, by winning the second test match.
- 24 February – India's Sachin Tendulkar became the first cricketer in the history of One Day International cricket to score a double century. He achieved this feet in the second ODI against South Africa. His score of 200* was also the highest ever individual score in an ODI innings beating the previous highest (194) jointly held by Zimbabwe's Charles Coventry and Pakistan's Saeed Anwar. His innings also included a record 25 fours, the highest ever hit in a single ODI innings.
- 17 April – Twin bombs injure eight people outside M. Chinnaswamy Stadium in Bangalore ahead of an IPL-3 league game between the Royal Challengers Bangalore and the Mumbai Indians. A third device is located outside.
- 25 April – Chennai Super Kings won the third season of the Indian Premier League.
- 21 May – A court restores the Indian Hockey Federation, two years after it was dissolved by the country's Olympic chiefs over bribery allegations and poor on-field results.

== Deaths ==
- 10 August – Leo Pinto, 96, field hockey player, Olympic gold medalist (1948). (b. 1914)
- 20 October – Parthasarathy Sharma, 62, Test cricketer (1974–1977)
