= Jankidas =

Indian actor

- Born: Jankidas Mehra; June 14, 1916; Lahore, British India
- Died: 18 June 2003 (aged 87); Mumbai, Maharashtra, India
- Years active: 1930s–1998
- Children: Shanoo Mehra

Jankidas Mehra (14 June 1916 – 18 June 2003) was an Indian actor of Hindi cinema, cyclist, production designer, and writer. He made over 1000 film appearances between the 1930s and 1997.

== Biography ==
=== Sports ===
Although various press articles in India mention Jankidas as being a member of the International Olympic Committee at the 1936 Olympic Games and being the only Indian to have broken the world record in cycling between 1934 and 1942, the India at the 1936 Summer Olympics page does not mention him. Nor do any IOC or Cycling records mention his name. He participated in the 1938 British Empire Games (now called Commonwealth Games).

In the 1940s, along with Sohrab Bhoot, he founded the Cycling Federation of India.

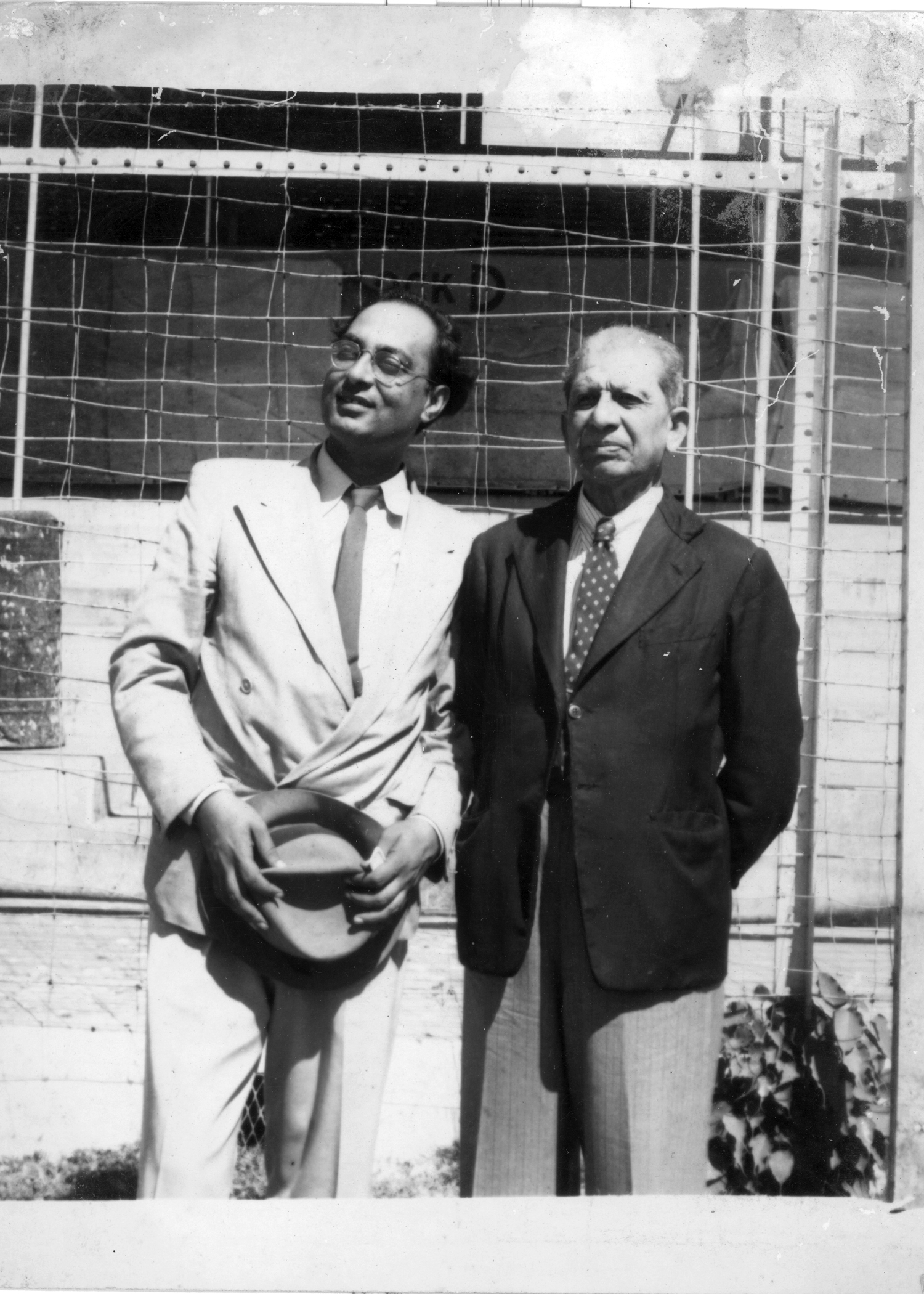
Cycling Federation of India founders J. Das (left) and Sohrab Bhoot (right)

=== Films ===
Jankidas debuted in films playing a major role in Khazanchi (1941), produced in Lahore. He was not seen again until 1946, when he would appear in Dr. Kotnis Ki Amar Kahani. From then on he would continue to play roles with increasing vigour over the years.

As a production designer, Jankidas was responsible for the founding of many famous Indian actor's careers. He was responsible for Madhubala's role in Sohrab Modi's Daulat in 1947, and introduced Meena Kumari in Nanabhai Bhatt's Hamara Ghar, and Khushbu in Sunil Dutt's Dard Ka Rishta. He also introduced actress Mala Sinha in Hamlet, produced and directed by Kishore Sahu.

In 1985, he wrote the script for the film Yaadon Ki Kasam.

Jankidas was the recipient of numerous national and international awards. In May 1996, he was honored with the Lifetime Achievement Award given by the Indian Motion Pictures Producers' Association.

Jankidas was also an author and wrote numerous books on Bollywood and the acting profession. He published My Misadventures in Filmland and Acting for Beginners.

== Selected filmography ==
Year	Film	Character/Role
1941	Khazanchi	News reporter
1946	Dr. Kotnis Ki Amar Kahani	Dr. Mukherjee
1948	Rambaan	
1949	Aiye	
1949	Daulat	Mr. Sinha
1950	Babul	Ashok's father
1950	Hanste Ansoo	Kumar's father
1953	Baaz	Ramzan Ali Saudagar
1958	Kala Pani	Daulat Chand
1960	Dil Bhi Tera Hum Bhi Tere	Teacher
1965	Arzoo	Ramesh's servant
1965	Adhi Raat Ke Baad	
1966	Daadi Maa	Pandit Gyandutt
1967	Patthar Ke Sanam	Mr. Poojari
1967	Hare Kanch Ki Chooriyan	Shopkeeper
1967	Parivar	Paan seller
1968	Sadhu Aur Shaitaan	Seth Jankidas
1969	Sajan (1969 film)	Tarakilal, Stage Show Organizer
1970	Pushpanjali	Tourist guide
1970	Khilona (1970 film)	Advocate Jankidas
1971	Chingari	Pandit
1971	Naya Zamana	Sitaram
1972	Seeta Aur Geeta	Secretary
1972	Yeh Gulistan Hamara	Haku
1974	Patthar Aur Payal	Jankidas, Casino Manager
1975	Khel Khel Mein	Seth Ghanshyam Das, Jewellery Store Owner
1976	Sankoch	Vidyavathi Father
1977	Saheb Bahadur	Astrolger
1977	Kasam Khoon Ki	Seth Dwarkadas
1978	Tumhari Kasam	Tikam Seth
1978	Bhola Bhala	
1978	Des Pardes	Daiyal
1978	Azaad (1978 film)	Diwanji
1979	Sargam	Landlord
1979	Khandaan	Kedarnath
1979	Bhala Manus	Jankidas
1979	Prem Bandhan	Rodrigues
1980	Khanjar	
1980	The Burning Train	Ticket Collector in Express Train
1980	Kali Ghata	
1981	Hotel	D'Souza
1982	Taaqat	
1983	Humse Na Jeeta Koi	Lala
1983	Paanchwin Manzil	Gyanchand
1983	Nishaan	Pandit
1983	Naukar Biwi Ka	Director Personnel Assistant
1984	Sharaabi	Rustomjee Bandookwala
1984	Phulwari	Antique Shop Owner
1984	Laila	Pandit
1985	Karishma Kudrat Kaa	Seth Jankidas, Jeweller
1985	Mera Damad	Shalu's Bapu
1986	Sasti Dulhan Mahenga Dulha	Pandit
1987	Goraa	Seth Tarachand
1987	Insaniyat Ke Dushman	Manager
1987	Hukumat	Ticket Collector at Railway station
1987	Sitapur Ki Geeta	Bread Man
1987	Mera Yaar Mera Dushman	Club Manager
1987	Sadak Chhap	Seth Jankidas
1988	Shoorveer	House Servant
1988	Kanwarlal	Trivedi
1988	Sherni	Kedarnath
1988	Maalamaal	Antique Shop Owner
1988	Bees Saal Baad	Estate Agent/Broker Jankidas
1991	Farishtay	Foreign Terrorist (Cameo/Guest) Role
1991	Iraada	Janki
1991	Dushman Devta	Pandit
1993	Dhanwaan	Pensioner club Member
1998	Ghar Bazar	Gupta

== Death ==
Jankidas had a heart ailment for a substantial period of time, but was discharged from the local hospital two days before his death. He died of cardiac failure at his Juhu residence on Wednesday 18 June 2003. He was 93.

== External links and sources ==
- Jankidas at IMDb
