= Lawrie Fernandes =

Indian field hockey player (1929–1995)

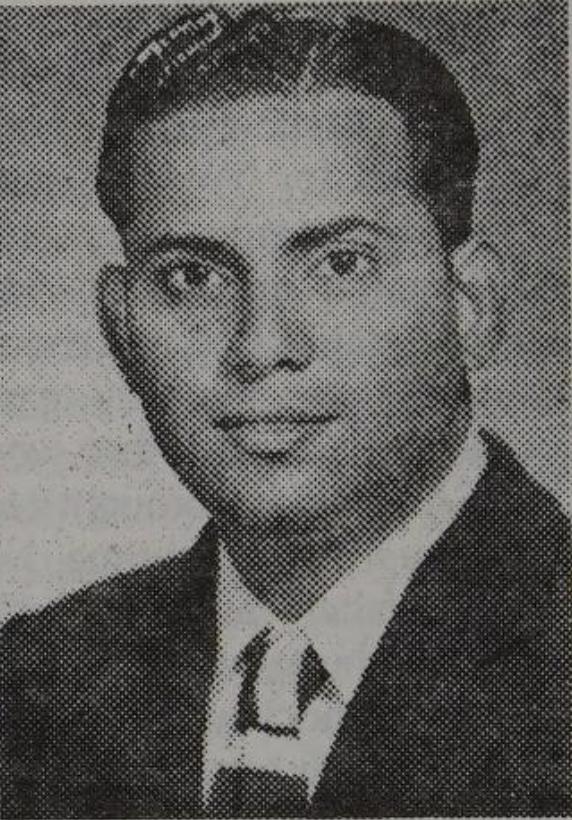

Personal information
- Born: 1929
- Died: 22 January 1995 (aged 65–66)

Sport
- Sport: Field hockey
- Position: Left winger
Senior career
Years	Team	Caps	Goals
–	Lusitanian Sports Club	-	-
–	Tata Sports Club	-	-
National team
Years	Team	Caps	Goals
1947–1951	India		-
Medal record
Men's Field hockey
Representing India
Olympic Games
Gold medal – first place	1948 London	Team

Lawrence "Lawrie" Fernandes (1929 – 22 January 1995) was an Indian field hockey player who won a gold medal with the India men’s national field hockey team at the 1948 Summer Olympics in London.

A Goan player affiliated with Bombay in domestic hockey, Fernandes was one of five Goans in India’s 1948 Olympic squad, alongside Leo Pinto, Walter D’Souza, Maxie Vaz, and Reginald Rodrigues. He also represented Tata Sports Club (later known as Tata Oil Mills Company, or TOMCO) in domestic competitions.

== Early life ==
Fernandes began his hockey career playing for his school, St. Sebastian Goan High School in Dabul. He subsequently played for the Lusitanian Sports Club.

== Career ==
=== Club and state ===
Fernandes joined the Tata Sports Club (TOMCO), where he became a star player. With Tata's, he won the Beighton Cup four times in a row and the Aga Khan Trophy three times in succession. He also represented Bombay in the national championships for eight years.

=== International ===
Fernandes made his international debut in 1947 with the Indian Hockey Federation team during a tour of South India and Ceylon. In 1948, he was part of the Indian team that won the Olympic gold medal in London, marking the first gold for the newly independent nation. In 1951, he played in a match against Japan.

=== Playing style ===
Fernandes played as a "speedy outside left". The distinguished sports critic A. F. S. Talyarkhan described him as a player of "absolute class" who possessed "superb stick control". Talyarkhan noted Fernandes's ability to run down the field at top speed and maneuver around the ball to avoid the "tame reverse-flick," often delivering hard, penetrating drives across the opponent's goalmouth. His teammate, goalkeeper Leo Pinto, considered Fernandes a "charm"; Pinto recalled that whenever Fernandes helped him tie his pads before a game, the team usually did not concede any goals.

== Personal life ==
Fernandes was known for his jovial nature. He was married and had two daughters, Lorraine and Lisa, both of whom inherited his sportsmanship. His daughter, Lorraine Fernandes, represented India in field hockey at the 1980 Summer Olympics in Moscow. She also received the Arjuna Award two years prior to her Olympic appearance and won a silver medal in the 100 metres at the nationals. His other daughter, Lisa, also played competitive hockey.

== Death ==
Fernandes died suddenly on 22 January 1995 at the age of 66. On the day prior to his death, he had received his first pension cheque under a Union Ministry of Sports and Youth Affairs scheme designed to reward international medal winners.
