= Cycling Federation of the Islamic Republic of Iran =

National governing body of cycle racing in Iran

- CFI logo
- Abbreviation: CFI
- Formation: 1947
- Location: Tehran, Iran
- Affiliations: UCI, ACC, NOCIRI
- Website: www.cfi.ir

The Cycling Federation of the Islamic Republic of Iran is the national governing body of cycle racing in Iran. It is a member of the UCI and the Asian Cycling Confederation. The CFI promotes and organizes races in Iran and is responsible for sending teams to international events in other countries.

== See also ==
- Sport in Iran
