= Singapore Cycling Federation =

Sports governing body in Singapore

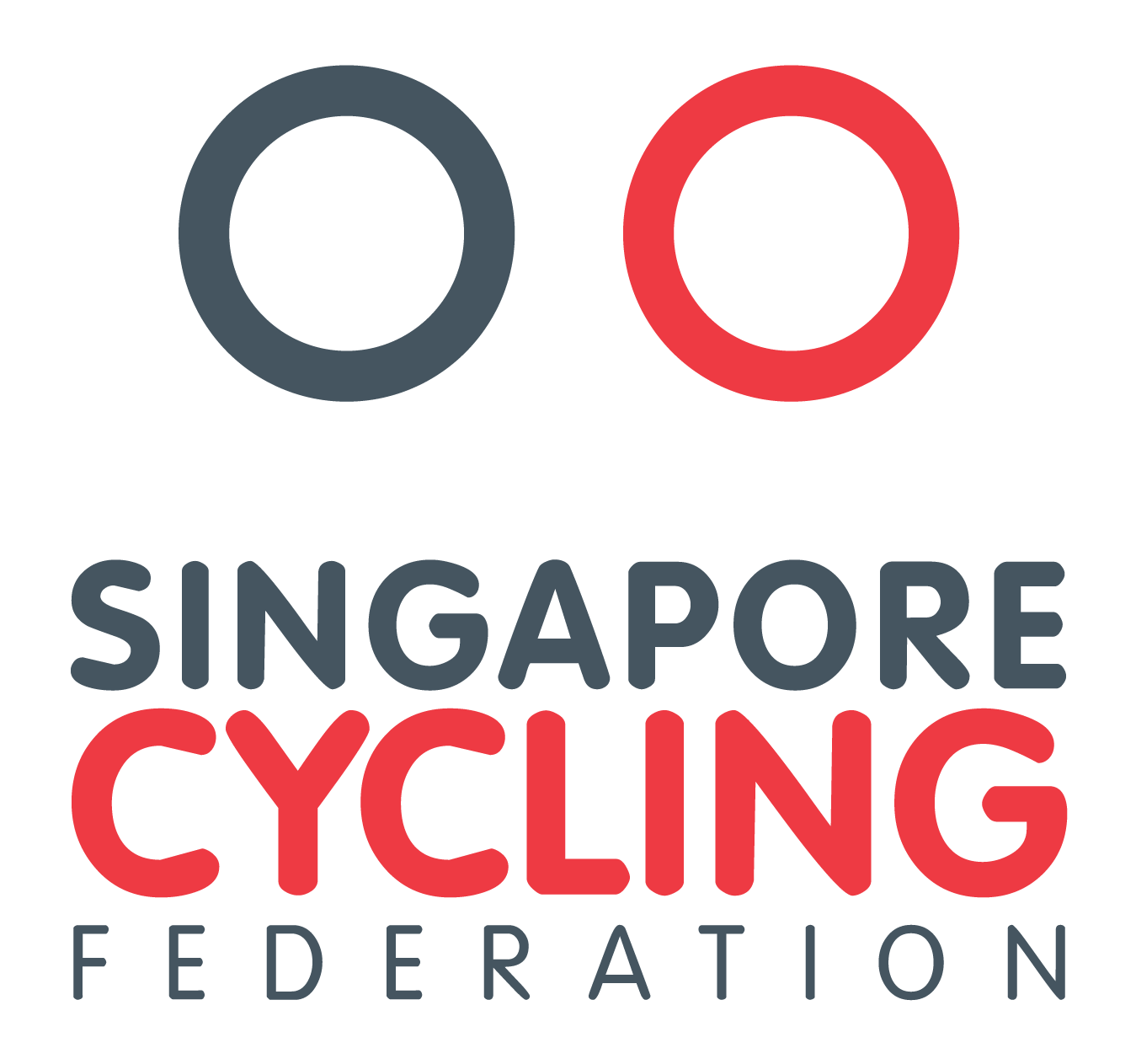
- Sport: Cycling
- Abbreviation: SCF
- Founded: January 21, 1958
- Affiliation: Singapore National Olympic Council
- Regional affiliation: Asean Cycling Association, Asian Cycling Confederation, Union Cycliste Internationale
- Affiliation date: Renewed annually
- Headquarters: 5 Stadium Drive #02-44 OCBC Arena, Singapore 397631
- Location: Singapore
- President: Dr. Hing Siong Chen
- Replaced: Singapore Amateur Cycling Association (SACA)
- (founded): 1958

Official website
- www.singaporecycling.org.sg
- (Singapore)
- Formerly Singapore Amateur Cycling Association (SACA)

The Singapore Cycling Federation (SCF) (formerly the Singapore Amateur Cycling Association (SACA) is the national governing body for the promotion and development of the sport of cycling (BikeTrial, BMX, MTB, Road and Track) in Singapore, and is affiliated to the Singapore National Olympic Council (SNOC), the Asean Cycling Association (ACA), the Asian Cycling Confederation (ACC) and Union Cycliste Internationale (UCI).

The SCF is also a Charity and an Institution of Public Character (IPC).

== History ==
The Singapore Amateur Cycling Association (SACA) was established on 21 January 1958 as a society and was registered under the Charities Act. In 2011, it underwent a name change to the Singapore Cycling Federation to reflect a new image and objectives of the cycling fraternity to be more than just amateurs.

The SCF is recognised by Sport Singapore as the national governing body for the promotion and development of the sport of cycling. It is affiliated to the Singapore National Olympic Council, the ASEAN Cycling Association, the Asian Cycling Confederation, and the Union Cycliste Internationale.

On 3 December 2018, the SCF received the Charity Transparency Awards 2018 from the Charity Council.

On 4 August 2021, the SCF collaborated with the Singapore Cybersports & Online Gaming Association (SCOGA) to announce the setting up of a cycling esports academy. This is to promote the development of cycling esports in Singapore, and had its first demonstration cycling esports race on 7 August 2021.

== Presidents ==
- 2011 to 2012: Victor Yew
- 2013 to 2015: Suhaimi Haji Said
- 2015 to 2017: Jeffrey Goh Leng Soo (Currently "Patron")
- 2017 to present: Dr Hing Siong Chen
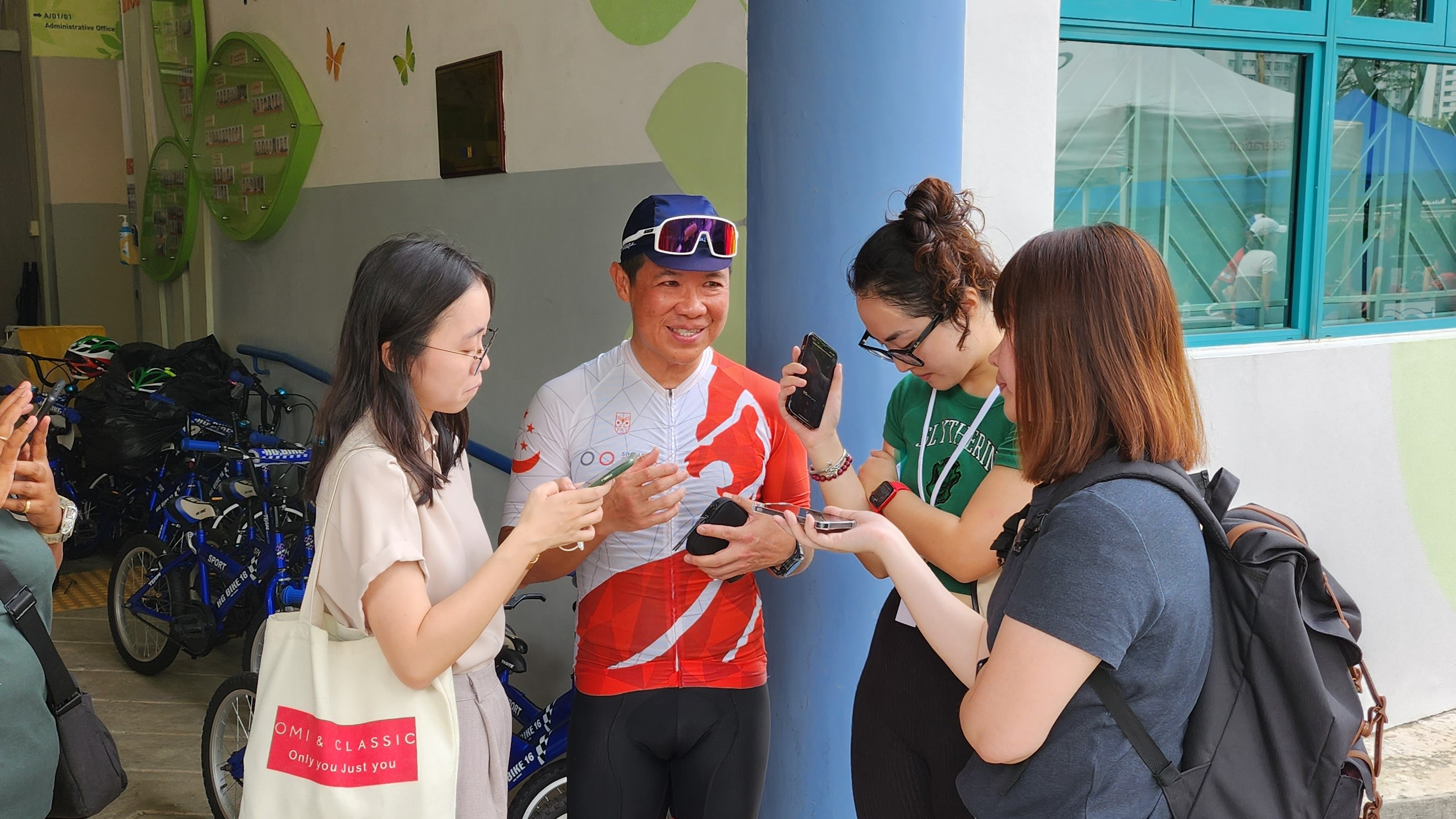
  Dr Hing Siong Chen giving interview to media at APSN Delta Senior School on 16 April 2023

== Affiliated Clubs (Full Members) ==
- BikeTrial Singapore
- Bike Labz
- Harding MTB Racing Team
- Integrated Riding Club
- ITE Cycle @ College Central
- NEX Cycling Team
- Paracycling Federation of Singapore
- Safe Cycling Task Force
- T3 Team Turtle
- Team Cycledelic
- YBCO | BikeAid Developmental Racing Team
- OCBC Cycling Team

== Affiliate Clubs (Associate Members) ==
- Burgeon MTB
- Ministry of Cycling
- 5THIRTY
- 30Forty Cycling Team
- Mavericks Cycling Club Ltd – “Specialised Dynasty Mavericks”
- Greyhounds Cycling Club
- ANZA Cycling – “ANZARacing”
- matadorRACING
- Allied World Racing
- Team Twenty9er Racing
- Team Garcia
- Crank Dynasty
- Wolfpack_SG

== Competition achievements ==
2019 Southeast Asian Games:

- Goh Choon Huat: two bronze medals for men's individual mass start road race and time trial
- Luo Yiwei: silver in team time trial

== BMX Academy ==
A BMX Academy is being built at Brickland, Choa Chu Kang and expected to be completed in 2025.
