= Lebanese Cycling Federation =

Governing body of cycle racing in Lebanon

Fédération Libanaise de Cyclisme (Lebanese Cycling Federation or FELICYC) is the national governing body of cycle racing in Lebanon. It is a member of the UCI and the Asian Cycling Confederation.
