= Bimal Mukherjee =

Indian explorer (1903–1987)

Bimal Mukherjee বিমল মুখার্জী
- Born: Bimal Mukherjee; 1903; Berhampur, Ganjam district
- Died: 1987 (aged 83–84); Calcutta, West Bengal
- Occupation: Explorer

Bimal Mukherjee (Bengali: বিমল মুখার্জী; 1903–1987) was the first Indian globe trotter to travel the entire world on a bicycle from the year 1926 to 1937.

== Career ==
Mukherjee was born in Odisha. His ancestral house was at Pataldanga street, Kolkata, West Bengal. The world voyage started on bicycle from Town Hall, Calcutta on 12 December 1926 and halted at Chandannagar for the first night. He and his three friends Ashok Mukherjee, Ananda Mukherjee and Manindra Ghosh had crossed the Bohemian Alps in bicycles wearing flannel shirts and no woolen clothing in the month of December. They had kept warm by cycling vigorously and alternated keeping one hand in their pockets to prevent frostbite. When asked how they did the amazing feat. He had replied, "We are carrying the sun rays from India!".

== Books ==
He wrote the book Du Chakay Duniya about his experiences which was published in 1978.

== See also ==
- Ramnath Biswas
- Rajesh Chandrasekar
- Chandan Biswas
- Mae Carl Jemison
