= Macau Cycling Association =

Sports governing body in Macau

The Macau Cycling Association (Association de Ciclismo de Macao) is the governing body of cycle racing in Macau.

It is a member of the UCI and the Asian Cycling Confederation.
