= Nepal Cycling Association =

Governing body for cycling sport in Nepal

- Sport: Cycle racing/Track Championships
- Category: Cycling sports
- Jurisdiction: (Nepal) National
- Abbreviation: NCA
- Founded: 1995
- Affiliation: UCI
- Regional affiliation: Asian Cycling Confederation
- President: Sudip Paudel

Official website
- www.nepalcycling.org.np
- (Nepal)

The Nepal Cycling Association is the national governing body of cycle racing in Nepal. The association is responsible for developing and promoting the sport of cycling in Nepal and the selection of players for international competitions.

The association organised the annual National MTB Downhill Competition and recently conducted the 19th National MTB Downhill Championship.

== Affiliated associations ==
There are currently 22 district associations affiliated with Nepal Cycling Association.

S.N	Province	Affiliate District Association	President
1	Koshi Province	Morang District Cycling Association; Sankhuwasabha District Cycling Association; Sunsari District Cycling Association; Okhadhunga District Cycling Association; Udayapur District Cycling Association	
2	Madhesh Province		
3	Bagmati Province	Dhading District Cycling Association; Dolakha District Cycling Association; Kathmandu District Cycling Association; Kavrepalanchok District Cycling Association; Makawanpur District Cycling Association; Nuwakot District Cycling Association; Rasuwa District Cycling Association; Sindupalchowk District Cycling Association	
4	Gandaki Province	Kaski District Cycling Association; Manang District Cycling Association; Mustang District Cycling Association; Tanahu District Cycling Association; Palpa District Cycling Association	
5	Lumbini Province	Banke District Cycling Association; Nawalparasi District Cycling Association; Rupendehi District Cycling Association	
6	Karnali Province	Surkhet District Cycling Association	
7	Sudurpashchim Province		

== Major events ==
- Kora Challenge Official Website

== See also ==
- Pushkar Shah
