= Meenakshi Rohilla =

Indian track cyclist

Personal information
- Born: Meenakshi Rohilla; 25 June 2002 (age 24) Haryana, India
- Height: 176 cm (5 ft 9 in)
- Weight: 56 kg (123 lb)

Cycling career
- Sport: Cycling
- Discipline: Track
- Role: Rider
Medal record
Representing India
Women's track cycling
Asian Championships
Bronze medal – third place	2022 New Delhi	Team pursuit
Asia Cup
Gold medal – first place	2023 Suphan Buri	Scratch
Gold medal – first place	2023 Suphan Buri	Omnium
Gold medal – first place	2023 Suphan Buri	Points race
Gold medal – first place	2023 Suphan Buri	3 km pursuit

Meenakshi Rohilla (born 25 June 2002) is an Indian track cyclist. She is a four-time gold medalist at the Asia Cup and a bronze medalist at the Asian Championships.

== Early life ==
Rohilla was born on 25 June 2002 in Haryana, India.

== Career ==
In 2022, Rohilla participated in the Asian Championships and won a bronze in the team pursuit event. She also finished 5th in the 3 km pursuit 7th in the omnium race.

She was a part of the cycling contingent at both the 2022 Commonwealth Games. At the 2023 Asian Championships, she finished 12th in the omnium event and 6th in the 3 km pursuit and team pursuit events. At the 2023 Asia Cup, she won four golds in scratch, points race, omnium, and the 3 km pursuit.

Rohilla came very close to two more medals by finishing 4th in both the 3 km pursuit and the team pursuit events at the 2024 Asian Championships. Despite the close calls, she set a new national record in the pursuit race with a timing of 3:42.5s. She qualified for the World Championships and finished 19th in the 3 km pursuit race. The qualification was historic as India was being represented in endurance events for the first time.

== See also ==
- Cycling in India
