= Pakistan Cycling Federation =

Sports governing body in Pakistan

- Category: Cycling sports
- Jurisdiction: National/International
- Membership: 8
- Abbreviation: PCF
- Founded: 1947; 79 years ago
- Affiliation: Union Cycliste Internationale
- Regional affiliation: Asian Cycling Confederation

Official website
- www.pcf.net.pk

The Pakistan Cycling Federation is the national governing body of cycle racing in Pakistan. It was established in 1947 and is currently based in Peshawar.

== History ==
The Pakistan Cycling Federation was formed in 1947 after the independence of Pakistan. It organized the inaugural National Cycling Championship in 1948 at the time of National Games in Karachi, unaugurated by Muhammad Ali Jinnah, founder of Pakistan. Jinnah was also the first honorary president of the Pakistan Cycling Federation.

== Affiliations ==
The Pakistan Cycling Federation is affiliated with Union Cycliste Internationale, Asian Cycling Confederation, and Pakistan Sports Board.
