= Qatar Cycling Federation =

National governing body of cycle racing in Qatar

The Qatar Cycling Federation (in Arabic: الاتحاد القطري للدراجات الهوائية) is the national governing body of cycle racing in Qatar. It was officially founded in 2002. Mohammed Jaham Al-Kuwari was its president as of April 2017. Abdulaziz Saud Al Tamimi was elected as President of the Qatar Cycling and Triathlon Federation for the 2024-2028 period.

It is a member of the UCI and the Asian Cycling Confederation.
