= Gerry Glackan =

Indian field hockey player (1923–1965)

Olympic medal record

Men's Field Hockey
Gold medal – first place	1948 London	Team competition

Gerald Rudolph Glackan (8 August 1923 – 1965) was an Indian hockey player who won a gold medal at the 1948 Summer Olympics.
