= Du Chakay Duniya =

Bengali travel book

- Du Chakay Duniya Cover Page
- Author: Bimal Mukherjee
- Language: Bengali
- Genre: Travel books
- Publisher: Swarnakshar Publication
- Publication date: June 1986
- Publication place: India
- Media type: Print (Hardcover)
- Pages: 319
- ISBN: 81-86891-16-1

Du Chakay Duniya (Bengali: দু চাকায় দুনিয়া) (Meaning :The World on Two Wheels in English) is a Bengali book written by the first Indian Globe -Trotter Bimal Mukherjee (1903–1987) based on his experiences of traveling through the world on a bicycle. In 1926 Bimal Mukherjee went on an epic world tour on a bicycle. Already before that he had completed touring India on his bicycle during the period 1921–1926. Banking on a meager budget and an insatiable thirst of knowing the unknown world he went on his epic adventure of world tour. He traveled through Arab, Iran, Turkey, Syria, Britain, Iceland, Norway, Sweden, Finland, Russia, Greece, Egypt, Sudan, Italy, Switzerland, France, Denmark, Germany, United States, Colombia, Ecuador, Peru, Hawaii, Japan, China, Hong Kong, Vietnam, Thailand, Malaysia and many other countries before returning to India again in 1937. As the first Indian globe trotter he has jotted down all of his amazing and awesome experiences of globe trotting in this book.

== The Book ==
Du Chakay Duniya was edited and reprinted in Bhraman during 1995–96. After that the book was republished in 1998 under Swarnakshar Prakasani Private Limited. However, the first publication dates back to June 1986.

Du Chakay Duniya Writer : Bimal Mukherjee
First Edition	June 1986
First Swarnakshar Edition	January 1998
Second Edition	January 2003
Third Edition	January 2006
Fourth Edition	May 2009

== Foreword by the writer ==
Bimal Mukherjee First Indian Globe Trotter

== The journey ==
=== India ===
Ashok Mukherjee, Ananda Mukherjee, Manindra Ghosh and Bimal Mukherjee started their epic adventure from The Town Hall in Calcutta on 12 December 1926. Ashok Mukherjee led the team of four friends on their bicycles. They went through the temporary pool over the Hooghly River to enter Howrah as there was no bridge to cross the Hooghly river in those days. Bimal Mukherjee's mother fainted when he went to bid her goodbye. He felt very guilty at that time as he loved her, but on second thoughts he again strengthened his mind and set off on the journey. Thousands of people gathered to wish them luck and hundreds rode with them up to Chandernagore for their first night halt. They felt overweight during their first day of journey with the weight of the steel trunks on the cycle carriers along with the weight of their guns. They all abandoned a lot of goods to lighten their carriages. Next day they again set on their journey towards Bardhaman. They went off Grand Trunk Road then to visit Ranchi to bid farewell to Ashok and Ananda's relatives. Ashok and Ananda were cousins. From Ranchi they again followed G. T. Road to go through the jungles of Palamou. In that jungle they spent a night at an inspection bungalow to experience their first encounter with a tiger. They went through Uttar Pradesh being invited by many wealthy Bengali families. Also, many non-Bengali families were similarly enthusiastic about them. Everyone used to ask them that what would be the benefit when they end their journey? Very few adventurers have gone ahead keeping any benefit in their minds. Main aim behind Bimal Mukherjee and his team's adventure was (1) to prove that Bengali people were not cowards and (2) if Bengalis were to be successful then a lot of young men and women would have to believe that nothing was impossible. They reached Delhi via Benaras and Allahabad. Delhi in those times mainly consisted of the present-day old Delhi. They stayed in the care of Judge S. Das who used to be very influential. He took them to the Foreign Secretary Sir John Hayes and ensured that they were provided with all the necessary documents so that they would not be harassed by foreign governments. Sir John helped them much by writing letters to all the governments and British ambassadors to those governments up to Constantinople. They then went through the princely states. Alwar, Jaipur, Gwalior and Jhansi to name a few. Everywhere they got great reception and hospitality. In Jhansi a gorgeous young lady Ms. Pinto came to meet them riding a bicycle. She told them that she was coming from Karachi via Delhi to search for them. On asking why, the lady answered smartly that she wanted to travel the world on bicycle with them. Bimal Mukherjee could not but praise the guts of the lady, not more than 21 wearing a blouse and shorts looking like a true sportswoman. But all four of them were unanimous in their decision of not taking the risk of having an attractive young woman as their companion. Ms.Pinto was very offended at this. After having lunch with them she wished them best of luck and told them that she was amazed to see the lack of courage in them. She also told them that she would travel the world on her own if it required so. They went through Ajmer, Pushkar, Udaipur and Jodhpur thereafter to enter the great Indian desert of Thar. They wanted to experience the desert in their own country itself as they will have to come through many more deserts in their journey ahead.it was impossible to ride a bicycle in the desert. So they had to carry their cycles and walk over the heated sand all day only to cover a meagre distance of 7–8 miles. They used to walk tracking the railway line that had gone till Hyderabad of present-day Pakistan. After crossing Barmer and Mirkhaspur just as they were getting acclimatised with the desert conditions and were acknowledging the fact that how demanding the desert can be, they got to see the end of it. Finally they reached Hyderabad in present-day Pakistan. From Hyderabad they set for Karachi. On the way they were plagued with the problem of tyre puncture as the thorns of the cactus trees used to present this threat every now and then. They risked their life while crossing a railway bridge over the Indus river. It took them two hours to cross that enormous bridge over the railway lines carrying the cycles on their shoulders. If a train would have come in the span of those two hours it was death for them. Bimal Mukherjee accepts that it was a hasty decision at that point of time. They should have waited for the boats to come to cross the river. The main aim for visiting Karachi was to take a ship to Iraq or Iran. After four days of waiting they got the work of deck passengers in a ship of B. A. Company. The ship took them to the port of Basra in Iraq.
