= Netai Chand Bysack =

Indian cyclist

Netai Bysack
Personal information
- Born: 21 March 1921
- Died: 5 December 2005 (aged 84) Calcutta, India

Cycling career
- Sport: Cycling

Netai Bysack (21 March 1921 – 5 December 2005) was an Indian cyclist. He competed in four events at the 1952 Summer Olympics. He also represented India in the 1948 Olympics and the 1951 Asian Games.
