= Piloo Sarkari =

Indian cyclist (1927–2018)

Personal information
- Born: 8 June 1927
- Died: 20 August 2018 (aged 91) Ontario, Canada

Cycling career
- Sport: Cycling

Piloo Sarkari (8 June 1927 – 20 August 2018) was an Indian cyclist. He competed in the team pursuit event at the 1948 Summer Olympics.
