= Cycling Federation of India =

Sports governing body in India

- Sport: Cycling
- Jurisdiction: India
- Abbreviation: CFI
- Founded: 1946
- Affiliation: Union Cycliste Internationale
- Regional affiliation: Asian Cycling Confederation

Official website
- www.cfiindia.in
- (India)

The Cycling Federation of India is the national governing body of cycle racing in India. It is a member of the Union Cycliste Internationale and the Asian Cycling Confederation.

Cycling as a sport was introduced in India thanks to the effort of actor and sportsman Jankidas in the mid 1930s. It reached its international level when Jankidas and his manager Swami Jagan Nath participated in the 1938 British Empire Games at Sydney. With the pioneering of these two, Indian cycling was able to secure its affiliation to the National Cyclists' Union. A few years later, another stalwart, Sohrab H. Bhoot of Bombay, joined Jankidas to form the National Cyclists' Federation of India in 1946, and they registered this new body with the world governing association, the Union Cycliste Internationale.

The Cycling Federation of India then sent teams to the Olympic Games, the Asian Games, and major international cycling events – for example, the London Olympics in 1948; the Warsaw-Berlin-Prague Race (the Peace Race) such as in 1952, 1954, 1955 (where the organisers covered all expenses and so these peace races were cost-free to Indian authorities); the World Cycling Championships in Zurich 1946, Amsterdam/Valkenburg 1948 that followed the London Olympics, Cophenhagen 1949, Solingen 1954; the Medellin Cycling Championships 1956; and the 1st Asian Cycling Championship in Osaka 1961.

== Gallery ==
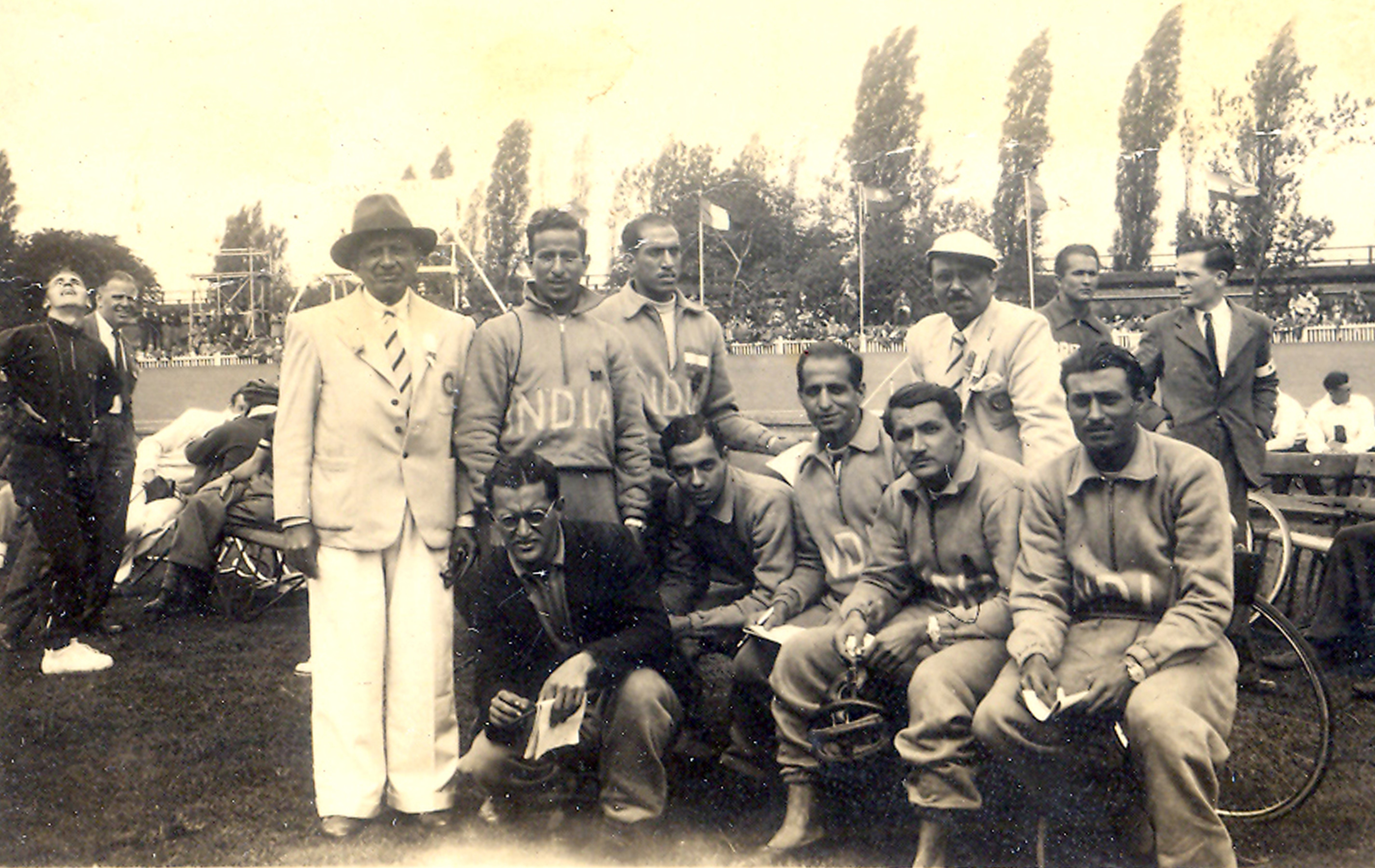
India cyclists at the 1948 Olympics (standing, l to r: Bhoot (in jacket with hat), Adi Havewala, x, Nariman Saugar (in jacket with cap); seated, l to r: x (in blazer), x, Malcolm, Mehra, x)

India cyclists at the London Olympics

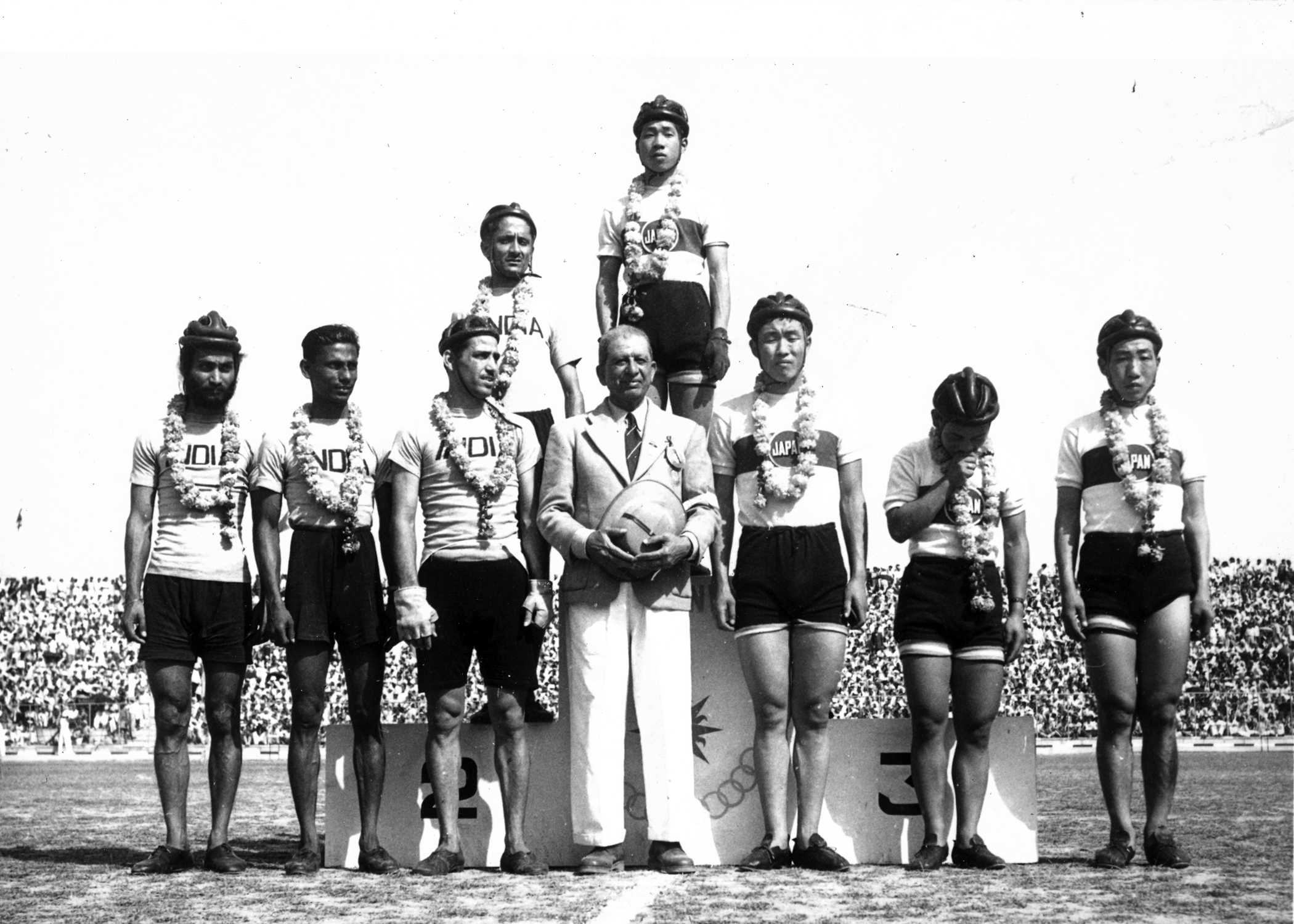
India cyclists at 1951 Asian Games – cycling team pursuit silver medallists Raj Kumar Mehra (standing on podium); Gurdev Singh, Dhangar (Lhanguard), Madan Mohan (standing left to right); and manager Bhoot (standing, fourth from left in blazer)

1952 Kassel: Indian cyclists at international event (Dhana Singh (third from left), Rusi MullaFeroze (fifth from left in glasses), Malcolm (seated to right), Bhoot (standing in blazer))

Indian cyclists enroute 1954-55 Peace Race: (Dhana Singh (fourth from left), Bhoot (second from right in coat), Papa Pawar (first from left in coat))

1954 Peace Race, first stage in Warsaw

Indian cyclists 1954: Malcolm, Bhoot
