= Reginald Rodrigues =

Indian field hockey player (1922–1995)

Medal record

Men's field hockey

Representing India

Olympic Games
Gold medal – first place	1948 London	Team Competition

Reginald Rodrigues, also known as Reg Rodricks (29 May 1922 – 15 August 1995) was an Indian field hockey player who competed in the 1948 Summer Olympics for the Indian gold medal-winning team. India had just gained its independence from Great Britain. He died on 15 August 1995 at the age of 73.
