= Rohinton Noble =

Indian cyclist (1926/1927–1975)

Personal information
- Full name: Rohinton Rustomji Noble
- Born: 1926 or 1927
- Died: 17 June 1975 India

Cycling career
- Sport: Cycling

Rohinton Rustomji Noble (1926 or 1927 – 17 June 1975) was an Indian cyclist. He competed in the time trial and the team pursuit events at the 1948 Summer Olympics.
