= Eruch Mistry =

Indian cyclist

Erach Mistry
Personal information
- Full name: Erach Jehangirji Mistry
- Born: 1922
- Died: 14 October 1993 (aged 70–71) Mumbai, Maharashtra, India

Cycling career
- Sport: Cycling

Eruch Jehangirji Mistry (1922 – 14 October 1993) was an Indian cyclist. He competed in the individual and team road race events at the 1948 Summer Olympics.
