= Jehangoo Amin =

Indian cyclist (born 1917)

Personal information
- Born: 1917

Cycling career
- Sport: Cycling

Jehangoo Amin (born 1917, date of death unknown) was an Indian cyclist. He competed in the team pursuit event at the 1948 Summer Olympics. Amin is deceased.
