= Homi Powri =

Indian cyclist (born 1922)

Personal information
- Born: 1922

Cycling career
- Sport: Cycling

Homi Powri (born 1922) was an Indian cyclist. He competed in the individual and team road race events at the 1948 Summer Olympics.
