= Bapoo Malcolm Sr. =

Indian cyclist

Malcolm Bapooji Malcolm
Personal information
- Full name: Malcolm Bapooji Malcolm
- Born: 12 December 1912 Bombay, British India
- Died: 19 January 1982 (aged 69) Mumbai, Maharashtra, India

Cycling career
- Sport: Cycling

Malcolm B Malcolm. (12 December 1912 – 19 January 1982) was an Indian cyclist. He was five times National Cycling Champion and competed for India in the 1948 Summer Olympics in the Men's individual road race, the Asian Games 1951 and the World Championships in 1954.

He was father of 6-time (1962 to 1971) national cycling champion Bapoo Malcolm and Shirin Mistry (nee Malcolm), a 3-time (1964 – 1966) National Champion cyclist.
