= Asian Cycling Confederation =

International cycling confederation in Asia

- Type: Sports federation
- Headquarters: Ipoh, MAS
- President: (Malaysia) Dato' Amarjit Singh Gill
- Parent organization: International Cycling Union

The national federations of the UCI form confederations by continent. In Asia, this body is the Asian Cycling Confederation, also shortened to ACC.

== Presidents ==
President	Country	Years	
Dr. Khaled Al-Turki	Saudi Arabia	1993	1996
Tan Sri Dato' Seri Darshan Singh Gill	Malaysia	1996	2005
Cho Hee-wook	South Korea	2005	2017
Osama AlShaafar	United Arab Emirates	2017	2025
Dato' Amarjit Singh Gill	Malaysia	2025	present

== Member federations ==
As of September 2022, the ACC consists of 45 member federations, following Bhutan's admission to the UCI. The ACC is henceforth represented in all member countries of the Olympic Council of Asia.

Country	Federation
Afghanistan	Afghanistan Cycling Federation
Bahrain	Bahrain Cycling Association
Bangladesh	Bangladesh Cycling Federation
Bhutan	Bhutan Cycling Federation
Brunei	Brunei Darussalam Cycling Federation
Cambodia	Cambodian Cycling Federation
China	Chinese Cycling Association
Chinese Taipei	Chinese Taipei Cycling Association
Hong Kong	Cycling Association of Hong Kong, China
India	Cycling Federation of India
Indonesia	Indonesian Cycling Federation
Iran	Cycling Federation of the I. R. Iran
Iraq	Iraqi Cycling Federation
Japan	Japan Cycling Federation
Jordan	Jordan Cycling Federation
Kazakhstan	Kazakhstan Cycling Federation
Kuwait	Kuwait Athletic and Cycling Federation
Kyrgyzstan	Kyrgys Cycling Federation
Laos	Lao Cycling Federation
Lebanon	Fédération Libanaise de Cyclisme
Macau	Macau Cycling Association
Malaysia	Malaysian National Cycling Federation
Maldives	Bicycle Association of Maldives
Mongolia	Mongolian Cycling Federation
Myanmar	Myanmar Cycling Federation
Nepal	Nepal Cycling Association
North Korea	Cycling Association of the Democratic People's Republic of Korea
Oman	Oman Cycling Association
Pakistan	Pakistan Cycling Federation
Palestine	Palestinian Cycling Federation
Philippines	Integrated Cycling Federation of the Philippines
Qatar	Qatar Cycling Federation
Saudi Arabia	Saudi Cycling Federation
Singapore	Singapore Cycling Federation
South Korea	Korea Cycling Federation
Sri Lanka	Cycling Federation of Sri Lanka
Syria	Syrian Arab Cycling Federation
Tajikistan	Tajikistan Cycling Federation
Thailand	Thai Cycling Association
Timor-Leste	East Timor Cycling Federation
Turkmenistan	Cycling Federation of Turkmenistan
United Arab Emirates	UAE Cycling Federation
Uzbekistan	Uzbekistan Cycling Federation
Vietnam	Vietnam Cycling Federation
Yemen	Yemen Cycling Federation

=== Representative in UCI ===
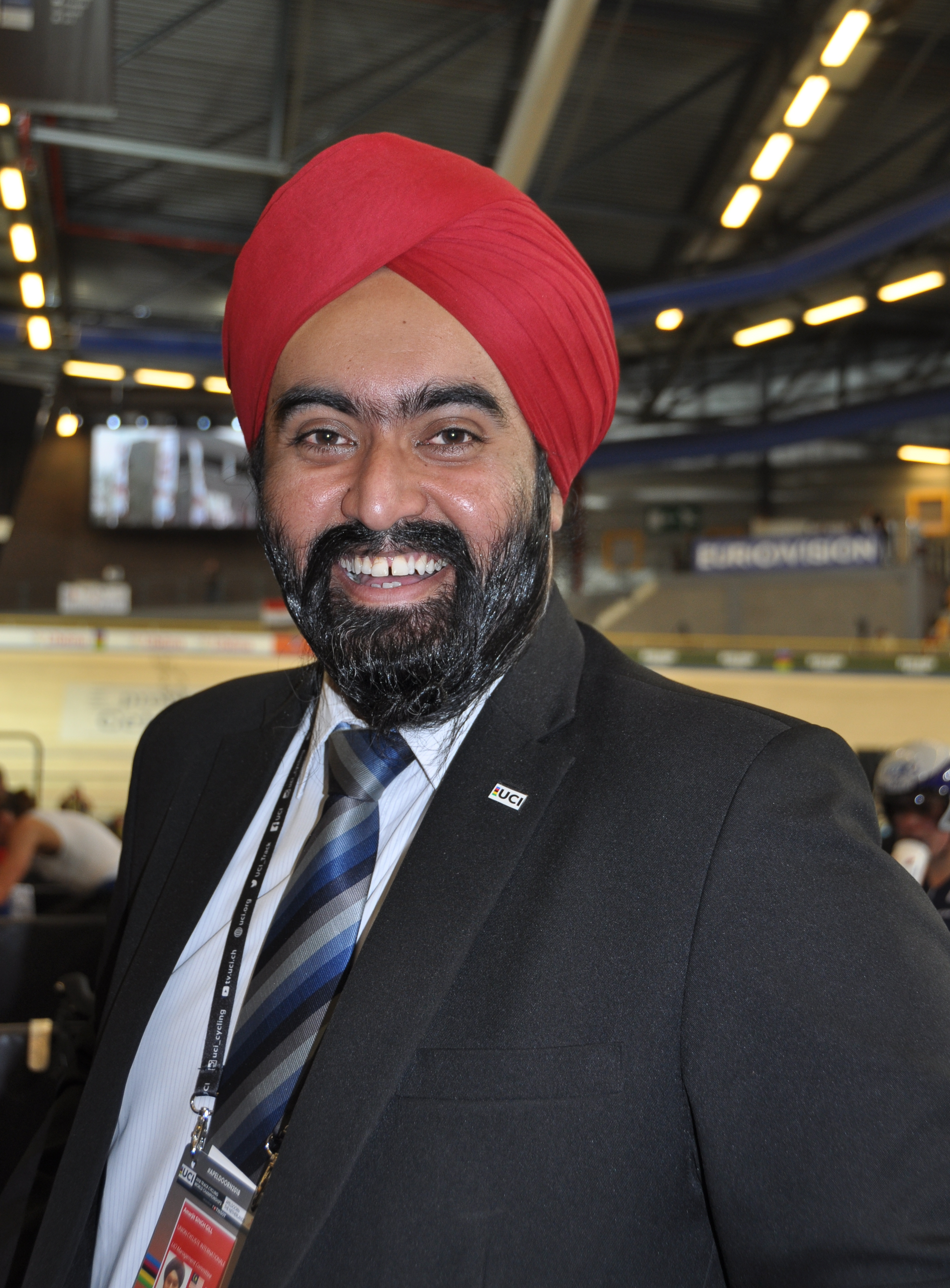
Dato' Amarjit Singh Gill (2018)

Name	Country	Years		
Osama Al Shaafar	United Arab Emirates	2017	2025	Automatically as ACC President
Dato' Amarjit Singh Gill	Malaysia	2017	present	Elected at Bergen, Norway at UCI Congress 2017 and again in 2021 in Belgium

== Tournaments ==
- ACC Track Asia Cup
- Asian Cycling Championships
