= Maxwell Trevor =

Indian cyclist

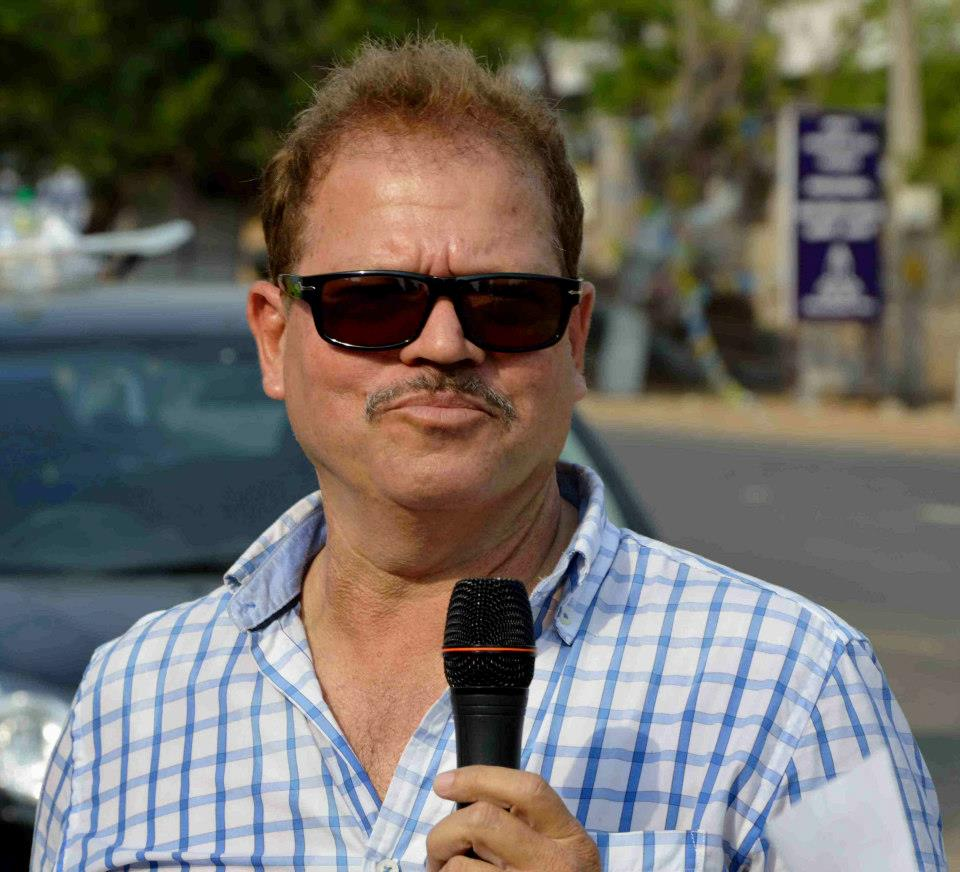
- Maxwell Trevor in 2013

Personal information
- Born: Hyderabad, India

Cycling career
- Sport: Cycling
- Current team: Retired
- Discipline: 1000 m time trial
- Role: Rider

Professional teams
- 1980–90: India
- ?: Andhra Pradesh

Major wins
- Eleven-time National Track Champion

Maxwell Trevor is an Indian cyclist. Considered one of India's best cyclists, Trevor is a national record holder, winner of more than 250 medals and an eleven-time national track champion.

== Background ==
Born in an Anglo-Indian family, Maxwell Trevor is one of six siblings. He took to cycling as a sport representing India on several occasions. Besides being inspired by Preston Tully, an international cyclist, Trevor's interest in the sport was sparked by his elder brother, Glen, who was also an international cyclist during the 1970s. With 8–10 hours of training everyday, Trevor was coached by Mumtaz Ahmed, a state-level coach, who eventually left for the United States. He has a wife and three children. One of his children, whom he trained, won the junior national title and won the third place in the south zone championships.

Trevor's foray into competitive cycling began in 1980. That year, he won the junior and senior national titles. He went on to represent India at the Asian Games, Delhi (1982) and Seoul (1986), Asian Cycling Championships, World Championships and Friendship Games.

Following his retirement from the sport, Trevor served as the coach of the Andhra Pradesh cycling team and the secretary of the state's cycling association. He also participated in activities such as promotion of Anglo-Indian culture and social campaigns such as 'Cycle to Work'. After being pursued by young cyclists, Trevor began coaching and plans to start his own academy.
