= Adi Havewala =

Indian cyclist

Personal information
- Born: 1917
- Died: 31 January 2001 (aged 83–84) Mumbai, India

Cycling career
- Sport: Cycling

Adi Havewala (1917 – 31 January 2001) was an Indian cyclist. He competed in the team pursuit event at the 1948 Summer Olympics.
