= Maxie Vaz =

Indian field hockey player (1923–1991)

Personal information
- Full name: Maximiano Vaz
- Born: 1923 Goa, Portuguese India
- Died: 21 July 1991 (aged 67–68) Mombasa, Kenya

Sport
- Sport: Field hockey
Medal record
Men's Field hockey
Representing India
Olympic Games
Gold medal – first place	1948 London	Team

Maximiano Vaz (1923 – 21 July 1991) was an Indian field hockey player who competed in the 1948 Summer Olympics.
