= Rajesh Chandrasekar =

Indian cyclist

Personal information
- Born: 25 February 1989 (age 37)

Cycling career
- Sport: Cycling
- Disciplines: Track cycling Road cycling
- Role: Rider
- Rider type: scratch

Rajesh Chandrasekar (born 25 February 1989) is an Indian male road and track cyclist. On the road he competed at the 2010 Commonwealth Games. At the track he competed in the scratch event at the 2013 UCI Track Cycling World Championships.
