= Leo Pinto =

Indian field hockey player (1914–2010)

Personal information
- Full name: Leo Hillary Knowles Pinto
- Born: 11 April 1914 Nairobi, East Africa
- Died: 10 August 2010 (aged 96) Mumbai, Maharashtra, India

Sport
- Sport: Field hockey
- Position: Goalkeeper
Senior career
Years	Team	Caps	Goals
–	Byculla Rovers	-	-
–	Lusitanians	-	-
–	Tata Sports Club	-	-
National team
Years	Team	Caps	Goals
–	India		-
Medal record
Men's Field hockey
Representing India
Olympic Games
Gold medal – first place	1948 London	Team

Leo Pinto (11 April 1914 – 10 August 2010) was an Indian field hockey player who played as a goalkeeper, who won the gold medal with the India national team at the 1948 Summer Olympics in London. During the peak of his playing days, he was rated among the best goalkeepers in the world.

== Early life ==
Pinto was born as Leo Hillary Knowles Pinto on 11 April 1914, in Nairobi, East Africa (now in Kenya). His wife's name was Jenny Pinto. He was born to a family of Goan origin from Portuguese Goa in Camarcazana, Mapusa. Pinto's family moved to Bombay (now Mumbai) when he was eight. He attended the St. Stanisalus school in Bombay and graduated in 1932, before joining the Antonio D'Souza High School in Byculla, Bombay. He played hockey, football and cricket as a kid. He, however took up hockey seriously at the age of 13, and as a goalkeeper.

== Career ==
Pinto, as a professional played his first matches in the Aga Khan Tournament with the Byculla Rovers club, at a young age. As a student of the St. Xavier's College, Mumbai, he represented the college in inter-collegiate tournaments along with his future colleagues in Indian senior national team, Owen Ferreira, Willie Fernandes and Owen Pinto. At the club level, he also played for Lusitanians Hockey Club and the Tata Sports Club. For the latter club, he played for 27 consecutive seasons and his career in club hockey lasted for 35 years.

Playing for the Indian senior team, Pinto was to make his debut in Olympic Games, at the 1936 Olympics in Berlin. But, a serious concussion sustained at one of the final trial matches ruled him out of the Games. However, he made his debut at the 1948 Olympics in London, with the team winning the gold medal. He played in three of India's five matches at the Games and conceded just one goal.

== Later years and death ==
Following his career in hockey, Pinto became a coach and a member of the national selection committee of the Indian team that won the bronze medal at the 1972 Olympics in Munich. He was also associated with the Bombay Hockey Association in the 1970s. He died in his residence in Mumbai on 10 August 2010.
