= Lebanon at the 1948 Summer Olympics =

- IOC code: LIB
- NOC: Lebanese Olympic Committee

in London, Great Britain
- Competitors: 8 in 3 sports
- Medals: Gold 0 Silver 0 Bronze 0 Total 0

Summer Olympics appearances (overview)
- 1948; 1952; 1956; 1960; 1964; 1968; 1972; 1976; 1980; 1984; 1988; 1992; 1996; 2000; 2004; 2008; 2012; 2016; 2020; 2024

Lebanon competed in the 1948 Summer Olympics in London, Great Britain, which was held from 29 July to 14 August 1948. This was the country's first appearance in the Summer Olympic Games, following Lebanon's independence in 1943. The Lebanese Olympic Committee was founded in 1946 and officially recognized by the International Olympic Committee a year later. The Lebanese delegation was made up of eight male competitors: boxer Michel Ghaoui, shooters Khalil Hilmi and Salem Salam, and wrestlers Bechara Abou Rejalie, Charif Damage, Ibrahim Mahgoub, Abdallah Sidani, and Safi Taha.

In its Summer Games debut, Lebanon failed to win any medals. Ghaoui lost his first bout in the featherweight boxing competition. Hilmi's best finish was 50th place in the 50 metre pistol event, while Salam finished 70th in the 50 metre rifle, prone event. Rejalie and Mahgoub lost their opening bouts in the lightweight freestyle wrestling and light heavyweight Greco-Roman wrestling competitions, respectively. Sidani dropped his second bout in the flyweight Greco-Roman wrestling competition, while Taha finished 6th in the featherweight Greco-Roman wrestling contest and Damage finished 4th in the lightweight Greco-Roman wrestling competition.

== Background ==
While under French administration during the 1920s, Greater Lebanon saw the formation of numerous clubs form in sports such as football, swimming, skiing, combat sports, and athletics. The first federations to organize these clubs were founded in 1933. Prior to Lebanon's first appearance in a Summer Olympic Games, an official Lebanese delegation of Lebanese Football Association representatives, led by association president Pierre Gemayel, attended the 1936 Summer Olympics in Berlin, Germany. There, Gemayel was influenced by the German people's nationalism and discipline, which influenced him to establish the right-wing Kataeb Party.

The Republic of Lebanon declared independence from France on 22 November 1943, and officially gained it on 24 October 1945. One year later, on 28 December 1946, the Lebanese Olympic Committee was founded by national decree 1350 and was officially recognized by the International Olympic Committee (IOC) on 22 November 1947. Following advice from Greek IOC representative Angelo Bolanaki, Sheik Gabriel Gemayel, of the Gemayel family, was the first president of the committee. Following recognition, Lebanon competed in its first ever Olympic Games during the 1948 Winter Olympics in St. Moritz, Switzerland.

Five months later, Lebanon sent a delegation of eight men to represent the nation for the 1948 Summer Games in London. The London Games, held from 29 July to 14 August 1948, hosted 4,104 athletes from 59 countries in 139 events. At the Games, Fawzy Shehadi served as the delegation's attaché, and the Lebanese were housed at the Greenford County School in the western borough of Ealing, along with the Greek and Syrian delegations.

== Boxing ==
Michel Ghaoui was Lebanon's sole boxing representative for the 1948 Summer Games. Despite winning the 1947 national boxing championship in the bantamweight division, he boxed in the featherweight competition for the Olympics. On 7 August at the Wembley Arena, Ghaoui faced Manuel Videla of Chile in the round of 32 match. Ghaoui lost the bout by decision. Ultimately, Ernesto Formenti of Italy won the gold medal in the event.

Athlete	Event	Round of 32	Round of 16	Quarterfinals	Semifinals	Final	
Athlete	Event	Opposition Result	Opposition Result	Opposition Result	Opposition Result	Opposition Result	Rank
Michel Ghaoui	Featherweight	Videla (CHI); L by decision	Did not advance				17

== Shooting ==
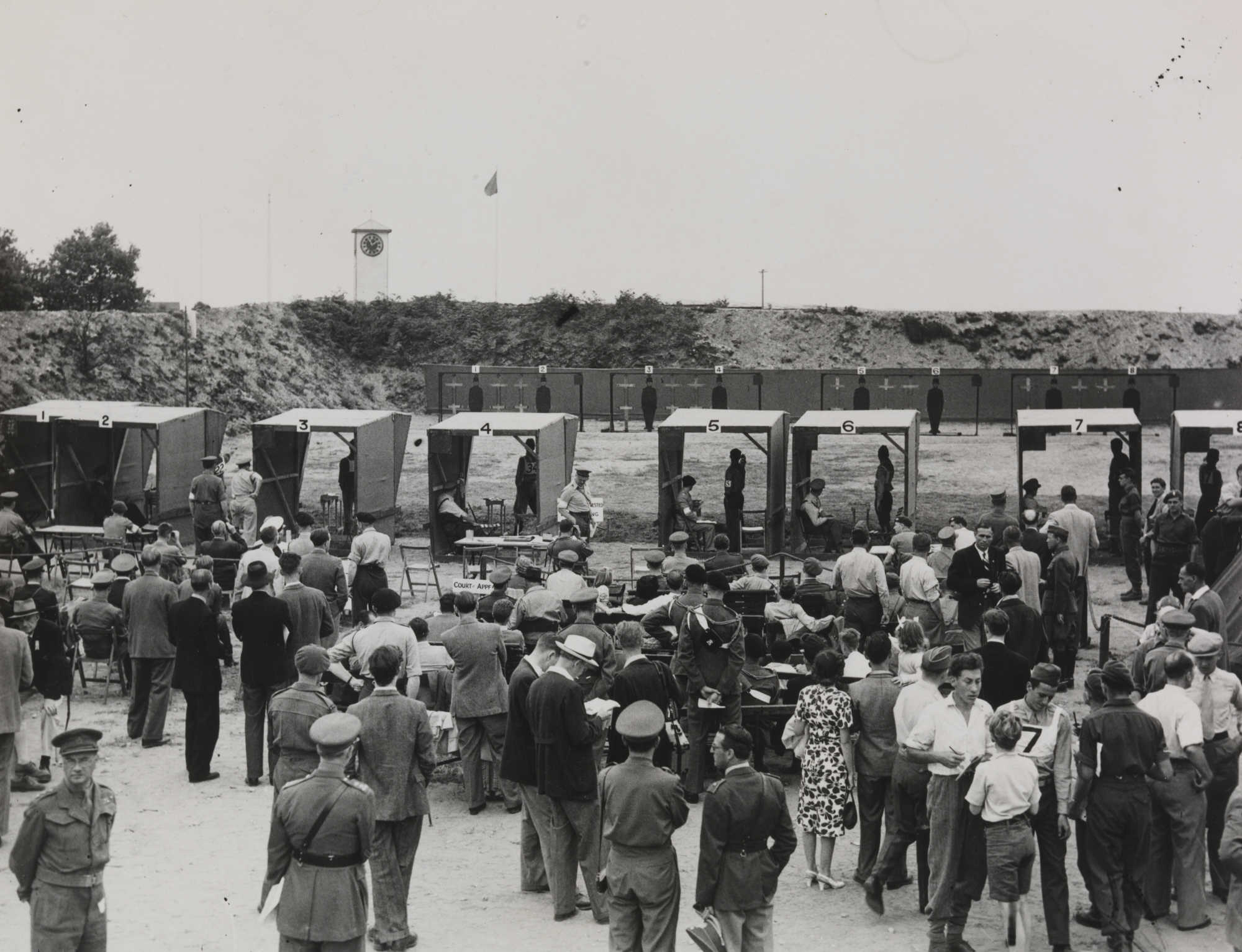
The Games' shooting events took place at the Bisley Rifle Range

Lebanon sent two shooters to the 1948 Summer Games. Khalil Hilmi competed in the Games' two pistol events. In the 50 metre pistol event on 3 August, Hilmi scored 56 out of 100 points in the first round, 56 in the second, 61 in the third, 58 in the fourth, 47 in the fifth, and 53 in the sixth. With 331 points out of a possible 600, Hilmi ranked last in the 50-person field, finishing 139 points behind the next-ranked shooter, Enrique Tejeda of Cuba. Edwin Vásquez of Peru took gold in this event, scoring 545 points. The following day, Hilmi competed in the 25 metre rapid fire pistol event. Hilmi hit 53 of the 60 targets to place him in 57th place in a field of 59. Though not factored into his ranking, Hilmi finished with a score of 228 out of 300 in the first round and 195 in the second, for a total of 423 points out of a possible 600. Gold medal-winner Károly Takács of Hungary hit all 60 targets and finished with a score of 580.

Salem Salam competed in the 50 metre rifle, prone event, on 3 August. He finished with 94 out of 100 points in the first round, 93 in the second, 89 in the third, 87 in the fourth, 87 in the fifth, and 94 in the sixth. Finishing with 544 points out of 600, he finished 70th in a field of 71, 33 points ahead of last-ranked Samad Mollazal of Iran, while 55 points behind gold medal-winner Arthur Cook of the United States.

Athlete	Event	Final	
Athlete	Event	Points	Rank
Khalil Hilmi	25 metre rapid fire pistol	423	57
Khalil Hilmi	50 metre pistol	331	50
Salem Salam	50 metre rifle, prone	544	70

== Wrestling ==
Five wrestlers competed for Lebanon during the 1948 Summer Games, with all wrestling events held at the Earls Court Exhibition Centre. Bechara Abou Rejalie was the sole freestyle wrestler for the country, who competed in the lightweight competition. In the first round on 29 July, Rejalie wrestled Kim Seog-yeong of South Korea. Rejalie retired during the match and did not return to the competition, placing him tied for 17th with José Luis Pérez of Mexico, who also withdrew after his loss. Celal Atik of Turkey won the gold medal in this event.

There were four Greco-Roman wrestlers for Lebanon. Abdallah Sidani competed in the flyweight competition. On 3 August, during the first round, he lost to Edmond Faure of France by decision, though Sidani was only marked with two points as the judges were not unanimous in their decision. However, during the second round on 4 August, he was pinned by Manuel Varela of Argentina in the ninth minute, scoring three additional points. This brought Sidani to the maximum of five points, eliminating him. Sidani ranked 10th in the competition, which was won by Pietro Lombardi of Italy.

In the featherweight contest, Safi Taha quickly pinned Raymond Strasser of Luxembourg during the first round on 3 August. Taking only 1 minute and 46 seconds, Taha's bout was the quickest of that round. His success continued in round two the following day, when he defeated Antoine Merle of France by decision, adding a point to his total. During the third round on 5 August, Taha was pinned by Georg Weidner of Austria in the eleventh minute, docking him three points. That same day, a loss to Luigi Campanella of Italy by decision in the fourth round saw Taha total seven points, eliminating him from the competition and placing him in sixth, tying him with three other wrestlers: El-Sayed Mohamed Kandil of Egypt, Egil Solsvik of Norway, and Erkki Talosela of Finland. Mehmet Oktav of Turkey won the gold in this event. Two years later, Taha would capture silver in the Greco-Roman featherweight division of the 1950 World Wrestling Championships.

Charif Damage wrestled in the lightweight competition. He started with a win in the eleventh minute by pin against Luis Rosado of Argentina in the first round on 3 August. In the second round on 4 August, Damage defeated Abraham Kurland of Denmark by decision, adding a point to his total. During the third round on 5 August, Damage defeating Ahmet Şenol of Turkey by decision, accumulating another point by doing so. During the fourth round later that day, Damage once again won by decision against Georgios Petmezas of Greece. With that win, Damage was one of the last four wrestlers in the tournament, totaling three points going into the fifth round on 6 August. However, Damage lost his matchup against Aage Eriksen of Norway by decision, putting his point total at six. While this should have eliminated him, Károly Ferencz of Hungary also lost his match, placing him at six points as well. This prompted a tie-breaker sixth round match to determine the bronze medal winner. The match ended with Damage losing to Ferencz by a non-unanimous decision, leaving Damage in fourth place, while Gustav Freij of Sweden won the gold, beating Eriksen in the final match.

In the light heavyweight division, Ibrahim Mahgoub lost to Erling Stuer Lauridsen of Denmark by decision in the first round on 3 August, costing him three points. Prior to the second round on 4 August, Maghoub failed to weigh in for his bout, disqualifying him from the contest and placing him in 11th, tied with three other wrestlers who lost both of their first two bouts: Albin Dannacher of Switzerland, Athanasios Kambaflis of Greece, and Adolfo Ramírez of Argentina. Karl-Erik Nilsson of Sweden won the gold for this event.

Key:

- VT – Victory by fall.
- VB – Victory by injury (VF for forfeit, VA for withdrawal or disqualification)
- PP – Decision by points – the loser with technical points.
- PO – Decision by points – the loser without technical points.

Athlete	Event	Round 1	Round 2	Round 3	Round 4	Round 5	Round 6	Rank
Bechara Abou Rejalie	Freestyle lightweight	Kim (KOR); L^{VA}	Did not advance					16
Abdallah Sidani	Greco-Roman flyweight	Faure (FRA); L 1-2^{PP}	Varela (ARG); L^{VT}	Did not advance				10
Safi Taha	Greco-Roman featherweight	Strasser (LUX); W^{VT}	Merle (FRA); W 3–0^{PO}	Weidner (AUT); L^{VT}	Campanella (ITA); L 0-3^{PO}	Did not advance		6
Charif Damage	Greco-Roman lightweight	Rosado (ARG); W^{VT}	Kurland (DEN); W 3-0^{PO}	Şenol (TUR); W 3-0^{PO}	Petmezas (GRE); W 3-0^{PO}	Eriksen (NOR); L 0-3^{PO}	Ferencz (HUN); L 1-2^{PP}	4
Ibrahim Mahgoub	Greco-Roman light heavyweight	Lauridsen (DEN); L 0-3^{PO}	Did not advance					11

== See also ==
- Lebanon at the 1948 Winter Olympics
