= Boxing at the 1948 Summer Olympics – Featherweight =

Boxing competitions

Men's featherweight at the Games of the XIV Olympiad
- Venue: Earl's Court; Wembley Arena
- Date: 7–13 August 1948
- Competitors: 30 from 30 nations

Medalists
1st place, gold medalist(s)		Ernesto Formenti	Italy
2nd place, silver medalist(s)		Dennis Shepherd	South Africa
3rd place, bronze medalist(s)		Aleksy Antkiewicz	Poland

The men's featherweight boxing competition at the 1948 Olympic Games in London was held from 7 to 13 August at the Empress Hall in Earl's Court and the Wembley Arena.

== Competition format ==
Like all Olympic boxing events, the competition was a straight single-elimination tournament. The competition began with a preliminary round on 7 August, where the number of competitors was reduced to 16, and concluded with a final on 13 August. As there were less than 32 boxers in the competition, a number of boxers received a bye for the preliminary round. All bouts will consist of three periods where the boxers received points for every successful punch they land on their opponent's head or upper body. The boxer with the most points at the end of the bouts wins. If a boxer is knocked to the ground and cannot get up before the referee counts to 10 then the bout is over and the opponent wins.

== Results ==
Round of 32
Benoy Bose (IND)
Francisco Núñez (ARG)	PTS
Michel Ghaoui (LIB)
Manuel Vidella (CHI)	PTS
Edgard Delannoit (BEL)
Basilio Álvez (URU)	PTS
Bob Goslin (NZL)
Eddie Johnson (USA)	RSC-3
Dennis Shepherd (RSA)	PTS
Sydney Greve (PAK)
Mohamed Ammi (FRA)	PTS
Peter Brander (GBR)
Matti Tammelin (FIN)
Laurie Birks (AUS)	PTS
Mohamed Hamouda (EGY)
Seo Byeong-ran (KOR)	PTS
Pedro García (PER)	PTS
Svend Aage Sørensen (DEN)
Leon Trani (PHI)
Aleksy Antkiewicz (POL)	PTS
Béla Farkas (HUN)
Ernesto Formenti (ITA)	PTS
Kevin Martin (IRL)	PTS
Moos Linneman (NED)
Kaare Gundersen (NOR)
Clotilde Colón (PUR)	KO-1
Jamshid Fani (IRI)
Armand Savoie (CAN)	DSQ-3

Round of 16
Eduard Kerschbaumer (AUT)	PTS
Felipe Verdú (ESP)
Francisco Núñez (ARG)	PTS
Manuel Vidella (CHI)
Basilio Álvez (URU)
Eddie Johnson (USA)	PTS
Dennis Shepherd (RSA)	PTS
Mohamed Ammi (FRA)
Laurie Birks (AUS)
Seo Byeong-Ran (KOR)	KO-2
Pedro García (PER)
Aleksy Antkiewicz (POL)	PTS
Ernesto Formenti (ITA)	PTS
Kevin Martin (IRL)
Clotilde Colón (PUR)
Armand Savoie (CAN)	PTS

Quarter-finals
Eduard Kerschbaumer (AUT)
Francisco Núñez (ARG)	PTS
Eddie Johnson (USA)
Dennis Shepherd (RSA)	PTS
Seo Byeong-Ran (KOR)
Aleksy Antkiewicz (POL)	PTS
Ernesto Formenti (ITA)	PTS
Armand Savoie (CAN)

Semi-finals
Francisco Núñez (ARG)
Dennis Shepherd (RSA)	PTS
Aleksy Antkiewicz (POL)
Ernesto Formenti (ITA)	PTS

Final
Dennis Shepherd (RSA)
Ernesto Formenti (ITA)	PTS
Third place
Aleksy Antkiewicz (POL)	PTS
Francisco Núñez (ARG)
