= Safi Taha =

Lebanese wrestler (1923–2009)

Personal information
- Nationality: Lebanese
- Born: 23 December 1923 Beirut, Lebanon
- Died: 22 February 2009 (aged 85) Pompano Beach, Florida, U.S.

Sport
- Sport: Wrestling
Medal record
Men's Greco-Roman wrestling
Representing Lebanon
World Championships
Silver medal – second place	1950 Stockholm	Featherweight

Safi J. Taha (Arabic: صافي طه; 23 December 1923 – 22 February 2009) was a Lebanese wrestler. As a wrestler, he would be one of the first Lebanese Olympians after he had competed at the 1948 Summer Olympics. He would reach the fourth round of the men's Greco-Roman featherweight division but would be eliminated after being defeated. After the 1948 Summer Games, he would compete at the 1950 World Wrestling Championships and win silver.

Taha would also compete at the 1952 Summer Olympics but would eventually withdraw in the third round of his event despite leading over the course of it. Later on, he would be awarded the Order of Merit due to his service in sport. After that, he would move to the United States in 1954 and became a national champion. Later on, he would become a coach in both Lebanon and the United States, eventually coaching the Lebanese wrestling team for the 1961 Pan Arab Games.

== Biography ==
Safi J. Taha was born on 23 December 1923 in Beirut, Lebanon. Stated by Olympedia, Taha was a top national and international wrestler during the late 1940s and early 1950s. Taha would compete at the 1948 Summer Olympics in London, Great Britain, representing Lebanon in wrestling. This would be Lebanon's first Olympic appearance, making Taha one of the first Lebanese Olympians. His brother, Khalil Taha, was also a competitive wrestler.

He would compete in the men's Greco-Roman featherweight division from 3 to 6 August 1948. Taha would compete against Raymond Strasser for his first round and would win by fall in 1:46. Taha would then advance to the second round, defeating Antoine Merle by decision, 3–0. He would then lose against Georg Weidner in the third round but would advance after his placement was higher than any of the other losing contestants. In the fourth round, he would then be defeated by Luigi Campanella, ending Taha's Olympic run at the 1948 Summer Games. He would place equal sixth. After the 1948 Summer Games, he would win a silver medal at the 1950 World Wrestling Championships in the featherweight category, placing behind wrestler Olle Anderberg.

Taha would also compete at the 1952 Summer Olympics in Helsinki, Finland, competing in the same event. He would compete until the third round, where he would withdraw from the event despite being in the lead of the event. Later on, Taha had won a gold medal in a tournament in Istanbul, he would be awarded the Order of Merit due to his service in sport, in competition and for his efforts to popularize it within the nation.

He would immigrate from Lebanon to the United States in 1954. There, he would win a national title and became a coach in both the United States and Lebanon. As a coach, he would coach the Lebanese wrestling delegation that competed at the 1961 Pan Arab Games and won multiple medals. Taha would later die on 22 February 2009 in Pompano Beach, United States.
