= Wrestling at the 1948 Summer Olympics – Men's Greco-Roman featherweight =

Wrestling at the Olympics

Men's Greco-Roman featherweight at the Games of the XIV Olympiad
- Venue: Empress Hall, Earls Court Exhibition Centre
- Dates: 3–6 August 1948
- Competitors: 17 from 17 nations

Medalists
| 1st place, gold medalist(s) | | Mehmet Oktav | Turkey |
| 2nd place, silver medalist(s) | | Olle Anderberg | Sweden |
| 3rd place, bronze medalist(s) | | Ferenc Tóth | Hungary |

The men's Greco-Roman featherweight competition at the 1948 Summer Olympics in London took place from 3 August to 6 August at the Empress Hall, Earls Court Exhibition Centre. Nations were limited to one competitor. Featherweight was the third-lightest category, including wrestlers weighing 57 to 62 kilograms (125.7 to 136.7 lb).

This Greco-Roman wrestling competition continued to use the "bad points" elimination system introduced at the 1928 Summer Olympics for Greco-Roman and at the 1932 Summer Olympics for freestyle wrestling, with the slight modification introduced in 1936. Each round featured all wrestlers pairing off and wrestling one bout (with one wrestler having a bye if there were an odd number). The loser received 3 points if the loss was by fall or unanimous decision and 2 points if the decision was 2-1 (this was the modification from prior years, where all losses were 3 points). The winner received 1 point if the win was by decision and 0 points if the win was by fall. At the end of each round, any wrestler with at least 5 points was eliminated.

== Results ==
=== Round 1 ===
Bouts

| Winner | Nation | Victory Type | Loser | Nation |
|---|---|---|---|---|
| Erkki Talosela | Finland | Decision, 3–0 | El-Sayed Mohamed Kandil | Egypt |
| Henk Dijk | Netherlands | Decision, 3–0 | Omar Blebel | Argentina |
| Luigi Campanella | Italy | Fall | Antonios Gryllos | Greece |
| Egil Solsvik | Norway | Decision, 3–0 | Adolf Müller | Switzerland |
| Safi Taha | Lebanon | Fall | Raymond Strasser | Luxembourg |
| Ferenc Tóth | Hungary | Decision, 2–1 | Jan Stehlík | Czechoslovakia |
| Antoine Merle | France | Fall | Jack Mortimer | Great Britain |
| Olle Anderberg | Sweden | Fall | Georg Weidner | Austria |
| Mehmet Oktav | Turkey | Bye | N/A | N/A |

Points

| Rank | Wrestler | Nation | Start | Earned | Total |
|---|---|---|---|---|---|
| 1 | Olle Anderberg | Sweden | 0 | 0 | 0 |
| 1 | Luigi Campanella | Italy | 0 | 0 | 0 |
| 1 | Antoine Merle | France | 0 | 0 | 0 |
| 1 | Mehmet Oktav | Turkey | 0 | 0 | 0 |
| 1 | Safi Taha | Lebanon | 0 | 0 | 0 |
| 6 | Henk Dijk | Netherlands | 0 | 1 | 1 |
| 6 | Egil Solsvik | Norway | 0 | 1 | 1 |
| 6 | Erkki Talosela | Finland | 0 | 1 | 1 |
| 6 | Ferenc Tóth | Hungary | 0 | 1 | 1 |
| 10 | Jan Stehlík | Czechoslovakia | 0 | 2 | 2 |
| 11 | Omar Blebel | Argentina | 0 | 3 | 3 |
| 11 | Antonios Gryllos | Greece | 0 | 3 | 3 |
| 11 | El-Sayed Mohamed Kandil | Egypt | 0 | 3 | 3 |
| 11 | Jack Mortimer | Great Britain | 0 | 3 | 3 |
| 11 | Adolf Müller | Switzerland | 0 | 3 | 3 |
| 11 | Raymond Strasser | Luxembourg | 0 | 3 | 3 |
| 11 | Georg Weidner | Austria | 0 | 3 | 3 |

=== Round 2 ===
Bouts

| Winner | Nation | Victory Type | Loser | Nation |
|---|---|---|---|---|
| Mehmet Oktav | Turkey | Decision, 3–0 | Erkki Talosela | Finland |
| El-Sayed Mohamed Kandil | Egypt | Decision, 3–0 | Henk Dijk | Netherlands |
| Antonios Gryllos | Greece | Decision, 2–1 | Omar Blebel | Argentina |
| Luigi Campanella | Italy | Decision, 2–1 | Egil Solsvik | Norway |
| Ferenc Tóth | Hungary | Fall | Jack Mortimer | Great Britain |
| Georg Weidner | Austria | Fall | Raymond Strasser | Luxembourg |
| Safi Taha | Lebanon | Decision, 3–0 | Antoine Merle | France |
| Olle Anderberg | Sweden | Bye | N/A | N/A |
| N/A | N/A | Over weight | Adolf Müller | Switzerland |
| N/A | N/A | Retired | Jan Stehlík | Czechoslovakia |

Points

| Rank | Wrestler | Nation | Start | Earned | Total |
|---|---|---|---|---|---|
| 1 | Olle Anderberg | Sweden | 0 | 0 | 0 |
| 2 | Luigi Campanella | Italy | 0 | 1 | 1 |
| 2 | Mehmet Oktav | Turkey | 0 | 1 | 1 |
| 2 | Safi Taha | Lebanon | 0 | 1 | 1 |
| 2 | Ferenc Tóth | Hungary | 1 | 0 | 1 |
| 6 | Antoine Merle | France | 0 | 3 | 3 |
| 6 | Egil Solsvik | Norway | 1 | 2 | 3 |
| 6 | Georg Weidner | Austria | 3 | 0 | 3 |
| 9 | Henk Dijk | Netherlands | 1 | 3 | 4 |
| 9 | Antonios Gryllos | Greece | 3 | 1 | 4 |
| 9 | El-Sayed Mohamed Kandil | Egypt | 3 | 1 | 4 |
| 9 | Erkki Talosela | Finland | 1 | 3 | 4 |
| 13 | Omar Blebel | Argentina | 3 | 2 | 5 |
| 13 | Jan Stehlík | Czechoslovakia | 2 | 3 | 5 |
| 15 | Jack Mortimer | Great Britain | 3 | 3 | 6 |
| 15 | Adolf Müller | Switzerland | 3 | 3 | 6 |
| 15 | Raymond Strasser | Luxembourg | 3 | 3 | 6 |

=== Round 3 ===
Bouts

| Winner | Nation | Victory Type | Loser | Nation |
|---|---|---|---|---|
| Mehmet Oktav | Turkey | Fall | Olle Anderberg | Sweden |
| Erkki Talosela | Finland | Fall | Henk Dijk | Netherlands |
| El-Sayed Mohamed Kandil | Egypt | Fall | Antonios Gryllos | Greece |
| Luigi Campanella | Italy | Decision, 2–1 | Ferenc Tóth | Hungary |
| Egil Solsvik | Norway | Decision, 3–0 | Antoine Merle | France |
| Georg Weidner | Austria | Fall | Safi Taha | Lebanon |

Points

| Rank | Wrestler | Nation | Start | Earned | Total |
|---|---|---|---|---|---|
| 1 | Mehmet Oktav | Turkey | 1 | 0 | 1 |
| 2 | Luigi Campanella | Italy | 1 | 1 | 2 |
| 3 | Olle Anderberg | Sweden | 0 | 3 | 3 |
| 3 | Ferenc Tóth | Hungary | 1 | 2 | 3 |
| 3 | Georg Weidner | Austria | 3 | 0 | 3 |
| 6 | El-Sayed Mohamed Kandil | Egypt | 4 | 0 | 4 |
| 6 | Egil Solsvik | Norway | 3 | 1 | 4 |
| 6 | Safi Taha | Lebanon | 1 | 3 | 4 |
| 6 | Erkki Talosela | Finland | 4 | 0 | 4 |
| 10 | Antoine Merle | France | 3 | 3 | 6 |
| 11 | Henk Dijk | Netherlands | 4 | 3 | 7 |
| 11 | Antonios Gryllos | Greece | 4 | 3 | 7 |

=== Round 4 ===
Bouts

| Winner | Nation | Victory Type | Loser | Nation |
|---|---|---|---|---|
| Olle Anderberg | Sweden | Fall | Erkki Talosela | Finland |
| Mehmet Oktav | Turkey | Decision, 3–0 | El-Sayed Mohamed Kandil | Egypt |
| Luigi Campanella | Italy | Decision, 3–0 | Safi Taha | Lebanon |
| Ferenc Tóth | Hungary | Fall | Egil Solsvik | Norway |
| Georg Weidner | Austria | Bye | N/A | N/A |

Points

| Rank | Wrestler | Nation | Start | Earned | Total |
|---|---|---|---|---|---|
| 1 | Mehmet Oktav | Turkey | 1 | 1 | 2 |
| 2 | Olle Anderberg | Sweden | 3 | 0 | 3 |
| 2 | Luigi Campanella | Italy | 2 | 1 | 3 |
| 2 | Ferenc Tóth | Hungary | 3 | 0 | 3 |
| 5 | Georg Weidner | Austria | 3 | 0 | 3 |
| 6 | El-Sayed Mohamed Kandil | Egypt | 4 | 3 | 7 |
| 6 | Egil Solsvik | Norway | 4 | 3 | 7 |
| 6 | Safi Taha | Lebanon | 4 | 3 | 7 |
| 6 | Erkki Talosela | Finland | 4 | 3 | 7 |

=== Round 5 ===
Bouts

| Winner | Nation | Victory Type | Loser | Nation |
|---|---|---|---|---|
| Mehmet Oktav | Turkey | Decision, 2–1 | Georg Weidner | Austria |
| Olle Anderberg | Sweden | Fall | Luigi Campanella | Italy |
| Ferenc Tóth | Hungary | Bye | N/A | N/A |

Points

| Rank | Wrestler | Nation | Start | Earned | Total |
|---|---|---|---|---|---|
| 1 | Olle Anderberg | Sweden | 3 | 0 | 3 |
| 1 | Mehmet Oktav | Turkey | 2 | 1 | 3 |
| 1 | Ferenc Tóth | Hungary | 3 | 0 | 3 |
| 4 | Georg Weidner | Austria | 3 | 2 | 5 |
| 5 | Luigi Campanella | Italy | 3 | 3 | 6 |

=== Round 6 ===
Of the three remaining wrestlers, Oktav had previously defeated Anderberg but Tóth had faced neither. Oktav received the bye in the sixth round. Anderberg beat Tóth, eliminating the latter. With two men who had already faced each left, previous head-to-head results were decisive and Oktav received the gold medal. (A Tóth victory over Anderberg in this round would have set up a seventh round pitting Tóth against Oktav.)

Bouts

| Winner | Nation | Victory Type | Loser | Nation |
|---|---|---|---|---|
| Olle Anderberg | Sweden | Fall | Ferenc Tóth | Hungary |
| Mehmet Oktav | Turkey | Bye | N/A | N/A |

Points

| Rank | Wrestler | Nation | Start | Earned | Total |
|---|---|---|---|---|---|
| 1st place, gold medalist(s) | Mehmet Oktav | Turkey | 3 | 0 | 3 |
| 2nd place, silver medalist(s) | Olle Anderberg | Sweden | 3 | 0 | 3 |
| 3rd place, bronze medalist(s) | Ferenc Tóth | Hungary | 3 | 3 | 6 |
