= Dennis Shepherd =

South African boxer

Personal information
- Born: 11 October 1926 Johannesburg, South Africa
- Died: 12 June 2006 (aged 79) Johannesburg, South Africa
Medal record
Men's Boxing
Representing South Africa
Olympic Games
Silver medal – second place	1948 London	Featherweight

Dennis Shepherd (11 October 1926 – 12 June 2006) was a South African boxer who won the silver medal in the featherweight division at the 1948 Summer Olympics in London. Shepherd died at age 79 in Lichtenburg.

== 1948 Olympic results ==
Below is the record of Dennis Shepherd, a South African featherweight boxer who competed at the 1948 London Olympics:

- Round of 32: Defeated Sydney Greve (Pakistan) on points
- Round of 16: Defeated Mohamed Ammi (France) on points
- Quarterfinal: Defeated Eddie Johnson (United States) on points
- Semifinal: Defeated Francisco Nunez (Argentina) on points
- Final: Lost to Ernesto Formenti (Italy) on points (was awarded silver medal)

Shepherd continued to box as an amateur until 1950 when he was eliminated in the opening round of the British Empire Games in Auckland, New Zealand. He subsequently retired from boxing without having embarked on a professional career.
