= Shooting at the 1948 Summer Olympics – Men's 50 metre pistol =

Olympic shooting event

Men's 50 metre pistol at the Games of the XIV Olympiad
- Shooting pictogram
- Venue: National Shooting Centre
- Date: 2 August 1948
- Competitors: 50 from 22 nations
- Winning score: 545

Medalists
1st place, gold medalist(s)		Edwin Vásquez; Peru
2nd place, silver medalist(s)		Rudolf Schnyder; Switzerland
3rd place, bronze medalist(s)		Torsten Ullman; Sweden

The men's ISSF 50 meter pistol was a shooting sports event held as part of the Shooting at the 1948 Summer Olympics programme. It was the seventh appearance of the event. The competition was held on 2 August 1948 at the shooting ranges at London. 50 shooters from 22 nations competed. Nations had been limited to three shooters each since the 1932 Games. The event was won by Edwin Vásquez of Peru in the nation's debut in the free pistol. Vásquez is still (through the 2020 Games) the only Peruvian athlete to win a gold medal at an Olympic Games. Rudolf Schnyder of Switzerland took silver. Defending champion Torsten Ullman of Sweden earned bronze, the second man to win multiple medals in the event.

== Background ==
This event marked the seventh appearance of the ISSF 50 meter pistol at the Olympic Games. It was featured in every Summer Olympics from 1896 to 1920 (excluding 1904, when no shooting events were held) and from 1936 to 2016. The event was officially open to female competitors between 1968 and 1980, though participation by women during this period was minimal. A separate women's competition was introduced in 1984. The only exceptions to the standard 50-metre distance were the 1896 and 1908 Games, which used 30 metres and 50 yards, respectively.

Despite the 12-year gap between Olympic Games due to World War II, four of the top 10 competitors from the 1936 event returned: gold medalist Torsten Ullman of Sweden, fourth-place finisher Marcel Bonin of France, seventh-place Georgios Stathis of Greece, and ninth-place Sándor Tölgyesi of Hungary. Ullman was also the reigning world champion, having reclaimed the title in 1947 after previously winning in 1933, 1935, and 1937. Oscar Bidegain of Argentina had finished second in the 1947 World Championships.

Five nations—Cuba, Lebanon, Peru, Puerto Rico, and Spain—made their debut in the event. Greece and the United States each competed for the sixth time, tied for the most appearances by any country.

Vásquez used a Hämmerli MP33 pistol.

== Competition format ==
The competition had each shooter fire 60 shots, in 6 series of 10 shots each, at a distance of 50 metres. The target was round, 50 centimetres in diameter, with 10 scoring rings. Scoring for each shot was up to 10 points, in increments of 1 point. The maximum score possible was 600 points. The time limit for each series of 10 shots was 20 minutes. Any pistol was permitted. Ties were broken first by bulls-eyes (7s and above), then by 10s, then by 9s, etc.

== Records ==
Prior to this competition, the existing world and Olympic records were as follows.

World record	Torsten Ullman (SWE)	559	Berlin, Germany	7 August 1936
Olympic record	Torsten Ullman (SWE)	559	Berlin, Germany	7 August 1936

No new world or Olympic records were set during the competition.

== Schedule ==
Date	Time	Round
Monday, 2 August 1948	9:00	Final

== Results ==
The three-way tie for second was broken first by bulls-eyes (7s and above, the middle 20 cm diameter); Benner had 58 while Schnyder and Ullman had both put all 60 shots in the target area, so the American placed fourth and the other two continued to the next tie-breaker. There, the advantage went to Schnyder with 21 10s against Ullman's 16.

Rank	Shooter	Nation	Score
1st place, gold medalist(s)	Edwin Vásquez	Peru	545
2nd place, silver medalist(s)	Rudolf Schnyder	Switzerland	539
3rd place, bronze medalist(s)	Torsten Ullman	Sweden	539
4	Huelet Benner	United States	539
5	Beat Rhyner	Switzerland	536
6	Ángel León Gozalo	Spain	534
7	Ambrus Balogh	Hungary	532
8	Marcel Lafortune	Belgium	530
9	Federico Grüben	Argentina	527
10	Eino Saarnikko	Finland	527
11	Sture Nordlund	Sweden	527
12	Walter Walsh	United States	525
13	Lajos Börzsönyi	Hungary	525
14	Sándor Tölgyesi	Hungary	525
15	Heinz Ambühl	Switzerland	524
16	Oscar Bidegain	Argentina	523
17	Quentin Brooks	United States	523
18	Ignacio Cruzat	Chile	522
19	Klaus Lahti	Finland	522
20	Väinö Skarp	Finland	520
21	Guy Granet	Great Britain	519
22	Lars Berg	Sweden	517
23	John Gallie	Great Britain	517
24	Jacques Mazoyer	France	516
25	Martin Gison	Philippines	514
26	Albert von Einsiedel	Philippines	512
27	Wenceslao Salgado	Peru	512
28	Silvino Ferreira	Brazil	511
29	Marcel Bonin	France	511
30	Gunnar Svendsen	Norway	510
31	Álvaro dos Santos Filho	Brazil	509
32	Vangelis Khrysafis	Greece	509
33	Nikolaos Tzovlas	Greece	508
34	César Injoque	Peru	507
35	Juan Rostagno	Argentina	507
36	Stefano Margotti	Italy	503
37	Luis Ruiz Tagle	Chile	502
38	Luis Palomo	Spain	501
39	Miguel Barasorda	Puerto Rico	501
40	Roberto Müller	Chile	497
41	Herman Schultz	Monaco	495
42	Moysés Cardoso	Portugal	485
43	Peter Marchant	Great Britain	484
44	Georgios Stathis	Greece	484
45	Mauritz Amundsen	Norway	483
46	Carlos Queiroz	Portugal	482
47	Godofredo Basso	Cuba	477
48	R. Stéphan	France	477
49	Enrique Tejeda	Cuba	470
50	Khalil Hilmi	Lebanon	331
