= Karl Gotch =

Belgian professional wrestler, amateur wrestling, and coach (1924–2007)

- Born: Charles Istaz; August 3, 1924; Antwerp, Belgium
- Died: July 28, 2007 (aged 82); Tampa, Florida, U.S.
- Occupations: Professional wrestler, amateur wrestler, wrestling trainer
- Children: 1
- Professional wrestling career
- Ring name(s): Karel Istaz; Karl Gotch; Karl Krauser; Pierre LeMarin
- Billed height: 6 ft 1 in (185 cm)
- Billed weight: 245 lb (111 kg)
- Billed from: Hamburg, Germany
- Trained by: The Snake Pit (Billy Joyce, Billy Riley); Frank Wolfe
- Debut: Before 1951
- Retired: January 1, 1982

Charles Istaz (Note: Also rendered as Karl or Karel Istaz.) (August 3, 1924 – July 28, 2007), known by the ring name Karl Gotch (カール・ゴッチ, Kāru Gotchi), was a Belgian and American professional wrestler, catch wrestler, amateur wrestler, and trainer. Considered one of the most influential wrestlers of his time period, he is best known for training several acclaimed and influential professional wrestlers in Japan, and for becoming a catalyst in the faculty development of strong style, alongside New Japan Pro-Wrestling founder Antonio Inoki and fellow trainer Billy Robinson.

Gotch represented Belgium at the 1948 Summer Olympics in both freestyle and Greco-Roman wrestling. He learned catch-as-catch-can and professional wrestling at the Snake Pit under Billy Riley and Billy Joyce. He was given the ring name "Gotch" by Ohio promoter Al Haft in honor of American wrestler Frank Gotch. In Japan, he became known as a "God of Wrestling" alongside Billy Robinson and Lou Thesz, due to their collective influence on Japanese professional wrestling.

Gotch had significantly influenced the development of modern mixed martial arts (MMA), especially in Japan. Several of Gotch's students, which included Satoru Sayama, Masakatsu Funaki, Minoru Suzuki, Akira Maeda, and Nobuhiko Takada, established pioneering MMA promotions and training schools to transmit Gotch's training. Examples included Sayama's Shooto and Funaki and Suzuki's Pancrase—both of which predate the UFC— along with Maeda's Fighting Network RINGS and Takada's Pride Fighting Championships (PRIDE), the latter being one of the most popular MMA promotions of all time.

== Early life ==
Istaz was born in Antwerp, Belgium on August 3, 1924. His father, Edward, was a sailor of Hungarian ancestry who was employed to the Belgian Naval Component; his mother, Johanna (née van Heisteren), was an Imperial German citizen who had majority Dutch ancestry. At a young age and at the advice of his father, he became embroiled in competition at a tavern in Antwerp that was home to a collective of grapplers and boxers. At the same time, he had his left pinky finger amputated due to an accident at a port. The accident would result in Gotch adopting an unorthodox style of grappling for the rest of his life.

In 1940, he and his family were transported by Nazi German forces from Antwerp to Hamburg, Germany after the German invasion of Belgium. He had been given the role of a railway worker near the Neuengamme concentration camp. According to his student Akira Maeda, Istaz was taught sambo from a Soviet prisoner of war also held in camp. He was let go in 1943, and took up a blacksmithing job. He and his family were transported yet again soon afterwards, now transported to the REIMAHG-A plant in Walpersberg, near Kahla. He was let go after the liberation of Belgium, and once again took up blacksmithing.

== Amateur wrestling ==
Istaz took up Greco-Roman wrestling at the United Athletes of Antwerp, initially as a Light heavyweight. He won several national amateur titles, both as a light heavyweight and later a heavyweight, between 1946 and 1950. He competed at the 1946 European Wrestling Championships in Stockholm, Sweden as a light heavyweight, where he was defeated.

As Karel Istaz ('Karel' is the Flemish Dutch variation of 'Charles' or 'Karl'), he represented Belgium at the 1948 Summer Olympics in London in both freestyle and Greco-Roman wrestling once again as a Light heavyweight, notably losing to eventual silver medalists Fritz Stöckli and Kelpo Gröndahl in freestyle and Greco-Roman respectively. His only win at the Olympics via technical outcome was a decision win over Athanasios Kambaflis in freestyle. Notable people who attended those Olympics included Verne Gagne, Dick Hutton, and Maurice "Mad Dog" Vachon.

Other parts of Istaz's life prior to the Olympics remain unclear, and has been subject to embellishment by pro wrestling magazines.

== Professional wrestling career ==
=== Europe and the United States ===
Istaz was initially hesitant to becoming a professional wrestler, considering he wanted to advance his career in amateur wrestling and be "vengeful" for his losses in the European and Olympic championships. However, when Istaz realized of the financial capabilities of wrestling as a professional compared to being an amateur wrestler for his wife Ella and daughter Janine, he took it up. Istaz's professional wrestling career began after training at renowned catch wrestler Billy Riley's gym, which was later dubbed by Gotch as "The Snake Pit". Gotch met Alf Robinson around this time, Billy Robinson's uncle and a fellow wrestler, and told Gotch to come to Wigan. From 1951 to 1959, Karl lived in Wigan near the gym. He debuted before 1951, wrestling throughout Europe under his real name and under the ring name Karl Krauser, and winning titles including the German Heavyweight Championship and the European Championship. In 1959, Istaz moved to Montreal, Quebec, Canada, in order to migrate over to the United States.

When Istaz arrived in the United States on March 15, 1960, he began wrestling as Karl Gotch, named for Frank Gotch, by premier Ohio promoter-wrestler Al Haft. A friend of Frank Gotch, Haft was given the ring-name Young Gotch in some of his days as a wrestler, and Haft thought that Karl had intense similarities with Frank; thus, Karl was given the ring-name as tribute. In the United States, Gotch's wrestling style and lack of showmanship held him back, and he did not experience any great popularity at the time. In 1961, he won the American Wrestling Alliance (Ohio) World Heavyweight Championship. Gotch held the belt for two years before dropping the title in a title unification match to NWA World's Heavyweight Champion Lou Thesz, one of the few American wrestlers he respected because of the similarities of their styles (the two also share a Hungarian heritage). In 1962, Gotch was involved in a backstage altercation with the then-NWA World Champion "Nature Boy" Buddy Rogers, in which Rogers was injured. The incident alienated Gotch from American promoters, and he began looking for work in Japan with assistance from Dr. Bill Miller. Afterwards, he had continued to travel. He wrestled in Australia under the Karl Krauser persona, and in 1965 he defeated Spiros Arion to win the International Wrestling Alliance's Heavyweight Championship.

He returned to the United States for a stint in the 1970s, with a brief run in the World Wide Wrestling Federation from August 1971 to February 1972. On December 6, 1971, he teamed with Rene Goulet to win the WWWF World Tag Team Championship from the inaugural champions, Luke Graham and Tarzan Tyler, in two straight falls of a best-two-out-of-three-falls match in Madison Square Garden. They lost the championship on February 1, 1972, to Baron Mikel Scicluna and King Curtis Iaukea.

=== Japan ===
He had begun working in Japan by 1961, travelling with Don Leo Jonathan, where he became very popular due to his sport wrestling style. He represented Germany in the 1961 JWA World Big League; although he did speak German, he still retained his Belgian citizenship. While Rikidozan was still alive, Antonio Inoki had met Gotch, and took an interest to his methods. Gotch gave Inoki a specialized maneuver that he'd be able to use in his matches, which would later cataclyze into what became known as the Cobra twist or Manji-gatame (卍固め, Suastika hold). Inoki began to use the move in 1968; the next year, Inoki took Gotch's German suplex hold, the bridging version of the traditional German suplex. He moved to Japan temporarily in two stints between 1967 and 1969, and headed the JWA Dojo, which had been given the name the "Gotch Clinic". He specialized in training active professionals. Many of the people Gotch worked with in the "clinic" included Seiji Sakaguchi, Kim Duk, Katsuji Adachi, and Hishakaku Otsubo.

Gotch had begun to be exhausted and frustrated with wrestling industry politicking and had a disdain for promoters' salary rates and rejection of talent opportunities. He had begun to teach more about the style and philosophy of his version of professional wrestling, without the use of politicking in the workers. He became politically neutral in all matters. Inoki had tried to clean up specific economic situations in JWA, which was said to be a contribution to its collapse. Yoshino Sato and Kokichi Endo, the heads of JWA, fired Inoki for alleging that he'd "betray" JWA and claim JWA for himself. In January 1972, Inoki went to Philadelphia, Pennsylvania, whilst Karl Gotch was travelling with the WWWF. Inoki went to Gotch for help, to assist him in starting a wrestling promotion. Gotch accepted to assist him on the condition he be a trainer and coach to the wrestlers, and left the tour and WWWF afterward. The negotiations in January 1972 resulted in the creation of New Japan Pro-Wrestling (NJPW). He wrestled in the main event of the very first show held by NJPW on March 6, 1972, defeating Inoki. Karl was able to bring in stars like Lou Thesz, André The Giant, and Billy Robinson for the promotion of the new brand. By 1973, JWA shut down entirely.

Karl temporarily lived near the NJPW dojo, akin to his time in the JWA dojo. His first students included Yoshiaki Fujiwara and Tatsumi Fujinami. Fujiwara wanted to become a pro wrestler after a failed career in restauranteering and assistance; by that period, Fujinami had been accepted as a main understudy of Antonio Inoki. Satoru Sayama, the original Tiger Mask, Masanobu Kurisu, Don Arakawa, Kuniaki Kobayashi, and Osamu Kido were later brought in as disciples of Gotch's methods as "Young Lions", and the class became his primary focus while in NJPW. Others that also took to Gotch's methods included Gran Hamada and Mr. Pogo, despite their eventual influence on separate wrestling styles (Hamada for lucharesu, Pogo for hardcore wrestling).

Yoshiaki Fujiwara eventually became close friends with Gotch, as seen and depicted in the Karl Gotch: Kamisama film by Fumi Saito; Fujiwara would become the producer of the Karl Gotch Training Book, which detailed the training methods used by Gotch on him and his dojo-mates. He also developed a close relationship with Joe Malenko, who was touted as being a junior to Gotch in generational senses. Malenko paid tribute to Gotch after his death by appearing at numerous ceremonies honoring him over the years since 2007.

=== Retirement ===
His final match occurred on January 1, 1982, when he pinned Yoshiaki Fujiwara with the German suplex. Throughout the 1970s and 1980s, Gotch kept his role as both the head booker and sole trainer for NJPW. Whilst he still maintained a great relationship with NJPW, he also had major collaborative efforts with some of his students projects. He was present for numerous of Nobuhiko Takada's matches whilst he wrestled in the Universal Wrestling Federation and UWF-I, including numerous Pro-Wrestling World Heavyweight Championship matches (many of which also were spearheaded by Lou Thesz). He became a driving spiritual force for the creation of Newborn UWF, Akira Maeda's Fighting Network RINGS, Fujiwara's Pro Wrestling Fujiwara Gumi, and Satoru Sayama's Shooto, which predated the UFC by 8 years.

Minoru Suzuki and Masakatsu Funaki, two students of Gotch, approached Gotch in his Odessa home about them starting a new hybrid wrestling-martial arts promotion; and whilst Gotch liked the idea, he could not travel to Japan on a regular basis. However, he did coin them the name Pancrase. As a tribute, Minoru Suzuki started to use the cradle piledriver, which he coined as the Gotch-style Piledriver (ゴッチ式パイルドライバー, Gotchi-shiki pairudoraibā) as it was a move that Gotch himself created, when he returned to pro wrestling in 2003.

== Training ==
Throughout his career and after his retirement, he dedicated himself to training several professional wrestlers. Several highly acclaimed wrestlers have credited Gotch as a trainer. The vast majority of those that were trained by Gotch transmitted his teachings onto their schools of wrestling, grappling, and mixed martial arts, including those that had trained under the New Japan Pro-Wrestling (under Inoki, Sakaguchi) and Pancrase (under Funaki, Suzuki) banners.

- Akira Maeda
- Animal Hamaguchi
- Antonio Inoki
- Barry Darsow
- Bob Backlund
- Dean and Joe Malenko
- El Canek
- Gene LeBell
- Hiro Matsuda
- Josh Barnett
- Killer Khan
- Kim Duk
- Masakatsu Funaki
- Masanobu Fuchi
- Minoru Suzuki
- Nobuhiko Takada
- Osamu Kido
- Osamu Nishimura
- Riki Choshu
- Satoru Sayama
- Scott McGhee
- Seiji Sakaguchi
- Takeshi Caesar
- Tatsumi Fujinami
- Tatsuo Nakano
- Yoshiaki Fujiwara
- Yuki Ishikawa

== Personal life & death ==
Besides his native Flemish Dutch, Istaz spoke fluent English and German, and understood Japanese. He bought a home in the mid-1980s in Odessa, Florida, nearing Tampa, and lived there until 1998. Many wrestlers stayed with Gotch in the house, including Yoshiaki Fujiwara and Tatsumi Fujinami.

Istaz was married to Ella Istaz, and had a daughter, Janine Gustave "Jennie" Istaz (b. March 22, 1950). He resided in Florida with his family until his death. Janine married Masami Soranaka (空中 正三, Soranaka Masami), also known as Mr. Soranaka or Sammy, a protégé of her father's, pro wrestler and referee. Soranaka died on June 16, 1992 of a brain tumor, aged 48. Via Janine and Soranaka, Karl has five grandchildren: Eddy Tsuyoshi Soranaka (September 1971 - September 2019), Nina Yoshiko Soranaka (b. November 1972, now Nina Porto), Joseph Yoshiaki Soranaka (b. September 1986), Maria Theresia Koharu Soranaka (b. March 1989), and Masami Saburo Soranaka (b. August 1992). Masami Saburo was born after the elder Masami had died; Janine, Masami and Nina were shown in the Fumi Saito-produced documentary about Gotch, Kamisama, in the summer of 1992. Nina gave birth to her first child in 2000, making Karl a great-grandfather whilst he was alive.

Istaz was an avid lover of pit bulls, which were introduced to him via Billy Robinson. In his will, it was made that with whatever spare money he had left that it would go to pit bull charities in Florida. A rescue fund was set up by the 501(c)(3) non-profit organization Paw'd Squad Animal Rescue in Karl's name and likeness. He cited his favorite wrestler as Finnish wrestler Waino Ketonen, referring to him as "the greatest amateur wrestler that Europe ever produced".

Istaz died on July 28, 2007, in his home in Tampa, Florida, six days before his 83rd birthday. His ashes were mostly spread in Keystone, Florida; however, in 2017, ten years after his death, some of his ashes were interred at a grave in the Honjo Ekō-in Buddhist temple in Ryōgoku, Tokyo.

== Legacy ==
=== Physical conditioning ===
Whilst he was known for his professional and catch wrestling skills, Gotch also trained in pehlwani, an Indian style of wrestling. This training led to Istaz's regime of calisthenic bodyweight exercise, which were used by wrestlers to build leg endurance and strength, such as the bridge, Hindu squats, and Hindu push-ups. Many of these practices became more widespread as Gotch continued to exercise his legacy, and the Hindu squats and bridge later became routine for several catch and professional wrestling schools. His "Gotch Bible", which was used for calisthenic and strength conditioning training in the form of playing cards, is still used today.

=== Professional wrestling ===
Karl Gotch became known as a "God" (神様, Kami-sama) in Japan. Gotch's wrestling style, alongside fellow hooker Lou Thesz, had a big impact on Inoki, who adopted and popularized his submission-based style. Some of Istaz's trainees founded the Universal Wrestling Federation in Japan in 1984, which showcased the shoot-style of professional wrestling. The success of UWF and similar promotions influenced Japanese wrestling in subsequent decades, and changed the style of matches in NJPW and All Japan Pro Wrestling. Several other professional wrestlers who had been, at some point, taught by Gotch include El Canek, Riki Choshu, Masanobu Fuchi, Bob Backlund, and brothers Joe and Dean Malenko.

Several wrestling maneuvers are attributed to Gotch, with him either innovating them or popularizing them, including:

- The German suplex. Named after Gotch, the bridging variant (which was named the German suplex hold (ジャーマン スープレックス ホールド, Jāman sūpurekkusu hōrudo) in Japan), was attributed to Gotch for its innovation. The actual German suplex itself was not innovated by Gotch, but by unspecified Finnish wrestlers (according to Gotch).
- The cradle piledriver, which also shares the name the Gotch-style Piledriver (ゴッチ式パイルドライバー, Gotchi-shiki pairudoraibā). It is the tributed signature maneuver of Gotch student Minoru Suzuki.
- The kneeling reverse piledriver, which is mostly known as the Tombstone Piledriver after the popularization of the move by The Undertaker. It was also used by the likes of Kazuchika Okada, André The Giant, and Drew McIntyre.
- The Dragon Sleeper (ドラゴン スリーパー, Doragon surīpā): a inverted north-south neck crank. It became the signature submission maneuver of Tatsumi Fujinami, and later the likes of The Undertaker (as the "Taking Care of Business") and Sanada (as the "Skull End").
- The Dragon screw legwhip (ドラゴン スクリュー, Doragon sukuryū). It was also a signature move attributed to Fujinami, as well as Keiji Mutoh and Hiroshi Tanahashi.
- The Sasori-gatame (蠍固め): a figure-four variant of the traditional single-leg Boston crab (Medio Cangrejo), it was passed down to Riki Choshu, a student of Gotch. It became anglicized as the Scorpion deathlock in the case of Ron Garvin and Sting, or the Sharpshooter in the case of Bret Hart.

Gotch was inducted into the Wrestling Observer Hall of Fame as part of the inaugural class in 1996. In 2007, he was inducted into the Professional Wrestling Hall of Fame. He became a 2009 posthumous inductee into the George Tragos/Lou Thesz Professional Wrestling Hall of Fame, and was included as a member of the International Professional Wrestling Hall of Fame in 2022.

=== Mixed martial arts ===
Gotch was a significant influence on the development of mixed martial arts (MMA) through his students, including Antonio Inoki, Satoru Sayama, Minoru Suzuki, Masakatsu Funaki, Akira Maeda, and Nobuhiko Takada. Inoki wrestled in a series of matches called ishu kakutōgi sen, where he faced martial artists representing different styles and a legitimate fight against Muhammad Ali in 1976. Inoki hired legitimate martial artists such as Gotch to train his roster and later promoted MMA. Sayama founded Shooto, a hybrid martial art system and promotion. Shooto held its first amateur events in 1985 and its first professional event in 1989, several years prior to the UFC in 1993. Suzuki and Funaki founded Pancrase, which held its first event a month before UFC 1. Maeda founded RINGS, a shoot-style wrestling promotion that became an MMA promotion. And Takada co-founded PRIDE, one of the most popular MMA promotions in history. These students and promotions shaped MMA by producing and featuring many of the top fighters of their time.

Gotch was friends and training partners with judo exponents Masahiko Kimura and Kiyotaka Otsubo, who also had tenures as professional wrestlers. Gotch was vocal in his opposition to the growing Brazilian jiu-jitsu, decrying its practitioners as "old whores waiting for a consumer" due to their usage of the guard position. He also referred to BJJ gyms as "whorehouses".

== Championships and accomplishments ==
- American Wrestling Alliance (Ohio)
  - AWA World Heavyweight Championship (1 time)
- George Tragos/Lou Thesz Professional Wrestling Hall of Fame
  - Class of 2009
- International Professional Wrestling Hall of Fame
  - Class of 2022
- National Wrestling Alliance
  - NWA Eastern Heavyweight Championship (2 times)
- New Japan Pro-Wrestling
  - Real World Championship (2 times)
  - Greatest 18 Club inductee
- Professional Wrestling Hall of Fame and Museum
  - Class of 2007
- Tokyo Sports
  - Service Award (2007)
- World Championship Wrestling (Australia)
  - IWA World Heavyweight Championship (1 time)
- World Wide Wrestling Federation
  - WWWF World Tag Team Championship (1 time) – with Rene Goulet
- Worldwide Wrestling Associates
  - WWA World Tag Team Championship (2 times) – with Mike DiBiase
- Wrestling Observer Newsletter
  - Wrestling Observer Newsletter Hall of Fame (Class of 1996)
- Other titles
  - German Heavyweight Championship (1 time)
  - European Championship (1 time)
