= Wrestling at the 1948 Summer Olympics – Men's Greco-Roman light heavyweight =

Men's Greco-Roman light heavyweight at the Games of the XIV Olympiad
- Venue: Empress Hall, Earls Court Exhibition Centre
- Dates: 3–6 August 1948
- Competitors: 14 from 14 nations

Medalists
1st place, gold medalist(s)		Karl-Erik Nilsson	Sweden
2nd place, silver medalist(s)		Kelpo Gröndahl	Finland
3rd place, bronze medalist(s)		Ibrahim Orabi	Egypt

The men's Greco-Roman light heavyweight competition at the 1948 Summer Olympics in London took place from 3 August to 6 August at the Empress Hall, Earls Court Exhibition Centre. Nations were limited to one competitor. Light heavyweight was the second-heaviest category, including wrestlers weighing 79 to 87 kilograms (174.2 to 191.8 lb).

This Greco-Roman wrestling competition continued to use the "bad points" elimination system introduced at the 1928 Summer Olympics for Greco-Roman and at the 1932 Summer Olympics for freestyle wrestling, with the slight modification introduced in 1936. Each round featured all wrestlers pairing off and wrestling one bout (with one wrestler having a bye if there were an odd number). The loser received 3 points if the loss was by fall or unanimous decision and 2 points if the decision was 2-1 (this was the modification from prior years, where all losses were 3 points). The winner received 1 point if the win was by decision and 0 points if the win was by fall. At the end of each round, any wrestler with at least 5 points was eliminated.

== Results ==
=== Round 1 ===
Bouts

Winner	Nation	Victory Type	Loser	Nation
Mustafa Avcioğlu-Çakmak	Turkey	Decision, 3–0	Adolfo Ramírez	Argentina
Karl-Erik Nilsson	Sweden	Fall	Gyula Kovács	Hungary
Umberto Silvestri	Italy	Decision, 3–0	Athanasios Kambaflis	Greece
Kelpo Gröndahl	Finland	Fall	Karel Istaz	Belgium
Erling Stuer Lauridsen	Denmark	Decision, 3–0	Ibrahim Mahgoub	Lebanon
Peter Enzinger	Austria	Fall	Albin Dannacher	Switzerland
Ibrahim Orabi	Egypt	Fall	Ken Richmond	Great Britain

Points

Rank	Wrestler	Nation	Start	Earned	Total
1	Peter Enzinger	Austria	0	0	0
1	Kelpo Gröndahl	Finland	0	0	0
1	Karl-Erik Nilsson	Sweden	0	0	0
1	Ibrahim Orabi	Egypt	0	0	0
5	Mustafa Avcioğlu-Çakmak	Turkey	0	1	1
5	Erling Stuer Lauridsen	Denmark	0	1	1
5	Umberto Silvestri	Italy	0	1	1
8	Albin Dannacher	Switzerland	0	3	3
8	Karel Istaz	Belgium	0	3	3
8	Athanasios Kambaflis	Greece	0	3	3
8	Gyula Kovács	Hungary	0	3	3
8	Ibrahim Mahgoub	Lebanon	0	3	3
8	Adolfo Ramírez	Argentina	0	3	3
8	Ken Richmond	Great Britain	0	3	3

=== Round 2 ===
Bouts

Winner	Nation	Victory Type	Loser	Nation
Gyula Kovács	Hungary	Decision, 3–0	Adolfo Ramírez	Argentina
Karl-Erik Nilsson	Sweden	Decision, 3–0	Mustafa Avcioğlu-Çakmak	Turkey
Karel Istaz	Belgium	Decision, 3–0	Athanasios Kambaflis	Greece
Kelpo Gröndahl	Finland	Retired	Umberto Silvestri	Italy
Erling Stuer Lauridsen	Denmark	Fall	Peter Enzinger	Austria
Ibrahim Orabi	Egypt	Fall	Albin Dannacher	Switzerland
Ken Richmond	Great Britain	Bye	N/A	N/A
N/A	N/A	Over weight	Ibrahim Mahgoub	Lebanon

Points

Rank	Wrestler	Nation	Start	Earned	Total
1	Kelpo Gröndahl	Finland	0	0	0
1	Ibrahim Orabi	Egypt	0	0	0
3	Erling Stuer Lauridsen	Denmark	1	0	1
3	Karl-Erik Nilsson	Sweden	0	1	1
5	Peter Enzinger	Austria	0	3	3
5	Ken Richmond	Great Britain	3	0	3
7	Mustafa Avcioğlu-Çakmak	Turkey	1	3	4
7	Karel Istaz	Belgium	3	1	4
7	Gyula Kovács	Hungary	3	1	4
10	Umberto Silvestri	Italy	1	3	4*
11	Albin Dannacher	Switzerland	3	3	6
11	Athanasios Kambaflis	Greece	3	3	6
11	Ibrahim Mahgoub	Lebanon	3	3	6
11	Adolfo Ramírez	Argentina	3	3	6

=== Round 3 ===
Bouts

Winner	Nation	Victory Type	Loser	Nation
Ken Richmond	Great Britain	Fall	Mustafa Avcioğlu-Çakmak	Turkey
Gyula Kovács	Hungary	Fall	Karel Istaz	Belgium
Karl-Erik Nilsson	Sweden	Decision, 3–0	Erling Stuer Lauridsen	Denmark
Kelpo Gröndahl	Finland	Decision, 3–0	Peter Enzinger	Austria
Ibrahim Orabi	Egypt	Bye	N/A	N/A

Points

Rank	Wrestler	Nation	Start	Earned	Total
1	Ibrahim Orabi	Egypt	0	0	0
2	Kelpo Gröndahl	Finland	0	1	1
3	Karl-Erik Nilsson	Sweden	1	1	2
4	Ken Richmond	Great Britain	3	0	3
5	Gyula Kovács	Hungary	4	0	4
5	Erling Stuer Lauridsen	Denmark	1	3	4
7	Peter Enzinger	Austria	3	3	6
8	Mustafa Avcioğlu-Çakmak	Turkey	4	3	7
8	Karel Istaz	Belgium	4	3	7

=== Round 4 ===
Bouts

Winner	Nation	Victory Type	Loser	Nation
Gyula Kovács	Hungary	Decision, 3–0	Ibrahim Orabi	Egypt
Karl-Erik Nilsson	Sweden	Fall	Ken Richmond	Great Britain
Kelpo Gröndahl	Finland	Fall	Erling Stuer Lauridsen	Denmark

Points

Rank	Wrestler	Nation	Start	Earned	Total
1	Kelpo Gröndahl	Finland	1	0	1
2	Karl-Erik Nilsson	Sweden	2	0	2
3	Ibrahim Orabi	Egypt	0	3	3
4	Gyula Kovács	Hungary	4	1	5
5	Ken Richmond	Great Britain	3	3	6
6	Erling Stuer Lauridsen	Denmark	4	3	7

=== Round 5 ===
Bouts

Winner	Nation	Victory Type	Loser	Nation
Karl-Erik Nilsson	Sweden	Fall	Ibrahim Orabi	Egypt
Kelpo Gröndahl	Finland	Bye	N/A	N/A

Points

Rank	Wrestler	Nation	Start	Earned	Total
1	Kelpo Gröndahl	Finland	1	0	1
2	Karl-Erik Nilsson	Sweden	2	0	2
3rd place, bronze medalist(s)	Ibrahim Orabi	Egypt	3	3	6

=== Round 6 ===
Bouts

Winner	Nation	Victory Type	Loser	Nation
Karl-Erik Nilsson	Sweden	Decision, 3–0	Kelpo Gröndahl	Finland

Points

Rank	Wrestler	Nation	Start	Earned	Total
1st place, gold medalist(s)	Karl-Erik Nilsson	Sweden	2	1	3
2nd place, silver medalist(s)	Kelpo Gröndahl	Finland	1	3	4
