= Ambühl =

Ambühl is a surname. Notable people include:

- Andres Ambühl (born 1983), Swiss ice hockey player
- Elias Ambühl (born 1992), Swiss freestyle skier
- Heinz Ambühl (1905–1992), Swiss sports shooter
- Joos Ambühl (born 1959), Swiss cross country skier
- Michael Ambühl (born 1951), Swiss state secretary for foreign affairs, professor
