= Clotilde Colón =

Puerto Rican boxer

Personal information
- Nationality: Puerto Rican
- Born: 3 June 1927; Cayey, Puerto Rico
- Died: 18 February 2017 (aged 89); Cidra, Puerto Rico

Sport
- Sport: Boxing

Clotilde Colón (3 June 1927 – 18 February 2017) was a Puerto Rican boxer. He competed in the men's featherweight event at the 1948 Summer Olympics. At the 1948 Summer Olympics, he defeated Kaare Gundersen of Norway, before losing to Armand Savoie of Canada.
