= Ferenc Tóth (wrestler) =

Hungarian wrestler (1909–1981)

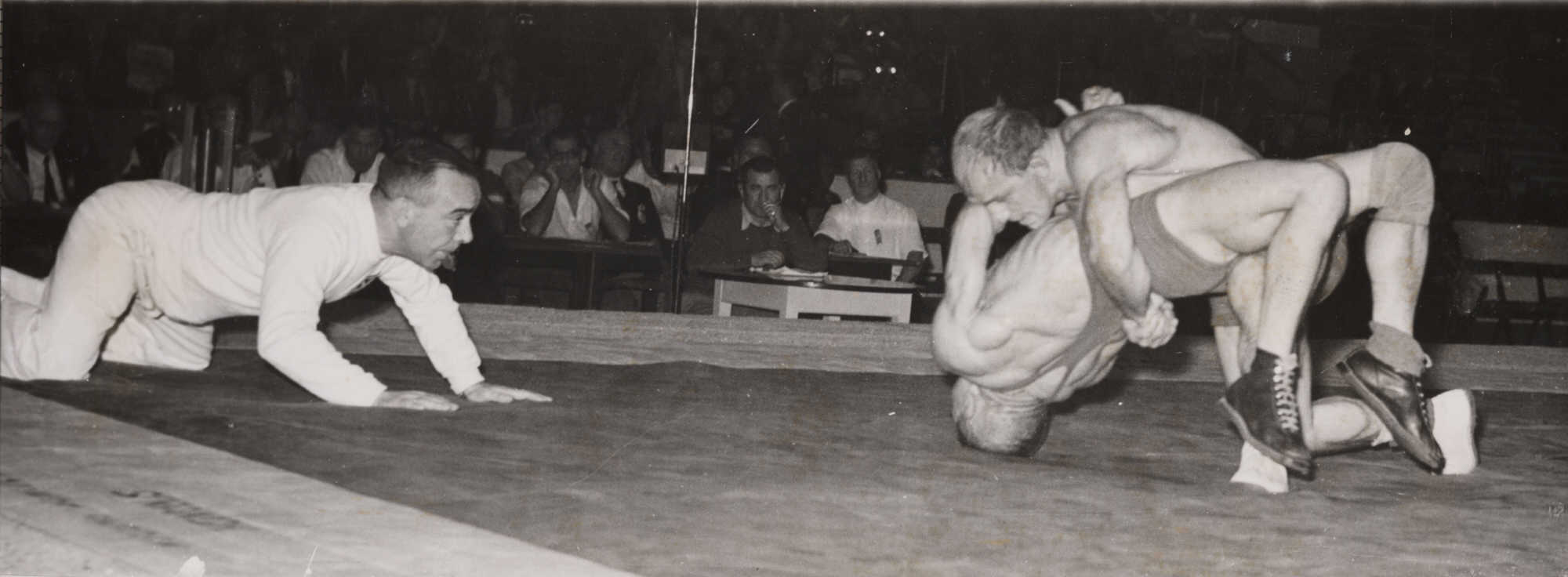
- Tóth (bottom) vs. Olle Anderberg at the 1948 Olympics

Personal information
- Born: February 8, 1909 Szeged, Hungary
- Died: February 26, 1981 (aged 72) Budapest, Hungary

Sport
- Sport: Wrestling
- Club: Újpesti TE
Medal record
Representing Hungary
Men's Greco-Roman wrestling
Olympic Games
Bronze medal – third place	1948 London	62 kg
European Wrestling Championships
Silver medal – second place	1934 Rome	61 kg
Silver medal – second place	1947 Prague	62 kg
Bronze medal – third place	1939 Oslo	61 kg
Men's freestyle wrestling
European Wrestling Championships
Gold medal – first place	1933 Paris	61 kg
Gold medal – first place	1937 Munich	61 kg
Bronze medal – third place	1934 Stockholm	61 kg
Silver medal – second place	1935 Brussels	61 kg

Ferenc Tóth (February 8, 1909 – February 26, 1981) was a Hungarian featherweight wrestler. He won a bronze medal at the 1948 Olympics in Greco-Roman wrestling, and placed 4th–5th in freestyle wrestling in 1936 and 1948. Between 1934 and 1947 Tóth won seven medals at European championships.
