= Hong Kong–Switzerland relations =

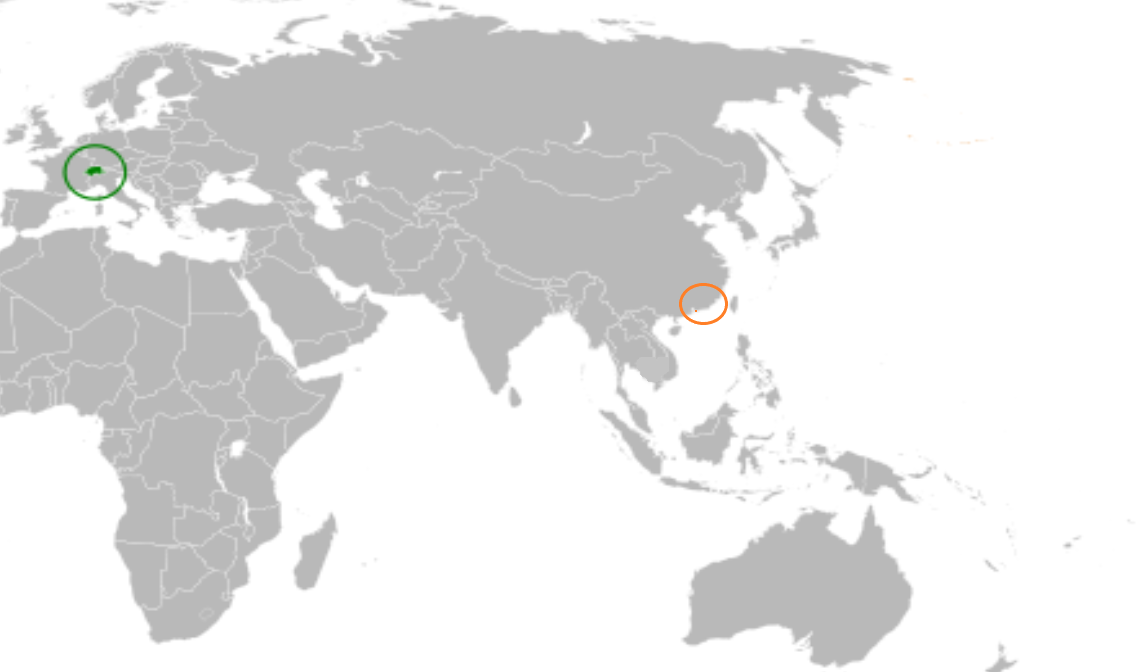
- Hong Kong: Switzerland

Hong Kong–Switzerland relations refer to international bilateral relations between Hong Kong and Switzerland.

== Historical relations ==
Switzerland's first presence in Hong Kong could be traced back to Theodor Jost, the first Apostolic Prefect of Hong Kong, as long ago as 1842. Since the beginning of the 20th century, Swiss businessmen, as well as Catholic and Protestant missionaries – most of them from the Basel Mission – settled in Hong Kong.

Trade and diplomatic relations have expanded steadily between Hong Kong and Switzerland, particularly after China became Switzerland's largest commercial partner in Asia in 2002.

The relationship deepened through various educational and cultural exchange programs, such as the annual Asian Cultural Transfer (ACT) program, which began in 2008 between The Chinese University of Hong Kong and St. Gallen University in Switzerland. Students from both countries experienced diverse cultural and academic settings through reciprocal visits, such as those in 2008 to Switzerland and Hong Kong.

Hong Kong and Switzerland have longstanding economic and diplomatic connections, reinforced by agreements such as the 2010 Comprehensive Agreement on Avoidance of Double Taxation and the 2011 Free Trade Agreement in Liechtenstein between Hong Kong and the European Free Trade Association, of which Switzerland is a member.

== Economic relations ==
Trade between Hong Kong and Switzerland grew significantly in the early 2020s, with Switzerland being a key exporter of machinery, watches, chemicals, and pharmaceuticals to Hong Kong. Additionally, business and leisure travel, along with tourism, play important roles in their economic exchanges. In 2025, Hong Kong was predicted to outperform Switzerland as the world's leading wealth hub by 2028.

The Swiss Consulate General actively supports business collaborations and safeguards Swiss economic interests in Hong Kong. Previously, Consul General Hans J. Roth spoke about "Managing Business in China," emphasizing Sino-Swiss business relations and cultural understanding.

=== Trade ===
As of 2012, imports to the European Free Trade Agreement (EFTA) states from Hong Kong amounted to 1,357 million euros, while EFTA exports also experienced substantial growth, benefiting both regions' economies.

The two entities have developed a significant trading partnership. As of 2015, Hong Kong was Switzerland's third largest export destination (7.8%), only after Germany (16%) and United States (10%). As of 2016, Switzerland was Hong Kong's 15th largest trading partner in the world. The total trade between the two places amounted to EUR 9.6 billion in 2016. A number of Swiss banks have established operations in Hong Kong since the 1960s, mainly due to the fact of Hong Kong's prominent role as a financial centre.

=== Post COVID-19 Trade ===
In 2022, Hong Kong's exports to Switzerland were predominantly in the precious metals sector, with ores, concentrates, and related materials (excluding gold) making up 52.4% of its total exports. Silver and platinum items followed at 25.5%, and jewellery at 19.4%. In contrast, Switzerland's exports to Hong Kong centered around luxury goods: watches and clocks represented 34.3% of its exports, jewellery accounted for 20.8%, and silver and platinum products for 10.6%.

Switzerland was Hong Kong's 15th largest trading partner globally and 5th in Asia in 2023, with bilateral trade reaching CHF 11.1 billion. Major exports from Hong Kong included silver and platinum (44.5%) and precious metal scrap (34.1%), while Swiss exports featured watches (34.4%) and jewellery (27.3%). In 2018, both sides signed MoUs on financial markets and fintech cooperation. By 2023, 51 Swiss regional headquarters and 209 offices were established in Hong Kong, leveraging its gateway role to China and Asia. Over five years, Switzerland's exports to Hong Kong grew by 1.53%, while Hong Kong's exports to Switzerland increased by 1.72%.

Switzerland is one of the top ten foreign direct investors in Hong Kong, which is Switzerland's third-largest trading partner in Asia. Over 250 Swiss companies operate in Hong Kong, benefiting from its status as a regional business hub.

== Political relations ==
While Switzerland follows China's "One Country, Two Systems" principle, it maintains distinct diplomatic engagement with Hong Kong.

Political relations were further facilitated by events such as Swiss students visiting the Chinese Embassy in Bern in 2008, where they discussed political and economic issues between China and Switzerland.

=== High level visits ===
From Switzerland, in July 2016, Mr Jorg Gasser, the State Secretary of the Swiss State Secretariat for International Financial Matters, visited Hong Kong. Dr Michael Ambühl, the State Secretary of the Swiss State Secretariat for International Financial Matters visited Hong Kong in July 2013.

From Hong Kong, Secretary for Commerce and Economic Development, Gregory So, visited Switzerland twice in December 2016 and January 2017. In December 2016, the Secretary for Security, Lai Tung-kwok, visited Switzerland and met with officials at the federal level responsible for refugee matters. In November 2014, the Secretary for Education, Eddie Ng visited Switzerland to look into the vocational education systems and young persons’ career development.

In 2024, Hong Kong officials attended the World Economic Forum in Davos and the UN Human Rights Council's Universal Periodic Review in Geneva.

== Cultural relations ==
Hong Kong actively participates in Swiss cultural and innovation events, such as the International Exhibition of Inventions of Geneva. Events like Art Basel Hong Kong, where Swiss bank UBS is a leading partner, highlight artistic collaborations.

=== Swiss Consulate ===
The Swiss Consulate promotes cultural exchanges, often in partnership with Pro Helvetia, the Swiss Arts Council. Programs include studio residencies for artists in Switzerland and China, exhibitions, and collaborations in music, dance, and photography.

=== Diaspora ===
As of 2021, 1.839 Swiss nationals reside in Hong Kong, which represents a decrease of 11% vs. 2019.

== Diplomatic missions ==
The Consulate General of Switzerland in Hong Kong is Switzerland's official representation for Hong Kong and Macau, while the Hong Kong Economic and Trade Office, Berlin represents Hong Kong in eight Central European countries, including Switzerland. The Hong Kong Economic and Trade Office, Geneva is mostly responsible for the WTO, the ISO, the Trade Committee of the OECD and the WMO.
