= Peter Marchant =

Peter Marchant may refer to:

- Peter Marchant (archer) (born 1961), Australian Paralympic archer
- Peter Marchant (sport shooter) (1920–1977), British sports shooter
- Pierre Marchant (1585–1661), Flemish Franciscan
