= Ernesto Formenti =

Italian boxer (1927–1989)

Olympic medal record

Men's Boxing
| Gold medal – first place | 1948 London | Featherweight |

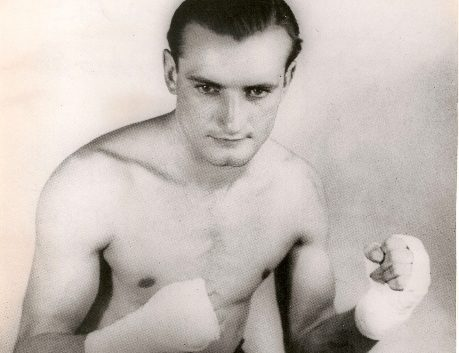

Ernesto Formenti (2 August 1927 – 5 October 1989) was an Italian boxer who won the gold medal in the featherweight division at the 1948 Summer Olympics in London.

== Amateur career ==
Formenti defeated Dennis Shepherd of South Africa in the final to become the featherweight gold medalist at the 1948 London Olympic Games.

He was born in Cesano Maderno, Italy.

== 1948 Olympic results ==
Below are the Olympic results of Ernesto Formenti, a featherweight boxer who competed for Italy at the 1948 Olympic Games in London:

- Round of 32: defeated Béla Farkas (Hungary) on points
- Round of 16: defeated Kevin Martin (boxer) (Ireland) on points
- Quarterfinal: defeated Armand Savoie (Canada) on points
- Semifinal: defeated Aleksy Antkiewicz (Poland) on points
- Final: defeated Dennis Shepherd (South Africa) on points (won gold medal)
