= 1950 World Wrestling Championships =

- Host city: Stockholm, Sweden
- Dates: 20–23 March 1950

Champions
- Greco-Roman: Sweden

The 1950 World Greco-Roman Wrestling Championship were held in Stockholm, Sweden from 20 to 23 March 1950.

== Medal table ==
Rank	Nation	Gold	Silver	Bronze	Total
1	Sweden	4	1	1	6
2	Turkey	1	4	2	7
3	Hungary	1	2	1	4
4	Egypt	1	0	2	3
5	Finland	1	0	0	1
6	Lebanon	0	1	0	1
7	Italy	0	0	1	1
7	Norway	0	0	1	1
Totals (8 entries)		8	8	8	24

== Medal summary ==
Event	Gold	Silver	Bronze
Flyweight; 52 kg	Bengt Johansson; Sweden	Ali Yücel; Turkey	Mohamed El-Ward; Egypt
Bantamweight; 57 kg	Mahmoud Hassan; Egypt	Halil Kaya; Turkey	Pietro Lombardi; Italy
Featherweight; 62 kg	Olle Anderberg; Sweden	Safi Taha; Lebanon	El-Sayed Kandil; Egypt
Lightweight; 67 kg	József Gál; Hungary	Gustav Freij; Sweden	Tevfik Yücel; Turkey
Welterweight; 73 kg	Matti Simanainen; Finland	Celal Atik; Turkey	Gösta Andersson; Sweden
Middleweight; 79 kg	Axel Grönberg; Sweden	Ali Özdemir; Turkey	Gyula Németi; Hungary
Light heavyweight 87 kg	Muharrem Candaş; Turkey	Gyula Kovács; Hungary	Trygve Andersen; Norway
Heavyweight +87 kg	Bertil Antonsson; Sweden	Gyula Bóbis; Hungary	Adil Candemir; Turkey
