= Stuer =

Stuer may refer to:

== People ==
- Eric Stuer (1953–2008), American percussionist
- Erling Stuer Lauridsen (1916–2012), Danish wrestler
- Lisbet Stuer-Lauridsen (born 1968), Danish badminton player
- Lowie Stuer (born 1995), Belgian volleyball player
- Philipp Stüer (born 1976), German rower
- Thomas Stuer-Lauridsen (born 1971), Danish badminton player

== Places ==
- Stuer, Mecklenburg-Vorpommern, Germany
