= Mohamed Hamouda =

Egyptian boxer

Personal information
- Nationality: Egyptian
- Born: Cairo, Egypt

Sport
- Sport: Boxing

Mohamed Hamouda was an Egyptian boxer. He competed in the men's featherweight event at the 1948 Summer Olympics.
