= Eino Saarnikko =

Finnish sports shooter (1908–1971)

Personal information
- Born: 28 February 1908 Viipuri, Finland (now Vyborg, Russia)
- Died: 12 August 1971 (aged 63) Järvenpää, Finland

Sport
- Sport: Sports shooting

Eino Saarnikko (28 February 1908 – 12 August 1971) was a Finnish sports shooter. He competed in the 50 m pistol event at the 1948 Summer Olympics.
