= Armand Savoie =

Canadian boxer

Personal information
- Born: 9 December 1929; Montreal, Quebec, Canada
- Died: 18 May 1988 (aged 58); Westmount, Quebec, Canada

Sport
- Sport: Boxing

Armand Savoie (9 December 1929 – 18 May 1988) was a Canadian boxer. He competed in the men's featherweight event at the 1948 Summer Olympics. At the 1948 Summer Olympics, he beat Jamshid Fani and Clotilde Colon before losing to Ernesto Formenti in the quarter-finals.
