= Väinö Skarp =

Finnish sports shooter

Personal information
- Full name: Väinö Villiam Skarp
- Born: 30 October 1908 Helsinki, Finland
- Died: 18 June 1981 (aged 72) Helsinki, Finland

Sport
- Sport: Sports shooting

Väinö Villiam Skarp (10 October 1908 – 18 June 1981) was a Finnish sports shooter. He competed in the 50 m pistol event at the 1948 Summer Olympics.
