= Luis Ruiz Tagle =

Chilean sports shooter

Personal information
- Born: 24 July 1898 Santiago, Chile

Sport
- Sport: Sports shooting

Luis Ruiz Tagle (born 28 July 1898, date of death unknown) was a Chilean sports shooter. He competed in the 50 m pistol event at the 1948 Summer Olympics.
