= Jack Mortimer (wrestler) =

British wrestler

Personal information
- Nationality: British
- Born: 17 March 1913 Bradford, England
- Died: 11 March 2007 (aged 93) Harrogate, England

Sport
- Sport: Wrestling

Jack Mortimer (17 March 1913 – 11 March 2007) was a British wrestler. He competed in the men's Greco-Roman featherweight at the 1948 Summer Olympics.
