= Oscar Bidegain =

Argentine peronist politician, sport shooter and surgeon

Governor of Buenos Aires
- In office 25 May 1973 – 24 January 1974
- Preceded by: Miguel Moragues (de facto)
- Succeeded by: Victorio Calabró

Personal details
- Born: 3 September 1905 Azul, Buenos Aires Province, Argentina
- Died: 15 December 1994 (aged 89) Azul, Buenos Aires Province, Argentina
- Party: Justicialist Party
- Profession: Surgeon

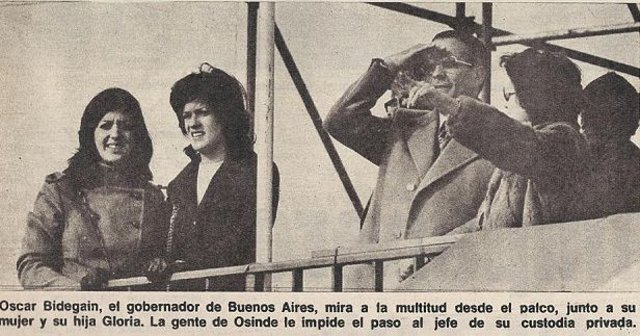
The Governor of Buenos Aires Province, Oscar Bidegain, and his family look out on the large crowd assembled to welcome former President Juan Perón from his 18-year exile on 20 June 1973. Violence later broke out at the event between left and right-wing Peronists, leading to the Ezeiza Massacre in which up to 100 people died.

Oscar Raúl Bidegain (3 September 1905 – 15 December 1994) was an Argentine peronist politician, sport shooter and surgeon. He was Governor of Buenos Aires Province from 1973 to 1974. He also competed in the 50 m pistol event at the 1948 Summer Olympics.

Bidegain's election as governor was largely thanks to the campaign of Tendencia Revolucionaria. Bidegain reciprocated by proclaiming amnesty for some incarcerated members of Tendencia Revolucionaria, a move his Peronist ally Héctor Cámpora also promised as part of his presidential campaign. However Bidegain's running mate and subsequent vicegovernor Victorio Calabró was disliked by Tendencia Revolucionaria. He was seen as a right-wing bureaucratic syndicalist.

On 20 January 1974 People's Revolutionary Army attacked the Azul garrison resulting in Perón criticizing Bidegain who resigned after being pressured by the Camber of Deputies. Victorio Calabró succeeded him as governor.
