= Leon Trani =

Filipino boxer (1920–1966)

Personal information
- Nationality: Filipino
- Born: July 19, 1920 Pastrana, Leyte, Philippine Islands
- Died: October 20, 1966 (aged 46) Cebu City, Cebu, Philippines

Sport
- Sport: Boxing
- Weight class: Featherweight

Leon Attenta Trani (July 19, 1920 – October 20, 1966) was a Filipino amateur boxer. He competed in the men's featherweight event at the 1948 Summer Olympics. At the 1948 Summer Olympics, he lost to Aleksy Antkiewicz of Poland.

Overall, Trani came in 17th place out of 30 participants. The 1948 Summer Olympics were his first and last Olympic games.

Trani died in Cebu City, Philippines on October 20, 1966, at the age of 46.
