= Rudolf Schnyder =

Swiss sport shooter

Personal information
- Born: 22 August 1919
- Died: 30 December 2000 (aged 81)

Sport
- Sport: Sports shooting
Medal record
Men's shooting
Representing Switzerland
Olympic Games
Silver medal – second place	1948 London	50 m pistol

Rudolf Schnyder (22 August 1919 – 30 December 2000) was a Swiss sport shooter. He won a silver medal in 50 metre pistol at the 1948 Summer Olympics in London. He also competed at the 1952 Summer Olympics in Helsinki.
