= Mohamed Ammi =

French boxer (born 1928)

Personal information
- Nationality: Algerian
- Born: 1928 Algiers, Algeria

Sport
- Sport: Boxing

Mohamed Ammi (born 1928) was an Algerian boxer during the colonial period of Algeria. He competed in the men's featherweight event at the 1948 Summer Olympics. At the 1948 Summer Olympics, he defeated Peter Brander of Great Britain in the Round of 32 before losing to Dennis Shepherd of South Africa in the Round of 16.
