= Pedro García (boxer) =

Peruvian boxer (born 1932)

Personal information
- Nationality: Peruvian
- Born: 1932

Sport
- Sport: Boxing

Pedro García (born 1932) is a Peruvian boxer. He competed in the men's featherweight event at the 1948 Summer Olympics.
