= Basilio Álvez =

Uruguayan boxer (1915–1976)

Personal information
- Born: Basilio Álvez Rodríguez; 11 July 1915 Tacuarembó, Uruguay
- Died: 24 November 1976 (aged 61) Montevideo, Uruguay

Sport
- Sport: Boxing

Basilio Álvez Rodríguez (11 July 1915 — 24 November 1976) was a Uruguayan boxer. He competed in the men's featherweight event at the 1948 Summer Olympics. Álvez died in Montevideo on 24 November 1976, at the age of 61.
