= Eduard Kerschbaumer =

Austrian boxer

Personal information
- Nationality: Austrian
- Born: 19 May 1920
- Died: October 1995

Sport
- Sport: Boxing

Eduard Kerschbaumer (19 May 1920 – October 1995) was an Austrian boxer. He competed in the men's featherweight event at the 1948 Summer Olympics.
