= Henk Dijk =

Dutch wrestler (1920–2001)

Personal information
- Nationality: Dutch
- Born: 4 August 1920 Amsterdam, Netherlands
- Died: 14 November 2001 (aged 81) Amsterdam, Netherlands

Sport
- Sport: Wrestling

Henk Dijk (4 August 1920 – 14 November 2001) was a Dutch wrestler. He competed in the men's Greco-Roman featherweight at the 1948 Summer Olympics.
