= Silvino Ferreira =

Brazilian sports shooter

Personal information
- Born: 1 February 1915 Rio de Janeiro, Brazil
- Died: 3 May 1992 (aged 77) Rio de Janeiro, Brazil

Sport
- Sport: Sports shooting

Silvino Ferreira (1 February 1915 – 3 May 1992) was a Brazilian sports shooter. He competed in the 50 m pistol event at the 1948 Summer Olympics.
