= Wenceslao Salgado =

Peruvian sports shooter (1900–1980)

Personal information
- Born: 28 April 1900 Lima, Peru
- Died: 29 July 1980 (aged 80)

Sport
- Sport: Sports shooting

Wenceslao Salgado (28 April 1900 – 29 July 1980) was a Peruvian sports shooter. He competed in the 50 m pistol event at the 1948 Summer Olympics. Salgado won a bronze medal in the 1951 Pan American Games 50 metres pistol team competition.
