= Trygve Andersen =

Norwegian wrestler (1909–1985)

Trygve Byman (Andersen)
Personal information
- Born: 27 August 1909 Ski, Norway
- Died: 13 November 1985 (aged 76)

Sport
- Sport: Wrestling
Medal record
Men's wrestling
Representing Norway
World Championships
Bronze medal – third place	1950 Stockholm	Light heavyweight

Trygve Byman (Andersen) (27 August 1909 – 13 November 1985) was a Norwegian sport wrestler. He was born in Gjedsjø in Ski and changed his name to Byman later in life. He won a bronze medal in Greco-Roman wrestling at the 1950 World Wrestling Championships.
