= César Injoque =

Peruvian sports shooter (1898–1970)

César Augusto Injoque Hurts
Personal information
- Born: 10 November 1898 Lima, Peru
- Died: 10 September 1970 (aged 71) Lima, Peru

Sport
- Sport: Sports shooting

César Injoque (10 November 1898 – 10 September 1970) was a Peruvian sports shooter. He competed in the 50 m pistol event at the 1948 Summer Olympics.
