= Felipe Verdú =

Spanish boxer

Personal information
- Nationality: Spanish
- Born: 13 February 1928; Alicante, Spain
- Died: 16 March 2002 (aged 74); Alicante, Spain

Sport
- Sport: Boxing

Felipe Verdú (13 February 1928 – 16 March 2002) was a Spanish boxer. He competed in the men's featherweight event at the 1948 Summer Olympics.
