= Edgard Delannoit =

Belgian boxer

Personal information
- Nationality: Belgian
- Born: 25 November 1929; Geraardsbergen, Belgium
- Died: 1993 (aged 63–64)

Sport
- Sport: Boxing

Edgard Delannoit (25 November 1929 – 1993) was a Belgian boxer. He competed in the men's featherweight event at the 1948 Summer Olympics.
