= Godofredo Basso =

Cuban sports shooter

Personal information
- Born: 8 November 1901 Trinidad, Cuba

Sport
- Sport: Sports shooting

Godofredo Basso (born 8 November 1901, date of death unknown) was a Cuban sports shooter. He competed in the 50 m pistol event at the 1948 Summer Olympics.
