= Ibrahim Orabi =

Egyptian Greco-Roman wrestler

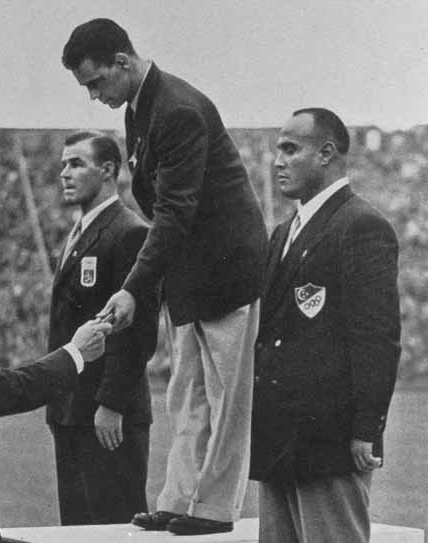
- Orabi (right) at the 1948 Olympics

Personal information
- Born: 1912 Alexandria, Egypt
- Died: 2 July 1957 (aged 44–45) Alexandria, Egypt

Sport
- Sport: Greco-Roman wrestling
Medal record
Men's Greco-Roman wrestling
Representing Egypt
Olympic Games
Bronze medal – third place	1948 London	Light heavyweight
Mediterranean Games
Silver medal – second place	1951 Alexandia	Light heavyweight

Ibrahim Orabi (Egyptian Arabic: ابراهيم عرابى; 1912 – 2 July 1957) was an Egyptian Greco-Roman wrestler. He competed as a middleweight at the 1936 Summer Olympics and as a light-heavyweight at the 1948 Games and finished in fifth and third place, respectively. Orabi finished in second place in the Mediterranean Games which held at Alexandia in 1951.
