= Benoy Bose (boxer) =

Indian boxer

Personal information
- Full name: Benoy Kumar Bose
- Nationality: Indian
- Born: 25 November 1929

Sport
- Sport: Boxing

Benoy Bose (born 25 November 1929) is an Indian boxer. He competed at the 1948 Summer Olympics and the 1952 Summer Olympics. In his first fight at the 1948 Summer Olympics, he lost to Francisco Núñez of Argentina.
