= John Gallie =

British sports shooter

Personal information
- Born: 26 November 1899 Tomich, Scotland
- Died: 9 December 1949 (aged 50) Ely, Cambridgeshire, England

Sport
- Sport: Sports shooting

John Gallie (26 November 1899 – 9 December 1949) was a British sports shooter. He competed in the 50 m pistol event at the 1948 Summer Olympics.
