= German Heavyweight Championship =

Catch Wrestling Association championships

Details
- Promotion: NWA Germany (1937–1950s); VoRo Agentur (1992); Catch Wrestling Association (1998–1999)
- Date established: July 15, 1937

Other name(s)
- VoRo German Heavyweight Championship (1992); CWA German Championship (1998–1999)
Statistics
- First champion(s): Hans Schmeling
- Final champion(s): Christian Eckstein

The German Heavyweight Championship is a professional wrestling championship defended exclusively in Germany. The title has been claimed by various German independent promotions throughout the years. The first version was established in 1937 and since then many promotions have created their own versions of the German Heavyweight Championship.

== Title histories ==
=== Names ===
Name	Years
German Heavyweight Championship	1930s–1950s
VoRo German Heavyweight Championship	April 4, 1992–October 7, 1992
CWA German Championship	October 10, 1998–December 4, 1999

Key

Symbol	Meaning
No.	The overall championship reign
Reign	The reign number for the specific wrestler listed.
Event	The event in which the championship changed hands
N/A	The specific information is not known
—	Used for vacated reigns in order to not count it as an official reign
[Note #]	Indicates that the exact length of the title reign is unknown, with a note providing more details.

=== Original version ===
The original version of the German Heavyweight Championship was created on July 15, 1937, when Hans Schmeling was billed as the German Heavyweight Champion in United Kingdom and United States. Karl Krauser was later recognized as the champion.

#	Wrestler	Reign	Date	Days held	Location	Event	Notes
1	Hans Schmeling	1	July 15, 1937	(Note: The length of the championship is too uncertain to calculate.)	(Note: The location of the match was not captured as part of the documentation.)	Live event	Schmeling was billed as the German Heavyweight Champion in United Kingdom and probably United States.
—	Vacated	—	—			—	—
2	Karl Krauser	1	c. 1950s	—			
—	Vacated	—	(Note: There is no documentation of the date when Karl Krauser vacated the title.)	—	—	—	—

=== VoRo Agentor version (1992) ===
VoRo Agentor recognized a version of the German Heavyweight Championship in 1992, which the promotion called VoRo German Heavyweight Championship.

#	Wrestler	Reign	Date	Days held	Location	Event	Notes
1	Ulf Ranger	1	April 4, 1992	186	Karlsruhe, Germany	Live event	Defeated Buffalo Breheny to win the vacant title.
—	Vacated	—	October 7, 1992	—	Bremerhaven, Bremen, Germany	Live event	The title was defended for the last time at the event as VoRo closed after the event.

=== Catch Wrestling Association version (1998–1999) ===
Catch Wrestling Association created its own version of the German Heavyweight Championship at the Champions Night event in the Catch World Cup tour on October 10, 1998. They named it the "CWA German Championship". The championship was contested under 10 three-minute rounds.

#	Wrestler	Reign	Date	Days held	Location	Event	Notes
1	Christian Eckstein	1	October 10, 1998	420	Hanover, Germany	Catch World Cup	Defeated Eddy Steinblock to win the vacant title.
—	Vacated	—	December 4, 1999	—	Bremen, Germany	Euro Catch Festival	CWA closed after the event, thus vacating the title.
