= Antonios Gryllos =

Greek wrestler (1917–1993)

Personal information
- Nationality: Greek
- Born: 1917
- Died: 1993 (aged 75–76)

Sport
- Sport: Wrestling

Antonios Gryllos (1917–1993) was a Greek wrestler. He competed in the men's Greco-Roman featherweight at the 1948 Summer Olympics.
