= Laurie Birks =

Australian boxer (1928–2021)

Personal information
- Full name: Laurence Sydney Birks
- Born: 7 January 1928 Bundaberg, Queensland, Australia
- Died: 10 July 2021 (aged 93) Gold Coast, Queensland, Australia

Sport
- Sport: Boxing

Laurence Sydney Birks (7 January 1928 – 10 July 2021) was an Australian boxer. He competed in the men's featherweight event at the 1948 Summer Olympics.

Birks married Elaine Rose Parry, a member of the Queensland cricket team, in Bundaberg on 21 October 1950.

Birks died in Gold Coast, Queensland on 10 July 2021, at the age of 93.
