= Manuel Videla =

Chilean boxer (1920–1993)

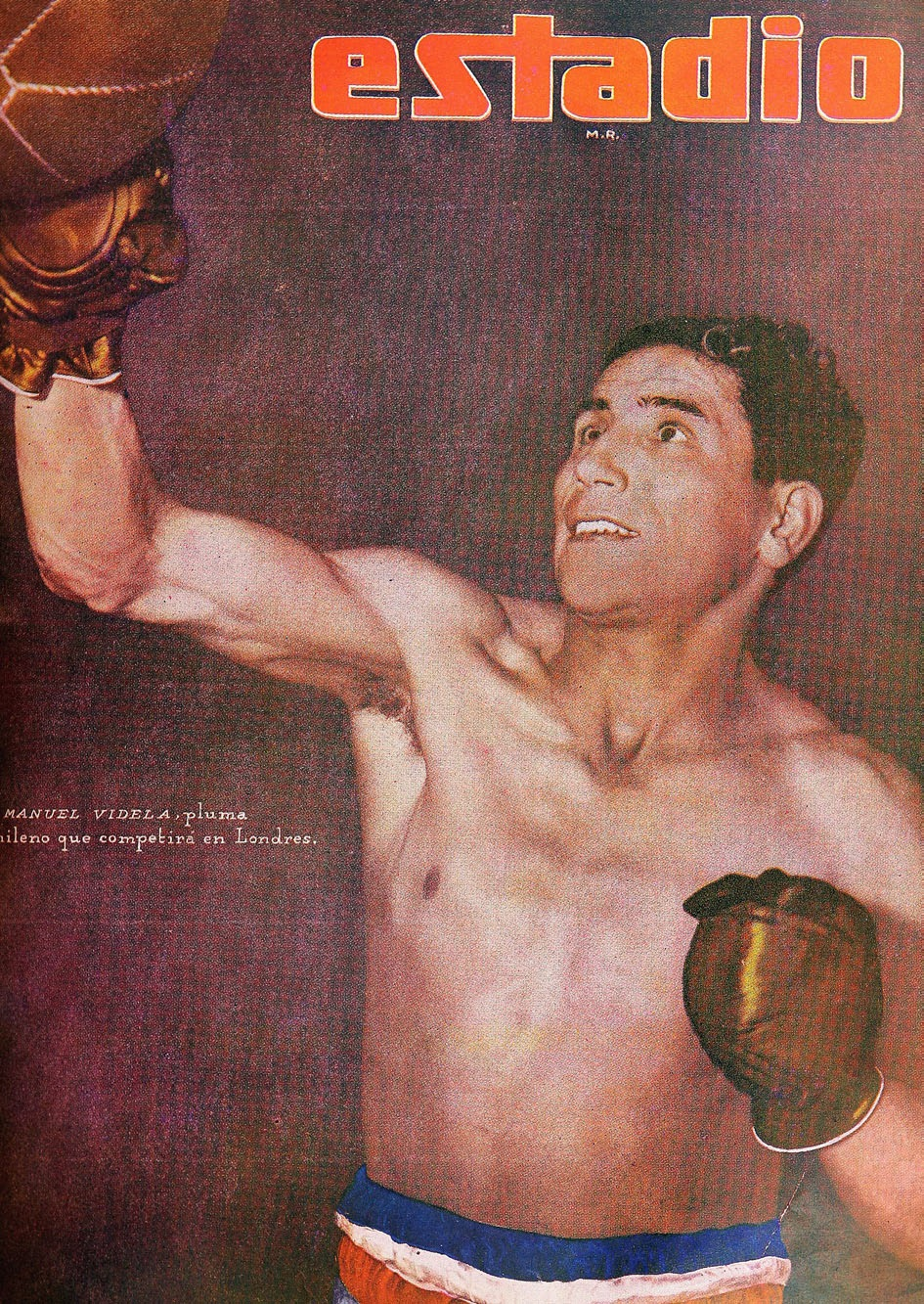

Personal information
- Full name: Manuel Arturo Videla Castillo
- Nationality: Chilean
- Born: 1920 Valparaíso, Chile
- Died: July 23, 1993 (aged 72–73) Valparaíso, Chile

Sport
- Sport: Boxing

Manuel Videla (1920 – July 23, 1993) was a Chilean boxer. He competed in the men's featherweight event at the 1948 Summer Olympics. At the 1948 Summer Olympics, he defeated Michel Ghaoui of Lebanon before losing to Francisco Núñez of Argentina.
