= Peter Enzinger =

Austrian wrestler

Personal information
- Nationality: Austrian
- Born: 23 January 1916
- Died: 3 October 1976 (aged 60)

Sport
- Sport: Wrestling

Peter Enzinger (23 January 1916 – 3 October 1976) was an Austrian wrestler. He competed in the men's Greco-Roman light heavyweight at the 1948 Summer Olympics.
