= Matti Tammelin =

Finnish boxer

Personal information
- Nationality: Finnish
- Born: 6 September 1926; Helsinki, Finland
- Died: 16 February 1998 (aged 71); Turku, Finland

Sport
- Sport: Boxing

Matti Tammelin (6 September 1926 – 16 February 1998) was a Finnish boxer. He competed in the men's featherweight event at the 1948 Summer Olympics.
