= Guy Granet (sport shooter) =

British sports shooter

Personal information
- Born: 21 September 1887 Ipswich, England
- Died: 20 November 1953 (aged 66) Sudbury, Suffolk, England

Sport
- Sport: Sports shooting

Guy Granet (21 September 1887 – 20 November 1953) was a British sports shooter. He competed in the 50 m pistol event at the 1948 Summer Olympics.
