= Lars Berg (sport shooter) =

Swedish sports shooter

Personal information
- Born: 4 June 1916 Gothenburg, Sweden
- Died: 24 June 1988 (aged 72) Enköping, Sweden

Sport
- Sport: Sports shooting

Lars Berg (4 June 1916 – 24 June 1988) was a Swedish sports shooter. He competed in the 50 m pistol event at the 1948 Summer Olympics.
