= Quentin Brooks =

American sports shooter

Personal information
- Full name: Quentin Thomas Brooks
- Born: September 4, 1920 McAlester, Oklahoma, United States
- Died: May 7, 2007 (aged 86) Richardson, Texas, United States

Sport
- Sport: Sports shooting

Quentin Thomas Brooks (September 4, 1920 – May 7, 2007) was an American sports shooter. He competed in the 50 m pistol event at the 1948 Summer Olympics.

== Personal life ==
Brooks served in the United States Army during World War II.
