= Ibrahim Mahgoub =

Lebanese wrestler (1921–1980)

Personal information
- Nationality: Lebanese
- Born: 1921
- Died: June 1980 (aged 58–59)

Sport
- Sport: Wrestling

Ibrahim Mahgoub (1921 – June 1980) was a Lebanese wrestler. He competed in the men's Greco-Roman light heavyweight at the 1948 Summer Olympics. Mahgoub died in June 1980.
