= Edwin Vásquez =

Peruvian sport shooter (1922–1993)

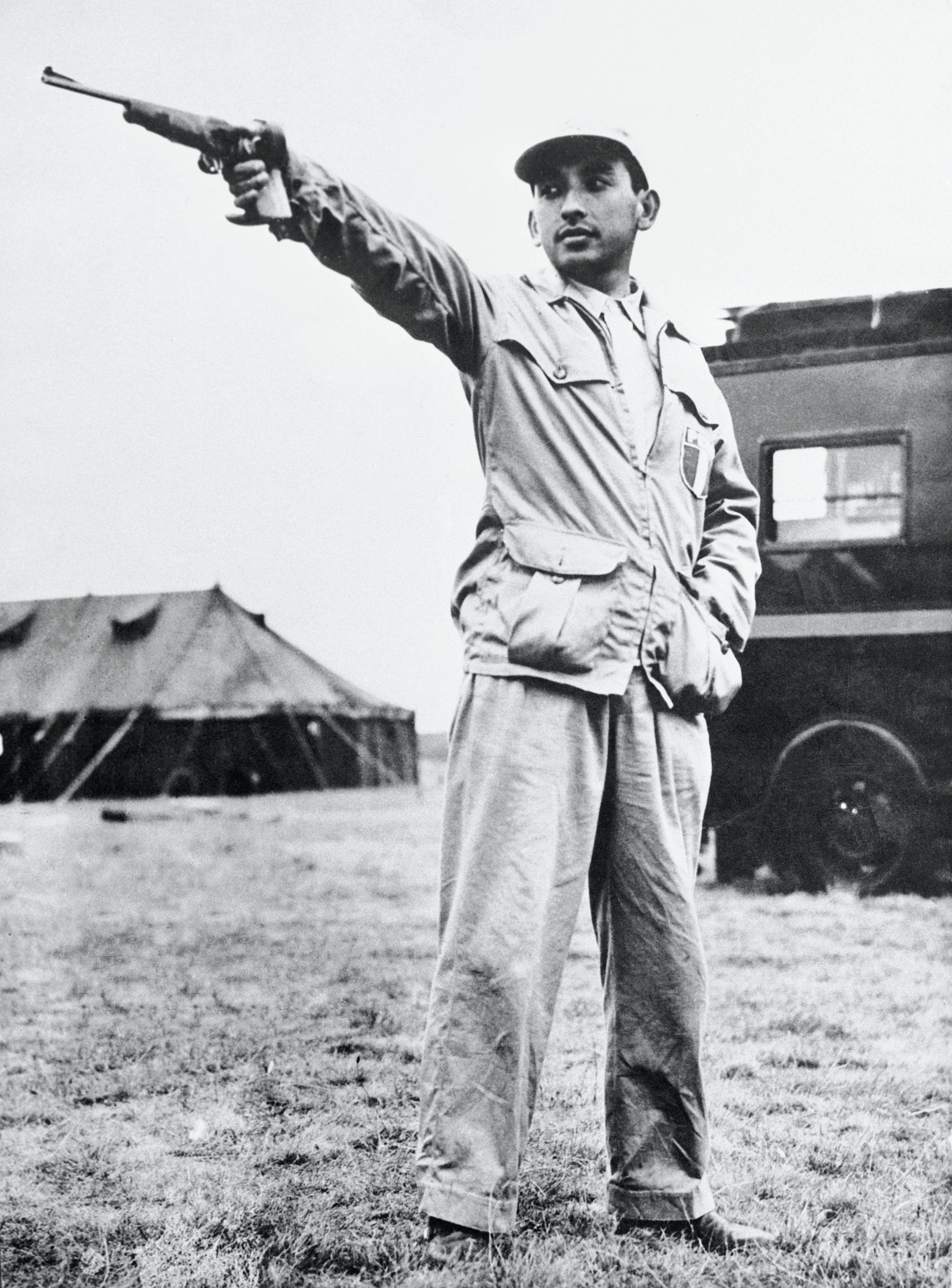
- Vásquez at the 1948 Summer Olympics

Personal information
- Full name: Edwin Gonzalo Vásquez Cam
- Born: 28 July 1922 Lobitos, Peru
- Died: 9 March 1993 (aged 70)

Sport
- Sport: Sports shooting
Medal record
Men's shooting
Representing Peru
Olympic Games
Gold medal – first place	1948 London	50 m pistol

Edwin Gonzalo Vásquez Cam (28 July 1922 – 9 March 1993) was an Olympic sport shooter from Peru. He won a gold medal in the 50 m pistol event at the 1948 Summer Olympics, winning Peru's first and only Olympic gold medal to date. Vásquez also won the free pistol event at the 1951 Pan American Games, while placing third in the team pistol event.
