= Heinz Ambühl =

Swiss sports shooter (1905–1992)

Personal information
- Born: Heinrich Ambühl; 15 June 1905 Zell, Switzerland
- Died: 18 September 1992 (aged 87)

Sport
- Sport: Sports shooting

Heinz Ambühl (15 June 1905 – 18 September 1992) was a Swiss sports shooter. He competed in the 50 m pistol event at the 1948 Summer Olympics.
