= Albin Dannacher =

Swiss wrestler (18.6.1913–1993)

Personal information
- Nationality: Swiss
- Born: 1913 Therwil, Switzerland
- Died: 1993 (aged 79–80) Ettingen, Switzerland

Sport
- Sport: Wrestling

Albin Dannacher (1913–1993) was a Swiss wrestler. He competed in the men's Greco-Roman light heavyweight at the 1948 Summer Olympics.
