= Michel Ghaoui =

Lebanese boxer

Personal information
- Nationality: Lebanese
- Born: c. 1929

Sport
- Sport: Boxing

Michel Ghaoui (Arabic: ميشال غاوي, born c. 1929) was a Lebanese boxer. He started boxing when he was 15 years old, starting a boxing gym, Le Club de Liban, in 1944 and winning the national title in the bantamweight division in 1947. He competed in the men's featherweight event at the 1948 Summer Olympics. At the 1948 Summer Olympics, he lost to Manuel Vidella of Chile in the first round.
