= Georgios Stathis =

Greek sports shooter

Personal information
- Born: 1906

Sport
- Sport: Sports shooting

Georgios Stathis (born 1906, date of death unknown) was a Greek sports shooter. He competed at the 1936, 1948 and 1952 Summer Olympics.
