= Eddie Johnson (boxer) =

American boxer (1927–1986)

Personal information
- Full name: Edward Roger Johnson
- Born: December 12, 1927 Longview, Texas, U.S.
- Died: October 9, 1986 (aged 58) Kansas, U.S.

Sport
- Sport: Boxing

Edward Roger Johnson (December 12, 1927 – October 9, 1986) was an American boxer. He competed in the men's featherweight event at the 1948 Summer Olympics. Johnson died in Kansas on October 9, 1986, at the age of 58.
