= Su Bung-nan =

Korean male boxer (born 1922)

Seo Byeong-ran
Personal information
- Nationality: South Korean
- Born: 26 February 1922

Sport
- Sport: Boxing

Seo Byeong-ran (Korean: 서병란, born 26 February 1922) was a South Korean boxer. He competed at the 1948 Summer Olympics and the 1952 Summer Olympics.
