= Svend Aage Sørensen =

Danish boxer (1926–2002)

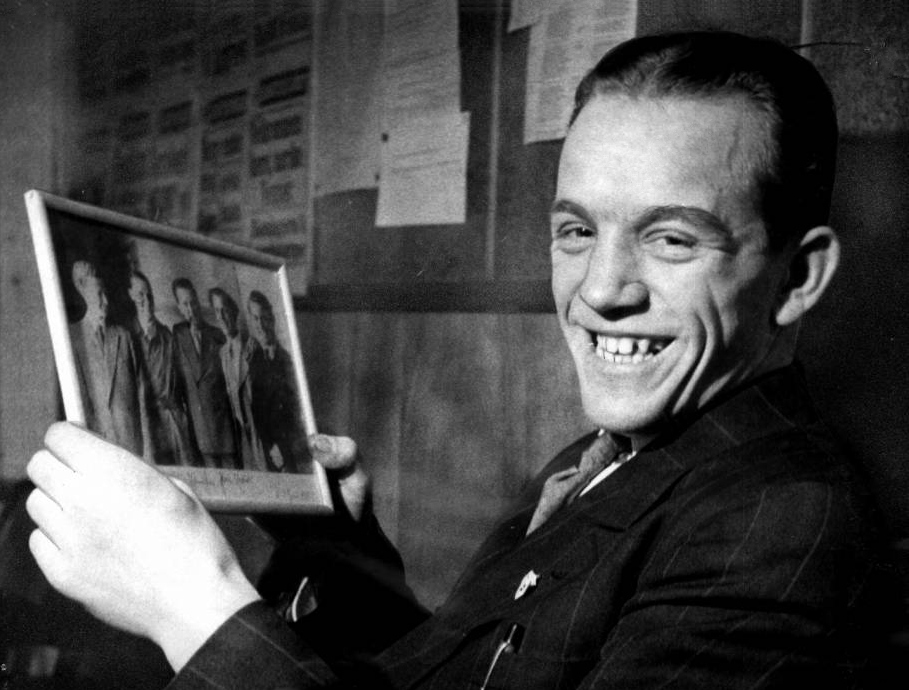
- Svend Aage Sørensen in 1947

Personal information
- Born: 3 August 1926 Øster Hassing, Aalborg, Denmark
- Died: 27 September 2002 (aged 76) Aalborg, Denmark

Sport
- Sport: Boxing
- Club: IK Sparta, Aalborg

Svend Aage Rye Sørensen (3 August 1926 – 27 September 2002) was an amateur Danish featherweight boxer. He competed in the 1948 Summer Olympics, but was eliminated in the first bout.
