= Walpersberg =

Mountain in Thuringia, Germany

- Walpurgis Mountain
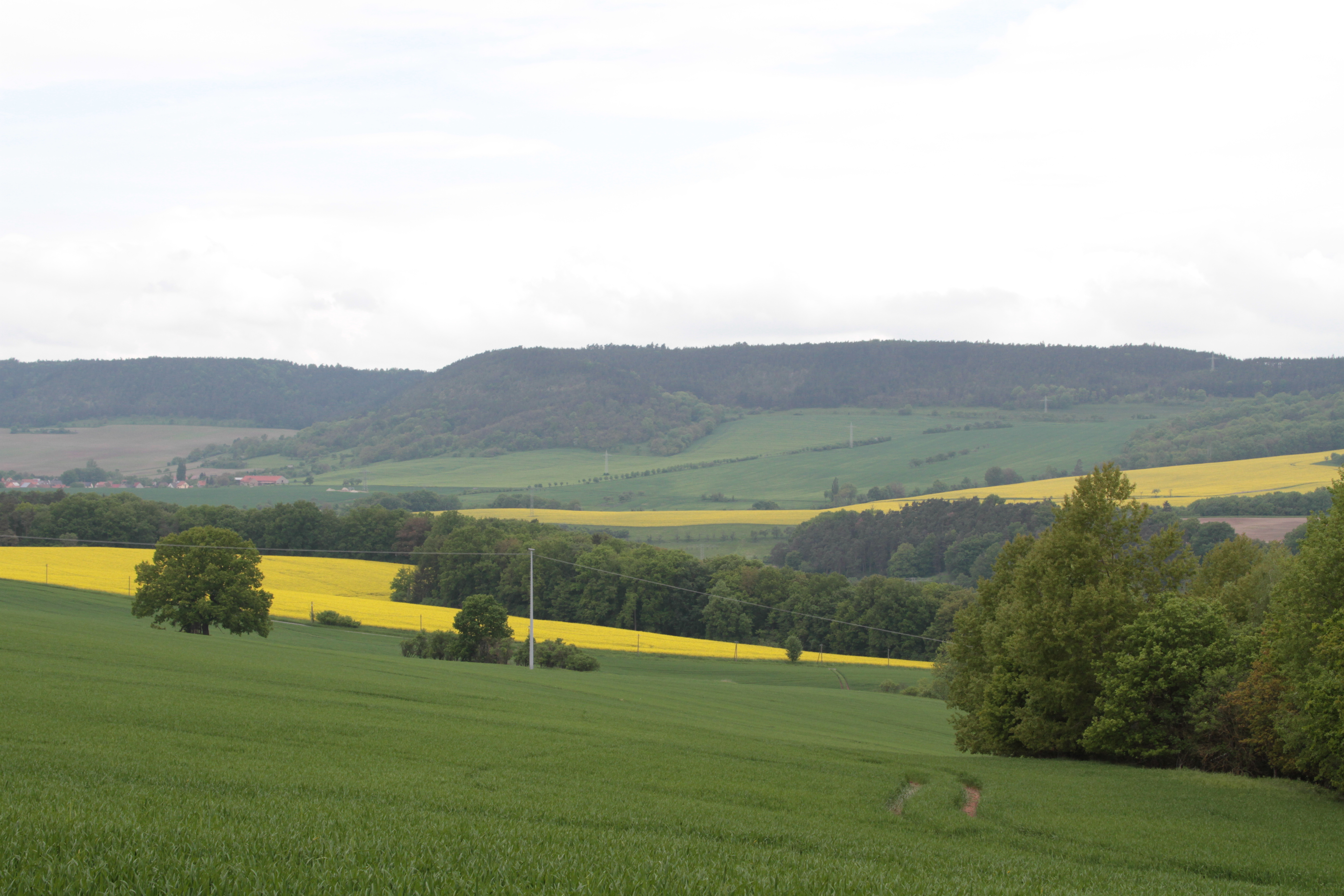

Highest point
- Elevation: 320 m (1,050 ft)
- Coordinates: 50°47′45″N 11°33′24″E

Geography
- Location: Thuringia, Germany

The Walpersberg is a sandstone mesa on the west bank of the Saale near Kahla in Thuringia, Germany, formed around 60 million years ago. It is notable for formerly housing the REIMAHG-A aircraft factory, an underground facility for the production and assembly of the Messerschmitt Me 262 fighter jet during World War II.

== History ==
=== Early history ===
The Walpersberg was referred to until the 15th century as Walpurgis Mountain. There is some evidence of ancient settlements in the surrounding Saale Valley, dating from the Middle Palaeolithic period.

Since the Middle Ages, three quarries on the Walpersberg have provided sandstone for local communities, often used as foundation material for houses. Evidence of these quarries can still be seen today. On the southern slope of the Walpersberg, buildings and artificial terraces were built for growing grapes for the purposes of wine production, although production declined in the 17th century.

A trade route ran over the mountain, known as "Green Street". From the 18th century the route became known as the "Gothic Street", due to the fact that it was a connection road to the Castle Friedensstein in Gotha.

By the late 19th century there was a thriving porcelain industry in nearby Kahla, and sand containing kaolin (a constituent material of porcelain) was found at the Walpersberg. Excavation began in 1897 by Kahlaer Porzellanwerke AG, creating a tunnel system extending 20 km.

=== Use during World War II ===
In 1944, a construction project was commenced by Nazi Germany to convert the former sand mines at the Walpersberg to a bomb-proof underground factory for the production of the Messerschmitt Me 262. To achieve this, the existing tunnel system was extended to 30 km by the use of over 12,000 forced labourers from Italy and Eastern Europe, and a further 3,000 skilled workers. Conversion of the former sand mines into the aircraft factory led to construction of a runway at the top of the Walpersberg. An inclined railway built into the side of the hill was used to move the aircraft from the ground level tunnel exit up to the runway, and the first Me 262 took off on 21 February 1945. Eventually only around 20 or 30 completed aircraft left the facility before it was liberated by US troops on 12–13 April 1945.

=== Post-war use ===
Following destruction of much of the structure by the Soviets, the remaining galleries under the Walpersberg were used as storage space for a fruit and vegetable warehouse during the 1950s. Later, from the 1960s, a part of the Walpersberg mine system was used by VEB Geological Research West for the storage of core samples.

From 1974 until 1989, the Walpersberg was part of East Germany's Department of Defence storage complex KL-22, with ammunition, weapons, and other military supplies being stored there. The Bundeswehr later used the property until 1997, at which point high operating costs necessitated closure of the facility.

Every year, around 8 May, ceremonies take place in the communities surrounding the Walpersberg to commemorate the 2,000 forced labourers who died at the Walpersberg. It is a tradition that former forced labourers of REIMAHG from abroad attend these ceremonies.

Two permanent museum sites present the history of the underground armaments factory “REIMAHG”: an exhibition at the Kahla Town Museum and the Documentation Center of the Geschichts- und Forschungsverein Walpersberg e. V. in Großeutersdorf. Both museums address the construction and function of the underground factory, the system of camps, forced labor, and the liberation in 1945 by the U.S. Army.

In addition, the association offers regular guided tours at the historical sites on and around the Walpersberg. Up-to-date information on guided tours and dates is provided online.
