= Kaare Gundersen =

Norwegian boxer

Personal information
- Nationality: Norwegian
- Born: 13 August 1909 Oslo, Norway
- Died: 13 February 1971 (aged 61) Oslo, Norway

Sport
- Sport: Boxing

Kaare Gundersen (13 August 1909 – 13 February 1971) was a Norwegian boxer. He competed in the men's featherweight event at the 1948 Summer Olympics.
