= Peter Marchant (sport shooter) =

British sports shooter

Personal information
- Born: 13 December 1920 Ashford, Kent, England
- Died: 12 September 1977 (aged 56) Johannesburg, South Africa

Sport
- Sport: Sports shooting

Peter Marchant (31 December 1920 – 12 September 1977) was a British sports shooter. He competed in the 50 m pistol event at the 1948 Summer Olympics.

Marchant was educated at Sutton Valence School.
