= Mehmet Oktav =

Turkish wrestler (1917–1996)

Medal record

Men's Greco-Roman wrestling

Representing Turkey

Olympic Games
Gold medal – first place	1948 London	62 kg

Mehmet Oktav (1917 – 6 April 1996) was a Turkish sports wrestler, who became Olympic gold medalist for Turkey in the Featherweight class of Men's Greco-Roman Wrestling in 1948.

== Biography ==
Oktav was born in Istanbul, Ottoman Empire in 1917. He began his sports career as a football player in 1942, switched over, however, to wrestling afterwards. He won the gold medal in the 1948 Olympics in 62 kg class as the second Turkish wrestler after Yaşar Erkan. Before retiring in 1953, he competed 13 times in the national team. Mehmet Oktav served then in some sports clubs and in the national team 17 years long as a trainer.
