= Enrique Tejeda =

Cuban sports shooter

Personal information
- Full name: Enrique Luis Tejeda Canete
- Born: 1 May 1905

Sport
- Sport: Sports shooting

Enrique Tejeda (born 1 May 1905, date of death unknown) was a Cuban sports shooter. He competed in the 50 m pistol event at the 1948 Summer Olympics.
