= Omar Blebel =

Argentine wrestler (1922–2002)

Personal information
- Born: 4 March 1922 Rosario, Argentina
- Died: 1 December 2002 (aged 80) Pasadena, California, United States

Sport
- Sport: Wrestling

Omar Blebel (4 March 1922 – 1 December 2002) was an Argentine wrestler. He competed at the 1948 Summer Olympics and the 1952 Summer Olympics.

== Achievement ==
Omar Blebel achieved gold medal victories in the freestyle featherweight -62 kg category at both the 1951 and 1955 Pan American Games.
