= Erkki Talosela =

Finnish wrestler (1921–2010)

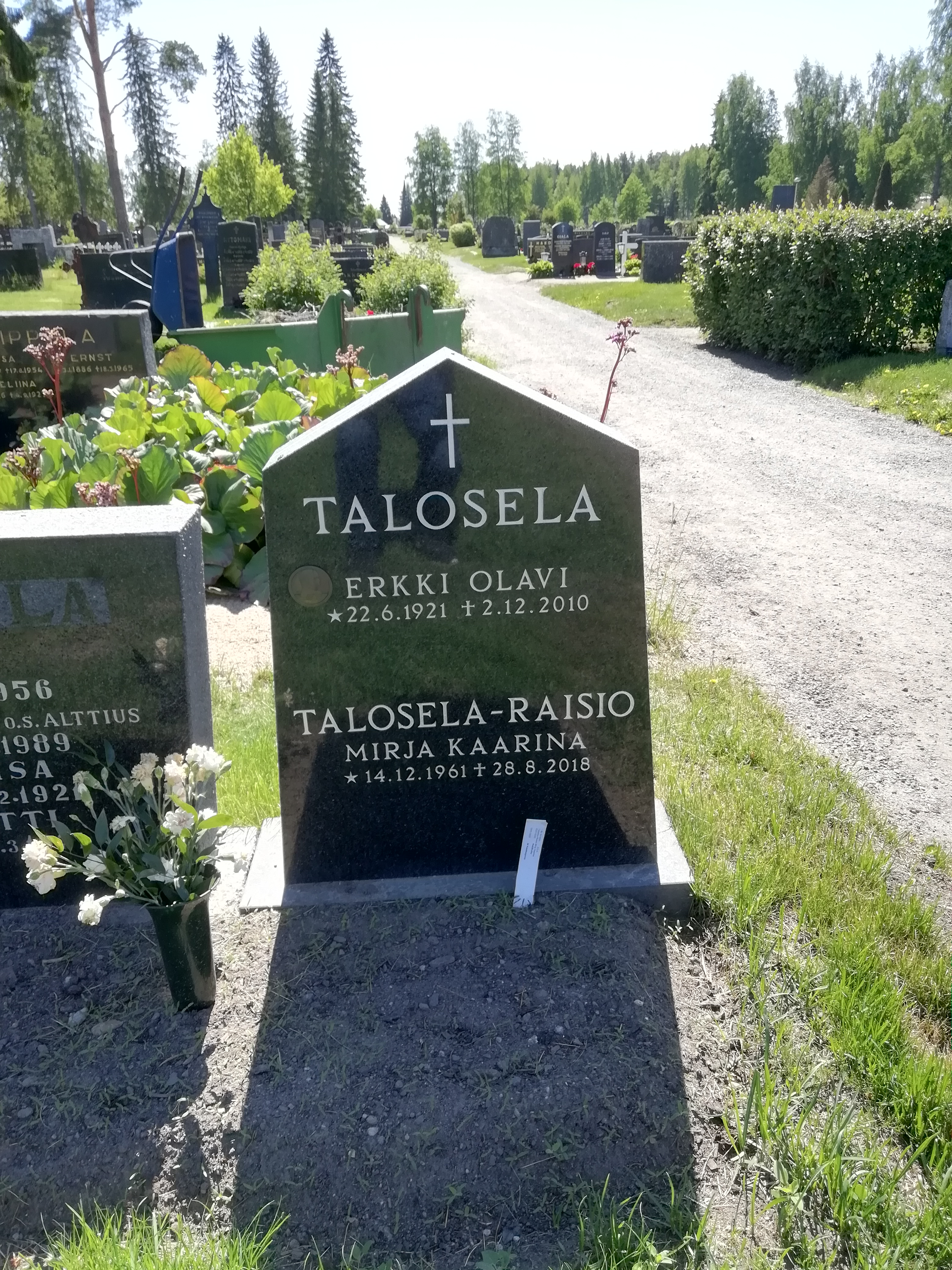
- Talosela's gravestone

Personal information
- Full name: Erkki Olavi Talosela
- Nationality: Finnish
- Born: 22 June 1921 Lapua, Finland
- Died: 2 December 2010 (aged 89)
- Height: 168 cm (5 ft 6 in)

Sport
- Sport: Wrestling

Erkki Talosela (22 June 1921 – 2 December 2010) was a Finnish wrestler. He competed at the 1948 Summer Olympics and the 1952 Summer Olympics.
