= Olle Anderberg =

Swedish wrestler (1919–2003)

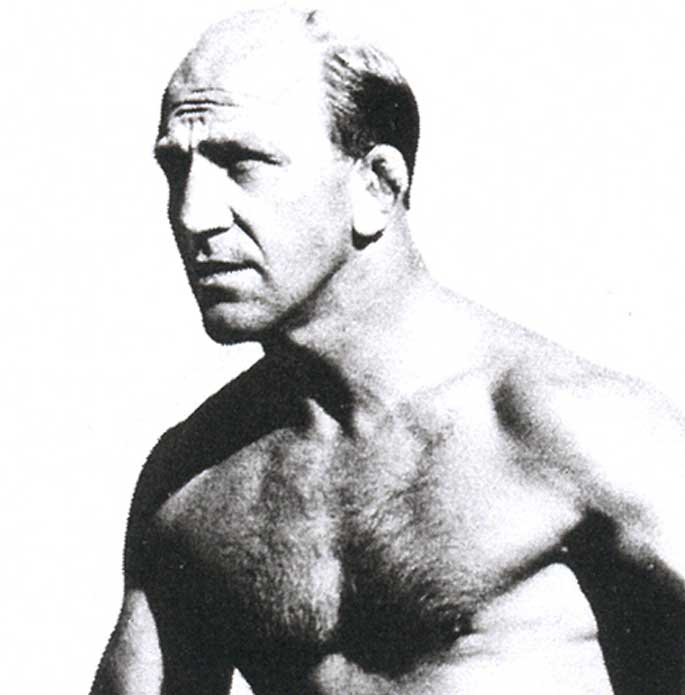

Personal information
- Born: 13 September 1919 Asmundtorp, Sweden
- Died: 26 September 2003 (aged 84) Linköping, Sweden

Sport
- Sport: Wrestling
- Club: Eskilstuna GAK, Eskilstuna; Örgryte IS, Göteborg
Medal record
Representing Sweden
Olympic Games
Gold medal – first place	1952 Helsinki	Freestyle 67 kg
Silver medal – second place	1948 London	Greco-Roman 62 kg
World Championships
Gold medal – first place	1950 Stockholm	Greco-Roman 62 kg
Gold medal – first place	1951 Helsinki	Freestyle 67 kg
Gold medal – first place	1953 Naples	Greco-Roman 62 kg
Silver medal – second place	1954 Tokyo	Freestyle 67 kg
European Championships
Gold medal – first place	1947 Prague	Greco-Roman 62 kg
Gold medal – first place	1949 Istanbul	Freestyle 62 kg
Silver medal – second place	1946 Stockholm	Freestyle 62 kg

Olle Henrik Martin Anderberg (13 September 1919 – 26 September 2003) was a Swedish wrestler. He competed in the 1948, 1952 and 1956 Summer Olympics in freestyle and Greco-Roman events and won a silver medal in the Greco-Roman featherweight in 1948 and a gold in the freestyle lightweight in 1952. Between 1942 and 1962 Anderberg won three world, two European and 27 national titles.

Anderberg's father Frans and brother Gunnar played football in the Swedish premier division. Olle tried football too, but had a much better career in wrestling, both as a competitor and a coach. He worked with the national teams of Finland, Turkey and Iran (1957–1960), and was personally known to Mohammad Reza Pahlavi.
