= Luigi Campanella =

Italian wrestler (1918–2018)

Personal information
- Nationality: Italian
- Born: 8 November 1918 Genoa, Italy
- Died: 5 June 2018 (aged 99) Genoa, Italy

Sport
- Sport: Wrestling

Luigi Campanella (8 November 1918 – 5 June 2018) was an Italian wrestler. He competed in the men's Greco-Roman featherweight at the 1948 Summer Olympics.
