= Béla Farkas =

Hungarian boxer

Personal information
- Nationality: Hungarian
- Born: 10 December 1928; Komárom, Hungary

Sport
- Sport: Boxing

Béla Farkas (born 10 December 1928) is a Hungarian boxer. He competed at the 1948 Summer Olympics and the 1952 Summer Olympics.
