= Michael Ambühl =

Swiss university teacher

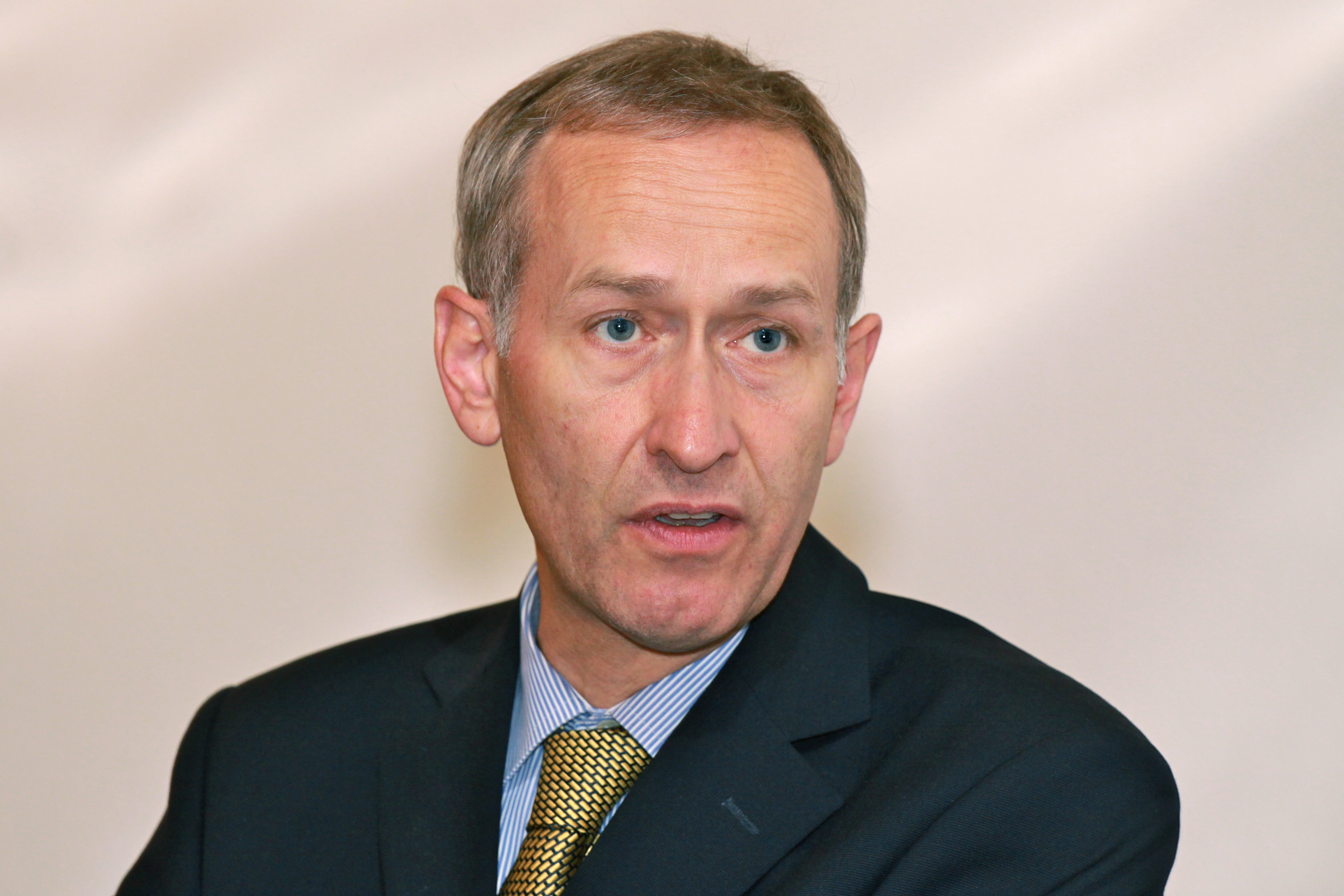
Ambühl in 2009

Michael Ambühl (born 26 September 1951) is the former Swiss state secretary for foreign affairs. He was Head of Chair of Negotiation and Conflict Management at the Department of Management, Technology, and Economics of ETH Zurich (Swiss Federal Institute of Technology Zurich). In 2018/19, he was Head of this Department (Faculty).

Ambühl was born and raised in Bern, Switzerland. He studied applied mathematics and business administration at the ETH Zurich, where he finished his studies as Doctor sc. techn. ETH with a thesis entitled Zur Parameterwahl in einem Strafkostenverfahren in 1980. Already at that time, he was interested in game theory. He became a lecturer at the Economics Faculty of the University of Zurich.

In 1982, he joined the diplomatic services of Switzerland. Postings included work at different ministries in Bern, at the Swiss Embassies in Kinshasa (1983/84), in New Delhi (1988-1992) and the Swiss Mission to the European Union (EU) in Brussels (1992-1999). Ambühl was promoted to the rank of Ambassador in 1999. From 2001 until 2004, he was Swiss chief negotiator for the Bilateral Agreements II between Switzerland and the EU. As State Secretary of the Foreign Ministry from 2005 onwards, he was leading several negotiations. In 2010, he transferred from the Foreign Ministry to the Finance Ministry and had to negotiate tax agreements and resolve disputes with the US over Swiss banking.

In 2013, Ambühl became full professor of negotiation and conflict management at the ETH Zurich, a newly created position. In this new function, he focused on the theoretical background of negotiation engineering, different technical and applied negotiation schools of thought, mediation and conflict management. He held lectures on these topics at many universities worldwide, including at Stanford University, MIT, Columbia University and New York University in the United States, Chongqing University, Tsinghua University and Nanjing University in China, Boğaziçi University in Istanbul, and at multiple European and British research institutes.

In the ongoing negotiations between Switzerland and the EU, Ambühl and his postdoc Daniela Scherer at the ETH Zurich analyzed the situation and made proposals that were influential in Swiss politics.

The ETH established, on initiative of Ambühl, the ETH Swiss School of Public Governance (SSPG) and he acted as its first director. This new organization aims to provide additional academic education to public administrators and new members of the Swiss parliament.

He proposed also a cooperation of the ETH Zurich with the University of Geneva in the new field of Science in Diplomacy.

After retiring from his position at the ETH Zurich, he gave a final lecture in October 2022. He did not only review his work at the ETH during the past nine years but also offered advice to solve actual conflicts. In particular, he discussed how the Russian invasion of Ukraine needs to be terminated by negotiations.

== Honors ==
- Permanent Guest of Honor at the University of Zurich
- Honorary Visiting Professor at the Chongqing University of Posts & Telecommunications, China
- 2016: Golden Owl, Teaching Award by Student Association VSETH
