= Athanasios Kambaflis =

Greek wrestler (1915–1993)

Personal information
- Nationality: Greek
- Born: 1915 Delphi, Kingdom of Greece
- Died: 1993 (aged 77–78) Vironos, Greece

Sport
- Sport: Wrestling

Athanasios Kampaflis (1915–1993) was a Greek wrestler. He competed in the men's Greco-Roman light heavyweight at the 1948 Summer Olympics.

Kampaflis was born in 1915. He died in Vironos in 1993.
