= Gyula Kovács (wrestler) =

Hungarian wrestler (1917–1986)

Personal information
- Nationality: Hungarian
- Born: 28 August 1917 Homokmégy, Austria-Hungary
- Died: 11 October 1986 (aged 69) Budapest, Hungary

Sport
- Sport: Wrestling
Medal record
Representing the Hungarian People's Republic
Greco-Roman wrestling
World Cup
Bronze medal – third place	1956 Istanbul	-87 kg

Gyula Kovács (28 August 1917 – 11 October 1986) was a Hungarian wrestler. He competed at the 1948 Summer Olympics, the 1952 Summer Olympics and the 1956 Summer Olympics.
