= Egil Solsvik =

Norwegian wrestler

Personal information
- Born: 12 April 1916 Kristiania, Norway
- Died: 6 October 2005 (aged 89) Long Beach, California, United States

Sport
- Sport: Wrestling
- Club: IF Ørnulf

Egil Uno Solsvik (12 April 1916 – 6 October 2005) was a Norwegian wrestler. He was born in Kristiania, and represented the club IF Ørnulf. He competed in Greco-Roman wrestling at the 1948 Summer Olympics in London, where he placed sixth (shared) in his class. He won a bronze medal at the 1938 European championship. He died in California in 2005.
