= El-Sayed Kandil =

Egyptian wrestler (1917–2000)

El-Sayed Mohamed Kandil
Personal information
- Nationality: Egyptian
- Born: 1917 Cairo, Egypt
- Died: 28 January 2000 (aged 82)

Sport
- Sport: Wrestling

El-Sayed Mohamed Kandil (1917 – 28 January 2000) was an Egyptian wrestler. He competed in the men's Greco-Roman featherweight at the 1948 Summer Olympics.
