= Erling Stuer Lauridsen =

Danish wrestler (1916–2012)

Personal information
- Nationality: Danish
- Born: 27 November 1916 Kongens Lyngby, Denmark
- Died: 12 March 2012 (aged 95) Gentofte, Denmark

Sport
- Sport: Wrestling

Erling Stuer Lauridsen (27 November 1916 – 12 March 2012) was a Danish wrestler. He competed in the men's Greco-Roman light heavyweight at the 1948 Summer Olympics.
