= Georg Weidner =

Austrian wrestler

Personal information
- Nationality: Austrian
- Born: 14 January 1914 Groß-Zimmern, Germany
- Died: 6 March 1983 (aged 69) Graz, Austria

Sport
- Sport: Wrestling

Georg Weidner (14 January 1914 – 6 March 1983) was an Austrian wrestler. He competed in the men's Greco-Roman featherweight at the 1948 Summer Olympics.
