= Kevin Martin (boxer) =

Irish boxer

Personal information
- Nationality: Irish
- Born: 25 December 1925
- Died: 23 November 1983 (aged 57); Sydney, Australia

Sport
- Sport: Boxing

Kevin Martin (25 December 1925 – 23 November 1983) was an Irish boxer. He competed at the 1948 Summer Olympics and the 1952 Summer Olympics. He died in Sydney, Australia.
