= Adolfo Ramírez =

Argentine wrestler (born 1922)

Personal information
- Full name: Adolfo Ramírez Malla
- Born: 25 March 1922 Zárate, Buenos Aires, Argentina
- Died: before 2001

Sport
- Sport: Wrestling

Adolfo Ramírez Malla (25 March 1922 – before 2001) was an Argentine wrestler. He competed at the 1948 Summer Olympics and the 1952 Summer Olympics. Ramírez died prior to 2001.
