= Raymond Strasser =

Luxembourgish wrestler (1930–2019)

Personal information
- Nationality: Luxembourgish
- Born: 14 September 1930 Differdange, Luxembourg
- Died: 24 October 2019 (aged 89)

Sport
- Sport: Wrestling

Raymond Strasser (14 September 1930 – 24 October 2019) was a Luxembourgish wrestler. He competed in the men's Greco-Roman featherweight at the 1948 Summer Olympics. Strasser died on 24 October 2019, at the age of 89.
