= Khalil Hilmi =

Lebanese sports shooter (1909–2004)

Personal information
- Born: 1909 Beirut, Lebanon
- Died: 17 July 2004 (aged 94–95)

Sport
- Sport: Sports shooting

Khalil Hilmi (Arabic: خليل حلمي; 1909 – 17 July 2004) was a Lebanese sports shooter. He competed at the 1948 Summer Olympics and 1952 Summer Olympics.

In 1936, Hilmi founded Hilmi-Sport, a football club based in Beirut, Lebanon.
