= Antoine Merle =

French wrestler

Personal information
- Nationality: French
- Born: 22 March 1921
- Died: 30 April 2013 (aged 92)

Sport
- Sport: Wrestling

Antoine Merle (22 March 1921 – 30 April 2013) was a French wrestler. He competed at the 1948 Summer Olympics and the 1952 Summer Olympics.
