= Francisco Núñez (boxer) =

Argentine boxer (1924–1987)

Personal information
- Nationality: Argentine
- Born: 5 October 1924
- Died: 31 August 1987 (aged 62) La Plata, Argentina

Sport
- Sport: Boxing
Medal record
Men's amateur boxing
Representing Argentina
Pan American Games
Gold medal – first place	1951 Buenos Aires	Featherweight

Francisco Núñez (5 October 1924 – 31 August 1987) was an Argentine boxer. He competed at the 1948 Summer Olympics and the 1956 Summer Olympics.
