= Equestrian at the 1952 Summer Olympics – Team jumping =

Equestrian at the Olympics

Team jumping at the Games of the XV Olympiad
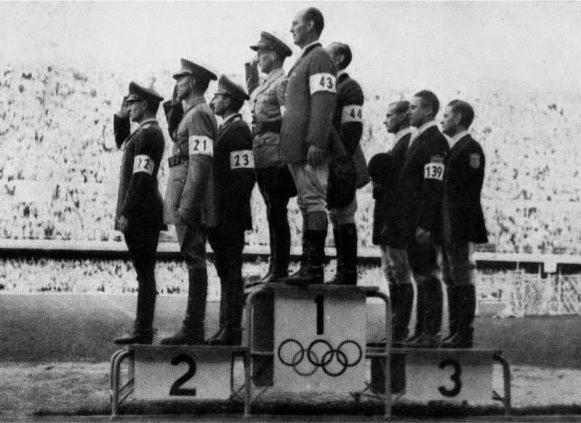
- Team podium
- Venue: Helsinki Olympic Stadium
- Date: 3 August 1956
- Competitors: 45 from 15 nations

Medalists
1st place, gold medalist(s)		Wilfred White; Douglas Stewart; Harry Llewellyn	Great Britain
2nd place, silver medalist(s)		Óscar Cristi; César Mendoza; Ricardo Echeverría	Chile
3rd place, bronze medalist(s)		William Steinkraus; Arthur McCashin; John Russell	United States

The team jumping or Prix des Nations at the 1952 Summer Olympics took place on 3 August, at the Helsinki Olympic Stadium. It was the eighth appearance of the event. For the first time, the event featured two rounds.

== Competition format ==
The team and individual jumping competitions used the same results. The course was 786 metres long with 13 obstacles. The time limit was 1 minute, 57.2 seconds (400 m/min). Penalty points were received for obstacle faults (3, 4, 6, or 8 points based on severity) or exceeding the time limit (0.25 points per second or fraction thereof over the limit). A third refusal or jumping an obstacle out of order resulted in elimination. Scores from the two runs were added together for a total individual score. The scores from the three team members were added to give a team score.

== Results ==
Rank	Nation	Individual results					Round 1	Round 2	Total
Rank	Nation	Rider	Horse	Round 1	Round 2	Total	Round 1	Round 2	Total
1st place, gold medalist(s)	Great Britain	Wilfred White	Nizefela	4	4	8	32.75	8	40.75
1st place, gold medalist(s)	Great Britain	Douglas Stewart	Aherlow	12	4	16	32.75	8	40.75
1st place, gold medalist(s)	Great Britain	Harry Llewellyn	Foxhunter	16.75	0	16.75	32.75	8	40.75
2nd place, silver medalist(s)	Chile	Óscar Cristi	Bambi	4	4	8	33.75	12	45.75
2nd place, silver medalist(s)	Chile	César Mendoza	Pollan	12	0	12	33.75	12	45.75
2nd place, silver medalist(s)	Chile	Ricardo Echeverría	Lindo Peal	17.75	8	25.75	33.75	12	45.75
3rd place, bronze medalist(s)	United States	William Steinkraus	Hollandia	4	9.25	13.25	23	29.25	52.25
3rd place, bronze medalist(s)	United States	Arthur McCashin	Miss Budweiser	12	4	16	23	29.25	52.25
3rd place, bronze medalist(s)	United States	John Russell	Democrat	7	16	23	23	29.25	52.25
4	Brazil	Eloy de Menezes	Biguá	4	4	8	28.5	28	56.5
4	Brazil	Renyldo Ferreira	Bibelot	12.5	8	20.5	28.5	28	56.5
4	Brazil	Alvaro de Toledo	Eldorado	12	16	28	28.5	28	56.5
5	France	Pierre Jonquères d'Oriola	Ali Baba	8	0	8	36	23	59
5	France	Bertrand Pernot du Breuil	Tourbillon	12	8	20	36	23	59
5	France	Jean, Marquis d'Orgeix	Arlequin D	16	15	31	36	23	59
6	Germany	Fritz Thiedemann	Meteor	0	8	8	32	28	60
6	Germany	Georg Höltig	Fink	8	12	20	32	28	60
6	Germany	Hans-Hermann Evers	Baden	24	8	32	32	28	60
7	Argentina	Sergio Dellachá	Santa Fe	8	4	12	28	32.75	60.75
7	Argentina	Argentino Molinuevo Sr.	Discutido	4	8	12	28	32.75	60.75
7	Argentina	Julio César Sagasta	Don Juan	16	20.75	36.75	28	32.75	60.75
8	Portugal	Henrique Callado	Caramulo	8	12	20	24	40	64
8	Portugal	João Lopes	Raso	12	8	20	24	40	64
8	Portugal	José Carvalhosa	Mondina	4	20	24	24	40	64
9	Mexico	Humberto Mariles	Petrolero	4	4.75	8.75	36	28.75	64.75
9	Mexico	Víctor Saucedo	Resorte II	12	12	24	36	28.75	64.75
9	Mexico	Roberto Viñals	Alteño	20	12	32	36	28.75	64.75
10	Spain	Jaime García	Quorom	12	8	20	40.25	27	67.25
10	Spain	Manuel Ordovas	Bohemio	8	12	20	40.25	27	67.25
10	Spain	Marcelino Gavilán	Quoniam	20.25	7	27.25	40.25	27	67.25
11	Sweden	Gunnar Palm	Lurifax	12	8	20	36	44	80
11	Sweden	Börje Jeppson	Spitfire	12	16	28	36	44	80
11	Sweden	Carl-Jan Hamilton	Halali	12	20	32	36	44	80
12	Egypt	Mohamed Khairy	Inch'Allah	8	8	16	44.25	36	80.25
12	Egypt	Gamal Haress	Sakr	8	16	24	44.25	36	80.25
12	Egypt	Mohamed Selim Zaki	Sali al Nabi	28.25	12	40.25	44.25	36	80.25
13	Romania	Gheorghe Antohi	Haimana	16	22.25	38.25	94	86.25	180.25
13	Romania	Ion Jipa	Troika	8	31	39	94	86.25	180.25
13	Romania	Ion Constantin	Vagabond	70	33	103	94	86.25	180.25
14	Soviet Union	Mikhail Vlasov	Rota	40	16	56	104.75	97	201.75
14	Soviet Union	Nikolay Shelenkov	Atiger	41.75	20.75	62.5	104.75	97	201.75
14	Soviet Union	Gavriil Budyonny	Yeger	23	60.25	83.25	104.75	97	201.75
–	Finland	Mauno Roiha	Roa	39	DNS	DNF	Eliminated		
–	Finland	Viktor Jansson	Jessa	DSQ	DNS	DSQ	Eliminated		
–	Finland	Henrik Lavonius	Lassi	DSQ	DNS	DSQ	Eliminated		

== Sources ==
- Organising Committee for the XV Olympiad, The (1952). The Official Report of the Organising Committee for the XV Olympiad (PDF). LA84 Foundation. pp. 517, 531–34. Archived from the original (PDF) on 2 November 2013.
