= Equestrian at the 1952 Summer Olympics – Individual jumping =

Equestrian at the Olympics

Individual jumping at the Games of the XV Olympiad
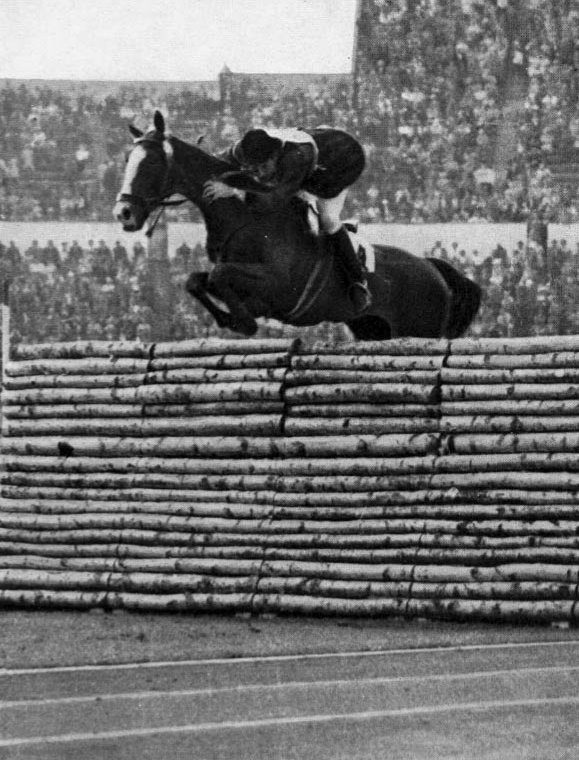
- Pierre Jonquères d'Oriola and Ali Baba
- Venue: Helsinki Olympic Stadium
- Date: 3 August 1956
- Competitors: 51 from 20 nations
- Winning total: 8

Medalists
1st place, gold medalist(s)		Pierre Jonquères d'Oriola; France
2nd place, silver medalist(s)		Óscar Cristi; Chile
3rd place, bronze medalist(s)		Fritz Thiedemann; Germany

The individual show jumping or "Prix des Nations" at the 1952 Summer Olympics took place on 3 August, at the Helsinki Olympic Stadium. It was the ninth appearance of the event. For the first time, the event featured two rounds. There were 51 competitors from 20 nations, with each nation able to send a team of up to three riders with the results shared between team and individual events. The event was won by Pierre Jonquères d'Oriola of France, the nation's first victory in individual jumping since 1912 and second overall (the first nation to win a second gold medal in the event; the previous eight editions were all won by riders of different nationalities). Óscar Cristi of Chile took silver for that nation's first medal in the event. German rider Fritz Thiedemann earned bronze.

== Background ==
This was the ninth appearance of the event, which had first been held at the 1900 Summer Olympics and has been held at every Summer Olympics at which equestrian sports have been featured (that is, excluding 1896, 1904, and 1908). It is the oldest event on the current programme, the only one that was held in 1900.

Three of the top 12 riders from the 1948 competition returned: gold medalist Humberto Mariles of Mexico, fifth-place finisher Jaime García of Spain, and seventh-place finisher Harry Llewellyn of Great Britain.

Egypt, South Korea, and the Soviet Union each made their debut in the event. France and Sweden both competed for the eighth time, tied for the most of any nation; Sweden had missed only the inaugural 1900 competition, while France missed the individual jumping in 1932.

== Competition format ==
The team and individual jumping competitions used the same results. The course was 786 metres long with 13 obstacles, including a triple jump obstacle (fence, water jump, horizontal wall). The time limit was 1 minute, 57.2 seconds (400 m/min). Penalty points were received for obstacle faults (3, 4, 6, or 8 points based on severity) or exceeding the time limit (0.25 points per second or fraction thereof over the limit). A third refusal or jumping an obstacle out of order resulted in elimination. Scores from the two runs were added together for a total score.

== Schedule ==
All times are Eastern European Summer Time (UTC+3)

Date	Time	Round
Sunday, 3 August 1952		Round 1 Round 2

== Results ==
A five-way tie for first resulted in a need for a barrage.

Rank	Rider	Nation	Horse	Round 1			Round 2			Total	Notes
Rank	Rider	Nation	Horse	Faults	Time	Total	Faults	Time	Total	Total	Notes
1	Óscar Cristi	Chile	Bambi	4	0	4	4	0	4	8	Jump-off
1	Pierre Jonquères d'Oriola	France	Ali Baba	8	0	8	0	0	0	8	Jump-off
1	Eloy de Menezes	Brazil	Biguá	4	0	4	4	0	4	8	Jump-off
1	Fritz Thiedemann	Germany	Meteor	0	0	0	8	0	8	8	Jump-off
1	Wilfred White	Great Britain	Nizefela	4	0	4	4	0	4	8	Jump-off
6	Humberto Mariles	Mexico	Petrolero	4	0	4	4	0.75	4.75	8.75	
7	Raimondo D'Inzeo	Italy	Litargirio	4	0	4	8	0	8	12	
7	Sergio Dellachá	Argentina	Santa Fe	8	0	8	4	0	4	12	
7	César Mendoza	Chile	Pollan	12	0	12	0	0	0	12	
7	Argentino Molinuevo Sr.	Argentina	Discutido	4	0	4	8	0	8	12	
11	William Steinkraus	United States	Hollandia	4	0	4	8	1.25	9.25	13.25	
12	Mohamed Khairy	Egypt	Inch'Allah	8	0	8	8	0	8	16	
12	Arthur McCashin	United States	Miss Budweiser	12	0	12	4	0	4	16	
12	Douglas Stewart	Great Britain	Aherlow	12	0	12	4	0	4	16	
15	Harry Llewellyn	Great Britain	Foxhunter	15	1.75	16.75	0	0	0	16.75	
16	Henrique Callado	Portugal	Caramulo	8	0	8	12	0	12	20	
16	Jaime García	Spain	Quorom	12	0	12	8	0	8	20	
16	Georg Höltig	Germany	Fink	8	0	8	12	0	12	20	
16	João Lopes	Portugal	Raso	12	0	12	8	0	8	20	
16	Manuel Ordovas	Spain	Bohemio	8	0	8	12	0	12	20	
16	Gunnar Palm	Sweden	Lurifax	12	0	12	8	0	8	20	
16	Bertrand Pernot du Breuil	France	Tourbillon	12	0	12	8	0	8	20	
23	Renyldo Ferreira	Brazil	Bibelot	11	1.5	12.5	8	0	8	20.5	
24	John Russell	United States	Democrat	7	0	7	16	0	16	23	
25	José Carvalhosa	Portugal	Mondina	4	0	4	20	0	20	24	
25	Gamal Haress	Egypt	Sakr	8	0	8	16	0	16	24	
25	Víctor Saucedo	Mexico	Resorte II	12	0	12	12	0	12	24	
28	Ricardo Echeverría	Chile	Lindo Peal	17	0.75	17.75	8	0	8	25.75	
29	Bjart Ording	Norway	Fram II	4	0	4	23	0	23	27	
30	Marcelino Gavilán	Spain	Quoniam	15	5.25	20.25	7	0	7	27.25	
31	Alvaro de Toledo	Brazil	Eldorado	12	0	12	16	0	16	28	
31	Börje Jeppson	Sweden	Spitfire	12	0	12	16	0	16	28	
31	Salvatore Oppes	Italy	Macezio	8	0	8	20	0	20	28	
34	Jean, Marquis d'Orgeix	France	Arlequin D	16	0	16	15	0	15	31	
35	Hans-Hermann Evers	Germany	Baden	24	0	24	8	0	8	32	
35	Carl-Jan Hamilton	Sweden	Halali	12	0	12	20	0	20	32	
35	Roberto Viñals	Mexico	Alteño	20	0	20	12	0	12	32	
38	Julio César Sagasta	Argentina	Don Juan	16	0	16	20	0.75	20.75	36.75	
39	Gheorghe Antohi	Romania	Haimana	16	0	16	20	2.25	22.25	38.25	
40	Ion Jipa	Romania	Troika	8	0	8	17	14	31	39	
41	Mohamed Selim Zaki	Egypt	Sali al Nabi	27	1.25	28.25	12	0	12	40.25	
42	Alexander Stoffel	Switzerland	Vol au Vent	28	12.25	40.25	4	0	4	44.25	
43	Mikhail Vlasov	Soviet Union	Rota	40	0	40	16	0	16	56	
44	Min Byeong-seon	South Korea	Parcifal	32	3.75	35.75	24	0	24	59.75	
45	Toshiaki Kitai	Japan	Ulysse	31	19	50	12	0	12	62	
46	Nikolay Shelenkov	Soviet Union	Atiger	27	14.75	41.75	20	0.75	20.75	62.5	
47	Gavriil Budyonny	Soviet Union	Yeger	23	0	23	43	17.25	60.25	83.25	
48	Ion Constantin	Romania	Vagabond	70	0	70	27	6	33	103	
—	Mauno Roiha	Finland	Roa	20	19	39	DNS			DNF	
—	Viktor Jansson	Finland	Jessa	DSQ			DNS			DNF	
—	Henrik Lavonius	Finland	Lassi	DSQ			DNS			DNF	

Jump-off

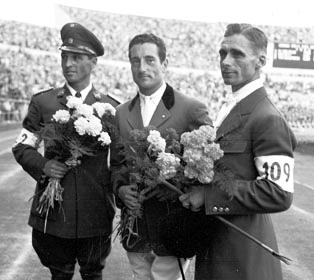
Cristi, Jonquères d'Oriola and Thiedemann

The five-way tie for first was resolved through a jump-off barrage. The course for the jump-off featured 6 obstacles. The same faults scoring was used. No time penalties were awarded, but the fastest time broke ties (based on faults) within the jump-off.

Rank	Rider	Nation	Horse	Faults	Time
1st place, gold medalist(s)	Pierre Jonquères d'Oriola	France	Ali Baba	0	40.0
2nd place, silver medalist(s)	Óscar Cristi	Chile	Bambi	4	44.0
3rd place, bronze medalist(s)	Fritz Thiedemann	Germany	Meteor	8	38.5
4	Eloy de Menezes	Brazil	Biguá	8	45.0
5	Wilfred White	Great Britain	Nizefela	12	43.0

== Sources ==
- Organising Committee for the XV Olympiad, The (1952). The Official Report of the Organising Committee for the XV Olympiad (PDF). LA84 Foundation. pp. 517, 531–33. Archived from the original (PDF) on 2 November 2013.
