= Mexico at the 1952 Summer Olympics =

- IOC code: MEX
- NOC: Mexican Olympic Committee

in Helsinki
- Competitors: 64 (61 men and 3 women) in 13 sports
- Medals Ranked 34th: Gold 0 Silver 1 Bronze 0 Total 1

Summer Olympics appearances (overview)
- 1900; 1904–1920; 1924; 1928; 1932; 1936; 1948; 1952; 1956; 1960; 1964; 1968; 1972; 1976; 1980; 1984; 1988; 1992; 1996; 2000; 2004; 2008; 2012; 2016; 2020; 2024; 2028

Mexico competed at the 1952 Summer Olympics in Helsinki, Finland. 64 competitors, 61 men and 3 women took part in 35 events in 13 sports.

== Medalists ==
Medal	Name	Sport	Event	Date
Silver	Joaquín Capilla	Diving	10 m platform	1 August

== Athletics ==
Key

- Note–Ranks given for track events are within the athlete's heat only
- Q = Qualified for the next round
- q = Qualified for the next round as a fastest loser or, in field events, by position without achieving the qualifying target
- NR = National record
- N/A = Round not applicable for the event
- Bye = Athlete not required to compete in round

Men
Track & road events

Athlete	Event	Heat		Quarterfinal		Semifinal		Final	
Athlete	Event	Result	Rank	Result	Rank	Result	Rank	Result	Rank
Javier Souza	100 m	11.32	5	did not advance					
Javier Souza	400 m	50.47	5	did not advance					

Field events

Athlete	Event	Qualification		Final	
Athlete	Event	Distance	Position	Distance	Position
Jorge Aguilera	Men's pole vault	did not start		did not advance	

Women
Field events

Athlete	Event	Qualification		Final	
Athlete	Event	Distance	Position	Distance	Position
Amalia Yubi	Women's javelin throw	35.59	19	did not advance	

== Basketball ==
Summary

Team	Event	Preliminary round	Group stage				Quarterfinal	Semifinal / Pl.	Final / BM / Pl.	
Team	Event	Opposition Result	Opposition Result	Opposition Result	Opposition Result	Rank	Opposition Result	Opposition Result	Opposition Result	Rank
Mexico men's	Men's tournament	Bye	Finland; W 66–48	Bulgaria; L 52–44	Soviet Union; L 71–62	3	did not advance			

Team roster

Mexico men's national basketball team roster
Players
Coaches

Pos.	No.	Name	Age – Date of birth	Height	Club	Ctr.
	5	Emilio López	28 – 23 August 1923
	13	Fernando Rojas	30 – 2 August 1921
	14	José Rojas	28 – 9 November 1923
	15	Filiberto Manzo	32 – 29 April 1920
	9	Héctor Guerrero	25 – 24 November 1926
	4	Jorge Cardiel	28 – 23 April 1924
	12	José Bru	24 – 9 June 1928
	7	José Meneses	28 – 11 January 1924
	8	José Cabrera	31 – 22 January 1921
	11	Pioquinto Soto	36 – 15 July 1915
	6	Rolando Rubalcava	28 – 22 July 1923
	6	Rubén Almanza	22 – 28 July 1929
	3	Sergio Holguín	23 – 15 April 1929

Head coach

- (Mexico) Antonio Delgado

Legend

- Club – describes last
  club before the competition
- Age – describes age
  on 14 July 1952

Group play

Pos	Team	Pld	W	L	PF	PA	PD	Pts	Qualification
1	Soviet Union	3	3	0	192	143	+49	6	Qualified for the quarterfinals
2	Bulgaria	3	2	1	163	182	−19	5	Qualified for the quarterfinals
3	Mexico	3	1	2	172	171	+1	4	
4	Finland	3	0	3	147	178	−31	3	

Source: Official Report, p. 676

25 July 1952

OR p. 680

Mexico	66–48	Finland
Scoring by half: 36–21, 30–27

Tennispalatsi, Helsinki
Referees: Siener (FRA), Atakol (TUR)

25 July 1952

OR p. 681

Bulgaria	52–44	Mexico
Scoring by half: 27–16, 25–28

Tennispalatsi, Helsinki
Referees: Lastra (ARG), Szilagyi (HUN)

27 July 1952

OR p. 683

Soviet Union	71–62	Mexico
Scoring by half: 31–21, 40–40

Tennispalatsi, Helsinki
Referees: Reverberi (ITA), Atakol (TUR)

== Boxing ==
Athlete	Event	Round of 32	Round of 16	Quarterfinals	Semifinals	Final	
Athlete	Event	Opposition Result	Opposition Result	Opposition Result	Opposition Result	Opposition Result	Rank
Jesús Tello	Flyweight	Handunge (CEY); L 2-1	did not advance				16
Raúl Macías	Bantamweight	Amaya (VEN); W 3-0	Garbuzov (URS); L 3-0	did not advance			9
José Dávalos	Welterweight	Tuñacao (PHI); W KO	Chychła (POL); L 3-0	did not advance			9

== Cycling ==
=== Road ===
Athlete	Event	Time	Rank
Julio Cepeda	Men's individual road race	did not finish	
Ricardo García	Men's individual road race	did not finish	
Francisco Lozano	Men's individual road race	did not finish	
Ángel Romero	Men's individual road race	5:24:33.9	45
Julio Cepeda; Ricardo García; Francisco Lozano; Ángel Romero	Men's team road race	did not finish	

== Diving ==
Men

Athlete	Event	Preliminaries		Final			
Athlete	Event	Points	Rank	Points	Rank	Total	Rank
Alberto Capilla	3 m springboard	61.85	20	did not advance			
Joaquín Capilla	3 m springboard	79.42	4 Q	98.91	4	178.33	4
Rodolfo Perea	3 m springboard	62.36	19	did not advance			
Alberto Capilla	10 m platform	72.95	5 Q	63.49	4	136.44	5
Joaquín Capilla	10 m platform	78.46	2 Q	66.75	2	145.21	2nd place, silver medalist(s)
Rodolfo Perea	10 m platform	72.88	6 Q	55.40	6	128.28	6

Women

Athlete	Event	Preliminaries		Final			
Athlete	Event	Points	Rank	Points	Rank	Total	Rank
Irma Lozano	10 m platform	33.33	13	did not advance			
Carlota Ríos	10 m platform	39.76	10	did not advance			

== Equestrian ==
=== Eventing ===
Athlete	Horse	Event	Dressage		Cross-country			Jumping		Total	
Athlete	Horse	Event	Points	Rank	Points	Total	Rank	Points	Rank	Points	Rank
Mario Becerril	Tamaulipas	Individual	-156.33	39	-40	-196.33	21	0	31	-196.33	21

=== Jumping ===
Athlete	Horse	Event	Round 1		Round 2		Final		
Athlete	Horse	Event	Penalties	Rank	Penalties	Rank	Total	Jump-off	Rank
Humberto Mariles	Petrolero	Individual	4	2	4.75	3	8.75	—N/a	6
Víctor Saucedo	Resorte II	Individual	12	5	12	7	24	—N/a	25
Roberto Viñals	Alteño	Individual	20	10	12	7	32	—N/a	35
Humberto Mariles; Víctor Saucedo; Roberto Viñals	See above	Team	36	8	28.75	6	64.75	—N/a	9

== Fencing ==
Men

Athlete	Event	Round 1			Quarterfinals			Semifinals			Final		
Athlete	Event	MW	ML	Rank	MW	ML	Rank	MW	ML	Rank	MW	ML	Rank
Antonio Haro	Men's foil	did not start			did not advance								
Emilio Meraz	Men's foil	did not start			did not advance								
Benito Ramos	Men's foil	4	1	1 Q	1	5	7	did not advance					
Antonio Haro	Men's épée	5	1	1 Q	4	4	5	did not advance					
Emilio Meraz	Men's épée	4	3	4 Q	3	4	5	did not advance					
Benito Ramos	Men's épée	4	3	3 Q	did not start			did not advance					
Rafael Cámara	Men's sabre	2	5	7	did not advance								
Antonio Haro	Men's sabre	4	2	3 Q	3	4	6	did not advance					
Benito Ramos	Men's sabre	2	4	5	did not advance								

== Modern pentathlon ==
Athlete	Fencing (épée one touch)		Swimming (300 m freestyle)		Riding (cross-country)			Shooting (10 m air pistol)		Running (4000 m)		Total points	Final rank
Athlete	Results (Wins)	Rank	Time	Rank	Penalties	Time	Rank	Points	Rank	Time	Rank	Total points	Final rank
Antonio Almada	16	42	5:06.7	30	17	10:58.3	29	142	49	17:15.7	42	193	44
José Pérez	19	34	4:39.9	19	23	11:18.0	34	167	37	17:00.7	39	163	38
David Romero	16	43	5:00.4	26	46	11:57.2	38	158	45	17:22.6	44	202	47

== Shooting ==
Athlete	Event	Final	
Athlete	Event	Points	Rank
Ernesto Montemayor Sr.	25 m rapid fire pistol	565	15
Carlos Rodríguez	25 m rapid fire pistol	561	18
Raúl Ibarra	50 metre pistol	530	13
José Reyes Rodríguez	50 metre pistol	523	18

== Swimming ==
Athlete	Event	Heat		Semifinal		Final	
Athlete	Event	Time	Rank	Time	Rank	Time	Rank
Alberto Isaac	100 m freestyle	did not start		did not advance			
Juan Lanz	100 m freestyle	1:00.9	30	did not advance			
René Muñiz	100 m freestyle	1:00.5	25	did not advance			
César Borja	400 m freestyle	did not start		did not advance			
Efrén Fierro	400 m freestyle	did not start		did not advance			
Tonatiuh Gutiérrez	400 m freestyle	did not start		did not advance			
César Borja	1500 m freestyle	—N/a		19:43.3	3	did not advance	
Efrén Fierro	1500 m freestyle	—N/a		19:55.8	3	did not advance	
Tonatiuh Gutiérrez	1500 m freestyle	—N/a		19:18.9	3	did not advance	
Guillermo Fierro	100 m backstroke	—N/a		did not start		did not advance	
Clemente Mejía	100 m backstroke	—N/a		1:10.7	2	did not advance	
Óscar Cendejas	200 m breaststroke	did not start		did not advance			
Alejandro Fierro	200 m breaststroke	did not start		did not advance			
Walter Ocampo	200 m breaststroke	2:44.8	4	did not advance			
César Borja; Efrén Fierro; Tonatiuh Gutiérrez; Alberto Isaac	4 × 200 m freestyle	—N/a		9:15.7	6	did not advance	

== Water polo ==
Summary

Key:
- FT – After full time.
- P – Match decided by penalty-shootout.

Team	Event	First eliminating round	Second eliminating round	Group stage				Semifinal	Final / BM	
Team	Event	Opposition Score	Opposition Score	Opposition Score	Opposition Score	Opposition Score	Rank	Opposition Score	Opposition Score	Rank
Mexico men's	Men's tournament	Hungary; L 4–13	did not advance							

== Weightlifting ==
Athlete	Event	Clean & Press		Snatch		Clean & Jerk		Total	
Athlete	Event	Result	Rank	Result	Rank	Result	Rank	Result	Rank
David Pimentel	−75 kg	102.5	=9	95	21			197.5	21
Armando Rueda	−82.5 kg	115	=9	107.5	=14	137.5	=16	360	12

== Wrestling ==
Key:

- F - Fall.
- D - Decision

Freestyle

Wrestlers who accumulated 5 "bad points" were eliminated. Points were given as follows: 1 point for victories short of a fall and 3 points for every loss.

Athlete	Event	Round 1	Round 2	Round 3	Round 4	Round 5	Final	Points	Rank
Athlete	Event	Opposition Result	Opposition Result	Opposition Result	Opposition Result	Opposition Result	Opposition Result	Points	Rank
Rodolfo Dávila	–52 kg	Baise (RSA); L 3–0 ^{D}	Bye	Kitano (JPN); L ^{F}	did not advance				
Leonardo Basurto	–57 kg	Schmitz (GER); L ^{F}	Jadhav (IND); L ^{F}	did not advance					
Mario Tovar González	–67 kg	Cools (BEL); L 3-0 ^{D}	Østrand (DEN); L 3-0 ^{D}	did not advance					
Antonio Rosado	–73 kg	Smith (USA); L ^{F}	Longarella (ARG); L ^{F}	did not advance					
Eduardo Assam	–79 kg	Gocke (GER); L 3-0 ^{D}	Zafer (TUR); L ^{F}	did not advance					
