= Wrestling at the 1948 Summer Olympics – Men's freestyle middleweight =

Olympic wrestling tournament

Men's freestyle middleweight at the Games of the XIV Olympiad
- Venue: Empress Hall, Earls Court Exhibition Centre
- Dates: 29–31 July 1948
- Competitors: 16 from 16 nations

Medalists
1st place, gold medalist(s)		Glen Brand	United States
2nd place, silver medalist(s)		Adil Candemir	Turkey
3rd place, bronze medalist(s)		Erik Lindén	Sweden

The men's freestyle middleweight competition at the 1948 Summer Olympics in London took place from 29 July to 31 July at the Empress Hall, Earls Court Exhibition Centre. Nations were limited to one competitor. Middleweight was the third-heaviest category, including wrestlers weighing 73 to 79 kilograms (160.9 to 174.2 lb).

This freestyle wrestling competition continued to use the "bad points" elimination system introduced at the 1928 Summer Olympics for Greco-Roman and at the 1932 Summer Olympics for freestyle wrestling, with the slight modification introduced in 1936. Each round featured all wrestlers pairing off and wrestling one bout (with one wrestler having a bye if there were an odd number). The loser received 3 points if the loss was by fall or unanimous decision and 2 points if the decision was 2-1 (this was the modification from prior years, where all losses were 3 points). The winner received 1 point if the win was by decision and 0 points if the win was by fall. At the end of each round, any wrestler with at least 5 points was eliminated.

== Results ==
=== Round 1 ===
Hariri retired after his bout.

Bouts

Winner	Nation	Victory Type	Loser	Nation
Adil Candemir	Turkey	Fall	Bruce Arthur	Australia
Maurice Vachon	Canada	Fall	Keshav Roy	India
Eddie Bowey	Great Britain	Decision, 3–0	Eduardo Assam	Mexico
Paavo Sepponen	Finland	Decision, 3–0	André Brunaud	France
Paul Dätwyler	Switzerland	Fall	Anton Vogel	Austria
Callie Reitz	South Africa	Decision, 2–1	Abbas Ahmad	Egypt
Erik Lindén	Sweden	Fall	Jean-Baptiste Benoy	Belgium
Glen Brand	United States	Decision, 2–1	Abbas Hariri	Iran

Points

Rank	Wrestler	Nation	Start	Earned	Total
1	Adil Candemir	Turkey	0	0	0
1	Paul Dätwyler	Switzerland	0	0	0
1	Erik Lindén	Sweden	0	0	0
1	Maurice Vachon	Canada	0	0	0
5	Eddie Bowey	Great Britain	0	1	1
5	Glen Brand	United States	0	1	1
5	Callie Reitz	South Africa	0	1	1
5	Paavo Sepponen	Finland	0	1	1
9	Abbas Ahmad	Egypt	0	2	2
10	Bruce Arthur	Australia	0	3	3
10	Eduardo Assam	Mexico	0	3	3
10	Jean-Baptiste Benoy	Belgium	0	3	3
10	André Brunaud	France	0	3	3
10	Keshav Roy	India	0	3	3
10	Anton Vogel	Austria	0	3	3
16	Abbas Hariri	Iran	0	2	2*

=== Round 2 ===
Bouts

Winner	Nation	Victory Type	Loser	Nation
Bruce Arthur	Australia	Fall	Keshav Roy	India
Adil Candemir	Turkey	Decision, 2–1	Maurice Vachon	Canada
Paavo Sepponen	Finland	Fall	Eduardo Assam	Mexico
André Brunaud	France	Decision, 3–0	Eddie Bowey	Great Britain
Callie Reitz	South Africa	Fall	Anton Vogel	Austria
Paul Dätwyler	Switzerland	Decision, 2–1	Jean-Baptiste Benoy	Belgium
Erik Lindén	Sweden	Fall	Abbas Ahmad	Egypt
Glen Brand	United States	Bye	N/A	N/A

Points

Rank	Wrestler	Nation	Start	Earned	Total
1	Erik Lindén	Sweden	0	0	0
2	Glen Brand	United States	1	0	1
2	Adil Candemir	Turkey	0	1	1
2	Paul Dätwyler	Switzerland	0	1	1
2	Callie Reitz	South Africa	1	0	1
2	Paavo Sepponen	Finland	1	0	1
7	Maurice Vachon	Canada	0	2	2
8	Bruce Arthur	Australia	3	0	3
9	Eddie Bowey	Great Britain	1	3	4
9	André Brunaud	France	3	1	4
11	Abbas Ahmad	Egypt	2	3	5
11	Jean-Baptiste Benoy	Belgium	3	2	5
13	Eduardo Assam	Mexico	3	3	6
13	Keshav Roy	India	3	3	6
13	Anton Vogel	Austria	3	3	6

=== Round 3 ===
Bouts

Winner	Nation	Victory Type	Loser	Nation
Glen Brand	United States	Fall	Bruce Arthur	Australia
Paavo Sepponen	Finland	Decision, 3–0	Maurice Vachon	Canada
André Brunaud	France	Abandoned	Paul Dätwyler	Switzerland
Erik Lindén	Sweden	Decision, 3–0	Callie Reitz	South Africa
Adil Candemir	Turkey	Fall	Eddie Bowey	Great Britain

Points

Rank	Wrestler	Nation	Start	Earned	Total
1	Glen Brand	United States	1	0	1
1	Adil Candemir	Turkey	1	0	1
3	Erik Lindén	Sweden	1	1	2
3	Paavo Sepponen	Finland	1	1	2
5	André Brunaud	France	4	0	4
5	Callie Reitz	South Africa	1	3	4
7	Maurice Vachon	Canada	2	3	5
8	Bruce Arthur	Australia	3	3	6
9	Eddie Bowey	Great Britain	4	3	7
10	Paul Dätwyler	Switzerland	0	3	3*

=== Round 4 ===
Reitz defeated Sepponen but received one point result was by decision; because the point was Reitz's fifth, he was eliminated despite the victory. The bout ultimately served as the fourth-place tie-breaker between the two men as well, as both finished with five points.

Bouts

Winner	Nation	Victory Type	Loser	Nation
Glen Brand	United States	Fall	Adil Candemir	Turkey
Callie Reitz	South Africa	Decision, 3–0	Paavo Sepponen	Finland
Erik Lindén	Sweden	Decision, 3–0	André Brunaud	France

Points

Rank	Wrestler	Nation	Start	Earned	Total
1	Glen Brand	United States	1	0	1
2	Erik Lindén	Sweden	2	1	3
3	Adil Candemir	Turkey	1	3	4
4	Callie Reitz	South Africa	4	1	5
5	Paavo Sepponen	Finland	2	3	5
6	André Brunaud	France	4	3	7

=== Round 5 ===
Brand defeated Lindén to eliminate the latter. Because Brand and Candemir, the only two wrestlers remaining after that, had already faced each other, they did not compete again and Brand took the gold medal with 2 points to Candemir's 4.

Bouts

Winner	Nation	Victory Type	Loser	Nation
Glen Brand	United States	Decision, 3–0	Erik Lindén	Sweden
Adil Candemir	Turkey	Bye	N/A	N/A

Points

Rank	Wrestler	Nation	Start	Earned	Total
1st place, gold medalist(s)	Glen Brand	United States	1	1	2
2nd place, silver medalist(s)	Adil Candemir	Turkey	4	0	4
3rd place, bronze medalist(s)	Erik Lindén	Sweden	3	3	6
