= Wrestling at the 1948 Summer Olympics – Men's Greco-Roman middleweight =

Wrestling at the Olympics

Men's Greco-Roman middleweight at the Games of the XIV Olympiad
- Venue: Empress Hall, Earls Court Exhibition Centre
- Dates: 3–6 August 1948
- Competitors: 13 from 13 nations

Medalists
1st place, gold medalist(s)		Axel Grönberg	Sweden
2nd place, silver medalist(s)		Muhlis Tayfur	Turkey
3rd place, bronze medalist(s)		Ercole Gallegati	Italy

The men's Greco-Roman middleweight competition at the 1948 Summer Olympics in London took place from 3 August to 6 August at the Empress Hall, Earls Court Exhibition Centre. Nations were limited to one competitor. Middleweight was the third-heaviest category, including wrestlers weighing 73 to 79 kilograms (160.9 to 174.2 lb).

This Greco-Roman wrestling competition continued to use the "bad points" elimination system introduced at the 1928 Summer Olympics for Greco-Roman and at the 1932 Summer Olympics for freestyle wrestling, with the slight modification introduced in 1936. Each round featured all wrestlers pairing off and wrestling one bout (with one wrestler having a bye if there were an odd number). The loser received 3 points if the loss was by fall or unanimous decision and 2 points if the decision was 2-1 (this was the modification from prior years, where all losses were 3 points). The winner received 1 point if the win was by decision and 0 points if the win was by fall. At the end of each round, any wrestler with at least 5 points was eliminated.

== Results ==
=== Round 1 ===
Bouts

Winner	Nation	Victory Type	Loser	Nation
Axel Grönberg	Sweden	Fall	Abbas Ahmad	Egypt
Juho Kinnunen	Finland	Decision, 2–1	Gyula Németi	Hungary
Muhlis Tayfur	Turkey	Decision, 3–0	Klaas de Groot	Netherlands
Ercole Gallegati	Italy	Fall	Alberto Bolzi	Argentina
Anton Vogel	Austria	Fall	Stan Bissell	Great Britain
Jean-Baptiste Benoy	Belgium	Fall	Ernst Kolb	Switzerland
Kaare Larsen	Norway	Bye	N/A	N/A

Points

Rank	Wrestler	Nation	Start	Earned	Total
1	Jean-Baptiste Benoy	Belgium	0	0	0
1	Ercole Gallegati	Italy	0	0	0
1	Axel Grönberg	Sweden	0	0	0
1	Kaare Larsen	Norway	0	0	0
1	Anton Vogel	Austria	0	0	0
6	Juho Kinnunen	Finland	0	1	1
6	Muhlis Tayfur	Turkey	0	1	1
8	Gyula Németi	Hungary	0	2	2
9	Abbas Ahmad	Egypt	0	3	3
9	Alberto Bolzi	Argentina	0	3	3
9	Stan Bissell	Great Britain	0	3	3
9	Klaas de Groot	Netherlands	0	3	3
9	Ernst Kolb	Switzerland	0	3	3

=== Round 2 ===
Bouts

Winner	Nation	Victory Type	Loser	Nation
Axel Grönberg	Sweden	Decision, 3–0	Kaare Larsen	Norway
Juho Kinnunen	Finland	Fall	Abbas Ahmad	Egypt
Gyula Németi	Hungary	Fall	Klaas de Groot	Netherlands
Muhlis Tayfur	Turkey	Fall	Alberto Bolzi	Argentina
Ercole Gallegati	Italy	Decision, 3–0	Anton Vogel	Austria
Jean-Baptiste Benoy	Belgium	Fall	Stan Bissell	Great Britain
Ernst Kolb	Switzerland	Bye	N/A	N/A

Points

Rank	Wrestler	Nation	Start	Earned	Total
1	Jean-Baptiste Benoy	Belgium	0	0	0
2	Ercole Gallegati	Italy	0	1	1
2	Axel Grönberg	Sweden	0	1	1
2	Juho Kinnunen	Finland	1	0	1
2	Muhlis Tayfur	Turkey	1	0	1
6	Gyula Németi	Hungary	2	0	2
7	Ernst Kolb	Switzerland	3	0	3
7	Kaare Larsen	Norway	0	3	3
7	Anton Vogel	Austria	0	3	3
10	Abbas Ahmad	Egypt	3	3	6
10	Alberto Bolzi	Argentina	3	3	6
10	Stan Bissell	Great Britain	3	3	6
10	Klaas de Groot	Netherlands	3	3	6

=== Round 3 ===
Bouts

Winner	Nation	Victory Type	Loser	Nation
Kaare Larsen	Norway	Fall	Ernst Kolb	Switzerland
Axel Grönberg	Sweden	Fall	Juho Kinnunen	Finland
Gyula Németi	Hungary	Fall	Ercole Gallegati	Italy
Muhlis Tayfur	Turkey	Fall	Anton Vogel	Austria
Jean-Baptiste Benoy	Belgium	Bye	N/A	N/A

Points

Rank	Wrestler	Nation	Start	Earned	Total
1	Jean-Baptiste Benoy	Belgium	0	0	0
2	Axel Grönberg	Sweden	1	0	1
2	Muhlis Tayfur	Turkey	1	0	1
4	Gyula Németi	Hungary	2	0	2
5	Kaare Larsen	Norway	3	0	3
6	Ercole Gallegati	Italy	1	3	4
6	Juho Kinnunen	Finland	1	3	4
8	Ernst Kolb	Switzerland	3	3	6
8	Anton Vogel	Austria	3	3	6

=== Round 4 ===
Kinnunen took 6th place over Németi based on head-to-head results from the first round.

Bouts

Winner	Nation	Victory Type	Loser	Nation
Kaare Larsen	Norway	Decision, 3–0	Jean-Baptiste Benoy	Belgium
Axel Grönberg	Sweden	Decision, 3–0	Gyula Németi	Hungary
Juho Kinnunen	Finland	Decision, 3–0	Muhlis Tayfur	Turkey
Ercole Gallegati	Italy	Bye	N/A	N/A

Points

Rank	Wrestler	Nation	Start	Earned	Total
1	Axel Grönberg	Sweden	1	1	2
2	Jean-Baptiste Benoy	Belgium	0	3	3
3	Ercole Gallegati	Italy	4	0	4
3	Kaare Larsen	Norway	3	1	4
3	Muhlis Tayfur	Turkey	1	3	4
6	Juho Kinnunen	Finland	4	1	5
7	Gyula Németi	Hungary	2	3	5

=== Round 5 ===
Bouts

Winner	Nation	Victory Type	Loser	Nation
Axel Grönberg	Sweden	Fall	Jean-Baptiste Benoy	Belgium
Ercole Gallegati	Italy	Decision, 3–0	Kaare Larsen	Norway
Muhlis Tayfur	Turkey	Bye	N/A	N/A

Points

Rank	Wrestler	Nation	Start	Earned	Total
1	Axel Grönberg	Sweden	2	0	2
2	Muhlis Tayfur	Turkey	4	0	4
3rd place, bronze medalist(s)	Ercole Gallegati	Italy	4	1	5
4	Jean-Baptiste Benoy	Belgium	3	3	6
5	Kaare Larsen	Norway	4	3	7

=== Round 6 ===
Bouts

Winner	Nation	Victory Type	Loser	Nation
Axel Grönberg	Sweden	Decision, 3–0	Muhlis Tayfur	Turkey

Points

Rank	Wrestler	Nation	Start	Earned	Total
1st place, gold medalist(s)	Axel Grönberg	Sweden	2	1	3
2nd place, silver medalist(s)	Muhlis Tayfur	Turkey	4	3	7
