= Wrestling at the 1952 Summer Olympics – Men's freestyle middleweight =

Wrestling at the Olympics

Men's freestyle middleweight at the Games of the XV Olympiad
- Venue: Messuhalli
- Dates: 20–23 July 1952
- Competitors: 17 from 17 nations

Medalists
1st place, gold medalist(s)		David Tsimakuridze	Soviet Union
2nd place, silver medalist(s)		Gholam Reza Takhti	Iran
3rd place, bronze medalist(s)		György Gurics	Hungary

The men's freestyle middleweight competition at the 1952 Summer Olympics in Helsinki took place from 20 July to 23 July at Messuhalli. Nations were limited to one competitor. Middleweight was the third-heaviest category, including wrestlers weighing 73 to 79 kilograms (160.9 to 174.2 lb).

== Competition format ==
This freestyle wrestling competition continued to use the "bad points" elimination system introduced at the 1928 Summer Olympics for Greco-Roman and at the 1932 Summer Olympics for freestyle wrestling, removing the slight modification introduced in 1936 and used until 1948 (which had a reduced penalty for a loss by 2–1 decision). Each round featured all wrestlers pairing off and wrestling one bout (with one wrestler having a bye if there were an odd number). The loser received 3 points. The winner received 1 point if the win was by decision and 0 points if the win was by fall. At the end of each round, any wrestler with at least 5 points was eliminated. This elimination continued until the medal rounds, which began when 3 wrestlers remained. These 3 wrestlers each faced each other in a round-robin medal round (with earlier results counting, if any had wrestled another before); record within the medal round determined medals, with bad points breaking ties.

== Results ==
=== Round 1 ===
Everaerts withdrew after his bout.

Bouts

Winner	Nation	Victory Type	Loser	Nation
Callie Reitz	South Africa	Fall	Pio Chirinos	Venezuela
Gustav Gocke	Germany	Decision, 3–0	Eduardo Assam	Mexico
Haydar Zafer	Turkey	Decision, 3–0	Adalberto Lepri	Italy
León Genuth	Argentina	Decision, 2–1	Veikko Lahti	Finland
Gholam Reza Takhti	Iran	Fall	André Brunaud	France
Dan Hodge	United States	Fall	Mohamed Abdul Ramada Hussain	Egypt
Bengt Lindblad	Sweden	Decision, 2–1	David Tsimakuridze	Soviet Union
György Gurics	Hungary	Fall	Augustus Everaerts	Belgium
Felix Neuhaus	Switzerland	Bye	N/A	N/A

Points

Rank	Wrestler	Nation	Start	Earned	Total
1	György Gurics	Hungary	0	0	0
1	Dan Hodge	United States	0	0	0
1	Felix Neuhaus	Switzerland	0	0	0
1	Callie Reitz	South Africa	0	0	0
1	Gholam Reza Takhti	Iran	0	0	0
6	León Genuth	Argentina	0	1	1
6	Gustav Gocke	Germany	0	1	1
6	Bengt Lindblad	Sweden	0	1	1
6	Haydar Zafer	Turkey	0	1	1
10	Eduardo Assam	Mexico	0	3	3
10	André Brunaud	Finland	0	3	3
10	Pio Chirinos	Venezuela	0	3	3
10	Mohamed Abdul Ramada Hussain	Egypt	0	3	3
10	Veikko Lahti	Finland	0	3	3
10	Adalberto Lepri	Italy	0	3	3
10	David Tsimakuridze	Soviet Union	0	3	3
17	Augustus Everaerts	Belgium	0	3	3*

=== Round 2 ===
Bouts

Winner	Nation	Victory Type	Loser	Nation
Callie Reitz	South Africa	Decision, 3–0	Felix Neuhaus	Switzerland
Gustav Gocke	Germany	Fall	Pio Chirinos	Venezuela
Haydar Zafer	Turkey	Fall	Eduardo Assam	Mexico
León Genuth	Argentina	Fall	Adalberto Lepri	Italy
Gholam Reza Takhti	Iran	Fall	Veikko Lahti	Finland
Mohamed Abdul Ramada Hussain	Egypt	Decision, 3–0	André Brunaud	France
David Tsimakuridze	Soviet Union	Fall	Dan Hodge	United States
György Gurics	Hungary	Decision, 2–1	Bengt Lindblad	Sweden

Points

Rank	Wrestler	Nation	Start	Earned	Total
1	Gholam Reza Takhti	Iran	0	0	0
2	León Genuth	Argentina	1	0	1
2	Gustav Gocke	Germany	1	0	1
2	György Gurics	Hungary	0	1	1
2	Callie Reitz	South Africa	0	1	1
2	Haydar Zafer	Turkey	1	0	1
7	Dan Hodge	United States	0	3	3
7	Felix Neuhaus	Switzerland	0	3	3
7	David Tsimakuridze	Soviet Union	3	0	3
10	Mohamed Abdul Ramada Hussain	Egypt	3	1	4
10	Bengt Lindblad	Sweden	1	3	4
12	Eduardo Assam	Mexico	3	3	6
12	André Brunaud	Finland	3	3	6
12	Pio Chirinos	Venezuela	3	3	6
12	Veikko Lahti	Finland	3	3	6
12	Adalberto Lepri	Italy	3	3	6

=== Round 3 ===
Bouts

Winner	Nation	Victory Type	Loser	Nation
Gustav Gocke	Germany	Decision, 3–0	Felix Neuhaus	Switzerland
Haydar Zafer	Turkey	Decision, 3–0	Callie Reitz	South Africa
Gholam Reza Takhti	Iran	Fall	León Genuth	Argentina
David Tsimakuridze	Soviet Union	Fall	Mohamed Abdul Ramada Hussain	Egypt
Bengt Lindblad	Sweden	Decision, 2–1	Dan Hodge	United States
György Gurics	Hungary	Bye	N/A	N/A

Points

Rank	Wrestler	Nation	Start	Earned	Total
1	Gholam Reza Takhti	Iran	0	0	0
2	György Gurics	Hungary	1	0	1
3	Gustav Gocke	Germany	1	1	2
3	Haydar Zafer	Turkey	1	1	2
5	David Tsimakuridze	Soviet Union	3	0	3
6	León Genuth	Argentina	1	3	4
6	Callie Reitz	South Africa	1	3	4
8	Bengt Lindblad	Sweden	4	1	5
9	Dan Hodge	United States	3	3	6
9	Felix Neuhaus	Switzerland	3	3	6
11	Mohamed Abdul Ramada Hussain	Egypt	4	3	7

=== Round 4 ===
Bouts

Winner	Nation	Victory Type	Loser	Nation
György Gurics	Hungary	Decision, 2–1	Callie Reitz	South Africa
Gustav Gocke	Germany	Decision, 3–0	León Genuth	Argentina
Gholam Reza Takhti	Iran	Decision, 3–0	Haydar Zafer	Turkey
David Tsimakuridze	Soviet Union	Bye	N/A	N/A

Points

Rank	Wrestler	Nation	Start	Earned	Total
1	Gholam Reza Takhti	Iran	0	1	1
2	György Gurics	Hungary	1	1	2
3	Gustav Gocke	Germany	2	1	3
3	David Tsimakuridze	Soviet Union	3	0	3
5	Haydar Zafer	Turkey	2	3	5
6	León Genuth	Argentina	4	3	7
6	Callie Reitz	South Africa	4	3	7

=== Round 5 ===
Bouts

Winner	Nation	Victory Type	Loser	Nation
David Tsimakuridze	Soviet Union	Decision, 3–0	György Gurics	Hungary
Gholam Reza Takhti	Iran	Decision, 3–0	Gustav Gocke	Germany

Points

Rank	Wrestler	Nation	Start	Earned	Total
1	Gholam Reza Takhti	Iran	1	1	2
2	David Tsimakuridze	Soviet Union	3	1	4
3	György Gurics	Hungary	2	3	5
4	Gustav Gocke	Germany	3	3	6

=== Medal rounds ===
Tsimakuridze's victory over Gurics in round 5 counted for the medal rounds. The Soviet wrestler defeated Takhti to finish 2–0 against the other medalists and earn the gold medal. Gurics was injured after the round 5 bout and was unable to face Takhti for the silver medal.

Bouts

Winner	Nation	Victory Type	Loser	Nation
David Tsimakuridze	Soviet Union	Decision, 2–1	Gholam Reza Takhti	Iran
Gholam Reza Takhti	Iran	Walkover	György Gurics	Hungary

Points

Rank	Wrestler	Nation	Wins	Losses	Start	Earned	Total
1st place, gold medalist(s)	David Tsimakuridze	Soviet Union	2	0	4	1	5
2nd place, silver medalist(s)	Gholam Reza Takhti	Iran	1	1	2	3	5
3rd place, bronze medalist(s)	György Gurics	Hungary	0	2	5	3	8
