= Wrestling at the 1952 Summer Olympics – Men's Greco-Roman middleweight =

Wrestling at the Olympics

Men's Greco-Roman middleweight at the Games of the XV Olympiad
- Venue: Messuhalli
- Dates: 24–27 July 1952
- Competitors: 11 from 11 nations

Medalists
1st place, gold medalist(s)		Axel Grönberg	Sweden
2nd place, silver medalist(s)		Kalervo Rauhala	Finland
3rd place, bronze medalist(s)		Nikolay Belov	Soviet Union

The men's Greco-Roman middleweight competition at the 1952 Summer Olympics in Helsinki took place from 24 July to 27 July at Messuhalli. Nations were limited to one competitor. Middleweight was the third-heaviest category, including wrestlers weighing 73 to 79 kilograms (160.9 to 174.2 lb).

== Competition format ==
This Greco-Roman wrestling competition continued to use the "bad points" elimination system introduced at the 1928 Summer Olympics for Greco-Roman and at the 1932 Summer Olympics for freestyle wrestling, removing the slight modification introduced in 1936 and used until 1948 (which had a reduced penalty for a loss by 2–1 decision). Each round featured all wrestlers pairing off and wrestling one bout (with one wrestler having a bye if there were an odd number). The loser received 3 points. The winner received 1 point if the win was by decision and 0 points if the win was by fall. At the end of each round, any wrestler with at least 5 points was eliminated. This elimination continued until the medal rounds, which began when 3 wrestlers remained. These 3 wrestlers each faced each other in a round-robin medal round (with earlier results counting, if any had wrestled another before); record within the medal round determined medals, with bad points breaking ties.

== Results ==
=== Round 1 ===
Bouts

Winner	Nation	Victory Type	Loser	Nation
Gustav Gocke	Germany	Decision, 2–1	Ercole Gallegati	Italy
Axel Grönberg	Sweden	Decision, 3–0	Kalervo Rauhala	Finland
Ali Özdemir	Turkey	Decision, 2–1	Adel Ibrahim Moustafa	Egypt
Gyula Németi	Hungary	Decision, 3–0	Lars Bilet	Norway
Nikolay Belov	Soviet Union	Fall	Jerzy Gryt	Poland
Émile Courtois	Belgium	Bye	N/A	N/A

Points

Rank	Wrestler	Nation	Start	Earned	Total
1	Nikolay Belov	Soviet Union	0	0	0
1	Émile Courtois	Belgium	0	0	0
3	Gustav Gocke	Germany	0	1	1
3	Axel Grönberg	Sweden	0	1	1
3	Gyula Németi	Hungary	0	1	1
3	Ali Özdemir	Turkey	0	1	1
7	Lars Bilet	Norway	0	3	3
7	Ercole Gallegati	Italy	0	3	3
7	Jerzy Gryt	Poland	0	3	3
7	Adel Ibrahim Moustafa	Egypt	0	3	3
7	Kalervo Rauhala	Finland	0	3	3

=== Round 2 ===
Bouts

Winner	Nation	Victory Type	Loser	Nation
Ercole Gallegati	Italy	Fall	Émile Courtois	Belgium
Axel Grönberg	Sweden	Decision, 3–0	Gustav Gocke	Germany
Kalervo Rauhala	Finland	Decision, 3–0	Adel Ibrahim Moustafa	Egypt
Ali Özdemir	Turkey	Decision, 3–0	Lars Bilet	Norway
Gyula Németi	Hungary	Fall	Jerzy Gryt	Poland
Nikolay Belov	Soviet Union	Bye	N/A	N/A

Points

Rank	Wrestler	Nation	Start	Earned	Total
1	Nikolay Belov	Soviet Union	0	0	0
2	Gyula Németi	Hungary	1	0	1
3	Axel Grönberg	Sweden	1	1	2
3	Ali Özdemir	Turkey	1	1	2
5	Émile Courtois	Belgium	0	3	3
5	Ercole Gallegati	Italy	3	0	3
7	Gustav Gocke	Germany	1	3	4
7	Kalervo Rauhala	Finland	3	1	4
9	Lars Bilet	Norway	3	3	6
9	Jerzy Gryt	Poland	3	3	6
9	Adel Ibrahim Moustafa	Egypt	3	3	6

=== Round 3 ===
Bouts

Winner	Nation	Victory Type	Loser	Nation
Nikolay Belov	Soviet Union	Walkover	Émile Courtois	Belgium
Axel Grönberg	Sweden	Decision, 3–0	Ercole Gallegati	Italy
Kalervo Rauhala	Finland	Fall	Gustav Gocke	Germany
Gyula Németi	Hungary	Decision, 3–0	Ali Özdemir	Turkey

Points

Rank	Wrestler	Nation	Start	Earned	Total
1	Nikolay Belov	Soviet Union	0	0	0
2	Gyula Németi	Hungary	1	1	2
3	Axel Grönberg	Sweden	2	1	3
4	Kalervo Rauhala	Finland	4	0	4
5	Ali Özdemir	Turkey	2	3	5
6	Émile Courtois	Belgium	3	3	6
6	Ercole Gallegati	Italy	3	3	6
8	Gustav Gocke	Germany	4	3	7

=== Round 4 ===
The tie for third-place was broken by head-to-head results, with Rauhala advancing to the medal rounds due to his win over Németi in this round.

Bouts

Winner	Nation	Victory Type	Loser	Nation
Axel Grönberg	Sweden	Decision, 3–0	Nikolay Belov	Soviet Union
Kalervo Rauhala	Finland	Decision, 3–0	Gyula Németi	Hungary

Points

Rank	Wrestler	Nation	Start	Earned	Total
1	Nikolay Belov	Soviet Union	0	3	3
2	Axel Grönberg	Sweden	3	1	4
3	Kalervo Rauhala	Finland	4	1	5
4	Gyula Németi	Hungary	2	3	5

=== Medal rounds ===
Grönberg's victorys over Rauhala (in round 1) and Belov (in round 2) counted for the medal round, giving him the gold medal. Rauhala and Belov faced off for the silver medal, which Rahuala won.

Bouts

Winner	Nation	Victory Type	Loser	Nation
Kalervo Rauhala	Finland	Decision, 3–0	Nikolay Belov	Soviet Union

Points

Rank	Wrestler	Nation	Wins	Losses	Start	Earned	Total
1st place, gold medalist(s)	Axel Grönberg	Sweden	2	0	4	0	4
2nd place, silver medalist(s)	Kalervo Rauhala	Finland	1	1	5	1	6
3rd place, bronze medalist(s)	Nikolay Belov	Soviet Union	0	2	3	3	6
