= Swimming at the 1952 Summer Olympics – Men's 1500 metre freestyle =

Men's 1500 metre freestyle at the Games of the XV Olympiad
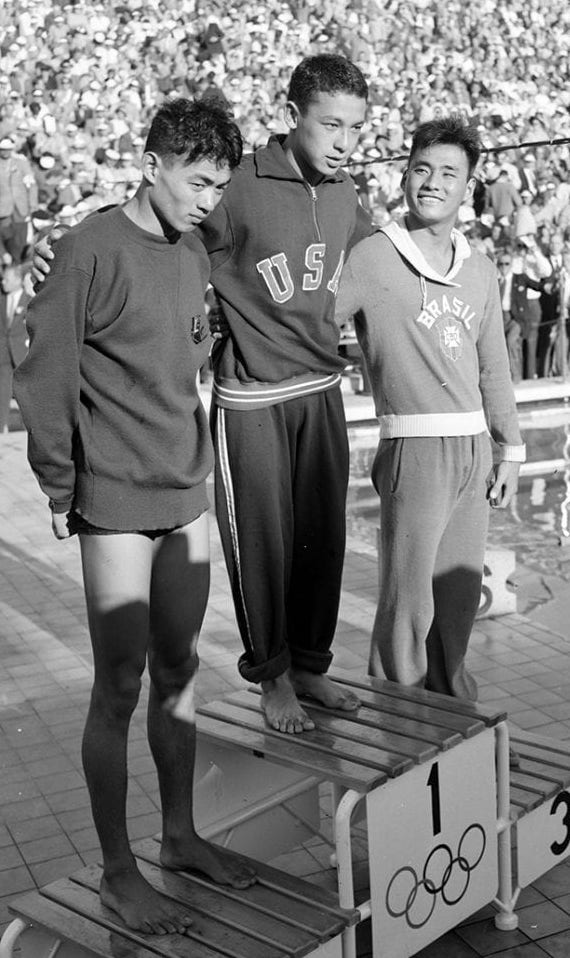
- Medal winners, from left-right: Shiro Hashizume, Ford Konno, Tetsuo Okamoto on the podium.
- Venue: Helsinki Swimming Stadium
- Date: 31 July 1952 (heats); 2 August 1952 (final)
- Competitors: 37 from 22 nations
- Winning time: 18:30.3 OR

Medalists
1st place, gold medalist(s)		Ford Konno	United States
2nd place, silver medalist(s)		Shiro Hashizume	Japan
3rd place, bronze medalist(s)		Tetsuo Okamoto	Brazil

The men's 1500 metre freestyle event at the 1952 Olympic Games took place between 31 July and 2 August, at the Swimming Stadium. This swimming event used freestyle swimming, which means that the method of the stroke is not regulated (unlike backstroke, breaststroke, and butterfly events). Nearly all swimmers use the front crawl or a variant of that stroke. Because an Olympic size swimming pool is 50 metres long, this race consists of 30 lengths of the pool.

Even though the top three swimmers were from different countries, all of them were of Japanese origin. Ford Konno was Japanese American and Tetsuo Okamoto was Japanese Brazilian.

== Results ==
=== Heats ===
Swimmers was starting in six heats. Eight of them with best times qualified to final round. Shiro Hashizume in first heat established new olympic record.

==== Heat 1 ====
Rank	Athlete	Country	Time	Notes
1	Shiro Hashizume	Japan	18:34.0	Q OR
2	Gotfryd Gremlowski	Poland	19:17.5	
3	Tonatiuh Gutiérrez	Mexico	19:18.9	
4	Sylvio dos Santos	Brazil	19:26.8	
5	Graham Johnston	South Africa	19:27.1	
6	Gerry McNamee	Canada	20:02.5	
7	Sambiao Basanung	Philippines	20:58.6	

==== Heat 2 ====
Rank	Athlete	Country	Time	Notes
1	Jimmy McLane	United States	19:09.3	Q
2	Heinz-Günther Lehmann	Germany	19:17.9	
3	Efrén Fierro	Mexico	19:55.8	
4	Garrick Agnew	Australia	20:03.8	
5	Walter Schneider	Switzerland	21:36.2	
6	Muhammad Ramzan	Pakistan	23:44.3	

==== Heat 3 ====
Rank	Athlete	Country	Time	Notes
1	Tetsuo Okamoto	Brazil	19:05.6	Q
2	György Csordás	Hungary	19:26.2	
3	Yukiyoshi Aoki	Japan	19:27.0	
4	Endel Press	Soviet Union	20:11.7	
5	Walter Bardgett	Bermuda	21:42.4	
6	Sonny Monteiro	Hong Kong	22:26.7	

==== Heat 4 ====
Rank	Athlete	Country	Time	Notes
1	Jean Boiteux	France	19:12.3	
2	Bill Woolsey	United States	19:24.6	
3	César Borja	Mexico	19:43.3	
4	Bob Sreenan	Great Britain	19:59.2	
5	Vladimir Lavrienko	Soviet Union	20:07.8	
6	Cheung Kin Man	Hong Kong	20:50.2	
7	Eduardo Priggione	Uruguay	21:11.9	

==== Heat 5 ====
Rank	Athlete	Country	Time	Notes
1	Ford Konno	United States	18:53.7	Q
2	Jo Bernardo	France	19:06.5	Q
3	Dennis Ford	South Africa	19:27.6	
4	Allen Gilchrist	Canada	20:08.3	

==== Heat 6 ====
Rank	Athlete	Country	Time	Notes
1	Peter Duncan	South Africa	19:03.5	Q
2	John Marshall	Australia	19:09.2	Q
3	Yasuo Kitamura	Japan	19:10.3	Q
4	Enrique Granados	Spain	19:45.9	
5	Geoffrey Marks	Ceylon	20:59.4	
6	Robert Cook	Bermuda	20:59.6	
7	Roar Woldum	Norway	21:19.5	

=== Final ===
Rank	Athlete	Country	Time	Notes
1	Ford Konno	United States	18:30.3	OR
2	Shiro Hashizume	Japan	18:41.4	
3	Tetsuo Okamoto	Brazil	18:51.3	
4	Jimmy McLane	United States	18:51.5	
5	Jo Bernardo	France	18:59.1	
6	Yasuo Kitamura	Japan	19:00.4	
7	Peter Duncan	South Africa	19:12.1	
8	John Marshall	Australia	19:53.4	

Key: OR = Olympic record
