= Wilfred White =

Wilfred White may refer to:

- Wilfred White (ice hockey) (1900–1948), Canadian ice hockey forward
- Wilfred White (equestrian) (1905–1995), British Olympic horse rider
