= Tsimakuridze =

Tsimakuridze (Georgian: ციმაკურიძე) is a Georgian surname. Notable people with the surname include:

- David Tsimakuridze (1925–2006), Georgian wrestler
- Giorgi Tsimakuridze (born 1983), Georgian football winger
