= Rauhala =

Rauhala is a Finnish surname. Notable people with the surname include:

- Jukka Rauhala (born 1959), Finnish Olympic wrestler
- Kalervo Rauhala (1930–2016), Finnish Olympic wrestler, uncle of Jukka and Pekka
- Leena Rauhala, Finnish politician
- Otto Rauhala (born 1995), Finnish ice hockey player
- Pekka Rauhala (born 1960), Finnish Olympic wrestler
