= Muhlis Tayfur =

Turkish wrestler (1922–2008)

Personal information
- Nationality: Turkish
- Born: 1922 Erzurum
- Died: 21 July 2008 (aged 85–86)

Sport
- Sport: Wrestling
Medal record
Men's Greco-Roman wrestling
Representing Turkey
Olympic Games
Silver medal – second place	1948 London	79 kg
European Championships
Silver medal – second place	1947 Prague	79 kg

Muhlis Tayfur (1922 – 21 July 2008) was a Turkish sport wrestler, born in Erzurum. He won a silver medal in Greco-Roman wrestling, middleweight class, at the 1948 Summer Olympics in London.
