= Pio Chirinos =

Venezuelan wrestler (born 1928)

Personal information
- Nationality: Venezuelan
- Born: 11 July 1928 Ocumare de la Costa, Venezuela

Sport
- Sport: Wrestling

Pio Chirinos (born 11 July 1928) is a Venezuelan wrestler. He competed in the men's freestyle middleweight at the 1952 Summer Olympics.
