= SK av 1909 =

Norwegian sport club founded in 1909

SP av 1909
- Full name: Sportsklubben av 1909
- Founded: 24 March 1909
- Ground: Dælenenga

Sportsklubben av 1909, often shortened as Sp-09 or Sportsklubben, is a Norwegian sports club from Oslo, founded in 1909. It has sections for amateur boxing and amateur wrestling, and has had several Olympians in its ranks.

== History ==
Logo of Fagforeningernes TIF.

It was founded on 24 March 1909 as Arbeidernes TIF ("Workers' Gymnastics and Sports Association"), and in 1916 it changed its name to Fagforeningernes TIF ("Trade Unions' Gymnastics and Sports Association"). It was the first explicit workers' sports club in Norway, founded 15 years before the creation of a nationwide Workers' Federation of Sports.

The club helped spur the creation of the Workers' Federation of Sports, because in the 1920s, the Norwegian Wrestling Federation banned fifteen members of the club for taking part in a "politicized" wrestling meet where "The Internationale" was played and red flags were flown. Nonetheless, the club was not a member of the Workers' Federation of Sports for long, as it left the Workers' Federation of Sports already in 1926. It was renamed to the more neutral SK av 1909 ("Sports Club of 1909") already in 1929. Its headquarters are at Dælenenga.

Well-known amateur wrestlers include Martin Egeberg (1924 and 1928 Olympian), Birger Nilsen (1928 Olympian), Tore Hem (1968, 1972 and 1976 Olympian), Harald Barlie (1960, 1964, 1968 and 1972 Olympian), Lars Rønningen (1984, 1988 and 1992 Olympian), Ronny Sigde (1984 and 1988 Olympian), Harald Hervig (1960 Olympian), Håkon Øverby (1968 and 1972 Olympian), Alfred Larsen (1928 Olympian), Kaare Larsen (1948 Olympian) and Ivar Stokke (1936 Olympian),

Well-known amateur boxers include Leif Hansen (1952 Olympian), Roy Askevold (1960 Olympian), Haakon Lind (1928 Olympian) and Olav Nilsen (1928 Olympian). The King's Cup in boxing has been taken by Haakon Lind in 1928, Thorstein Myhre in 1933, Sigurd Larsen in 1934, Leif Hansen in 1953 and Roy Askevold in 1959.

In athletics the club saw its heyday in the 1910s. Erling Aastad became Norwegian long jump champion in 1920 and won medals in 1918 and 1921. Victor Pettersen won silver medals in shot put with both hands (1912) and high jump (1914), and also bronze medals in shot put (1914) and decathlon (1914). Fredrik Martinsen won a silver medal in triple jump (1918) and Øivind Jensen a bronze in the pole vault (1912).
