= Alberto Bolzi =

Argentine wrestler

Personal information
- Nationality: Argentine
- Born: 18 March 1924
- Died: 7 February 2012 (aged 87)

Sport
- Sport: Wrestling

Alberto Bolzi (18 March 1924 – 7 February 2012) was an Argentine wrestler. He competed in the men's Greco-Roman middleweight at the 1948 Summer Olympics.
