= Adalberto Lepri =

Italian wrestler

Personal information
- Nationality: Italian
- Born: 20 October 1929 Terni, Italy
- Died: 5 October 2014 (aged 84) Sassari, Italy

Sport
- Sport: Wrestling

Adalberto Lepri (20 October 1929 – 5 October 2014) was an Italian wrestler. He competed in the men's freestyle middleweight at the 1952 Summer Olympics.
