= Eddie Bowey =

British wrestler (1928–2016)

Personal information
- Nationality: British (English)
- Born: Edwin Bowey; 5 January 1928 London, England
- Died: 2016 (aged 88) Enfield, London, England

Sport
- Sport: Wrestling
- Event: Middleweight
- Club: Ashdown AC, Islington

Edwin Bowey (5 January 1928 – 2016) was a British wrestler who competed for Great Britain in the 1948 Summer Olympics.

== Biography ==
At the 1948 Olympic Games in London, Bowey competed in the freestyle middleweight category.

He represented the English team at the 1950 British Empire Games in Auckland, New Zealand, finished fourth in the middleweight category. During the Games in 1950 he lived at George Crescent, Muswell Hill, London and was a horticulturist by trade.

Bowey emigrated to New Zealand the following year and worked as a lumberjack but later returned to England to work as a gardener. He had an interest in yoga since the 1940s and travelled to India in the Sixties. In 2012, he was part of a photo essay on the 1948 British Olympians.

Bowey died in Enfield, London in 2016, at the age of 88.
