= Diving at the 1952 Summer Olympics – Women's 10 metre platform =

Women's 10 metre platform at the Games of the XV Olympiad

Medalists
| 1st place, gold medalist(s) | | Pat McCormick | United States |
| 2nd place, silver medalist(s) | | Paula Jean Myers | United States |
| 3rd place, bronze medalist(s) | | Juno Stover-Irwin | United States |

The women's 10 metre platform, also called high diving, was one of four diving events on the Diving at the 1952 Summer Olympics programme.

The competition was held from both 10 and 5 metre platforms and was split into two phases on different days:

- Preliminary round (1 August) – Divers performed four voluntary dives of limited degrees of difficulty. The eight divers with the highest scores advanced to the final.
- Final (2 August) – Divers performed two voluntary dives without any limits of difficulty. The final score was the aggregate of the preliminary and final rounds' points.

== Results ==
| Rank | Diver | Nation | Preliminary | | Final | | |
| Rank | Diver | Nation | Points | Rank | Points | Rank | Total |
|---|---|---|---|---|---|---|---|
| 1st place, gold medalist(s) | Pat McCormick | United States | 51.25 | 1 | 28.12 | 1 | 79.37 |
| 2nd place, silver medalist(s) | Paula Jean Myers-Pope | United States | 44.22 | 2 | 27.41 | 2 | 71.63 |
| 3rd place, bronze medalist(s) | Juno Stover-Irwin | United States | 43.60 | 3 | 26.89 | 3 | 70.49 |
| 4 | Nicolle Pellissard | France | 43.59 | 4 | 25.49 | 4 | 69.08 |
| 5 | Ann Long | Great Britain | 43.23 | 6 | 19.96 | 5 | 63.19 |
| 6 | Tatyana Vereina | Soviet Union | 43.26 | 5 | 17.83 | 6 | 61.09 |
| 7 | Diana Spencer | Great Britain | 43.16 | 7 | 17.60 | 7 | 60.76 |
| 8 | Yevgeniya Bogdanovskaya | Soviet Union | 40.67 | 8 | 16.83 | 8 | 57.50 |
| 9 | Eva Pfarrhofer | Austria | 40.26 | 9 | did not advance | | |
| 10 | Carlota Rios | Mexico | 39.76 | 10 | did not advance | | |
| 11 | Masami Miyamoto | Japan | 36.24 | 11 | did not advance | | |
| 12 | Valerie Lloyd-Chandos | Great Britain | 35.39 | 12 | did not advance | | |
| 13 | Irma Lozano | Mexico | 33.33 | 13 | did not advance | | |
| 14 | Ninel Krutova | Soviet Union | 32.35 | 14 | did not advance | | |
| 15 | Ferdinanda Martini-Pautasso | Switzerland | 30.04 | 15 | did not advance | | |

== Sources ==
- The Organising Committee for the XV Olympiad Helsinki 1952 (1955). "The Official Report of the Organising Committee for the XV Olympiad Helsinki 1952" (PDF). The Organising Committee for the XV Olympiad Helsinki 1952. pp. p. 598. Archived from the original (pdf) on 11 April 2008.
- Herman de Wael (7 August 2001). "Diving - women's platform (Helsinki 1952)".
