= Nikolay Belov (wrestler) =

Soviet wrestler (1919–1987)

Medal record

Men's Greco-Roman wrestling

Representing the Soviet Union

Olympic Games
Bronze medal – third place	1952 Helsinki	Middleweight

European Championships
Gold medal – first place	1947	79 kg

Nikolay Grigoryevich Belov (Russian: Николай Григорьевич Белов; 23 November 1919 – 14 October 1987) was a Soviet wrestler who competed in the 1952 Summer Olympics. Belov won the bronze medal at the 1952 Summer Olympics in wrestling. He won the gold medal at the 1947 European Championship.
