= Jerzy Gryt =

Polish wrestler

Personal information
- Nationality: Polish
- Born: 24 July 1921 Katowice, Poland
- Died: 27 May 2010 (aged 88) Mikołów, Poland

Sport
- Sport: Wrestling

Jerzy Gryt (24 July 1921 – 27 May 2010) was a Polish wrestler. He competed in the men's Greco-Roman middleweight at the 1952 Summer Olympics.
