= Adil Candemir =

Turkish wrestler (1917–1989)

Personal information
- Born: 1917 Hamamözü, Sivas vilayet, Ottoman Empire
- Died: 12 January 1989 (aged 71–72)

Sport
- Country: Turkey
- Sport: Wrestling
Medal record
Men's freestyle wrestling
Representing Turkey
Olympic Games
Silver medal – second place	1948 London	79 kg

Adil Candemir (1917 – 12 January 1989) was a Turkish sport wrestler. He was born in the village of Hamamözü in what is now Amasya Province in Turkey, then the Ottoman Empire. He was of Shapsug Circassian descent. Candemir won a silver medal in freestyle wrestling, middleweight class, at the 1948 Summer Olympics in London.
