= Roy Askevold =

Norwegian boxer

Roy Askevold (1 July 1935 – 30 March 2005) was a Norwegian amateur boxer who competed in the 1960 Summer Olympics.

He was born and died in Oslo, and represented the sports club SK av 1909. He finished seventeenth in the light-middleweight division in the boxing at the 1960 Summer Olympics.
