= Min Byeong-seon =

South Korean equestrian (1919–1970)

Personal information
- Nationality: South Korean
- Born: 1919
- Died: 14 December 1970 (aged 50–51)

Sport
- Sport: Equestrian

Min Byeong-seon (Min Byung-sun, Korean: 민병선, 1919 – 14 December 1970) was a South Korean equestrian. He competed in the individual jumping event at the 1952 Summer Olympics. He died on 14 December 1970.
