= Mohamed Abdul Ramada Hussain =

Egyptian wrestler

Personal information
- Nationality: Egyptian
- Born: 5 December 1928

Sport
- Sport: Wrestling

Mohamed Abdul Ramada Hussain (born 5 December 1928) was an Egyptian wrestler. He competed in the men's freestyle middleweight at the 1952 Summer Olympics.
