= Lars Bilet =

Norwegian wrestler

Personal information
- Nationality: Norwegian
- Born: 8 January 1927 Oslo, Norway
- Died: 28 December 2016 (aged 89) Stabekk, Norway

Sport
- Sport: Wrestling

Lars Bilet (8 January 1927 – 28 December 2016) was a Norwegian wrestler. He competed in the men's Greco-Roman middleweight at the 1952 Summer Olympics.
