= León Genuth =

Argentine wrestler (1931–2022)

Personal information
- Born: 5 August 1931 Paraná, Entre Ríos, Argentina
- Died: 10 March 2022 (aged 90)

Sport
- Sport: Wrestling

León Genuth Hejt (5 August 1931 – 10 March 2022) was an Argentine wrestler. He competed in the men's freestyle middleweight at the 1952 Summer Olympics.

At the 1950 Maccabiah Games in Israel, he won the middleweight wrestling gold medal. He won the gold medal in middleweight wrestling again, at the 1953 Maccabiah Games.
