= Felix Neuhaus =

Swiss wrestler (1928–2022)

Personal information
- Nationality: Swiss
- Born: 10 April 1928
- Died: 24 January 2022 (aged 93)

Sport
- Sport: Wrestling

Felix Neuhaus (10 April 1928 – 24 January 2022) was a Swiss wrestler. He competed in the men's freestyle middleweight at the 1952 Summer Olympics.
