= Shiro Hashizume =

Japanese swimmer (1928–2023)

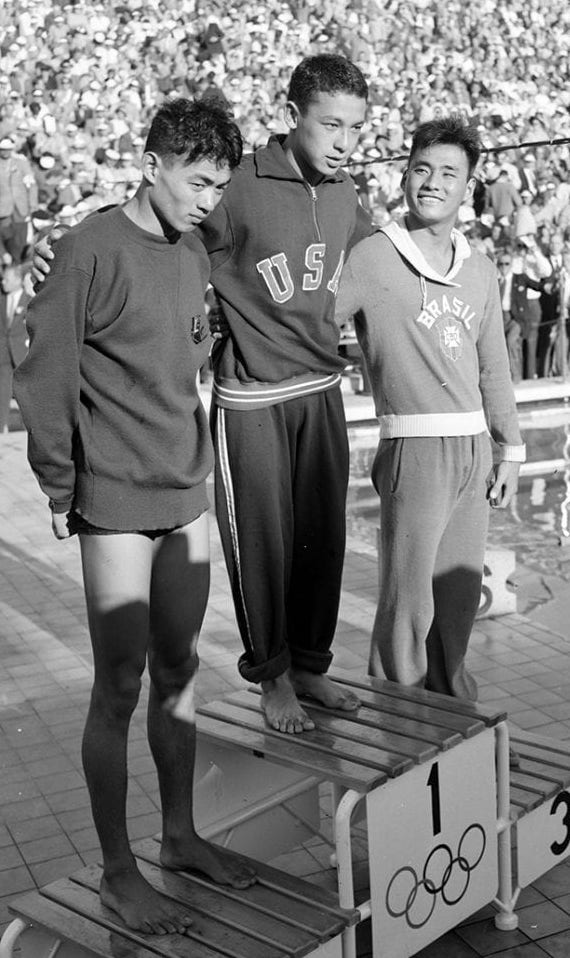
- Hashizume (left) at the 1952 Olympics

Personal information
- Born: September 20, 1928 Wakayama, Japan
- Died: March 9, 2023 (aged 94) Ōta, Tokyo, Japan
- Height: 183 cm (6 ft 0 in)
- Weight: 73 kg (161 lb)

Sport
- Sport: Swimming
- Strokes: Freestyle
Medal record
Representing Japan
Olympic Games
Silver medal – second place	1952 Helsinki	1500 m freestyle

Shiro Hashizume (橋爪四郎, Hashizume Shirō; September 20, 1928 – March 9, 2023) was a Japanese Olympic freestyle swimmer. He won the silver medal in the men's 1500m freestyle at the 1952 Summer Olympics in Helsinki, Finland. He broke the world record in the same event on August 16, 1949, clocking 18:35.7. That time was bettered the same day, however, by compatriot Hironoshin Furuhashi at the American Swimming Championships in Los Angeles, California.

== Biography ==
Born in Wakayama, Japan, Hashizume took up swimming at school. He continued swimming at Nihon University, which he entered in 1946 and graduated in 1951 with a law degree. Between 1952 and 1955 he worked for an insurance company, and then ran a swimming club in Yokohama. In 1987 he was awarded the Order of the Purple Ribbon "Shiju Hosho", and in 1992 inducted into the International Swimming Hall of Fame.

Hashizume was married and has one daughter and one son. He was a member of the Board of Education in Yokohama City. Hashizume died from prostate cancer on March 9, 2023, at the age of 94.

== See also ==
- List of members of the International Swimming Hall of Fame
- World record progression 800 metres freestyle
- World record progression 1500 metres freestyle

Records
Preceded by Tomikatsu Amano	Men's 1500 metres Freestyle; World Record Holder (Long Course); August 16, 1949	Succeeded by Hironoshin Furuhashi
