= György Gurics =

Hungarian wrestler (1929–2013)

Personal information
- Native name: Gurics György
- Born: 27 January 1929 Dunapentele, Kingdom of Hungary
- Died: 10 September 2013 (aged 84)
Medal record
Men's freestyle wrestling
Representing Hungary
Olympic Games
Bronze medal – third place	1952 Helsinki	Middleweight
World Championships
Gold medal – first place	1961 Yokohama	87 kg
Silver medal – second place	1955 Karlsruhe	79 kg
Silver medal – second place	1958 Budapest	87 kg
Bronze medal – third place	1963 Helsingborg	87 kg

György Gurics (27 January 1929 – 10 September 2013) was a Hungarian wrestler. He was born in Dunapentele in Fejér County. He was Olympic bronze medalist in Freestyle wrestling from 1952. He won a gold medal in Greco-Roman wrestling at the 1961 World Wrestling Championships. He was named Hungarian Sportsman of The Year in 1961.

Awards
Preceded by Rudolf Kárpáti	Hungarian Sportsman of The Year; 1961	Succeeded by Imre Polyák
