= Endel Press =

Estonian swimmer

Personal information
- Born: 16 February 1929 Tallinn, Estonia
- Died: 6 May 1982 (aged 53) Tallinn, then part of Estonian SSR, Soviet Union

Sport
- Sport: Swimming

Endel Press (16 February 1929 – 6 May 1982) was an Estonian swimmer who represented the Soviet Union in men's 1500 metre freestyle swimming at the 1952 Summer Olympics.
