= Émile Courtois =

Belgian wrestler

Personal information
- Nationality: Belgian
- Born: 4 July 1918 Huy, Belgium
- Died: 25 June 2005 (aged 86) Dinant, Belgium

Sport
- Sport: Wrestling

Émile Courtois (4 July 1918 – 25 June 2005) was a Belgian wrestler. He competed in the men's Greco-Roman middleweight at the 1952 Summer Olympics.
