= Toshiaki Kitai =

Japanese equestrian

Personal information
- Nationality: Japanese
- Born: 6 June 1924
- Died: 15 October 1964 (aged 40); Tokyo, Japan

Sport
- Sport: Equestrian

Toshiaki Kitai (6 June 1924 – 15 October 1964) was a Japanese equestrian. He competed in the individual jumping event at the 1952 Summer Olympics.
