= Ferdinanda Martini-Pautasso =

Swiss diver (1923–1993)

Personal information
- Nationality: Italian-Swiss
- Born: 27 August 1923; Milan, Kingdom of Italy
- Died: 21 January 1993 (aged 69); Milan, Italy

Sport
- Sport: Diving

Ferdinanda Martini-Pautasso (27 August 1923 – 21 January 1993) was an Italian-Swiss diver. After a number of national titles in Italy in 1940s, she competed in the women's 10 metre platform event at the 1952 Summer Olympics for Switzerland.
