= Axel Grönberg =

Swedish Greco-Roman wrestler

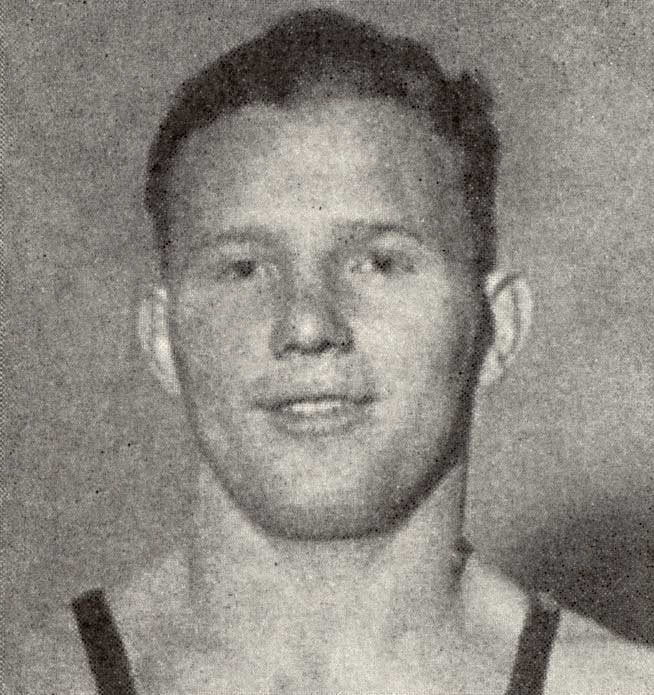

Personal information
- Full name: Rolf Axel Ejnar Grönberg
- Nickname: "Acke"
- Born: 9 May 1918 Norberg, Sweden
- Died: 23 April 1988 (aged 69) Stockholm, Sweden

Sport
- Sport: Greco-Roman wrestling
- Club: BK Athén, Stockholm
Medal record
Men's Greco-Roman wrestling
Representing Sweden
Olympic Games
Gold medal – first place	1948 London	Middleweight
Gold medal – first place	1952 Helsinki	Middleweight
World Championships
Gold medal – first place	1950 Stockholm	Middleweight
Silver medal – second place	1953 Naples	Middleweight
European Championships
Silver medal – second place	1949 Istanbul	Middleweight
Bronze medal – third place	1946 Stockholm	Middleweight
Bronze medal – third place	1947 Prague	Middleweight

Rolf Axel "Acke" Ejnar Grönberg (9 May 1918 – 23 April 1988) was a Swedish Greco-Roman wrestler, who won the Greco-Roman middleweight division at the 1948 and 1952 Summer Olympics.

Grönberg was raised in Norberg, but moved to Stockholm as a teenager. There he worked as a plumber and masseur, and started wrestling following his elder brothers Fritz and Harald. Besides his Olympic medals he won a world title in 1950, three European Championship medals, as well as 16 national titles between 1944 and 1958.
