= Yasuo Kitamura =

Japanese swimmer

Personal information
- Born: 14 October 1932 (age 94)

Sport
- Sport: Swimming

Yasuo Kitamura (北村 康雄, Kitamura Yasuo; born 14 October 1932) is a Japanese former swimmer. He competed in the men's 1500 metre freestyle at the 1952 Summer Olympics.
