= Augustus Everaerts =

Belgian wrestler (born 1929)

Personal information
- Nationality: Belgian
- Born: 2 February 1929 (age 97) Burcht, Belgium

Sport
- Sport: Wrestling

Augustus Everaerts (born 2 February 1929) is a Belgian former wrestler. He competed in the men's freestyle middleweight at the 1952 Summer Olympics.
