= Erik Lindén (wrestler) =

Swedish wrestler (1911–1992)

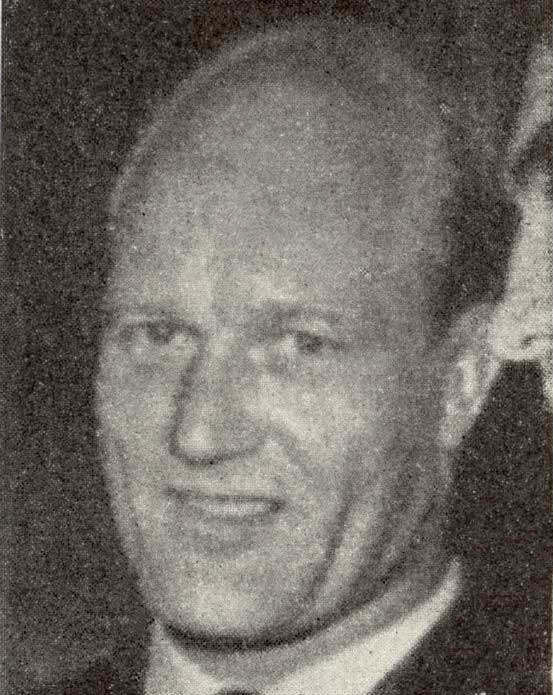

Personal information
- Born: 8 November 1911 Malmö, Sweden
- Died: 22 December 1992 (aged 81) Stockholm, Sweden

Sport
- Sport: Freestyle wrestling
- Club: Brandkårens IK, Stockholm
Medal record
Men's freestyle wrestling
Representing Sweden
Olympic Games
Bronze medal – third place	1948 London	Middleweight

Karl Erik Nils Lindén (8 November 1911 – 22 December 1992) was a Swedish freestyle wrestler who won a bronze medal in the middleweight division at the 1948 Summer Olympics in London.
