= Juho Kinnunen (wrestler) =

Finnish wrestler (1909–1972)

Personal information
- Nationality: Finnish
- Born: 31 October 1909 Kuopion maalaiskunta, Finland
- Died: 8 July 1972 (aged 62) Budapest, Hungary

Sport
- Sport: Wrestling

Juho Kinnunen (31 October 1909 – 8 July 1972) was a Finnish wrestler. He competed in the men's Greco-Roman middleweight at the 1948 Summer Olympics.
