= Klaas de Groot (wrestler) =

Dutch wrestler (1919–1994)

Personal information
- Nationality: Dutch
- Born: 11 May 1919 Wormer, Netherlands
- Died: 24 February 1994 (aged 74) Zaanstad, Netherlands

Sport
- Sport: Wrestling

Klaas de Groot (11 May 1919 – 24 February 1994) was a Dutch wrestler. He competed in the men's Greco-Roman middleweight at the 1948 Summer Olympics.
