= Argentino Molinuevo Jr. =

Argentine equestrian

Personal information
- Full name: Argentino Macedonio Molinuevo Jr.
- Nationality: Argentine
- Born: 7 February 1945 (age 80)

Sport
- Sport: Equestrian

Argentino Macedonio Molinuevo Jr. (born 7 February 1945) is an Argentine equestrian. He competed at the 1968 Summer Olympics, the 1972 Summer Olympics and the 1976 Summer Olympics. He is the son of equestrian Argentino Molinuevo Sr.
