= Diana Spencer (diver) =

British diver (born 1934)

Personal information
- Full name: Diana May Spencer
- Nationality: British
- Born: 31 May 1934 (age 91) British India

Sport
- Sport: Diving

Diana May Spencer (born 31 May 1934) is a British diver. She competed in the women's 10 metre platform event at the 1952 Summer Olympics.

== Career ==
Born in India, she initially excelled as a swimmer, becoming junior champion of Western India. She moved to the United Kingdom prior to her Olympic appearance, living in Ruislip and attending Bishopshalt School, going on to work as a cardiographer at Whittington Hospital while training to be a physiotherapist.

She represented the Mermaid Swimming Club domestically, winning the Middlesex high-board championship in 1952. She went on to win the Olympic trials to get a place in the British diving team at the games. She reached the final of the Olympic 10m board event, finishing in 7th place. She finished in third place in the British high-board championship the same year.

She finished second in the national championship in 1953.
