= Haydar Zafer =

Turkish wrestler (1916–1994)

Personal information
- Nationality: Turkish
- Born: 1 January 1916 Bolu, Ottoman Empire
- Died: 28 June 1994 (aged 78) Düzce, Turkey

Sport
- Sport: Wrestling
- Event: Freestyle
- Coached by: Nurettin Zafer
Medal record
Men's freestyle wrestling
Representing Turkey
World Championships
Gold medal – first place	1951 Helsinki	Middleweight

Haydar Zafer (1 January 1916 – 28 June 1994) was a Turkish wrestler. He competed in the men's freestyle middleweight at the 1952 Summer Olympics.

== Wrestling career ==
Haydar Zafer grew up in Bolu and started Turkish oil wrestling there as a teenager. After 1945, he also pursued Olympic wrestling. He preferred freestyle, but also wrestled in the Greco-Roman style. In 1949 he joined the Turkish national team, where he was coached by Nuri Boytorun. In 1951 he competed in his first international championship in Helsinki and immediately became world champion in the middleweight, free style. Since at that time there were much fewer international title fights than today, Haydar Zafer could also participate in only three international championships.

At the 1952 Olympic Games in Helsinki, he could not prevail in the middleweight division. After three victories, he lost on points to the Iranian Gholam Reza Takhti, whom he had defeated in the 1951 world championship, and finished 5th.

At the 1955 World Championships in Karlsruhe, he competed in the Greco-Roman style in the light heavyweight division, but did not get beyond 11th place.

After leaving active wrestling, he worked as a coach at Haliç Wrestling Club. He was married and had three children.
