= Irma Lozano (diver) =

Mexican diver

Personal information
- Full name: Irma Lozano Gallo
- Nationality: Mexican
- Born: 9 March 1933 (age 92)

Sport
- Sport: Diving

Irma Lozano Gallo (Note: In this Spanish name, the first or paternal surname is Lozano and the second or maternal family name is Gallo.) (born 9 March 1933) is a Mexican diver. She competed in the women's 10 metre platform event at the 1952 Summer Olympics.
