= Óscar Cristi =

Chilean equestrian and police officer

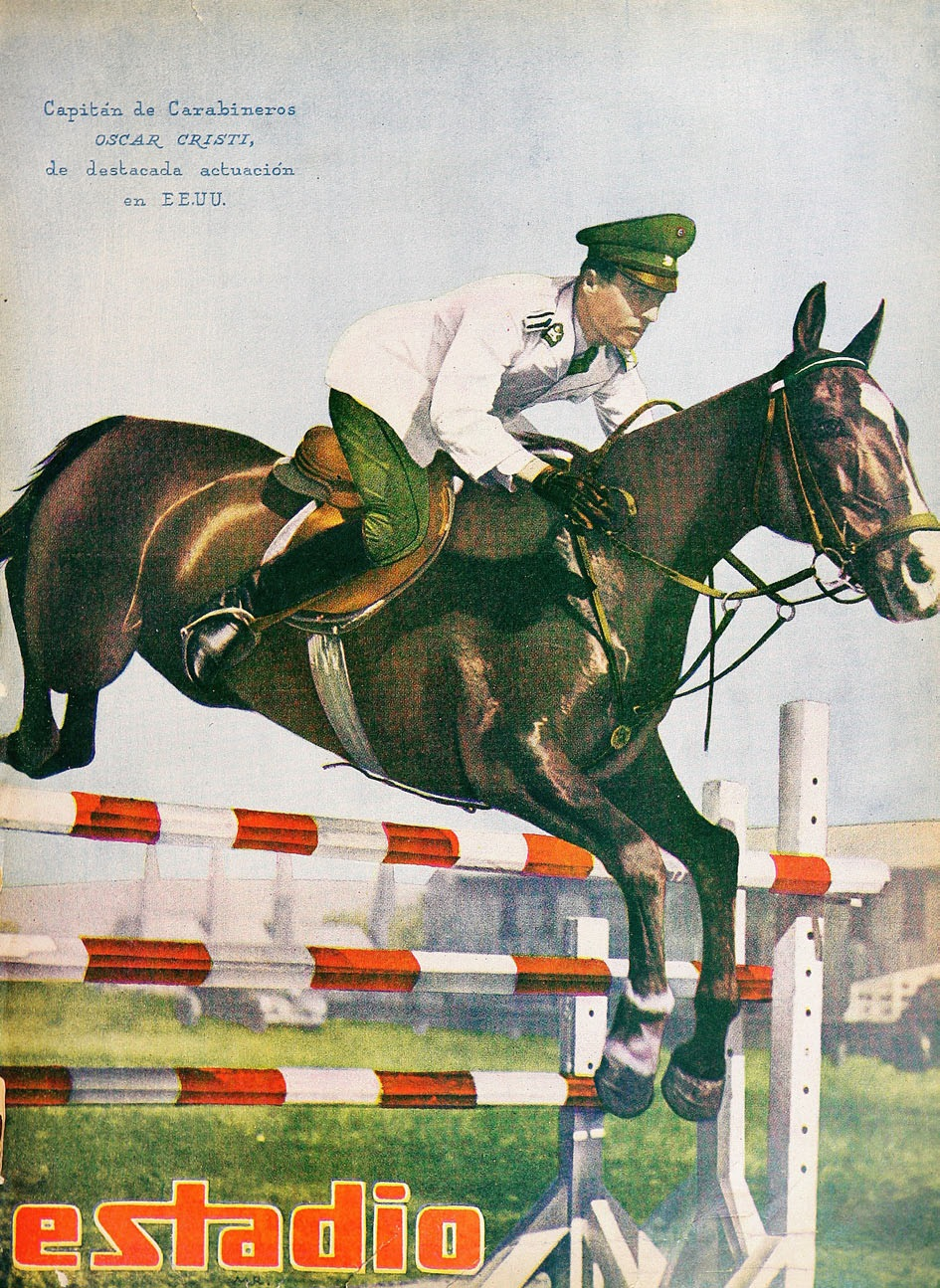

Personal information
- Born: June 29, 1916
- Died: March 25, 1965 (aged 48)

Sport
- Sport: Horse riding
- Event: Show jumping
Medal record
Representing Chile
Olympic Games
Silver medal – second place	1952 Helsinki	Individual jumping
Silver medal – second place	1952 Helsinki	Team jumping
Pan American Games
Bronze medal – third place	1955 Mexico City	Team jumping
Bronze medal – third place	1959 Chicago	Team jumping

Óscar Cristi Gallo (June 29, 1916 – March 25, 1965) was a Chilean police officer and a successful show jumping rider from the late 1940s until the late 1960s.

In 1952 he won both the individual and team Olympic silver medals in the jumping competition of the equestrian event. He was the first Chilean athlete to win two Olympic medals. The Chilean team jumping in 1952 was Óscar Cristi on Bambi, César Mendoza on Pillán and Ricardo Echeverría on Lindo Peal.

On March 25, 1965, Óscar Cristi had a fatal car accident as he was about to retire from the post of Deputy Director-General of the Carabineros. In 1992 the riding school in Santiago operated by the Carabineros was renamed in his honor.
