= Bruce Arthur =

Australian wrestler (1921–1998)

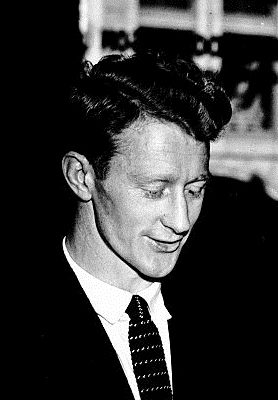
- Arthur in 1948

Personal information
- Full name: Richard Bruce Arthur
- Born: 2 November 1921 Melbourne, Victoria, Australia
- Died: 22 March 1998 (aged 76) Dunk Island, Queensland, Australia

Sport
- Sport: Freestyle wrestling
Medal record
Representing Australia
British Empire Games
| Silver medal – second place | 1950 Auckland | Middleweight |

Richard Bruce Arthur (2 November 1921 – 22 March 1998) was an Australian freestyle wrestler who won a silver medal in the middleweight division at the 1950 British Empire Games; he finished fourth in 1954. He competed at the 1948 Summer Olympics, but was eliminated after three bouts.

In the 1950s, Arthur joined the artist colony at Dunmoochin in rural Victoria owned by Clifton Pugh where he learnt to weave and became fascinated by the process. After heading to far north Queensland, Arthur, with wife and fellow artist-weaver, Deanna Conti, established a tapestry atelier, Brudea Studio, on Timana Island, off the Cassowary Coast in Rockingham Bay. They leased the island and initially sold work to tourists before working on commission with other Australian artists. In the early days of the Atelier, his main role was making looms and the dyeing of wool. Arthur left Timana, relocating in 1973 to Dunk Island where he established the Dunk Island Tapestry Atelier.

Arthur remained on the island until his death in 1998.
