= Paavo Sepponen =

Finnish wrestler (1923–1998)

Personal information
- Nationality: Finnish
- Born: 30 October 1923; Alavus, Finland
- Died: 6 November 1998 (aged 75); Nurmo, Finland

Sport
- Sport: Wrestling

Paavo Sepponen (30 October 1923 – 6 November 1998) was a Finnish wrestler. He competed at the 1948 Summer Olympics and the 1952 Summer Olympics.
