= Eduardo Priggione =

Uruguayan swimmer (born 1934)

Personal information
- Full name: Eduardo Alberto Priggione Presa
- Born: 23 February 1934 Montevideo, Uruguay
- Died: 22 February 1999 (aged 64)

Sport
- Sport: Swimming

Eduardo Alberto Priggione Presa (23 February 1934 – 22 February 1999) was a Uruguayan swimmer. He competed in two events at the 1952 Summer Olympics.
