= Ali Özdemir =

Turkish wrestler (1920–2009)

Personal information
- Nationality: Turkish
- Born: 1920
- Died: 22 April 2009 (aged 88–89) İzmir, Turkey

Sport
- Sport: Wrestling

Ali Özdemir (1920 – 22 April 2009) was a Turkish wrestler. He competed at the 1948 Summer Olympics and the 1952 Summer Olympics.
