= Rodolfo Perea =

Mexican diver (1929–1997)

Personal information
- Full name: Rodolfo Perea Cifuentes
- Born: 5 October 1929 Mexico City, Mexico
- Died: 13 March 1997 (aged 67) Mexico City, Mexico

Sport
- Sport: Diving
Medal record
Representing Mexico
Central American and Caribbean Games
Bronze medal – third place	1950 Guatemala City	3m springboard
Bronze medal – third place	1950 Guatemala City	10m platform
Bronze medal – third place	1954 Mexico City	10m platform

Rodolfo Perea Cifuentes (Note: In this Spanish name, the first or paternal surname is Perea and the second or maternal family name is Cifuentes.) (5 October 1929 – 13 March 1997) was a Mexican diver. He competed in two events at the 1952 Summer Olympics. Perea died in Mexico City on 13 March 1997, at the age of 67.
