= Kaare Larsen =

Norwegian sport wrestler

Kaare Oliver Larsen (10 October 1914 – 26 April 1980) was a Norwegian sport wrestler who competed in the 1948 Summer Olympics.

He was born in Østre Aker, and represented the sports club SK av 1909. He participated in the middleweight class in wrestling at the 1948 Summer Olympics, where he finished fifth overall. He attributed his success partially to the rivalry he had with Svetskan born Ulrich Ulrichson, which lasted for several decades.
