= David Tsimakuridze =

Georgian freestyle wrestler

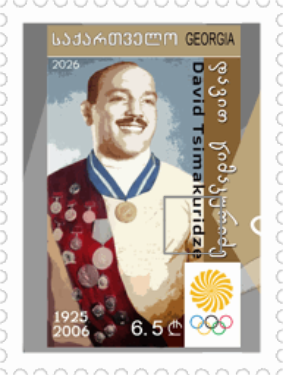
- Tsimakuridze on a 2026 stamp of Georgia

Personal information
- Born: 26 March 1925 Poti, Georgian SSR, Soviet Union
- Died: 9 May 2006 (aged 81) Tbilisi, Georgia

Sport
- Sport: Freestyle wrestling
- Club: Iskra Tbilisi
Medal record
Men's freestyle wrestling
Representing the Soviet Union
Olympic Games
Gold medal – first place	1952 Helsinki	79 kg

David Tsimakuridze (29 March 1925 – 9 May 2006) was a Georgian middleweight freestyle wrestler. He won an Olympic gold medal in 1952, becoming the first Olympic champion from Georgia. Domestically he won the Soviet title in freestyle (1945–1947, 1949–1952) and Greco-Roman wrestling (1947 and 1948). After retiring from competitions he worked as a coach, and prepared the national team for the 1956 Olympics.
