= Alberto Capilla =

Mexican diver

Personal information
- Full name: Alberto Capilla Pérez
- Nationality: Mexican
- Born: 12 December 1926 Paris, France
- Died: 14 January 2003 (aged 76) Cuauhtémoc, Mexico

Sport
- Sport: Diving

Alberto Capilla Pérez (Note: In this Spanish name, the first or paternal surname is Capilla and the second or maternal family name is Pérez.) (12 December 1926 – 14 January 2003) was a Mexican diver. He competed at the 1952 Summer Olympics and the 1956 Summer Olympics.
