= Kalervo Rauhala =

Finnish wrestler (1930–2016)

Medal record

Representing Finland

Men's Greco-Roman wrestling

Olympic Games
Silver medal – second place	1952 Helsinki	Middleweight

Kalervo Rauhala (October 19, 1930, Ylistaro – September 21, 2016) was a Finnish wrestler and Olympic medalist in Greco-Roman wrestling.

== Olympics ==
Rauhala competed at the 1952 Summer Olympics in Helsinki where he received a silver medal in Greco-Roman wrestling, the middleweight class.
