= Ercole Gallegati =

Italian wrestler (1911–1990)

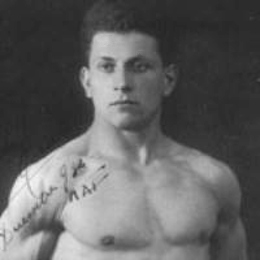

Personal information
- Born: 21 November 1911 Faenza, Italy
- Died: 19 August 1990 (aged 78) Castel San Pietro Terme, Italy

Sport
- Sport: Greco-Roman wrestling
Medal record
Men's Greco-Roman wrestling
Representing Italy
Olympic Games
Bronze medal – third place	1932 Los Angeles	72 kg
Bronze medal – third place	1948 London	79 kg
European Championships
Bronze medal – third place	1934 Rome	72 kg

Ercole Gallegati (21 November 1911 – 19 August 1990) was an Italian wrestler. He won bronze medals in Greco-Roman wrestling at the 1932 and 1948 Olympics and 1934 European Championships. He also competed in the 1936 Olympics, both in freestyle and Greco-Roman wrestling, and at the 1952 Olympics. Domestically he won 20 Italian titles in Greco-Roman and 11 in freestyle wrestling between 1931 and 1956. After retiring from competitions he became a wrestling coach and a member of the Faenza city council.
