= Gheorghe Antohi =

Romanian equestrian

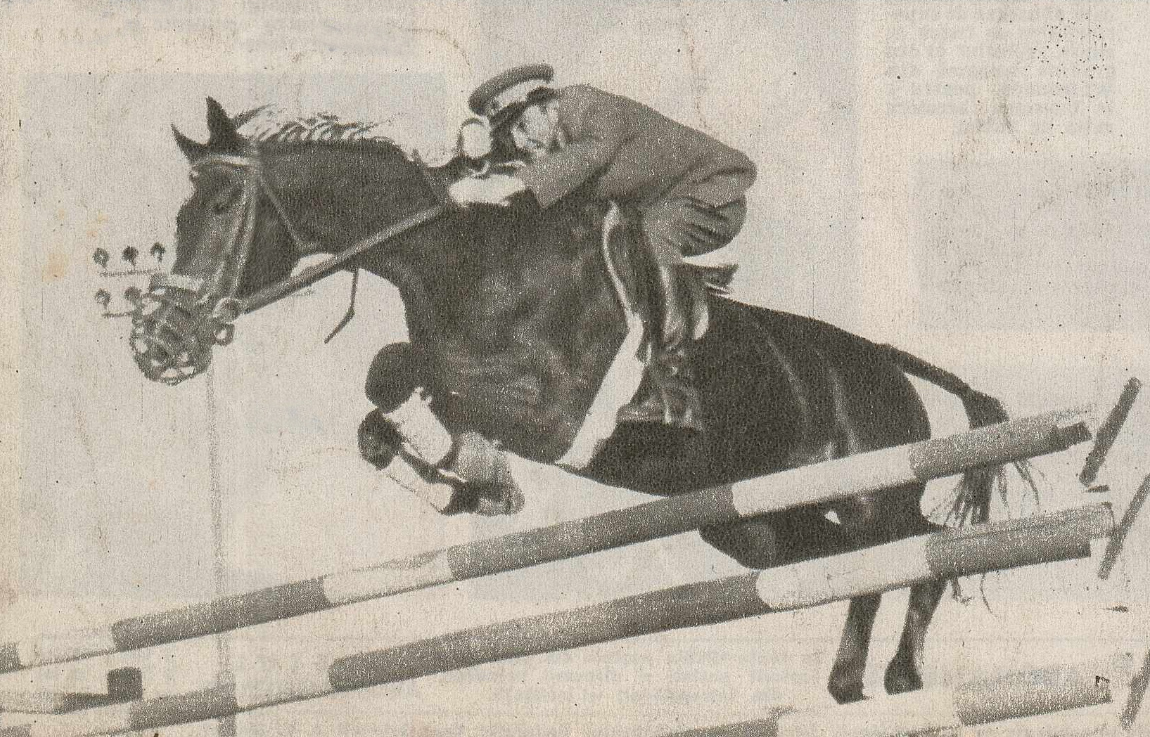

Personal information
- Nationality: Romanian
- Born: 12 March 1922; Târgoviște, Romania
- Died: 1997 (aged 74–75)

Sport
- Sport: Equestrian

Gheorghe Antohi (12 March 1922 – 1997) was a Romanian equestrian. He competed in two events at the 1952 Summer Olympics.
