= Hans-Hermann Evers =

German equestrian

Personal information
- Nationality: German
- Born: 22 October 1930; Friedrichskoog, Germany
- Died: 31 May 2017 (aged 86)

Sport
- Sport: Equestrian

Hans-Hermann Evers (22 October 1930 – 31 May 2017) was a German equestrian. He competed in two events at the 1952 Summer Olympics.
