= César Borja =

Mexican swimmer (born 1934)

Personal information
- Born: September 21, 1934 (age 91)

Sport
- Sport: Swimming
Medal record
Representing Mexico
Central American and Caribbean Games
Gold medal – first place	1954 Mexico City	4x200m freestyle relay

César Borja Pineda (born 21 September 1934) is a Mexican former freestyle swimmer who competed in the 1948 Summer Olympics and in the 1952 Summer Olympics.
