= Calie Reitz =

South African wrestler (1927–2016)

Personal information
- Nationality: South African
- Born: 20 February 1927 Pretoria, South Africa
- Died: 26 August 2016 (aged 89) Pretoria, South Africa

Sport
- Sport: Wrestling

Carel Godfried Reitz (20 February 1927 – 26 August 2016), known as Calie, was a South African wrestler. He competed at the 1948 Summer Olympics and the 1952 Summer Olympics.
