= Henrik Lavonius =

Finnish equestrian

Personal information
- Nationality: Finnish
- Born: 19 January 1915; Tampere, Finland
- Died: 31 January 1996 (aged 81); Helsinki, Finland

Sport
- Sport: Equestrian

Henrik Lavonius (19 January 1915 – 31 January 1996) was a Finnish equestrian. He competed in two events at the 1952 Summer Olympics.
