= Alvaro de Toledo =

Brazilian equestrian

Personal information
- Nationality: Brazilian
- Born: 17 September 1921
- Died: 5 January 1997 (aged 75) São Paulo, Brazil

Sport
- Sport: Equestrian

Alvaro de Toledo (17 September 1921 – 5 January 1997) was a Brazilian equestrian. He competed in two events at the 1952 Summer Olympics.
