= Viktor Jansson (equestrian) =

Finnish equestrian (1919–2006)

Personal information
- Nationality: Finnish
- Born: 31 December 1919 Viipuri, Finland
- Died: 25 September 2006 (aged 86) Helsinki, Finland

Sport
- Sport: Equestrian

Viktor Jansson (31 December 1919 – 25 September 2006) was a Finnish equestrian. He competed in two events at the 1952 Summer Olympics.
