= Mikhail Vlasov =

Soviet equestrian (born 1919)

Mikhail Matveyevich Vlasov
Personal information
- Nationality: Soviet
- Born: 1919

Sport
- Sport: Equestrian

Mikhail Vlasov (born 1919, date of death unknown) was a Soviet equestrian. He competed in two events at the 1952 Summer Olympics. Vlasov is deceased.
