= Ion Jipa =

Romanian equestrian (1925–1996)

Personal information
- Nationality: Romanian
- Born: 9 March 1925 Galați, Romania
- Died: 22 June 1996 (aged 71) Piatra Neamț, Romania

Sport
- Sport: Equestrian

Ion Jipa (9 March 1925 – 22 June 1996) was a Romanian equestrian. He competed in two events at the 1952 Summer Olympics. Jipa died in Piatra Neamț on 22 June 1996, at the age of 71.
