= Ion Constantin =

Romanian equestrian

Personal information
- Nationality: Romanian
- Born: 23 August 1929

Sport
- Sport: Equestrian

Ion Constantin (born 23 August 1929) was a Romanian equestrian. He competed in two events at the 1952 Summer Olympics.
