= André Brunaud =

French wrestler

Personal information
- Nationality: French
- Born: 9 February 1915; Saint-Marcellin, France
- Died: 24 May 2007 (aged 92); Conches-en-Ouche, France

Sport
- Sport: Wrestling

André Alfred Brunaud (9 February 1915 – 24 May 2007) was a French wrestler. He competed at the 1948 Summer Olympics and the 1952 Summer Olympics.
