= Gyula Németi =

Hungarian wrestler (1921–1970)

Personal information
- Nationality: Hungarian
- Born: 30 June 1921; Debrecen, Hungary
- Died: 5 June 1970 (aged 48); Debrecen, Hungary

Sport
- Sport: Wrestling

Gyula Németi (30 June 1921 – 5 June 1970) was a Hungarian wrestler. He competed at the 1948 Summer Olympics and the 1952 Summer Olympics.
