= João Lopes (equestrian) =

Portuguese equestrian

Personal information
- Nationality: Portuguese
- Born: 20 October 1919; Maputo, Mozambique
- Died: 24 June 2015 (aged 95); Lisbon, Portugal

Sport
- Sport: Equestrian

João Lopes (20 October 1919 – 24 June 2015) was a Portuguese equestrian. He competed at the 1952 Summer Olympics and the 1960 Summer Olympics.
