= Gamal Haress =

Egyptian equestrian

Personal information
- Nationality: Egyptian
- Born: 12 August 1925 Cairo, Egypt
- Died: March 2019

Sport
- Sport: Equestrian

Gamal Haress (12 August 1925 – March 2019) was an Egyptian equestrian. He competed at the 1952 Summer Olympics, the 1956 Summer Olympics and the 1960 Summer Olympics.
