= Gunnar Palm (equestrian) =

Swedish equestrian

Personal information
- Nationality: Swedish
- Born: 22 February 1915; Uppsala, Sweden
- Died: 26 October 1994 (aged 79); Svenljunga, Sweden

Sport
- Sport: Equestrian

Gunnar Palm (22 February 1915 – 26 October 1994) was a Swedish equestrian. He competed in two events at the 1952 Summer Olympics.
