= Börje Jeppson =

Swedish equestrian

Personal information
- Nationality: Swedish
- Born: 7 November 1915; Lund, Sweden
- Died: 20 September 1979 (aged 63); Lund, Sweden

Sport
- Sport: Equestrian

Börje Jeppson (7 November 1915 – 20 September 1979) was a Swedish equestrian. He competed in two events at the 1952 Summer Olympics.
