= Manuel Ordovás =

Spanish equestrian

Personal information
- Full name: Manuel Ordovás González
- Nationality: Spanish
- Born: 9 December 1912
- Died: 16 April 1999 (aged 86) Madrid, Spain

Sport
- Sport: Equestrian

Manuel Ordovás González (Note: In this Spanish name, the first or paternal surname is Ordovás and the second or maternal family name is González.) (9 December 1912 – 16 April 1999) was a Spanish equestrian. He competed in two events at the 1952 Summer Olympics.
