= Eloy de Menezes =

Brazilian equestrian (1910–1995)

Personal information
- Full name: Eloy Massey Oliveira de Menezes
- Nationality: Brazilian
- Born: 24 November 1910
- Died: 13 December 1995 (aged 85); Rio de Janeiro, Brazil

Sport
- Sport: Equestrian

Eloy de Menezes (24 November 1910 – 13 December 1995) was a Brazilian equestrian. He competed at the 1948, 1952 and 1956 Summer Olympics.
