= Abbas Ahmad =

Egyptian wrestler

Personal information
- Nationality: Egyptian
- Born: Cairo, Egypt

Sport
- Sport: Wrestling

Abbas Ahmad was an Egyptian wrestler. He competed in both Greco-Roman and Freestyle formats of wrestling as a middle weight at the 1948 Summer Olympics.
