= José Carvalhosa =

Portuguese equestrian

Personal information
- Nationality: Portuguese
- Born: 1 March 1911
- Died: 14 May 1991 (aged 80)

Sport
- Sport: Equestrian

José Carvalhosa (1 March 1911 – 14 May 1991) was a Portuguese equestrian. He competed in two events at the 1952 Summer Olympics.
