= Sergio Dellachá =

Argentine equestrian

Personal information
- Nationality: Argentine
- Born: 11 November 1925; Milan, Italy
- Died: 9 September 2006 (aged 80); Buenos Aires, Argentina

Sport
- Sport: Equestrian

Sergio Dellachá (11 November 1925 – 9 September 2006) was an Argentine equestrian. He competed in two events at the 1952 Summer Olympics.
