= Bertrand Pernot du Breuil =

French equestrian

Personal information
- Nationality: French
- Born: 3 November 1926 Saumur, France
- Died: 24 March 2011 (aged 84)

Sport
- Sport: Equestrian

Bertrand Pernot du Breuil (3 November 1926 – 24 March 2011) was a French equestrian. He competed in two events at the 1952 Summer Olympics.
