= Carl-Jan Hamilton =

Swedish equestrian

Personal information
- Nationality: Swedish
- Born: 3 July 1916; Stockholm, Sweden
- Died: 24 June 2007 (aged 90); Åtvidaberg, Sweden

Sport
- Sport: Equestrian

Carl-Jan Hamilton (3 July 1916 – 24 June 2007) was a Swedish equestrian. He competed in two events at the 1952 Summer Olympics.
