= Gavriil Budyonny =

Soviet equestrian (born 1917)

Personal information
- Nationality: Soviet
- Born: 1917

Sport
- Sport: Equestrian

Gavriil Budyonny (born 1917, date of death unknown) was a Soviet equestrian. He competed in two events at the 1952 Summer Olympics. Budyonny is deceased.
