= Jean-Baptiste Benoy =

Belgian wrestler

Personal information
- Nationality: Belgian
- Born: 13 August 1926
- Died: 20 June 1980 (aged 53)

Sport
- Sport: Wrestling

Jean-Baptiste Benoy (13 August 1926 – 20 June 1980) was a Belgian wrestler. He competed in two events at the 1948 Summer Olympics.
