= Georg Höltig =

German equestrian

Personal information
- Nationality: German
- Born: 26 November 1912; Niedersachsen, Germany
- Died: 24 December 1991 (aged 79); Halle, Germany

Sport
- Sport: Equestrian

Georg Höltig (26 November 1912 – 24 December 1991) was a German equestrian. He competed in two events at the 1952 Summer Olympics.
