= Mohamed Khairy (equestrian) =

Egyptian equestrian (born 1919)

Personal information
- Full name: Mohamed Hussain Khairy
- Nationality: Egyptian
- Born: 1919

Sport
- Sport: Equestrian

Mohamed Khairy (born 1919, date of death unknown) was an Egyptian equestrian. He competed in two events at the 1952 Summer Olympics. These events were Team Jumping and Individual Jumping. Khairy is deceased.
