= Anton Vogel =

Austrian wrestler 1913–1971

Personal information
- Nationality: Austrian
- Born: 21 July 1913; Lustenau, Austria
- Died: 27 November 1971 (aged 58); Hard, Austria

Sport
- Sport: Wrestling

Anton Vogel (21 July 1913 – 27 November 1971) was an Austrian wrestler. He competed in two events at the 1948 Summer Olympics.
