= Efrén Fierro =

Mexican swimmer (1929–2007)

Personal information
- Born: 26 May 1929
- Died: 2007 (aged 77–78)

Sport
- Sport: Swimming
Medal record
Representing Mexico
Pan American Games
Bronze medal – third place	1951 Buenos Aires	1500m freestyle

Efrén Fierro (26 May 1929 – 2007) was a Mexican freestyle swimmer. He competed in two events at the 1952 Summer Olympics.
