= Argentino Molinuevo Sr. =

Argentine equestrian

Personal information
- Full name: Argentino Macedonio Molinuevo Sr.
- Born: 20 May 1911 Buenos Aires, Argentina
- Died: 1 June 2006 (aged 95) Buenos Aires, Argentina
- Military career
- Allegiance: Argentina
- Branch: Argentine Army
- Rank: Colonel

Sport
- Sport: Equestrian
Medal record
Equestrian
Representing Argentina
Pan American Games
Silver medal – second place	1951 Buenos Aires	Team jumping
Silver medal – second place	1955 Mexico City	Team jumping

Argentino Macedonio Molinuevo Sr. (20 May 1911 – 1 June 2006) was an Argentine equestrian. He competed in two events at the 1952 Summer Olympics. His son is equestrian Argentino Molinuevo Jr.

Molinuevo, as vice president, served as acting president of the Argentine Equestrian Federation in the years 1975-1977. He also served as President of the Club Hípico Argentino for 8 years in the 1970s.

Molinuevo attended the National Military College (Spanish: Colegio Militar de la Nación) where he graduated in 1930 as a second lieutenant as part of the 60th Class. As a major, and later lieutenant colonel, he served as Director of the Cavalry School in the years 1951-1955. He achieved the rank of colonel before retiring.
