= Roberto Viñals =

Mexican equestrian

Personal information
- Nationality: Mexican
- Born: Miguel Hidalgo, Mexico City, Mexico
- Died: 28 March 1986 Miguel Hidalgo, Mexico City, Mexico

Sport
- Sport: Equestrian
Medal record
Equestrian
Representing Mexico
Pan American Games
Gold medal – first place	1955 Mexico City	Individual jumping
Gold medal – first place	1955 Mexico City	Team jumping
Bronze medal – third place	1951 Buenos Aires	Team jumping

Roberto Viñals Contreras (date of birth unknown; died 28 March 1986) was a Mexican equestrian. He competed in two events at the 1952 Summer Olympics.
