= Gustav Gocke =

German wrestler

Personal information
- Nationality: German
- Born: 17 February 1919; Dortmund, Germany
- Died: 9 February 2005 (aged 85); Dortmund, Germany

Sport
- Sport: Wrestling

Gustav Gocke (17 February 1919 – 9 February 2005) was a German wrestler. He competed in two events at the 1952 Summer Olympics.
