= Ricardo Echeverría =

Chilean equestrian

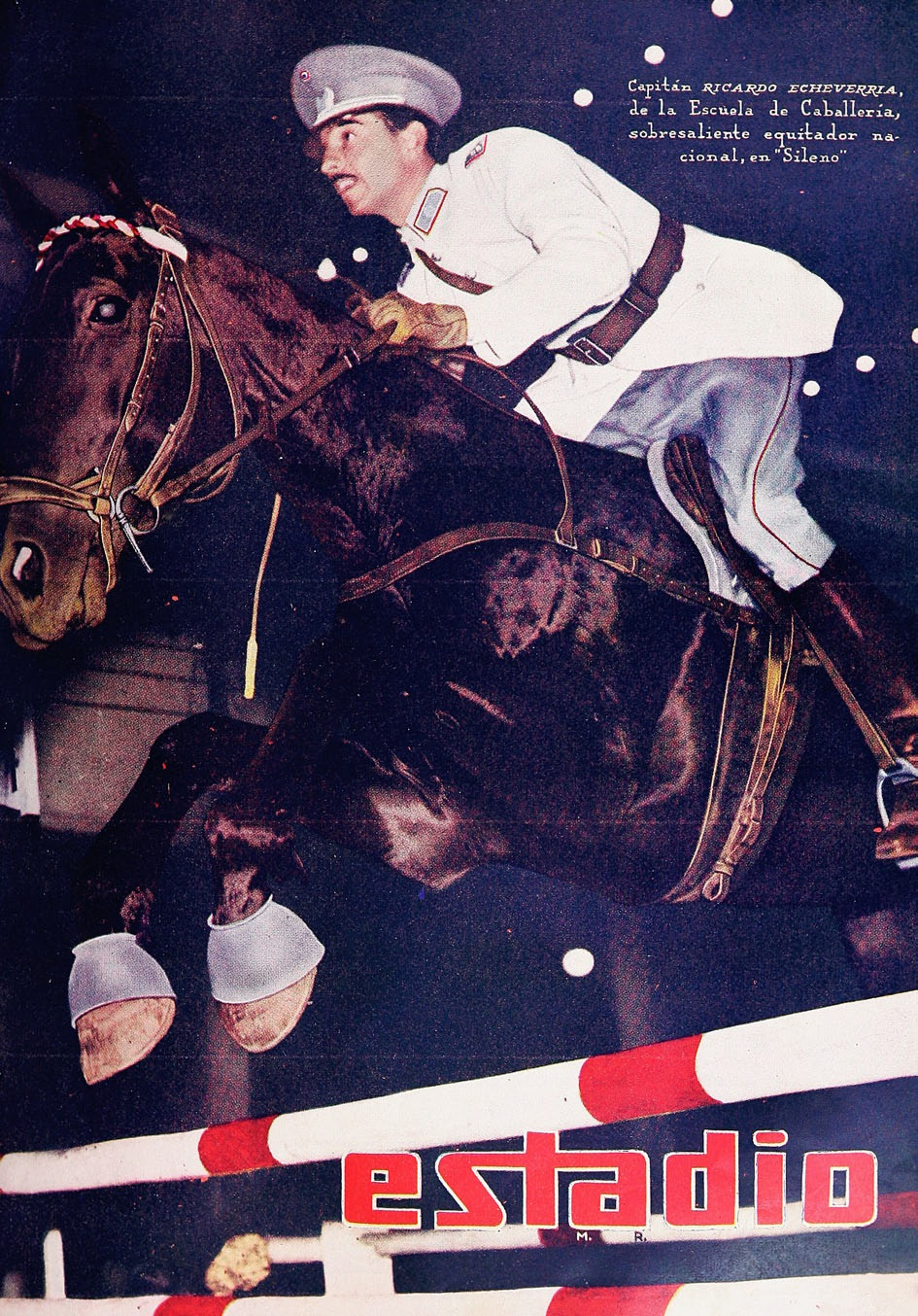

Personal information
- Nationality: Chilean
- Born: 31 May 1918
- Died: 15 August 1970 (aged 52)

Sport
- Sport: Equestrian
Medal record
Equestrian
Representing Chile
Olympic Games
Silver medal – second place	1952 Helsinki	Team jumping
Pan American Games
Gold medal – first place	1951 Buenos Aires	Team jumping
Bronze medal – third place	1951 Buenos Aires	Individual jumping

Ricardo Echeverría (31 May 1918 – 15 August 1970) was a Chilean equestrian and Olympic medalist. He won a silver medal in show jumping competition of the equestrian event at the 1952 Summer Olympics in Helsinki.
