= Víctor Saucedo =

Mexican equestrian

Personal information
- Born: 1919; Toluca, Mexico
- Died: 28 July 2012 (aged 92–93); Mexico City, Mexico

Sport
- Sport: Equestrian

Víctor Saucedo (1919 – 28 July 2012) was a Mexican equestrian. He competed in two events at the 1952 Summer Olympics.
