= Eduardo Assam =

Mexican wrestler (1919–1997)

Personal information
- Full name: Eduardo Assam Rabay
- Born: 19 July 1919 Mexico City, Mexico
- Died: 21 January 1997 (aged 77) Cuauhtémoc, Mexico City, Mexico

Sport
- Sport: Wrestling

Eduardo Assam Rabay (Note: In this Spanish name, the first or paternal surname is Assam and the second or maternal family name is Rabay.) (19 July 1919 – 21 January 1997) was a Mexican wrestler. He competed at the 1948 Summer Olympics and the 1952 Summer Olympics.
