= Wilfred White (equestrian) =

British equestrian (1904–1995)

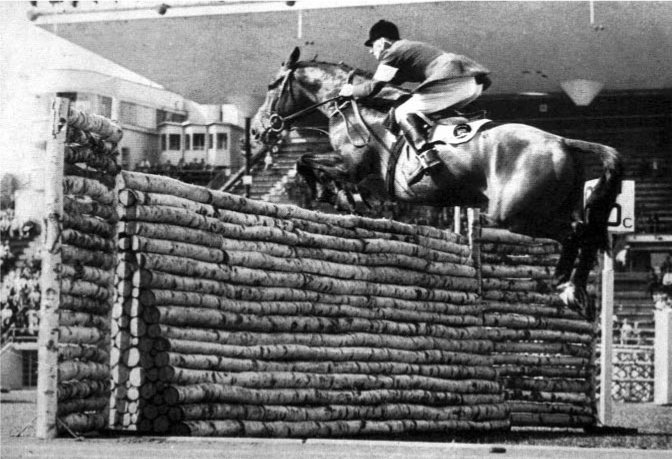
- W. H. White and Nizefella at the 1952 Summer Olympics

Personal information
- Nationality: English
- Born: 30 March 1904 Nantwich
- Died: 21 November 1995 (aged 91)

Sport
- Sport: Equestrian
Medal record
Equestrian
Representing United Kingdom
Olympic Games
Gold medal – first place	1952 Helsinki	Show jumping, Team
Bronze medal – third place	1956 Stockholm	Show jumping, Team

Wilfred White OBE (30 March 1904 – 21 November 1995) was an English equestrian from the United Kingdom and Olympic champion. He won a gold medal in show jumping with the British team at the 1952 Summer Olympics in Helsinki.
