= South Korea at the 1948 Summer Olympics =

- IOC code: KOR
- NOC: Korean Olympic Committee

in London
- Competitors: 50 in 7 sports
- Flag bearer: Sohn Kee-chung
- Officials: 17
- Medals Ranked 32nd: Gold 0 Silver 0 Bronze 2 Total 2

Summer Olympics appearances (overview)
- 1948; 1952; 1956; 1960; 1964; 1968; 1972; 1976; 1980; 1984; 1988; 1992; 1996; 2000; 2004; 2008; 2012; 2016; 2020; 2024

South Korea competed in the 1948 Summer Olympics in London, United Kingdom. It was the first time a Korean state competed as an independent country. The Korean Olympic Committee, established in 1946 and recognized in 1947, represented only Southern Korea although the division of Korea was not fully realized at the time of the 1948 Games.

South Korea won two bronze medals, putting it at the 32nd rank of competing nations.

== Medalists ==
Medal	Name	Sport	Event	Date
Bronze	Kim Sung-Jip	Weightlifting	Men's Middleweight	10 August
Bronze	Han Soo-Ann	Boxing	Men's Flyweight	12 August

== Results and competitors by event ==
=== Athletics ===
==== Men ====
Track & road events

Athletes	Event	Heat		Semifinal		Final	
Athletes	Event	Result	Rank	Result	Rank	Result	Rank
Lee Yun-Seok	800 metres	2:01.4	6 (H1)	Did not advance			
Lee Yun-Seok	1500 metres	-	9 (H4)	Did not advance			
Sim Bok-Seok	5000 metres	-	10 (H2)	Did not advance			
Hong Jong-O	Marathon					2:56:52	25
Suh Yun-Bok	Marathon					2:59:36	27
Choi Yun-Chil	Marathon					DNF	-

==== Field ====
Athletes	Event	Qualification		Final	
Athletes	Event	Result (m)	Rank	Result	Rank
Kim Won-Kwon	Long Jump	6.710	18	Did not advance	
Kim Won-Kwon	Triple Jump	14.600	7T Q	14.250	12
An Yeong-Han	Discus Throw	No mark	-	Did not advance	
Gin Gang-Hwan	Hammer Throw	49.49	7 Q	43.93	13

==== Field ====
Athletes	Event	Qualification		Final	
Athletes	Event	Result (m)	Rank	Result	Rank
Pak Bong-Sik	Discus Throw	33.80	18	Did not advance	

=== Basketball ===
==== Group stage ====
Group B

	Pld	W	L	PF	PA	Pts
South Korea	5	3	2	258	152	8
Chile	5	3	2	269	162	8
Belgium	5	3	2	234	156	8
Philippines	5	3	2	262	200	8
Republic of China	5	3	2	281	202	8
Iraq	5	0	5	113	545	5

- Korea 29-27 Belgium
- Philippines 35-33 Korea
- China 49-48 Korea
- Korea 120-20 Iraq
- Korea 28-21 Chile

==== Quarterfinals ====
- Mexico 43-32 Korea

Classification 7/8

- Czechoslovakia 39-38 Korea

==== Squad ====
An Byeong-Seok, Bang Won-Sun, Chang Ri-Jin, Jo Deuk-Jun, Gang Bong-Hyeon, Kim Jeong-Sin, Lee Jun-Yeong, Lee Sang-Hun, O Su-Cheol

=== Boxing ===
Athlete	Event	Round of 32	Round of 16	Quarterfinals	Semifinals	Final	
Athlete	Event	Opposition Result	Opposition Result	Opposition Result	Opposition Result	Opposition Result	Rank
Han Soo-Ann	Flyweight	Gausterer (AUT); W by points	Cochin (FRA); W by points	Corman (NED); W by KO (R2)	Bandinelli (ITA); L by points	Majdloch (TCH); W by points	Bronze
Seo Byeong-Ran	Featherweight	Hamouda (EGY); W by points	Birks (AUS); W by KO (R2)	Antkiewicz (POL); L by points	Did not advance		5T
Gang In-Seok	Lightweight		Breiby (NOR); L by points	Did not advance			9T

=== Cycling ===
Athlete	Event	Time	Rank
Gwon Ik-hyeon	Individual road race	Did not finish	-
Hwang San-ung	Individual road race	Did not finish	-

=== Football ===
==== First round ====
August 2, 1948
14:00

South Korea	5–3	Mexico
Choi Song-Gon 13'; Bae Jong-Ho 30'; Chung Kook-Chin 63' 66'; Chung Nam-Sik 87'	Report	Cárdenas 23'; Figueroa 85'; Ruiz 89'

Champion Hill, Dulwich
Referee: Leo Lemesic (YUG)

==== Quarterfinal ====
August 5, 1948
13:00

Sweden	12–0	South Korea
Liedholm 11' 62'; G. Nordahl 25' 40' 78' 80'; Gren 27'; Carlsson 61' 64' 82'; Rosen 72' 85'	Report

Selhurst Park, South Norwood
Attendance: 7.110
Referee: Giuseppe Carpani (ITA)

=== Weightlifting ===
Athlete	Event	Press		Snatch		Clean & jerk		Total	Rank
Athlete	Event	Result	Rank	Result	Rank	Result	Rank	Total	Rank
Lee Gyu-Hyeok	Men's Bantamweight (-56 kg)	77.5	14	92.5	2	120	2	290	4
Park Dong-Wook otherwise Park Dong-Uk	Men's Bantamweight (-56 kg)	80	7	85	7	107.5	12	272.5	10
Nam Su-Il	Men's Featherweight (-60 kg)	92.5	6	92.5	8	122.5	2	307.5	4
Choi Hang-Gi	Men's Featherweight (-60 kg)	0	-	85	17	-	-	85	23
Kim Chang-Hui	Men's Lightweight (-67.5 kg)	95	8	100	7	135	5	330	6
Na Si-Yun	Men's Lightweight (-67.5 kg)	90	14	100	8	140	3	330	7
Kim Seong-Jip	Men's Middleweight (-75 kg)	122.5 OR	1	112.5	4	145	3	380	3
Lee Yeong-Hwan	Men's Light-Heavyweight (-82.5 kg)	100	12	105	14	0	-	205	16

=== Wrestling ===
Men's Freestyle

Athlete	Event	Round 1	Round 2	Round 3	Round 4	Quarterfinals	Semifinals	Final	
Athlete	Event	Opposition Result	Opposition Result	Opposition Result	Opposition Result	Opposition Result	Opposition Result	Opposition Result	Rank
Han Sang-Ryong	Bantamweight (−57 kg)		Persson (SWE); L by points	Did not advance					N/A
Kim Kuk-Fan	Featherweight (−62 kg)	López (CUB); L by points	Did not advance						N/A
Kim Seok-Yeong	Lightweight (−67 kg)	Bechara (LIB); W by retired	Ghaffari (IRI); L by fall	Did not advance					9T
Hwang Byeong-gwan	Welterweight (−73 kg)	Culot (BEL); W by points	Moustafa (EGY); L by points	Did not advance					N/A

== Sources ==
- Official Olympic Reports
- International Olympic Committee results database
