= 1948–49 Juventus FC season =

Italian football club season

Juventus Football Club
1948–49 season
- Chairman: Gianni Agnelli
- Manager: Billy Chalmers
- Stadium: Stadio Comunale
- Serie A: 4th
- Top goalscorer: John Hansen (15)
Home colours	Away colours

The 1948–49 Juventus Football Club season was the club's 46th season. In this season, they competed in Serie A.

== Summary ==
The team finished at 4th position after obtaining 44 points in 38 games. John Hansen was top goalscorer for Juventus this season, scoring 15 goals.

== Squad ==
Source: Note: Flags indicate national team as defined under FIFA eligibility rules; some limited exceptions apply. Players may hold more than one non-FIFA nationality.

Pos.	Nation	Player
GK	ITA	Filippo Cavalli
GK	ITA	Lucidio Sentimenti
DF	ITA	Araldo Caprili
DF	ITA	Ugo Locatelli
DF	ITA	Sergio Manente
DF	ITA	Pietro Rava
MF	ITA	Stefano Angeleri
MF	ITA	Teobaldo Depetrini
MF	ITA	Francesco Grosso

Pos.	Nation	Player
MF	ENG	Johnny Jordan
MF	ITA	Carlo Parola
FW	ITA	Giampiero Boniperti
FW	ITA	Emilio Caprile
FW	ITA	Francesco Cergoli
FW	DEN	John Hansen
FW	ITA	Ermes Muccinelli
FW	DEN	Johannes Pløger
FW	ITA	Vittorio Sentimenti

== Competitions ==
=== Serie A ===
==== League table ====
Pos	Team	Pld	W	D	L	GF	GA	GD	Pts
2	Internazionale	38	22	11	5	85	39	+46	55
3	Milan	38	21	8	9	83	52	+31	50
4	Juventus	38	18	8	12	64	47	+17	44
5	Sampdoria	38	16	9	13	74	63	+11	41
5	Bologna	38	11	18	9	53	46	+7	40

Source: Panini

==== Results summary ====
Overall								Home						Away					
Pld	W	D	L	GF	GA	GD	Pts	W	D	L	GF	GA	GD	W	D	L	GF	GA	GD
38	18	8	12	64	47	+17	62	13	3	3	43	20	+23	5	5	9	21	27	−6

Last updated: 12 May 1999.
Source: RSSSF

==== Matches ====
Win Draw Loss

19 September 1948 1	Lazio	0–4	Juventus	Rome
		Report	Sentimenti 6'; Caprile 13'; Boniperti 15', 85'	Stadium: Stadio Torino; Referee: Eriprando Poggipollini

26 September 1948 2	Juventus	3–2	Fiorentina	Turin
	Muccinelli 1'; Jordan 8', 32'	Report	Galassi 30'; Zanolla 89' (pen.)	Stadium: Comunale; Referee: Eliseo Camiolo

3 October 1948 3	Genoa	2–1	Juventus	Genoa
	Verdeal 49'; Dalla Torre 66'	Report	Jordan 3'	Stadium: Stadio Luigi Ferraris; Referee: Luigi Gemini

10 October 1948 4	Juventus	2–0	Triestina	Turin
	Caprile 54'; Boniperti 88'	Report		Stadium: Comunale; Referee: Ferruccio Belle

17 October 1948 5	Atalanta	2–4	Juventus	Bergamo
	Korostelev 6'; Cecconi 14'	Report	Boniperti 16', 21', 85'; Muccinelli 79'	Stadium: Stadio Comunale; Referee: Vittorio Pera

24 October 1948 6	Juventus	1–2	Torino	Turin
	Ballarin 36' (o.g.)	Report	Ossola 25'; Mazzola 77'	Stadium: Comunale; Referee: Generoso Dattilo

31 October 1948 7	Sampdoria	2–0	Juventus	Genoa
	Gei 2'; Baldini 73'	Report		Stadium: Stadio Luigi Ferraris; Referee: Eliseo Camiolo

4 November 1948 8	Juventus	0–1	Inter	Turin
		Report	Amadei 67'	Stadium: Comunale; Referee: Guido Agnolin

7 November 1948 9	Lucchese	2–1	Juventus	Lucca
	Carello 3', 64'	Report	Parola 6'	Stadium: Stadio Porta Elisa; Referee: Giovanni Galeati

14 November 1948 10	Juventus	0–1	Modena	Turin
		Report	Fabbri 35'	Stadium: Comunale; Referee: Mario Codeluppi

21 November 1948 11	Juventus	1–0	Bari	Turin
	Muccinelli 88'	Report		Stadium: Comunale; Referee: Armando Marchetti

28 November 1948 12	Milan	1–1	Juventus	Milan
	Annovazzi 12'	Report	Boniperti 8'	Stadium: Stadio San Siro; Referee: Ferruccio Belle

5 December 1948 13	Juventus	2–2	Livorno	Turin
	Caprile 29'; Cergoli 72'	Report	Cassani 1'; Gimona 33'	Stadium: Comunale; Referee: Giorgio Bernardi

30 December 1948 (Note: The match was scheduled for 8 December 1948. On that day, the match was suspended at 45 minutes due to fog while the score was 1-0. Later the match was shifted to 30 December 1948.) 14	Bologna	3–0	Juventus	Bologna
	Mike 62', 83'; Tacconi 85'	Report		Stadium: Stadio Comunale; Referee: Giuseppe Carpani

12 December 1948 15	Pro Patria	0–1	Juventus	Busto Arsizio
		Report	Hansen 11'	Stadium: Stadio Comunale; Referee: Guido Agnolin

19 December 1948 16	Juventus	3–2	Palermo	Turin
	Hansen 22', 78'; Caprile 80'	Report	Pavesi 42'; Boniforti 71' (pen.)	Stadium: Stadio Comunale; Referee: Mario Cambi

26 December 1948 17	Juventus	0–0	Roma	Turin
		Report		Stadium: Stadio Comunale; Referee: Mario Scotto

3 February 1949 (Note: The match was scheduled for 2 January 1949, but the match was postponed due to impracticability of the field. Later the match was shifted to 3 February 1949.) 18	Novara	0–0	Juventus	Novara
		Report		Stadium: Stadio Comunale; Referee: Vincenzo Orlandini

6 January 1949 19	Juventus	6–1	Padova	Turin
	Caprile 17'; Cergoli 22'; Jordan 25', 39'; Muccinelli 52'; Hansen 58'	Report	Checchetti 66'	Stadium: Stadio Comunale; Referee: Renzo Massai

9 January 1949 20	Juventus	4–1	Lazio	Turin
	Hansen 11', 75'; Caprile 47'; Pløger 75'	Report	Gualtieri 60' (pen.)	Stadium: Stadio Comunale; Referee: Guglielmo Matucci

16 January 1949 21	Fiorentina	0–0	Juventus	Florence
		Report		Stadium: Stadio Comunale; Referee: Giuseppe Carpani

23 January 1949 22	Juventus	2–1	Genoa	Turin
	Hansen 37', 79'	Report	Dalla Torre 43'	Stadium: Stadio Comunale; Referee: Generoso Dattilo

30 January 1949 23	Triestina	1–0	Juventus	Trieste
	Rossetti 58'	Report		Stadium: Stadio Giuseppe Grezar; Referee: Mario Scotto

6 February 1949 24	Juventus	1–0	Atalanta	Turin
	Hansen 2'	Report		Stadium: Stadio Comunale; Referee: Bruno Tassini

13 February 1949 25	Torino	3–1	Juventus	Turin
	Gabetto 17'; Loik 55', 83'	Report	Cergoli 49'	Stadium: Comunale; Referee: Giovanni Galeati

20 February 1949 26	Juventus	5–1	Sampdoria	Turin
	Boniperti 4', 47'; Muccinelli 16', 88'; Caprile 76'	Report	Gei 77'	Stadium: Comunale; Referee: Giorgio Bernardi

6 March 1949 27	Inter	1–1	Juventus	Milan
	Amadei 10'	Report	Muccinelli 76'	Stadium: Arena Civica; Referee: Giovanni Galeati

13 March 1949 28	Juventus	2–1	Lucchese	Turin
	Muccinelli 3'; Hansen 37'	Report	Peruzzo 62'	Stadium: Comunale; Referee: Giuseppe Boffardi

20 March 1949 29	Modena	2–2	Juventus	Modena
	Cavazzuti 20', 57'	Report	Hansen 10'; Boniperti 41'	Stadium: Stadio Comunale; Referee: Vincenzo Orlandini

3 April 1949 30	Bari	2–1	Juventus	Bari
	Isetto 31'; Voros 66'	Report	Hansen 59'	Stadium: Stadio della Vittoria; Referee: Giuseppe Carpani

10 April 1949 31	Juventus	1–1	Milan	Turin
	Muccinelli 77'	Report	Nordahl 57'	Stadium: Comunale; Referee: Generoso Dattilo

18 April 1949 32	Livorno	1–3	Juventus	Tuscany
	Stradella 67'	Report	Caprile 8'; Boniperti 52', 75'	Stadium: Stadio Comunale; Referee: Giorgio Bernardi

24 April 1949 33	Juventus	2–0 (Note: The match was suspended in the 66th minute due to abandonment of the field by Bologna in protest against the referees' decisions on the score of 1-2; For this, Juventus was awarded 2-0 victory.)	Bologna	Turin
	Boniperti 40'	Report	Mike 10', 63'	Stadium: Comunale; Referee: Giuseppe Carpani

30 April 1949 34	Juventus	4–3	Pro Patria	Turin
	Caprile 12'; Boniperti 30'; Hansen 65'; Manente 78'	Report	Turconi 7'; Martini 23'; Toros 73'	Stadium: Comunale; Referee: Bruno Tassini

8 May 1949 35	Palermo	2–0	Juventus	Palermo
	De Santis 34'; Boniforti 81' (pen.)	Report		Stadium: Stadio Comunale; Referee: Vincenzo Orlandini

15 May 1949 36	Roma	0–1	Juventus	Rome
		Report	Boniperti 61'	Stadium: Stadio Torino; Referee: Gino Cicardi

29 May 1949 37	Juventus	4–1	Novara	Turin
	Boniperti 25', 60'; Hansen 51', 54'	Report	Pombia 44'	Stadium: Comunale; Referee: Antonio Picasso

5 June 1949 38	Padova	3–0	Juventus	Padua
	Beraldo 3'; Checchetti 12'; Arrighini 79' (pen.)	Report		Stadium: Stadio Silvio Appiani; Referee: Luigi Valsecchi
