= Football at the 1948 Summer Olympics =

Coordinates: 51.5556°N 0.2797°W

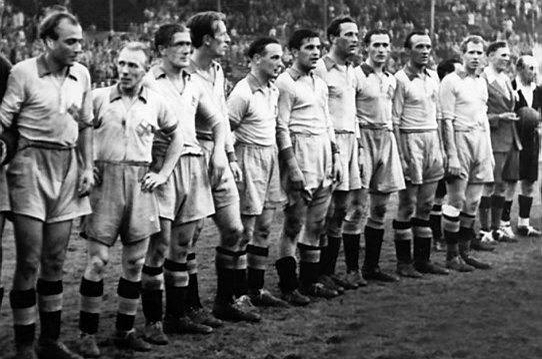
- Sweden, gold medal winners

Tournament details
- Host country: Great Britain
- Dates: 26 July – 13 August 1948
- Teams: 18 (from 5 confederations)
- Venues: 13 (in 3 host cities)

Final positions
- Champions: Sweden (1st title)
- Runners-up: Yugoslavia
- Third place: Denmark
- Fourth place: Great Britain

Tournament statistics
- Matches played: 18
- Goals scored: 102 (5.67 per match)
- Top scorer(s): (Sweden) Gunnar Nordahl (Denmark) John Hansen (7 goals)

The football tournament of the 1948 Summer Olympics was won by Sweden. This remains Sweden's only international title at a senior male football level and was the first international appearance of the trio that would later be known as Gre-No-Li dominating the Italian league at A.C. Milan in the 1950s.

It was the first international football tournament ever to be broadcast on television, with the semi-finals, bronze medal play-off and final all being broadcast live in full on the BBC Television Service.

== Venues ==
Wembley	Highbury	Dulwich	Fulham
Empire Stadium	Arsenal Stadium	Champion Hill	Craven Cottage
Walthamstow	London South coast (→)		Tottenham
Green Pond Road	London South coast (→)		White Hart Lane
Brentford	London South coast (→)		
Griffin Park	London South coast (→)		
Ilford	London South coast (→)		Brighton
Lynn Road	London South coast (→)		Goldstone Ground
South Norwood	London South coast (→)		Portsmouth
Selhurst Park	London South coast (→)		Fratton Park

== Participating nations ==
- Afghanistan (16)
- Austria (21)
- Republic of China (18)
- Denmark (22)
- Egypt (22)
- France (21)
- Great Britain (22)
- India (18)
- Ireland (18)
- Italy (18)
- South Korea (16)
- Luxembourg (22)
- Mexico (17)
- Netherlands (19)
- Sweden (18)
- Turkey (21)
- United States (15)
- Yugoslavia (22)

== Final tournament ==
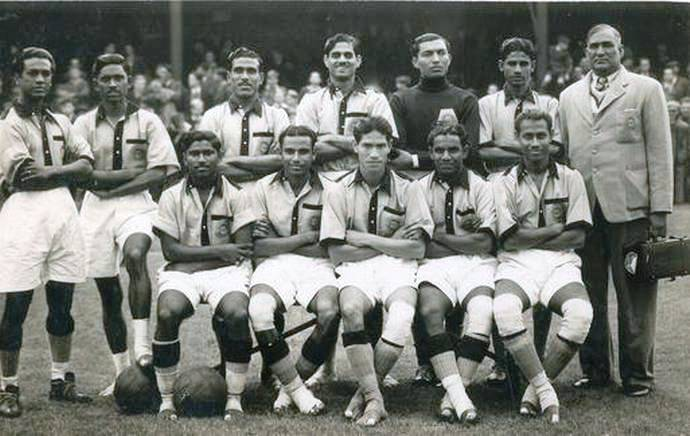
The Indian team at 1948 Olympics, captain Talimeren Ao at the centre of first row, goal scorer Sarangapani Raman next to Ao and coach Balaidas Chatterjee to the furthest right.

The tournament began on 26 July 1948 with a preliminary round of two matches: Luxembourg defeating Afghanistan 6–0 and the Netherlands beating Ireland 3–1, with Faas Wilkes scoring two goals for the Dutch. In the first round, which began five days later, the Netherlands played Great Britain at Highbury, Britain prevailing 4–3 after extra time. In goal for Britain was Ronnie Simpson, who would go on to become the oldest Scottish international debutant in history and one of the Lisbon Lions. Yugoslavia (victors over Luxembourg) and Sweden (3–0 winners against Austria) also went through. France eliminated India.

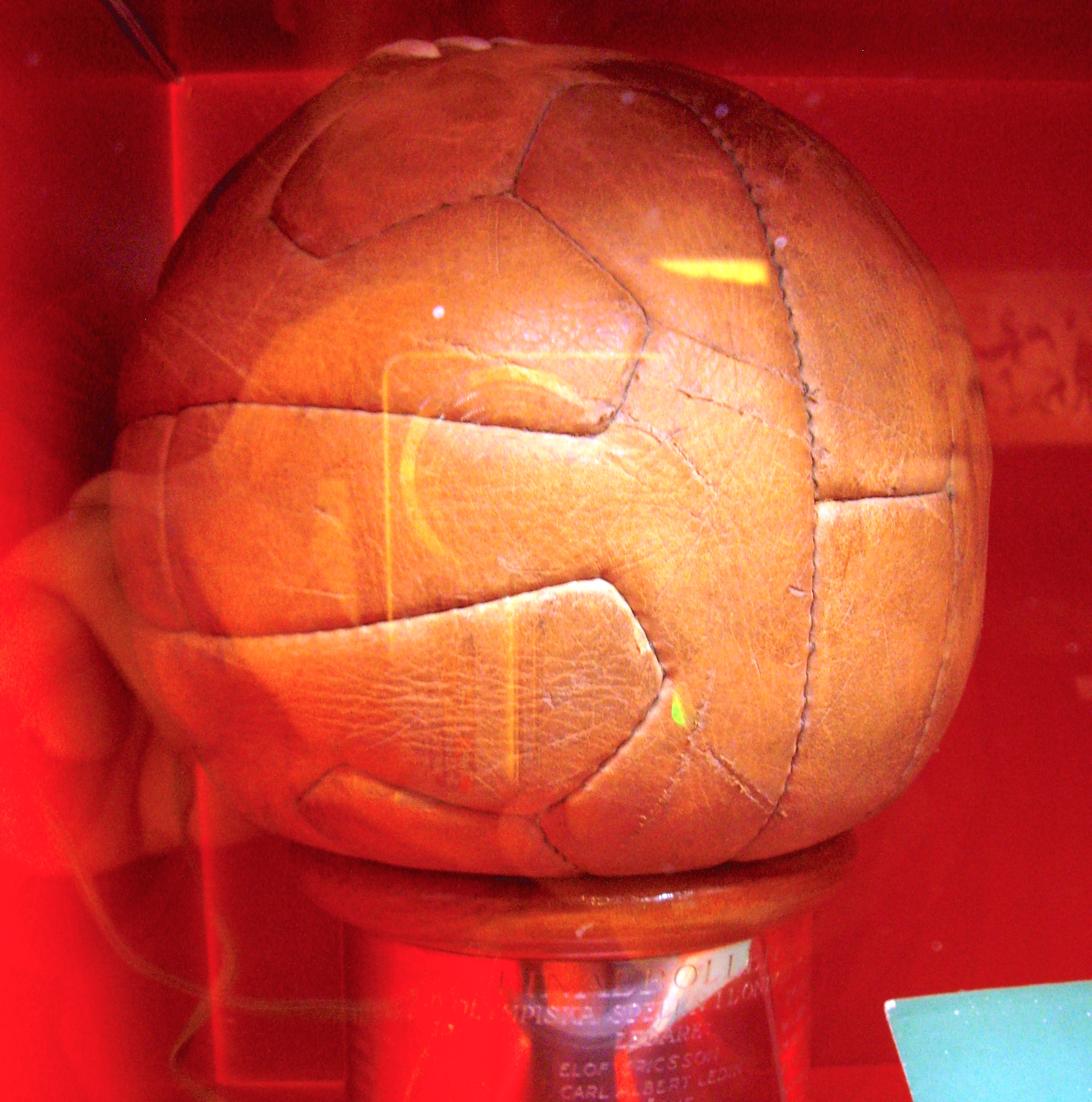
The final match ball.

Sweden's style of play at White Hart Lane attracted much attention. Their forward line contained three exceptional players; one of them Gunnar Gren scored a brace in an easy win. There were two goals, as well, for future FIFA World Cup star Željko Čajkovski in Yugoslavia's 6–1 rout of Luxembourg, although they were behind at half-time. South Korea beat Mexico 5–3. Walter Bahr, Ed Souza, Charlie Colombo and John Souza were part of the United States team that lost 9–0 to Italy, conceding five goals at the end of the match when they were down to nine men. They would later participate in the 1950 FIFA World Cup and beat the favourites England in one of the greatest upsets in football history.

In the quarter-finals, Sweden defeated the South Koreans and in the semi-finals Sweden defeated the Danes. In the second semi-final, Great Britain played Yugoslavia at Wembley Stadium, going out by three goals to one. 3–1 was also the score in the final in favour of Sweden over Yugoslavia.

=== Preliminary round ===
26 July 1948
18:00

Luxembourg	6–0	Afghanistan
Gales 6', 79'; Kettel 40'; Schammel 41'; Paulus 62', 80'	Report

Goldstone Ground, Brighton
Attendance: 5,000
Referee: A.C. Williams (Great Britain)

26 July 1948
18:00

Netherlands	3–1	(Republic of Ireland) Ireland
Wilkes 1', 74'; Roosenburg 11'	Report	Smith 52'

Fratton Park, Portsmouth
Attendance: 8,000
Referee: George Reader (Great Britain)

=== First round ===
31 July 1948
18:30

Yugoslavia	6–1	Luxembourg
Stanković 57'; Mihajlović 61'; Že. Čajkovski 65', 70'; Mitić 74'; Bobek 87'	Report	Schammel 10'

Craven Cottage, Fulham
Attendance: 7,000
Referee: Karel van der Meer (Netherlands)

31 July 1948
18:30

Denmark	3–1 (a.e.t.)	Egypt
K. Hansen 82', 95'; Pløger 119' (pen.)	Report	El Guindy 83'

Selhurst Park, South Norwood
Attendance: 12,000
Referee: Stanley Boardman (Great Britain)

31 July 1948
18:30

Great Britain	4–3 (a.e.t.)	Netherlands
McBain 22'; Hardisty 58'; Kelleher 77'; McIlvenny 111'	Report	Appel 20', 63'; Wilkes 81'

Arsenal Stadium, Highbury
Attendance: 21,000
Referee: Vald Laursen (Denmark)

31 July 1948
18:30

France	2–1	India
Courbin 30'; Persillon 89'	Report	Raman 70'

Lynn Road, Ilford
Attendance: 17,000
Referee: Gunnar Dahlner (Sweden)

2 August 1948
18:30

Turkey	4–0	Republic of China
Kılıç 18', 61'; Saygun 72'; Lefter 87'	Report

Green Pond Road, Walthamstow
Attendance: 3,000
Referee: Johann Beck (Austria)

2 August 1948
18:30

Sweden	3–0	Austria
G. Nordahl 2', 10'; Rosén 71'	Report

White Hart Lane, Tottenham
Attendance: 9,514
Referee: William Ling (Great Britain)

2 August 1948
18:30

South Korea	5–3	Mexico
Choi Seong-gon 13'; Bae Jeong-ho 30'; Chung Kook-chin 63', 66'; Chung Nam-sik 87'	Report	Cárdenas 23'; Figueroa 85'; Ruiz 89'

Champion Hill, Dulwich
Attendance: 6,500
Referee: Leo Lemešić (Yugoslavia)

2 August 1948
18:30

Italy	9–0	United States
Pernigo 2', 57', 88', 90'; Stellin 25' (pen.); Turconi 46'; Cavigioli 72', 87'; Caprile 90'	Report

Griffin Park, Brentford
Attendance: 20,000
Referee: Charles de la Salle (France)

=== Quarter-finals ===
5 August 1948
18:30

Yugoslavia	3–1	Turkey
Že. Čajkovski 21'; Bobek 60'; Wölfl 80'	Report	Gülesin 33'

Lynn Road, Ilford
Attendance: 8,000
Referee: Victor Sdez (France)

5 August 1948
18:30

Sweden	12–0	South Korea
Liedholm 11', 62'; G. Nordahl 25', 40', 78', 80'; Gren 27'; Carlsson 61', 64', 82'; Rosén 72', 85'	Report

Selhurst Park, South Norwood
Attendance: 7,110
Referee: Giuseppe Carpani (Italy)

5 August 1948
18:30

Great Britain	1–0	France
Hardisty 29'	Report

Craven Cottage, Fulham
Attendance: 25,000
Referee: Karel van der Meer (Netherlands)

5 August 1948
18:30

Denmark	5–3	Italy
John Hansen 30', 53', 74', 82'; Pløger 84'	Report	Cavigioli 49'; Caprile 67'; Pernigo 81'

Arsenal Stadium, Highbury
Attendance: 25,000
Referee: William Ling (Great Britain)

=== Semi-finals ===
10 August 1948
18:30

Sweden	4–2	Denmark
Carlsson 18', 42'; Rosén 31', 37'	Report	Seebach 3'; John Hansen 77'

Empire Stadium, Wembley
Attendance: 20,000
Referee: Stanley Boardman (Great Britain)

11 August 1948
18:30

Great Britain	1–3	Yugoslavia
Donovan 20'	Report	Bobek 19'; Wölfl 24'; Mitić 48'

Empire Stadium, Wembley
Attendance: 40,000
Referee: Karel van der Meer (Netherlands)

=== Bronze medal match ===
13 August 1948
14:00

Great Britain	3–5	Denmark
Aitken 5'; Hardisty 33'; Amor 63' (pen.)	Report	Præst 12', 49'; John Hansen 16', 77'; J. Sørensen 41'

Empire Stadium, Wembley
Attendance: 50,000
Referee: Karel van der Meer (Netherlands)

=== Gold medal match ===
13 August 1948
18:30

Sweden	3–1	Yugoslavia
Gren 24', 67' (pen.); G. Nordahl 48'	Report	Bobek 42'

Empire Stadium, Wembley
Attendance: 60,000
Referee: William Ling (England)

Team details

Sweden	Yugoslavia

GK	Torsten Lindberg
RB	Knut Nordahl
LB	Erik Nilsson
RH	Birger Rosengren
CH	Bertil Nordahl
LH	Sune Andersson
OR	Kjell Rosén
IR	Gunnar Gren
CF	Gunnar Nordahl
IL	Henry Carlsson
OL	Nils Liedholm
Manager:
(United Kingdom) George Raynor

GK	Ljubomir Lovrić
RB	Miroslav Brozović
LB	Branko Stanković
RH	Zlatko Čajkovski
CH	Miodrag Jovanović
LH	Aleksandar Atanacković
OR	Zvonimir Cimermančić
IR	Rajko Mitić
CF	Stjepan Bobek
IL	Željko Čajkovski
OL	Bernard Vukas
Manager:
(Socialist Federal Republic of Yugoslavia) Milorad Arsenijević

== Bracket ==
Preliminary round
Afghanistan	0
Luxembourg	6
Yugoslavia
bye
Turkey
bye
Republic of China
bye
Netherlands	3
Republic of Ireland	1
Great Britain
bye
France
bye
India
bye
Sweden
bye
Austria
bye
South Korea
bye
Mexico
bye
Denmark
bye
Egypt
bye
Italy
bye
United States
bye

First round
Yugoslavia	6
Luxembourg	1
Turkey	4
Republic of China	0
Great Britain (a.e.t.)	4
Netherlands	3
France	2
India	1
Sweden	3
Austria	0
South Korea	5
Mexico	3
Denmark (a.e.t.)	3
Egypt	1
Italy	9
United States	0

Quarter-finals
Yugoslavia	3
Turkey	1
Great Britain	1
France	0
Sweden	12
South Korea	0
Denmark	5
Italy	3

Semi-finals
Yugoslavia	3
Great Britain	1
Sweden	4
Denmark	2

Finals
Yugoslavia	1
Sweden	3
Bronze Medal match
Great Britain	3
Denmark	5

== Medalists ==
Gold	Silver	Bronze
Sweden	Yugoslavia	Denmark
Torsten Lindberg; Karl Svensson; Knut Nordahl; Erik Nilsson; Birger Rosengren; Bertil Nordahl; Sune Andersson; Gunnar Gren; Gunnar Nordahl; Henry Carlsson; Nils Liedholm; Börje Leander	Franjo Šoštarić; Miroslav Brozović; Branko Stanković; Zlatko Čajkovski; Miodrag Jovanović; Aleksandar Atanacković; Prvoslav Mihajlović; Rajko Mitić; Franjo Wölfl; Stjepan Bobek; Željko Čajkovski; Kosta Tomašević; Ljubomir Lovrić; Zvonimir Cimermančić; Bernard Vukas	Knud Bastrup-Birk; Hans Colberg; Edvin Hansen; John Hansen; Jørgen W. Hansen; Karl Aage Hansen; Erik Kuld Jensen; Ivan Jensen; Ove Jensen; Hans Viggo Jensen; Per Knudsen; Knud Lundberg; Eigil Nielsen; Knud Børge Overgaard; Poul Petersen; Axel Pilmark; Johannes Pløger; Carl Aage Præst; Holger Seebach; Erling Sørensen; Jørgen Leschly Sørensen; Dion Ørnvold

== Statistics ==
=== Goalscorers ===
7 goals

- John Hansen (Denmark)
- Gunnar Nordahl (Sweden)

5 goals

- Francesco Pernigo (Italy)
- Henry Carlsson (Sweden)
- Kjell Rosén (Sweden)

4 goals

- (Socialist Federal Republic of Yugoslavia) Stjepan Bobek (Yugoslavia)

3 goals

- (United Kingdom) Bob Hardisty (Great Britain)
- Emidio Cavigioli (Italy)
- Servaas Wilkes (Netherlands)
- Gunnar Gren (Sweden)
- (Socialist Federal Republic of Yugoslavia) Željko Čajkovski (Yugoslavia)

2 goals

- Karl Aage Hansen (Denmark)
- Johannes Pløger (Denmark)
- Emilio Caprile (Italy)
- Julien Gales (Luxembourg)
- Marcel Paulus (Luxembourg)
- Fernand Schammel (Luxembourg)
- Bram Appel (Netherlands)
- Chung Kook-chin (South Korea)
- Nils Liedholm (Sweden)
- Gündüz Kılıç (Turkey)
- (Socialist Federal Republic of Yugoslavia) Rajko Mitić (Yugoslavia)
- (Socialist Federal Republic of Yugoslavia) Franjo Wölfl (Yugoslavia)

1 goal

- Karl Aage Præst (Denmark)
- Holger Seebach (Denmark)
- Jørgen Leschly Sørensen (Denmark)
- El Din El Guindy (Egypt)
- René Courbin (France)
- René Persillon (France)
- (United Kingdom) Andy Aitken (Great Britain)
- (United Kingdom) Bill Amor (Great Britain)
- (United Kingdom) Frank Donovan (Great Britain)
- (United Kingdom) Dennis Kelleher (Great Britain)
- (United Kingdom) Douglas McBain (Great Britain)
- (United Kingdom) Harry McIlvenny (Great Britain)
- Sarangapani Raman (India)
- (Republic of Ireland) Bobby Smith (Ireland)
- Adone Stellin (Italy)
- Angelo Turconi (Italy)
- Nicolas Kettel (Luxembourg)
- Raúl Cárdenas (Mexico)
- Antonio Figueroa (Mexico)
- José Ruiz (Mexico)
- Andre Roosenburg (Netherlands)
- Bai Chon-go (South Korea)
- Chung Nam-sik (South Korea)
- Choi Song-gon (South Korea)
- Şükrü Gülesin (Turkey)
- Lefter Küçükandonyadis (Turkey)
- Huseyin Saygun (Turkey)
- (Socialist Federal Republic of Yugoslavia) Prvoslav Mihajlović (Yugoslavia)
- (Socialist Federal Republic of Yugoslavia) Branko Stanković (Yugoslavia)

== Sources ==
- 1948 Olympic Organising Committee (1951). Official Report (PDF). London. pp. 14, 18, 39, 45–46, 54, 57, 62, 64, 65, 78, 85, 109, 116, 121, 129, 131, 184, 187, 382–388, 534, 541, 544–6. Archived from the original (PDF) on 27 September 2013.
- "Games of the XIV. Olympiad; Football Tournament". RSSSF.
