= Boxing at the 1948 Summer Olympics – Flyweight =

Boxing competitions

Men's Flyweight at the Games of the XIV Olympiad
- Dates: August 7–12, 1948
- Competitors: 26 from 26 nations

Medalists
1st place, gold medalist(s)		Pascual Pérez	Argentina
2nd place, silver medalist(s)		Spartaco Bandinelli	Italy
3rd place, bronze medalist(s)		Han Soo-ann	South Korea

The men's flyweight event was part of the boxing programme at the 1948 Summer Olympics. The weight class was the lightest contested, and allowed boxers of up to 51 kilograms. The competition was held from Saturday, 7 August 1948 to Friday, 13 August 1948. Twenty-six boxers from 26 nations competed.

Prior to the competition beginning, eventual gold medallist Pascual Perez was disqualified for being overweight. It was quickly discovered that officials had confused Perez with his bantamweight teammate Arnoldo Pares, and he was reinstated back into the competition.

== Medalists ==
Gold	Silver	Bronze
Pascual Pérez; Argentina	Spartaco Bandinelli; Italy	Han Soo-ann; South Korea

== Results ==
Round of 32; 7 August
Pascual Pérez (ARG)	W
Ricardo Adolfo (PHI)	RSC2
Des Williams (RSA)	PTS
Ingemar Burgström (SWE)	L
Han Soo-ann (KOR)	PTS
Robert Gausterer (AUT)	L
Maxim Cochin (FRA)	PTS
Carlomagno Meneses (PER)	L
Appie Corman (NED)	PTS
Ghasem Rassaeli (IRI)	L
Maung Myo Thant (BIR)	PTS
Joey Sandulo (CAN)	L
Luis Martínez (ESP)	PTS
Miksa Bondi (HUN)	L
Ron Gower (AUS)	PTS
Janusz Kasperczak (POL)	L
Spartaco Bandinelli (ITA)	PTS
Olli Lehtinen (FIN)	L
Leslie Handunge (CEY)	PTS
Guillermo Porteiro (URU)	L

Round of 16; 10 August
Rabin Bhatta (IND)	KO1
Frankie Sodano (USA)	W
William Barnes (IRL)	L
František Majdloch (TCH)	PTS
Alex Bollaert (BEL)	PTS
Henry Carpenter (GBR)	L
Pascual Pérez (ARG)	W
Des Williams (RSA)	RSC3
Han Soo-An (KOR)	PTS
Maxim Cochin (FRA)	L
Appie Corman (NED)	W
Maung Myo Thant (BIR)	RSC3
Luis Martínez (ESP)	PTS
Ronald Gower (AUS)	L
Spartaco Bandinelli (ITA)	PTS
Leslie Handunge (CEY)	L

Quarterfinals; 11 August
Frankie Sodano (USA)	L
František Majdloch (TCH)	PTS
Alex Bollaert (BEL)	L
Pascual Pérez (ARG)	PTS
Han Soo-ann (KOR)	W
Appie Corman (NED)	KO2
Luis Martínez (ESP)	L
Spartaco Bandinelli (ITA)	PTS

Semifinals; 12 August
František Majdloch (TCH)	L
Pascual Pérez (ARG)	PTS
Han Soo-ann (KOR)	L
Spartaco Bandinelli (ITA)	PTS

Final; 13 August
Pascual Pérez (ARG)	PTS
Spartaco Bandinelli (ITA)	L
Bronze medal bout
Han Soo-ann (KOR)	PTS
František Majdloch (TCH)	L
