= Maung Myo Thant =

Burmese boxer (born 1922)

Personal information
- Nationality: Burmese
- Born: 1922 Burma, British India

Sport
- Sport: Boxing
- Club: Mandalay BC, Yangon

Myo Thant (born 1922), also known under the name Maung Myo Thant, is a Burmese boxer. Domestically, he would represent the sports club Mandalay BC based in Yangon.

Myo would compete at the 1948 Summer Olympics, representing Burma in men's boxing. He would be one of the first athletes to represent the nation at an Olympic Games as they would make their debut at this edition. There, he competed in the men's flyweight event, winning his first round. He would then advance to the second round and was then defeated. Overall, he would place equal ninth in the event.

== Biography ==
Myo Thant was born in 1922 in British Burma (now Myanmar), British India. Domestically, he would represent the sports club Mandalay BC based in Yangon.

He would compete at the 1948 Summer Olympics in London, Great Britain, representing Burma in men's boxing. He would be one of the first Burmese boxers and one of the first Burmese sportspeople overall to compete at an Olympic Games, as the nation would make its official debut at the Olympic Games at this edition of the competition.

There, he would compete in the men's flyweight event against 25 other competitors. The first round of the event would be held on 7 August 1948, he would compete against Joey Sandulo of Canada. There, Myo would defeat Sandulo per a decision made by a referee, advancing further to the second round held three days later. Myo then competed against Appie Corman of the Netherlands on 10 August 1948. Myo would be defeated by Corman after the referee stopped the contest as it was determined by the referee that Myo could not continue the fight. He would place equal ninth overall alongside seven other competitors that competed in the event.
