= McIlvenny =

McIlvenny is a surname. Notable people with the surname include:

- Bobby McIlvenny (born 1926), Northern Irish footballer
- Charles McIlvenny (born 1897), English/South African golfer
- Ed McIlvenny (1924–1989), Scottish-American footballer
- Harry McIlvenny (born 1922), English footballer
- Jimmy McIlvenny (1892–?), English footballer
- Frank McIlvenny (1963–?), Human Rights Activist
