= Frankie Sodano =

American boxer (1931–2015)

Personal information
- Full name: Francis Joseph Sodano
- Born: March 10, 1931 Philadelphia, Pennsylvania, U.S.
- Died: May 11, 2015 (aged 84) Philadelphia, Pennsylvania, U.S.

Sport
- Sport: Boxing

Francis Joseph Sodano (March 10, 1931 – May 11, 2015) was an American boxer. He competed in the men's flyweight event at the 1948 Summer Olympics. At the 1948 Summer Olympics, he defeated Rabin Bhatta of India, before losing to František Majdloch of Czechoslovakia.
