= Frank Donovan =

Frank Donovan may refer to:

- Frank Donovan (footballer) (1919–2003), Welsh Olympic footballer
- Frank Donovan (politician) (born 1947), Australian politician

== See also ==
- Francis Donovan (disambiguation)
- Frank O'Donovan, Irish actor and singer
