= Bendinelli =

Bendinelli is an Italian surname. Notable people with the surname include:

- Angelo Bendinelli (1876–1942), Italian tenor
- Cesare Bendinelli (c. 1542–1617), Italian trumpeter
- Davide Bendinelli (born 1974), Italian politician

== See also ==
- Bandinelli (surname)
