= Francis Donovan =

Francis Donovan may refer to:

- Francis Patrick Donovan (1922–2012), Australian ambassador
- Francis L. Donovan, United States Marine Corps general
- Frank Donovan (footballer) (Francis James Donovan, 1919–2003), Welsh Olympic footballer
- Frank Donovan (politician) (Francis Anthony Donovan, born 1947), Australian politician

== See also ==
- Frank Donovan (disambiguation)
- Frances Donovan, journalist and presenter
