= Miksa Bondi =

Hungarian boxer (1918–1997)

Personal information
- Nationality: Hungarian
- Born: 8 May 1918 Budapest, Austria-Hungary
- Died: 11 August 1997 (aged 79) Budapest, Hungary

Sport
- Sport: Boxing

Miksa Bondi (8 May 1918 – 11 August 1997) was a Hungarian boxer who competed in the men's flyweight event at the 1948 Summer Olympics. At the 1948 Summer Olympics, he lost to Ron Gower of Australia.
