= Araldo =

Araldo may refer to:

== Given name ==
- Araldo Caprili (1920–1982), Italian footballer
- Araldo Cossutta (1925–2017), Croatian-born American architect
- Araldo di Crollalanza (1892–1986), Italian journalist and politician

== Other uses ==
- Araldo (horse) (2008–2014), British thoroughbred racehorse
- Araldo Telefonico
