= Mohammed Habib (disambiguation) =

Mohammed Habib may refer to:

- Mohammed Habib, Egyptian politician
- Mohammed Habib (footballer), Egyptian footballer
- Mohammad Habib, Indian historian
- Mohamed Habib, Bahraini handball player
- Mohamed Habib Naser, Bahraini handball player
- Mohamed Mohamed Habib, Egyptian basketball player
