= Raoul Courbin =

French footballer (1926–1954)

Personal information
- Date of birth: 18 August 1926
- Place of birth: Saint-Symphorien, France
- Date of death: 7 July 1954 (aged 27)
- Place of death: Île-d'Aix, France

Senior career*
Years	Team	Apps	(Gls)
- Chamois Niortais

International career
1948	France Olympic football team	2	(1)
- * Club domestic league appearances and goals

Raoul Courbin (18 August 1926 – 7 July 1954) was a French footballer. He competed in the men's tournament at the 1948 Summer Olympics. Courbin died between 1952 and 1959.

== International career ==
Courbin was selected in France Football squad for the 1948 Summer Olympics, and played France two Games against India and Great Britain, as France were eliminated in the Quarterfinals. Courbin scored a goal against India at the 1948 Olympics, in France 2–1 win, which was independent India's first official match.
