= Bandinelli (surname) =

Bandinelli is an Italian surname. Notable people with the surname include:

- Angelo Maria Bandinelli, 17th-century postmaster general of the Polish–Lithuanian Commonwealth
- Bartolommeo Bandinelli (1493–1560), Italian Renaissance sculptor, draughtsman and painter
- Filippo Bandinelli (born 1995), Italian footballer
- Marco Bandinelli, Italian Baroque painter
- Ranuccio Bianchi Bandinelli (1900–1975), Italian archaeologist and art historian
- Roberto Bandinelli (died 1650), Florentine merchant and postmaster of the Polish–Lithuanian Commonwealth
- Spartaco Bandinelli (1921–1997), Italian boxer
