= List of Empoli FC seasons =

Empoli FC is an Italian professional football club based in Empoli, Florence, who play their matches in Stadio Carlo Castellani. The club was formed in 1920, and the club's formal debut in an official league was in 1921. Before that time they played several amateur tournaments.

The club has won the Serie B three times.

Empoli has played the Serie A 16 seasons, Serie B 22 seasons, Serie C (or equivalent) 48 seasons, Serie D (or equivalent) 7 seasons and 8 seasons in lower competitions.

This list details the club's achievements in major competitions, and the top scorers for each season. Records of local or regional competitions are not included due to them being considered of less importance.

== Key ==
- Pld = Games played
- W = Games won
- D = Games drawn
- L = Games lost
- GF = Goals for
- GA = Goals against
- Pts = Points
- Pos = Final position
- Serie A = 1st Tier in Italian League
- Serie B = 2nd Tier in Italian League
- Serie C = 3rd Tier in Italian League
- Prima Categoria = 1st Tier until 1922
- Promozione = 2nd Tier until 1922
- Prima Divisione = 1st Tier until 1926
- Prima Divisione = 2nd Tier (1926–1929)
- Seconda Divisione = 2nd Tier until 1926
- Seconda Divisione = 3rd Tier (1926–1929)
- Divisione Nazionale = 1st Tier (1926–1929)
- F = Final
- SF = Semi-finals
- QF = Quarter-finals
- R16 = Last 16
- R32 = Last 32
- R64 = Last 64
- QR1 = First Qualifying Round
- QR2 = Second Qualifying Round
- QR3 = Third Qualifying Round
- PO = Play-Offs
- 1R = Round 1
- 2R = Round 2
- 3R = Round 3
- GS = Group Stage
- 2GS = Second Group Stage
- EC = European Cup (1955–1992)
- UCL = UEFA Champions League (1993–present)
- CWC = UEFA Cup Winners' Cup (1960–1999)
- UC = UEFA Cup (1971–2008)
- UEL = UEFA Europa League (2009–present)
- USC = UEFA Super Cup
- INT = Intercontinental Cup (1960–2004)
- WC = FIFA Club World Cup (2005–present)

Champions	Runners-up	Promoted	Relegated	1st Tier	2nd Tier	3rd Tier	4th Tier	5th Tier	6th Tier	7th Tier	8th Tier

== Seasons ==
Results of league and cup competitions by season
Season	Division	Pld	W	D	L	GF	GA	Pts	Pos	Cup	Supercoppa Italiana	Cup	Result	Player(s)	Goals
Season	League									Cup	Supercoppa Italiana	UEFA – FIFA		Top goalscorer(s)	
1921–22	Terza Divisione Toscana Girone A (5)								2nd					n/a	
1922–23	Terza Divisione Toscana Girone A (5)	8	4	1	3	12	22	9	2nd					n/a	
1923–24	Terza Divisione Toscana Girone A (5)	6	1	3	2	11	10	5	3rd					n/a	
1924–25	Terza Divisione Toscana Girone A (5)	16	6	3	7	27	31	15	5th					n/a	
1925–26	Terza Divisione Toscana Girone B (5)	10						16	2nd					n/a	
1926–27	Terza Divisione Toscana Girone A (5)	12	11	0	1	52	12	22	1st					n/a	
1927–28	Seconda Divisione Nord Girone C (4)	18	6	6	6	29	34	18	4th					n/a	
1928–29	Seconda Divisione Nord Girone G (4)	22	15	1	6	53	32	31	1st					n/a	
1929–30	Prima Divisione Nord Girone A (3)	24	9	4	11	30	43	22	10th					n/a	
1930–31	Prima Divisione Nord Girone B (3)	26	6	6	14	26	41	18	12th					n/a	
1931–32	Prima Divisione Girone D (3)	30	13	7	10	52	33	33	4th					n/a	
1932–33	Prima Divisione Girone F (3)	26	9	4	13	31	44	22	9th					n/a	
1933–34	Prima Divisione Girone F (3)	28	7	6	15	28	53	20	12th					n/a	
1934–35	Prima Divisione Girone F (3)	22	11	3	8	33	31	25	4th					n/a	
1935–36	Serie C Girone C (3)								-					n/a	
1936–37	Prima Divisione Toscana Girone A (4)	12	8	2	2	27	11	18	1st					n/a	
1937–38	Serie C Girone D (3)	30	13	5	12	39	38	31	9th					n/a	
1938–39	Serie C Girone E (3)	24	11	3	10	35	32	25	6th					n/a	
1939–40	Serie C Girone E (3)	28	10	2	16	44	48	22	10th					n/a	
1940–41	Serie C Girone E (3)	29	9	5	15	48	64	23	13th					n/a	
1941–42	Serie C Girone E (3)	28	10	4	14	59	54	24	10th					n/a	
1942–43	Serie C Girone F (3)	20	6	3	11	26	52	14	10th					n/a	
1943–44	World War II														
1944–45	World War II														
1945–46	Lega Nazionale Centro-Sud Girone A (3)	26	13	6	7	38	30	32	3rd					n/a	
1946–47	Serie B Girone B (2)	40	18	11	11	54	38	47	3rd					Benito Lorenzi	15
1947–48	Serie B Girone C (2)	34	17	6	11	50	36	40	5th					Andrea Marzani	12
1948–49	Serie B (2)	42	15	8	19	53	76	38	17th					Egiziano Bertolucci	18
1949–50	Serie B (2)	42	14	7	21	51	69	35	19th					Francesco Grosso	10
1950–51	Serie C Girone C (3)	38	18	1	19	68	65	37	11th					n/a	
1951–52	Serie C Girone C (3)	34	17	11	6	60	24	45	2nd					n/a	
1952–53	Serie C (3)	34	13	11	10	49	37	37	5th					Carlo Maluta	13
1953–54	Serie C (3)	34	11	12	11	37	35	34	11th					Carlo Maluta	11
1954–55	Serie C (3)	34	15	7	12	52	42	37	4th					Giovanni Battista Fracassetti	9
1955–56	Serie C (3)	34	8	5	21	27	53	21	16th					Giuseppe Taddei	9
1956–57	IV Serie Girone E (4)	34	10	9	15	40	49	29	13th					n/a	
1957–58	Campionato Interregionale Girone E (5)	34	16	6	8	46	27	38	2nd					n/a	
1958–59	Campionato Interregionale Girone E (5)	34	16	15	13	45	28	47	2nd					n/a	
1959–60	Serie D Girone D (4)	34	10	9	15	28	40	29	15th					n/a	
1960–61	Serie D Girone A (4)	34	19	10	5	56	31	48	1st					n/a	
1961–62	Serie C Girone B (3)	34	10	7	17	32	51	27	18th					Publio Tognoni	9
1962–63	Serie D Girone D (4)	34	18	8	8	43	19	44	1st					n/a	
1963–64	Serie C Girone B (3)	34	15	9	10	32	18	39	4th					Claudio Veronesi	8
1964–65	Serie C Girone B (3)	34	12	9	13	35	32	33	9th					Fabio Ferrario	13
1965–66	Serie C Girone B (3)	34	9	14	11	26	33	32	8th					n/a	
1966–67	Serie C Girone B (3)	34	11	8	15	27	33	30	12th					Mario Zimolo	12
1967–68	Serie C Girone B (3)	38	9	18	11	24	28	36	12th					Leo Taccetti	13
1968–69	Serie C Girone B (3)	38	11	15	12	26	28	37	12th					Franco Pezzato	11
1969–70	Serie C Girone B (3)	38	11	19	8	33	27	41	5th					Gildo Rizzato	7
1970–71	Serie C Girone B (3)	38	9	16	13	27	29	34	13th					Silvio Rosa	13
1971–72	Serie C Girone B (3)	38	9	18	11	35	33	36	11th					Gaetano Salvemini	12
1972–73	Serie C Girone B (3)	38	11	17	10	28	25	39	9th					Gaetano Salvemini	14
1973–74	Serie C Girone B (3)	38	12	10	16	32	38	34	14th					Giuseppe Bressani	14
1974–75	Serie C Girone B (3)	38	13	13	12	29	32	39	10th					Antonio Bonaldi	12
1975–76	Serie C Girone B (3)	38	12	13	13	36	24	37	10th					Antonio Bonaldi	17
1976–77	Serie C Girone B (3)	38	12	10	16	39	38	34	17th					Ermanno Beccati	14
1977–78	Serie C Girone B (3)	38	14	10	14	39	35	38	10th					Ettore Donati	14
1978–79	Serie C1 Girone B (3)	34	8	16	10	30	29	32	9th					Osvaldo Zobbio	16
1979–80	Serie C1 Girone B (3)	34	9	15	10	21	22	33	10th					Vincenzo Amendola Marco Meloni	7
1980–81	Serie C1 Girone A (3)	34	14	10	10	32	32	38	5th					Antonio Ravot	9
1981–82	Serie C1 Girone A (3)	34	7	15	12	27	33	29	14th					Marco Meloni	7
1982–83	Serie C1 Girone B (3)	34	15	16	3	33	14	46	1st					Enrico Piccioni	9
1983–84	Serie B (2)	38	8	19	11	27	34	35	16th	1R				Gianfranco Cinello	10
1984–85	Serie B (2)	38	8	21	9	22	28	37	8th	R16				Gianfranco Cinello	11
1985–86	Serie B (2)	38	13	19	6	32	28	45	4th	QF				Luca Cecconi	16
1986–87	Serie A (1)	30	8	7	15	13	33	23	13th	R16				Francesco Baiano Johnny Ekström	3
1987–88	Serie A (1)	30	6	13	11	20	30	20	16th	QF				Enrico Cucchi	10
1988–89	Serie B (2)	38	8	18	12	29	33	34	17th	1R				Francesco Baiano	15
1989–90	Serie C1 Girone A (3)	34	13	17	4	31	19	43	3rd	1R				Beniamino Vignola	11
1990–91	Serie C1 Girone A (3)	34	14	10	10	34	32	38	4th	1R				Gaetano Musella	9
1991–92	Serie C1 Girone A (3)	34	11	17	6	39	25	39	5th	1R				Carmine Gautieri	10
1992–93	Serie C1 Girone A (3)	32	13	11	8	28	22	37	3rd	1R				Fabrizio Perrotti	8
1993–94	Serie C1 Girone A (3)	34	6	14	14	26	33	32	17th	1R				Roberto Marta Martino Melis	5
1994–95	Serie C1 Girone B (3)	34	8	16	10	32	30	40	11th					Vincenzo Montella	17
1995–96	Serie C1 Girone A (3)	34	17	11	5	44	24	62	3rd					Carmine Esposito	18
1996–97	Serie B (2)	38	17	13	8	45	34	64	2nd	2R				Massimiliano Cappellini	16
1997–98	Serie A (1)	34	10	7	17	50	58	37	12th	R32				Carmine Esposito	16
1998–99	Serie A (1)	34	4	10	20	26	63	22	18th	R32				Arturo Di Napoli	11
1999–2000	Serie B (2)	38	13	12	13	42	52	51	9th	GS				Luca Saudati	18
2000–01	Serie B (2)	38	18	10	10	52	43	64	6th	GS				Massimo Maccarone	18
2001–02	Serie B (2)	38	19	10	9	60	35	67	4th	2R				Antonio Di Natale	18
2002–03	Serie A (1)	34	9	11	14	36	46	38	13th	R16				Antonio Di Natale	14
2003–04	Serie A (1)	34	7	9	18	26	54	30	17th	2R				Tommaso Rocchi	11
2004–05	Serie B (2)	42	19	17	6	58	36	74	1st	GS				Francesco Tavano	19
2005–06	Serie A (1)	38	13	6	19	47	61	45	8th	3R				Francesco Tavano	20
2006–07	Serie A (1)	38	14	12	12	42	43	54	7th	QF				Luca Saudati	14
2007–08	Serie A (1)	38	9	9	20	29	52	36	18th	R16		UC	1R	Nicola Pozzi	10
2008–09	Serie B (2)	42	18	13	11	53	44	67	5th	R16				Francesco Lodi	18
2009–10	Serie B (2)	42	15	11	16	66	56	56	10th	4R				Éder	27
2010–11	Serie B (2)	42	13	18	11	46	39	57	9th	3R				Claudio Coralli	19
2011–12	Serie B (2)	42	12	11	19	48	59	47	18th	4R				Francesco Tavano	23
2012–13	Serie B (2)	42	20	13	9	69	51	73	4th	2R				Francesco Tavano	23
2013–14	Serie B (2)	42	20	12	10	59	35	72	2nd	3R				Francesco Tavano	22
2014–15	Serie A (1)	38	8	18	12	46	52	42	15th	R16				Massimo Maccarone	10
2015–16	Serie A (1)	38	12	10	16	40	49	46	10th	3R				Massimo Maccarone	13
2016–17	Serie A (1)	38	8	8	22	29	61	32	18th	4R				Massimo Maccarone Levan Mchedlidze	6
2017–18	Serie B (2)	42	24	13	5	88	49	85	1st	2R				Francesco Caputo	26
2018–19	Serie A (1)	38	10	8	20	51	70	38	18th	3R				Francesco Caputo	14
2019–20	Serie B (2)	38	14	12	12	47	48	54	7th	4R				Leonardo Mancuso	14
2020–21	Serie B (2)	38	19	16	3	68	35	73	1st	R16				Leonardo Mancuso	23
2021–22	Serie A (1)	38	10	11	17	50	70	41	14th	R16				Andrea Pinamonti	13
2022–23	Serie A (1)	38	10	13	15	37	49	43	14th	R64				Nicolò Cambiaghi	7
2023–24	Serie A (1)	38	9	9	20	29	54	36	17th	R64				M'Baye Niang	6
2024–25	Serie A (1)	38	6	13	19	33	59	31	18th	QF				Sebastiano Esposito	8
