= Schammel =

Schammel is a surname. Notable people with the surname include:

- Fernand Schammel (1923–1961), Luxembourgian footballer
- Zud Schammel (1910–1973), American football player
