= Robert Gausterer =

Austrian boxer (1928–1983)

Personal information
- Nationality: Austrian
- Born: 11 May 1928
- Died: 27 September 1983 (aged 55)

Sport
- Sport: Boxing

Robert Gausterer (11 May 1928 – 27 September 1983) was an Austrian boxer. He competed in the men's flyweight event at the 1948 Summer Olympics. At the 1948 Summer Olympics in London, he lost his only bout to Han Soo-ann of South Korea in the Round of 32. Gausterer died on 27 September 1983, at the age of 55.
