= Adone Stellin =

Italian footballer (1921-1996)

Personal information
- Date of birth: 3 March 1921
- Place of birth: Schio, Italy
- Date of death: 14 May 1996 (aged 75)
- Place of death: Padua, Italy
- Position: Defender

Senior career*
Years	Team	Apps	(Gls)
1939–1941	Udinese	6	(0)
1941–1942	Padova	?	(?)
1942–1943	Bassano Virtus	?	(?)
1944	Cormonese	5	(0)
1945–1947	Padova	47	(?)
1947–1948	Genoa	20	(?)
1948–1951	Bari	79	(0)
1951–1952	Toma Maglie	19	(0)
1952–1953	Bari	0	(0)

International career
1948	Italy	2	(1)
- * Club domestic league appearances and goals

Adone Stellin (Italian pronunciation: [aˈdoːne stelˈlin]; 3 March 1921 – 14 May 1996) was an Italian footballer who played as a defender. He competed in the men's tournament at the 1948 Summer Olympics.
