= Jimmy McIlvenny =

English footballer

Personal information
- Full name: James Robert McIlvenny
- Date of birth: 11 May 1891
- Place of birth: Tynemouth, England
- Height: 5 ft 9 1/2 in (1.77 m)
- Position: Striker

Youth career
- Willington Athletic

Senior career*
Years	Team	Apps	(Gls)
- South Shields
1911–1922	Bradford City	132	(26)
1922–1923	Blackpool	16	(4)
- * Club domestic league appearances and goals

James Robert McIlvenny (11 May 1892 – 1970) was an English professional footballer who was a forward spending most of his career at Bradford City.

== Career ==
McIlvenny was born in Tynemouth and started his football career at local clubs Willington Athletic and South Shields before moving to First Division side Bradford City in 1911, aged 18. In his first three seasons he played just 17 games scoring one goal.

By the 1913–14 season he started to feature more in the side, and he scored three goals in 17 games. In the last season before league football was abandoned because of the outbreak of the First World War he scored four goals in 30 league appearances. It was during the war that McIlvenny started to show his goal-scoring touch.

He scored 20 goals in 25 games in 1915–16, including five against both Hull City in an 8–4 win, and Rochdale in a 5–0 victory. He scored another two hat-tricks the following season among 26 goals from 32 games, before scoring another 12 from 28 in 1917–18. He managed just seven goals from 26 in the final season before league football returned, giving him a total return of 65 goals from 111 war-time appearances.

The first season after the war was his most productive in peace-time football when he was the club's top goal-scorer with 13 goals from 31 games. His return dropped to four from 31 in 1920–21 before he made just six appearances, scoring one goal in 1921–22 as Bradford City lost their top-flight status.

He was given a benefit match in February 1921 against West Bromwich Albion, before being sold to Blackpool in May 1922. McIlvenny finished his City career with 26 goals from 132 appearances, but when combined with war-time appearances, his 91 goals has only been surpassed by Bobby Campbell at City.

In his sixteen league-game career for Blackpool, McIlvenny scored four goals in just over a month: at Fulham in a 1–1 draw on 18 November 1922; in the return leg at Bloomfield Road seven days later in a 3–0 win for Blackpool; at home to Crystal Palace in a 4–0 victory for the hosts on 2 December; and at home to Leicester in a 2–1 defeat on Boxing Day. His last-ever appearance on the field occurred on 21 March 1923, in a single-goal defeat at his former club, South Shields. He retired at the end of the season.

McIlvenny's son, Harry, was also a professional footballer who played for Bradford Park Avenue and Bishop Auckland.
