= André Roosenburg =

Dutch footballer

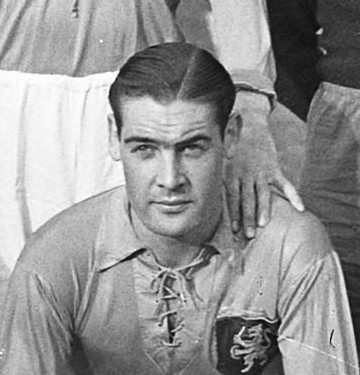
- André Roosenburg (1948)

Personal information
- Full name: Andries Hendrik Roosenburg
- Date of birth: 18 August 1923
- Place of birth: The Hague, Netherlands
- Date of death: 26 July 2002 (aged 78)
- Place of death: Franeker, Netherlands
- Position: Forward

Youth career
- VDS
- Triumf
- 1935–1940: ADO

Senior career*
| Years | Team | Apps | (Gls) |
| 1940–1943 | ADO | | |
| 1945–1947 | Neptunia | | |
| 1947–1950 | Sneek | | |
| 1950–1953 | Fiorentina | 59 | (18) |
| 1954–1955 | Sneek | | |
| 1955–1958 | Helmondia '55 | | |
| 1958–1959 | VV Leeuwarden | ? | (29) |
| 1959 | NEC | 1 | (0) |

International career
| 1948–1955 | Netherlands | 9 | (1) |
- * Club domestic league appearances and goals

Andries Hendrik "André" Roosenburg (18 August 1923 – 26 July 2002) was a Dutch footballer. He competed in the men's tournament at the 1948 Summer Olympics.

== Career ==
Born in The Hague, Roosenburg was discovered at a young age by ADO. He made his breakthrough at the club at the onset of World War II and twice won the Dutch league title with ADO. During the war, he went to Delfzijl where he would later play for VV Neptunia. After this, he played for VV Sneek and from there made a transfer to the Italian club Fiorentina. About his time in Italy, Roosenburg said: "That first match against Napoli went pretty well. Those guys had a mid-half, that was my direct opponent, who had just been suspended for a month. He started to file right away, so at one point I gave him a right [punch] on the liver… He immediately fell to the ground. There, they said there that I was the Dutch middleweight champion. I just left it that way."

Back in the Netherlands, he was suspended for playing professional football, which was disallowed at the time, and was therefore not allowed to return to the Netherlands until 1954, where the rules were changed. Once back, he played for Helmondia '55 and VV Leeuwarden, where he became the top goalscorer of the Eerste Divisie with 29 goals in the 1958–59 season. In 1959, he joined NEC where he suffered an injury in his first appearance and subsequently retired.

Roosenburg was capped nine times for the Netherlands national team, and took part in the 1948 Summer Olympics in London where he scored his only goal in a match against Ireland.

== Honours ==
ADO

- Netherlands Football League Championship: 1941–42, 1942–43

Individual

- Eerste Divisie Topscorer: 1958–59
