= Bobby Smith (Irish footballer) =

Irish footballer

Robert Patrick Smith (31 August 1922 – 27 March 1992) was an Irish soccer player during the 1940s.

Smith played for Bohemians during the 1940s in the League of Ireland and was a member of the 1945 Bohemian Inter City Cup winning team against Belfast Celtic at Dalymount Park. Smith joined a select group when he represented Ireland at the 1948 Olympic Games and scored a flying header against the Netherlands in the preliminary round. In 1951, he moved to Canada to join Toronto East End Canadians of the National Soccer League.
