= Ghasem Rasaeli =

Iranian boxer

Personal information
- Nationality: Iranian

Sport
- Sport: Boxing

Ghasem Rasaeli (Persian: قاسم رسائلی) was an Iranian boxer. He competed in the men's flyweight event at the 1948 Summer Olympics.
