= Carlomagno Meneses =

Peruvian boxer

Personal information
- Born: 6 October 1927; Lima, Peru
- Died: 3 December 2012 (aged 85); Lima, Peru

Sport
- Sport: Boxing

Carlomagno Meneses (6 October 1927 – 3 December 2012) was a Peruvian boxer. He competed in the men's flyweight event at the 1948 Summer Olympics.
