= William Barnes (boxer) =

Irish boxer

Personal information
- Nationality: Irish
- Born: 1924; Belfast, Northern Ireland
- Died: 31 August 2006 (aged 81–82); Belfast, Northern Ireland

Sport
- Sport: Boxing

William Edward Barnes (1924 – 31 August 2006) was an Irish boxer. He competed in the men's flyweight event at the 1948 Summer Olympics.
