= Des Williams =

South African boxer

Personal information
- Nationality: South African
- Born: 5 February 1928; Johannesburg, South Africa
- Died: 3 May 2011 (aged 83); Weltevredenpark, South Africa

Sport
- Sport: Boxing

Des Williams (5 February 1928 – 3 May 2011) was a South African boxer. He competed in the men's flyweight event at the 1948 Summer Olympics.
