= Lynn Road =

Football ground in Ilford, London, England

- Interactive map of Lynn Road
- Location: Ilford, London, England
- Coordinates: 51.571789°N 0.085117°E
- Owner: Ilford
- Surface: Grass
- Record attendance: 17,000

Construction
- Built: 1904
- Opened: 1904
- Closed: 1977

Tenant
- Ilford

Lynn Road was a football ground in the Newbury Park area of Ilford, London. It was the home ground of Ilford F.C. from 1904 until 1977 and hosted football matches during the 1948 Summer Olympics.

== History ==
The ground was built in 1904 after Ilford were given notice to leave their Wellesley Road ground. The first match at the new ground was played against Clapton in September that year, and in November a new 400-seat stand was opened on the southern side of the pitch. They bought the freehold of the site in 1922, and built another stand (which became known as the Clock Stand) on the northern side of the pitch, seating 600. The original stand was demolished in 1928 and replaced by an 850-seat stand that included a paddock with a standing capacity of 950.

The record attendance of 17,000 was set for an English Schools Trophy match between Ilford and Swansea in May 1952. By this time the ground had a capacity of 18,000. Floodlights were subsequently installed in 1962.

In the 1970s plans were made to relocate to a new ground near Fairlop tube station and the club left in the summer of 1977, with the main stand dismantled in order to be moved to the new site. However, the new ground never materialised and Ilford subsequently merged with Leytonstone to form Leytonstone/Ilford.

=== Olympic matches ===
Date	Time	Team #1	Result	Team #2	Round	Attendance
31 July 1948	18:30	France	2–1	India	First round	17,000
5 August 1948	18:30	Yugoslavia	3–1	Turkey	Second round	8,000
