= Marcel Paulus =

Luxembourgish footballer

Personal information
- Date of birth: 20 July 1920
- Place of birth: Grevenmacher, Luxembourg
- Date of death: 19 October 1987 (aged 67)
- Place of death: Ettelbruck, Luxembourg

International career
Years	Team	Apps	(Gls)
- Luxembourg

Marcel Paulus (20 July 1920 – 19 October 1987) was a Luxembourgish footballer. He competed in the men's tournament at the 1948 Summer Olympics.
