= Guillermo Porteiro =

Uruguayan boxer (1921–1984)

Personal information
- Full name: Guillermo Porteiro Mol
- Born: 7 April 1921 Montevideo, Uruguay
- Died: 30 September 1984 (aged 63) Montevideo, Uruguay

Sport
- Sport: Boxing

Guillermo Porteiro Mol (7 April 1921 – 30 September 1984) was a Uruguayan boxer. He competed in the men's flyweight event at the 1948 Summer Olympics. Porteiro died in Montevideo on 30 September 1984, at the age of 63.
