= Emidio Cavigioli =

Italian footballer (1925-2015)

Personal information
- Date of birth: 3 July 1925
- Place of birth: Omegna, Kingdom of Italy
- Date of death: 23 February 2015 (aged 89)
- Place of death: Busto Arsizio, Italy
- Height: 1.64 m (5 ft 4 1/2 in)
- Position: Forward

Senior career*
Years	Team	Apps	(Gls)
1942–1943	Sparta Novara		
1943–1944	Novara	7	(0)
1944–1951	Pro Patria		
1951–1952	Torino	8	(1)
1952–1956	Pro Patria	20	(2)

International career
1948	Italy	2	(3)
- * Club domestic league appearances and goals

Emidio Cavigioli (Italian pronunciation: [eˈmiːdjo kaviˈdʒɔːli]; 3 July 1925 – 23 February 2015) was an Italian professional footballer who played as a forward.

== Club career ==
Cavigioli played for 6 seasons (65 games, 13 goals) in the Italian Serie A for Aurora Pro Patria 1919 and A.C. Torino.

== International career ==
Cavigioli made his international debut for the Italy national football team in 1948 Summer Olympics, on 2 August 1948, in his nation's match against the United States, scoring two goals on his debut.
