= Luis Martínez (Spanish boxer) =

Spanish boxer (1925–2008)

Personal information
- Nationality: Spanish
- Born: 27 July 1925 Barcelona, Spain
- Died: 25 November 2008 (aged 83) Gard, France

Sport
- Sport: Boxing

Luis Martínez (27 July 1925 – 25 November 2008) was a Spanish boxer. He competed in the men's flyweight event at the 1948 Summer Olympics.
