= Alex Bollaert =

Belgian boxer (1930–2009)

Personal information
- Full name: Eugene Alexis Bollaert
- Nationality: Belgian
- Born: 11 January 1930 Antwerp, Belgium
- Died: 2 May 2009 (aged 79) Antwerp, Belgium

Sport
- Sport: Boxing

Eugene Alexis Bollaert (11 January 1930 – 2 May 2009) was a Belgian boxer. He competed in the men's flyweight event at the 1948 Summer Olympics. Bollaert died in Antwerp on 2 May 2009, at the age of 79.
