= Maxim Cochin =

French boxer

Personal information
- Nationality: French
- Born: 27 May 1927; Angers, France
- Died: 22 August 2000 (aged 73); Angers, France

Sport
- Sport: Boxing

Maxime Camille Cochin (27 May 1927 – 22 August 2000) was a French boxer. He competed in the men's flyweight event at the 1948 Summer Olympics.
