= Fernando Figueroa (footballer) =

Mexican footballer (1925-2011)

Personal information
- Full name: Fernando Antonio Figueroa Rodríguez
- Date of birth: 2 July 1925
- Date of death: 22 February 2011 (aged 85)

International career
Years	Team	Apps	(Gls)
- Mexico

Fernando Antonio Figueroa Rodríguez (2 July 1925 – 22 February 2011) was a Mexican footballer. He competed in the men's tournament at the 1948 Summer Olympics.
