= Bill Amor =

English footballer

Personal information
- Full name: William George Amor
- Date of birth: 6 November 1919
- Place of birth: Pewsey, England
- Date of death: 1 May 1988 (aged 68)
- Place of death: Reading, Berkshire, England
- Position: Winger

Senior career*
Years	Team	Apps	(Gls)
- Huntley & Palmers
1947–1952	Reading	66	(12)
- Metropolitan Police

International career
1948	Great Britain	1	(1)
- * Club domestic league appearances and goals

William George Amor (6 November 1919 – 1 May 1988) was an English amateur footballer who represented Great Britain at the 1948 Summer Olympics, making one appearance. Although he spent the majority of his career in non-league football with teams such as Huntley & Palmers and Metropolitan Police, Amor made 66 appearances in the Football League for Reading between 1947 and 1952.
