= Choi Seong-gon =

South Korean footballer (1922–1951)

Personal information
- Date of birth: 6 May 1922
- Place of birth: Ulsan, Korea, Empire of Japan (now Ulsan, South Korea)
- Date of death: 1951 (aged 28–29)
- Position: Midfielder

Senior career*
Years	Team	Apps	(Gls)
- Korea Electric Power

International career
1948	South Korea	3	(1)
- * Club domestic league appearances and goals

Choi Seong-gon (6 May 1922 – 1951) was a South Korean footballer who played as a midfielder. He competed in the men's tournament at the 1948 Summer Olympics.
