= Lee Sang-hun (basketball) =

South Korean basketball player

Personal information
- Nationality: South Korean

Sport
- Sport: Basketball

Lee Sang-hun was a South Korean basketball player. He competed in the men's tournament at the 1948 Summer Olympics.
