= Gang Bong-hyeon =

South Korean basketball player

Personal information
- Nationality: South Korean

Sport
- Sport: Basketball

Gang Bong-hyeon was a South Korean basketball player. He competed in the men's tournament at the 1948 Summer Olympics.
