= Bob Hardisty =

English footballer

Personal information
- Full name: John Roderick Elliot Hardisty
- Date of birth: 1 December 1921
- Place of birth: Chester-le-Street, England
- Date of death: 31 October 1986 (aged 64)
- Place of death: Durham, England
- Position: Wing half

Senior career*
Years	Team	Apps	(Gls)
1939–1946	Bishop Auckland	?	(?)
1946–1949	Darlington	6	(0)
1949–1957	Bishop Auckland	?	(?)
1958	Manchester United	0	(0)

International career
1948–1956	Great Britain	6	(3)
- * Club domestic league appearances and goals

John Roderick Elliot "Bob" Hardisty (1 December 1921 – 31 October 1986) was an English amateur footballer who represented Great Britain at the Olympics in 1948, 1952 and 1956, making a total of six appearances.

Hardisty spent the majority of his career with Bishop Auckland, winning the Northern League seven times. Hardisty also won the FA Amateur Cup three times between 1955 and 1957.

Hardisty also made 6 appearances in the Football League for Darlington between 1946 and 1949.

Hardisty briefly came out of retirement in 1958 to play for Manchester United following the Munich air disaster, although he never made a league appearance for them.

Hardisty later became a football coach and worked with Matt Busby. He was portrayed by the actor Liam Shannon in the 2011 BBC TV drama United.
