= Jo Deuk-jun =

South Korean basketball player

Personal information
- Nationality: South Korean
- Born: 1915
- Died: 1958 (aged 42–43)

Sport
- Sport: Basketball

Jo Deuk-jun (1915 – 1958) was a South Korean basketball player. He competed in the men's tournament at the 1948 Summer Olympics.
