= Johannes Pløger =

Danish footballer (1922-1991)

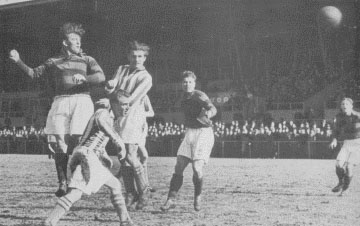
- (second from the right)

Personal information
- Full name: Johannes Theodor Louis Pløger
- Date of birth: 3 April 1922
- Place of birth: Frederiksberg, Denmark
- Date of death: 4 February 1991 (aged 68)
- Place of death: Frederiksberg, Denmark
- Position: Right winger

Youth career
- FKIF
- 1924–1939: Frem

Senior career*
Years	Team	Apps	(Gls)
1939–1948	Frem	164	(101)
1948–1949	Juventus	16	(1)
1949–1950	Novara	22	(6)
1950–1951	Torino	25	(2)
1951–1954	Udinese	75	(8)

International career
1940–1948	Denmark	21	(8)
- * Club domestic league appearances and goals

Johannes Theodor Louis Pløger (3 April 1922 – 4 February 1991), commonly known as Johannes Pløger, was a Danish professional footballer, who most notably played professionally as a winger for Italian clubs Juventus and Udinese. He played 21 games and scored eight goals for the Denmark national football team, with whom he won a bronze medal at the 1948 Summer Olympics.

== Biography ==
Born in Frederiksberg in Copenhagen, Pløger started his senior career with Boldklubben Frem. He became the wunderkind of Danish football at the age of 18, when helped Frem win the 1940 Danish Cup, and made his debut for the Danish national team in October 1940. Pløger was called the Aladdin of Danish football, with his happy-go-lucky dribbling runs.

He was a part of the Frem teams that won the 1941 and 1944 Danish championship trophies, and was selected to represent Denmark at the 1948 Olympics. He scored two goals in four games as Denmark won bronze medals, and was one of several Danish footballers who was bought by professional Italian clubs after the Olympics had ended. He played his last Danish national team game in October 1948, as the Danish rules of amateurism prohibited him from representing his country as a professional player.

In the same year 1948 he joined Juventus in the italian Serie A, after a quick 40 billions lire transfer. Pløger was optioned by Milan, and as a repair Gianni Agnelli, president of the bianconeri team, sold the option he had on the swedish forward Nordahl.

Despite the high transfer fee, in Italy Pløger did not make as great an impact as some of the other Danes, who were brought in from the 1948 Olympic team. He was too slow to dazzle with his skills in the Italian game, and lost some of his confidence. He played one season each for Juventus FC, Novara Calcio, and Torino Calcio, before ending his career with three seasons at Udinese Calcio. After finishing his professional career in Italy, Pløger settled as a Ford car dealer in Frederiksberg. He died in February 1991, 69 years old.

== Honours ==
Olympic medal record

Men's Football
Bronze medal – third place	1948 London	Team competition

- Danish Championships: 1940-41 and 1943-44 with Frem
- Danish Cup: 1940 with Frem
