= Joey Sandulo =

Canadian boxer (1931–2019)

Personal information
- Born: 5 May 1931; Ottawa, Ontario, Canada
- Died: 13 December 2019 (aged 88)

Sport
- Sport: Boxing

Joseph Oleg Sandulo (5 May 1931 – 13 December 2019) was a Canadian boxer. He competed in the men's flyweight event at the 1948 Summer Olympics.
