= Mohamed Mohamed Habib =

Egyptian basketball player (1914–2007)

Personal information
- Nationality: Egyptian
- Born: November 11, 1914 Alexandria, Egypt
- Died: December 5, 2007 (aged 93)

Sport
- Sport: Basketball

Mohamed Mohamed Habib (Arabic: محمد محمد حبيب; 11 November 1914 – 5 December 2007) was an Egyptian basketball player. He competed in the men's tournament at the 1948 Summer Olympics.
