= Rabin Bhatta =

Indian boxer

Personal information
- Full name: Rabindranath Bhatta
- Nationality: Indian
- Born: 1924
- Died: 6 July 2004 (aged 79–80); Kolkata, West Bengal, India

Sport
- Sport: Boxing

Rabindranath "Rabin" Bhatta (1924 – 6 July 2004) was an Indian boxer. He competed in the men's flyweight event at the 1948 Summer Olympics.
