= Fernand Schammel =

Luxembourgish footballer

Personal information
- Date of birth: 30 March 1923
- Place of birth: Luxembourg, Luxembourg
- Date of death: 17 May 1961 (aged 38)
- Place of death: Luxembourg, Luxembourg
- Position: Forward

Senior career*
| Years | Team | Apps | (Gls) |
| 1945–1950 | Union Luxembourg | | |

International career
| 1946–1949 | Luxembourg | 12 | (3) |
- * Club domestic league appearances and goals

Fernand Schammel (30 March 1923 – 17 May 1961) was a Luxembourgish footballer. He competed in the men's tournament at the 1948 Summer Olympics.

== Career statistics ==
=== International goals ===
| # | Date | Venue | Opponent | Score | Result | Competition |
|---|---|---|---|---|---|---|
| 1. | 18 April 1948 | Stade Municipal, Luxembourg City, Luxembourg | Czechoslovakia | 1–4 | 2–4 | Friendly |
| 2. | 26 July 1948 | Goldstone Ground, Brighton, England | Afghanistan | 3–0 | 6–0 | 1948 Summer Olympics |
| 3. | 31 July 1948 | Craven Cottage, London, England | Yugoslavia | 1–0 | 1–6 | 1948 Summer Olympics |
Correct as of 7 October 2019
