= Ingemar Burgström =

Swedish boxer

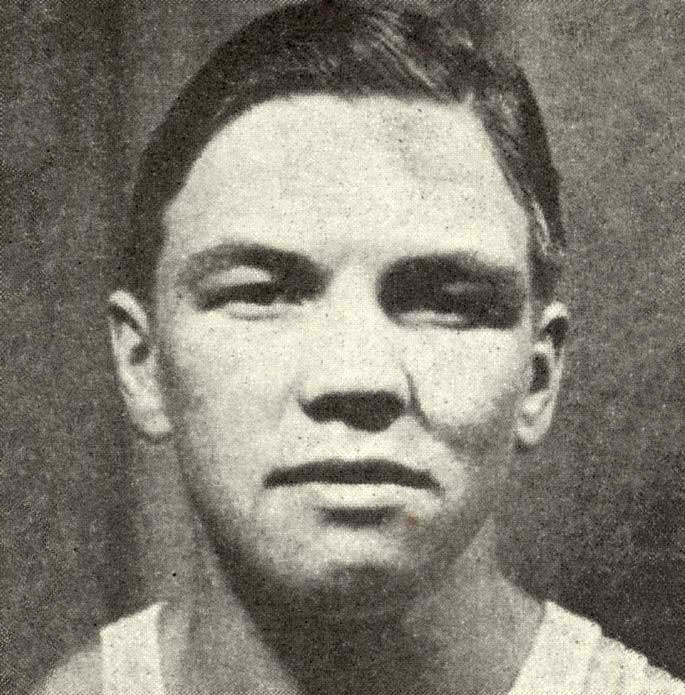

Personal information
- Born: 5 March 1926 Sollefteå, Sweden
- Died: 9 July 1951 (aged 25) Stockholm, Sweden

Sport
- Sport: Boxing
- Club: BK Örnen, Stockholm

Paul Ingemar Burgström (5 March 1926 – 9 July 1951) was a Swedish flyweight boxer. He competed at the 1948 Summer Olympics, but was eliminated in the first round.

== 1948 Olympic results ==
Below is the record of Ingemar Burgström, a Swedish flyweight boxer who competed at the 1948 London Olympics:

- Round of 32: lost to Des Williams (South Africa) on points
