= Great Britain Olympic football team =

Great Britain
- Nickname: Team GB
- Association: The Football Association (since 1907)
- Most caps: Jim Lewis; Mike Pinner (11)
- Top scorer: Will Campbell (10)
- FIFA code: GBR
First colours	Second colours

First international
- (United Kingdom) Great Britain 12–1 Sweden (London, Great Britain; 20 October 1908)

Biggest win
- (United Kingdom) Great Britain 12–1 Sweden (London, Great Britain; 20 October 1908)

Biggest defeat
- Bulgaria 6–1 Great Britain (United Kingdom) (Melbourne, Australia; 30 November 1956); Bulgaria 5–0 Great Britain (United Kingdom) (Sofia, Bulgaria; 5 May 1971)

Olympic Games
- Appearances: 8 (first in 1900)
- Best result: Gold: 1900,1908, 1912
Medal record
Olympic Games
Gold medal – first place	1900 Paris	Team
Gold medal – first place	1908 London	Team
Gold medal – first place	1912 Stockholm	Team

The Great Britain Olympic football team was the men's football team that represented the United Kingdom at the Summer Olympic Games (where it competed as Great Britain, branded Team GB). There are no current plans to reform the team. The team was organised by the Football Association (the FA) as the men's footballing representative of the British Olympic Association. The team only competes in the Olympic Games. In other international football tournaments, the Home Nations of the United Kingdom are represented by their own national teams, a situation which pre-dated the establishment of a GB team.

The team first competed at the FA organised tournament for the 1908 Olympics held in London, which was the first games that featured representative teams using players selected nationally (prior games in 1900 and 1904 used club teams). This team and the two that followed in 1912 and 1920 featured only English amateur players, and is seen by some as merely an extension of the English amateur team, set up in 1906 in response to the rise of the professional game. In this period the team won the gold medal at the 1908 and 1912 tournaments, although exited at Round 1 in 1920. A dispute between the FA and FIFA over the inclusion of professionals saw the FA withdraw from Olympic football in 1924 and 1928, and saw no football at the Olympics at all in 1932.

After the creation of the FIFA World Cup, it was agreed that Olympic football would become exclusively amateur, leading to the team competing again in the 1936 Games, this time incorporating players from other Home Nations. After the break caused by World War II, the team then competed in every games from 1948 until 1972, albeit failing to qualify for the main tournament after 1960. In this period the team's best performance was fourth place in 1948 at the second Games hosted in London, under manager Matt Busby.

After the FA abolished the distinction between amateur and professional players in 1974, it stopped entering a team. By the 1992 Games teams could use professionals, but were restricted to players under 23 years old, with only three over-age players allowed per squad. Despite this change, Great Britain did not enter a football team again until London won the right to host the 2012 Games. The FA organised the team, with Stuart Pearce appointed manager.

A Great Britain women's team also competed at the 2012 and 2020 Games, following the introduction of women's football to the Games in 1996.

== History ==
=== Origins ===
The FA was formed in London 1863, when thirteen teams met to draw up a shared rule list for football, in order to facilitate matches between clubs. The question of the geographical remit of this organisation does not appear to have been asked, with the FA being formed before the rise of international football. The first football matches between national teams were arranged by the FA, who invited English and Scottish players to form representative teams. The Scottish teams were made up almost entirely of Scottish residents in England and in order to encourage more Scottish based players to compete, an organisation in Scotland was sought to form the Scottish team. For the 1872 game between Scotland and England in Glasgow, Queen's Park Football Club took on this role, and this game is now recognised as the first international match. Within a year, the Scottish Football Association (SFA) was founded to facilitate these matches, and to organise football in Scotland more broadly. The third national football association, the Football Association of Wales was founded in 1876 and a fourth, the Irish Football Association, (IFA), was founded in 1880.

The practice of playing internationals between the four countries of the United Kingdom (also known as the home nations) was thus developed before football associations were developed elsewhere in the world and, no 'United Kingdom football association' was ever formed. Outside of the UK, the first national associations were formed in 1889 (in Denmark and the Netherlands), and these also began to pick their own national teams. When football was included at the 1900 Olympics, however, many nations were still struggling to raise a team, and so club teams entered instead. Upton Park represented the UK, winning the gold medal.

=== 1908–1936: First tournaments and Olympic Gold ===
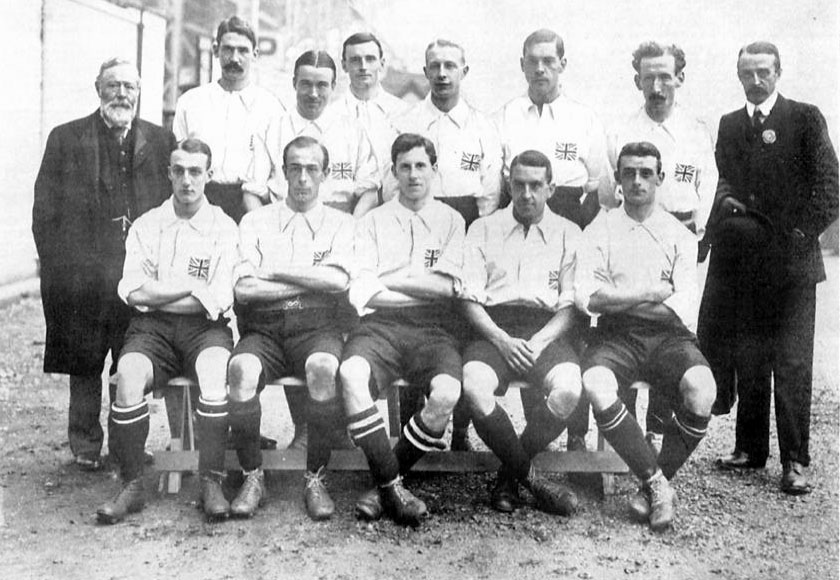
Great Britain squad that won the gold medal in 1908

For the 1908 Olympic Games in London, the FA persuaded the IOC to include an official football tournament, which they organised. A team, made up entirely of English players, was entered. Some sources continue to refer to this team as the England national amateur football team, whilst others still simply label all participations as Great Britain. Although the team competed as the United Kingdom and are listed as such, the official match report refers to "the English team". The Scottish Football Association passed a resolution to "protest against one National body in the British Isles being termed the United Kingdom, or playing as such without the consent of the other three National Associations". The resolution was read at the next meeting of the International Football Association Board. In response, "[t]he Football Association representatives explained that this was the name given by the authorities, and that so far as the Football Association was concerned they had nothing to do with the matter. The Scottish Association were satisfied with this answer."

At the 1908 Olympics, "Great Britain and Ireland" won all three of their matches, defeating Sweden and Netherlands in the first two rounds. They met Denmark in the final, defeating them 2–0 with goals from Vivian Woodward and Frederick Chapman.

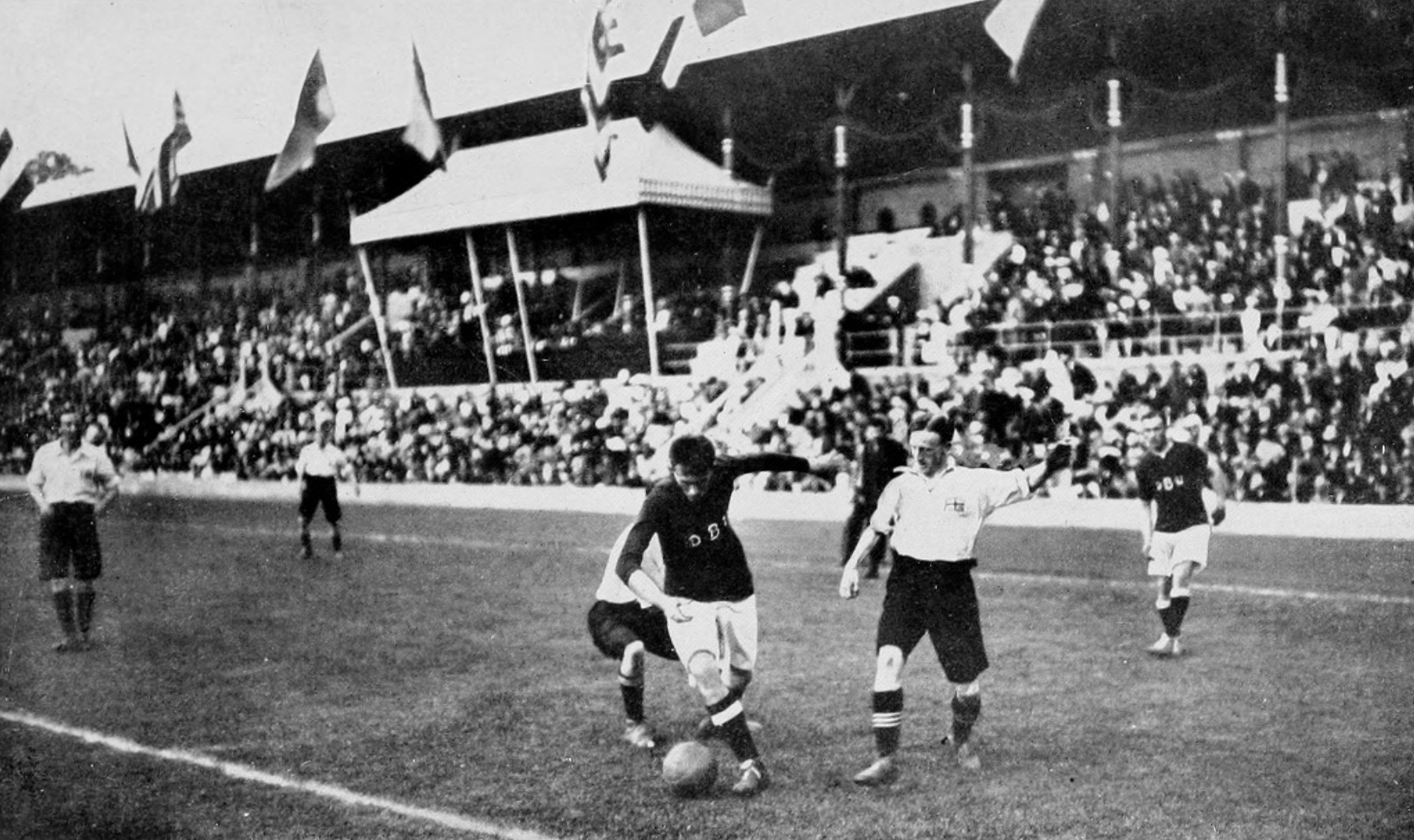
Scene of the 1912 Olympic Final match where Great Britain won its second Gold after beating Denmark 4–2

The team repeated this success at the 1912 Games. Again, Britain won all three matches and defeated Denmark in the final, this time 4–2. Woodward, who scored in the previous final, was captain for this tournament.

At the 1920 Summer Games, Britain lost in the first round in a surprise defeat to Norway. Britain had played only amateur players, while other nations selected their team from all available players. The tournament formed part of a rift which developed between the FA, who wanted the Olympics to remain an amateur only competition, and FIFA, who were keen on having a full football world championship. This resulted in the FA leaving FIFA, as well as withdrawing from the 1924 and 1928 football tournaments. Eventually, however, an agreement was reached in which the Olympic football tournament would be for amateur players only, with the FIFA World Cup created to include all players, professional and amateur.

There was no football tournament at the 1932 games, so Britain's return to Olympic football came at the 1936 Summer Olympics. Great Britain were defeated in the quarter-finals, losing 5–4 to Poland.

=== 1948–1972: Post war tournaments ===
Following the Second World War, Great Britain competed in all Olympic football tournaments from 1948 through to 1972. The 1948 tournament, which was hosted in London, was the team's most successful. By this time, it was recognised that Britain's amateur players were not of the same quality as they had been in earlier years, due to the rise of the professional game. By contrast, teams in nations which had not yet developed professional leagues were able to field their strongest sides. Manager Matt Busby trained a squad made up of players from all of the 'home nations', and Britain progressed to the semi-final with wins over the Netherlands and France. Having lost the semi-final to Yugoslavia, Britain once again faced Denmark. This time, however, they were defeated 5–3 and missed out on a bronze medal. Wembley Stadium hosted Great Britain's final two matches, though they also played at Craven Cottage and Highbury.

After 1948, Great Britain were never a significant threat at the Olympics again. They were eliminated after losing their opening match to Luxembourg in 1952, and qualified for the 1956 only after other teams withdrew, before being beaten by Bulgaria in the quarter-finals. Their final appearance at an Olympic Games came in 1960. The squad was again selected from all of the home nations, with matches between the national amateur sides being used to choose a best 19. Great Britain were eliminated in the first round, losing one, drawing one and winning one of their three matches. After that Great Britain failed to qualify for the next three Olympics, with their final match being a 5–0 qualifying round defeat by Bulgaria in 1971 following a 1–0 victory at Wembley Stadium against the same team.

In 1974, the Football Association stopped recognising a distinction between professionals and amateurs, with all player subsequently registered simply as 'players', whether paid or unpaid. This ended the existence of the England amateur team, which had always been the basis for the British Olympic team. As such, the FA stopped entering a football team into Olympic competition.

=== 1976–2008: Absence from the tournament ===
For the 1984 Summer Olympics, professional footballers were allowed to compete at the Olympics for the first time. Initially, European and South American teams were banned from playing players who had competed in the FIFA World Cup, but from the 1992 Summer Olympics eligibility for all nations was restricted to players aged under 23, except that three players of any age are allowed in the squad.

Since 1992, the UEFA European Under-21 Championship has acted as the qualifying tournament for the UEFA nations, which each of the Home Nations enter. On four occasions, teams from Great Britain have finished in the qualifying positions:

- 1992 – Scotland
- 1996 – Scotland
- 2008 – England
- 2024 – England

In March 1996, the Scottish National Party proposed that the Scotland U21s should compete in the 1996 Olympics football tournament, having finished fourth in the 1996 UEFA European Under-21 Championship. Scotland would have qualified for the Summer Olympics football tournament twice in succession, having also finished fourth in the 1992 edition. The Scottish Football Association (SFA) opposed the idea of the Scotland team being sent to the Olympics as they would have had to participate as Great Britain, which the SFA considered would have jeopardised the independent status of Scottish national teams.

The British Olympic Association initially refused to rule out the possibility of entry for the 2008 Games, England would have qualified for the 2008 Olympics by reaching the semi-finals of the 2007 Under–21 Championship, but a team was not entered. Italy took their vacated place by winning a play-off match against Portugal. The England women's team also qualified for the 2008 Olympics, through their performance in the 2007 World Cup, but they were denied a place at the Olympics because the other three Home Nations refused to give their consent.

=== Reformation for London 2012 ===
The BOA released a supporters' shirt for fans of Team GB

Due to the success of the London 2012 Olympic bid, the United Kingdom gained the right to enter a team in the football tournament as host nation. The British Olympic Association (BOA) stated it would enter a football team, but the Scottish Football Association (SFA) refused even to attend meetings at which the Home Nations were to discuss the possibility and the Football Association of Wales (FAW) withdrew from the negotiations. The Irish Football Association (representing Northern Ireland) stated in October 2007 that they would not take part in a unified team, leaving the Football Association (England) as the only association willing to take part. The SFA's opposition to the plans were rooted primarily in the fear that the Home Nations would be forced to field a combined team in all competitions. This would mean the loss of the special status of the Home Nations, established under FIFA's constitution.

Various fans, politicians and sports-people all gave their opinions with regards to the creation of a team. A 2005 opinion poll published by the BOA claimed that a majority of Scots supported the creation of a British team for the 2012 Olympics. A joint statement issued by the official fan clubs of all four Home Nations voiced their opposition to the plan. Various prominent politicians also offered their opinion as to whether there should be a British team in the 2012 Olympics. Prime Minister Gordon Brown stated during the 2008 Olympics that he wanted a British team and would work towards that happening, although he acknowledged that it could affect the autonomy of the Home Nations. First Minister of Scotland Alex Salmond then stated his opposition to a British team, arguing that Brown must be "seriously out of touch with Scotland" to support it.

FIFA President Sepp Blatter initially assured each of the British Associations that their status would not be affected by fielding a combined team in 2012. The SFA refused to change its position, arguing that Blatter's personal opinion and permission might not matter once he has left office, and that they did not wish to jeopardise their status. Blatter seemed to change his view in March 2008, when he stated that "they should enter only a team composed of players from England" and he suggested that the independent status of the four British associations could be harmed by a unified team. UEFA chief executive David Taylor, a former chief executive of the SFA, said in August 2008 that a British Olympic team would threaten the existence of the individual home nations. Taylor also said that the unique status of the Home Nations had come under attack before from other FIFA members, and that it was "difficult to see what guarantees could be given" to protect that status. At a conference held in conjunction with the 2008 FIFA Club World Cup in Japan, the prospect of a UK team for the 2012 Olympics was discussed by the FIFA Executive Committee, who gave their approval.

The executive committee confirmed that the participation in the 2012 London Olympic Games of a single team representing Great Britain would not affect the existing individual status of the four British football associations. For the Olympic Games, they have to play in one entity. The ball is now in their turf. We expect a solution that will be presented to us for the month of March.

From the world of sport, world 400 m hurdles champion Dai Greene said that he felt that there should not be an Olympic football tournament because the Olympics is not the pinnacle of that sport. He also expressed fears that coverage of the football team would overshadow interest in the other competitors. Sebastian Coe, the director of the 2012 Olympics, regularly spoke out in support of the team.

A compromise was eventually reached between the four associations, whereby a squad of English players only would represent the United Kingdom. The football associations of Northern Ireland, Scotland and Wales sent a joint letter to FIFA stating that they would not participate, but that they would not object to England participating alone. This agreement was challenged by the BOA, who wanted to select players from all four countries and claimed it would be potentially discriminatory to only select English players. Jim Boyce stated that there is no legal restriction on players being selected by the BOA and the SFA admitted that it would have no legal grounds to prevent Scottish players from participating. It was then confirmed that the FA intended to select players from outside England. Eligible non-English players such as Gareth Bale and Aaron Ramsey expressed their desire to play in the squad, having posed for a photo-shoot wearing the replica shirts of the team.

==== Pre-tournament preparations ====
The FA announced in October 2011 that Stuart Pearce would be the manager. After this announcement, Pearce drew up an initial long-list of players who he wanted to consider for the squad, and wrote to all of these players to inform them of his choice. Pearce said that players who did not want to be included would be able to inform him of their wishes at that stage. It was stated in December 2011 that none of the players selected for the England squad for the UEFA Euro 2012 would be selected, in order to avoid player fatigue. In January 2012, it was revealed that 191 players had been contacted, with 7 declining to be considered for the team. A further cut was announced in April 2012, with the shortlist of eligible players reduced to around 80. The final pre-tournament cut occurred in early June, when a squad of 35 players was submitted to FIFA.

Great Britain were placed in group A for the Olympic tournament prior to the draw. The draw was held on 24 April 2012 and added Uruguay, United Arab Emirates and Senegal to Great Britain's group. The final 18-man squad for the Olympic Games was announced on 2 July 2012. A pre-tournament training camp was held in Marbella, Spain. This included a training match against Mexico, which Mexico won 1–0. All players in the squad played for between 45 and 75 minutes. The team then played one official friendly match, against Brazil at the Riverside Stadium in Middlesbrough on 20 July, which was won 2–0 by Brazil.

==== Olympic tournament ====
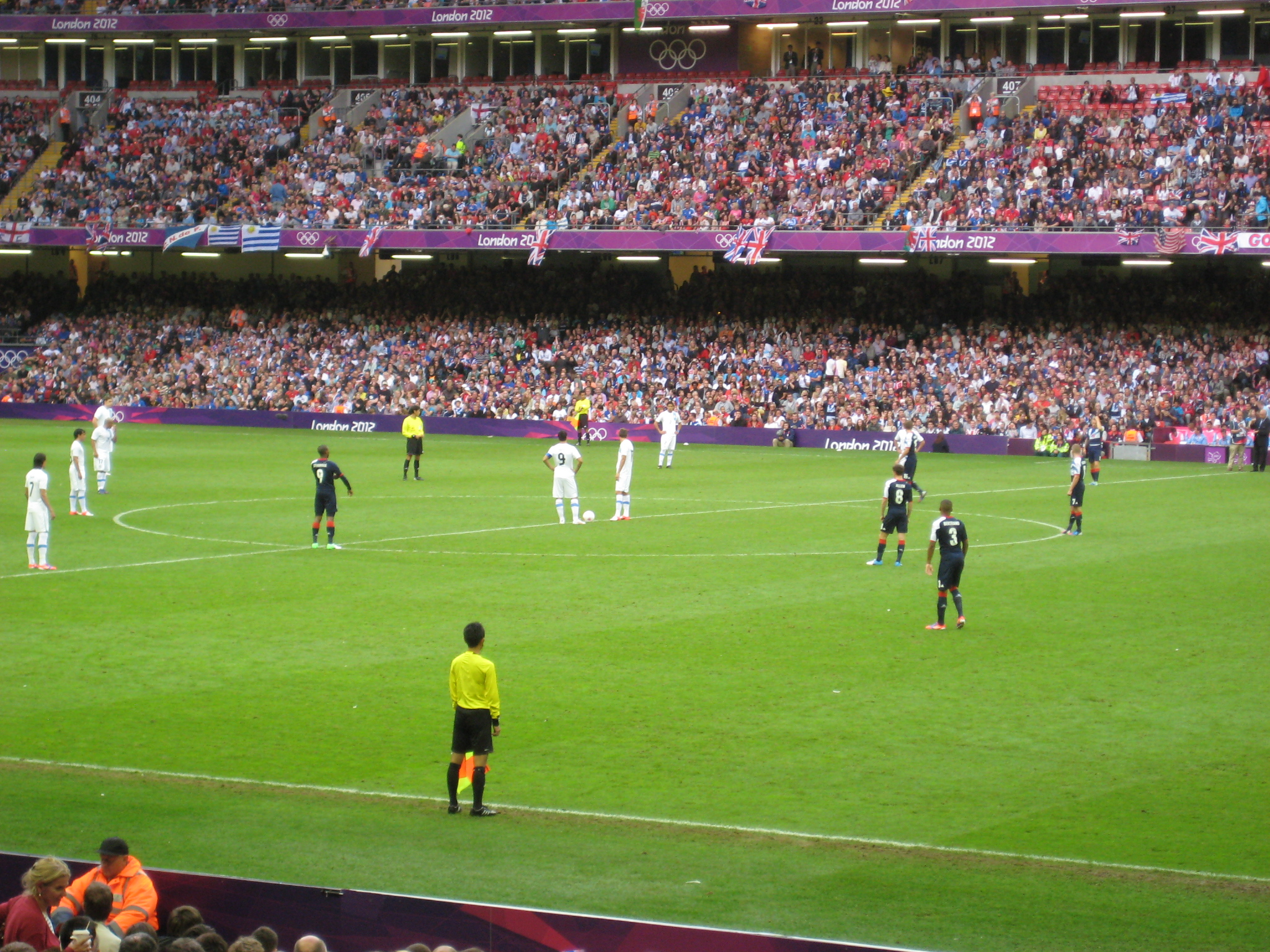
Kick-off vs Uruguay at the Millennium Stadium

Great Britain's first match was a 1–1 draw with Senegal at Old Trafford in Manchester on 26 July. Craig Bellamy scored for Great Britain in the first half, but Pape Moussa Konaté scored the equaliser for Senegal from a counter-attack in the 82nd minute. Their second match was a 3–1 win against the United Arab Emirates at Wembley. A Ryan Giggs header put Great Britain in the lead, before Ahmad Ali equalised. Scott Sinclair regained the lead with his first touch of the game after coming on as a substitute, and minutes later, fellow substitute Daniel Sturridge chipped the UAE's goalkeeper to make it 3–1. Sturridge scored again in the 1–0 victory against Uruguay in their final group game.

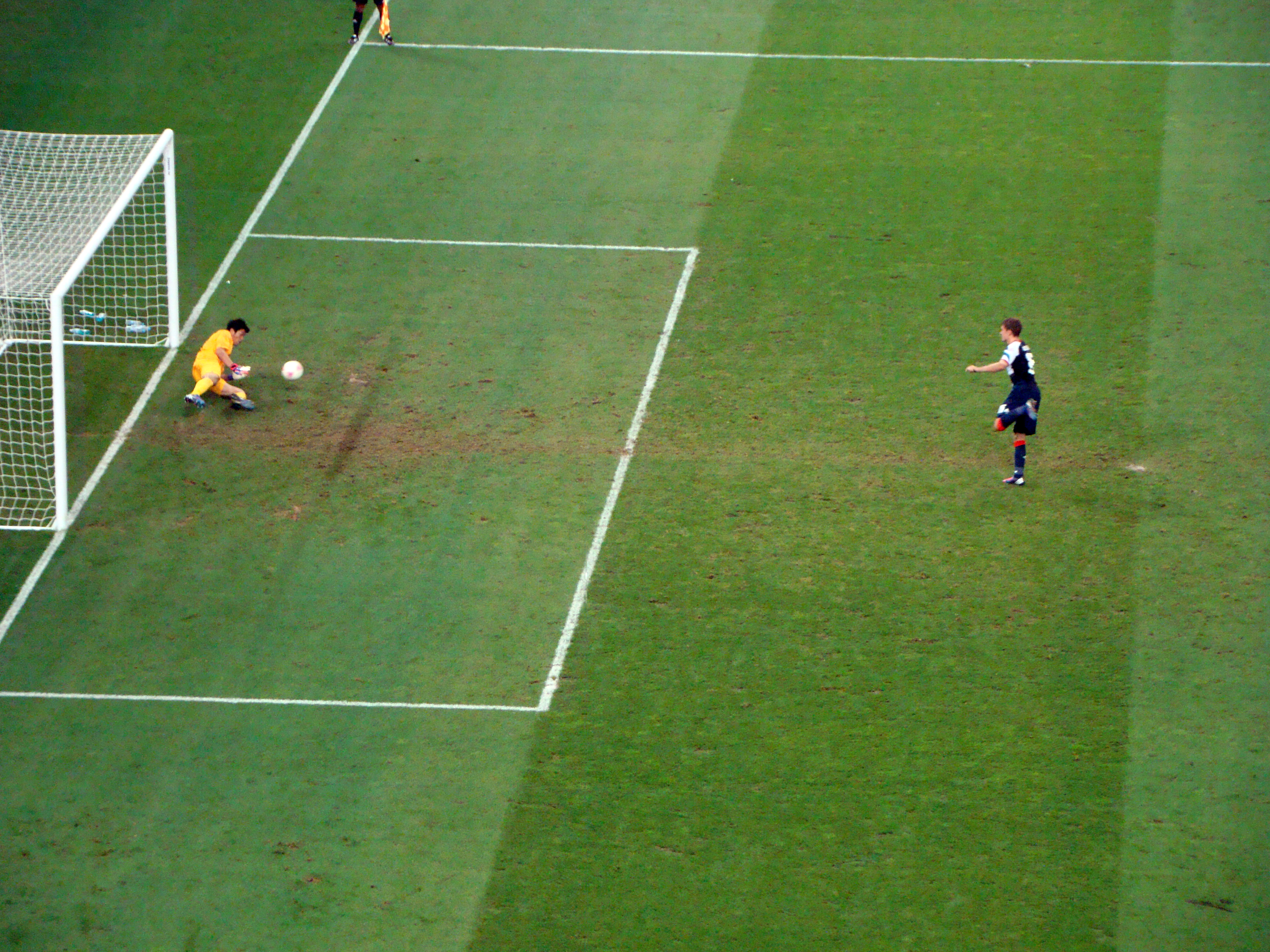
Aaron Ramsey missed a penalty kick against South Korea in the 40th minute.

In the knockout stage, Great Britain played South Korea in the quarterfinal round. The match went to a penalty shoot-out after the score was 1–1, after extra time. Great Britain lost the shoot-out 4–5 after Sturridge missed Britain's fifth attempt, while the Koreans converted all five of their attempts.

=== 2016–present: Negotiations for permanent reformation ===
During the 2012 tournament some players such as Ryan Giggs and some members of the British Olympic Association expressed a desire to enter a football team in future Olympics. After Great Britain's elimination from the 2012 Olympics, there were no public plans to reform the team for future Olympic Games, with Alex Horne, chief-executive of the FA, stating that the FA would not support a future men's football team at the Olympics. The problem facing any possible future Great Britain team is that there is no mechanism for it to qualify, as the individual home nations compete in the qualifying competition.

In 2015, the England under-21 coach Gareth Southgate and the FA Director of Elite Development Dan Ashworth established as FA policy that the Olympic tournament is a valuable experience for underage players. The FA subsequently advised the other home nations that they intended to enter teams in 2016, if either or both of the England teams met the qualification standard. This suggestion was opposed by the Scottish, Welsh and Northern Irish associations. Jim Boyce of Northern Ireland, then a vice-president of FIFA, said that he had an assurance that any future Great Britain teams would require the consent of all home nations. The FA then advised the other home nations that they would not enter teams, with the Scottish FA saying that the FA had "underestimated" opposition to the plan.

After Team GB did not enter a team at the 2016 Olympics, British Olympic Association chief executive Bill Sweeney expressed his disappointment and said talks would take place to try to field teams for the 2020 Tokyo Olympics. British Olympic Association vice-chairman and former sports minister Sir Hugh Robertson further stated: "From the British Olympic Committee's perspective, we would love to see Team GB football", whilst new England senior team manager Sam Allardyce stated: "To turn it down is a great shame. It's something we may look at in the future and try to compete in." Joint talks between all four of the home nations began in September 2016. FIFA subsequently approved the idea of a Great Britain team for the 2020 games, but opposition from the Welsh, Scottish and Northern Irish FAs continued. FA chief executive Martin Glenn established that previous concerns over the existence of a team were no longer a concern, stating: "The big fear in the past was that if we did it we would jeopardise our independent country status. But that was sorted out under [former FIFA president Sepp] Blatter actually and Gianni Infantino has reinforced it." Glenn revealed that "FIFA has indicated that it's not a problem" and that "the issue is the individual interests of each home nation."

An agreement was reached between the four associations for a women's team to be entered in the 2020 Summer Olympics, with qualification depending on England's performance in the 2019 World Cup, but this did not affect men's football.

Following Tokyo 2020, Sky Sports reported that the British Olympic Association had hoped to have a men's team at Paris 2024. However, nothing came of this, as no confirmation of Great Britain either competing or not competing, despite England finishing in a qualification spot at the 2023 UEFA European Under-21 Championship.

Following the conclusion of the Paris 2024 Olympics, negotiations restarted for Great Britain to be brought back from hiatus for Los Angeles 2028. Contrary to earlier reports, the chief of the Football Association of Wales Noel Mooney dismissed the notion that talks had begun and stated that even if they had "our focus is very much here on Wales playing at tournaments."

== Criticism ==
The official football organisation officials and some players from Wales, Scotland, and Northern Ireland were against the move to create a Great Britain football team for the London 2012 Olympics. The FAW did not want their players involved in the GB squad for the London Olympics because they were concerned it could undermine their status as an independent footballing nation. Welsh fans also unfurled a "NO TEAM GB" banner following a 4–1 win over Norway for Wales at the Cardiff City Stadium. Aaron Ramsey said via Twitter "'Relax everyone, there is absolutely no way I would play in the Olympic team if it was going to affect Wales' identity as an individual nation!".

Welsh broadcaster Elis James said that he "profoundly disagreed at every level" with a GB team. It has been suggested that even an occasional British team "would severely weaken our status as an independent football nation (and Scotland and Northern Ireland’s status as well). Plenty in FIFA resent our position on IFAB, and would like to see us compete as Team GB. This has been brought up since the early 1970s".

Chief football writer for The Times suggested opposition to a GB team, "Anybody seriously suggesting a GB football team should just go and experience a Wales, Scotland, Northern Ireland or England game. Or just flick the TV on now and listen to Wales players and fans singing".

Whilst playing for a GB football team, Welsh players Ryan Giggs, Craig Bellamy, Joe Allen and Neil Taylor were criticised for not singing "God save the Queen". The manager of the team said that the Welsh players' decision not to sing the anthem is a personal decision.

== Colours ==
The official kit for the 2012 Olympics, designed by Stella McCartney and manufactured by Adidas, was unveiled alongside the uniform for all Team GB Olympic competitors in March. The front of the shirt is modelled on the right-hand side of a Union Flag, with the colours consisting of white and various shades of blue in keeping with the design of the uniforms in other sports. The back of the shirt is navy blue, as are the shorts and socks. The kit has a red trim. The change kit is pale blue and white, with varying shades displaying the same union flag design as the home kit. The crest is on the left breast of the shirt, and consists of a white shield with the generic Team GB logo in blue, with the words London 2012 below it.

== Players ==
=== Composition ===
The composition of the team has varied over time. All players in the 1908, 1912, 1920 and 1956 squads were English, while in other years players from Northern Ireland, Scotland and Wales were all included. The 2012 squad contained 13 English and 5 Welsh players but no Scottish or Northern Irish players. Jack Butland, the third choice goalkeeper for England, was the only player selected for both the Olympics and the England Euro 2012 squad. Ryan Giggs, Craig Bellamy and Micah Richards were selected as the three overage players. Former England captain David Beckham was shortlisted for the Olympics, but was left out of the final squad.

=== London 2012 squad ===
The Great Britain squad for the 2012 Olympic Games was announced on 2 July 2012, with Ryan Giggs named as captain.

- The three over age players are denoted with a *
- Clubs listed are those which held the player's registration during the Olympics
- Players' ages are those which the player were at the day of their first game at the Olympics

No.	Pos.	Player	Date of birth (age)	Caps	Goals	Club
1	GK	(England) Jack Butland	10 March 1993 (aged 19)	5	0	(England) Birmingham City
18	GK	(England) Jason Steele	18 August 1990 (aged 21)	1	0	(England) Middlesbrough
2	DF	(Wales) Neil Taylor	7 February 1989 (aged 23)	5	0	(Wales) Swansea City
3	DF	(England) Ryan Bertrand	5 August 1989 (aged 22)	4	0	(England) Chelsea
5	DF	(England) Steven Caulker	29 December 1991 (aged 20)	5	0	(England) Tottenham Hotspur
6	DF	(England) Craig Dawson	6 May 1990 (aged 22)	3	0	(England) West Bromwich Albion
12	DF	(England) James Tomkins	29 March 1989 (aged 23)	2	0	(England) West Ham United
14	DF	(England) Micah Richards*	24 June 1988 (aged 24)	5	0	(England) Manchester City
4	MF	(England) Danny Rose	2 July 1990 (aged 22)	4	0	(England) Tottenham Hotspur
7	MF	(England) Tom Cleverley	12 August 1989 (aged 22)	5	0	(England) Manchester United
8	MF	(Wales) Joe Allen	14 March 1990 (aged 22)	5	0	(Wales) Swansea City
11	MF	(Wales) Ryan Giggs* (captain)	29 November 1973 (aged 38)	4	1	(England) Manchester United
13	MF	(England) Jack Cork	25 June 1989 (aged 23)	4	0	(England) Southampton
15	MF	(Wales) Aaron Ramsey	26 December 1990 (aged 21)	5	1	(England) Arsenal
16	MF	(England) Scott Sinclair	25 March 1989 (aged 23)	4	1	(Wales) Swansea City
9	FW	(England) Daniel Sturridge	1 September 1989 (aged 22)	5	2	(England) Chelsea
10	FW	(Wales) Craig Bellamy*	13 July 1979 (aged 33)	5	1	(England) Liverpool
17	FW	(England) Marvin Sordell	17 February 1991 (aged 21)	3	0	(England) Bolton Wanderers

== Records and statistics ==
=== Summer Olympics record ===
Gold medalists
Silver medalists
Bronze medalists

Summer Olympics										Qualification							Manager
Year	Host	Round	Pld	W	D	L	F	A	Squad	Pos.	Pld	W	D	L	F	A	Manager
1900	France	Gold medal	1	1	0	0	5	0		Great Britain was represented by Upton Park F.C.							
1904	United States	Did not enter								Did not enter							—N/a
1908	United Kingdom	Gold medal	3	3	0	0	18	1	Squad	No qualification phase							(England) Davis
1912	Sweden	Gold medal	3	3	0	0	15	2	Squad	No qualification phase							(England) Birch
1920	Belgium	First round	1	0	0	1	1	3	Squad	No qualification phase							(Wales) Latham
1924	France	Did not enter								No qualification phase							—N/a
1928	Netherlands	Did not enter								No qualification phase							—N/a
1936	Germany	Second round	2	1	0	1	6	5	Squad	No qualification phase							(England) Voisey
1948	United Kingdom	Fourth place	4	2	0	2	9	11	Squad	No qualification phase							(Scotland) Busby
1952	Finland	Preliminary round	1	0	0	1	3	5	Squad	No qualification phase							(England) Winterbottom
1956	Australia	Second round	2	1	0	1	10	6	Squad	2nd	2	0	1	1	3	5	(England) Creek
1960	Italy	Group stage	3	1	1	1	8	8	Squad	3rd	4	3	1	0	13	6	(England) Creek
1964	Japan	Did not qualify								R1	4	3	0	1	13	5	—N/a
1968	Mexico	Did not qualify								FR	4	1	1	2	2	2	—N/a
1972	West Germany	Did not qualify								R1	2	1	0	1	1	5	—N/a
1976	Canada	Did not enter								Did not enter							—N/a
1980	Soviet Union	Did not enter								Did not enter							—N/a
1984	United States	Did not enter								Did not enter							—N/a
1988	South Korea	Did not enter								Did not enter							—N/a
1992	Spain	Did not enter								Did not enter							—N/a
1996	United States	Did not enter								Did not enter							—N/a
2000	Australia	Did not enter								Did not enter							—N/a
2004	Greece	Did not enter								Did not enter							—N/a
2008	China	Did not enter								Did not enter							—N/a
2012	United Kingdom	Quarter-finals	4	2	2	0	6	3	Squad	Qualified as hosts							(England) Pearce
2016	Brazil	Did not enter								Did not enter							—N/a
2020	Japan	Did not enter								Did not enter							—N/a
2024	France	Did not enter								Did not enter							—N/a
Total		Gold medal	23	13	3	7	76	44	—	3/6	16	8	3	5	32	23	

=== Olympic finals ===
==== 1908 final ====
24 October 1908
15:00

Great Britain	2–0	Denmark
Chapman 20'; Woodward 46'	Report

White City, London
Attendance: 8,000
Referee: John Lewis (Great Britain)

==== 1912 final ====
4 July 1912
19:00

Great Britain	4–2	Denmark
Hoare 22', 41'; Walden 10'; Berry 43'	Report	Olsen 27', 81'

Stockholms Stadion, Stockholm
Attendance: 25,000
Referee: Christiaan Groothoff (Netherlands)

== Results ==
This is a full round-up of Great Britain's performances at the Olympic Games.

20 October 1908 1908 Olympics – R1/QF	Great Britain	12–1	Sweden	London, UK
	Stapley 10'; Woodward (?); Berry (?); Chapman (?); Purnell (?); Hawkes (?)	Report	Bergström 65'	Stadium: White City Stadium; Attendance: 2,000; Referee: John Ibbotson (GB)

22 October 1908 1908 Olympics – SF	Great Britain	4–0	Netherlands	London, UK
	Stapley 37', 60', 64', 75'	Report		Stadium: White City Stadium; Attendance: 6,000; Referee: John Howcroft (GB)

24 October 1908 1908 Olympics – Final	Great Britain	2–0	Denmark	London, UK
	Chapman 20'; Woodward 65'	Report		Stadium: White City Stadium; Attendance: 6,000; Referee: John Lewis (GB)

30 June 1912 1912 Olympics – R2/QF	Hungary	0–7	Great Britain	Stockholm, Sweden
		Report	Walden 21', 23', 49', 55', 85'; Woodward 45', 53'	Stadium: Olympiastadion; Attendance: 8,000; Referee: Christiaan Groothoff (Sweden)

2 July 1912 1912 Olympics – SF	Finland (Russia)	0–4	Great Britain	Stockholm, Sweden
		Report	Holopainen 2' (o.g.); Walden 7', 77'; Woodward 82'	Stadium: Olympiastadion; Attendance: 4,000; Referee: Ruben Gelbord (Sweden)

4 July 1912 1912 Olympics – Final	Denmark	2–4	Great Britain	Stockholm, Sweden
	Olsen 27', 81'	Report	Walden 10'; Hoare 22', 41'; Berry 43'	Stadium: Olympiastadion; Attendance: 25,000; Referee: Christiaan Groothoff (Sweden)

28 August 1920 1920 Olympics – R1	Norway	3–1	Great Britain	Antwerp, Belgium
	Gundersen 13', 51'; Wilhelms 63'	Report	Nicholas 25'	Stadium: Olympisch Stadion; Attendance: 5,000; Referee: Johannes Mutters (Netherlands)

6 August 1936 1936 Olympics – R1	China	0–2	Great Britain	Berlin, Nazi Germany
		Report	Dodds 55'; Finch 65'	Stadium: Mommsenstadion; Attendance: 8,000; Referee: Helmut Fink (Nazi Germany)

8 August 1936 1936 Olympics – QF	Poland	5–4	Great Britain	Berlin, Nazi Germany
	Gad 33'; Wodarz 43', 48', 53'; Piec 56'	Report	Clements 26'; Shearer 71'; Joy 78', 80'	Stadium: Poststadion; Attendance: 6,000; Referee: Rudolf Eklöw (Sweden)

Note: As of 1948, many Eastern Bloc states, such as Yugoslavia and Bulgaria, played with their full national sides in the Olympics, while Britain always competed with an amateur team, as per Olympic requirements.

31 July 1948 1948 Olympics – R1	Great Britain	4–3 (a.e.t.)	Netherlands	London, UK
	McBain 22'; Hardisty 58'; Kelleher 77'; McIlvenny 111'	Report	Appel 9', 63'; Wilkes 81'	Stadium: Highbury Stadium; Attendance: 21,000; Referee: Valdemar Laursen (Denmark)

5 August 1948 1948 Olympics – QF	Great Britain	1–0	France	London, UK
	Hardisty 29'	Report		Stadium: Craven Cottage; Attendance: 25,000; Referee: Karel van der Meer (Netherlands)

11 August 1948 1948 Olympics – SF	Great Britain	1–3	Yugoslavia	London, UK
	Donovan 20'	Report	Bobek 19'; Wölfl 24'; Mitić 48'	Stadium: Wembley Stadium; Attendance: 40,000; Referee: Karel van der Meer (Netherlands)

13 August 1948 1948 Olympics – Bronze	Great Britain	3–5	Denmark	London, UK
	Aitken 5'; Hardisty 33'; Amor 63'	Report	Præst 12', 49'; Hansen 16', 77'; Sørensen 41'	Stadium: Wembley Stadium; Attendance: 5,000; Referee: Karel van der Meer (Netherlands)

16 July 1952 1952 Olympics – Prelim	Luxembourg	5–3 (a.e.t.)	Great Britain	Lahti, Finland
	Roller 60', 95', 97'; Letsch 91'; Gales 102'	Report	Robb 12'; Slater 101'; Lewis 118'	Stadium: Lahden kisapuisto Attendance: 3,740; Referee: Vincenzo Orlandini (Italy)

23 October 1955 1956 Olympics – Qualifying	Bulgaria	2–0	Great Britain	Sofia, Bulgaria
	Stefanov 30'; Yanev 61'	Report		Stadium: Vasil Levski National Stadium; Attendance: 45,000; Referee: Giorgio Bernardi (Italy)

12 May 1956 1956 Olympics – Qualifying	Great Britain	3–3 (3–5 agg.)	Bulgaria	London, UK
	Hardisty 12', 62'; Lewis 77' (pen.)	Report	Milanov 28'; Prince 32' (o.g.); Dimitrov 66'	Stadium: Wembley Stadium; Attendance: 30,000; Referee: Giorgio Bernardi (Italy)

Note: Britain lost 5–3 on aggregate, but earned a reprieve to compete in Melbourne

26 November 1956 1956 Olympics – R1	Thailand	0–9	Great Britain	Melbourne, Australia
		Report	Twissell 12', 20'; Lewis 21' (pen.); Laybourne 30', 82', 85'; Bromilow 75', 78'; Topp 90'	Stadium: Olympic Park Stadium; Attendance: 3,693; Referee: Nikolay Latyshev (USSR)

30 November 1956 1956 Olympics – QF	Bulgaria	6–1	Great Britain	Melbourne, Australia
	Dimitrov 6'; Kolev 40', 85'; Milanov 45', 75', 80'	Report	Lewis 30'	Stadium: Olympic Park Stadium; Attendance: 6,748; Referee: Ron Wright (Australia)

21 November 1959 1960 Olympics – Qualifying	Great Britain	3–2	Republic of Ireland	Hove, UK
	Devine 1'; Hasty 45', 80'	Report; Report	Aherne; Rice	Stadium: Goldstone Ground; Attendance: 7,800; Referee: Arthur Blavier (Belgium)

13 March 1960 1960 Olympics – Qualifying	Republic of Ireland	1–3	Great Britain	Dublin, Ireland
	McGrath (?)	Report; Report	Coates (?); Brown (?); Harding (?)	Stadium: Dalymount Park; Attendance: 19,000

2 April 1960 1960 Olympics – Qualifying	Netherlands	1–5	Great Britain	Zwolle, Netherlands
	Hainje 29'	Report	Lewis (?); Lindsay 25'; Brown 31'	Stadium: Oosterenkstadion or at ZAC; Attendance: 9,000

13 April 1960 1960 Olympics – Qualifying	Great Britain	2–2 _{(GB qualify)}	Netherlands	London, UK
	Brown (?); Lewis (?)	Report	De Kleermaeker (?); Bouwman (?)	Stadium: White Hart Lane; Attendance: 3,950

26 August 1960 1960 Olympics – Groups	Brazil	4–3	Great Britain	Livorno, Italy
	Gérson 2'; China 61', 72'; Wanderley 64'	Report; Report	Brown 32', 87'; Lewis 47'	Stadium: Stadio di Ardenza; Attendance: 13,590; Referee: Josef Kandlbinder (FR Germany)

29 August 1960 1960 Olympics – Groups	Italy	2–2	Great Britain	Rome, Italy
13:00	Rossano 11', 55'	Report	Brown 23'; Hasty 75'	Referee: Lucien van Nuffel (Belgium)

1 September 1960 1960 Olympics – Groups	Great Britain	3–2	Taiwan	Grosseto, Italy
12:00	Lewis 35'; Brown 58'; Hasty 85'	Report	Chuk Yin Yiu 70', 88'	Stadium: Stadio Olimpico Comunale; Referee: Josef Kandlbinder (FR Germany)

26 July 2012 2012 Olympics – Groups	Great Britain	1–1	Senegal	Manchester, UK
20:00	Bellamy 20'	Report	Konaté 82'	Stadium: Old Trafford; Attendance: 72,176; Referee: Irmatov (Uzbekistan)

29 July 2012 2012 Olympics – Groups	Great Britain	3–1	United Arab Emirates	London, UK
19:45	Giggs 16'; Sinclair 73'; Sturridge 76'	Report	Eisa 60'	Stadium: Wembley Stadium; Attendance: 85,137; Referee: García (Mexico)

1 August 2012 2012 Olympics – Groups	Great Britain	1–0	Uruguay	Cardiff, UK
19:45	Sturridge 45+1'	Report		Stadium: Millennium Stadium; Attendance: 70,438; Referee: Nishimura (Japan)

4 August 2012 2012 Olympics – Quarter-finals	Great Britain	1–1 (a.e.t.) (4–5 p)	South Korea	Cardiff, UK
19:30	Ramsey 36' (pen.)	Report	Ji Dong-won 29'	Stadium: Millennium Stadium; Attendance: 70,171; Referee: Roldán (Colombia)
	Penalties
	Ramsey (penalty scored); Cleverley (penalty scored); Dawson (penalty scored); Giggs (penalty scored); Sturridge (penalty missed)		(penalty scored) Koo Ja-cheol; (penalty scored) Baek Sung-dong; (penalty scored) Hwang Seok-ho; (penalty scored) Park Jong-woo; (penalty scored) Ki Sung-yueng

== See also ==
- Great Britain women's Olympic football team
- United Kingdom national football team
