= O Su-cheol =

South Korean basketball player (1917–1995)

Personal information
- Nationality: South Korean
- Born: 1917
- Died: 1995 (aged 77–78)

Sport
- Sport: Basketball

O Su-cheol (1917–1995) was a South Korean basketball player. He competed in the men's tournament at the 1948 Summer Olympics.
