= Dennis Kelleher =

Irish footballer

Personal information
- Date of birth: 20 November 1918
- Place of birth: Dungarvan, Ireland
- Date of death: 20 February 2002 (aged 83)
- Position: Striker

Senior career*
Years	Team	Apps	(Gls)
1936–1952	Barnet	358	(286)

International career
1938–1950	Ireland Amateur	8	(4)
1948	Great Britain	3	(1)
- * Club domestic league appearances and goals

Dennis Kelleher (20 November 1918 – 20 February 2002) was an Irish footballer who represented Great Britain at the 1948 Summer Olympics. Dennis played amateur football with Barnet, winning the FA Amateur Cup in 1946; he also earned 8 amateur caps for Ireland. Kelleher also represented touring team Middlesex Wanderers.

During World War II, Kelleher served as a lieutenant in the Royal Naval Volunteer Reserve, and was captured while serving in Egypt, later escaping from a German prisoner-of-war camp.
