= Kim Jeong-sin =

South Korean basketball player (1919–2001)

Personal information
- Nationality: South Korean
- Born: 1919 Pyongyang, Korea, Empire of Japan
- Died: 21 February 2001 (aged 81–82) Seoul, South Korea

Sport
- Sport: Basketball

Kim Jeong-sin (1919 – 21 February 2001) was a South Korean basketball player. He competed in the men's tournament at the 1948 Summer Olympics. Kim died in Seoul on 21 February 2001.
