= Emilio Caprile =

Italian footballer (1928–2020)

Personal information
- Full name: Emilio Caprile
- Date of birth: 30 September 1928
- Place of birth: Genoa, Italy
- Date of death: 5 March 2020 (aged 91)
- Place of death: Genoa
- Height: 1.72 m (5 ft 8 in)
- Position: Forward

Senior career*
Years	Team	Apps	(Gls)
1945–1946	Genoa	65	(?)
1946–1947	Sestrese	?	(18)
1947–1948	Legnano	34	(12)
1948–1949	Juventus	32	(9)
1949–1951	Atalanta	62	(16)
1951–1952	Juventus	5	(2)
1952–1953	Lazio	20	(2)
1953–1954	Como	21	(3)
1954–1958	Legnano	127	(34)

International career
1948–1950	Italy	2	(2)
1950	Italy B	1	(0)
- * Club domestic league appearances and goals

Emilio Caprile (Italian pronunciation: [eˈmiːljo kaˈpriːle]; 30 September 1928 – 5 March 2020) was an Italian footballer who played as a forward. A versatile player, he was capable of playing both as a striker and as a left winger.

== Club career ==
Born in Genoa, Emilio Caprile's Serie A debut came at 17 years of age with Genoa in 1945 then Sestrese in Serie B as well as Legnano before going to Juventus. With Juventus he won the championship having only played five games and scoring 2 goals. Tired of riding the bench he went to Atalanta for two seasons and then to Lazio, Como in Serie B, returning finally to Legnano in Serie C. He retired after 13 seasons.

== International career ==
Caprile made his senior international debut for Pozzo's Italy national team in the round of 16 of the 1948 London Olympics on 2 August 1948, also scoring a goal in a 9–0 win over the United States, in Brentford, at the age of 19 years, 10 months, and 2 days, making him one of Italy's youngest ever debutants. He also made another appearance in the tournament, playing in the quarterfinals, scoring a goal in Italy's 5–3 loss to Denmark. These were the only two appearances that Caprile made for Italy between 1948 and 1950. In total, he scored two goals for Italy. He was the youngest player on Italy's 1950 World Cup team, but one of four players who did not see any action throughout the tournament.

== International goals ==
No.	Date	Venue	Opponent	Score	Result	Competition
1.	2 August 1948	Brentford, Great Britain	United States	9–0	9–0	1948 Summer Olympics
2.	5 August 1948	Highbury, Great Britain	Denmark	2–2	3–5	1948 Summer Olympics
