= Marco Bandinelli =

Italian painter

Marco Bandinelli (fl. 17th c.), also known as Marchino di Guido Reni, was an Italian painter of the Baroque period. He began as a model and cook for Guido Reni in Bologna.
