= Francesco Cergoli =

Italian footballer and coach

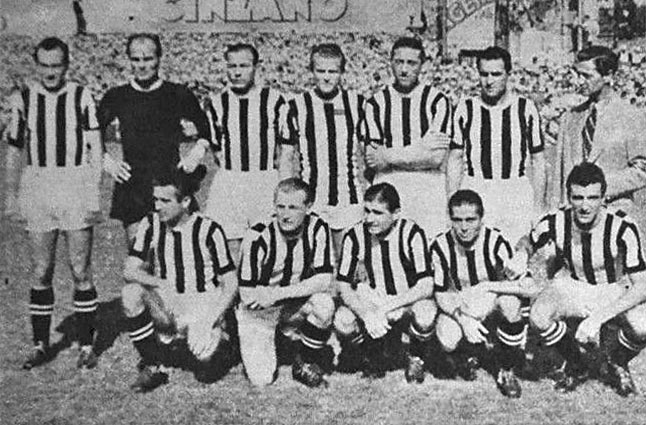
- Francesco Cergoli (back row, first from left) as part of Juventus in 1947

Personal information
- Date of birth: October 22, 1921
- Place of birth: Divača, Italy, now Slovenia
- Date of death: 2000 (aged 78-79)
- Positions: Striker; midfielder

Senior career*
Years	Team	Apps	(Gls)
1939–1940	Monfalcone	20	(12)
1940–1944	Triestina	75	(27)
1945–1946	Triestina	24	(6)
1946–1947	Atalanta	35	(8)
1947–1949	Juventus	55	(10)
1949–1954	Atalanta	131	(9)
1954–1956	Lecco	58	(8)
1956–1957	Molfetta	19	(6)
1957–1959	Monfalcone	32	(0)

Managerial career
- 1973–1974: Triestina
- * Club domestic league appearances and goals

Francesco Cergoli (October 22, 1921 – January 29, 2000) was an Italian professional football player and coach.
