= Johnny Jordan =

English footballer

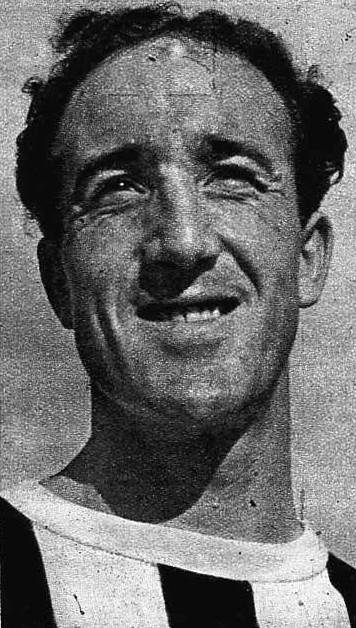
- Jordan in Juventus kit, 1949

Personal information
- Full name: William John Jordan
- Date of birth: 8 November 1921
- Place of birth: Bromley, England
- Date of death: 9 January 2016 (aged 94)
- Place of death: Cambridge, England
- Position: Inside forward

Senior career*
Years	Team	Apps	(Gls)
- Bromley
- Grays Athletic
1946–1947	West Ham United		
1947–1948	Tottenham Hotspur	24	(10)
1948–1949	Juventus	20	(5)
1949–1950	Birmingham City	24	(2)
1950–1951	Sheffield Wednesday	10	(2)
1951–1953	Tonbridge		
1953–195?	Bedford Town		
- * Club domestic league appearances and goals

John William Jordan (8 November 1921 – 9 January 2016) was an English professional footballer who played as an inside forward.

Born in Bromley, Kent, Jordan began his career with home-town club Bromley, before moving on to Grays Athletic, West Ham United (as an amateur), and then Tottenham Hotspur. He scored twice on his Tottenham debut in a 5–1 victory over Sheffield Wednesday at White Hart Lane in August 1947 in the Second Division. That season he scored 10 goals in 24 appearances.

He moved to Italy and Juventus in 1948, and subsequently appeared for Birmingham City, Sheffield Wednesday, Tonbridge and Bedford Town.

Jordan died on 9 January 2016 in Cambridge at the age of 94.
