= Andy Aitken (footballer, born 1919) =

Scottish footballer

Personal information
- Full name: Andrew Irving Aitken
- Date of birth: 15 October 1919
- Place of birth: Cathcart, Scotland
- Date of death: 8 June 2000 (aged 80)
- Place of death: Glasgow, Scotland
- Position: Inside right

Senior career*
| Years | Team | Apps | (Gls) |
| –1939 | Shawfield | | |
| 1939–1944 | Queen's Park | | |
| 1944–1945 | Third Lanark | | |
| 1945–1946 | Hamilton Academical | | |
| 1946–1949 | Queen's Park | 56 | (26) |

International career
| 1948 | Great Britain | 1 | (1) |
- * Club domestic league appearances and goals

Andrew Irving Aitken (15 October 1919 – 8 June 2000) was a Scottish amateur footballer who made over 170 appearances in the Scottish League for Queen's Park as an inside right. He represented Great Britain at the 1948 Summer Olympics.

== Personal life ==
Prior to and during the Second World War, Aitken worked for David Colville & Sons in Motherwell.
