= Araldo Caprili =

Italian footballer (1920-1982)

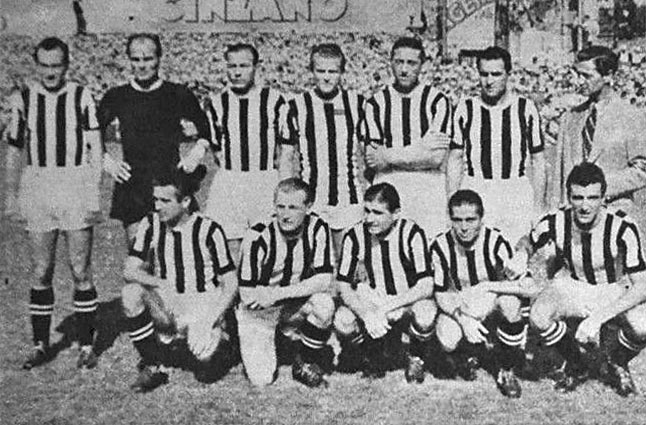
- Araldo Caprili (front row, second from right) playing for Juventus Football Club in 1947

Personal information
- Date of birth: 10 September 1920
- Place of birth: Viareggio, Italy
- Date of death: 9 January 1982 (aged 61)
- Position: Defender

Senior career*
Years	Team	Apps	(Gls)
1939–1940	Pontedera		
1946–1947	Viareggio	41	(2)
1947–1949	Juventus	22	(1)
1949–1952	Lucchese	72	(0)
1952–1953	Spezia	22	(0)
1953–1954	Arsenalspezia	22	(0)
- * Club domestic league appearances and goals

Araldo Caprili (10 September 1920 – 9 January 1982) was an Italian professional football player.
