= Appie Corman =

Dutch boxer

Personal information
- Nationality: Dutch
- Born: 30 November 1925; Groningen, Netherlands
- Died: 24 April 2006 (aged 80); Groningen, Netherlands

Sport
- Sport: Boxing

Appie Corman (30 November 1925 – 24 April 2006) was a Dutch boxer. He competed in the men's flyweight event at the 1948 Summer Olympics.
