= Han Soo-ann =

South Korean boxer (1926–1998)

- Hangul: 한수안
- Hanja: 韓水安
- RR: Han Suan
- MR: Han Suan

Han Soo-ann
Medal record

Men's boxing

Representing South Korea

Olympic Games
Bronze medal – third place	1948 London	Flyweight

Han Soo-ann (18 June 1926 – 4 January 1998) was a South Korean boxer.

== Biography ==
Han graduated from Sungkyunkwan University and served the military as an officer, making one of the first korean boxing teams in the navy. Han competed for South Korea at the 1948 Summer Olympics held in London, United Kingdom in the flyweight event where he finished in third place. Han also competed for at the 1952 Summer Olympics held in Helsinki, Finland in the flyweight event where he was a quarterfinalist.

== 1948 Olympic results ==
Below is the record of Han Soo-An, a South Korean flyweight boxer who competed at the 1948 London Olympics:

- Round of 32: defeated Robert Gausterer (Austria) on points
- Round of 16: defeated Maxim Cochin (France) on points
- Quarterfinal: defeated Appie Corman (Netherlands) by a second-round knockout
- Semifinal: lost to Spartaco Bandinelli (Italy) on points
- Bronze-Medal Bout: defeated Fratisek Majdloch (Czechoslovakia) on points (was awarded bronze medal)
