= Ron Gower =

Australian boxer (1929–2018)

Ronald Charles Gower
Personal information
- Nationality: Australian
- Born: March 6, 1929; Hobart, Tasmania, Australia
- Died: February 8, 2018 (aged 88); Hobart, Tasmania, Australia

Sport
- Sport: Boxing

Ronald Charles Gower, OAM (6 March 1929 – 8 February 2018) was an Australian boxer. He competed at the 1948 Summer Olympics and the 1952 Summer Olympics.

Ron grew up in Gormanston, a mining town on the west coast of Tasmania, before moving to Hobart in late childhood. He was the son of Charles 'Scotty' Gower, an amateur boxer.

Gower was seventeen when, in 1946, he became the Tasmanian Flyweight Championship. The following year, Ron won the Australian Flyweight Title, successfully defending it in 1949. In 1951, he won the Australian Bantamweight Title.

Gower placed 9th as a Flyweight in the 1948 Summer Olympics, and 15th as a Bantamweight in the 1952 Summer Olympics. He was named Australia's number one boxer on both occasions.

Gower also competed in the 1950 British Empire Games in Auckland, New Zealand.

Gower was Tasmania's first dual Olympian, retiring in 1955. He is a member of the Tasmanian Sporting Hall of Fame, inducted in 1992.

On the Australia Day Honours list in 1993 Ron was awarded the Medal of the Order of Australia. This was in recognition of service to youth through the promotion of sport.

Later in life, Ron became a publican, managing establishments around Hobart. He then built the Foreshore Tavern, at Lauderdale.

Ron Gower died in Hobart, Tasmania on 8 February 2018, at the age of 88.
