= Francesco Grosso =

Italian footballer

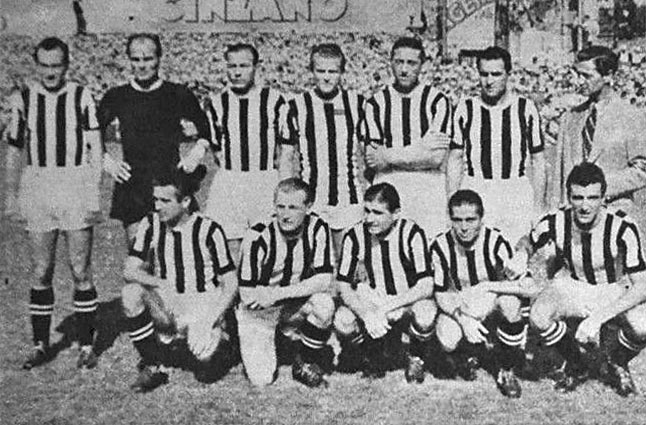
- Francesco Grosso (front row, first from left) as part of Juventus in 1947

Personal information
- Date of birth: 15 November 1921
- Place of birth: Turin, Kingdom of Italy
- Date of death: 2 October 2006 (aged 84)
- Place of death: Turin, Italy
- Position: Midfielder

Senior career*
Years	Team	Apps	(Gls)
1940–1941	Juventus	1	(0)
1941–1944	Casale	63	(4)
1945–1946	Como	23	(0)
1946–1949	Juventus	18	(2)
1949–1950	Empoli	38	(10)
1950–1952	Juve Stabia		
- * Club domestic league appearances and goals

Francesco Grosso (15 November 1921 – 2 October 2006) was an Italian professional football player.
