= Harry McIlvenny =

English footballer

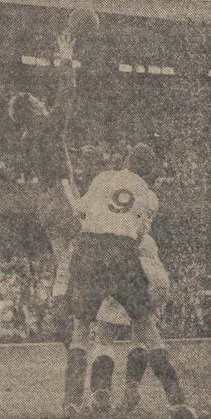
- McIlvenny with number 9 at the 1948 Summer Olympics

Personal information
- Date of birth: 5 October 1922
- Place of birth: Bradford, England
- Date of death: 29 June 2009 (aged 86)
- Position: Centre forward

Senior career*
Years	Team	Apps	(Gls)
19xx–1946	Yorkshire Amateur		
1946–1950	Bradford Park Avenue	43	(17)
1950–1953	Bishop Auckland		

International career
1948	Great Britain	4	(1)
- * Club domestic league appearances and goals

Harry J. McIlvenny (5 October 1922 – 29 June 2009) was an English footballer who played as a centre forward.

== Career ==
Born in Bradford, McIlvenny played club football for Yorkshire Amateur, Bradford Park Avenue and Bishop Auckland.

He represented Great Britain at the 1948 Summer Olympics.

== Personal life ==
McIlvenny served in the RAF in World War Two and died in 2009, aged 86.
