= František Majdloch =

Czech boxer (1929–2001)

Personal information
- Born: 14 October 1929 Hranice, Czechoslovakia
- Died: 30 November 2001 (aged 72)

Sport
- Sport: Boxing

František Majdloch (14 October 1929 – 30 November 2001) was a Czech boxer. He competed for Czechoslovakia at the 1948, 1952 and the 1956 Summer Olympics. He died on 30 November 2001, at the age of 72.
