= Spartaco Bandinelli =

Italian boxer (1921–1997)

Medal record

Men's Boxing

Representing Italy

Olympic Games
Silver medal – second place	1948 London	Flyweight

Spartaco Bandinelli (27 March 1921 – 17 February 1997) was an Italian boxer. He was born and died in Velletri.

He started boxing at the amateur level at the age of 16. World War II would interrupt his boxing career, he was drafted into the Italian army. At the end of the war he joined AS Audace, a Roman sports club. On the occasion of the national championships in Vigevano he was noticed by the coach of the Italian national boxing team, Steve Klaus.

He competed for Italy in the 1948 Summer Olympics held in London, United Kingdom in the flyweight event where he finished in second place, losing to Pascual Pérez of Argentina.

== 1948 Olympic results ==
Below are the results of Spartaco Bandinelli who competed for Italy as a flyweight boxer at the 1948 London Olympics:

- Round of 32: defeated Olli Lehtinen (Finland) on points
- Round of 16: defeated Leslie Handunge (Ceylon) on points
- Quarterfinal: defeated Luis Martinez (Spain) on points
- Semifinal: defeated Han Soo-An (South Korea) on points
- Final: lost to Pascual Perez (Argentina) on points (was awarded silver medal)
