= Frank Donovan (footballer) =

Welsh footballer

Personal information
- Full name: Francis James Donovan
- Date of birth: 26 February 1919
- Place of birth: Pembroke, Wales
- Date of death: 17 April 2003 (aged 84)
- Place of death: Pembroke, Wales
- Position: Winger

Senior career*
Years	Team	Apps	(Gls)
- Milford United
- Haverfordwest
- Pembroke Borough
1950–1951	Swansea Town	15	(2)
- Pembroke Borough

International career
1948	Great Britain	2	(1)

Managerial career
- Pembroke Borough
- Milford United
- * Club domestic league appearances and goals

Francis James Donovan (26 February 1919 – 17 April 2003) was a Welsh footballer who represented Great Britain at the 1948 Summer Olympics. Donovan played amateur football with Milford United, Haverfordwest and Pembroke Borough, where he captained them to promotion in 1947–48 and was selected for the 1948 Great Britain Olympic squad.

He joined the English Football League for Swansea Town, signing for the club in July 1950.

He rejoined Pembroke Borough in July 1951 helping them win the Welsh Football League double in the 1953–54 season.

He subsequently managed Pembroke Borough and Milford United.

He combined his football career with a job as an electrician at Pembroke Dock, and he also owned a sports shop.
