= Football at the 1948 Summer Olympics – Men's team squads =

The following squads were named for the 1948 Summer Olympics tournament.

== Afghanistan ==
Head coach:

Pos.	Player	DoB	Age	Caps	Club	Tournament games	Tournament goals	Minutes played	Sub off	Sub on	Cards yellow/red
GK	Abdul Ghafoor Assar			?	(Afghanistan) Mahmoudiyeh F.C.	1	0	90	-	-	-
DF	Mohamed Ibrahim Gharzai			?		1	0	90	-	-	-
DF	Mohammad Sarwar Yousafzai			?		1	0	90	-	-	-
MF	Abdul Shacour Azimi	1923		?		1	0	90	-	-	-
MF	Yar Mohammed Barakzai	1923		?		1	0	90	-	-	-
MF	Abdul Ahad Kharot	1926		?	(Afghanistan) Mahmoudiyeh F.C.	1	0	90	-	-	-
FW	Mohammad Anwar Afzal	1926		?		1	0	90	-	-	-
FW	Abdul Ghani Assar	1923		?	(Afghanistan) Mahmoudiyeh F.C.	1	0	90	-	-	-
FW	Mohamed Anwar Kharot			?		1	0	90	-	-	-
FW	Abdul Hamid Tajik	1923		?		1	0	90	-	-	-
FW	Abdul Gharfoor Yusufzai			?		1	0	90	-	-	-
	Stand-by players -
FW	Abdul Wahid Aitimadi			?	(Afghanistan) Mahmoudiyeh F.C.	0	0	0	-	-	-
FW	M.M.Azami			?		0	0	0	-	-	-
FW	A.S.Mohamedzai			?		0	0	0	-	-	-
FW	M.U.Sadat			?		0	0	0	-	-	-
FW	M.I.Tokhi			?		0	0	0	-	-	-

== Austria ==
Head coach: Eduard Frühwirth

Pos.	Player	DoB	Age	Caps	Club	Tournament games	Tournament goals	Minutes played	Sub off	Sub on	Cards yellow/red
FW	Josef Epp	Mar 1, 1920	28	?	(Austria) Wiener Sportclub	1	0	90	-	-	-
FW	Erich Habitzl	Oct 9, 1923	24	?	(Austria) SK Admira Wien	1	0	90	-	-	-
FW	Wilhelm Hahnemann	Apr 14, 1914	34	?	(Austria) SC Wacker Wien	1	0	90	-	-	-
DF	Ernst Happel	Nov 29, 1925	22	?	(Austria) SK Rapid Wien	1	0	90	-	-	-
MF	Siegfried Joksch	Jul 4, 1917	31	?	FK Austria Wien	1	0	90	-	-	-
FW	Alfred Körner	Feb 14, 1926	22	?	(Austria) SK Rapid Wien	1	0	90	-	-	-
DF	Karl Kowanz	Apr 15, 1926	22	?	(Austria) SK Admira Wien	1	0	65	-	-	/1red
FW	Ernst Melchior	Jun 26, 1920	28	?	FK Austria Wien	1	0	90	-	-	-
MF	Leopold Mikolasch	Oct 17, 1920	27	?	FK Austria Wien	1	0	90	-	-	-
DF	Ernst Ocwirk	Mar 7, 1926	22	?	FK Austria Wien	1	0	90	-	-	1 yel. / -
GK	Franz Pelikan	Nov 6, 1925	22	?	(Austria) SC Wacker Wien	1	0	90	-	-	-
	Stand-by players -
MF	Theodor Brinek	May 9, 1921	27	?	(Austria) SC Wacker Wien	0	0	0	-	-	-
MF	Karl Decker	Sep 5, 1921	26	?	(Austria) First Vienna FC	0	0	0	-	-	-
FW	Ludwig Durek	Jan 27, 1921	27	?	(Austria) SK Sturm Graz	0	0	0	-	-	-
GK	Bruno Engelmeier	Sep 5, 1927	20	?	(Austria) First Vienna FC	0	0	0	-	-	-
DF	Gustav Gerhart	Feb 4, 1922	26	?	(Austria) SK Admira Wien	0	0	0	-	-	-
MF	Leopold Gernhardt	Mar 16, 1920	28	?	(Austria) SK Rapid Wien	0	0	0	-	-	-
GK	Josef Musil	Aug 7, 1920	27	?	(Austria) SK Rapid Wien	0	0	0	-	-	-
FW	Ernst Stojaspal	Jan 14, 1925	23	?	FK Austria Wien	0	0	0	-	-	-
FW	Josef Stroh	Mar 5, 1913	35	?	FK Austria Wien	0	0	0	-	-	-
FW	Theodor Wagner	Aug 6, 1927	20	?	(Austria) SC Wacker Wien	0	0	0	-	-	-

== China ==
Head coach: Lee Wei Tong

Pos.	Player	DoB	Age	Caps	Club	Tournament games	Tournament goals	Minutes played	Sub off	Sub on	Cards yellow/red
FW	Chang King Hai			?	(Hong Kong) Sing Tao SC	1	0	90	-	-	-
GK	Zhang Banglun	Jul 15, 1919	29	?	(Taiwan) Shangai Tung Hwa	1	0	90	-	-	-
MF	Zou Wenzhi			?	(Hong Kong) Sing Tao SC	1	0	90	-	-	-
FW	Chia Boon Leong	1925		?	(Singapore)	1	0	90	-	-	-
FW	Zhu Yongqiang			?	(Hong Kong) Sing Tao SC	1	0	90	-	-	-
DF	Hau Yung Sang			?	(Hong Kong) Sing Tao SC	1	0	90	-	-	-
FW	Ho Ying Fun			?	(Hong Kong) Sing Tao SC	1	0	90	-	-	-
MF	Liu Songsheng			?	(Hong Kong) Sing Tao SC	1	0	90	-	-	-
FW	Li Dahui			?		1	0	90	-	-	-
DF	Xin Yanshi			?		1	0	90	-	-	-
MF	Song Lingsheng			?	(Hong Kong) Sing Tao SC	1	0	90	-	-	-
	Stand-by players -
GK	Chu Chi Shing			?	(Singapore)	0	0	0	-	-	-
FW	Fung King Cheong (馮景祥)	Dec 19, 1907	40	?	(Hong Kong) Sing Tao SC	0	0	0	-	-	-
MF	Kao Pao Chang			?		0	0	0	-	-	-
MF	Kwok Ying Kee			?		0	0	0	-	-	-
FW	Lai Shiu Wing	1917		?	(Hong Kong) Sing Tao SC	0	0	0	-	-	-
DF	Tze Kam Hung			?		0	0	0	-	-	-
FW	Yeap Cheng Eng	1916		?	(Malayan Union)	0	0	0	-	-	-

== Denmark ==
Head coach: (England) Reg Mountford

Pos.	Player	DoB	Age	Caps	Club	Tournament games	Tournament goals	Minutes played	Sub off	Sub on	Cards yellow/red
FW	John Hansen	Jun 24, 1924	24	?	(Denmark) BK Frem	4	7	390	-	-	-
FW	Karl Aage Hansen	Jul 4, 1921	27	?	(Denmark) AB	3	2	300	-	-	-
MF	Ivan Jensen	Nov 10, 1922	25	?	(Denmark) AB	4	0	390	-	-	-
MF	Viggo Jensen	Mar 29, 1921	27	?	(Denmark) Esbjerg fB	4	0	390	-	-	-
FW	Knud Lundberg	May 14, 1920	28	?	(Denmark) AB	2	0	210	-	-	-
GK	Eigil Nielsen	Sep 15, 1918	29	?	(Denmark) KB	4	0	390	-	-	-
MF	Knud Børge Overgaard	Mar 21, 1918	30	?	(Denmark) B 93	4	0	390	-	-	-
MF	Axel Pilmark	Nov 23, 1925	22	?	(Denmark) KB	4	0	390	-	-	-
FW	Johannes Pløger	Apr 3, 1922	26	?	(Denmark) BK Frem	4	2	390	-	-	-
FW	Carl Aage Præst	Feb 26, 1922	26	?	(Denmark) ØB	4	2	390	-	-	-
FW	Holger Seebach	Mar 17, 1922	25	?	(Denmark) AB	2	1	180	-	-	-
FW	Jørgen Leschly Sørensen	Sep 24, 1922	25	?	(Denmark) Odense Boldklub	1	1	90	-	-	-
MF	Dion Ørnvold	Oct 17, 1921	26	?	(Denmark) KB	4	0	390	-	-	-
	Stand-by players -
DF	Knud Bastrup-Birk	Dec 12, 1919	28	?	(Denmark) AB	0	0	0	-	-	-
DF	Hans Colberg	Dec 14, 1921	26	?	(Denmark) BK Frem	0	0	0	-	-	-
DF	Edvin Hansen	Jan 21, 1920	28	?	(Denmark) Køge BK	0	0	0	-	-	-
FW	Jørgen Wagner Hansen	Sep 15, 1925	22	?	(Denmark) KB	0	0	0	-	-	-
FW	Erik Kuld Jensen	Jun 10, 1925	23	?	(Denmark) AGF	0	0	0	-	-	-
GK	Ove Jensen	Nov 7, 1919	28	?	(Denmark) B 93	0	0	0	-	-	-
DF	Per Knudsen	Jun 2, 1925	27	?	(Denmark) AGF	0	0	0	-	-	-
DF	Poul Petersen	Apr 11, 1921	27	?	(Denmark) AB	0	0	0	-	-	-
FW	Erling Sørensen	Oct 29, 1920	27	?	(Denmark) BK Frem	0	0	0	-	-	-

== Egypt ==
Head coach: (England) Eric Keen

Pos.	Player	DoB	Age	Caps	Club	Tournament games	Tournament goals	Minutes played	Sub off	Sub on	Cards yellow/red
MF	Mohamed Abou Habaga			?	(Egypt) Zamalek	1	0	120	-	-	-
MF	Hanafy Bastan	Dec 6, 1923	24	?	(Egypt) Zamalek	1	0	120	-	-	-
FW	El-Sayed El-Dhizui	Sep 14, 1926	21	?	(Egypt) Al-Masry	1	0	120	-	-	-
FW	Mohamed El-Guindi			?	(Egypt) Al Ahly	1	1	120	-	-	-
FW	Ahmed Mekkawi			?	(Egypt) Al Ahly	1	0	120	-	-	-
GK	Yehia Emam	Mar 15, 1919	29	?	(Egypt) Zamalek	1	0	120	-	-	-
DF	Abdel Aziz El-Hammami			?	(Egypt) Al Ahly	1	0	120	-	-	-
MF	Helmi Abou El-Maati			?	(Egypt) Al Ahly	1	0	120	-	-	-
FW	Hussein Madkour			?	(Egypt) Al Ahly	1	0	120	-	-	-
FW	Abdel-Karim Sakr	Nov 8, 1918	29	?	(Egypt) Zamalek	1	0	120	-	-	-
DF	Fouad Sedki	Oct 24, 1925	22	?	(Egypt) Al Ahly	1	0	120	-	-	-
	Stand-by players -
FW	Mohamed Diab El-Attar "Diba"	Nov 11, 1927	20	?	(Egypt) Union Alexandria	0	0	0	-	-	-
FW	Kamal El-Sabbagh			?	(Egypt) Union Alexandria	0	0	0	-	-	-
FW	Mohamed Ali El-Zamek			?	(Egypt) Al-Masry	0	0	0	-	-	-
FW	Mahmoud Hafez			?	(Egypt) Zamalek	0	0	0	-	-	-
DF	Mahmoud Hamdi			?	(Egypt) Al Ahly	0	0	0	-	-	-
GK	Kamal Hamed			?	(Egypt) Al Ahly	0	0	0	-	-	-
MF	Galal Keraitem			?	(Egypt) Zamalek	0	0	0	-	-	-
FW	Mohamed Ahmed Mekhimar			?	(Egypt) Al-Sekka Al-Hadid	0	0	0	-	-	-
FW	Ali Sayed Osman			?	(Egypt) Al Ahly	0	0	0	-	-	-
FW	Mohamed Sheta			?	(Egypt) Union Alexandria	0	0	0	-	-	-
FW	Yosri Ahmed Soliman			?	(Egypt) Al Ahly	0	0	0	-	-	-

== France ==
Head coach:

Pos.	Player	DoB	Age	Caps	Club	Tournament games	Tournament goals	Minutes played	Sub off	Sub on	Cards yellow/red
DF	Bernard Bienvenu	Nov 30, 1920	27	0	(France) Stade Français-Red Star	2	0	180	-	-	-
MF	Marius Colau	January 31, 1922	26	0	(France) Stade Rennais	2	0	180	-	-	-
FW	Raoul René Courbin	August 18, 1926	22	0	(France) Chamois Niortais	2	1	180	-	-	-
FW	René Hebinger	Jun 22, 1921	27	0	(France) FC Mulhouse	1	0	90	-	-	-
FW	Joseph Heckel	Jul 7, 1922	26	0	(France) RC Strasbourg	2	0	180	-	-	-
MF	Raymond Krug	Oct 19, 1924	23	0	(France) RC Strasbourg	2	0	180	-	-	-
FW	Jean Palluch	Dec 23, 1923	24	0	(France) Stade de Reims	2	0	180	-	-	-
MF	René Persillon	Jun 16, 1919	29	0	(France) FC Girondins de Bordeaux	2	1	180	-	-	-
MF	Gabriel Robert	Mar 5, 1920	28	0	(France) Hyères FC	2	0	180	-	-	-
MF	Charles Rouelle			?	Racing Club de France	1	0	90	-	-	-
GK	Guy Rouxel	Jan 24, 1926	22	?	(France) Stade Rennais	2	0	180	-	-	-
FW	André Strappe	Feb 23, 1928	20	?	(France) ES Bully	2	0	180	-	-	-
	Stand-by players -
GK	Robert Bottini	Sep 24, 1916	31	0	(France) US Meknès	0	0	0	-	-
MF	Gustave Ducousso	Feb 13, 1918	30	0	(France) Olympique de Beja	0	0	0	-	-	-
DF	Lazare Gianessi	Nov 9, 1925	22	0	(France) Olympique Saint-Quentin	0	0	0	-	-	-
MF	Hacène Hamoutène	Sep 26, 1913	35	0	(Algeria) MC Alger	0	0	0	-	-	-
FW	Jean Lanfranchi	Mar 20, 1923	25	0	(France) Cazères	0	0	0	-	-	-
FW	Marcel Lanfranchi	Jan 11, 1921	27	0	(France) Cazères	0	0	0	-	-	-
MF	François Mercurio	Jan 19, 1930	18	0	(Algeria) Olympique Littoral	0	0	0	-	-	-
MF	Guy Rabstejnek	Aug 7, 1924	23	0	(France) Stade Rennais	0	0	0	-	-	-
GK	Lucien Schaeffer	Jun 6, 1928	20	0	(France) RC Strasbourg	0	0	0	-	-	-

== Great Britain ==
Head coach: Matt Busby

Pos.	Player	DoB	Age	Caps	Club	Tournament games	Tournament goals	Minutes played	Sub off	Sub on	Cards yellow/red
FW	Andy Aitken	Oct 15, 1919	28	?	(Scotland) Queen's Park	1	1	90	-	-	-
FW	Bill Amor	Nov 6, 1919	28	?	(England) Reading	1	1	90	-	-	-
FW	John Boyd	Sep 10, 1926	21	?	(Scotland) Queen's Park	1	0	90	-	-	-
DF	Angus Carmichael	Jun 12, 1925	23	?	(Scotland) Queen's Park	1	0	90	-	-	-
FW	Frank Donovan	Feb 21, 1919	29	?	(Wales) Pembroke Borough	2	1	180	-	-	-
MF	Eric Fright	Sep 10, 1917	30	?	(England) Bromley	4	0	390	-	-	-
FW	Bob Hardisty	Dec 1, 1921	26	?	(England) Darlington	4	3	390	-	-	-
FW	Thomas Hopper	April 10, 1915	33	?	(England) Bromley	1	ml
FW	Dennis Kelleher	Nov 20, 1918	29	?	(Ireland) Barnet	3	1	300	-	-	-
FW	Peter Kippax	Jul 17, 1922	26	?	(England) Burnley	3	0	300	-	-	-
MF	Eric Lee	Oct 18, 1922	25	?	(England) Chester City	4	0	390	-	-	-
DF	Gwyn Manning	Aug 19, 1915	32	?	(Wales) Troedyrhiw	1	0	120	-	-	-
GK	Kevin McAlinden	Nov 17, 1913	34	?	(Ireland) Belfast Celtic	2	0	180	-	-	-
MF	Douglas McBain	Sep 22, 1924	23	?	(Scotland) Queen of the South	3	1	300	-	-	-
DF	James McColl	Nov 13, 1924	23	?	(Scotland) Queen's Park	2	0	180	-	-	-
FW	Harold McIlvenny	Oct 5, 1922	25	?	(England) Bradford Park Avenue	4	1	390	-	-	-
DF	Charles Neale	Feb 11, 1917	31	?	(England) Walton & Hersham	4	0	390	-	-	-
FW	Jack Rawlings	Jun 18, 1923	25	?	(England) Enfield	1	0	90	-	-	-
GK	Ronnie Simpson	Oct 11, 1930	17	?	(Scotland) Queen's Park	2	0	210	-	-	-
	Stand-by players-
FW	David Letham	May 7, 1922		?	(Scotland) Queen's Park	0	0	0	-	-	-
MF	Ronald Phipps			?	(England) Barnet	0	0	0	-	-	-
MF	Doug Smith			?	(Wales) Barry AFC	0	0	0	-	-	-

== India ==
Head coach: Balaidas Chatterjee

Pos.	Player	DoB	Age	Caps	Club	Tournament games	Tournament goals	Minutes played	Sub off	Sub on	Cards yellow/red
MF	Talimeren Ao	Jan 28, 1918	30	?	(India) Mohun Bagan	1	0	90	-	-	-
MF	Sattar Basheer	1924		?	(India) Mysore	1	0	90	-	-	-
FW	Rabi Das			?	(India) Bhawanipore	1	0	90	-	-	-
FW	Ahmed Khan	Dec 24, 1926	21	?	(India) Mysore	1	0	90	-	-	-
DF	Sailen Manna	Sep 1, 1924	23	?	(India) Mohun Bagan	1	0	90	-	-	-
FW	Sahu Mewalal	Jul 1, 1926	22	?	(India) Eastern Railway S.C.	1	0	90	-	-	-
DF	Taj Mohammad Sr.	1924		?	(India) East Bengal	1	0	90	-	-	-
MF	Mahabir Prasad	1918		?	(India) East Bengal	1	0	90	-	-	-
FW	Ramchandra Parab	1925		?	(India) Bombay	1	0	90	-	-	-
FW	Sarangapani Raman	1920		?	(India) Mysore	1	1	90	-	-	-
GK	K. V. Varadaraj	1923		?	(India) Mysore	1	0	90	-	-	-
	Stand-by players -
FW	K. P. Dhanraj			?	(India) Mysore	0	0	0	-	-	-
MF	S. M. Kaiser			?	(India) East Bengal	0	0	0	-	-	-
MF	Anil Nandy			?	(India) Eastern Railway	0	0	0	-	-	-
FW	Santosh Nandy	1932		?	(India) Eastern Railway	0	0	0	-	-	-
DF	Thenmadom Varghese			?	(India) Bombay	0	0	0	-	-	-
GK	Sanjeeva Uchil			?	(India) ICL-Bengal Club	0	0	0	-	-	-
MF	Balasundra Vajravelu			?	(India) Mysore	0	0	0	-	-	-

== Ireland (Éire) ==
Head coach: Johnny Carey

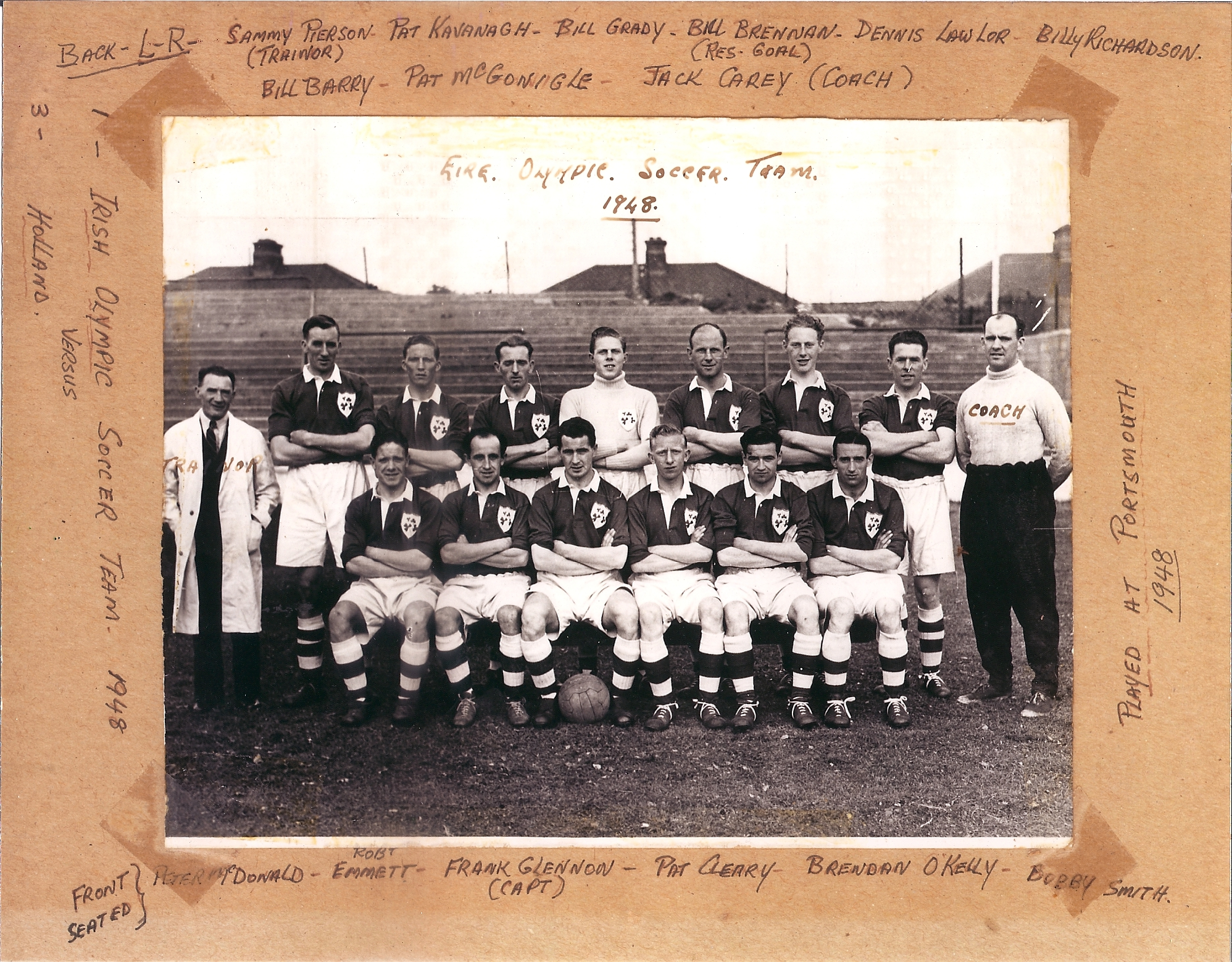

Pos.	Player	DoB	Age	Caps	Club	Tournament games	Tournament goals	Minutes played	Sub off	Sub on	Cards yellow/red
MF	William Barry			?	(Republic of Ireland) Waterford F.C.	1	0	90	-	-	-
FW	Desmond Cleary			?	(Republic of Ireland) Jacobs F.C.	1	0	90	-	-	-
DF	Frank Glennon			?	(Republic of Ireland) Shamrock Rovers F.C.	1	0	90	-	-	-
MF	Patrick Kavanagh			?	(Republic of Ireland) Bohemian F.C.	1	0	90	-	-	-
GK	Donald Lawler			?	(Republic of Ireland) Bohemian F.C.	1	0	90	-	-	-
FW	Peter McDonald			?	(Republic of Ireland) Transport F.C.	1	0	90	-	-	-
FW	Emmet McLoughlin			?	(Republic of Ireland) Bohemian F.C.	1	0	90	-	-	-
MF	William O'Grady			?	(Republic of Ireland) Limerick F.C.	1	0	90	-	-	-
FW	Brendan O'Kelly			?	(Republic of Ireland) Bohemian F.C.	1	1	90	-	-	-
DF	William Richardson			?	(Republic of Ireland) Bohemian F.C.	1	0	90	-	-	-
FW	Robert Smith			?	(Republic of Ireland) Bohemian F.C.	1	0	90	-	-	-
	Stand-by players -
MF	Harry Boland			?	(Republic of Ireland) Transport F.C.	0	0	0	-	-	-
GK	William Brennan			?	(Republic of Ireland) Transport F.C.	0	0	0	-	-	-
MF	Robert Brown			?	(Republic of Ireland) Shamrock Rovers	0	0	0	-	-	-
MF	Michael Collins			?	(Republic of Ireland) St.Patrick	0	0	0	-	-	-
MF	Micheal Farrell			?	(Republic of Ireland) Cork United	0	0	0	-	-	-
FW	Patrick McGonagle			?	(Republic of Ireland) Bohemian F.C.	0	0	0	-	-	-
MF	John Moris			?	(Republic of Ireland) Bohemian F.C.	0	0	0	-	-	-

== Italy ==
Head coach: Vittorio Pozzo

Pos.	Player	DoB	Age	Caps	Club	Tournament games	Tournament goals	Minutes played	Sub off	Sub on	Cards yellow/red
FW	Emilio Caprile	Sep 30, 1928	19	?	(Italy) A.C. Legnano	2	3	180	-	-	-
GK	Giuseppe Casari	Apr 10, 1922	26	?	(Italy) Atalanta B.C.	2	0	180	-	-	-
MF	Valerio Cassani	Feb 20, 1922	26	?	(Italy) Modena F.C.	2	0	180	-	-	-
FW	Emidio Cavigioli	Jul 3, 1925	23	?	(Italy) Pro Patria	2	2	180	-	-	-
DF	Guglielmo Giovannini	Dec 17, 1925	22	?	(Italy) Bologna F.C. 1909	2	0	180	-	-	1 yel. / -
MF	Tommaso Maestrelli	Oct 7, 1922	25	?	(Italy) A.S. Bari	1	0	90	-	-	-
MF	Giacomo Mari	Oct 17, 1924	23	?	(Italy) Atalanta B.C.	2	0	180	-	-	-
MF	Maino Neri	Jun 30, 1924	24	?	(Italy) Modena F.C.	2	0	180	-	-	-
FW	Francesco Pernigo	Jun 10, 1918	30	?	(Italy) Modena F.C.	2	5	180	-	-	-
MF	Cesare Presca	Feb 24, 1921	27	?	(Italy) U.S. Triestina Calcio	1	0	90	-	-	-
DF	Adone Stellin	Mar 3, 1921	27	?	(Italy) Genoa C.F.C.	2	1	180	-	-	-
MF	Angelo Turconi	Jul 5, 1923	25	?	(Italy) Pro Patria	2	1	180	-	-	-
	Stand-by players -
DF	Francesco Antonazzi	May 6, 1924	24	?	(Italy) S.S. Lazio	0	0	0	-	-	-
DF	Romolo Bizzotto	Feb 15, 1925	23	?	(Italy) Hellas Verona A.C.	0	0	0	-	-	-
FW	Renzo Burini	Oct 10, 1927	20	?	(Italy) A.C. Milan	0	0	0	-	-	-
MF	Enzo Menegotti	Jul 13, 1925	23	?	(Italy) Modena F.C.	0	0	0	-	-	-
FW	Egisto Pandolfini	Feb 19, 1926	22	?	(Italy) SPAL 1907	0	0	0	-	-	-
GK	Glauco Vanz	Aug 10, 1920	27	?	(Italy) Bologna F.C.	0	0	0	-	-	-

== South Korea ==
Head coach: Lee Young-min

Pos.	Player	DoB	Age	Caps	Club	Tournament games	Tournament goals	Minutes played	Sub off	Sub on	Cards yellow/red
FW	Bae Jeong-ho			?	(South Korea) Incheon	2	1	180	-	-	-
MF	Choi Seong-gon			?	(South Korea) Chosun Electrical Industry	2	1	180	-	-	-
FW	Chung Kook-chin	Jan 2, 1917	31	?	(South Korea) Incheon	2	2	180	-	-	-
MF	Chung Nam-sik	Feb 16, 1917	31	?	(South Korea) Chosun Electrical Industry	2	1	180	-	-	-
GK	Hong Deok-young	May 5, 1921	27	?	(South Korea) Korea University	2	0	180	-	-	-
MF	Kim Kyu-hwan	Jul 16, 1921	27	?	(South Korea) Chosun Electrical Industry	2	0	180	-	-	-
MF	Min Byung-dae	Feb 20, 1918	30	?	(South Korea) Chosun Electrical Industry	2	0	180	-	-	-
DF	Park Dae-jong	Jan 21, 1917	31	?	(South Korea) Chosun Electrical Industry	2	0	180	-	-	-
DF	Park Kyu-chung	Jun 12, 1924	24	?	(South Korea) Chosun Electrical Industry	2	0	180	-	-	-
FW	U Jeong-hwan	Jul 16, 1921	27	?	(South Korea) Chosun Electrical Industry	2	0	180	-	-	-
FW	Kim Yong-sik	Jul 25, 1910	38	?	(South Korea) Chosun Electrical Industry	2	0	180	-	-	-
	Stand-by players -
FW	An Jong-soo	Dec 7, 1920	27	?	(South Korea) Chosun Electrical Industry	0	0	0	-	-	-
GK	Cha Soon-chong	1916		?	(South Korea) Chosun Electrical Industry	0	0	0	-	-	-
DF	Lee See-dong			?	(South Korea) Incheon	0	0	0	-	-	-
MF	Lee Yoo-hyung	Jan 21, 1911	37	?	(South Korea) Incheon	0	0	0	-	-	-
FW	Oh Kyung-whan			?	(South Korea) Incheon	0	0	0	-	-	-

== Luxembourg ==
Head coach: Jean-Pierre Hoscheid

Pos.	Player	DoB	Age	Caps	Club	Tournament games	Tournament goals	Minutes played	Sub off	Sub on	Cards yellow/red
DF	Jean Feller	Oct 16, 1919	28	?	(Luxembourg) Chiers Rodange	2	0	180	-	-	-
FW	Victor Feller	Feb 22, 1923	25	?	(Luxembourg) Stade Dudelange	2	0	180	-	-	-
FW	Jules Gales	Jul 13, 1924	24	?	Spora Luxembourg	2	2	180	-	-	-
FW	Nicolas Kettel	Dec 17, 1925	22	?	(Luxembourg) Stade Dudelange	2	1	180	-	-	-
FW	Lucien Konter	Aug 12, 1925	22	?	(Luxembourg) Chiers Rodange	1	0	90	-	-	-
FW	Jim Kremer	Jan 18, 1918	30	?	(Luxembourg) National Schifflange	1	0	90	-	-	-
MF	Nicolas May	Sep 30, 1927	20	?	(Luxembourg) Red Boys Differdange	2	0	180	-	-	-
GK	Bernard Michaux	Sep 7, 1921	26	?	(Luxembourg) Stade Dudelange	2	0	180	-	-	-
FW	Marcel Paulus	Jul 20, 1920	28	?	(Luxembourg) CS Grevenmacher	2	2	180	-	-	-
DF	Nicolas Pauly	Nov 19, 1919	28	?	(Luxembourg) F91 Dudelange	2	0	180	-	-	-
FW	Fernand Schammel	Mar 30, 1923	25	?	Union Luxembourg	2	2	180	-	-	-
MF	Raymond Wagner	Nov 10, 1921	26	?	(Luxembourg) Stade Dudelange	2	0	180	-	-	-
	Stand-by players -
MF	Jean Becker	Jun 15, 1922	26	?	(Luxembourg) Stade Dudelange	0	0	0	-	-	-
MF	Nicolas Birtz	Mar 17, 1922	26	?	(Luxembourg) Stade Dudelange	0	0	0	-	-	-
MF	Fernand Guth	Maj 3, 1926	22	?	Union Luxembourg	0	0	0	-	-	-
GK	François Magnani	Jun 7, 1928	20	?	(Luxembourg) National Schifflange	0	0	0	-	-	-
FW	Emile Nurenberg	Dec 12, 1918	29	?	(Luxembourg) Progrès Niedercorn	0	0	0	-	-	-
FW	Marcel Rewenig	Jan 16, 1922	26	?	Spora Luxembourg	0	0	0	-	-	-
MF	Léon Schumacher	Jul 5, 1918	30	?	(Luxembourg) National Schifflange	0	0	0	-	-	-
GK	Paul Steffen	Jan 17, 1930	18	?	(Luxembourg) Jeunesse Esch	0	0	0	-	-	-
DF	Camille Wagner	Apr 13, 1925	23	?	(Luxembourg) CS Fola Esch	0	0	0	-	-	-
FW	Marcel Welter	Jan 7, 1924	24	?	(Luxembourg) CS Pétange	0	0	0	-	-	-

== Mexico ==
Head coach: Abel Ramírez

Pos.	Player	DoB	Age	Caps	Club	Tournament games	Tournament goals	Minutes played	Sub off	Sub on	Cards yellow/red
DF	Raúl Cárdenas	Oct 30, 1928	19	?	(Mexico) Real Club España	1	1	90	-	-	-
MF	Alberto Cordoba	May 13, 1925	23	?	(Mexico) Estrella	1	0	90	-	-	-
MF	Fernando Figueroa	Jul 2, 1925	23	?	(Mexico) SUTAJ	1	1	90	-	-	-
FW	Eduardo Garduño	Oct 2, 1928	19	?	(Mexico) Club América	1	0	90	-	-	-
FW	José Mercado Luna	Aug 6, 1928	19	?	(Mexico) Occidente	1	0	90	-	-	-
GK	Francisco Quintero Nava	Mar 8, 1923	25	?	(Mexico) Imperio	1	0	90	-	-	-
DF	Jorge Rodríguez Navarro			?	(Mexico) Club Atlas	1	0	90	-	-	-
DF	José Luis Rodríguez Peralta	Nov 5, 1922	25	?	(Mexico) CF Moctezuma	1	0	90	-	-	-
FW	Jorge Ruiz Aguilar	May 13, 1928	20	?	(Mexico) Atlas Tulancingo	1	1	90	-	-	-
FW	Mario Sánchez			?	(Mexico) Club América	1	0	90	-	-	-
DF	Carlos Thompson			?	(Mexico) Instituto Politécnico Nacional	1	0	90	-	-	-
	Stand-by players -
GK	Antonio Carbajal	Jun 7, 1929	19	?	(Mexico) Oviedo	0	0	0	-	-	-
FW	José Maria Cobián			?	(Mexico) Club América	0	0	0	-	-	-
MF	Julio Parrales Tapia	1922	25	?	(Mexico) Instituto Politécnico Nacional	0	0	0	-	-	-
MF	Ruben Ruiz Aguilar			?	(Mexico) Atlas Tulancingo	0	0	0	-	-	-
MF	Julio Trujillo			?	(Mexico) Instituto Politécnico Nacional	0	0	0	-	-	-
MF	Fidel Villalobos			?	(Mexico) Imperio	0	0	0	-	-	-

== Netherlands ==
Head coach: (England) Jesse Carver

Pos.	Player	DoB	Age	Caps	Club	Tournament games	Tournament goals	Minutes played	Sub off	Sub on	Cards yellow/red
FW	Bram Appel	Oct 30, 1921	26	0	(Netherlands) VV Sittard	1	2	120	-	-	-
DF	Jeu van Bun	Dec 10, 1918	29	6	(Netherlands) MVV	2	0	210	-	-	-
GK	Piet Kraak	Aug 20, 1928	19	12	(Netherlands) Stormvogels	2	0	210	-	-	-
MF	Kees Krijgh Sr.	Aug 28, 1921	26	0	(Netherlands) BVV	2	0	210	-	-	-
FW	Abe Lenstra	Nov 27, 1920	27	7	(Netherlands) SC Heerenveen	2	0	210	-	-	-
FW	Kees Rijvers	May 27, 1926	22	11	(Netherlands) NAC Breda	2	0	210	-	-	-
FW	André Roosenburg	Aug 18, 1923	24	2	(Netherlands) Neptunia	1	1	90	-	-	-
DF	Henk Schijvenaar	May 31, 1918	30	6	(Netherlands) EDO	2	0	210	-	-	-
DF	Rinus Terlouw	Jun 16, 1922	26	3	(Netherlands) DCV	2	0	210	-	-	-
FW	Kees van der Tuijn	Jul 24, 1924	24	2	(Netherlands) Hermes DVS	2	0	210	-	-	-
MF	Arie de Vroet	Nov 9, 1918	29	14	(Netherlands) Feijenoord	2	0	210	-	-	-
FW	Faas Wilkes	Oct 13, 1923	24	12	(Netherlands) Xerxes	2	3	210	-	-	-
	Stand-by players -
MF	Louis Biesbrouck	Feb 20, 1921	27	0	(Netherlands) RCH	0	0	0	-	-	-
FW	Mick Clavan	Mar 11, 1929	19	1	(Netherlands) ADO	0	0	0	-	-	-
FW	Guus Dräger	Dec 14, 1917	30	13	(Netherlands) Ajax	0	0	0	-	-	-
DF	Jan Everse Sr	May 8, 1922	26	0	(Netherlands) Neptunus	0	0	0	-	-	-
GK	Wim Landman	Apr 13, 1921	27	0	(Netherlands) Neptunus	0	0	0	-	-	-
MF	Rinus Schaap	Feb 22, 1922	26	1	(Netherlands) 't Gooi	0	0	0	-	-	-
MF	Joop Stoffelen	Jan 23, 1921	27	5	(Netherlands) Ajax	0	0	0	-	-	-

Wim Landman, Sjaak Alberts, Jos Beenhakkers and Henk Temming were also part of the Dutch squad, but they did not play in any matches.

== Sweden ==
Head coach: (England) George Raynor

Pos.	Player	DoB	Age	Caps	Club	Tournament games	Tournament goals	Minutes played	Sub off	Sub on	Cards yellow/red
MF	Sune Andersson	Feb 22, 1921	27	?	(Sweden) AIK	4	0	360	-	-	-
FW	Henry Carlsson	Oct 29, 1917	30	?	(Sweden) AIK	4	5	360	-	-	-
FW	Gunnar Gren	Oct 31, 1920	27	?	(Sweden) IFK Göteborg	4	3	360	-	-	-
DF	Börje Leander	Mar 7, 1918	30	?	(Sweden) AIK	2	0	180	-	-	-
FW	Nils Liedholm	Oct 8, 1922	25	?	(Sweden) IFK Norrköping	4	2	360	-	-	-
GK	Torsten Lindberg	Apr 14, 1917	31	?	(Sweden) IFK Norrköping	4	0	360	-	-	-
DF	Erik Nilsson	Aug 6, 1916	31	?	(Sweden) Malmö FF	4	0	360	-	-	-
MF	Bertil Nordahl	Jul 26, 1917	31	?	(Sweden) Degerfors IF	4	0	360	-	-	-
FW	Gunnar Nordahl	Oct 19, 1921	26	?	(Sweden) IFK Norrköping	4	7	360	-	-	-
DF	Knut Nordahl	Jan 13, 1920	28	?	(Sweden) IFK Norrköping	2	0	180	-	-	-
MF	Kjell Rosén	Apr 24, 1921	27	?	(Sweden) Malmö FF	4	5	360	-	-	-
MF	Birger Rosengren	Oct 29, 1917	30	?	(Sweden) IFK Norrköping	4	0	360	-	-	1 yel./
	Stand-by players -
FW	Pär Bengtsson	Jul 21, 1921	27	?	(Sweden) IF Elfsborg	0	0	0	-	-	-
DF	Rune Emanuelsson	Oct 8, 1923	24	?	(Sweden) IFK Göteborg	0	0	0	-	-	-
FW	Egon Jönsson	Oct 8, 1921	26	?	(Sweden) Malmö FF	0	0	0	-	-	-
FW	Stellan Nilsson	May 22, 1922	26	?	(Sweden) Malmö FF	0	0	0	-	-	-
FW	Stig Nyström	Nov 25, 1919	28	?	(Sweden) Djurgårdens IF	0	0	0	-	-	-
GK	Kalle Svensson	Nov 11, 1925	22	?	(Sweden) Helsingborgs IF	0	0	0	-	-	-

== Turkey ==
Head coach: Ulvi Yenal

Pos.	Player	DoB	Age	Caps	Club	Tournament games	Tournament goals	Minutes played	Sub off	Sub on	Cards yellow/red
DF	Murat Alyüz	1920	28	?	(Turkey) Fenerbahçe S.K.	2	0	180	-	-	-
GK	Cihat Arman	Jul 16, 1915	33	?	(Turkey) Fenerbahçe S.K.	2	0	180	-	-	-
MF	Bülent Eken	Oct 26, 1923	28	?	(Turkey) Galatasaray S.K.	2	0	170	-	-	/ 1 red
FW	Şükrü Gülesin	Sep 14, 1922	25	?	(Turkey) Beşiktaş J.K.	2	1	175	-	-	/1 red
FW	Erol Keskin	Mar 2, 1927	21	?	(Turkey) Fenerbahçe S.K.	2	0	180	-	-	-
FW	Gündüz Kılıç	Oct 29, 1918	29	?	(Turkey) Galatasaray S.K.	2	2	180	-	-	-
FW	Fikret Kırcan	Dec 25, 1919	28	?	(Turkey) Fenerbahçe S.K.	2	0	180	-	-	-
FW	Lefter Küçükandonyadis	Dec 29, 1925	22	?	(Turkey) Fenerbahçe S.K.	2	1	180	-	-	-
MF	Naci Özkaya	Jan 1, 1922	26	?	(Turkey) Galatasaray S.K.	1	0	90	-	-	-
FW	Hüseyin Saygun	1920	28	?	(Turkey) Vefa S.K.	2	1	180	-	-	-
MF	Selahattin Torkal	1925	23	?	(Turkey) Fenerbahçe S.K.	1	0	90	-	-	-
DF	Vedii Tosuncuk	1921	27	?	(Turkey) Beşiktaş J.K.	2	0	180	-	-	-
	Stand-by players -
FW	Hikmet Alpaslan	Jan 1, 1922	26	?	(Turkey) Beşiktaş J.K.	0	0	0	-	-	-
FW	Erdoğan Atlıoğlu	1929	19	?	(Turkey) Galatasaray S.K.	0	0	0	-	-	-
FW	Halit Deringör	Jul 17, 1922	26	?	(Turkey) Fenerbahçe S.K.	0	0	0	-	-	-
FW	Reha Eken	Jan 1, 1925	23	?	(Turkey) Galatasaray S.K.	0	0	0	-	-	-
DF	Ahmet Erol	Jan 1, 1921	27	?	(Turkey) Fenerbahçe S.K.	0	0	0	-	-	-
MF	Galip Haktanır	Jan 1, 1921	27	?	(Turkey) Vefa S.K.	0	0	0	-	-	-
FW	Muzaffer Tokaç	Jul 22, 1922	25	?	(Turkey) Galatasaray S.K.	0	0	0	-	-	-
MF	Samim Var	1925		?	(Turkey) Fenerbahce S.K.	0	0	0		-	-	-
FW	Yavuz Üreten	1920		?	(Turkey) Besiktas J.K	0	0	0	-	-	-

== United States ==
Head coach: Walter Giesler

Pos.	Player	DoB	Age	Caps	Club	Tournament games	Tournament goals	Minutes played	Sub off	Sub on	Cards yellow/red
MF	Walter Bahr	Apr 1, 1927	21	0	(United States) Philadelphia Nationals	1	0	90	-	-	-
FW	Raymond Beckman	Jun 30, 1925	23	0	(United States) De Andreis	1	0	90	-	-	-
FW	Bill Bertani	Sep 8, 1919	18	0	(United States) St. Louis Raiders	1	0	90	-	-	-
MF	Charles Colombo	Jul 20, 1920	28	?	(United States) St. Louis Simpkins-Ford	1	0	90	-	-	-
MF	Joseph Rego-Costa	Jul 3, 1919	29	2	(United States) Ponta Delgada S.C.	1	0	90	-	-	-
MF	Joe Ferreira	Dec 15, 1916	31	1	(United States) Ponta Delgada S.C.	1	0	90	-	-	-
DF	Manuel Martin	Dec 29, 1917	30	4	(United States) Ponta Delgada S.C.	1	0	90	-	-	-
FW	Benny McLaughlin	Apr 10, 1928	20	0	(United States) Philadelphia Nationals	1	0	90	-	-	-
FW	Ed Souza	Sep 22, 1921	26	?	(United States) Ponta Delgada S.C.	1	0	90	-	-	-
FW	John Souza	Jul 12, 1920	28	?	(United States) Ponta Delgada S.C.	1	0	90	-	-	-
GK	Archie Strimel	Jun 30, 1918	30	0	(United States) Pittsburgh Curry Vets	1	0	90	-	-	-
	Stand-by players -
DF	Robert Annis	Sep 5, 1928	19	0	(United States) St. Louis Simpkins-Ford	0	0	0	-	-	-
FW	Steve Grivnow	Feb 25, 1922	26	0	(United States) Pittsburgh Curry Vets	0	0	0	-	-	-
FW	Gino Pariani	Feb 21, 1928	20	0	(United States) St. Louis Simpkins-Ford	0	0	0	-	-	-
FW	Rolf Valtin	Jan 4, 1925	23	0	(United States) Swarthmore College	0	0	0	-	-	-

== Yugoslavia ==
Head coach: Milorad Arsenijević

Pos.	Player	DoB	Age	Caps	Club	Tournament games	Tournament goals	Minutes played	Sub off	Sub on	Cards yellow/red
MF	Aleksandar Atanacković	Apr 29, 1920	28	8	(Socialist Federal Republic of Yugoslavia) Partizan	4	0	360	-	-	-
FW	Stjepan Bobek	Dec 3, 1923	24	12	(Socialist Federal Republic of Yugoslavia) Partizan	4	4	360	-	-	-
DF	Miroslav Brozović	Aug 26, 1917	30	12	(Socialist Federal Republic of Yugoslavia) Partizan	4	0	360	-	-	1 yel.\ -
FW	Željko Čajkovski	May 5, 1925	23	4	(Socialist Federal Republic of Yugoslavia) Dinamo Zagreb	4	3	360	-	-	-
MF	Zlatko Čajkovski	Nov 24, 1923	24	11	(Socialist Federal Republic of Yugoslavia) Partizan	4	0	360	-	-	1 yel.\ -
FW	Zvonimir Cimermančić	Aug 26, 1917	30	8	(Socialist Federal Republic of Yugoslavia) Dinamo Zagreb	1	0	90	-	-	-
MF	Miodrag Jovanović	Jan 17, 1922	26	4	(Socialist Federal Republic of Yugoslavia) Partizan	4	0	360	-	-	-
GK	Ljubomir Lovrić	May 28, 1920	28	4	(Socialist Federal Republic of Yugoslavia) Red Star Belgrade	1	0	90	-	-	-
MF	Prvoslav Mihajlović	Apr 13, 1921	27	7	(Socialist Federal Republic of Yugoslavia) Partizan	2	1	180	-	-	-
FW	Rajko Mitić	Nov 19, 1922	25	7	(Socialist Federal Republic of Yugoslavia) Red Star Belgrade	4	2	360	-	-	-
GK	Franjo Šoštarić	Aug 1, 1919	28	6	(Socialist Federal Republic of Yugoslavia) Partizan	3	0	270	-	-	-
MF	Branko Stanković	Oct 31, 1921	30	8	(Socialist Federal Republic of Yugoslavia) Red Star Belgrade	4	1	360	-	-	-
FW	Kosta Tomašević	Jul 25, 1923	25	2	(Socialist Federal Republic of Yugoslavia) Red Star Belgrade	1	0	90	-	-	-
FW	Bernard Vukas	May 1, 1927	21	1	(Socialist Federal Republic of Yugoslavia) Hajduk Split	1	0	90	-	-	-
FW	Franjo Wölfl	May 18, 1918	30	8	(Socialist Federal Republic of Yugoslavia) Dinamo Zagreb	3	2	270	-	-	-
	Stand-by players -
DF	Božo Broketa	Dec 24, 1922	25	3	(Socialist Federal Republic of Yugoslavia) Hajduk Split	0	0	0	-	-	-
DF	Ivan Jazbinšek	Aug 9, 1914	33	7	(Socialist Federal Republic of Yugoslavia) Dinamo Zagreb	0	0	0	-	-	-
FW	Ratko Kacijan	Jan 18, 1917	31	1	(Socialist Federal Republic of Yugoslavia) Dinamo Zagreb	0	0	0	-	-	-
FW	Frane Matošić	Nov 25, 1918	29	15	(Socialist Federal Republic of Yugoslavia) Hajduk Split	0	0	0	-	-	-
MF	Béla Pálfi	Feb 16, 1923	25	1	(Socialist Federal Republic of Yugoslavia) Spartak Subotica	0	0	0	-	-	-
FW	Aleksandar Petrović	Sep 8, 1914	25	9	(Socialist Federal Republic of Yugoslavia) Red Star Belgrade	0	0	0	-	-	-
FW	Josip Takač	Sep 14, 1919	28	0	(Socialist Federal Republic of Yugoslavia) Spartak Subotica	0	0	0	-	-	-
