= Fung King Cheong =

Chinese footballer (born 1907)

Personal information
- Birth name: Feng Jingxiang
- Date of birth: 19 December 1907
- Place of birth: Guangzhou, Guangdong, China
- Height: 1.70 m (5 ft 7 in)

Senior career*
| Years | Team | Apps | (Gls) |
| 1925–1940 | South China | | |
| 1940–1945 | Sing Tao | | |
| 1945–1946 | Eastern Athletic Association | | |
| 1946–1948 | Sing Tao | | |
| 1948–1949 | South China | | |

International career
| 1934–1948 | China | | |
| 1927–1949 | Hong Kong | | |
- * Club domestic league appearances and goals

Fung King Cheong
- Traditional Chinese: 馮景祥
- Simplified Chinese: 冯景祥
Transcriptions
Standard Mandarin
- Hanyu Pinyin: Féng Jǐngxiáng
- Wade–Giles: Feng Ching Hsiang
- Yale Romanization: Feng Jing Syang
Yue: Cantonese
- Yale Romanization: Fung4 Ging2 Cheung4
- Jyutping: Fung4 Ging2 Coeng4

Fung King Cheong (born 19 December 1907, date of death unknown) was a Chinese professional footballer who went to the 1936 and 1948 Olympics. Fung spent his career in Guangzhou, China and Hong Kong. After the Chinese civil war, Fung remained in Hong Kong and never returned to mainland China to play or coach.

== Club career ==
Born in the Guangdong city of Guangzhou but with Enping ancestral roots on 19 December 1907, Fung was 13 when he began playing football in North China. After settling in Hong Kong, he joined the ranks of South China in the 1925–26 season as an inside-left. A member of the Guangzhou Police in mainland China since 1930, Fung continued to play for the SCAA on the weekends, playing a small role in their hegemony over Hong Kong's football in the 1930s. The team was split into A and B teams in the 1930s, and Fung belonged to South China "A" (Chinese: 南華南; lit. 'South China "South').

In 1940, Fung joined the newly founded team of Sing Tao, where he stayed for five years, until 1945, when the team collapsed following the end of the Second Sino-Japanese War, so he then joined the Eastern Athletic Association, but he returned to Sing Tao as soon as the team was re-established in 1946. In the 1948–49 season, Sing Tao once again fielded no team, so he returned to South China, where he retired in 1949, aged 42.

== International career ==
=== China ===
Fung was a member of the Chinese national team that participated in the 1936 and 1948 Summer Olympics, becoming the only Chinese footballer to achieve that. On the latter occasion, however, Fung did not play a single minute due to his advanced age of 41, given that no substitutions were allowed at the time. Fung also played in the 1934 Far Eastern Championship Games, as well as a friendly tournament against Portugal in April 1935.

=== Hong Kong (unofficial) ===
Before 1949, China only occasionally participated in international competitions, such as the aforementioned Olympic and Far Eastern Games, so the main fixtures were the Interports: annual matches between city select XI's, with Fung representing the Hong Kong XI, given that he was born there, making his known debut for them in a Hong Kong–Shanghai Interport match on 5 February 1927, aged 20, scoring once in an eventual 3–3 draw. During that same month, he also scored a brace for Southern China in a 4–1 win over Eastern China, scored a consolation goal for "Combined Chinese" in a 9–1 loss to "Combined Services", and scored again for "Combined Chinese" in a 2–2 draw with Hong Kong.

In January 1933, Fung represented "Hong Kong Chinese" (Chinese: 華聯), an unofficial feeder team of China, in a charity match for the Tung Wah Group of Hospitals against "Great Britain (Hong Kong) military representative team", scoring a brace to seal a 2–0 win. Fung also scored for the team against the Navy in a competition in 1936 (Chinese: 麗華杯), in which "Hong Kong Chinese" was the winner. He went on to play in the Hong Kong–Shanghai Interport in 1935 and 1937, with the latter Hong Kong team being composed of ethnic Chinese, including Fung and Lee Wai Tong, as well as Western expatriates, while Shanghai was composed of Western expatriates only.

On 28 March 1948, Fung scored for Hong Kong in a 2–1 victory over South Vietnam, becoming, at the age of 40 years and 100 days, the oldest international goalscorer in world football at the time, a record that has since been broken by England's Stanley Matthews in 1956, aged 41, although he held the Asian record for over 60 years, until it was finally broken by Singapore's Aleksandar Đurić in 2012, aged 42. In 1949, along with his "China" and South China teammate Chang King Hai and Hau Yung Sang, he was selected by Hong Kong against Saigon in the 1949 Hong Kong–Vietnam Interport. However, as Hong Kong only became a member of FIFA after 1954, while Saigon was never a member, this match was not official either.

== Personal life ==
Fung's sons were footballers, namely Fung Kee Wan (Chinese: 馮紀魂; Jyutping: Fung4 Gei2 Wan4), 馮紀良, 馮紀光, 馮紀棠.

Kee Wan represented Hong Kong in the 1960 Pestabola Merdeka and 1964 AFC Asian Cup.

紀良 was married to a daughter of fellow footballer and coach Hsu King Shing.
