= Hou Rongsheng =

Hou Rongsheng is the pinyin transliteration of (Chinese: 侯榕生). It may refer to:

- Hau Yung Sang, Republic of China and Republic of China (Taiwan) international footballer, but born in Hong Kong
- Hou Zong-Sheng (1926–1990) writer in Chinese language, born in the mainland China with Taiwan and United States citizenship
