= Jean Becker =

Jean Becker may refer to:

- Jean Becker (violinist) (1833–1884), German violinist
- Jean Becker (director) (born 1933), French film director, screenwriter and actor
- Jean Becker (footballer) (1922–2009), Luxembourgish footballer
