= Patrick Kavanagh (footballer, born 1919) =

Irish footballer

Patrick Kavanagh (22 June 1919 – 1 March 1993) was an Irish footballer of the 1940s, who played for the 1948 Irish Olympic team when they were knocked out of the 1948 Olympics by the Netherlands.

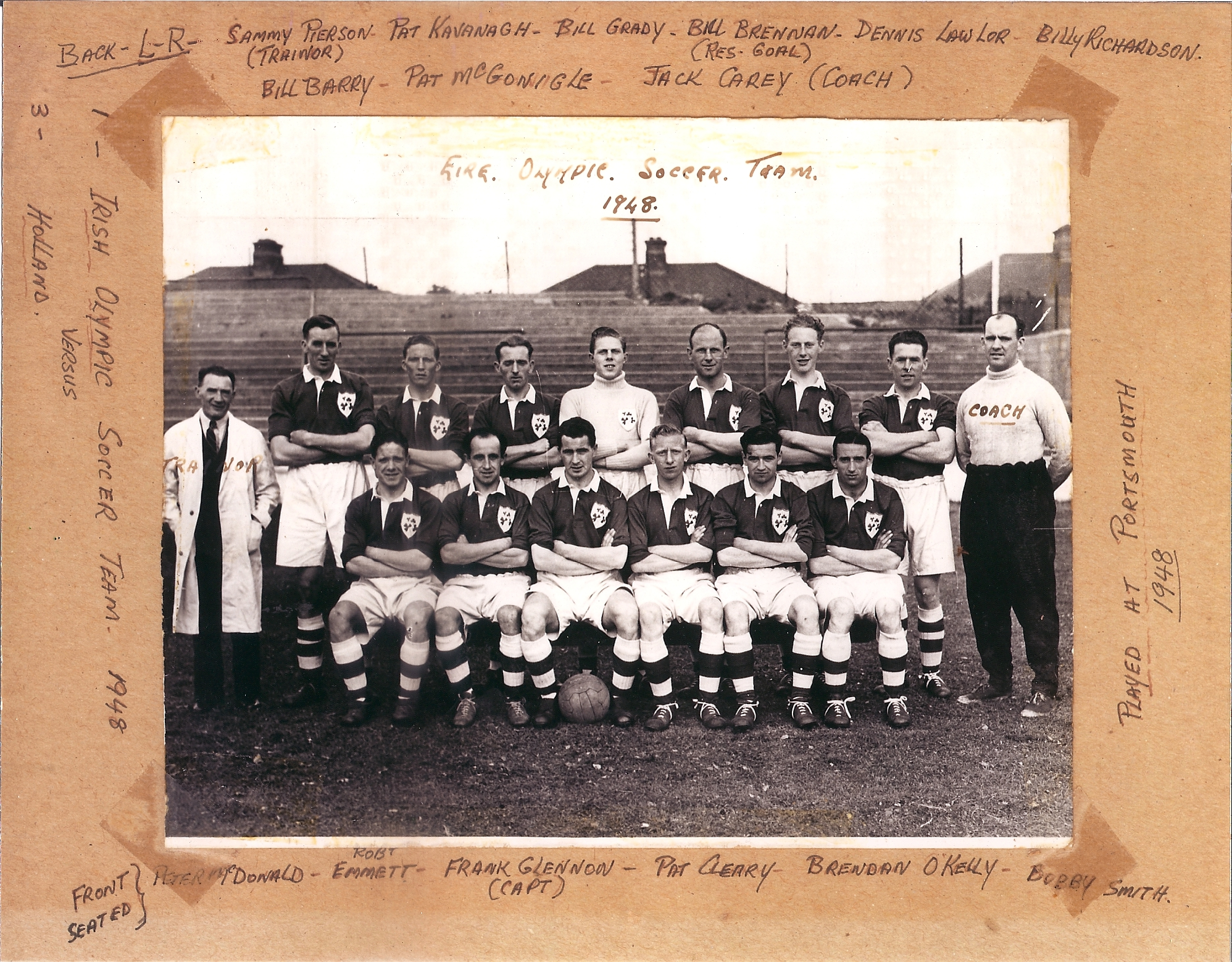
The Éire Olympic Soccer Team Played at Portsmouth.
