= Bernard Bienvenu =

French footballer (1920-1993)

Personal information
- Date of birth: 30 November 1920
- Place of birth: Fleury-les-Aubrais, Loiret, France
- Date of death: 13 July 1993 (aged 72)
- Place of death: Saint-Hilaire-Saint-Mesmin, Loiret, France

Senior career*
Years	Team	Apps	(Gls)
1948-1949	Stade Français-Red Star		

International career
1948	France Olympic football team	2	(0)
- * Club domestic league appearances and goals

Bernard Bienvenu (30 November 1920 – 13 July 1993) was a French footballer. He competed in the men's tournament at the 1948 Summer Olympics.

== Club career ==
In 1948-1949, he played for Stade Français-Red Star, Stade Français and Red Star having merged for 2 years, between 1948 and 1950, at that time.

== International career ==
He was selected in France Football squad for the 1948 Summer Olympics, and played France two Games against India and Great Britain, as France were eliminated in the Quarterfinals. He never had a cap with France senior team.
