= Jean Lanfranchi =

French footballer (1923–2017)

Personal information
- Date of birth: 20 March 1923
- Place of birth: Tunis, French protectorate of Tunisia
- Date of death: 5 December 2017 (aged 94)
- Place of death: Cazères, Haute-Garonne, France
- Position: Forward

Senior career*
Years	Team	Apps	(Gls)
1936–1942	Racing Club de Tunis		
1945–1948	US Cazères		
1948–1951	Toulouse FC (1937)	69	(12)
1951–1953	Marseille	48	(5)
1953–1957	Comminges Saint-Gaudens		
1957–1958	US Cazères		

International career
1948	France Olympic		

Managerial career
- 1957–1958: US Cazères
- * Club domestic league appearances and goals

Jean Lanfranchi (20 March 1923 – 5 December 2017) was a French footballer who played as a forward. He was part of France Football squad for the 1948 Summer Olympics alongside his brother Marcel Lanfranchi.

== Club career ==
Lanfranchi first played in his hometown club Racing Club de Tunis from 1936 to 1942 then US Cazères from 1945 to 1948, Toulouse FC (1937) from 1948 to 1951, Marseille from 1951 to 1953, Comminges Saint-Gaudens Football from 1953 to 1957 and US Cazères from 1957 to 1958.

== International career ==
Lanfranchi was selected in France Football squad for the 1948 Summer Olympics, alongside his brother Marcel Lanfranchi, but was an unused substitute for the two Games against India and Great Britain, as France were eliminated in the Quarterfinals. He never had a cap with France.

== Managerial career ==
In 1957–58 Lanfranchi managed US Cazères while he was still a player there.

== Personal life ==
He was the younger brother of Marcel Lanfranchi. They were born and died in the same towns, Tunis and Cazères. They were both selected for the 1948 Olympic Football tournament. They also played together at Toulouse FC (1937) and US Cazères and both managed the latter.
