= Hsu King-shing =

Chinese footballer (1910–1986)

- Born: 1910s Shanghai, China
- Died: 11 February 1986 (aged 75); British Hong Kong
- Other names: Joseph Hsu; Left-foot King
- Occupations: footballer; journalist; football manager; organization manager
- Years active: 1930s–1973
Board member of
Hong Kong Chinese Footballers' Fraternity	(chairman)
Children
Hsu Kuk-Lan	(daughter)
Hsu Che-Shek, Louis	(son)
Relatives
Fung Kai-Leung	(son-in-law)
Association football career
- Position: Midfielder
Senior career*
Years	Team	Apps	(Gls)
1937–1938	Kowloon Chinese		
1939–1941	Eastern		
1947–1948	Singtao		
1948–1949	St Joseph's		
1950–1951	Kwong Wah		
1951–1954	Singtao		
International career
1940s	Hong Kong		
Managerial career
- 1956–1957: Kwong Wah
- 1961–1973: Singtao
- 1963, 1969: Hong Kong Chinese (interim)
- 1967: Republic of China (interim)
- 1968–1970: Hong Kong (interim)
- 1971: Republic of China (interim)
- * Club domestic league appearances and goals

Chinese name
- Traditional Chinese: 許竟成
- Simplified Chinese: 许竟成
Transcriptions
Standard Mandarin
- Hanyu Pinyin: Xǔ Jìngchéng
- Wade–Giles: Hsu Ching Ch'eng
- Yale Romanization: Syu Jing Cheng
Yue: Cantonese
- Yale Romanization: Heui2 Ging2 Sing4
- Jyutping: Heoi2 Ging2 Sing4

Joseph Hsu King-shing also transliterated as Hsu King-Seng (1910s to 11 February 1986) was a Chinese professional football player and manager. Born in Shanghai, Hsu moved to Hong Kong to continue his professional career and never returned to the mainland China to play nor coach. He coached both Hong Kong and Republic of China (Taiwan), as well as managed Singtao for more than a decade.

Hsu was nicknamed Left-foot King (左腳王) during his career.

== Club career ==
Hsu started his career in Shanghai. Due to the Second Sino-Japanese War, Hsu, along his international teammate, Liu Shih-Tsan, left for Hong Kong to continue his career.

He played for Kowloon Chinese in 1937–38 season; Eastern in 1939–40, 1940–41 and 1941–42 season as well as the scratch team of South China in May 1941 for off-season friendlies.

His career was interrupted during Japanese occupation of Hong Kong from December 1941 to 1945.

After the war, he was a player for Singtao as a midfielder from 1947 to 1948 and again in May 1950 as a member of a scratch team for friendly matches He also played for Singtao in 1951–52 season to 1953–54 season.

He also played for St Joseph's in 1948–49 season and Kwong Wah in 1950–51 season.

== International career ==
It was reported that along with Liu Shih-Tsan (Chinese: 劉始讚), they represented China in international tournaments in Shanghai.

Due to the sponsorship of Singtao Sports Club owner Aw Hoe (Chinese: 胡好), Hsu was in the provisional squad of China national football team for 1948 Olympics. However, he was not selected to the final squad. Hsu traveled with team as an officer (Chinese: 幹事). According to Lee Wai Tong, on top of as a footballer of Singtao Sports Club, Hsu was also employed as a journalist of sister company Sing Tao Daily. (Note: Sing Tao Daily was owned by Aw Boon Haw, father of Aw Hoe) Hsu traveled with the Olympic team on the expense of the newspaper.

Hsu also represented Hong Kong in 1949 Hong Kong–Vietnam Interport against Saigon in 1949. Both teams were not a member of FIFA at that time.

== Coaching career ==
=== Kwong Wah ===
After retirement, he was the coach of several team. Hsu coached Kwong Wah in 1956–57 season.

=== Singtao ===
In 1961–62 season Hsu was hired as the manager (主任) of the football department (足球部) of Singtao Sports Club. Ge also served as a coach (教練). Singtao relegated in 1963. Hsu led Singtao to finished as 1963–64 runner-up of the second division. In 1965–66 season, Hsu remained as the manager but assisted by a non-Chinese expatriate, known as 阿基 in the Chinese language media, as volunteering coach. At that time, Singtao shared their ground with Hong Kong FC, a club with expatriate background. Hsu was the manager and coach of Singtao in 1966–67 season, before leading Republic of China (Taiwan) in July 1967. He returned as manager in the 1967–68 season. He was the manager (Note: A few different terms were used for the position 領隊, 主任 總經理 班主) of Singtao in the next few seasons: (1968–69, 1969–70, 1970–71, 1971–72 and 1972–73) Since 1970 he also handed over some of the coaching job to his assistant Tam Hon Sun (譚漢新). In 1972–73 season, Tam formally known as coach (教練) during Hsu's vacation to 1972 Summer Olympics. Ironically, the team relegated in 1973.

According to Hong Kong Companies Registry, Hsu was also the shareholder of Sing Tao Sports Club Limited along with the actual owner Sally Aw (Aw Sian, sister of Aw Hoe). Hsu and Aw each owned 1 share of HK$100 each, making the total paid-in share capital was HK$200. However, only Aw and Robert Eli Low, a solicitor, were the company directors. Sing Tao Sports Club Limited, incorporated on 27 September 1968, was the legal entity to run the sports club as a professional football club.

=== Interim coaches ===
==== Hong Kong Chinese ====
Hsu was elected by the Chinese Amateur Athletic Federation of Hong Kong (Note: known as Chinese: 華協, co-selected with "The Chinese Football Association of Hong Kong" (Chinese: 香港華人足球聯會, known as Chinese: 華足聯 in short)) to lead "Hong Kong Chinese representative team" (Chinese: 華聯) in 1956 Governor's Cup, against "Hong Kong-Westerners representative team", a non-Chinese team that was selected by the Hong Kong Football Association. He was selected as guest coach for "Hong Kong Chinese" in January 1963 for a match against West Germany-West Berlin mixed team as well as a match against South Korea in September in the Government Stadium. During as a guest coach for the Hong Kong Football Association in January 1969 for the Hong Kong team, he also collectively trained "Hong Kong Chinese" and Hong Kong League XI, leading "Hong Kong Chinese" to draw with Odense in 1969 Lunar New Year Cup (second of the three friendlies in the tournament). At that time it was a controversy, as "Hong Kong Chinese" was the feeder team of Republic of China (Taiwan); the players were based in Hong Kong but chose to represent China (Republic of China).

In July 1969 he once again leading Hong Kong Chinese representative team (Note: Both the words Chinese: 港華 and Chinese: 華聯 were used; Korean expatriate footballer of Singtao: Huh Yoon-jung also received call-up) for 1969 Ho Ho Cup, a friendly tournament against Malaysian Chinese, just a few weeks after leading Hong Kong League XI in exhibition matches that played in Hong Kong in June, as well as leading Singtao in exhibition matches that played in South Africa. However, the cup was later canceled.

In May 1970 he was nominated as the guest coach of "Hong Kong Chinese" (Chinese: 華聯) for a match against Olaria.

==== Republic of China (Taiwan) ====
Hsu led Republic of China (Taiwan) for 1968 AFC Asian Cup qualification, Pestabola Merdeka and 1968 Olympics qualification in summer 1967. Despite known officially as Republic of China (or still claiming the name China), the government only controlled Taiwan and some islands after losing the civil war. Ironically, the national team was composed of mainly Hong Kong based Chinese diaspora, which they refused to represent Hong Kong nor newly established People's Republic of China.

Hong Kong businessman Gordon Wu was also nominated as [honorary] manager (Chinese: 領隊) of the national team.

==== Hong Kong / Hong Kong League XI ====
Hsu was also nominated as manager (Note: The word Chinese: 管理 and Chinese: 領隊 were used in the news) and guest coach (Chinese: 教練) for the Hong Kong Football Association in November 1968 on a three-month contract, for friendlies against 1860 Munich in December and 1969 Lunar New Year Cup against Odense. He later became a volunteering coach for Hong Kong FA in the whole year, on top of his job in Singtao.

The exhibition match against 1860 Munich was later expended to three matches, with Hsu selected players from Hong Kong (Chinese: 港隊), Hong Kong League XI (Note: The word Chinese: 港聯 and Chinese: 香港聯賽選手隊 were used in the news) and Hong Kong Chinese (Chinese: 華聯) (Note: Consisted of players represented ROC) to the training camp, despite criticism on training players that ineligible to Hong Kong. He did it once again in January 1969 for the preparation for the match against Odense. Hsu led Hong Kong League XI to win, Hong Kong and "Hong Kong Chinese" to draw against Odense in the first three friendlies on The Government Stadium in the Hong Kong Island, but leading Singtao to lose to the Danish team on 24 February on Police Club Stadium in Kowloon.

In June 1969 he was the coach of Hong Kong League XI (Note: Cheung Chi Doy, represented ROC, also receive call-up) for the exhibition matches against a team from UK and Borussia Mönchengladbach.

Hsu was also nominated as coach for Hong Kong team for 1970 Lunar New Year Cup, but assisted by three younger coaches who completed their training in Japan. Hong Kong 2–6 losing to Slavia Prague. In May 1970, he was nominated by Hong Kong as manager and coach for 1970 Jakarta Anniversary Tournament. Hong Kong finished as the fourth. Hsu also refused to lead Hong Kong in 1970 Pestabola Merdeka, due to the clash with Singtao pre-season tour, making Jakarta Anniversary Tournament the only international match he led.

==== Second term of Republic of China (Taiwan) ====
After handing over the coaching of Hong Kong team and Hong Kong League XI to various coaches, Hsu was nominated as guest coach of Republic of China (Taiwan) again in June 1971 for 1971 Pestabola Merdeka. However, the players were still selected in Hong Kong by The Chinese Amateur Athletic Federation of Hong Kong. Before the start of the tournament in August, Hsu was replaced by Pau King Yin. It was reported that Hsu had kidney stone in June 1971, rumoring that he cannot join the pre-season tour of Singtao starting on 24 June.

== Other career ==
Hsu was the member of the first board of Hong Kong Chinese Footballers' Fraternity (Chinese: 香港華人足球員聯誼會) (Note: Not to be confused with "The Chinese Football Association of Hong Kong") in 1956. Hsu became the chairman of Hong Kong Chinese Footballers' Fraternity in 1968–69 financial year. His term was extended in October 1972 by re-election. He was re-elected again in 1973 and 1976.

== Personal life ==
Hsu's daughter (Chinese: 許谷蘭) married a footballer (Chinese: 馮紀良), which the father of Hsu's son-in-law was Fung King Cheong, also a footballer and manager of Singtao.

Hsu's son Louis Hsu Che-Shek (Chinese: 許子石) is a tennis player who represented Hong Kong, as well as a medical doctor. Louis Hsu was involved in the invention of halo-pelvic traction, a medical operation led by John O'Brien. Louis Hsu also wrote some research papers on the topic.

Hsu died in Queen Mary Hospital, Hong Kong Island on 11 February 1986.
