= Guy Rabstejnek =

French footballer (1924–2003)

Personal information
- Date of birth: 7 August 1924
- Place of birth: Saint-Malo, France
- Date of death: 27 January 2003 (aged 78)
- Place of death: Saint Barthélemy, France

Senior career*
Years	Team	Apps	(Gls)
?–1946	US Saint-Malo		
1946–1951	Rennes	80	(11)
1951–1953	Monaco	45	(3)
1959–1960	Pau FC		

International career
1948	France Olympic		
- * Club domestic league appearances and goals

Guy Rabstejnek (7 August 1924 – 31 January 2003) was a French footballer. He was part of the France Olympic football team's squad for 1948 Summer Olympics.

== Club career ==
Rabstejnek started his career at US Saint-Malo and stayed there until 1946. He then played for Rennes from 1946 to 1951. From 1951 to 1953 he played at Monaco. He played one season for Pau FC, in 1959–1960.

== International career ==
Rabstejnek was selected in France Olympic football team's squad for 1948 Summer Olympics, but was an unused substitute for the two Games against India and Great Britain, as France were eliminated in the quarterfinals. He never had a cap with France.
