= Hacène Hamoutène =

French footballer (1913–1993)

Personal information
- Date of birth: 26 September 1913
- Place of birth: Tizi Ouzou, French Algeria, France
- Date of death: 12 December 1993 (aged 80)
- Place of death: Tizi Ouzou, Algeria
- Position: Midfielder

Senior career*
Years	Team	Apps	(Gls)
1947–1950	MC Alger		

International career
1948	France Olympic	Called up	

Managerial career
- 1948–1949: MC Alger
- 1962–1963: JS Kabylie
- * Club domestic league appearances and goals

Hacène Hamoutène (26 September 1913 – 12 December 1993) was a French footballer who played as a midfielder. He was part of France Football squad for the 1948 Summer Olympics.

== Club career ==
He notably played for Algerian club MC Alger from 1947 to 1950, at a time when Algeria was part of France.

== Managerial career ==
He started his managerial career at MC Alger in 1948–1949 while he was still a player there, and then from 1952 to 1966 he coached JS Kabylie.

== International career ==
He was selected in France's Football squad for the 1948 Summer Olympics, but was an unused substitute for the two games against India and Great Britain, as France were eliminated in the quarterfinals. He never had a cap with France.
