= Marius Colau =

French footballer (1922–2006)

Personal information
- Date of birth: 31 January 1922
- Place of birth: Reims, Marne, France
- Date of death: 1 January 2006 (aged 83)
- Place of death: Annecy, Haute-Savoie, France

Senior career*
Years	Team	Apps	(Gls)
1947–949	Rennes		

International career
1948	France Olympic football team	2	(0)
- * Club domestic league appearances and goals

Marius Colau (31 January 1922 – 1 January 2006) was a French footballer. He competed in the men's tournament at the 1948 Summer Olympics.

== Club career ==
He played for Rennes. between 1947 and 1949.

== International career ==
He was selected in France Football squad for the 1948 Summer Olympics, and played two games, against India and Great Britain, as France were eliminated in the quarterfinals. He never had a cap with France.
