= Raymond Beckman =

American soccer player

Raymond Paul "Ray" Beckman (June 30, 1925 – July 13, 2011) was an American soccer player who was a member of the 1948 U.S. Olympic soccer team. He also earned two caps with the U.S. national team that year.

Born in St. Louis, Missouri, Beckman joined the U.S. Navy during World War II. He served as an electrician aboard the hospital ship USS Comfort, and survived a 1945 kamikaze attack that killed 30 and wounded 48. After the war, he returned to St. Louis where he worked as a firefighter for 18 years until he was injured while fighting a fire.

He also played soccer in the St. Louis leagues. In 1948, Beckman was playing for De Andries in the St. Louis Major League when he was selected for the U.S. soccer team that competed at the Summer Olympics. He played all 90 minutes in the 9–0 loss to Italy that eliminated the U.S. from the tournament. After the Olympics, the U.S. played two full internationals, an 11–0 loss to Norway, followed by a 5–0 loss to Northern Ireland on August 11, 1948.

In 1949, he began coaching high school soccer at John Burroughs School. He was inducted into the St. Louis Soccer Hall of Fame in 1980. He retired from JBS in 2000 after 51 years of coaching.

A soccer tournament and stadium are named for Beckman, honoring his contributions to soccer in St. Louis.
