= Marcel Lanfranchi =

French footballer (1921–2013)

Personal information
- Date of birth: 11 January 1921
- Place of birth: Tunis, French protectorate of Tunisia
- Date of death: 10 September 2013 (aged 92)
- Place of death: Cazères, Haute-Garonne, France
- Position: Forward

Senior career*
| Years | Team | Apps | (Gls) |
| 1946-1947 | US Cazères | | |
| 1948-1952 | Toulouse FC (1937) | 69 | (12) |
| 1952-1953 | US Perpignan | 15 | (4) |

International career
| 1948 | France Olympic | | |

Managerial career
- FC Tarascon
- US Bagnères Luchon
- US Cazères
- AS Porto Vecchio
- * Club domestic league appearances and goals

Marcel Lanfranchi (11 January 1921 – 10 September 2013) was a French footballer who played as a forward. He was part of France Football squad for the 1948 Summer Olympics alongside his brother Jean Lanfranchi.

== Personal life ==
He was the older brother of Jean Lanfranchi.They were born and died in the same towns, Tunis and Cazères. They were both selected for the 1948 Football Olympic Tournament. They also both played for Toulouse FC (1937) and US Cazères and they both managed the latter.

== Club career ==
Lanfranchi played from 1946 to 1948 at US Cazères. Then from 1948 to 1952 he went to Toulouse FC (1937). He ended his career at US Perpignan in the 1952–53 season.

== International career ==
Lanfranchi was selected in France Football squad for the 1948 Summer Olympics, alongside his brother Jean, but was an unused substitute for the two Games against India and Great Britain, as France were eliminated in the Quarterfinals. He never had a cap with France.

== Managerial career ==
Lanfranchi managed FC Tarascon, US Bagnères Luchon, US Cazères and AS Porto Vecchio.
