= Yan Shixin =

Chinese footballer

Personal information
- Date of birth: 1918
- Date of death: 1993 (aged 74–75)
- Position: Defender

International career
Years	Team	Apps	(Gls)
- China

Yan Shixin (1918–1993) was a Chinese footballer. He competed in the men's tournament at the 1948 Summer Olympics.
