= François Magnani =

Luxembourgish footballer

Personal information
- Date of birth: 7 June 1928
- Place of birth: Schifflange, Luxembourg
- Date of death: 5 March 1998 (aged 69)
- Place of death: Schifflange, Luxembourg
- Position: Goalkeeper

International career
Years	Team	Apps	(Gls)
1948–1951	Luxembourg	8	(0)

François Magnani (7 June 1928 – 5 March 1998) was a Luxembourgish footballer. He played in eight matches for the Luxembourg national football team from 1948 to 1951. He was also part of Luxembourg's squad for the football tournament at the 1948 Summer Olympics, but he did not play in any matches.
