= Thomas Hopper (footballer) =

English footballer (1915–1972)

Personal information
- Full name: Albert Horace Hopper
- Date of birth: 10 April 1915
- Place of birth: Kent, England
- Date of death: 1972 (aged 56–57)
- Place of death: Kent, England

Senior career*
Years	Team	Apps	(Gls)
????–1949	Bromley		
1949–1950	Canterbury City		
1950–????	Bromley		

International career
1948	Great Britain	1	(0)
- * Club domestic league appearances and goals

Albert Horace "Tommy" Hopper (10 April 1915 – 1972) was an English footballer who represented Great Britain at the 1948 Summer Olympics. Hopper played amateur football for Bromley and Canterbury City.
