= Chang King Hai =

Chinese footballer

- Traditional Chinese: 張金海
- Simplified Chinese: 张金海
Transcriptions
Standard Mandarin
- Hanyu Pinyin: Zhāng Jīn Hǎi
- Wade–Giles: Chang Chin Hai
- Yale Romanization: Jang Jin Hai
Yue: Cantonese
- Yale Romanization: Jeung1 Gam1 Hoi2
- Jyutping: Zoeng1 Gam1 Hoi2

Chang King Hai (1917 – 16 August 1973), also romanizated as Cheong Kam-hoi, was a Chinese professional footballer who played at the 1948 Olympics.

== Career ==
Born and started his career in Shanghai, he moved to Hong Kong, in the British Empire due to the Second Sino-Japanese War. He was a player of Eastern in the 1939–40 season.

Chang represented China at the 1948 Olympics. He also represented Hong Kong in 1949 Hong Kong–Vietnam Interport against Saigon in 1949. Both teams were not a member of FIFA at that time.

== Personal life ==
His sons Cheung Chi Doy and Cheung Chi Wai were born in Hong Kong, but represented Republic of China (Taiwan), instead of Hong Kong or People's Republic of China.
