= José Rodríguez (footballer, born 1922) =

Mexican footballer (1922–1992)

Personal information
- Full name: José Luis Rodríguez Peralta
- Date of birth: 5 November 1922
- Place of birth: Tampico, Tamaulipas, Mexico
- Date of death: 7 October 1992 (aged 69)
- Place of death: Monterrey, Mexico

International career
Years	Team	Apps	(Gls)
1948	Mexico	1	(0)

José Luis Rodríguez Peralta (5 November 1922 – 7 October 1992) was a Mexican footballer. He competed in the men's tournament at the 1948 Summer Olympics. Rodríguez died in Monterrey on 7 October 1992, at the age of 69.
