= Tze Kam Hung =

Hong Kong footballer

- Traditional Chinese: 謝錦洪
- Simplified Chinese: 谢锦洪
Transcriptions
Standard Mandarin
- Hanyu Pinyin: Xiè Jǐnhóng
Yue: Cantonese
- Jyutping: Ze6 Gam2 Hung4

Tze Kam Hung is a Hong Kong footballer who competed for the Republic of China in the 1948 Summer Olympics.
