= Jorge Ruiz (Mexican footballer) =

Mexican footballer (1928-2013)

Personal information
- Full name: Jorge José Ruiz Aguilar
- Date of birth: 13 May 1928
- Date of death: 2 October 2016 (aged 88)

International career
Years	Team	Apps	(Gls)
- Mexico

Jorge José Ruiz Aguilar (13 May 1928 – 2 October 2016) was a Mexican footballer. He competed in the men's tournament at the 1948 Summer Olympics.
