= Wim Landman =

Dutch footballer

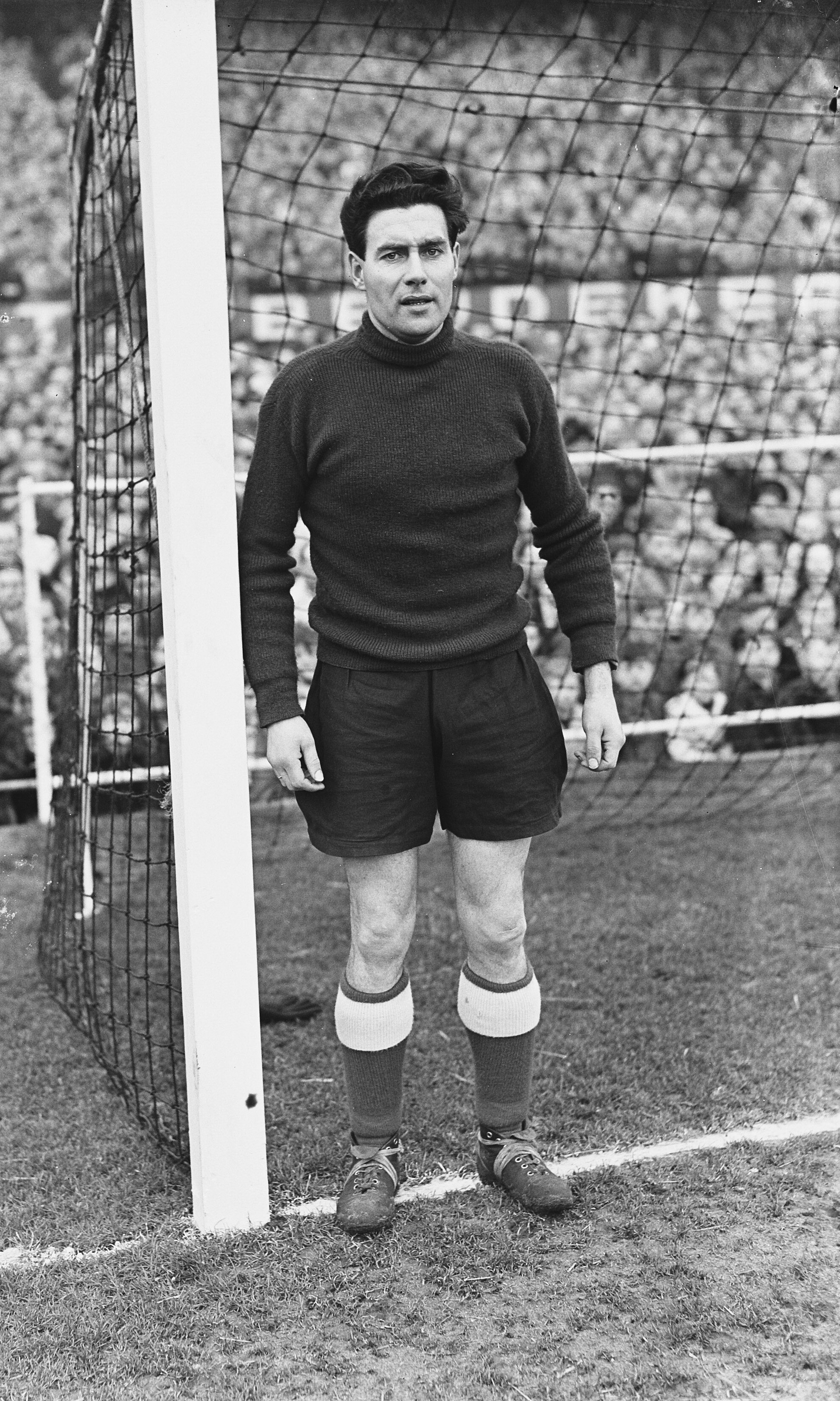
- Landman in 1952

Personal information
- Date of birth: 13 April 1921
- Place of birth: Rotterdam, Netherlands
- Date of death: 27 June 1975 (aged 54)
- Place of death: Bleiswijk, Netherlands
- Position: Goalkeeper

Senior career*
Years	Team	Apps	(Gls)
–1949	Neptunus		
1949–1954	Sparta		
1954–1962	SHS		

International career
1952–1956	Netherlands	7	(0)
- * Club domestic league appearances and goals

Wim Landman (13 April 1921 – 27 June 1975) was a Dutch footballer who played as a goalkeeper. He played in seven matches for the Netherlands national team between 1952 and 1956.

== Club career ==
=== Neptunus and Sparta ===
Earlier than fellow Dutch goalkeeper Frans de Munck, Landman was nicknamed "The Black Panther", due to his black hair and technique which, despite suffering from rheumatism, was elegant and supple. Landman started his career with Rotterdam club Neptunus before joining Sparta Rotterdam in 1949; a controversial move. In the club magazine of Neptunus, De Revue, the later Het Vrije Volk journalist and Omroepvereniging VARA quizmaster Theo Eerdmans denounced the transfer with words like "shame" and "unworthy of club sport". All the more because Landman made the move at the age of 28.

=== SHS ===
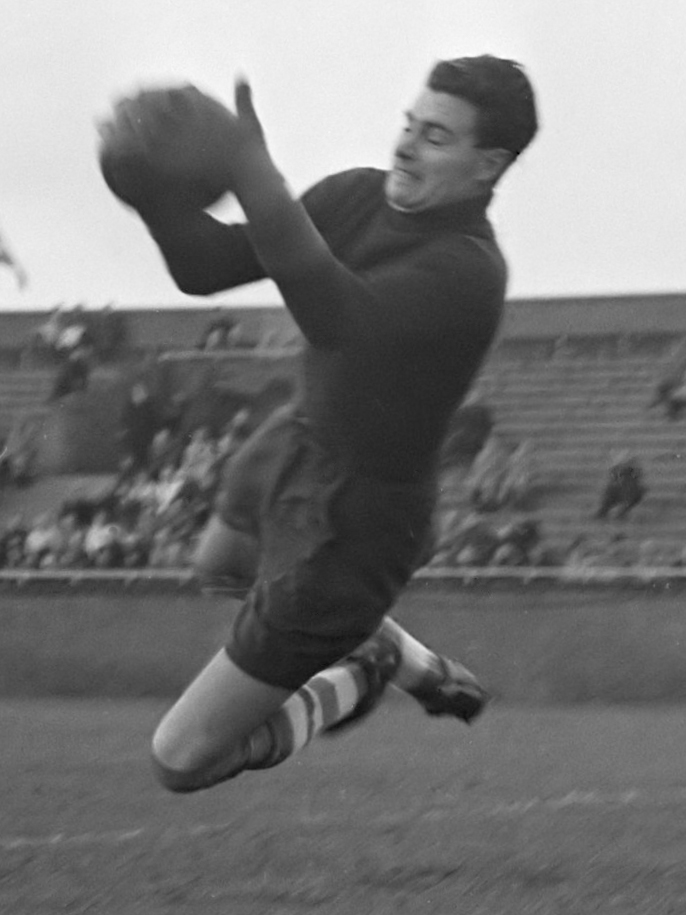
Landman with Neptunus in 1947

In 1954, Landman returned to the pitch. He was offered a professional contract with one of the first initiatives to practice professional football in the Netherlands: BVC Rotterdam. The club did not exist for long and eventually merged into Holland Sport, which later became Scheveningen Holland Sport (SHS). From the 1954–55 season, Landman played for this club and gained three more caps for the Netherlands.

=== Allegations of match fixing ===
Particularly weak performances in matches of SHS against NAC and BVV led to rumours that Landman had been bribed. In the case of the game against BVV on 27 May 1956, this was deemed a fact for a long time, because the KNVB suspended him for a year and a half in 1959 after it came to light. But in the meantime, bribery had not been proven.

On 16 March 1959, the list of those suspended in the BVV affair was published in the Sportkroniek, the official paper of the KNVB. The list mentioned Landman, who was to be suspended from 16 March 1959 to 1 July 1960 for initially accepting a proposal for bribery, for failing to notify the KNVB of this attempt at bribery and for making an incomplete and incorrect statement at first. A handful of the eleven board members of BVV were suspended for "serious negligence" in relation to a payments to amateur players. The suspensions for the board members were considerably longer than the Landsman suspension, and varied from one to twelve years. All newspapers took the literal text from the Sportkroniek. The daily newspaper De Tijd, Nieuwsblad van het Zuiden and the weekly magazines Sport and Sportwereld and the Wereldkroniek checked the publication at the KNVB and found on 16 March 1959 that bribery had not been proven in Landman's case.

Wim Landman's bribe attempt was planned in 1956 in the supporters' café of BVV, called "De Kiek". One of the three bribers subsequently died when the KNVB started the investigation in March 1959. In 1961, the secretary of BVV died from the consequences of the affair.

=== Return to football ===
On 1 January 1961, Landman made his return to SHS. At that time, Landman only had nine fingers after having jumped over a fence with his ring sticking to the barbed wire, which required his finger to be amputated. After the 1961–62 season he retired from football.

== International career ==
During the 1948 Summer Olympics in London, he was the standard bearer of the Dutch team. Also four years later he was among the participants in the 1952 Summer Olympics in Helsinki. From that year, 1952, he played four times for the Netherlands national team. After not being called up for the international match against Norway on 27 September 1953, Landman, who had been known for his vanity, ended his international career abruptly; he felt that he was not taken seriously by the Royal Dutch Football Association (KNVB). "I didn't even go and watch the games anymore, because then I just got upset and a person shouldn't get too excited. That is bad for health."

== Death ==
On the morning of 27 June 1975, Landman took his own life, jumping in front of a train in Bleiswijk.
