= Hou Zong-Sheng =

- Traditional Chinese: 侯榕生
- Simplified Chinese: 侯榕生
Transcriptions
Standard Mandarin
- Hanyu Pinyin: Hóu Róng Shēng

pen name
- Traditional Chinese: 吳瑛
Transcriptions

Hou Zong-Sheng was a writer in Chinese language. Born in Fuzhou, China, her given name Zong-Sheng (Chinese: 榕生; pinyin: Róng Shēng; lit. 'Born in Rong') was named after the alternative name of the city: Rong (Chinese: 榕; pinyin: Róng). During the Chinese Civil War, she migrated to Taiwan from the mainland China in 1949. She then studied in the University of Santo Tomas in the 1960s and then migrated to the United States.

== Early life ==
Hou's ancestral home was located in Wuqing, Hebei Province (now belongs to Tianjin, a direct-controlled municipality). However, she was born in Fuzhou, Fujian province and spent her childhood in Beijing, Hebei Province (now also a direct-controlled municipality). She was graduated from Fu Jen Catholic University, before the university was relocated from Beijing to Taiwan.

== Selected works ==
- Hou, Zong-Sheng (1975). Hou Rongsheng xuan ji 侯榕生選集 [Selected works of Hou Zong-Sheng] (in Traditional Chinese). Taipei: 水芙蓉出版社 [Shui fu rong chu ban she]. OCLC 20861082.
