= Hong Kong national football team =

Men's national association football team

Hong Kong, China
- Association: Football Association of Hong Kong, China (HKFA) 中國香港足球總會
- Confederation: AFC (Asia)
- Sub-confederation: EAFF (East Asia)
- Head coach: Roberto Losada
- Captain: Yapp Hung Fai
- Most caps: Yapp Hung Fai (112)
- Top scorer: Chan Siu Ki (40)
- Home stadium: Kai Tak Sports Park; Hong Kong Stadium; Mong Kok Stadium
- FIFA code: HKG
First colours	Second colours

FIFA ranking
- Current: 152 ▲1 (18 November 2026)
- Highest: 90 (21 February 1996)
- Lowest: 172 (7 November 2012)

First international
- South Korea 3–3 Hong Kong (Manila, Philippines; 2 May 1954)

Biggest win
- Hong Kong 15–0 Guam (Taipei, Taiwan; 7 March 2005)

Biggest defeat
- China 7–0 Hong Kong (Guangzhou, China; 17 November 2004); Hong Kong 0–7 Paraguay (So Kon Po, Hong Kong; 17 November 2010); Hong Kong 0–7 Argentina (So Kon Po, Hong Kong; 14 October 2014)

Asian Cup
- Appearances: 4 (first in 1956)
- Best result: Third place (1956)

ASEAN Challenge Cup (as guest)
- Appearances: 1 (first in 2026)
- Best result: Champions (2026)

EAFF E-1 Football Championship
- Appearances: 5 (first in 2003)
- Best result: Fourth place (2003, 2010, 2019, 2022, 2025)
Medal record
Men's football
AFC Asian Cup
Bronze medal – third place	1956 Hong Kong	Team
FIFA ASEAN Challenge Cup
Gold medal – first place	2026 Hong Kong	Team

The Hong Kong national football team (Chinese: 香港足球代表隊; Cantonese Yale: Hēunggóng jūkkàuh doihbíu deuih; recognised as Hong Kong, China by FIFA) represents Hong Kong in international football and is controlled by the Football Association of Hong Kong, China, the governing body for football in Hong Kong.

Hong Kong have never qualified for the FIFA World Cup. They hosted the first AFC Asian Cup in 1956 and won third place, also reaching the semifinals in 1964. Hong Kong did not qualify for another AFC tournament until 2023. They have also qualified for the EAFF E-1 Football Championship five times, in 2003, 2010, 2019, 2022 and 2025.

Hong Kong also hosted and won the inaugural FIFA ASEAN Challenge Cup in 2026.

== History ==
=== Establishment and pre-WWII era ===
Before Hong Kong became a member of FIFA in 1954, Hong Kong began playing in the Hong Kong–Macau Interport tournament in 1937, which was one of the oldest competitions co-held by Hong Kong as well as continuously played. There were other interport tournaments in the past, such as the Shanghai-Hong Kong Interport which was first held in 1908. At that time the team was composed of ethnic Chinese as well as western expatriates, as in the 1935 and 1937 edition of Shanghai-Hong Kong Interport. There was another Interport tournament against Saigon. The aforementioned Macau, Shanghai and Saigon were not a member of FIFA nor a sovereign nation at that time, with Hong Kong and Macau only having joined FIFA in 1954 and 1978 respectively.

The China national team that participated in 1936 and 1948 Summer Olympics, were mainly composed of ethnic Chinese players from Hong Kong, most famously Lee Wai Tong. After WWII, a number of Shanghai-based players began representing Hong Kong, such as Chang King Hai and Hsu King Shing.

=== FIFA member (1954–present) ===
The Hong Kong FA became a member of FIFA and the Asian Football Confederation in 1954. Since then Hong Kong played their first FIFA-recognised international match against other countries. The HKFA also sent a scratch team for 1957 Merdeka Tournament, which was composed of players from Eastern due to their proximity, plus few players from other clubs. The club was having a pre-season tour in South Asia, thus the HKFA invited the club to represent Hong Kong. However, some of the players were in fact ineligible to play for Hong Kong, as they were ROC (Taiwan) international players.

Hong Kong qualified for three of the first four editions of the Asian Cup, including a third-place finish in the 1956 edition as host. At that time, most Hong Kong players represented Republic of China; they finished third in the Asian Cup in the 1960 edition, leaving more inferior players to the proper Hong Kong team.

The 1998 World Cup Asian qualifiers was considered one of Hong Kong's darkest moments as it was hit by a match-fixing scandal that involved former Sing Tao striker Chan Tsz-Kong who was found guilty and jailed for a year after he bribed players to throw and lose a match against Thailand. Others who were involved include goalkeeper Kevin Lok Kar-Win, defenders Chan Chi-Keung and Lau Chi Yuen and striker Wai Kwan-Lung.

==== Football fever in 2015 ====
In 2015, a short football fever appeared during the 2018 FIFA World Cup qualification matches in Hong Kong under the guidance of Kim Pan Gon, as Hong Kong had been drawn into the same group with their fierce rival, China. Due to the tensions built up from the Hong Kong–Mainland China conflict, many local citizens became interested in this year's campaign; all four home matches were recorded as a sellout. Hong Kong ended the campaign with 4 victories against Bhutan and Maldives, 2 scoreless draws against China, and 2 losses against Qatar.

==== Post-Kim era ====
In late 2018, after the sudden departure of Kim Pan-gon, English coach Gary White was hired as the new head coach in which under his guidance, he helped Hong Kong secure qualification for their third appearance at the EAFF E-1 Football Championship finals after a narrow win against Chinese Taipei, a draw against North Korea and a heavy win against Mongolia. Shortly afterwards, White departed from the role.

In April 2019, Hong Kong appointed Finnish coach Mixu Paatelainen as the new head coach of the national football team in time for the 2022 FIFA World Cup qualifiers and the 2019 EAFF E-1 Football Championship tournament. His first game in charge ended in a disappointing and surprising loss at home during friendly international against Chinese Taipei. After a run of poor performances throughout the World Cup qualifiers and the 2019 EAFF E-1 Football Championship, Mixu Paatelainen's contract was not renewed.

==== Return to the Asian Cup ====
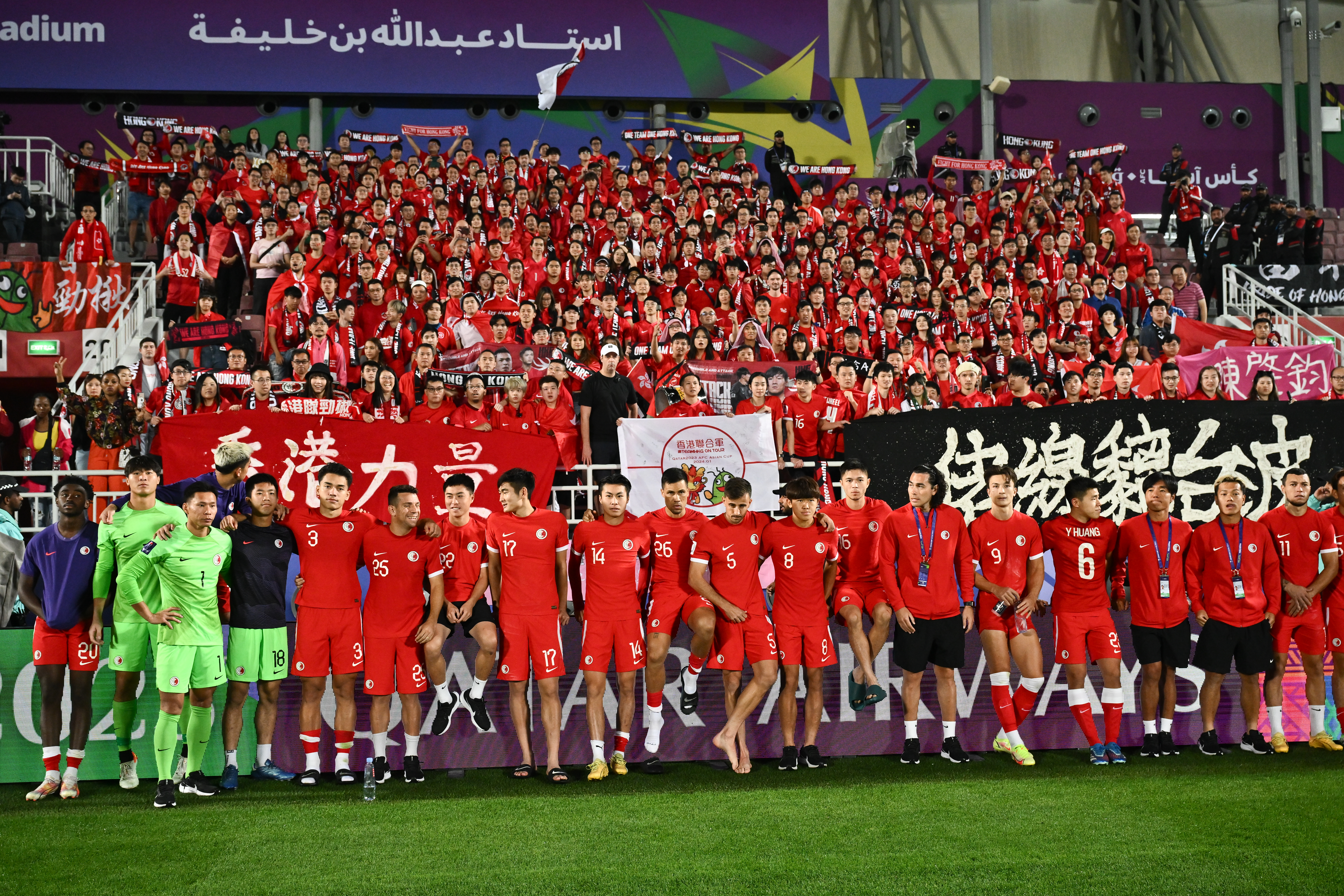
Hong Kong's 2023 Asian Cup team.

On 13 December 2021, Norwegian coach Jørn Andersen who formerly guided North Korea was named as the new head coach succeeding Mixu Paatelainen in preparation for the third round of qualification of the 2023 AFC Asian Cup. He guided Hong Kong to qualify for the 2023 AFC Asian Cup by beating Afghanistan 2–1 and Cambodia 3–0, reaching the final tournament after a 55-year absence.

On 15 January 2024, Hong Kong then kicked off their 2023 Asian Cup campaign against UAE in which they lost 3–1 in the opening match where Chan Siu Kwan scored the 1,000th goal in the AFC Asian Cup history. They eventually finished the campaign at the bottom of their group after losses against Iran (0–1) and Palestine (0–3).

==== Post-Asian Cup times ====
On 29 May 2024, Jørn Andersen announced his resignation as head coach of the Hong Kong national team after over 2 years in charge. On 28 August 2024, English manager Ashley Westwood was appointed as the new head coach of the Hong Kong national football team, succeeding Jørn Andersen. In September 2024, Hong Kong travelled to Fiji and played two friendly matches against Oceania countries, Solomon Islands and Fiji. In October 2024, the team also travelled to Europe for the first time where they played against Liechtenstein. On 8 December 2024, Yapp Hung Fai became the first-ever Hong Kong player to reach 100 international caps against Mongolia during the 2025 EAFF E-1 Football Championship Preliminary Round.

==== Kai Tak fever in 2025 ====
On 10 June 2025, Hong Kong played their 2027 AFC Asian Cup qualification home game against India at the Kai Tak Stadium for the first time, which resulted in a 1–0 win for the hosts in the stadium's maiden official football match. All tickets were sold out and a new attendance record was set for a Hong Kong football match with 42,570 spectators.

On 18 November, Hong Kong failed to qualify for the 2027 AFC Asian Cup after succumbing to a 1–2 loss against Singapore in front of a record crowd of 47,762. On 24 November, Ashley Westwood stepped down from the role.

After Westwood's departure, the HKFA appointed former Eastern SC Roberto Losada as their interim coach leading up to the national team's final 2027 AFC Asian Cup final qualication match against India which ended in a loss. Among 300 applicants, Losada was then appointed as the permanent Hong Kong national team's head coach in early June. His side started off with a friendly international win against Mongolia at home and then an away loss to Cambodia.

==== First title ====

Hong Kong starting line-up against Cambodia at the final match of FIFA ASEAN Challenge Cup.

From 24 September to 4 October 2026, Hong Kong hosted the inaugural FIFA ASEAN Challenge Cup as an invited participant. They defeated Laos and Brunei 4–0 and 2–0 respectively in the group stage. In the final, Hong Kong defeated Cambodia 2–0 to capture the championshipat Kai Tak Stadium—marking the team's first-ever title in a FIFA-sanctioned international tournament.

== Team image ==
=== Kits ===
The national team's home kit is typically a red shirt, red shorts, and red or white socks, while the away kit features white shirts, white shorts, and red or white socks.

==== Kit suppliers ====
Kit supplier	Period
Puma	1970s–1998
Adidas	1998
Diadora	2000–2005
Adidas	2005–2011
Nike	2011–present

=== Crest ===
The crest of the Hong Kong national football team features a Chinese dragon. This logo has consistently been used as the team's emblem. The HKFA emblem was not used on jerseys until 31 May 2011, HKFA debuted current emblem for the national team.

=== Home stadiums ===
The team's primary stadium is Kai Tak Stadium. For selected friendly matches and minor qualification matches, the Hong Kong team plays most often at the Hong Kong Stadium and Mong Kok Stadium.

The Jockey Club HKFA Football Training Centre is currently the main training ground for the Hong Kong national and youth teams.

=== Rivalries ===
==== China ====
Hong Kong maintains a specific rivalry with China. The rivalry began in 1978 and on 19 May 1985, Hong Kong produced a shock 2–1 upset in Beijing in the 1986 World Cup qualifying game, leading to unrest by Chinese supporters.

Since then, China was unbeaten against to Hong Kong but the rivalry continues and even got heated up since the conflict between Hong Kong and China in the 2010s.

On 1 January 2024, Hong Kong defeated China 2–1 in a closed door FIFA international friendly, marking their first victory in 29 years.

==== Macau ====
The Hong Kong–Macau rivalry has been contested by Hong Kong Football Association and Macau Football Association since 1937.

== Results and fixtures ==
The following is a list of match results in the last 12 months, as well as any future matches that have been scheduled.

Win Draw Loss

=== 2026 ===
31 March 2027 ACQ R3	India	2–1	Hong Kong	Kochi, India
19:00 UTC+5:30	Williams 4'; Mishra 50'	Report; Report (AFC)	Camargo 65'	Stadium: Jawaharlal Nehru International Stadium; Attendance: 22,690; Referee: Songkran Bunmeekiart (Thailand)

5 June Friendly	Hong Kong	2–0	Mongolia	So Kon Po, Hong Kong
20:00 UTC+8	Juninho 5'; Ng Yu Hei 81'	Report		Stadium: Hong Kong Stadium; Attendance: 6,016; Referee: Hoàng Ngọc Hà (Vietnam)

9 June Friendly	Cambodia	2–0	Hong Kong	Phnom Penh, Cambodia
19:00 UTC+7	Ogawa 45+1'; Chanthea 50'	Report		Stadium: Olympic Stadium; Attendance: 20,685; Referee: Yudi Nurcahya (Indonesia)

27 September 2026 FIFA ASEAN Challenge Cup Group A	Hong Kong	4–0	Laos	Kai Tak, Hong Kong
15:00 UTC+8	Sun Ming Him 12'; Camargo 33'; Dudu 55'; Orr 90+1' (pen.)	FIFA Report; GSA Report		Stadium: Kai Tak Stadium; Attendance: 18,873; Referee: Sanzhar Zhakypbekov (Kyrgyzstan)

30 September 2026 FIFA ASEAN Challenge Cup Group A	Hong Kong	2–0	Brunei	Kai Tak, Hong Kong
20:00 UTC+8	Chan Siu Kwan 60'; Orr 90+1'	FIFA Report; GSA Report		Stadium: Kai Tak Stadium; Attendance: 20,116; Referee: Abdullo Davlatov (Tajikistan)

3 October 2026 FIFA ASEAN Challenge Cup Final	Hong Kong	2–0	Cambodia	Kai Tak, Hong Kong
18:00 UTC+8	Orr 41'; Camargo 58' (pen.)	FIFA Report		Stadium: Kai Tak Stadium; Attendance: 31,374; Referee: Sanzhar Zhakypbekov (Kyrgyzstan)

== Coaching staff ==
Position	Name
Head coach	(Hong Kong) Roberto Losada
Assistant coaches	(Hong Kong) Fernando Recio
Assistant coaches	(Hong Kong) Cristiano Cordeiro
Assistant coaches	(Hong Kong) Chu Chi Kwong
Goalkeeping coach	(Hong Kong) Fan Chun Yip
Analyst	(Hong Kong) Anson Lee
Fitness coach	(Hong Kong) Stephen Wong

=== Coaching history ===
Name	Coaching career	Played	Won	Drawn	Lost	Win %	Points per game (Note: Calculated by multiplying wins by 3, plus draws, divided by games.)
(England) Eric Keen	1948						
(Scotland) Tom Sneddon	1954–1956	6	1	4	1	16.7	1.17
(Hong Kong) (Taiwan) Lai Shiu Wing	1958–1967	43	16	6	21	37.2	1.26
(Hong Kong) (Taiwan) Fei Chun Wah (Note: Fei Chun Wah was appointed as the coach of Hong Kong during the team's Asian Cup Final journey and the journey in Europe and Singapore afterwards as the official coach Lai Shiu Wing was not allowed to leave from his working place.)	1964	5	0	1	4	0.0	0.20
(Hong Kong) (Taiwan) Chu Wing Keung	1967	2	0	0	2	0.0	0.00
(Hong Kong) (Taiwan) Tang Sum	1968	5	0	1	4	0.0	0.20
(Hong Kong) (Taiwan) Lau Tim	1968	5	0	3	2	0.0	0.60
(Hong Kong) (Taiwan) Hsu King Shing	1969–1970	3	0	1	2	0.0	0.33
(Hong Kong) (Taiwan) Chan Fai Hung	1970–1972	23	7	3	13	30.4	1.04
(Hong Kong) (Taiwan) Ho Ying Fun	1973–1975	23	9	6	8	39.1	1.43
(Netherlands) Frans van Balkom	1976–1977	21	7	2	12	33.3	1.10
(Malaysia) Chan Yong Chong	1978–1979	7	4	1	2	57.1	1.86
(Northern Ireland) Peter McParland	1980	4	1	0	3	25.0	0.75
(Netherlands) George Knobel	1980–1981	7	2	2	3	28.6	1.14
(Hong Kong) Kwok Ka Ming	1982–1990; 1997	47	16	11	20	34.0	1.26
(Hong Kong) Wong Man Wai	1991–1992	3	0	3	0	0.0	1.00
(Hong Kong) Chan Hung Ping	1993	10	2	2	6	20.0	0.80
(Malaysia) Koo Luam Khen	1994–1995	8	2	1	5	25.0	0.88
(Hong Kong) (Hong Kong) Tsang Wai Chung	1996; 2010–2011	38	11	8	19	28.9	1.08
(Brazil) Sebastian Araujo	1998–2000	6	0	1	5	0.0	0.17
(Netherlands) Arie van der Zouwen	2000–2002	13	3	2	8	23.1	0.85
(Brazil) Casemiro Mior	2002						
(Hong Kong) Lai Sun Cheung	2003–2006; 2007	45	15	9	21	33.3	1.20
(Hong Kong) Lee Kin Wo (Hong Kong) Chan Hiu Ming	2007	5	2	1	2	40.0	
(Serbia) Dejan Antonić (Croatia) Goran Paulić	2008–2009	4	2	0	2	50.0	1.50
(Hong Kong) Liu Chun Fai	2011–2012; 2018	8	4	2	2	50.0	1.75
(Australia) Ernie Merrick	2012	5	2	0	3	40.0	1.20
(South Korea) Kim Pan-gon	2009–2010; 2012–2017	58	21	13	24	36.2	1.31
(England) Gary White	2018	5	2	2	1	40.0	1.60
(Finland) Mixu Paatelainen	2019–2021	12	1	2	9	8.3	0.42
(Norway) Jørn Andersen	2021–2024	25	6	4	15	24.0	0.88
(Austria) Wolfgang Luisser	2024	4	1	2	1	25.0	1.25
(England) Ashley Westwood	2024–2025	20	10	4	6	50.0	1.70
(Hong Kong) Roberto Losada	2025–	6	4	0	2	66.7	2.00

Last updated: Hong Kong 3–0 Cambodia, 3 October 2026. Statistics include international "A" matches only.

== Players ==
=== Current squad ===
The following 23 players have been named in the final squad for the 2026 FIFA ASEAN Challenge Cup.

Caps and goals as of 3 October 2026 after the match against Cambodia.

No.	Pos.	Player	Date of birth (age)	Caps	Goals	Club
1	GK	Pong Cheuk Hei	31 January 2004 (age 22)	5	0	(Football Association of Hong Kong, China) Kitchee
18	GK	Tse Ka Wing	4 September 1999 (age 27)	11	0	(Football Association of Hong Kong, China) Tai Po
19	GK	Yip Ka Yu	24 December 1996 (age 29)	0	0	(Football Association of Hong Kong, China) Rangers
2	DF	Tsui Wang Kit	5 January 1997 (age 29)	31	1	(Chinese Football Association) Yunnan Yukun
3	DF	Oliver Gerbig	12 December 1998 (age 27)	33	0	(Chinese Football Association) Henan
4	DF	Vas Nuñez	22 November 1995 (age 30)	19	0	(Chinese Football Association) Yanbian Longding
5	DF	Dudu	17 April 1990 (age 36)	9	2	(Football Association of Hong Kong, China) Kitchee
13	DF	Kam Chi Kin	6 March 2004 (age 22)	5	0	(Football Association of Hong Kong, China) Kitchee
15	DF	Chan Yun Tung	7 July 2002 (age 24)	1	0	(Football Association of Hong Kong, China) Lee Man
17	DF	Callum Beattie	28 August 2001 (age 25)	3	0	(Football Association of Hong Kong, China) Kitchee
21	DF	Yue Tze Nam	12 May 1998 (age 28)	43	0	(Chinese Football Association) Beijing Guoan
6	MF	Tan Chun Lok	15 January 1996 (age 30)	64	3	(Football Association of Hong Kong, China) Kitchee
7	MF	Juninho	11 December 1990 (age 35)	29	5	(Football Association of Hong Kong, China) Kitchee
8	MF	Ngan Cheuk Pan	22 January 1998 (age 28)	28	0	(Chinese Football Association) Qingdao Hainiu
10	MF	Sohgo Ichikawa	30 July 2004 (age 22)	5	0	(Football Association of Hong Kong, China) Lee Man
12	MF	Wu Chun Ming	21 November 1997 (age 28)	28	0	(Football Association of Hong Kong, China) Lee Man
16	MF	Chan Siu Kwan	1 August 1992 (age 34)	37	8	(Football Association of Hong Kong, China) Tai Po
9	FW	Matt Orr	1 January 1997 (age 29)	51	16	(Chinese Football Association) Shanghai Port
11	FW	Everton Camargo	25 May 1991 (age 35)	29	14	(Football Association of Hong Kong, China) Kitchee
14	FW	Poon Pui Hin	3 October 2000 (age 26)	17	3	(Football Association of Hong Kong, China) Southern
20	FW	Ng Yu Hei	13 February 2006 (age 20)	10	1	(Chinese Football Association) Chongqing Tonglianglong
22	FW	Raphaël Merkies	15 April 2002 (age 24)	13	5	(Chinese Football Association) Shandong Taishan
23	FW	Sun Ming Him	19 June 2000 (age 26)	48	3	(Chinese Football Association) Tianjin Jinmen Tiger

=== Recent call-ups ===
The following players have been called up for the team within the previous 12 months.

Pos.	Player	Date of birth (age)	Caps	Goals	Club	Latest call-up
GK	Poon Sheung Hei	29 September 2006 (age 20)	0	0	(Hong Kong) HKFC	2026 FIFA ASEAN Challenge Cup ^{PRE}
GK	Tuscany Shek	25 December 2007 (age 18)	0	0	(Hong Kong) Kitchee	2026 FIFA ASEAN Challenge Cup ^{PRE}
DF	Shinichi Chan	5 September 2002 (age 24)	36	1	(China) Shanghai Shenhua	2026 FIFA ASEAN Challenge Cup ^{PRE}
DF	Leung Nok Hang	14 November 1994 (age 32)	14	0	(China) Shenzhen Juniors	2026 FIFA ASEAN Challenge Cup ^{PRE}
DF	Li Ngai Hoi	15 October 1994 (age 32)	12	0	(Hong Kong) Eastern District	2026 FIFA ASEAN Challenge Cup ^{PRE}
DF	Nicholas Benavides	5 November 2001 (age 25)	10	2	(China) Foshan Nanshi	2026 FIFA ASEAN Challenge Cup ^{PRE}
DF	Alexander Jojo	11 February 1999 (age 27)	8	0	(China) Chengdu Rongcheng	2026 FIFA ASEAN Challenge Cup ^{PRE}
DF	Jordan Lam	2 February 1999 (age 27)	3	0	(Hong Kong) Kitchee	2026 FIFA ASEAN Challenge Cup ^{PRE}
DF	Jay Haddow	2 April 2004 (age 22)	1	0	(Hong Kong) Kitchee	2026 FIFA ASEAN Challenge Cup ^{PRE}
DF	Leung Wai Fung	22 December 2000 (age 25)	0	0	(Hong Kong) Rangers	2026 FIFA ASEAN Challenge Cup ^{PRE}
DF	Tsang Yi Hang	27 October 2003 (age 23)	0	0	(Hong Kong) Lee Man	2026 FIFA ASEAN Challenge Cup ^{PRE}
DF	Remi Dujardin	23 June 1997 (age 29)	1	0	(China) Nantong Zhiyun	v. Cambodia, 9 June 2026
DF	Leon Jones	28 February 1998 (age 28)	20	1	Free agent	v. Mongolia & Cambodia, 5–9 June 2026 ^{PRE}
DF	Clément Benhaddouche	11 May 1996 (age 30)	2	0	(China) Changchun Yatai	v. Mongolia & Cambodia, 5–9 June 2026 ^{PRE}
DF	Cheng Tsz Sum	20 March 1999 (age 27)	0	0	(Hong Kong) Southern	v. Mongolia & Cambodia, 5–9 June 2026 ^{PRE}
DF	Loong Tsz Hin	8 August 2004 (age 22)	0	0	(Hong Kong) Eastern	v. Mongolia & Cambodia, 5–9 June 2026 ^{PRE}
DF	Yu Wai Lim	20 September 1998 (age 28)	9	0	(China) Meizhou Hakka	v. India, 31 March 2026 ^{PRE}
MF	Wong Wai	17 September 1992 (age 34)	63	7	(China) Nanjing City	2026 FIFA ASEAN Challenge Cup ^{PRE}
MF	Yu Joy Yin	8 October 2001 (age 25)	19	2	(Hong Kong) Lee Man	2026 FIFA ASEAN Challenge Cup ^{PRE}
MF	Lam Hin Ting	9 December 1999 (age 26)	5	0	(Hong Kong) Eastern	2026 FIFA ASEAN Challenge Cup ^{PRE}
MF	Barak Braunshtain	10 June 1999 (age 27)	1	0	(China) Qingdao West Coast	2026 FIFA ASEAN Challenge Cup ^{PRE}
MF	Wong Hin Sum	11 June 2002 (age 24)	0	0	(Hong Kong) Tai Po	2026 FIFA ASEAN Challenge Cup ^{PRE}
MF	Chin Yu Ho	13 February 2008 (age 18)	0	0	(Portugal) Oriental U19	2026 FIFA ASEAN Challenge Cup ^{PRE}
MF	Jing Yung Chun	3 December 2008 (age 17)	0	0	(Belgium) KRC Mechelen	2026 FIFA ASEAN Challenge Cup ^{PRE}
MF	Fernando	14 November 1986 (age 40)	25	1	(Hong Kong) Tai Po	v. India, 31 March 2026 ^{PRE}
FW	Michael Udebuluzor	1 April 2004 (age 22)	21	2	(Hong Kong) Lee Man	2026 FIFA ASEAN Challenge Cup ^{PRE}
FW	Chung Wai Keung	21 October 1995 (age 31)	9	1	(Hong Kong) Lee Man	2026 FIFA ASEAN Challenge Cup ^{PRE}
FW	Ma Hei Wai	3 February 2004 (age 22)	5	1	(China) Shaanxi Union	2026 FIFA ASEAN Challenge Cup ^{PRE}
FW	Manolo Bleda	31 July 1990 (age 36)	4	0	(Hong Kong) HKFC	2026 FIFA ASEAN Challenge Cup ^{PRE}
FW	Lau Chi Lok	15 October 1993 (age 33)	0	0	(Hong Kong) Rangers	2026 FIFA ASEAN Challenge Cup ^{PRE}
FW	Lee Lok Him	18 April 2004 (age 22)	0	0	(Hong Kong) Eastern	2026 FIFA ASEAN Challenge Cup ^{PRE}
FW	Joshua Baker	5 October 2009 (age 17)	0	0	(United States) Black Rock FC	2026 FIFA ASEAN Challenge Cup ^{PRE}
FW	Lau Ka Kiu	10 February 2002 (age 24)	7	0	Retired	v. Cambodia, 9 June 2026
^{PRE} Preliminary squad.^{INJ} Player withdrew from the squad due to an injury^{WD} Player withdrew from the squad.^{RET} Player retired from international football

== History of naturalised players ==
During the 1950s, Arthur Santos who is of British-Portuguese nationality (whose son Leslie was a former Hong Kong international footballer) became the first naturalised player to represent the Hong Kong national football team who was then followed by another fellow Portuguese-born player named JH Toleido.

In the 1960s, there were a couple more foreign players who had represented the Hong Kong national football team whilst some were working within the national service at the time. These include British players from T. Watson, Evans, Ken Wallis who went on to represent Hong Kong during the lawn bowls event during the 1990 and 1994 Commonwealth Games as well as Australian-born Pete McClaren and Scottish-born Charlie Wright.

In the late 1970s, Scottish-born players Derek Currie, Dave Anderson and Hugh McCrory all became eligible to represent the Hong Kong national football team in which Currie and Anderson took part during the 1979 Asian Cup qualifiers whilst McCrory took part during the 1982 World Cup qualifiers.

There were at least a couple more naturalised players who went on to represent Hong Kong throughout the 90's which include Bosnian-born Anto Grabo along with fellow English-born players Mark Grainger, John Moore and most notably Dale Tempest. Sung Lin Yung became the first mainland born player to represent Hong Kong during the 1998 World Cup Asian qualifiers having resided for more than two years under FIFA eligibility rules unlike foreign born players that would usually require at least seven years.

In the 2000s, a couple of African and Brazilian-born players were introduced went through the naturalisation process having met the residential criteria. Nigerian-born Lawrence Akandu obtained his Hong Kong citizenship in which he played for the national team during the 2003 East Asia Cup finals where he scored a goal in a loss against South Korea. He was soon followed by Cameroon-born Guy Gerard Ambassa who obtained his permanent residential status in 2005 along with another fellow Nigerian-born player named Colly Ezeh and Brazilian-born Cristiano Cordeiro in which both of whom earned international caps during the 2007 AFC Asian Cup qualifiers. Cordeiro was also the first non-Chinese captain in the history of the Hong Kong team during the 2008 East Asia Cup preliminary stages. Despite having played for the national team during the 2009 edition of the Guangdong-Hong Kong Cup, Cameroonian-born Julius Akosah attempted to apply for a HKSAR passport, however his application was unsuccessful.

During the mid 2010s, there had been an increase of naturalised players being used to represent the national team in which former head coach Kim Pan-gon stated that he needed to pick his best players regardless of their origin in preparation during the 2018 World Cup qualifiers.

These include the likes of European-born players Clement Benhaddouche, Manuel Bleda, Dani Cancela, Jaimes McKee, Raphaël Merkies, Fernando Recio, Andy Russell, Jack Sealy, Jordi Tarrés and Sean Tse, Brazilian-born players Everton Camargo, Paulo César, Clayton, Dudu, Diego Eli, Fernando, Giovane, Helio, Itaparica, Juninho, Roberto Júnior, Tomas Maronesi, Paulinho, Stefan Pereira, and Sandro, Asian-born players Jahangir Khan and Yuto Nakamura, and African-born players from Wisdom Fofo Agbo, Alex Akande, Christian Annan, Mahama Awal, Festus Baise, Godfred Karikari, Jean-Jacques Kilama, and Paul Ngue.

In addition to Sung Lin Yung, several other mainland born players went on to represent Hong Kong from past to present which include Bai He, Chao Pengfei, Deng Jinghuang, Feng Jizhi, Gao Wen, Li Haiqiang, Liu Quankun, Huang Yang, Ju Yingzhi, Wang Zhenpeng, Wei Zhao, Xiao Guoji, Xu Deshuai, Ye Jia, and Zhang Chunhui.

== Records ==
As of 3 October 2026
Players in bold are still active with Hong Kong.

=== Most appearances ===
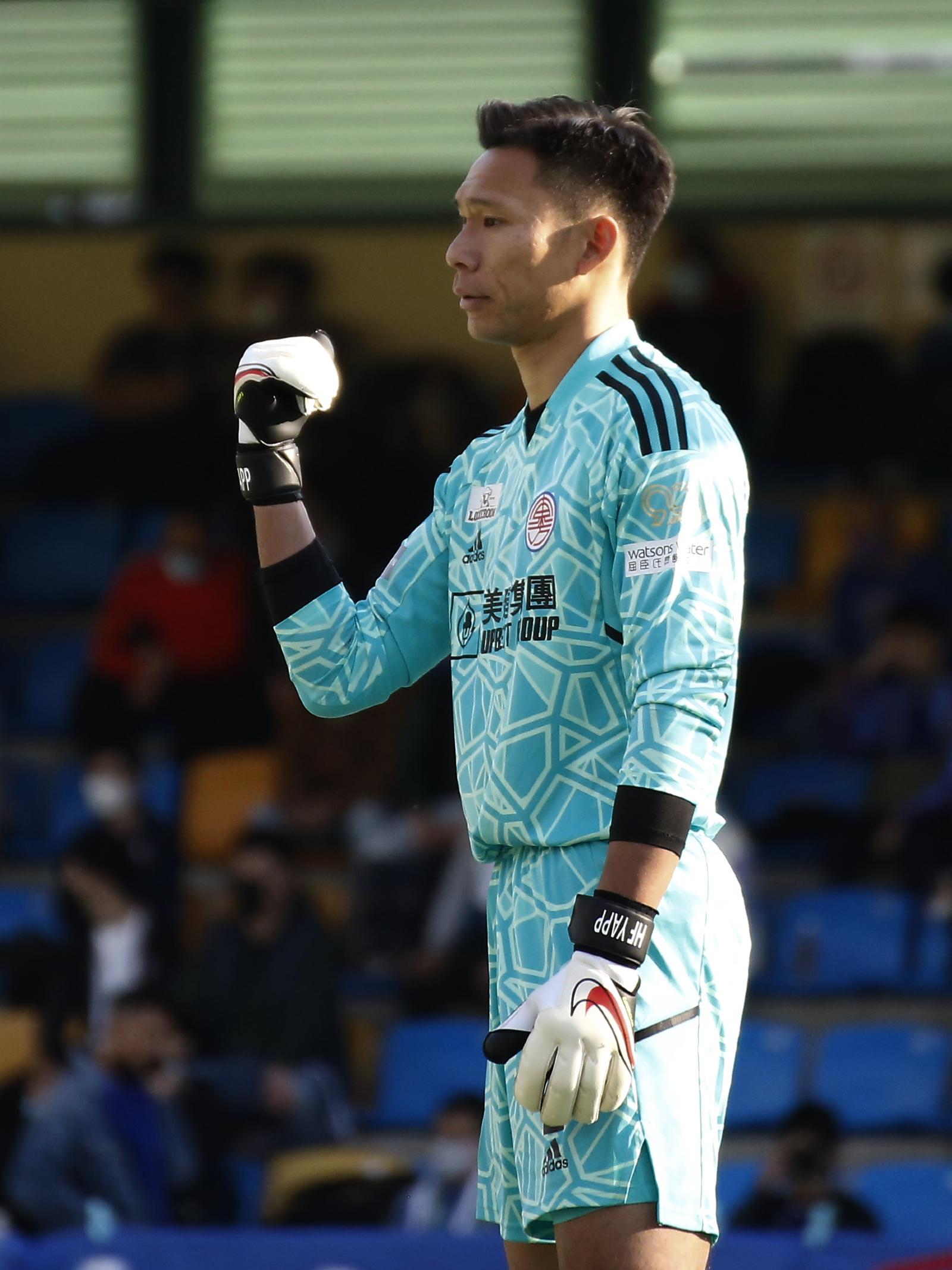
Yapp Hung Fai is Hong Kong's most capped player with 112 caps.

Rank	Player	Caps	Goals	Position	Career
1	**Yapp Hung Fai**	112	0	GK	2010–present
2	Huang Yang	71	1	MF	2012–2023
3	Chan Siu Ki	70	40	FW	2004–2017
3	Lee Chi Ho	70	0	DF	2000–2017
5	Lee Wai Man	68	2	DF	1993–2006
6	Chan Wai Ho	65	6	DF	2000–2017
7	**Tan Chun Lok**	64	3	MF	2015–present
8	**Wong Wai**	63	7	MF	2013–present
9	Poon Yiu Cheuk	62	4	DF	1998–2010
10	Tsang Ting Fai	57	0	DF	1972–1980

=== Top goalscorers ===
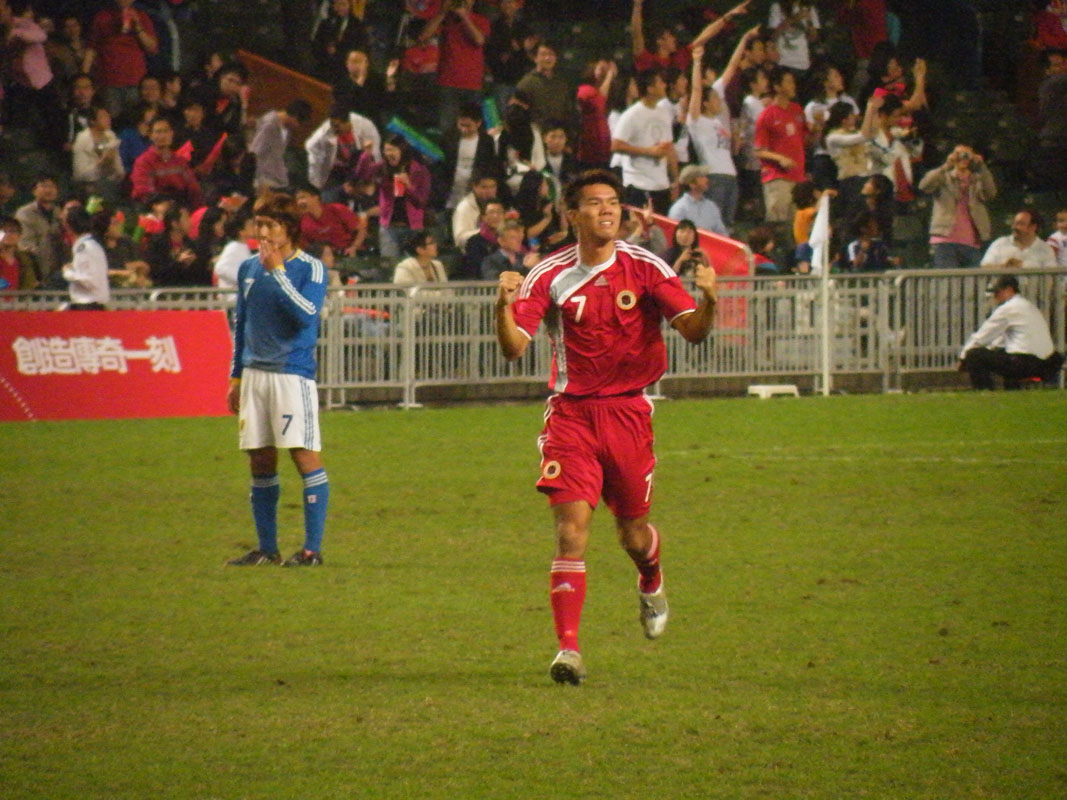
Chan Siu Ki is Hong Kong's top scorer with 40 goals.

Rank	Player	Goals	Caps	Ratio	Career
1	Chan Siu Ki	40	70	0.57	2004–2017
2	Au Wai Lun	26	50	0.52	1989–2005
3	Lau Wing Yip	24	39	0.62	1971–1986
4	Wan Chi Keung	18	32	0.56	1976–1986
5	Chung Chor Wai	16	45	0.36	1971–1979
5	**Matt Orr**	16	51	0.31	2021–present
7	**Everton Camargo**	14	29	0.48	2023–present
7	Ho Cheng Yau	14	34	0.41	1956–1968
7	Tim Bredbury	14	34	0.41	1986–1999
10	Li Kwok Keung	13	34	0.38	1964–1972

== Captains ==
This list only records the players who were named as Hong Kong captain in official international competitions. First-choice captains always go first.

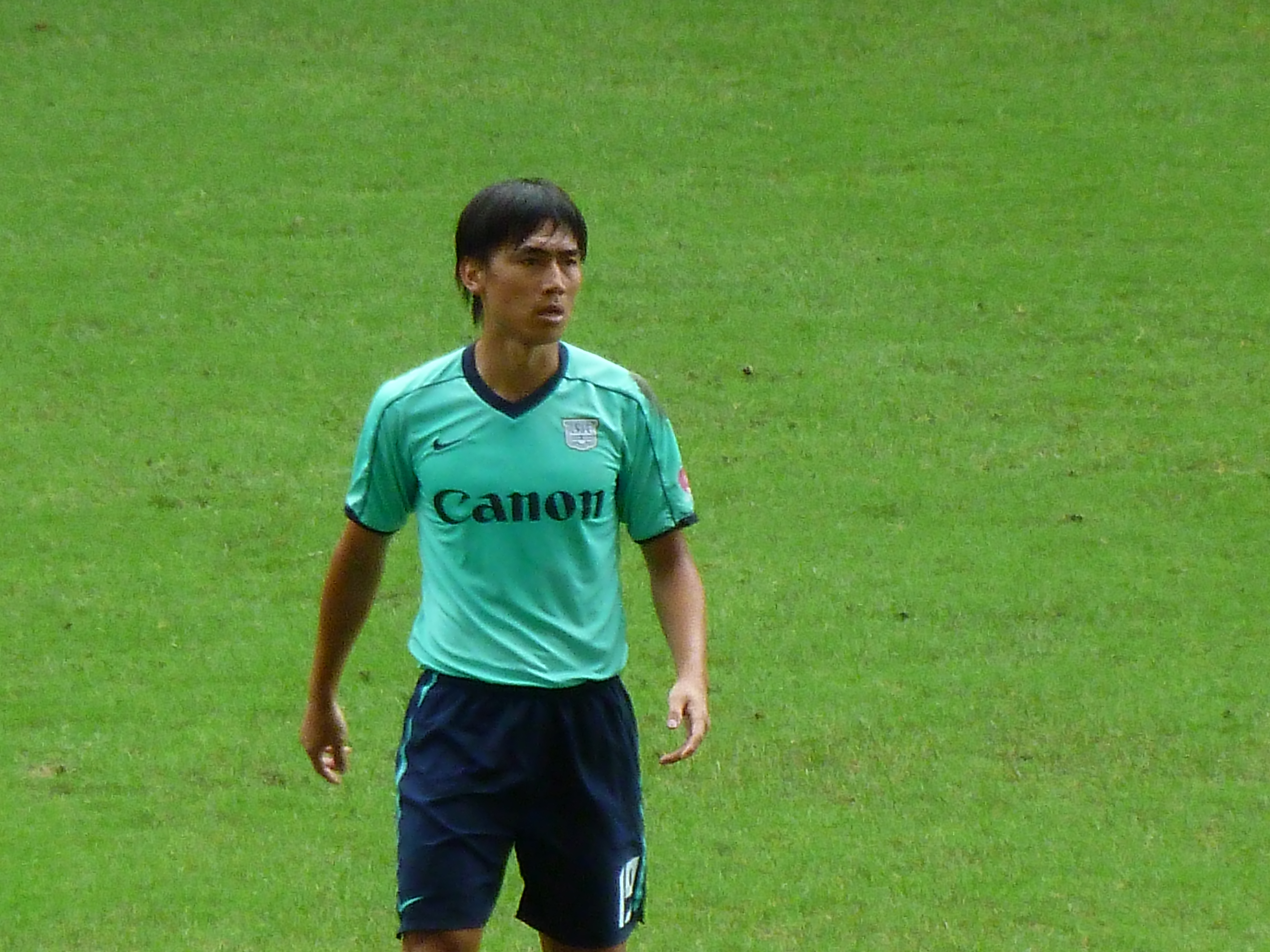
Huang Yang was the captain of Hong Kong from 2018 to 2023.

Year	Tournament	Captain(s)
1954	(Philippines) 1954 Asian Games	Ko Po Keung
1956	(Hong Kong) 1956 AFC Asian Cup	Ko Po Keung
1958	(Japan) 1958 Asian Games	Ho Cheung Yau
1964	(Israel) 1964 AFC Asian Cup	Cheung Wing Ching
1968	(Iran) 1968 AFC Asian Cup	Kung Wah Kit
1990	(China) 1990 Asian Games	Cheung Chi Tak
1994	(Japan) 1994 Asian Games	Lee Kin Wo
1998	(Thailand) 1998 Asian Games	Cheung Sai Ho
2003	(Japan) 2003 East Asian Football Championship	Lee Wai Man
2010	(Japan) 2010 East Asian Football Championship	Poon Yiu Cheuk, Chan Wai Ho, Au Yeung Yiu Chung, Li Haiqiang
2019	(South Korea) 2019 EAFF E-1 Football Championship	Huang Yang
2022	(Japan) 2022 EAFF E-1 Football Championship	Sean Tse
2024	(Qatar) 2023 AFC Asian Cup	Yapp Hung Fai, Vas Nuñez
2025	(South Korea) 2025 EAFF E-1 Football Championship	Yapp Hung Fai
2026	(Hong Kong) 2026 FIFA ASEAN Challenge Cup	Tan Chun Lok; Matt Orr

== Competitive record ==
See comprehensive article: Hong Kong national football team all-time record
Denotes draws includes knockout matches decided on penalty kicks.

=== FIFA World Cup ===
FIFA World Cup record									FIFA World Cup qualification record					
Year	Result	Position	Pld	W	D*	L	GF	GA	Pld	W	D	L	GF	GA
(Uruguay) 1930 to (Switzerland) 1954	Not a FIFA member								Not a FIFA member					
(Sweden) 1958 to (Mexico) 1970	Did not enter								Did not enter					
(West Germany) 1974	Did not qualify								4	3	0	1	4	3
(Argentina) 1978	Did not qualify								13	3	2	8	15	31
(Spain) 1982	Did not qualify								4	0	3	1	3	4
(Mexico) 1986	Did not qualify								8	5	1	2	20	7
(Italy) 1990	Did not qualify								6	0	3	3	5	10
(United States) 1994	Did not qualify								8	2	1	5	9	19
(France) 1998	Did not qualify								4	1	0	3	3	10
(South Korea) (Japan) 2002	Did not qualify								6	1	1	4	3	10
(Germany) 2006	Did not qualify								6	2	0	4	5	15
(South Africa) 2010	Did not qualify								4	2	1	1	11	6
(Brazil) 2014	Did not qualify								2	0	0	2	0	8
(Russia) 2018	Did not qualify								8	4	2	2	13	5
(Qatar) 2022	Did not qualify								8	1	2	5	4	13
(Canada) (Mexico) (United States) 2026	Did not qualify								8	1	2	5	8	17
(Morocco) (Portugal) (Spain) 2030	To be determined								To be determined					
(Saudi Arabia) 2034	To be determined								To be determined					
Total	—	0/18	–	–	–	–	–	–	89	25	18	46	103	158

=== AFC Asian Cup ===
AFC Asian Cup record									Qualification record					
Year	Result	Position	Pld	W	D*	L	GF	GA	Pld	W	D	L	GF	GA
(Hong Kong) 1956	Third place	3rd	3	0	2	1	6	7	Qualified as hosts					
(South Korea) 1960	Did not qualify								2	1	0	1	11	7
(Israel) 1964	Fourth place	4th	3	0	0	3	1	5	3	2	1	0	11	7
(Iran) 1968	Fifth place	5th	4	0	1	3	2	11	4	4	0	0	9	1
(Thailand) 1972	Did not qualify								3	0	0	3	3	6
(Iran) 1976	Did not qualify								5	1	2	2	6	5
(Kuwait) 1980	Did not qualify								6	3	1	2	10	6
(Singapore) 1984	Did not qualify								4	0	2	2	1	4
(Qatar) 1988	Did not qualify								4	0	1	3	0	5
(Japan) 1992	Did not qualify								3	0	3	0	2	2
(United Arab Emirates) 1996	Did not qualify								3	2	0	1	12	3
(Lebanon) 2000	Did not qualify								4	2	1	1	7	5
(China) 2004	Did not qualify								8	2	2	4	10	14
(Indonesia) (Malaysia) (Thailand) (Vietnam) 2007	Did not qualify								6	2	2	2	5	7
(Qatar) 2011	Did not qualify								6	0	1	5	1	18
(Australia) 2015	Did not qualify								6	1	1	4	2	13
(United Arab Emirates) 2019	Did not qualify								14	5	4	5	17	12
(Qatar) 2023	Group stage	23rd	3	0	0	3	1	7	11	3	2	6	9	18
(Saudi Arabia) 2027	Did not qualify								14	3	4	7	16	25
Total	Third place	4/19	13	0	3	10	10	30	106	31	27	48	132	158

AFC Asian Cup history
Year	Round	Score	Result
(Hong Kong) 1956	Finals	Hong Kong 2–3 Israel	Loss
(Hong Kong) 1956	Finals	Hong Kong 2–2 South Korea	Draw
(Hong Kong) 1956	Finals	Hong Kong 2–2 South Vietnam	Draw
(Israel) 1964	Finals	Hong Kong 0–1 Israel	Loss
(Israel) 1964	Finals	Hong Kong 0–1 South Korea	Loss
(Israel) 1964	Finals	Hong Kong 1–3 India	Loss
(Iran) 1968	Finals	Hong Kong 0–2 Iran	Loss
(Iran) 1968	Finals	Hong Kong 1–6 Israel	Loss
(Iran) 1968	Finals	Hong Kong 1–1 Taiwan	Draw
(Iran) 1968	Finals	Hong Kong 0–2 Burma	Loss
(Qatar) 2023	Group stage	Hong Kong 1–3 United Arab Emirates	Loss
(Qatar) 2023	Group stage	Hong Kong 0–1 Iran	Loss
(Qatar) 2023	Group stage	Hong Kong 0–3 Palestine	Loss

=== FIFA ASEAN Challenge Cup ===
FIFA ASEAN Challenge Cup record
Year	Result	Pld	W	D	L	GF	GA
(Hong Kong) 2026	Champions	3	3	0	0	8	0

FIFA ASEAN Challenge Cup
Year	Round	Score	Result
(Hong Kong) 2026	Group stage	Hong Kong 4–0 Laos	Win
(Hong Kong) 2026	Group stage	Hong Kong 2–0 Brunei	Win
(Hong Kong) 2026	Final	Hong Kong 2–0 Cambodia	Win

=== EAFF E-1 Football Championship ===
EAFF E-1 Football Championship record									EAFF E-1 Football Championship qualification record					
Year	Result	Position	Pld	W	D*	L	GF	GA	Pld	W	D	L	GF	GA
(Japan) 2003	Fourth place	4	3	0	0	3	2	7	4	4	0	0	26	0
(South Korea) 2005	Did not qualify								4	3	0	1	26	2
(China) 2008	Did not qualify								3	1	1	1	16	3
(Japan) 2010	Fourth place	4	3	0	0	3	0	10	3	2	1	0	16	0
(South Korea) 2013	Did not qualify								4	2	0	2	4	6
(China) 2015	Did not qualify								3	1	1	1	2	2
(Japan) 2017	Did not qualify								3	2	0	1	7	5
(South Korea) 2019	Fourth place	4	3	0	0	3	0	9	3	2	1	0	7	2
(Japan) 2022	Fourth place	4	3	0	0	3	0	10	Qualified via FIFA Ranking					
(South Korea) 2025	Fourth place	4	3	0	0	3	1	9	3	3	0	0	10	1
Total	5/10	Fourth place	15	0	0	15	3	45	30	20	4	6	114	21

EAFF E-1 Football Championship history
Year	Round	Score	Result
(Japan) 2003	Finals	Hong Kong 1–3 South Korea	Loss
(Japan) 2003	Finals	Hong Kong 0–1 Japan	Loss
(Japan) 2003	Finals	Hong Kong 1–3 China	Loss
(Japan) 2010	Finals	Hong Kong 0–5 South Korea	Loss
(Japan) 2010	Finals	Hong Kong 0–3 Japan	Loss
(Japan) 2010	Finals	Hong Kong 0–2 China	Loss
(South Korea) 2019	Finals	Hong Kong 0–2 South Korea	Loss
(South Korea) 2019	Finals	Hong Kong 0–5 Japan	Loss
(South Korea) 2019	Finals	Hong Kong 0–2 China	Loss
(Japan) 2022	Finals	Hong Kong 0–6 Japan	Loss
(Japan) 2022	Finals	Hong Kong 0–3 South Korea	Loss
(Japan) 2022	Finals	Hong Kong 0–1 China	Loss
(South Korea) 2025	Finals	Hong Kong 1–6 Japan	Loss
(South Korea) 2025	Finals	Hong Kong 0–2 South Korea	Loss
(South Korea) 2025	Finals	Hong Kong 0–1 China	Loss

=== Asian Games ===
Asian Games record
Year	Result	Position	Pld	W	D*	L	GF	GA
(India) 1951	Did not enter							
(Philippines) 1954	First round	5	2	1	1	0	7	5
(Japan) 1958	Quarter-finals	7	3	2	0	1	8	6
(Indonesia) 1962 to (South Korea) 1986	Did not enter							
(China) 1990	First round	9	3	1	0	2	3	4
(Japan) 1994	First round	12	4	1	0	3	6	8
(Thailand) 1998	First round	22	2	0	0	2	0	11
(South Korea) 2002 to present	See Hong Kong national U-23 team							
Total†	Quarter-finals		14	5	1	8	24	34

† Excluding 1998 onwards

Asian Games history
Year	Round	Score	Result
(Philippines) 1954	First round	Hong Kong 3–3 South Korea	Draw
(Philippines) 1954	First round	Hong Kong 4–2 Afghanistan	Win
(Japan) 1958	First round	Hong Kong 4–1 Philippines	Win
(Japan) 1958	First round	Hong Kong 2–0 Japan	Win
(Japan) 1958	Quarter-finals	Hong Kong 2–5 India	Loss
(China) 1990	First round	Hong Kong 1–2 Kuwait	Loss
(China) 1990	First round	Hong Kong 0–2 Thailand	Loss
(China) 1990	First round	Hong Kong 2–0 Yemen	Win
(Japan) 1994	First round	Hong Kong 3–4 Malaysia	Loss
(Japan) 1994	First round	Hong Kong 2–1 Thailand	Win
(Japan) 1994	First round	Hong Kong 0–1 Uzbekistan	Loss
(Japan) 1994	First round	Hong Kong 1–2 Saudi Arabia	Loss
(Thailand) 1998	First round	Hong Kong 0–6 Oman	Loss
(Thailand) 1998	First round	Hong Kong 0–5 Thailand	Loss

=== Friendly tournaments ===
Friendly tournaments
Competition	Result	Position	Pld	W	D*	L	GF	GA
(Malaysia) 1965 Merdeka Tournament	Seventh place	7	6	2	2	2	11	9
(Malaysia) 1966 Merdeka Tournament	First round	9	5	0	1	4	2	8
(Malaysia) 1967 Merdeka Tournament	Sixth place	6	6	2	0	4	6	18
(Malaysia) 1970 Merdeka Tournament	Fourth place	4	7	3	1	3	10	14
(Malaysia) 1971 Merdeka Tournament	Eighth place	8	6	2	0	4	6	14
(Malaysia) 1972 Merdeka Tournament	Sixth place	6	6	2	2	2	8	8
(Malaysia) 1974 Merdeka Tournament	Third place	3	4	1	3	1	5	5
(Malaysia) 1975 Merdeka Tournament	Fifth place	5	7	3	0	4	17	13
(China) 1977 Beijing Invited Tournament	Runners-up	2	3	2	0	1	8	2
(China) 1983 Great Wall Cup	Eighth place	8	4	1	2	1	4	4
(Hong Kong) 1995 Dynasty Cup	Third place	3	4	0	2	2	3	7
(Japan) 1998 Dynasty Cup	Fourth place	4	3	0	0	3	1	7
(Hong Kong) 2006 Carlsberg Cup	Fourth place	4	2	0	0	2	0	7
(Chinese Taipei) 2011 Long Teng Cup	Winners	1	3	2	1	0	14	4
(Myanmar) 2016 AYA Bank Cup	Fourth place	4	2	0	1	1	2	5
(Fiji) 2024 Tri-Nations Series	Winners	1	2	1	1	0	4	1
(Thailand) 2025 King's Cup	Third Place	3	2	1	0	1	9	1
Total	2 Titles							

== Honours ==
=== Continental ===
- AFC Asian Cup
  - (bronze) Third place (1): 1956

=== Regional ===
- FIFA ASEAN Challenge Cup
  - (gold) Champions (1): 2026

=== Friendly ===
- Long Teng Cup:
  - (gold) Champions (2): 2010, 2011
- Tri-Nations Series
  - (gold) Champions (1): 2025
- King's Cup
  - (bronze) Third place (1): 2025

=== Awards ===
- EAFF Championship Fair Play Award (1): 2010

=== Summary ===
Only official honours are included, according to FIFA statutes (competitions organized/recognized by FIFA or an affiliated confederation).

Competition	1st place, gold medalist(s)	2nd place, silver medalist(s)	3rd place, bronze medalist(s)	Total
AFC Asian Cup	0	0	1	1
FIFA ASEAN Challenge Cup	1	0	0	1
Total	1	0	1	2

== See also ==
- Sport in Hong Kong
  - Football in Hong Kong
- Hong Kong women's national football team
