= Song Lingsheng =

Chinese footballer

Personal information
- Date of birth: 1915

International career
Years	Team	Apps	(Gls)
- China

Song Lingsheng (born 1915, date of death unknown) was a Chinese footballer. He competed in the men's tournament at the 1948 Summer Olympics.
