= Jean Becker (footballer) =

Luxembourgish footballer (1922–2009)

Personal information
- Date of birth: 15 June 1922
- Date of death: 1 November 2009 (aged 87)
- Position: Midfielder

International career
Years	Team	Apps	(Gls)
1948–1950	Luxembourg	9	(1)

Jean Becker (15 June 1922 – 1 November 2009) was a Luxembourgish footballer. He played in nine matches for the Luxembourg national football team from 1948 to 1950. He was also part of Luxembourg's squad for the football tournament at the 1948 Summer Olympics, but he did not play in any matches.
