= Hau Yung Sang =

Chinese footballer (born 1917)

- Born: 1917; British Hong Kong
- Other name: Flash Harry
- Occupation: association footballer
Association football career
- Position: Defender
Senior career*
Years	Team	Apps	(Gls)
- Singtao
- South China
- Kitchee
- Eastern
International career
- China
- Republic of China (Taiwan)
Medal record
Men's football
Representing Taiwan
Asian Games
Gold medal – first place	1954 Manila
- * Club domestic league appearances and goals

Chinese name
- Traditional Chinese: 侯榕生
- Simplified Chinese: 侯榕生
Transcriptions
Standard Mandarin
- Hanyu Pinyin: Hóu Róngshēng
Yue: Cantonese
- Jyutping: Hau^{4} Jung^{4} Saang^{1}

Hau Yung Sang (born 1917, date of death unknown) was a professional footballer who represented the Republic of China in 1948 Olympics and Republic of China (Taiwan) in 1954 Asian Games. He was nicknamed Flash Harry.

== Honours ==
Republic of China

- Asian Games: Gold medal, 1954
