= List of Serie A hat-tricks =

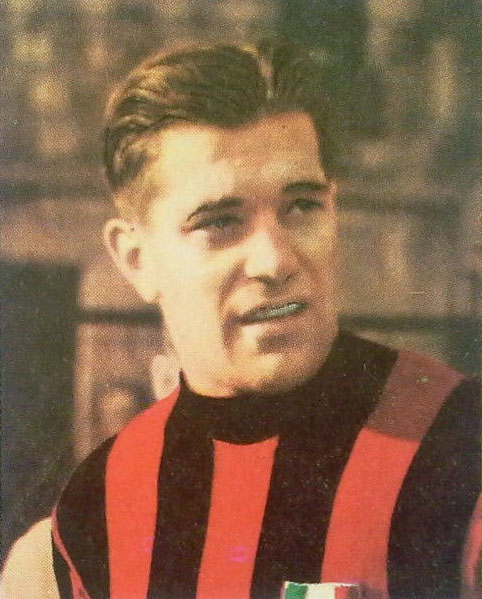
Gunnar Nordahl scored a record seventeen Serie A hat-tricks, all of them for Milan.

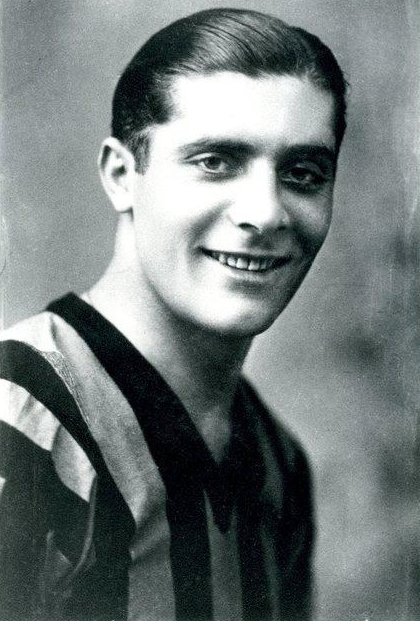
Giuseppe Meazza scored fifteen Serie A hat-tricks, all of them for Internazionale.

Since the inception of the Italian football league competition, the Serie A, (Note: Serie A was established in 1929, the successor of Divisione Nazionale, Prima Divisione and Prima Categoria) in 1929, more than 250 players have scored three goals (a hat-trick) or more in a single match. Swedish striker Gunnar Nordahl holds the record for most Serie A hat-tricks, having scored seventeen from 1949 to 1955. He scored all his hat-tricks while representing Milan, making him the player with most hat-tricks for a single club. He is followed by Italian striker Giuseppe Meazza who scored fifteen hat-tricks, all of them with Internazionale. Kurt Hamrin and István Nyers are in third place, with twelve hat-tricks each.

Over fifty players have scored more than three goals in a single match; of these, eleven players, Carlo Galli, Kurt Hamrin, Miroslav Klose, Roberto Pruzzo, Bruno Ispiro, István Mike Mayer, Antonio Angelillo, Giuseppe Meazza, Cesare Fasanelli, Emanuele Del Vecchio and Giovanni Vecchina have scored five. Silvio Piola and Omar Sívori have scored the most goals in a single match at six goals each. Gunnar Nordahl, Giuseppe Meazza and Kurt Hamrin have scored four or more goals three times in Serie A, more than any other player.

Serie A all-time top goalscorer Silvio Piola holds the record as the youngest player to score a hat-trick (17 years and 132 days), and the youngest to score more than three goals in one match (18 years and 54 days). Rodrigo Palacio is the oldest player to score a hat-trick (39 years and 86 days).

== Hat-tricks ==
Key
^{4}	Player scored four goals
^{5}	Player scored five goals
^{6}	Player scored six goals
†	Player scored hat-trick as a substitute
*	The home team

Note: The results column shows the goalscorer's team score first

István Nyers, also known as "Stefano Nyers", scored twelve hat-tricks, including eleven for Internazionale.

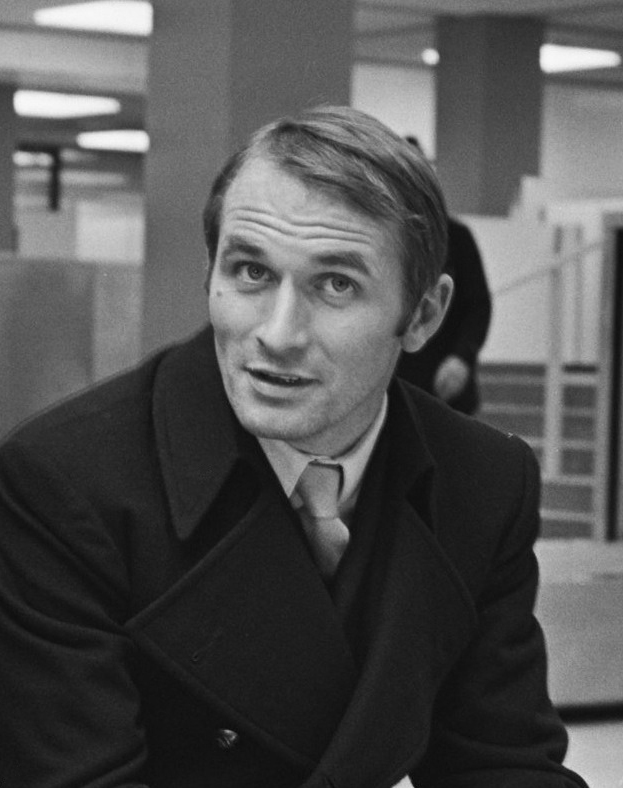
Kurt Hamrin scored twelve hat-tricks, including nine for Fiorentina.

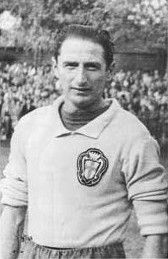
Silvio Piola, the Serie A all-time top goalscorer, recorded ten hat-tricks.

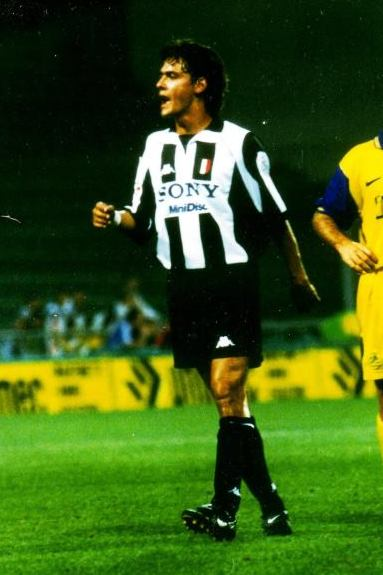
Italy international Filippo Inzaghi scored ten hat-tricks with three different clubs.

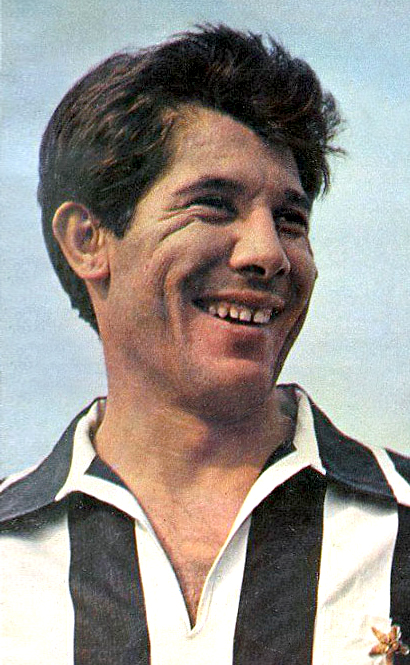
Omar Sívori scored nine hat-tricks.

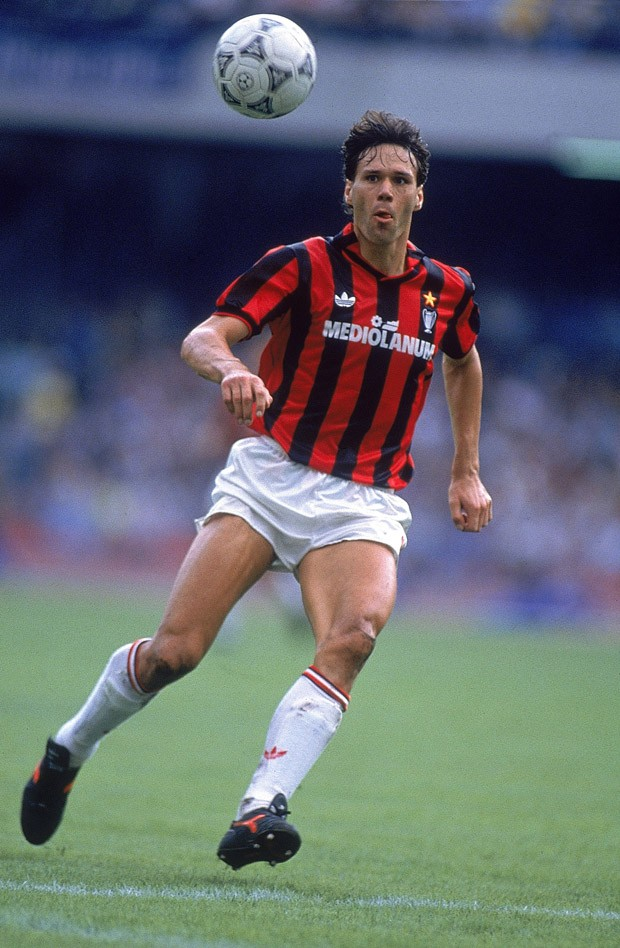
Marco van Basten scored eight hat-tricks in eight years in Serie A.

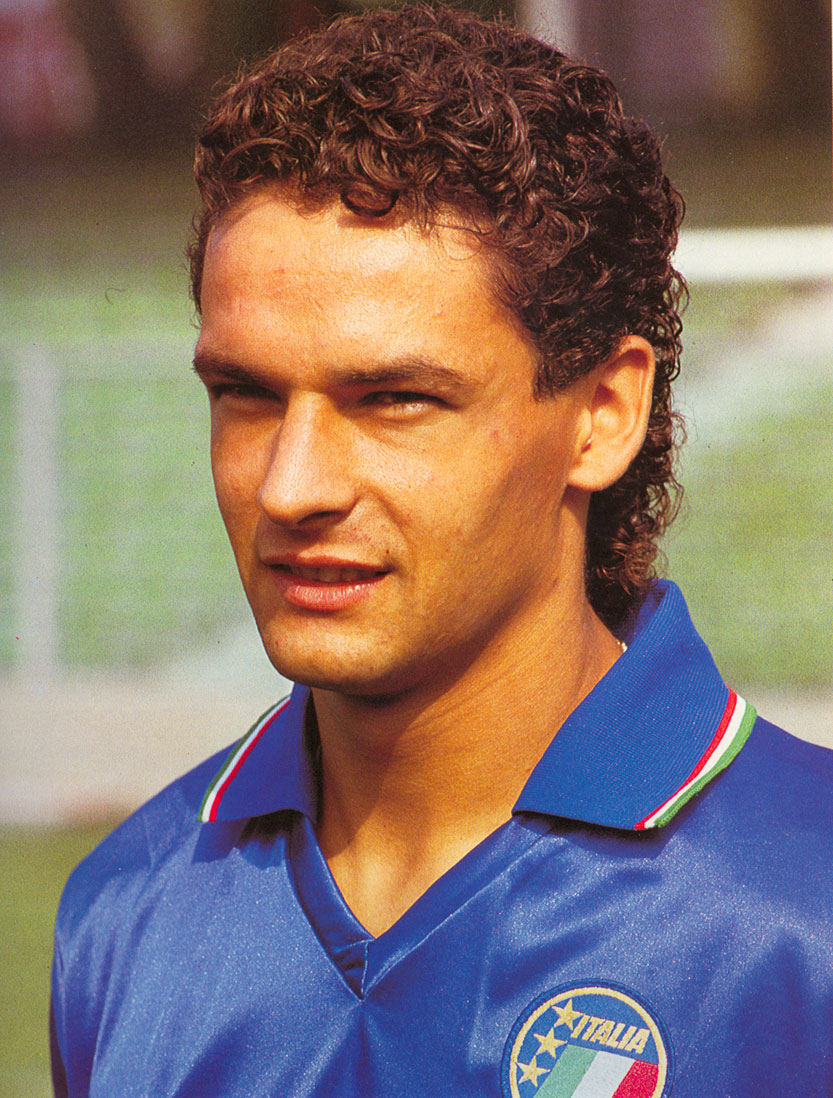
Roberto Baggio scored eight hat-tricks with four different clubs.

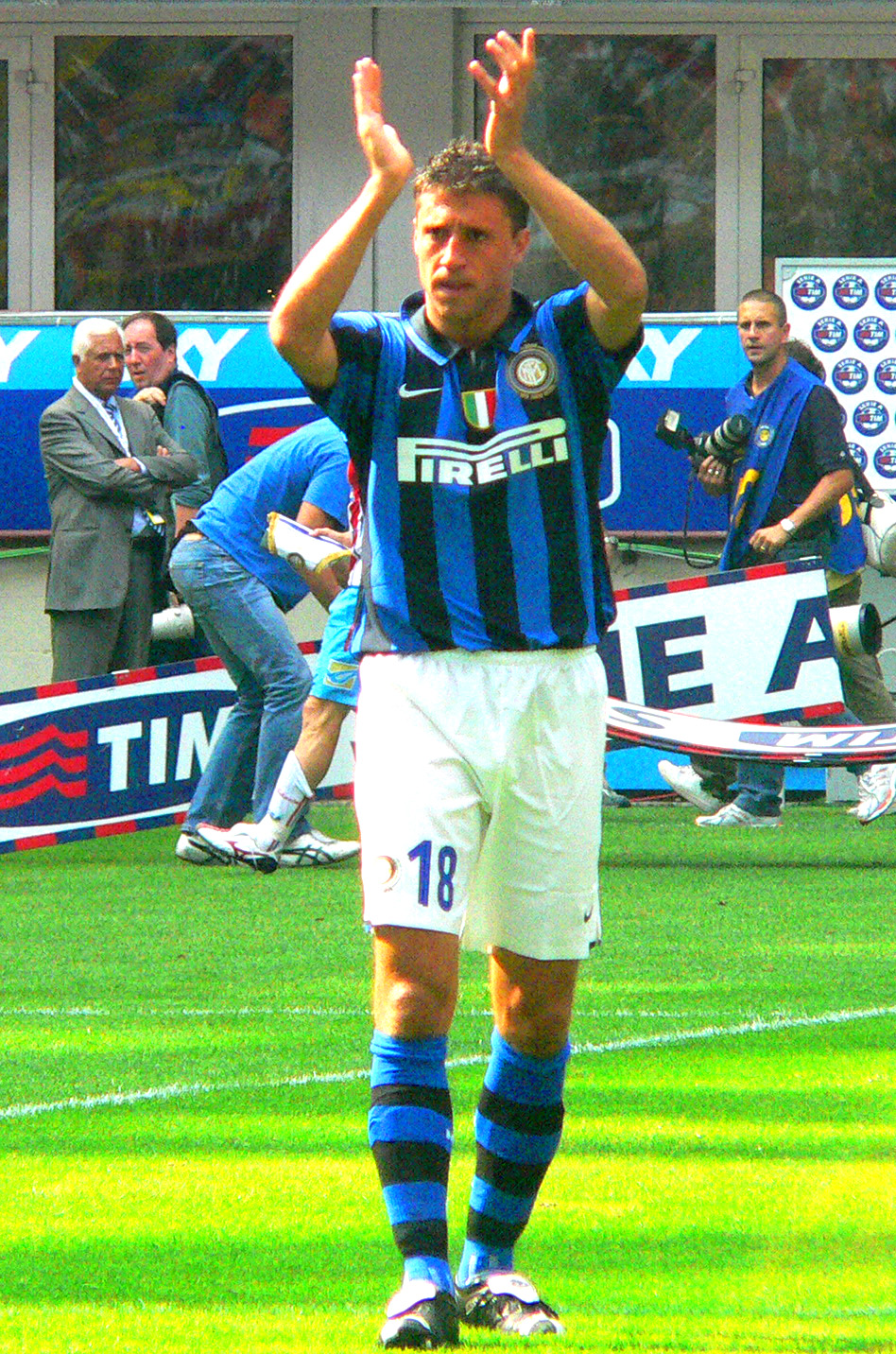
Hernán Crespo scored eight hat-tricks for four different clubs.

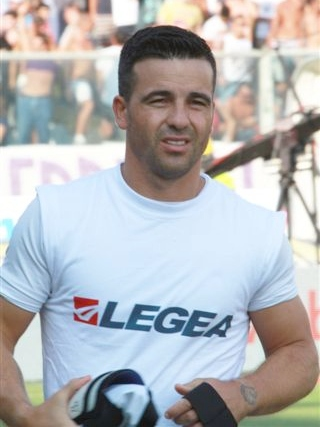
Antonio Di Natale scored the last of his seven hat-tricks in May 2014.

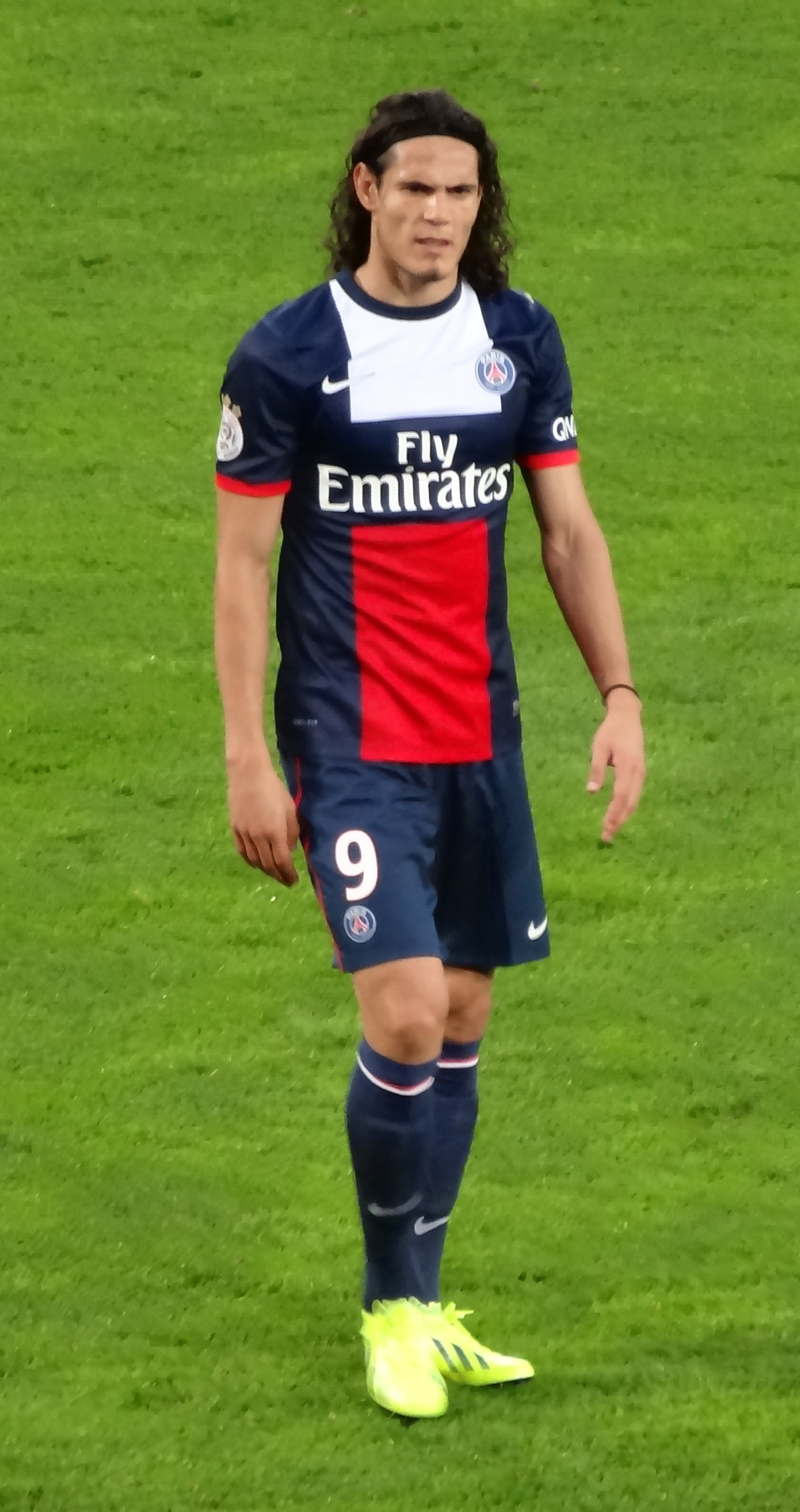
Edinson Cavani scored seven hat-tricks, all of them for Napoli.

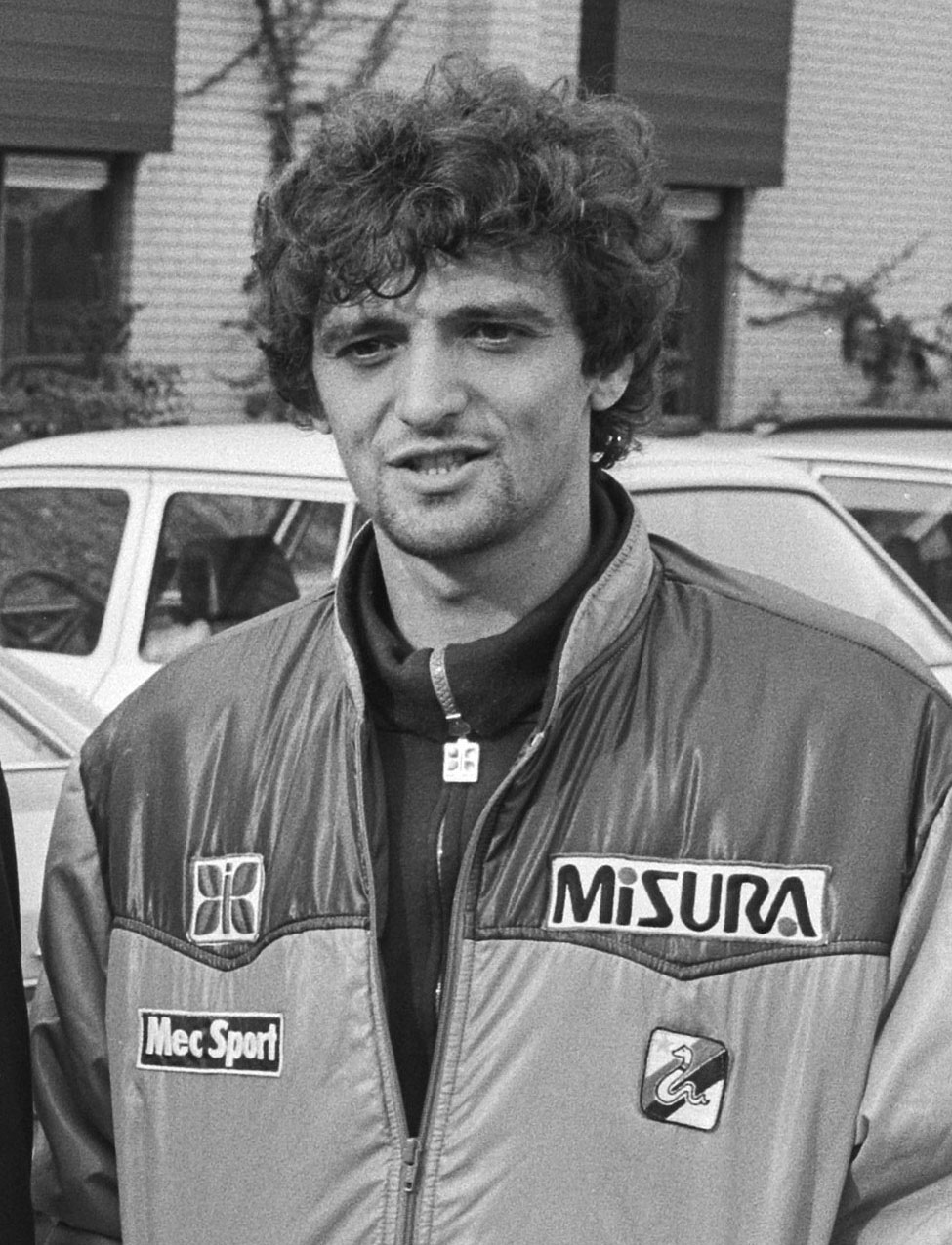
Alessandro Altobelli scored five hat-tricks in 350 Serie A appearances.

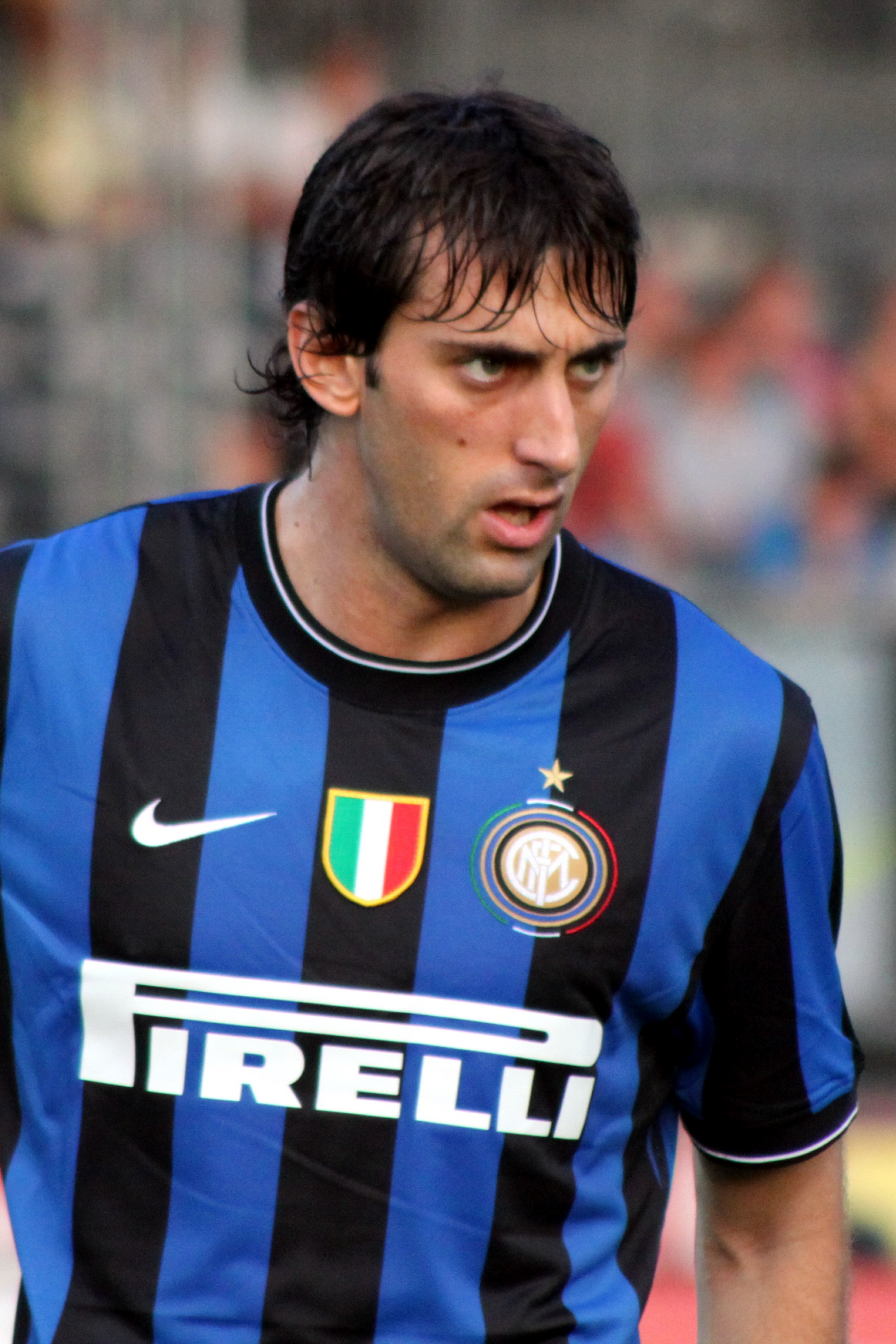
Diego Milito scored five hat-tricks, three for Inter and two for Genoa.

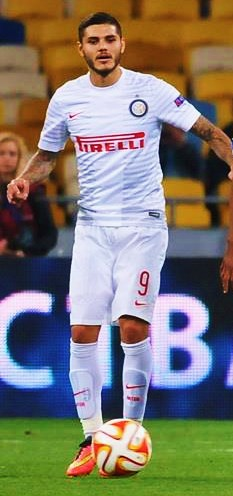
Argentine striker Mauro Icardi scored five hat-tricks, the first one being in 2013.

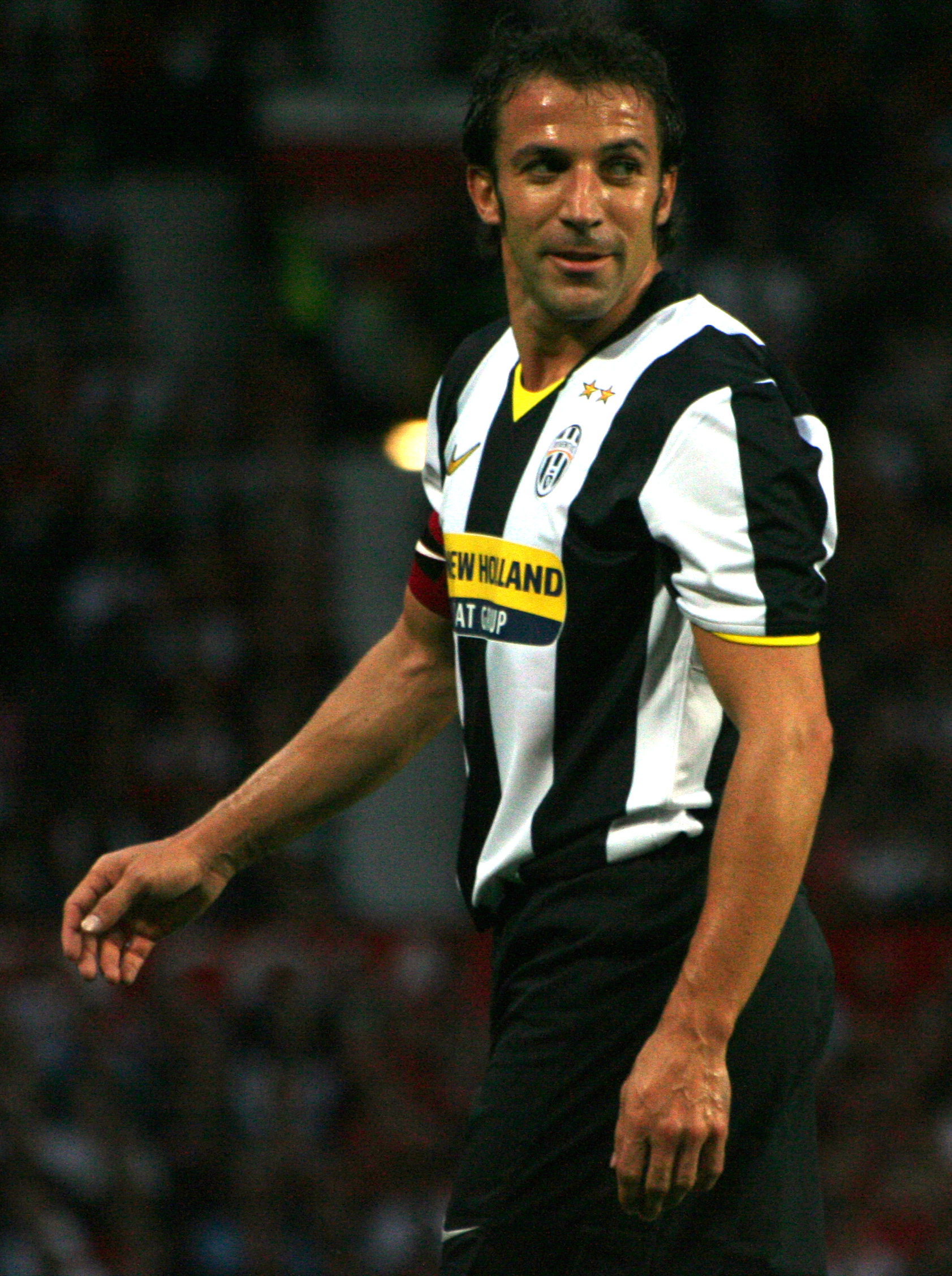
Alessandro Del Piero scored the first of his four Serie A hat-trick aged 18.

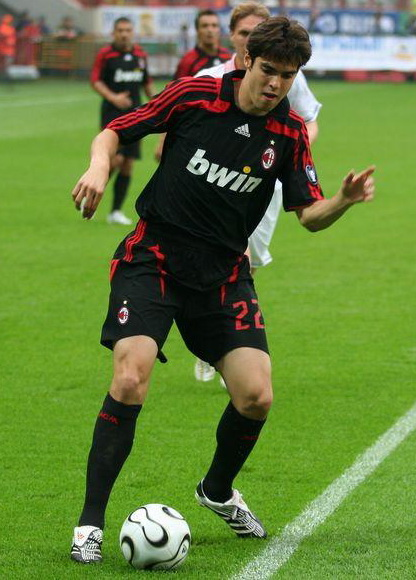
2007 Ballon d'Or winner Kaká bagged two hat-tricks in seven Serie A seasons.

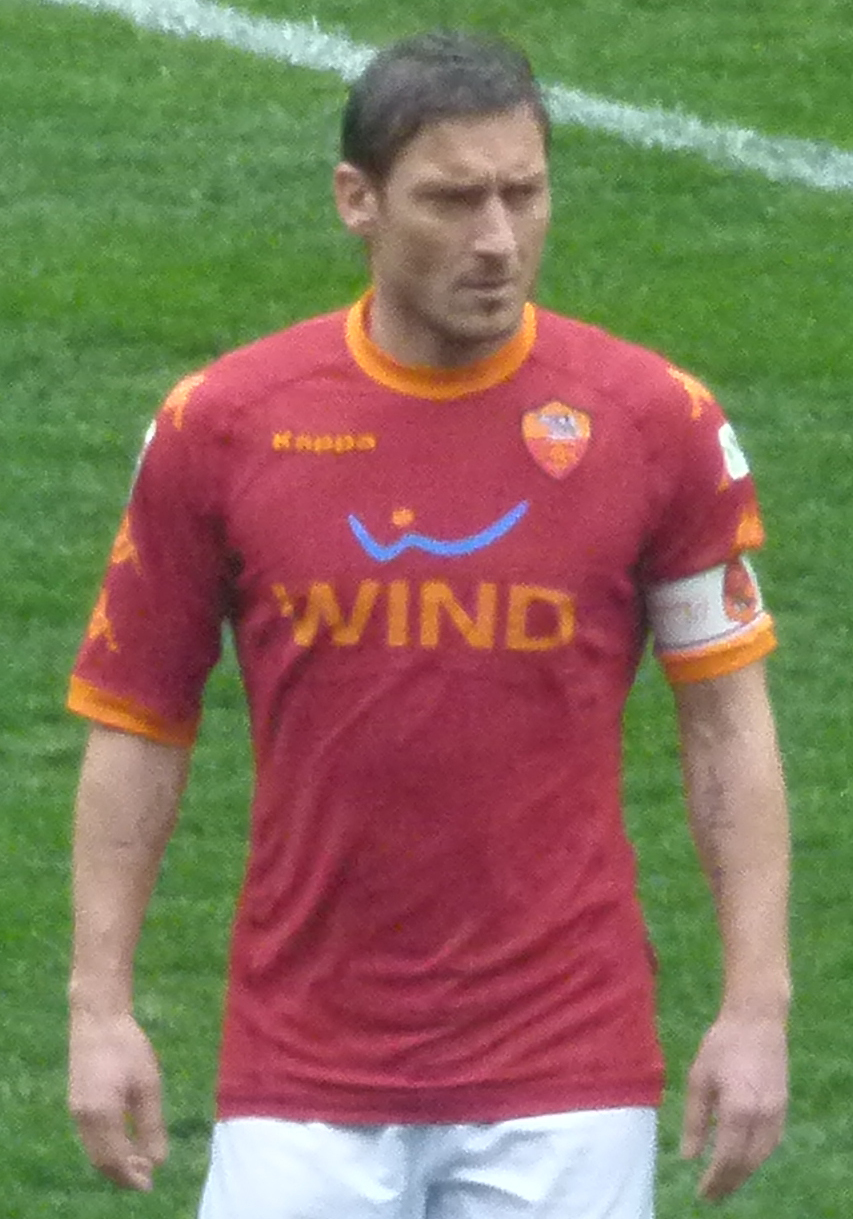
Er Bimbo de Oro Francesco Totti scored two hat-tricks across 25 seasons in Rome.

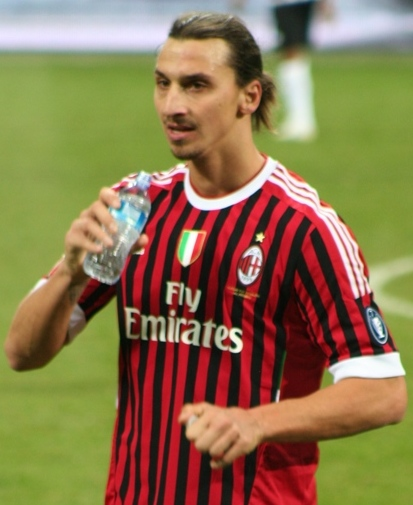
Zlatan Ibrahimović scored two hat-tricks, one for Juventus and one for Milan.

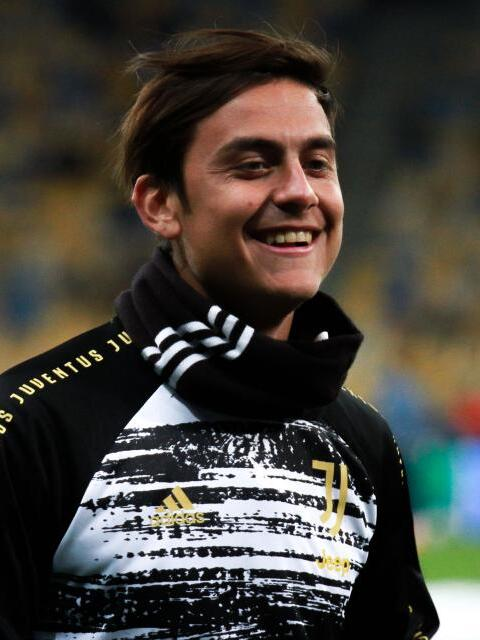
Juventus' Paulo Dybala scored a hat-trick in two consecutive weeks.

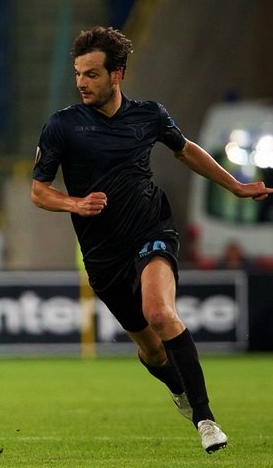
Marco Parolo is the only midfielder to score four Serie A goals in one match.

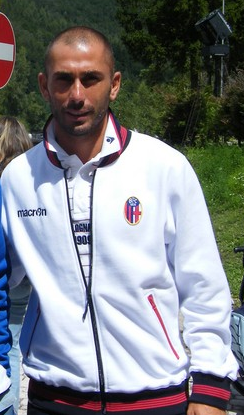
Marco Di Vaio scored six hat-tricks in twelve Serie A seasons.

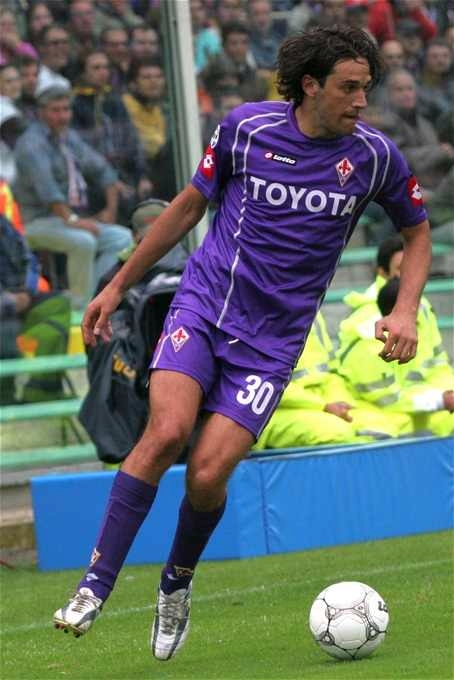
Two-time Capocannoniere winner Luca Toni scored two hat-tricks.

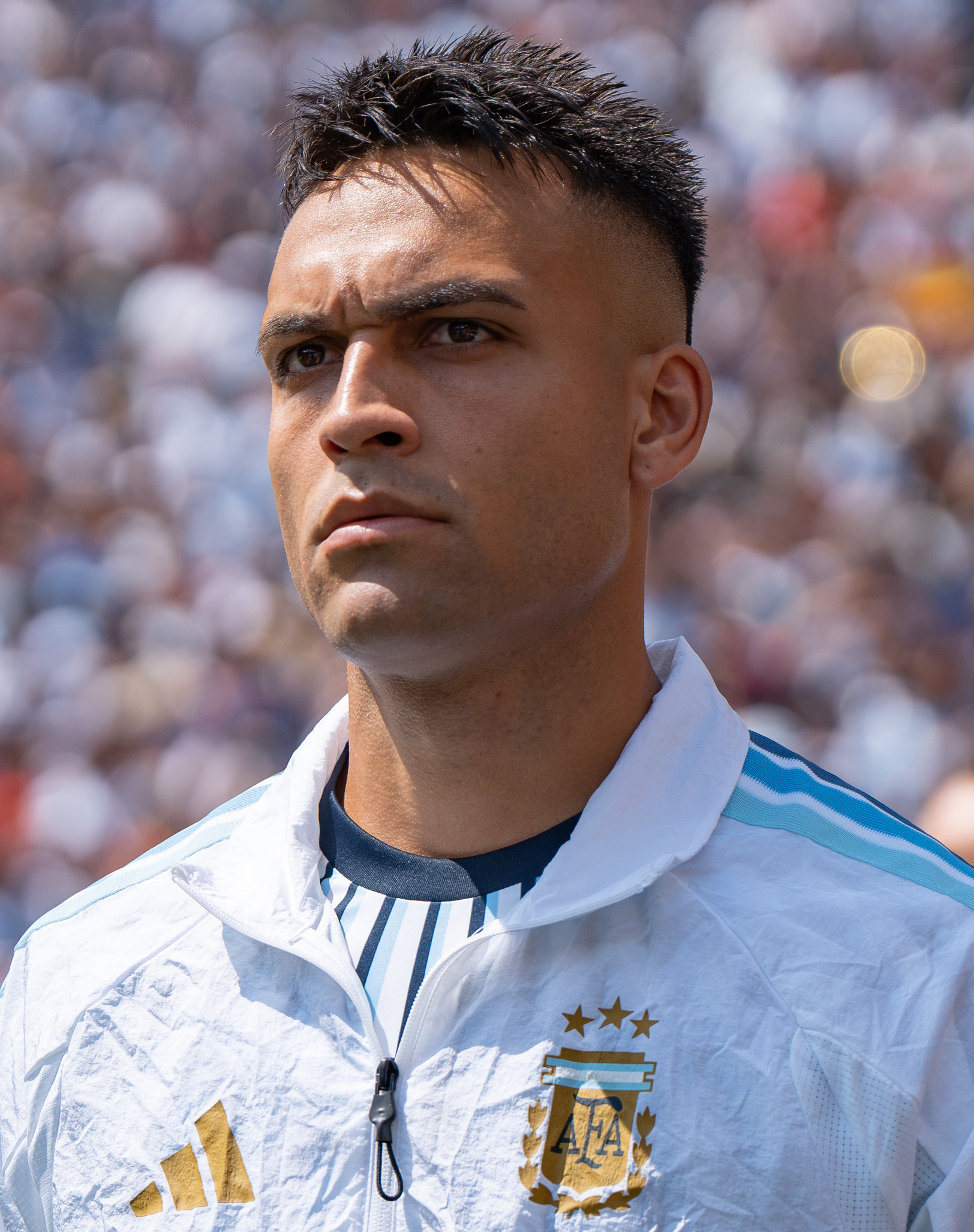
Lautaro Martínez is the only player to score four Serie A goals in one match as a substitute.

Player	Nationality	For	Against	Result	Date	Ref.
Luigi Ossoinach	Italy	Roma*	Cremonese	9–0	13 October 1929	
Rodolfo Volk	Italy	Roma*	Cremonese	9–0	13 October 1929	
Federico Munerati^{4}	Italy	Juventus*	Pro Vercelli	6–1	6 November 1929	
Luigi Ziroli	Italy	Lazio*	Cremonese	6–0	17 November 1929	
Giuseppe Meazza	Italy	Internazionale*	Padova	6–1	17 November 1929	
Luigi Ziroli	Italy	Lazio*	Padova	4–0	22 December 1929	
Gino Rossetti	Italy	Lazio*	Pro Vercelli	5–1	5 January 1930	
Giuseppe Meazza	Italy	Internazionale*	Lazio	4–2	23 March 1930	
Giovanni Vecchina^{5}	Italy	Padova*	Pro Patria	7–0	30 March 1930	
Rodolfo Volk	Italy	Roma*	Pro Vercelli	7–0	20 April 1930	
Giuseppe Meazza^{4}	Italy	Internazionale*	Roma	4–2	27 April 1930	
Rocco Ranelli^{4}	Italy	Milan*	Padova	4–2	29 May 1930	
Giuseppe Meazza	Italy	Internazionale*	Genoa	3–3	15 June 1930	
Rodolfo Volk	Italy	Roma*	Padova	8–0	6 July 1930	
Carlo Reguzzoni	Italy	Bologna	Livorno	5–0	5 October 1930	
Filippo Prato	Italy	Torino*	Internazionale	6–0	19 October 1930	
Giovanni Rebolino	Italy	Triestina*	Internazionale	5–0	2 November 1930	
Guillermo Stábile	Argentina	Genoa*	Bologna	3–1	16 November 1930	
Giovanni Faccenda	Italy	Livorno*	Casale	5–0	14 December 1930	
Angelo Schiavio	Italy	Bologna*	Brescia	7–1	21 December 1930	
Pietro Arcari	Italy	Milan*	Livorno	5–0	8 February 1931	
Silvio Piola	Italy	Pro Vercelli*	Napoli	6–3	8 February 1931	
Giovanni Vecchina	Italy	Juventus*	Pro Vercelli	5–1	8 March 1931	
Ettore Banchero	Italy	Alessandria*	Legnano	5–0	22 March 1931	
Cinzio Scagliotti	Italy	Alessandria*	Triestina	4–1	3 May 1931	
Cesare Fasanelli^{5}	Italy	Roma	Livorno*	7–1	3 May 1931	
Carlo Reguzzoni	Italy	Bologna*	Juventus	4–0	24 May 1931	
Giovanni Braga	Italy	Brescia	Triestina*	4–0	24 May 1931	
Raffaele Costantino	Italy	Roma*	Torino	5–1	7 June 1931	
Carlo Reguzzoni	Italy	Bologna	Alessandria*	6–1	14 June 1931	
Antonio Busini	Italy	Bologna	Casale*	6–1	21 June 1931	
Silvio Piola^{4}	Italy	Pro Vercelli	Alessandria*	4–5	22 November 1931	
Giuseppe Meazza	Italy	Internazionale*	Casale	4–0	31 January 1932	
Giuseppe Meazza	Italy	Internazionale*	Pro Patria	6–2	18 September 1932	
Alfredo Mazzoni	Italy	Genoa*	Triestina	4–0	18 September 1932	
Gino Rossetti^{4}	Italy	Torino*	Casale	9–0	6 November 1932	
Angelo Schiavio	Italy	Bologna	Casale*	4–3	11 December 1932	
Angelo Schiavio^{4}	Italy	Bologna*	Pro Patria	6–1	22 January 1933	
Giovanni Busoni	Italy	Torino*	Bari	6–2	12 March 1933	
Mario Dalfini	Italy	Pro Patria*	Casale	5–1	12 March 1933	
Gino Rossetti	Italy	Torino*	Bologna	3–2	12 March 1933	
Mario Romani	Italy	Milan*	Pro Patria	5–0	19 March 1933	
Angelo Schiavetta	Italy	Casale	Bari*	3–3	26 March 1933	
Felice Borel	Italy	Juventus*	Fiorentina*	5–0	28 May 1933	
Fernando Eusebio	Italy	Roma*	Fiorentina	7–1	28 May 1933	
Juan Spósito	Italy	Genoa*	Juventus	3–2	18 June 1933	
Giuseppe Meazza	Italy	Internazionale*	Casale	9–0	10 September 1933	
Filippo Prato	Italy	Torino*	Fiorentina	4–1	17 September 1933	
Vinicio Viani	Italy	Fiorentina*	Palermo	4–1	1 October 1933	
Felice Borel	Italy	Juventus	Roma*	3–2	1 October 1933	
Silvio Piola^{6}	Italy	Pro Vercelli*	Fiorentina	7–2	29 October 1933	
Julio Libonatti	Argentina	Torino*	Livorno	5–0	1 November 1933	
Ernesto Tomasi	Italy	Roma*	Lazio	5–0	1 November 1933	
Giuseppe Meazza^{4}	Italy	Internazionale	Lazio*	4–1	5 November 1933	
Renato Cesarini	Italy	Juventus*	Genoa	8–1	19 November 1933	
Vinicio Viani	Italy	Fiorentina	Internazionale*	4–2	26 November 1933	
Giovanni Riccardi	Italy	Pro Vercelli*	Alessandria	3–1	17 December 1933	
Pietro Arcari	Italy	Milan*	Casale	6–2	7 January 1934	
Giovanni Moretti	Italy	Milan*	Casale	6–2	7 January 1934	
Leonízio Fantoni	Brazil	Lazio*	Milan	4–0	21 January 1934	
Onesto Silano	Brazil	Torino*	Milan	3–3	8 April 1934	
Enrique Guaita	Italy	Roma*	Genoa	3–0	15 April 1934	
Giovanni Busoni	Italy	Livorno*	Lazio	4–1	15 April 1934	
Francisco Fedullo	Italy	Bologna*	Brescia	4–1	22 April 1934	
Enrique Guaita^{4}	Italy	Roma	Torino	6–3	26 April 1934	
Giovanni Busoni	Italy	Livorno*	Casale	5–0	29 April 1934	
Giuseppe Meazza	Italy	Internazionale*	Triestina	7–0	14 October 1934	
Giuseppe Meazza	Italy	Internazionale*	Brescia	5–1	6 January 1935	
Giuseppe Meazza	Italy	Internazionale*	Palermo	4–0	13 October 1935	
Giuseppe Meazza	Italy	Internazionale*	Juventus	4–0	17 November 1935	
Giuseppe Meazza	Italy	Internazionale	Novara*	5–3	20 September 1936	
Silvio Piola	Italy	Lazio	Alessandria*	5–1	2 May 1937	
Silvio Piola	Italy	Lazio*	Napoli	4–0	9 May 1937	
Danilo Michelini	Italy	Roma*	Fiorentina	4–0	12 September 1937	
Giuseppe Meazza^{5}	Italy	Internazionale*	Bari	9–2	9 January 1938	
Giuseppe Meazza	Italy	Internazionale*	Lucchese	4–0	16 January 1938	
Vittorio Barberis	Italy	Novara*	Roma	5–0	22 January 1939	
Elisio Gabardo	Italy	Genoa	Fiorentina*	3–4	6 October 1940	
Francesco Cergoli	Italy	Triestina*	Atalanta	3–3	13 October 1940	
Guglielmo Gabetto	Italy	Juventus*	Bologna	3–1	13 October 1940	
Amedeo Amadei	Italy	Roma*	Venezia*	5–2	27 October 1940	
Franco Ossola	Italy	Torino*	Fiorentina	6–2	24 November 1940	
Guglielmo Gabetto	Italy	Juventus*	Atalanta	3–1	22 December 1940	
Guglielmo Gabetto	Italy	Juventus*	Bari	5–1	5 January 1941	
Amedeo Amadei	Italy	Roma*	Bari	6–2	23 February 1941	
Giacomo Neri	Italy	Genoa	Torino*	6–3	6 April 1941	
Aldo Boffi	Italy	Milan	Fiorentina*	3–2	13 April 1941	
Sergio Trevisan	Italy	Bari*	Juventus	3–5	20 April 1941	
Giacomo Neri^{4}	Italy	Genoa	Bari*	6–1	27 April 1941	
Enrico Santià	Italy	Novara*	Atalanta	5–1	27 April 1941	
Dante Di Benedetti	Italy	Fiorentina*	Juventus	5–0	4 May 1941	
Amedeo Amadei	Italy	Roma*	Napoli	5–1	25 October 1941	
Silvio Piola	Italy	Lazio*	Bologna	5–1	21 December 1941	
Silvio Piola	Italy	Lazio*	Liguria	4–0	1 March 1942	
Amedeo Amadei	Italy	Roma*	Liguria	7–0	17 May 1942	
Silvio Piola	Italy	Lazio*	Internazionale	3–1	25 October 1942	
Silvio Piola	Italy	Lazio*	Juventus	5–3	8 November 1942	
Pietro Ferraris	Italy	Torino*	Fiorentina	5–0	8 November 1942	
Guglielmo Trevisan	Italy	Genoa*	Livorno	5–2	13 December 1942	
Piero Suppi	Italy	Fiorentina*	Roma	3–0	17 January 1943	
Giuseppe Baldini	Italy	Internazionale	Atalanta*	5–2	21 January 1943	
Alberto Marchetti	Italy	Vicenza*	Fiorentina	3–0	31 January 1943	
Angelo Bollano	Italy	Fiorentina*	Milan	3–0	7 February 1943	
Amedeo Amadei^{4}	Italy	Roma*	Liguria	5–1	21 February 1943	
Mario Stua	Italy	Livorno*	Internazionale	4–2	7 March 1943	
Riza Lushta	Albania	Juventus*	Livorno	3–0	21 March 1943	
Franco Ossola	Italy	Torino	Triestina*	3–2	21 March 1943	
Camillo Fabbri	Italy	Bari*	Fiorentina	4–2	28 March 1943	
Pietro Magni^{4}	Italy	Juventus*	Triestina	6–2	28 March 1943	
Alberto Marchetti	Italy	Vicenza	Juventus*	6–2	25 April 1943	
Engelbert König	Austria	Lazio	Fiorentina*	3–4	18 November 1945	
Teresio Piana	Italy	Livorno*	Salernitana	3–0	2 December 1945	
Romano Penzo	Italy	Internazionale*	Genoa	9–1	23 December 1945	
Carlo Barbieri	Italy	Napoli*	Siena	6–1	6 January 1946	
Gino Cappello	Italy	Bologna*	Genoa	4–0	13 January 1946	
Adriano Bassetto	Italy	Vicenza	Milan*	4–2	3 February 1946	
Mario Gritti	Italy	Fiorentina*	Salernitana	4–0	10 February 1946	
Vittorio Sentimenti^{4}	Italy	Juventus*	Venezia	5–0	17 March 1946	
Engelbert König	Austria	Lazio*	Pescara	6–0	17 March 1946	
Eusebio Castigliano^{4}	Italy	Torino*	Napoli	7–1	30 June 1946	
Enrico Candiani^{4}	Italy	Internazionale*	Torino	6–2	14 July 1946	
Aredio Gimona	Italy	Milan*	Bari	8–0	28 July 1946	
Guglielmo Gabetto	Italy	Torino*	Livorno	9–1	30 July 1946	
Amedeo Amadei	Italy	Roma*	Sampdoria	3–1	22 September 1946	
Costantino De Andreis	Italy	Lazio*	Brescia	6–3	20 October 1946	
Adriano Bassetto	Italy	Sampdoria*	Bari	6–1	24 November 1946	
Carlo Stradella	Italy	Alessandria*	Triestina	5–0	12 January 1947	
Mario Astorri^{4}	Italy	Juventus*	Venezia	7–3	19 January 1947	
Juan Carlos Verdeal^{4}	Italy	Genoa*	Fiorentina	5–0	19 January 1947	
Valentino Mazzola	Italy	Torino*	Lazio	5–1	23 February 1947	
Stefano Ferrari	Italy	Roma*	Triestina	4–1	9 March 1947	
Federico Zanolla	Italy	Triestina*	Bologna	3–1	16 March 1947	
Valentino Mazzola	Italy	Torino*	Vicenza	6–0	20 April 1947	
Cosimo Muci	Italy	Internazionale*	Alessandria	4–2	4 May 1947	
Umberto Busani	Italy	Napoli*	Bari	5–1	4 May 1947	
Valentino Mazzola	Italy	Torino*	Atalanta	5–3	1 June 1947	
Ettore Puricelli	Italy	Milan*	Bologna	4–2	1 June 1947	
Valentino Mazzola	Italy	Torino*	Genoa	6–0	8 June 1947	
Pietro Sotgiu	Italy	Alessandria*	Milan	4–1	8 June 1947	
Riza Lushta	Albania	Alessandria	Triestina*	3–1	15 June 1947	
Guglielmo Gabetto	Italy	Torino*	Milan	6–2	29 June 1947	
Bruno Quaresima^{4}	Italy	Internazionale*	Alessandria	6–0	28 September 1947	
Valentino Mazzola	Italy	Torino	Roma*	7–1	5 October 1947	
Benito Lorenzi^{4}	Italy	Internazionale*	Lucchese	6–0	26 October 1947	
Adriano Bassetto	Italy	Sampdoria*	Vicenza	6–1	2 November 1947	
Guido Tieghi	Italy	Livorno*	Internazionale	3–2	16 November 1947	
Ezio Loik	Italy	Torino*	Salernitana	7–1	16 November 1947	
Giampiero Boniperti	Italy	Juventus*	Livorno	6–1	23 November 1947	
Bruno Quaresima^{4}	Italy	Internazionale*	Bari	4–1	30 November 1947	
Aristide Coscia	Italy	Alessandria*	Salernitana	3–0	28 December 1947	
Carlo Stradella^{4}	Italy	Alessandria*	Roma	4–0	1 January 1948	
Bruno Pesaola	Italy	Roma	Genoa*	4–2	4 January 1948	
Ettore Puricelli^{4}	Italy	Milan*	Bari	8–1	4 January 1948	
Ermes Muccinelli	Italy	Juventus*	Alessandria	6–1	15 February 1948	
Mario Silvestrelli	Italy	Sampdoria	Internazionale*	4–2	7 March 1948	
Guglielmo Gabetto	Italy	Torino*	Bologna	5–1	11 April 1948	
Carlo Barbieri	Italy	Napoli	Juventus	3–1	15 April 1948	
Ezio Loik	Italy	Torino*	Alessandria	10–0	2 May 1948	
Alberto Galassi	Italy	Fiorentina*	Genoa	4–0	6 June 1948	
Riccardo Dalla Torre	Italy	Genoa*	Bologna	7–2	4 July 1948	
István Nyers	Hungary	Internazionale*	Sampdoria	4–2	19 September 1948	
Lelio Antoniotti	Italy	Pro Patria	Sampdoria*	4–4	10 October 1948	
Adriano Bassetto	Italy	Sampdoria*	Pro Patria	4–4	10 October 1948	
Giampiero Boniperti	Italy	Juventus	Atalanta*	4–2	17 October 1948	
Amedeo Amadei^{4}	Italy	Internazionale*	Bari	9–1	31 October 1948	
Alberto Galassi	Italy	Fiorentina*	Lazio	4–0	2 January 1949	
István Mike Mayer^{5}	Italy	Bologna*	Livorno	6–2	6 February 1949	
Renzo Burini	Italy	Milan*	Modena	5–1	3 April 1949	
Bruno Ispiro^{5}	Italy	Triestina*	Padova	9–1	8 May 1949	
Karl Aage Hansen	Denmark	Bologna	Atalanta*	6–2	11 September 1949	
John Hansen	Denmark	Juventus*	Fiorentina	5–2	11 September 1949	
Alberto Galassi^{4}	Italy	Fiorentina*	Roma	4–1	2 October 1949	
Adriano Bassetto^{4}	Italy	Venezia	Sampdoria*	7–3	16 October 1949	
Amedeo Amadei	Italy	Internazionale*	Milan	6–5	6 November 1949	
Adriano Bassetto^{4}	Italy	Sampdoria*	Palermo	4–0	6 November 1949	
Giampiero Boniperti	Italy	Juventus	Novara*	3–2	18 December 1949	
Giuseppe Santagostino^{4}	Italy	Milan*	Bari	9–1	18 December 1949	
István Nyers	Hungary	Internazionale	Como*	5–1	26 December 1949	
Karl Aage Hansen	Denmark	Atalanta*	Venezia	3–1	1 January 1950	
István Nyers^{4}	Hungary	Internazionale*	Bari	4–0	8 January 1950	
Gunnar Nordahl	Sweden	Milan	Como*	4–1	22 January 1950	
Gunnar Nordahl	Sweden	Milan	Juventus*	7–1	5 February 1950	
Gunnar Nordahl^{4}	Sweden	Milan*	Torino	7–0	5 March 1950	
Giampiero Boniperti	Italy	Juventus	Como*	6–2	12 March 1950	
Benjamín Santos	Argentina	Torino*	Roma	5–0	12 March 1950	
Giancarlo Vitali	Hungary	Padova*	Lucchese	3–2	30 April 1950	
Giampiero Boniperti	Italy	Juventus	Sampdoria*	4–0	28 May 1950	
Giuseppe Rinaldi	Italy	Milan*	Roma	6–2	28 May 1950	
Gunnar Nordahl	Sweden	Milan*	Novara	9–2	24 September 1950	
István Nyers	Hungary	Internazionale*	Roma	6–0	22 October 1950	
Faas Wilkes	Netherlands	Internazionale	Sampdoria	5–1	5 November 1950	
Silvio Piola	Italy	Novara*	Lazio	4–2	19 November 1950	
Giampiero Boniperti	Italy	Juventus	Atalanta*	5–1	14 January 1951	
Jørgen Leschly Sørensen	Denmark	Atalanta*	Palermo	3–2	21 January 1951	
Renzo Burini	Italy	Milan*	Palermo	9–0	18 February 1951	
István Nyers	Hungary	Internazionale	Napoli*	4–0	18 February 1951	
István Nyers	Hungary	Internazionale*	Pro Patria	6–0	25 February 1951	
István Nyers	Hungary	Internazionale*	Udinese	6–1	11 March 1951	
Gunnar Nordahl	Sweden	Milan*	Como	7–2	18 March 1951	
Gunnar Nordahl	Sweden	Milan*	Padova	3–1	1 April 1951	
István Nyers	Hungary	Internazionale*	Triestina	5–1	9 September 1951	
Mario Renosto	Italy	Milan*	Pro Patria	5–1	30 September 1951	
István Nyers	Hungary	Internazionale*	Legnano	3–1	21 October 1951	
John Hansen	Denmark	Juventus*	Udinese	5–1	28 October 1951	
Renzo Burini	Italy	Milan*	Bologna	4–0	28 October 1951	
István Nyers	Hungary	Internazionale	Sampdoria*	3–1	30 December 1951	
Pietro Broccini	Italy	Internazionale*	Padova	4–0	13 January 1952	
Gunnar Nordahl	Sweden	Milan*	Novara	6–2	3 February 1952	
Adriano Bassetto	Italy	Sampdoria*	Triestina	3–1	10 February 1952	
Giampiero Boniperti	Italy	Juventus*	Legnano	6–1	10 February 1952	
John Hansen	Denmark	Juventus*	Legnano	6–1	10 February 1952	
Gunnar Nordahl	Sweden	Milan	Lucchese*	5–0	20 February 1952	
Pasquale Vivolo	Italy	Juventus	Udinese*	7–2	30 March 1952	
Renzo Burini	Italy	Milan*	Atalanta	4–4	11 May 1952	
Hasse Jeppson^{4}	Sweden	Atalanta*	Triestina	7–1	8 June 1952	
Gunnar Nordahl	Sweden	Milan*	Palermo	4–0	8 June 1952	
Hasse Jeppson	Sweden	Atalanta*	Torino	5–0	15 June 1952	
Giancarlo Vitali	Italy	Napoli*	Udinese	4–2	28 September 1952	
Poul Rasmussen^{4}	Denmark	Atalanta*	Triestina	5–2	2 November 1952	
Pasquale Vivolo	Italy	Juventus	Novara*	6–0	16 November 1952	
Pasquale Vivolo	Italy	Juventus*	Sampdoria	3–0	23 November 1952	
Poul Rasmussen	Denmark	Atalanta*	Udinese	5–0	11 January 1953	
Gunnar Nordahl	Sweden	Milan*	Atalanta	5–1	18 January 1953	
Gunnar Nordahl	Sweden	Milan*	Palermo	5–0	1 February 1953	
Gunnar Nordahl	Sweden	Milan*	Triestina	4–1	1 March 1953	
Renzo Burini	Italy	Milan	Fiorentina*	3–0	3 May 1953	
Adriano Bassetto	Italy	Atalanta	Napoli*	3–6	27 September 1953	
Hasse Jeppson	Sweden	Napoli*	Atalanta	6–3	27 September 1953	
Giampiero Boniperti	Italy	Juventus	Genoa*	3–1	20 October 1953	
Gunnar Nordahl	Sweden	Milan	Palermo*	4–1	18 October 1953	
István Nyers	Hungary	Internazionale*	Milan	3–0	1 November 1953	
Sergio Brighenti	Italy	Internazionale*	Palermo	4–0	3 January 1954	
Egisto Pandolfini	Italy	Roma*	Legnano	5–3	10 January 1954	
Jørgen Leschly Sørensen	Denmark	Milan	SPAL*	6–1	10 January 1954	
Gunnar Nordahl^{4}	Sweden	Milan	Triestina*	6–0	21 February 1954	
Eduardo Ricagni	Italy	Juventus*	Palermo	4–1	23 May 1954	
Gunnar Nordahl	Sweden	Milan	Sampdoria*	3–0	26 September 1954	
István Nyers	Hungary	Roma*	Novara	9–0	6 February 1955	
Gino Pivatelli	Italy	Bologna*	Internazionale	3–2	10 April 1955	
Poul Rasmussen	Denmark	Atalanta*	Fiorentina	5–1	17 April 1955	
Gunnar Nordahl	Sweden	Milan	Genoa*	8–0	5 June 1955	
Gunnar Nordahl^{4}	Sweden	Milan*	SPAL	6–0	12 June 1955	
Gino Pivatelli	Italy	Bologna*	Genoa	4–1	18 September 1955	
Luís Vinício	Brazil	Napoli*	Pro Patria	8–1	16 October 1955	
Eddie Firmani^{4}	Italy	Sampdoria*	Pro Patria	7–0	1 January 1956	
Adriano Bassetto	Italy	Atalanta*	Pro Patria	4–1	29 January 1956	
Gino Pivatelli	Italy	Bologna*	Torino	6–1	7 March 1956	
Eddie Firmani	Italy	Sampdoria*	SPAL	3–1	1 April 1956	
Gino Pivatelli	Italy	Bologna	Sampdoria*	5–2	13 May 1956	
Oliviero Conti	Italy	Sampdoria	Milan*	3–2	26 December 1956	
Luís Vinício^{4}	Brazil	Napoli*	Palermo	4–1	9 June 1957	
Kurt Hamrin	Sweden	Padova	Genoa*	4–1	15 September 1957	
Antonio Angelillo	Italy	Internazionale*	Lazio	5–2	22 September 1957	
Gastone Bean	Italy	Milan*	Atalanta	5–0	27 October 1957	
Kurt Hamrin	Sweden	Padova*	Torino	3–0	27 October 1957	
John Charles	Wales	Juventus*	Atalanta	3–0	15 December 1957	
John Charles	Wales	Juventus*	Sampdoria	4–1	8 January 1958	
Kurt Hamrin^{4}	Sweden	Padova*	Genoa	6–3	2 February 1958	
Emanuele Del Vecchio^{5}	Italy	Verona*	Sampdoria	5–3	9 February 1958	
Eddie Firmani	Italy	Sampdoria	Vicenza*	4–2	16 March 1958	
Omar Sívori^{4}	Italy	Juventus*	Vicenza	5–2	30 March 1958	
John Charles	Wales	Juventus	Lazio*	4–1	6 April 1958	
Carlo Galli^{5}	Italy	Milan*	Lazio	6–1	13 April 1958	
Paolo Barison	Italy	Genoa	Milan*	5–1	25 May 1958	
Antonio Angelillo	Italy	Internazionale	Udinese*	3–1	21 September 1958	
Antonio Angelillo^{5}	Italy	Internazionale*	SPAL	8–0	12 October 1958	
Gino Pivatelli	Italy	Bologna	Fiorentina*	3–6	23 November 1958	
José Altafini	Italy	Milan*	Torino	5–1	21 December 1958	
Eddie Firmani	Italy	Internazionale	Torino*	5–0	28 December 1958	
Carlo Galli	Italy	Milan*	Padova	4–1	11 January 1959	
Giancarlo Bacci	Italy	Milan*	Sampdoria	4–1	22 February 1959	
Kurt Hamrin	Sweden	Fiorentina*	Sampdoria	4–1	15 March 1959	
Omar Sívori	Italy	Juventus*	Fiorentina	3–2	22 March 1959	
Sergio Brighenti	Italy	Padova*	Vicenza	4–2	17 May 1959	
Kurt Hamrin	Sweden	Fiorentina*	Torino	4–0	28 May 1959	
Carlo Galli	Italy	Milan*	Udinese	7–0	2 June 1959	
John Charles	Wales	Juventus*	Genoa	4–3	7 June 1959	
Eddie Firmani	Italy	Internazionale*	Padova	6–3	20 September 1959	
Juan Carlos Tacchi	Argentina	Alessandria*	Milan	3–1	20 September 1959	
Kurt Hamrin	Sweden	Fiorentina	Napoli*	4–0	14 February 1960	
Omar Sívori	Italy	Juventus*	Padova	5–1	14 February 1960	
John Charles	Wales	Juventus	SPAL*	6–3	21 February 1960	
José Altafini^{4}	Italy	Milan*	Internazionale	5–3	27 March 1960	
Sergio Brighenti	Italy	Padova*	SPAL	6–3	20 September 1959	
Omar Sívori	Italy	Juventus*	Napoli	4–2	17 April 1960	
Gino Pivatelli	Italy	Bologna*	Roma	3–1	1 May 1960	
Eddie Firmani	Italy	Internazionale	Atalanta*	5–1	25 September 1960	
Pedro Manfredini	Italy	Roma	Bari*	3–0	25 September 1960	
Sergio Brighenti	Italy	Sampdoria*	Fiorentina	3–1	2 October 1960	
Kurt Hamrin	Sweden	Fiorentina*	Lazio	4–0	20 November 1960	
Omar Sívori	Italy	Juventus*	Udinese	5–1	5 February 1961	
Eddie Firmani^{4}	Italy	Internazionale*	S.S. Lazio	7–0	5 March 1961	
Omar Sívori	Italy	Juventus	Bologna*	4–2	26 March 1961	
Sergio Brighenti^{4}	Italy	Sampdoria*	Internazionale	4–2	2 April 1961	
Omar Sívori^{6}	Italy	Juventus*	Internazionale	9–1	16 April 1961	
Aurelio Milani	Italy	Padova*	Sampdoria	3–0	7 May 1961	
Omar Sívori	Italy	Juventus	Napoli*	4–0	21 May 1961	
José Altafini^{4}	Italy	Milan*	Juventus	5–1	12 November 1961	
Sergio Brighenti	Italy	Sampdoria*	Catania	4–1	14 January 1962	
Aurelio Milani	Italy	Fiorentina*	Internazionale	4–1	21 January 1962	
Giancarlo Danova	Italy	Milan*	Bologna	3–0	21 January 1962	
Ezio Pascutti	Italy	Bologna*	Modena	7–1	14 October 1962	
Harald Nielsen	Denmark	Bologna*	Modena	7–1	14 October 1962	
Pedro Manfredini	Italy	Roma	Palermo*	4–0	1 November 1962	
China	Italy	Sampdoria*	Catania*	4–0	4 November 1962	
Kurt Hamrin^{4}	Sweden	Fiorentina*	Genoa	5–0	4 November 1962	
Kurt Hamrin	Sweden	Fiorentina	Torino*	4–0	9 December 1962	
Harald Nielsen	Denmark	Bologna*	Catania	5–0	9 December 1962	
Pedro Manfredini	Italy	Roma	Napoli*	3–3	20 January 1963	
Omar Sívori	Italy	Juventus	Atalanta*	6–3	27 January 1963	
Beniamino Di Giacomo	Italy	Internazionale	Napoli*	5–1	17 February 1963	
Mario Pantaleoni	Italy	Genoa*	Catania*	4–1	3 March 1963	
Luis Suárez	Spain	Internazionale*	Genoa*	6–0	10 March 1963	
Pedro Manfredini	Italy	Roma*	Torino	5–0	7 April 1963	
Harald Nielsen	Denmark	Bologna*	Sampdoria	4–1	7 April 1963	
José Altafini	Italy	Milan	Mantova*	4–1	15 September 1963	
Pedro Manfredini	Italy	Roma*	Sampdoria	6–1	22 September 1963	
Harald Nielsen	Denmark	Bologna	Modena*	4–1	6 October 1963	
Harald Nielsen	Denmark	Bologna	Roma*	4–0	3 November 1963	
Luís Vinício	Brazil	Vicenza	Modena*	3–2	3 November 1963	
Silvano Mencacci^{4}	Italy	SPAL*	Mantova	6–1	10 November 1963	
Harald Nielsen	Denmark	Bologna	Catania*	3–1	8 December 1963	
Paolo Morelli	Italy	Messina*	Sampdoria	4–3	26 January 1964	
Kurt Hamrin^{5}	Sweden	Fiorentina	Atalanta*	7–1	2 February 1964	
Giovanni Fanello	Italy	Catania*	Genoa	5–3	2 February 1964	
Antonio Angelillo	Italy	Roma*	Fiorentina	3–3	11 October 1964	
Alberto Orlando	Italy	Fiorentina*	Genoa	5–0	17 January 1965	
Giampaolo Menichelli	Italy	Juventus*	Catania	4–1	7 February 1965	
Jarbas Faustinho	Brazil	Napoli*	SPAL	4–2	6 September 1965	
José Altafini	Italy	Napoli*	Atalanta	5–1	17 October 1965	
Paolo Nuti	Brazil	Fiorentina*	Sampdoria	5–0	24 October 1965	
Angelo Sormani	Italy	Milan*	Varese	3–1	14 November 1965	
Sandro Mazzola	Italy	Internazionale*	Foggia	5–0	27 February 1966	
Sandro Mazzola	Italy	Internazionale*	Brescia	7–0	13 March 1966	
Virginio De Paoli	Italy	Brescia*	Foggia	4–0	27 March 1966	
Ezio Pascutti	Italy	Bologna*	Atalanta	3–0	10 April 1966	
Kurt Hamrin	Sweden	Fiorentina*	Lazio	5–1	18 September 1966	
Sandro Mazzola	Italy	Internazionale	Foggia*	4–0	18 September 1966	
Gigi Riva	Italy	Cagliari*	Bologna	4–0	2 October 1966	
Mario Brugnera	Italy	Fiorentina*	Vicenza	3–0	6 November 1966	
Renato Cappellini	Italy	Internazionale*	Foggia	3–0	29 January 1967	
Kurt Hamrin	Sweden	Fiorentina*	Brescia	7–1	5 February 1967	
José Altafini	Italy	Napoli	SPAL*	4–1	5 February 1967	
Angelo Sormani	Italy	Milan	SPAL*	4–1	24 September 1967	
Néstor Combin	Argentina	Torino*	Sampdoria*	4–2	15 October 1967	
Néstor Combin	Argentina	Torino	Juventus*	4–0	22 October 1967	
Giuseppe Savoldi	Italy	Atalanta*	Varese	4–0	22 October 1967	
Orlando Rozzoni	Italy	SPAL*	Vicenza	3–0	28 January 1968	
Pietro Anastasi	Italy	Varese*	Juventus	5–0	4 February 1968	
Sergio Gori	Italy	Vicenza*	Atalanta	4–1	31 March 1968	
Gigi Riva	Italy	Cagliari	Varese*	6–1	6 October 1968	
Vincenzo Traspedini	Italy	Hellas*	Pisa	5–3	10 November 1968	
Sergio Pellizzaro	Italy	Palermo*	Atalanta	5–1	1 December 1968	
Sergio Clerici	Brazil	Atalanta*	Hellas	5–2	12 January 1969	
Mario Bertini	Italy	Internazionale*	Hellas	5–1	19 January 1969	
Pierino Prati	Italy	Milan*	Hellas	3–0	9 February 1969	
Pierino Prati	Italy	Milan*	Bologna	4–0	23 March 1969	
Gianni Rivera^{4}	Italy	Milan	Brescia*	4–1	14 September 1969	
Pierino Prati^{4}	Italy	Milan	Bari*	5–0	18 January 1970	
Claudio Turchetto	Italy	Brescia*	Palermo*	4–2	1 March 1970	
Pierino Prati	Italy	Milan*	Vicenza	3–1	22 November 1970	
Pierino Prati	Italy	Milan*	Catania	4–0	3 January 1971	
Roberto Bettega	Italy	Juventus*	Catania	5–0	31 January 1971	
Mario Maraschi	Italy	Vicenza	Vicenza*	3–2	28 February 1971	
Eraldo Mancin	Italy	Cagliari*	Hellas	4–1	23 May 1971	
Roberto Boninsegna	Italy	Internazionale*	Sampdoria	4–4	9 January 1972	
Giorgio Mariani	Italy	Hellas*	Sampdoria	3–2	26 March 1972	
Franco Causio	Italy	Juventus*	Internazionale	3–0	23 April 1972	
Pierino Prati	Italy	Milan*	Atalanta	9–3	15 October 1972	
Giuseppe Savoldi	Italy	Bologna*	Hellas	4–1	15 April 1973	
Roberto Boninsegna^{4}	Italy	Internazionale*	Foggia	5–1	18 November 1973	
Roberto Boninsegna	Italy	Internazionale*	Torino	3–0	3 March 1974	
Giorgio Chinaglia	Italy	Lazio	Napoli*	3–3	7 April 1974	
Pietro Anastasi	Italy	Juventus*	Fiorentina	3–1	12 May 1974	
Pietro Anastasi	Italy	Juventus	Vicenza*	3–0	19 May 1974	
Giorgio Braglia	Italy	Napoli*	Ascoli	3–1	30 September 1974	
Roberto Boninsegna^{4}	Italy	Internazionale*	Cagliari	4–1	6 October 1974	
Paolino Pulici	Italy	Torino*	Bologna	3–3	16 March 1975	
Paolino Pulici	Italy	Torino	Lazio*	5–1	6 April 1975	
Pietro Anastasi	Italy	Juventus*	Lazio	4–0	27 April 1975	
Pierino Prati	Italy	Roma*	Ternana	4–2	11 May 1975	
Egidio Calloni	Italy	Milan	Ternana*	3–1	18 May 1975	
Paolino Pulici	Italy	Torino*	Perugia	3–0	12 October 1975	
Paolino Pulici	Italy	Torino*	Bologna	3–1	9 February 1976	
Paolino Pulici	Italy	Torino*	Fiorentina	4–3	18 April 1976	
Carlo Bresciani	Italy	Sampdoria*	Hellas	3–1	5 December 1976	
Carlo Muraro	Italy	Internazionale*	Roma	3–0	2 January 1977	
Francesco Graziani	Italy	Torino	Sampdoria*	3–2	13 February 1977	
Francesco Graziani	Italy	Torino	Cesena*	3–0	17 April 1977	
Claudio Desolati	Italy	Fiorentina*	Internazionale	3–0	15 May 1977	
Giuseppe Savoldi	Italy	Napoli*	Perugia	3–2	6 November 1977	
Giuseppe Savoldi^{4}	Italy	Napoli*	Foggia	5–0	18 December 1977	
Paolo Rossi	Italy	Vicenza	Lazio*	3–1	12 March 1978	
Alberto Bigon	Italy	Milan*	Fiorentina	4–1	29 October 1978	
Carlo Trevisanello	Italy	Ascoli	Hellas*	3–2	29 October 1978	
Bruno Giordano	Italy	Lazio*	Vicenza	4–3	29 October 1978	
Francesco Graziani	Italy	Torino*	Vicenza	4–0	12 November 1978	
Paolino Pulici	Italy	Torino*	Catanzaro	3–0	21 January 1979	
Paolo Rossi^{4}	Italy	Vicenza*	Lazio	4–1	4 March 1979	
Massimo Palanca	Italy	Catanzaro	Roma*	3–1	4 March 1979	
Pietro Paolo Virdis	Italy	Juventus*	Atalanta	3–0	8 April 1979	
Alessandro Altobelli	Italy	Internazionale*	Juventus	4–0	11 October 1979	
Roberto Pruzzo	Italy	Roma	Internazionale*	4–2	26 October 1980	
Roberto Pruzzo	Italy	Roma*	Udinese	3–1	30 November 1980	
Roberto Bettega	Italy	Juventus*	Cesena	6–1	13 September 1981	
Pietro Paolo Virdis	Italy	Juventus*	Avellino	4–0	31 January 1982	
Giuseppe Galderisi	Italy	Juventus*	Milan	3–2	14 February 1982	
Claudio Pellegrini	Italy	Napoli	Como*	4–0	28 February 1982	
Oliviero Garlini	Italy	Cesena*	Bologna	4–1	14 March 1982	
Franco Selvaggi	Italy	Torino*	Sampdoria	3–0	17 October 1982	
Alessandro Altobelli	Italy	Internazionale*	Cesena	3–1	20 March 1983	
Trevor Francis	England	Sampdoria	Udinese*	4–0	24 April 1983	
Paolo Monelli	Italy	Fiorentina*	Napoli	5–1	12 September 1983	
Oscar Damiani	Italy	Milan	Ascoli*	4–2	11 December 1983	
Alessandro Altobelli	Italy	Internazionale*	Catania	6–0	13 May 1984	
Diego Maradona	Argentina	Napoli*	Lazio	4–0	24 February 1985	
Antonio Di Carlo	Italy	Roma	Cremonese*	5–0	5 May 1985	
Michel Platini	France	Juventus*	Bari	4–0	20 October 1985	
Roberto Pruzzo^{5}	Italy	Roma*	Avellino	5–1	16 February 1986	
Aldo Cantarutti	Italy	Atalanta	Verona*	3–0	23 March 1986	
Alessandro Altobelli	Italy	Internazionale*	Como*	3–2	20 April 1986	
Alessandro Altobelli	Italy	Internazionale*	Roma	4–1	5 October 1986	
Wim Kieft	Netherlands	Torino*	Avellino	4–1	2 November 1986	
Salvatore Giunta	Italy	Como*	Udinese	3–1	30 November 1986	
Pietro Paolo Virdis	Italy	Milan*	Roma	4–1	3 May 1987	
Toni Polster	Austria	Torino*	Sampdoria	4–1	20 September 1987	
Pietro Paolo Virdis	Italy	Milan*	Fiorentina	4–0	9 October 1988	
Andrea Carnevale	Italy	Napoli*	Pescara	8–2	23 October 1988	
Careca	Brazil	Napoli	Juventus*	5–3	20 November 1988	
Tita	Brazil	Pescara	Roma*	3–1	19 February 1989	
Marco van Basten	Netherlands	Milan*	Ascoli	5–1	18 June 1989	
Jürgen Klinsmann	Germany	Internazionale	Verona*	3–0	5 November 1989	
Roberto Baggio	Italy	Fiorentina*	Ascoli	5–1	19 November 1989	
Marco van Basten	Netherlands	Milan*	Atalanta	3–1	17 January 1990	
Jürgen Klinsmann	Germany	Internazionale	Cagliari*	3–0	9 September 1990	
Aldo Serena	Italy	Internazionale*	Pisa	6–3	21 October 1990	
Salvatore Schillaci	Italy	Juventus*	Roma	5–0	18 November 1990	
Michele Padovano	Italy	Pisa*	Cesena	3–2	2 December 1990	
Pierluigi Casiraghi	Italy	Juventus	Pisa*	5–1	13 January 1991	
Carlos Aguilera	Uruguay	Genoa	Bologna*	3–0	10 March 1991	
Marco van Basten	Netherlands	Milan*	Bologna	6–0	12 May 1991	
Francesco Baiano	Italy	Foggia*	Bari	4–1	3 November 1991	
Marco van Basten	Netherlands	Milan*	Foggia	3–1	19 January 1992	
Tomáš Skuhravý	Czechoslovakia	Genoa*	Napoli	3–4	19 January 1992	
Roberto Baggio	Italy	Juventus*	Foggia	4–1	2 February 1992	
Marco van Basten	Netherlands	Milan	Cagliari*	4–1	2 February 1992	
Gabriel Batistuta	Argentina	Fiorentina	Foggia*	3–3	9 February 1992	
Marco van Basten	Netherlands	Milan*	Atalanta	3–1	1 March 1992	
Carlo Cornacchia	Italy	Atalanta*	Foggia	4–4	12 April 1992	
Francesco Baiano	Italy	Foggia*	Verona	5–0	18 April 1992	
Marco Branca	Italy	Fiorentina	Verona*	3–2	26 April 1992	
Stefano Borgonovo	Italy	Fiorentina*	Napoli	4–2	17 May 1992	
Marco van Basten	Netherlands	Milan	Pescara*	5–4	13 September 1992	
Abel Balbo	Argentina	Udinese*	Pescara	5–2	4 October 1992	
Giuseppe Signori	Italy	Lazio*	Parma	5–2	4 October 1992	
Roberto Baggio^{4}	Italy	Juventus*	Udinese	5–1	8 November 1992	
Marco van Basten^{4}	Netherlands	Milan	Napoli*	5–1	8 November 1992	
Massimo Agostini	Italy	Ancona*	Brescia	5–1	8 November 1992	
Roberto Mancini	Italy	Sampdoria*	Foggia	3–3	3 January 1993	
Marco Branca	Italy	Udinese*	Fiorentina	4–0	10 January 1993	
Carlos Aguilera	Uruguay	Torino	Roma*	5–4	9 May 1993	
Roberto Baggio	Italy	Juventus*	Foggia	4–2	9 May 1993	
Massimo Agostini	Italy	Ancona*	Pescara	5–3	23 May 1993	
Faustino Asprilla	Colombia	Parma*	Torino	3–0	19 September 1993	
Rubén Sosa	Uruguay	Internazionale*	Parma	3–2	31 October 1993	
Roberto Baggio	Italy	Juventus*	Genoa	4–0	31 October 1993	
Giuseppe Signori	Italy	Lazio*	Genoa	4–0	28 November 1993	
Daniel Fonseca	Uruguay	Napoli*	Reggiana	5–0	28 November 1993	
Giuseppe Signori	Italy	Lazio*	Cagliari	4–0	13 February 1994	
Alessandro Del Piero	Italy	Juventus*	Parma	4–0	20 March 1994	
Julio Dely Valdés	Panama	Cagliari*	Reggiana	3–0	10 April 1994	
Giuseppe Signori	Italy	Lazio*	Atalanta	3–1	10 April 1994	
Gianluca Vialli	Italy	Juventus*	Lazio	6–1	17 April 1994	
Damiano Longhi	Italy	Padova*	Cremonese	3–2	8 January 1995	
Dejan Savićević^{4}	Yugoslavia	Milan	Bari*	5–3	15 January 1995	
Alen Bokšić	Croatia	Lazio*	Foggia	7–1	15 January 1995	
Abel Balbo	Argentina	Roma*	Internazionale	3–1	12 February 1995	
Marco Simone	Italy	Milan	Brescia*	5–0	5 March 1995	
Pierluigi Casiraghi^{4}	Italy	Lazio*	Fiorentina	8–2	5 March 1995	
Abel Balbo	Argentina	Roma	Cremonese*	5–2	4 June 1995	
Igor Protti	Italy	Bari*	Lazio	3–3	17 September 1995	
Gianluca Vialli	Italy	Juventus*	Torino	5–0	3 December 1995	
Enrico Chiesa	Italy	Sampdoria*	Bari	3–1	3 December 1995	
Marco Branca	Italy	Internazionale*	Cagliari	4–0	23 December 1995	
Abel Balbo	Argentina	Roma*	Sampdoria	3–1	21 January 1996	
Pierluigi Casiraghi	Italy	Lazio*	Cagliari	4–0	28 January 1996	
Giuseppe Signori	Italy	Lazio*	Bari	4–3	4 February 1996	
Luís Oliveira	Belgium	Cagliari*	Bari	4–2	3 March 1996	
Enrico Chiesa	Italy	Sampdoria*	Padova	3–1	10 March 1996	
Giuseppe Signori	Italy	Lazio*	Vicenza	3–0	31 March 1996	
Marco Branca	Italy	Internazionale*	Padova	8–2	14 April 1996	
Marco Delvecchio	Italy	Roma*	Napoli	4–1	21 April 1996	
Marcelo Otero^{4}	Uruguay	Vicenza	Fiorentina*	4–2	8 September 1996	
Giuseppe Signori	Italy	Lazio	Piacenza*	3–1	17 November 1996	
Roberto Mancini	Italy	Sampdoria	Udinese*	5–4	4 January 1997	
Filippo Inzaghi	Italy	Atalanta*	Sampdoria	4–0	9 March 1997	
Igor Protti	Italy	Lazio*	Reggiana	6–1	20 April 1997	
Hernán Crespo	Argentina	Parma*	Vicenza	3–0	11 May 1997	
Marco Negri	Italy	Perugia*	Bologna	5–1	15 May 1997	
Gabriel Batistuta	Argentina	Fiorentina	Udinese*	3–1	31 August 1997	
Dario Hübner	Italy	Brescia*	Sampdoria	3–3	13 September 1997	
Abel Balbo	Argentina	Roma*	Napoli	6–2	5 October 1997	
Roberto Baggio	Italy	Bologna*	Napoli	5–1	2 November 1997	
Vincenzo Montella	Italy	Sampdoria*	Napoli	6–2	21 December 1997	
Alessandro Del Piero	Italy	Juventus*	Empoli	5–2	21 December 1997	
Abel Balbo	Argentina	Roma*	Empoli	4–3	1 February 1998	
Ronaldo	Brazil	Internazionale*	Lecce	5–0	15 February 1998	
Kennet Andersson	Sweden	Bologna	Sampdoria*	3–2	29 March 1998	
George Weah	Liberia	Milan*	Atalanta	3–0	11 April 1998	
Filippo Inzaghi	Italy	Juventus*	Bologna	3–2	10 May 1998	
Gabriel Batistuta	Argentina	Fiorentina	Milan	3–1	26 September 1998	
Hernán Crespo	Argentina	Parma*	Udinese	4–1	15 November 1998	
Giuseppe Signori	Italy	Bologna	Vicenza*	4–0	15 November 1998	
Siniša Mihajlović	Serbia	Lazio*	Sampdoria	5–2	13 December 1998	
Filippo Inzaghi	Italy	Juventus*	Salernitana	3–0	20 December 1998	
Iván Zamorano	Chile	Internazionale*	Venezia	6–2	10 January 1999	
Abel Balbo	Argentina	Parma	Piacenza*	6–3	10 January 1999	
Gabriel Batistuta	Argentina	Fiorentina*	Cagliari	4–2	17 January 1999	
Hernán Crespo	Argentina	Parma	Juventus*	4–2	7 February 1999	
Youri Djorkaeff	France	Internazionale*	Empoli	5–1	7 February 1999	
Marco Di Vaio	Italy	Salernitana	Empoli*	3–2	14 February 1999	
Simone Inzaghi	Italy	Piacenza*	Bologna	5–0	27 February 1999	
Álvaro Recoba	Uruguay	Venezia*	Fiorentina	4–1	14 March 1999	
Patrick M'Boma	Cameroon	Cagliari*	Empoli	5–1	21 March 1999	
Vincenzo Montella	Italy	Sampdoria*	Internazionale	4–0	21 March 1999	
Marco Di Vaio	Italy	Salernitana*	Bologna	4–0	25 April 1999	
Oliver Bierhoff	Germany	Milan*	Empoli	4–0	15 May 1999	
Christian Vieri	Italy	Internazionale*	Hellas Verona	3–0	29 August 1999	
Gabriel Batistuta	Argentina	Fiorentina*	Hellas Verona	4–1	19 September 1999	
Andriy Shevchenko	Ukraine	Milan	Lazio*	4–4	3 October 1999	
Vincenzo Montella	Italy	Roma*	Bari	3–1	6 January 2000	
Andriy Shevchenko	Ukraine	Milan	Perugia*	3–0	30 January 2000	
Filippo Inzaghi	Italy	Juventus	Venezia*	4–0	20 February 2000	
Vincenzo Montella	Italy	Roma*	Fiorentina	4–0	19 February 2000	
Roberto Sosa	Italy	Udinese*	Internazionale	3–0	8 April 2000	
Zisis Vryzas	Greece	Perugia	Fiorentina*	4–3	5 November 2000	
Gabriel Batistuta	Argentina	Roma	Brescia*	4–2	5 November 2000	
Filippo Inzaghi	Italy	Juventus*	Vicenza	4–0	28 January 2001	
Dario Hübner	Italy	Brescia*	Udinese	3–1	11 February 2001	
Hernán Crespo	Argentina	Lazio*	Hellas Verona	5–3	25 February 2001	
Marco Di Vaio^{4}	Italy	Parma*	Bari	4–0	11 March 2001	
Christian Vieri	Italy	Internazionale	Perugia*	3–2	1 April 2001	
Roberto Baggio	Italy	Brescia	Lecce*	3–0	6 May 2001	
Giuseppe Signori	Italy	Bologna	Hellas Verona*	4–5	27 May 2001	
Roberto Baggio	Italy	Brescia*	Atalanta	3–3	30 September 2001	
Hernán Crespo	Argentina	Lazio*	Brescia	5–0	4 November 2001	
Marco Di Vaio	Italy	Parma*	Venezia	4–3	6 January 2002	
Hernán Crespo	Argentina	Lazio*	Venezia	4–2	3 March 2002	
Vincenzo Montella^{4}	Italy	Roma*	Lazio	5–1	10 March 2002	
Luca Toni	Italy	Brescia*	Perugia	3–0	24 March 2002	
Vincenzo Montella	Italy	Roma*	Chievo	5–0	28 April 2002	
David Trezeguet	France	Juventus*	Brescia	5–0	28 April 2002	
Francesco Totti	Italy	Roma	Brescia*	3–2	29 September 2002	
Filippo Inzaghi	Italy	Milan*	Torino	6–0	6 October 2002	
Antonio Di Natale	Italy	Empoli*	Reggina	4–2	17 November 2002	
Christian Vieri^{4}	Italy	Internazionale*	Brescia	4–0	1 December 2002	
Claudio López	Argentina	Lazio*	Internazionale	3–3	7 December 2002	
David Trezeguet	France	Juventus	Chievo*	4–1	19 January 2003	
Christian Vieri	Italy	Internazionale*	Empoli	3–0	26 January 2003	
Oliver Bierhoff	Germany	Chievo	Juventus*	3–4	24 May 2003	
Enrico Chiesa	Italy	Siena*	Empoli	4–0	20 September 2003	
Andrea Caracciolo	Italy	Brescia	Lecce*	4–1	5 October 2003	
Dino Fava	Italy	Udinese	Perugia*	3–3	26 October 2003	
Alessandro Del Piero	Italy	Juventus*	Siena	4–2	18 January 2004	
Tommaso Rocchi	Italy	Empoli*	Juventus	3–3	25 January 2004	
David Trezeguet	France	Juventus	Empoli*	3–3	25 January 2004	
Antonio Cassano	Italy	Roma*	Siena	6–0	22 February 2004	
Alberto Gilardino^{4}	Italy	Parma*	Udinese	4–3	16 May 2004	
Vincenzo Montella	Italy	Roma	Messina*	3–4	19 September 2004	
Adriano	Brazil	Internazionale*	Messina	5–0	4 December 2004	
Hernán Crespo	Argentina	Milan*	Lecce	5–2	6 January 2005	
Zlatan Ibrahimović	Sweden	Juventus*	Lecce	5–2	17 January 2005	
Francesco Flachi	Italy	Sampdoria*	Reggina	3–2	20 February 2005	
David Di Michele	Italy	Udinese	Palermo*	5–1	13 March 2005	
Tommaso Rocchi	Italy	Lazio	Lecce*	3–5	1 May 2005	
Cristiano Lucarelli^{4}	Italy	Livorno	Parma*	4–6	1 May 2005	
Alberto Gilardino^{4}	Italy	Parma*	Livorno	6–4	1 May 2005	
Adriano	Brazil	Internazionale*	Treviso	3–0	28 August 2005	
David Di Michele	Italy	Udinese	Siena*	3–2	15 October 2005	
Luca Toni	Italy	Fiorentina*	Parma	4–1	22 October 2005	
Erjon Bogdani	Albania	Siena	Palermo*	3–1	28 January 2006	
David Trezeguet	France	Juventus	Ascoli*	3–1	29 January 2006	
Filippo Inzaghi	Italy	Milan	Reggina*	4–1	12 February 2006	
Kaká	Brazil	Milan*	Chievo	4–1	9 April 2006	
Cristiano Lucarelli	Italy	Livorno*	Palermo	3–1	22 April 2006	
Rolando Bianchi	Italy	Reggina	Palermo*	3–4	10 September 2006	
Gionatha Spinesi	Italy	Catania*	Sampdoria	4–2	23 December 2006	
Cristiano Lucarelli	Italy	Livorno*	Catania	4–1	1 April 2007	
Hernán Crespo	Argentina	Internazionale*	Lazio	4–3	13 May 2007	
David Trezeguet	France	Juventus*	Livorno	5–1	25 August 2007	
Marco Borriello	Italy	Genoa*	Udinese	3–2	26 September 2007	
David Trezeguet	France	Juventus*	Empoli	3–0	31 October 2007	
Nicola Pozzi^{4}	Italy	Empoli*	Cagliari	4–1	9 December 2007	
Luca Vigiani	Italy	Reggina*	Catania	3–1	23 December 2007	
Marco Borriello	Italy	Genoa	Udinese*	5–3	24 February 2008	
Alessandro Del Piero	Italy	Juventus	Atalanta*	4–0	20 April 2008	
Kaká	Brazil	Milan*	Reggina	5–1	20 April 2008	
Filippo Inzaghi	Italy	Milan	Livorno*	4–1	27 April 2008	
Germán Denis	Argentina	Napoli*	Reggina	3–0	29 October 2008	
Diego Milito	Argentina	Genoa*	Reggina	4–0	9 November 2008	
Giuseppe Mascara	Italy	Catania*	Torino	3–2	16 November 2008	
Marco Di Vaio	Italy	Bologna*	Torino	4–2	13 December 2008	
Goran Pandev	North Macedonia	Lazio	Reggina*	3–2	11 January 2009	
Adrian Mutu	Romania	Fiorentina	Genoa*	3–3	15 February 2009	
Marco Di Vaio	Italy	Bologna*	Sampdoria	3–0	8 March 2009	
Filippo Inzaghi	Italy	Milan*	Atalanta	3–0	8 March 2009	
Sergio Pellissier	Italy	Chievo	Juventus*	3–3	5 April 2009	
Filippo Inzaghi	Italy	Milan*	Torino	5–1	19 April 2009	
Diego Milito	Argentina	Genoa*	Sampdoria	3–1	3 May 2009	
Antonio Di Natale	Italy	Udinese*	Catania	4–2	13 September 2009	
Francesco Totti	Italy	Roma*	Bari	3–1	22 November 2009	
Ronaldinho	Brazil	Milan*	Siena	4–0	17 January 2010	
Antonio Di Natale	Italy	Udinese*	Napoli	3–1	7 February 2010	
Adaílton	Brazil	Bologna	Genoa*	4–3	28 February 2010	
Cristiano Lucarelli	Italy	Livorno*	Roma	3–3	14 March 2010	
Mirko Vučinić	Montenegro	Roma*	Udinese	4–2	20 March 2010	
Fabrizio Miccoli	Italy	Palermo*	Bologna	3–1	27 March 2010	
Miloš Krasić	Serbia	Juventus*	Cagliari	4–2	26 September 2010	
Antonio Di Natale	Italy	Udinese*	Lecce	4–0	14 November 2010	
Javier Pastore	Argentina	Palermo*	Catania	3–1	14 November 2010	
Giampaolo Pazzini	Italy	Sampdoria	Lecce*	3–2	21 November 2010	
Antonio Di Natale	Italy	Udinese*	Napoli	3–1	28 November 2010	
Dejan Stanković	Serbia	Internazionale*	Parma	5–2	28 November 2010	
Nenê	Brazil	Cagliari*	Catania	3–0	12 December 2010	
Edinson Cavani	Uruguay	Napoli*	Juventus	3–0	9 January 2011	
Alexis Sánchez^{4}	Chile	Udinese	Palermo*	7–0	27 February 2011	
Antonio Di Natale	Italy	Udinese	Palermo*	7–0	27 February 2011	
Edinson Cavani	Uruguay	Napoli*	Sampdoria	4–0	30 January 2011	
Edinson Cavani	Uruguay	Napoli*	Lazio	4–3	3 April 2011	
Francesco Grandolfo	Italy	Bari	Bologna*	4–0	22 May 2011	
Edinson Cavani	Uruguay	Napoli*	Milan	3–1	18 September 2011	
Kevin-Prince Boateng^{†}	Ghana	Milan	Lecce*	4–3	23 October 2011	
Antonio Nocerino	Italy	Milan*	Parma	4–1	26 October 2011	
Diego Milito^{4}	Argentina	Internazionale*	Palermo	4–4	1 February 2012	
Fabrizio Miccoli	Italy	Palermo	Internazionale*	4–4	1 February 2012	
Germán Denis	Argentina	Atalanta*	Roma*	4–1	26 February 2012	
Zlatan Ibrahimović	Sweden	Milan	Palermo*	4–0	3 March 2012	
Joaquín Larrivey	Argentina	Cagliari	Napoli*	3–6	9 March 2012	
Mauricio Pinilla	Chile	Cagliari*	Cesena	3–0	18 March 2012	
Diego Milito	Argentina	Internazionale*	Genoa	5–3	1 April 2012	
Diego Milito	Argentina	Internazionale*	Milan	4–2	6 May 2012	
Fabrizio Miccoli	Italy	Palermo*	Chievo	4–4	6 May 2012	
Marco Rigoni	Italy	Novara*	Cesena	3–0	6 May 2012	
Giampaolo Pazzini	Italy	Milan	Bologna*	3–1	1 September 2012	
Edinson Cavani	Uruguay	Napoli*	Lazio	3–0	26 September 2012	
Fabrizio Miccoli	Italy	Palermo*	Chievo	4–1	30 September 2012	
Fabio Quagliarella	Italy	Juventus	Pescara*	6–1	10 November 2012	
Alberto Paloschi	Italy	Chievo	Genoa*	4–2	2 December 2012	
Edinson Cavani	Uruguay	Napoli*	Roma	4–1	6 January 2013	
Mauro Icardi^{4}	Argentina	Sampdoria*	Pescara	6–0	27 January 2013	
Amauri	Italy	Parma*	Torino	4–1	10 March 2013	
Victor Ibarbo	Colombia	Cagliari*	Sampdoria	3–1	10 March 2013	
Blerim Džemaili	Switzerland	Napoli	Torino*	5–3	30 March 2013	
Germán Denis	Argentina	Atalanta	Internazionale*	4–3	7 April 2013	
Dani Osvaldo	Italy	Roma*	Siena	4–0	28 April 2013	
Miroslav Klose^{5}	Germany	Lazio*	Bologna	6–0	5 May 2013	
Edinson Cavani	Uruguay	Napoli*	Internazionale	3–1	5 May 2013	
Gonzalo Bergessio	Argentina	Catania*	Siena	3–0	5 May 2013	
Adem Ljajić	Serbia	Fiorentina	Pescara*	5–1	19 May 2013	
Giuseppe Rossi	Italy	Fiorentina*	Juventus	4–2	20 October 2013	
Domenico Berardi	Italy	Sassuolo*	Sampdoria	4–3	3 November 2013	
Carlos Tevez	Argentina	Juventus*	Sassuolo	4–0	15 December 2013	
Domenico Berardi^{4}	Italy	Sassuolo*	Milan	4–3	12 January 2014	
Alberto Aquilani	Italy	Fiorentina*	Genoa	3–3	26 January 2014	
Ciro Immobile	Italy	Torino*	Livorno	3–1	22 March 2014	
Mattia Destro	Italy	Roma	Cagliari*	3–1	6 April 2014	
Alberto Paloschi	Italy	Chievo	Livorno*	4–2	13 April 2014	
Gonzalo Higuaín	Argentina	Napoli*	Lazio	4–2	13 April 2014	
Domenico Berardi	Italy	Sassuolo	Fiorentina*	4–3	6 May 2014	
Antonio Di Natale	Italy	Udinese*	Sampdoria	3–3	17 May 2014	
Mauro Icardi	Argentina	Internazionale*	Sassuolo	7–0	14 September 2014	
Albin Ekdal	Sweden	Cagliari	Internazionale*	4–1	28 September 2014	
Filip Đorđević	Serbia	Lazio*	Palermo	4–0	29 September 2014	
Gonzalo Higuaín	Argentina	Napoli*	Hellas Verona	6–2	26 October 2014	
Fabio Quagliarella	Italy	Torino*	Sampdoria	5–1	1 February 2015	
Domenico Berardi	Italy	Sassuolo*	Milan	3–2	17 May 2015	
Nikola Kalinić	Croatia	Fiorentina	Internazionale*	4–1	27 September 2015	
Suso	Spain	Genoa*	Frosinone	4–0	3 April 2016	
Dries Mertens	Belgium	Napoli	Bologna*	6–0	19 April 2016	
Gonzalo Higuaín	Argentina	Napoli	Frosinone*	4–0	14 May 2016	
Carlos Bacca	Colombia	Milan*	Torino	3–2	21 August 2016	
Andrea Belotti	Italy	Torino*	Bologna	5–1	28 August 2016	
Nikola Kalinić	Croatia	Fiorentina	Cagliari*	5–3	23 October 2016	
Mohamed Salah	Egypt	Roma*	Bologna	3–0	6 November 2016	
Dries Mertens	Belgium	Napoli	Cagliari*	5–0	11 December 2016	
Dries Mertens^{4}	Belgium	Napoli*	Torino	5–3	18 December 2016	
Diego Falcinelli	Italy	Crotone*	Empoli	5–0	29 January 2017	
Marek Hamšík	Slovakia	Napoli	Bologna*	7–1	4 February 2017	
Dries Mertens	Belgium	Napoli	Bologna*	7–1	4 February 2017	
Marco Parolo^{4}	Italy	Lazio	Pescara*	6–2	5 February 2017	
Roberto Inglese	Italy	Chievo	Sassuolo*	3–1	12 February 2017	
Andrea Belotti	Italy	Torino*	Palermo	3–1	5 March 2017	
Mauro Icardi	Argentina	Internazionale*	Atalanta	7–1	12 March 2017	
Éver Banega	Argentina	Internazionale*	Atalanta	7–1	12 March 2017	
Alejandro Gómez	Argentina	Atalanta*	Genoa	5–0	2 April 2017	
Mauro Icardi	Argentina	Internazionale	Fiorentina*	4–5	22 April 2017	
Keita Baldé	Senegal	Lazio*	Palermo	6–2	23 April 2017	
Grégoire Defrel	France	Sassuolo	Torino*	3–5	28 May 2017	
Paulo Dybala	Argentina	Juventus	Genoa*	4–2	26 August 2017	
Ciro Immobile	Italy	Lazio*	Milan	4–1	10 September 2017	
Paulo Dybala	Argentina	Juventus	Sassuolo*	3–1	17 September 2017	
Dries Mertens	Belgium	Napoli*	Benevento	6–0	17 September 2017	
Mauro Icardi	Argentina	Internazionale*	Milan	3–2	15 October 2017	
Sami Khedira	Germany	Juventus	Udinese*	6–2	22 October 2017	
Ivan Perišić	Croatia	Internazionale*	Chievo	5–0	3 December 2017	
Ciro Immobile^{4}	Italy	Lazio	SPAL*	5–2	6 January 2018	
Fabio Quagliarella	Italy	Sampdoria*	Fiorentina	3–1	21 January 2018	
Gonzalo Higuaín	Argentina	Juventus*	Sassuolo	7–0	4 February 2018	
Mauro Icardi^{4}	Argentina	Internazionale	Sampdoria*	5–0	18 March 2018	
Josip Iličić	Slovenia	Atalanta	Hellas Verona*	5–0	18 March 2018	
Andrea Belotti	Italy	Torino*	Crotone	4–1	4 April 2018	
Paulo Dybala	Argentina	Juventus	Benevento*	4–2	7 April 2018	
Jordan Veretout	France	Fiorentina*	Lazio	3–4	18 April 2018	
Giovanni Simeone	Argentina	Fiorentina*	Napoli	3–0	29 April 2018	
Josip Iličić	Slovenia	Atalanta	Chievo*	5–1	21 October 2018	
Dries Mertens	Belgium	Napoli*	Empoli	5–1	2 November 2018	
Duván Zapata	Colombia	Atalanta	Udinese*	3–1	9 December 2018	
Josip Iličić^{†}	Slovenia	Atalanta	Sassuolo*	6–2	29 December 2018	
Duván Zapata^{4}	Colombia	Atalanta	Frosinone*	5–0	20 January 2019	
Domenico Berardi	Italy	Sassuolo*	Sampdoria	4–1	1 September 2019	
Andreas Cornelius^{†}	Denmark	Parma*	Genoa	5–1	20 October 2019	
Luis Muriel	Colombia	Atalanta*	Udinese	7–1	27 October 2019	
Cristiano Ronaldo	Portugal	Juventus*	Cagliari	4–0	6 January 2020	
Ciro Immobile	Italy	Lazio*	Sampdoria	5–1	18 January 2020	
Josip Iličić	Slovenia	Atalanta	Torino*	7–0	25 January 2020	
Duván Zapata	Colombia	Atalanta	Lecce*	7–2	1 March 2020	
Andreas Cornelius	Denmark	Parma	Genoa*	4–1	23 June 2020	
Mario Pašalić	Croatia	Atalanta*	Brescia	6–2	14 July 2020	
Ciro Immobile	Italy	Lazio	Hellas Verona*	5–1	26 July 2020	
Federico Chiesa	Italy	Fiorentina*	Bologna	4–0	29 July 2020	
Henrikh Mkhitaryan	Armenia	Roma	Genoa*	3–1	8 November 2020	
Lautaro Martínez	Argentina	Internazionale*	Crotone	6–2	3 January 2021	
Dušan Vlahović	Serbia	Fiorentina	Benevento*	4–1	13 March 2021	
Cristiano Ronaldo	Portugal	Juventus	Cagliari*	3–1	14 March 2021	
Rodrigo Palacio	Argentina	Bologna*	Fiorentina	3–3	2 May 2021	
Ante Rebić	Croatia	Milan	Torino*	7–0	12 May 2021	
Ciro Immobile	Italy	Lazio*	Spezia	6–1	28 August 2021	
Giovanni Simeone^{4}	Argentina	Hellas Verona*	Lazio	4–1	24 October 2021	
Dušan Vlahović	Serbia	Fiorentina*	Spezia	3–0	31 October 2021	
Mario Pašalić	Croatia	Atalanta*	Venezia	4–0	30 November 2021	
Antonín Barák	Czech Republic	Hellas Verona	Sassuolo*	4–2	16 January 2022	
Giovanni Simeone	Argentina	Hellas Verona*	Venezia	3–1	27 February 2022	
Lautaro Martínez	Argentina	Internazionale*	Salernitana	5–0	4 March 2022	
Beto	Guinea-Bissau	Udinese*	Cagliari	5–1	3 April 2022	
Ciro Immobile	Italy	Lazio	Genoa*	4–1	10 April 2022	
Andrea Belotti^{†}	Italy	Torino	Empoli*	3–1	1 May 2022	
Teun Koopmeiners	Netherlands	Atalanta*	Torino	3–1	1 September 2022	
Victor Osimhen	Nigeria	Napoli*	Sassuolo	4–0	29 October 2022	
Boulaye Dia	Senegal	Salernitana*	Fiorentina	3–3	3 May 2023	
Olivier Giroud	France	Milan*	Sampdoria	5–1	20 May 2023	
Teun Koopmeiners	Netherlands	Atalanta*	Monza	5–2	4 June 2023	
Lautaro Martínez^{4†}	Argentina	Internazionale	Salernitana*	4–0	30 September 2023	
Riccardo Orsolini	Italy	Bologna*	Empoli	3–0	1 October 2023	
Szymon Żurkowski	Poland	Empoli*	Monza	3–0	24 January 2024	
Paulo Dybala	Argentina	Roma*	Torino	3–2	26 February 2024	
Victor Osimhen	Nigeria	Napoli	Sassuolo*	6–1	28 February 2024	
Mateo Retegui	Italy	Atalanta*	Genoa	5–1	5 October 2024	
Marcus Thuram	France	Internazionale*	Torino	3–2	5 October 2024	
Moise Kean	Italy	Fiorentina*	Hellas Verona	3–1	10 November 2024	
Mateo Retegui^{4}	Italy	Atalanta	Hellas Verona*	5–0	8 February 2025	
Donyell Malen	Netherlands	Roma*	Pisa	3–0	10 April 2026	
Donyell Malen	Netherlands	Roma*	Fiorentina	4–0	24 August 2026	
Franco Mastantuono	Argentina	Fiorentina	Venezia*	4–2	11 September 2026	
Antonio Raimondo	Italy	Frosinone*	Sassuolo	4–2	16 October 2026	
Samuel Mbangula	Belgium	Bologna	AC Milan*	4–2	28 October 2026	
Donyell Malen^{4}	Netherlands	Roma	Parma*	5–1	21 November 2026	
Pio Esposito	Italy	Inter Milan	Atalanta*	4–4	22 November 2026	

== Multiple hat-tricks ==
The following table lists the minimum number of hat-tricks scored by players who have scored two or more hat-tricks.

Players in bold are still active in Serie A. Players in italics are still active outside the Serie A.

Rank	Player	Hat-tricks	Last hat-trick
1	(Sweden) Gunnar Nordahl	17	12 June 1955
2	(Italy) Giuseppe Meazza	15	16 January 1938
3	(Sweden) Kurt Hamrin	12	5 February 1967
3	(Hungary) István Nyers	12	6 February 1955
5	(Italy) Filippo Inzaghi	10	19 April 2009
5	(Italy) Silvio Piola	10	19 November 1950
7	(Italy) Adriano Bassetto	9	29 January 1956
7	(Italy) Giuseppe Signori	9	27 May 2001
7	(Italy) Omar Sívori	9	27 January 1963
10	(Italy) Amedeo Amadei	8	6 November 1949
10	(Italy) Roberto Baggio	8	30 September 2001
10	(Italy) Giampiero Boniperti	8	20 October 1953
10	(Argentina) Hernán Crespo	8	13 May 2007
10	(Netherlands) Marco van Basten	8	8 November 1992
15	(Argentina) Abel Balbo	7	10 January 1999
15	(Uruguay) Edinson Cavani	7	5 May 2013
15	(Italy) Antonio Di Natale	7	17 May 2014
15	(Italy) Eddie Firmani	7	5 March 1961
15	(Italy) Ciro Immobile	7	10 April 2022
15	(Italy) Vincenzo Montella	7	19 September 2004
15	(Italy) Pierino Prati	7	11 May 1975
22	(Italy) José Altafini	6	5 February 1967
22	(Argentina) Gabriel Batistuta	6	5 November 2000
22	(Italy) Sergio Brighenti	6	14 January 1962
22	(Italy) Guglielmo Gabetto	6	11 April 1948
22	(Argentina) Mauro Icardi	6	18 March 2018
22	(Italy) Marco Di Vaio	6	8 March 2009
22	(Belgium) Dries Mertens	6	2 November 2018
22	(Denmark) Harald Nielsen	6	8 December 1963
22	(Italy) Gino Pivatelli	6	1 May 1960
22	(Italy) Paolino Pulici	6	21 January 1979
32	(Italy) Alessandro Altobelli	5	5 October 1986
32	(Italy) **Domenico Berardi**	5	1 September 2019
32	(Italy) Renzo Burini	5	3 May 1953
32	(Wales) John Charles	5	21 February 1960
32	(Italy) Pedro Manfredini	5	22 September 1963
32	(Italy) Valentino Mazzola	5	5 October 1947
32	(Argentina) Diego Milito	5	6 May 2012
32	(France) David Trezeguet	5	31 October 2007
40	(Italy) Pietro Anastasi	4	27 April 1975
40	(Italy) Antonio Angelillo	4	11 October 1964
40	(Italy) Andrea Belotti	4	1 May 2022
40	(Italy) Roberto Boninsegna	4	6 October 1974
40	(Italy) Marco Branca	4	14 April 1996
40	(Italy) Alessandro Del Piero	4	20 April 2008
40	(Argentina) **Paulo Dybala**	4	26 February 2024
40	(Argentina) Gonzalo Higuaín	4	4 February 2018
40	(Slovenia) Josip Iličić	4	25 January 2020
40	(Italy) Cristiano Lucarelli	4	1 May 2005
40	(Italy) Fabrizio Miccoli	4	30 September 2012
40	(Italy) Giuseppe Savoldi	4	18 September 1977
40	(Italy) Christian Vieri	4	26 January 2003
40	(Italy) Pietro Paolo Virdis	4	9 October 1988
54	(Italy) Pierluigi Casiraghi	3	5 March 1995
54	(Italy) Enrico Chiesa	3	20 September 2003
54	(Argentina) Germán Denis	3	7 April 2013
54	(Italy) Alberto Galassi	3	2 October 1949
54	(Italy) Carlo Galli	3	13 April 1958
54	(Italy) Francesco Graziani	3	12 November 1978
54	(Denmark) John Hansen	3	10 February 1952
54	(Sweden) Hasse Jeppson	3	27 September 1953
54	(Netherlands) **Donyell Malen**	3	21 November 2026
54	(Argentina) **Lautaro Martínez**	3	30 September 2023
54	(Italy) Sandro Mazzola	3	18 September 1966
54	(Denmark) Poul Rasmussen	3	17 April 1955
54	(Italy) Carlo Reguzzoni	3	14 June 1931
54	(Italy) Gino Rossetti	3	12 March 1933
54	(Italy) Roberto Pruzzo	3	16 February 1986
54	(Italy) Fabio Quagliarella	3	21 January 2018
54	(Italy) Angelo Schiavio	3	22 January 1933
54	(Argentina) **Giovanni Simeone**	3	27 February 2022
54	(Brazil) Luís Vinício	3	3 November 1963
54	(Italy) Pasquale Vivolo	3	23 November 1952
54	(Italy) Rodolfo Volk	3	6 July 1930
54	(Colombia) **Duván Zapata**	3	1 March 2020
76	(Brazil) Adriano	2	28 August 2005
76	(Italy) Massimo Agostini	2	23 May 1993
76	(Uruguay) Carlos Aguilera	2	9 May 1993
76	(Italy) Francesco Baiano	2	18 April 1992
76	(Italy) Carlo Barbieri	2	15 April 1948
76	(Italy) Roberto Bettega	2	13 September 1981
76	(Germany) Oliver Bierhoff	2	24 May 2003
76	(Italy) Marco Borriello	2	24 February 2008
76	(Argentina) Néstor Combin	2	22 October 1967
76	(Denmark) Andreas Cornelius	2	23 June 2020
76	(Italy) David Di Michele	2	15 October 2005
76	(Italy) Alberto Gilardino	2	1 May 2005
76	(Italy) Enrique Guaita	2	26 April 1934
76	(Denmark) Karl Aage Hansen	2	1 January 1950
76	(Italy) Dario Hübner	2	11 February 2001
76	(Sweden) Zlatan Ibrahimović	2	3 March 2012
76	(Brazil) Kaká	2	20 April 2008
76	(Croatia) Nikola Kalinić	2	23 October 2016
76	(Germany) Jürgen Klinsmann	2	9 September 1990
76	(Austria) Engelbert König	2	17 March 1946
76	(Netherlands) **Teun Koopmeiners**	2	4 June 2023
76	(Italy) Roberto Mancini	2	4 January 1997
76	(Italy) Alberto Marchetti	2	25 April 1943
76	(Italy) Aurelio Milani	2	21 January 1962
76	(Italy) Giacomo Neri	2	27 April 1941
76	(Nigeria) Victor Osimhen	2	28 February 2024
76	(Italy) Alberto Paloschi	2	13 April 2014
76	(Croatia) **Mario Pašalić**	2	30 November 2021
76	(Italy) Ezio Pascutti	2	10 April 1966
76	(Italy) Giampaolo Pazzini	2	1 September 2012
76	(Italy) Igor Protti	2	20 April 1997
76	(Italy) Ettore Puricelli	2	4 January 1948
76	(Italy) Bruno Quaresima	2	30 November 1947
76	(Italy) Mateo Retegui	2	8 February 2025
76	(Italy) Gigi Riva	2	6 October 1968
76	(Italy) Tommaso Rocchi	2	1 May 2005
76	(Portugal) Cristiano Ronaldo	2	14 March 2021
76	(Italy) Paolo Rossi	2	4 March 1979
76	(Ukraine) Andriy Shevchenko	2	30 January 2000
76	(Denmark) Jørgen Leschly Sørensen	2	10 January 1954
76	(Italy) Carlo Stradella	2	1 January 1948
76	(Italy) Luca Toni	2	22 October 2005
76	(Italy) Francesco Totti	2	22 November 2009
76	(Italy) Giovanni Vecchina	2	8 March 1931
76	(Serbia) Dušan Vlahović	2	31 October 2021
76	(Italy) Luigi Ziroli	2	22 December 1929
