= 1942–43 AC Torino season =

Associazione Calcio Torino
1942-43 season
- Chairman: Ferruccio Novo
- Manager: András Kuttik; Antonio Janni
- Stadium: Stadio Filadelfia
- Serie A: 1st
- Coppa Italia: Winners
- Top goalscorer: League: Gabetto (14); All: Gabetto (18)
| Home colours | Away colours |

During the 1942–43 season Associazione Calcio Torino competed in Serie A and Coppa.

== Summary ==
At the start of the 1942–43 season, under Hungarian manager András Kuttik, Torino's squad, of whom some were starters for the Italian national team; goalkeepers Bodoira and Cavalli; defenders such as Ferrini, Ellena, Piacentini and Cassano; in midfield Baldi and Gallea, with the new Ezio Loik and Mazzola; forward Menti and Ferraris II, and Gabetto and Ossola.

On paper, Torino were considered favourites for the title, but they faced competition from Livorno. The championship was decided on the final matchday, when Torino secured the title with a goal from Mazzola against Bari.

Torino also managed to win the Coppa Italia against their "terrible" Venezia of the year before and became the first team to hit the "double". The game was played in Milan and the Granata, thanks to a brace from Gabetto and goals from Mazzola and Ferraris II, secured the win with a resounding 4–0.

== Squad ==
Note: Flags indicate national team as defined under FIFA eligibility rules; some limited exceptions apply. Players may hold more than one non-FIFA nationality.

| Pos. | Nation | Player |
|---|---|---|
| GK | ITA | Alfredo Bodoira |
| GK | ITA | Filippo Cavalli |
| DF | ITA | Luigi Cassano |
| DF | ITA | Osvaldo Ferrini (Captain) |
| DF | ITA | Sergio Piacentini |
| DF | ITA | Fioravante Baldi III (vice-Captain) |
| MF | ITA | Giacinto Ellena |
| MF | ITA | Cesare Gallea |

| Pos. | Nation | Player |
|---|---|---|
| MF | ITA | Giuseppe Grezar |
| MF | ITA | Ezio Loik |
| FW | ITA | Pietro Ferraris II |
| FW | ITA | Guglielmo Gabetto |
| FW | ITA | Valentino Mazzola |
| FW | ITA | Romeo Menti II |
| FW | ITA | Franco Ossola |

=== Transfers ===
In
| Pos. | Name | from | Type |
|---|---|---|---|
| DF | Luigi Cassano | Napoli | |
| MF | Giuseppe Grezar | Triestina | £450 000 |
| MF | Ezio Loik | Venezia | £600 000 |
| FW | Valentino Mazzola | Venezia | £600 000 |

Out
| Pos. | Name | To | Type |
|---|---|---|---|
| GK | Aldo Olivieri | Brescia | |
| DF | Livio Bussi | Vicenza | |
| MF | Bruno Baruzzi | Bari | |
| MF | Aldo Cadario | Brescia | |
| MF | Walter Petron | Venezia | |
| MF | Enrico Santià | Padova | |
| FW | Felice Borel | Juventus Cisitalia | |
| FW | Raúl Mezzadra | Venezia | |
| FW | Oberdan Ussello | Biellese | |

== Competitions ==
=== Serie A ===
==== League table ====
| Pos | Team | Pld | W | D | L | GF | GA | GD | Pts |
|---|---|---|---|---|---|---|---|---|---|
| 1 | Torino (C) | 30 | 20 | 4 | 6 | 68 | 31 | +37 | 44 |
| 2 | Livorno | 30 | 18 | 7 | 5 | 52 | 34 | +18 | 43 |
| 3 | Juventus Cisitalia | 30 | 16 | 5 | 9 | 75 | 55 | +20 | 37 |
| 4 | Ambrosiana-Inter | 30 | 15 | 4 | 11 | 53 | 38 | +15 | 34 |
| 5 | Genova 1893 | 30 | 14 | 5 | 11 | 59 | 53 | +6 | 33 |

Source: Relegations to canceled 1943–44 tournaments would have been canceled themselves after the war.
(C) Champions

==== Matches ====
Win Draw Loss

| 4 October 1942 1 | Ambrosiana-Inter | 1–0 | Torino | Milan |
| 15:00 UTC+1 | Demaria 60' | | | Stadium: Arena Civica; Referee: Giuseppe Zelocchi |

| 11 October 1942 2 | Torino | 1–2 | Livorno | Turin |
| 15:00 UTC+1 | Loik 39' | | 51' Zidarich; 69' Degano | Stadium: Stadio Filadelfia; Attendance: 15,000; Referee: Aldo Donati |

| 18 October 1942 3 | Juventus Cisitalia | 2–5 | Torino | Turin |
| 15:00 UTC+1 | Bellini 79'; Sentimenti III 90' (pen.) | | 24' Ferraris II; 29', 52' Menti II; 61' Loik; 82' Mazzola | Stadium: Stadio Mussolini; Attendance: 32,600; Referee: Rinaldo Barlassina |

| 25 October 1942 4 | Torino | 3–1 | Genova 1893 | Turin |
| 15:00 UTC+1 | Ferraris II 17'; Gabetto 69'; Mazzola 74' | | 55' Trevisan | Stadium: Stadio Filadelfia; Attendance: 25,000; Referee: Achille Pizziolo |

| 1 November 1942 5 | Roma | 0–4 | Torino | Rome |
| 14:30 UTC+1 | | | 13' Gabetto; 14', 35' (pen.) Menti II; 32' Ferraris II | Stadium: Stadio Nazionale del PNF; Referee: Rinaldo Barlassina |

| 8 November 1942 6 | Torino | 5–0 | Fiorentina | Turin |
| 14:30 UTC+1 | Ferraris II 5', 14', 82'; Mazzola 20'; Gabetto 37' | | | Stadium: Stadio Filadelfia; Referee: Giuseppe Zelocchi |

| 15 November 1942 7 | Vicenza | 0–1 | Torino | Vicenza |
| 14:30 UTC+1 | | | 39' Grezar | Stadium: Campo Sportivo del Littorio; Referee: Raffaele Scorzoni |

| 22 November 1942 8 | Torino | 0–1 | Milano | Turin |
| 14:30 UTC+1 | | | 16' Morselli | Stadium: Stadio Filadelfia; Referee: Giuseppe Fois |

| 29 November 1942 9 | Venezia | 0–3 | Torino | Venice |
| 14:30 UTC+1 | | | 2' Gabetto; 48' Loik; 81' Mazzola | Stadium: Stadio Pier Luigi Penzo; Referee: Renzo Curradi |

| 6 December 1942 10 | Torino | 4–1 | Triestina | Turin |
| 14:30 UTC+1 | Ballarin 20' (pen.); Ferraris II 32'; Loik 53'; Gabetto 58' | | 71' Tosolini | Stadium: Stadio Filadelfia; Referee: Mario Scotto |

| 13 December 1942 11 | Torino | 3–0 | Liguria | Turin |
| 14:30 UTC+1 | Grezar 16'; Menti II 37'; Loik 62' | | | Stadium: Stadio Filadelfia; Referee: Achille Pizziolo |

| 20 December 1942 12 | Atalanta | 1–0 | Torino | Bergamo |
| 14:30 UTC+1 | Cassani 47' | | | Stadium: Stadio Mario Brumana; Referee: Generoso Dattilo |

| 27 December 1942 13 | Torino | 2–2 | S.S. Lazio | Turin |
| 14:30 UTC+1 | Monza 4' (o.g.); Grezar 55' (pen.) | | 39' Koenig; 89' Pisa I | Stadium: Stadio Filadelfia; Attendance: 5,000; Referee: Giuseppe Zelocchi |

| 3 January 1943 14 | Bologna | 1–2 | Torino | Bologna |
| 14:30 UTC+1 | Ferrini 55' (o.g.) | | 6' Menti II; 61' Gabetto | Stadium: Stadio Littoriale; Referee: Achille Pizziolo |

| 10 January 1943 15 | Torino | 3–0 | Bari | Turin |
| 14:30 UTC+1 | Gabetto 63', 74'; Mazzola 69' | | | Stadium: Stadio Filadelfia; Referee: Oreste Dellarole |

| 17 January 1943 16 | Torino | 1–3 | Ambrosiana-Inter | Turin |
| 14:30 UTC+1 | Menti II 57' | | 33', 73' Gaddoni; 80' Rebuzzi | Stadium: Stadio Filadelfia; Attendance: 17,000; Referee: Giovanni Galeati |

| 24 January 1943 17 | Livorno | 0–0 | Torino | Livorno |
| 14:30 UTC+1 | | | | Stadium: Stadio Edda Ciano Mussolini; Attendance: 20,000; Referee: Raffaele Scorzoni |

| 31 January 1943 18 | Torino | 2–0 | Juventus Cisitalia | Turin |
| 14:30 UTC+1 | Piacentini 25'; Ferraris II 40' | | | Stadium: Stadio Filadelfia; Referee: Generoso Dattilo |

| 7 February 1943 19 | Genova 1893 | 3–3 | Torino | Genova |
| 15:00 UTC+1 | Trevisan 17', 31' (pen.); Neri II 65' | | 4' Ferraris II; 52' Loik; 68' Gabetto | Stadium: Stadio Luigi Ferraris; Attendance: 11,000; Referee: Achille Pizziolo |

| 14 February 1943 20 | Torino | 4–0 | Roma | Turin |
| 15:00 UTC+1 | Menti II 5'; Ossola 31', 56'; Mazzola 79' | | | Stadium: Stadio Filadelfia; Attendance: 19,600; Referee: Mario Scotto |

| 21 February 1943 21 | Fiorentina | 2–3 | Torino | Firenze |
| 15:00 UTC+1 | Valcareggi 48'; Michelini 71' | | 14', 36' Mazzola; 83' Ferraris II | Stadium: Stadio Giovanni Berta; Referee: Giuseppe Zelocchi |

| 28 February 1943 22 | Torino | 0–0 | Vicenza | Turin |
| 15:00 UTC+1 | | | | Stadium: Stadio Filadelfia; Referee: Giuseppe Carpani |

| 7 March 1943 23 | Milano | 1–0 | Torino | Milan |
| 15:00 UTC+1 | Cappello 46' | | | Stadium: Stadio San Siro; Referee: Raffaele Scorzoni |

| 14 March 1943 24 | Torino | 3–1 | Venezia | Turin |
| 15:00 UTC+1 | Stefanini 15' (o.g.); Gabetto 24'; Arienti 36' (o.g.) | | 64' (o.g.) Gallea | Stadium: Stadio Filadelfia; Referee: Umberto Biancone |

| 21 March 1943 25 | Triestina | 2–3 | Torino | Trieste |
| 15:30 UTC+1 | De Lazzari 44'; Cergoli 87' | | 33', 62', 50' Ossola | Stadium: Stadio Littorio; Referee: Giuseppe Zelocchi |

| 28 March 1943 26 | Liguria | 2–3 | Torino | Genoa |
| 15:30 UTC+1 | Diotallevi 5'; D'Alconzo 49' | | 3' Ferraris II; 30' Loik; 56' Gabetto | Stadium: Stadio del Littorio; Referee: Generoso Dattilo |

| 4 April 1943 27 | Torino | 4–2 | Atalanta | Turin |
| 15:30 UTC+1 | Gabetto 18'; Ferraris II 64'; Loik 70'; Mazzola 83' | | 19' Zandali; 60' Gritti | Stadium: Stadio Filadelfia; Attendance: 12 000; Referee: Giuseppe Fois |

| 11 April 1943 28 | Lazio | 2–3 | Torino | Rome |
| 15:30 UTC+1 | Romagnoli 10'; Gualtieri 62' | | 28' Gabetto; 32' Loik; 58' Mazzola | Stadium: Stadio Nazionale del PNF; Referee: Aniello Mazza |

| 18 April 1943 29 | Torino | 2–1 | Bologna | Turin |
| 15:30 UTC+1 | Gabetto 24'; Ossola 64' | | 34' Sansone | Stadium: Stadio Filadelfia; Referee: Generoso Dattilo |

| 25 April 1943 30 | Bari | 0–1 | Torino | Bari |
| 15:30 UTC+1 | | | 86' Mazzola | Stadium: Stadio della Vittoria; Referee: Achille Pizziolo |

=== Coppa Italia ===
==== Round of 32 ====
| 20 September 1942 Gara unica | Torino | 7–0 | Anconitana-Bianchi | Turin |
| 15:30 UTC+1 | Baldi III 4'; Mazzola 15', 71'; Gabetto 39', 57', 55'; Brandimarte 62' (o.g.) | | | Stadium: Stadio Filadelfia; Referee: Lorenzo Limido |

==== Eightfinals ====
| 27 September 1942 | Atalanta | 0–2 | Torino | Bergamo |
| 15:30 UTC+1 | | | 32' Gabetto; 41' Loik | Stadium: Stadio Mario Brumana; Referee: Giorgio Bernardi |

==== Quarterfinals ====
| 16 May 1943 | Torino | 5–0 | Milano | Turin |
| 16:00 UTC+1 | Mazzola 47', 82'; Pozzi 52' (o.g.); Ossola 73'; Ferraris II 78' | | | Stadium: Stadio Filadelfia; Referee: Giuseppe Zelocchi |

==== Semifinals ====
| 23 May 1943 | Torino | 2–0 | Roma | Turin |
| 16:00 UTC+1 | | | | Stadium: Stadio Filadelfia; Referee: Achille Pizziolo |

==== Final ====
| 30 May 1943 | Torino | 4–0 | Venezia | Milan |
| 16:00 UTC+1 | Ossola 22', 48'; Ferraris II 46'; Mazzola 52' | | | Stadium: Stadio San Siro; Referee: Giuseppe Zelocchi |

== Statistics ==
=== Squad statistics ===
| Competition | Points | Home | | | | | | Away | | | | | | Total | | | | | | GD |
| Competition | Points | G | V | D | L | Gs | Ga | G | V | D | L | Gs | Ga | G | V | D | L | Gs | Ga | GD |
|---|---|---|---|---|---|---|---|---|---|---|---|---|---|---|---|---|---|---|---|---|
| Serie A | 44 | 15 | 10 | 2 | 3 | 37 | 14 | 15 | 10 | 2 | 3 | 31 | 17 | 30 | 20 | 4 | 6 | 68 | 31 | +37 |
| Coppa Italia | - | 3 | 3 | 0 | 0 | 14 | 0 | 2 | 2 | 0 | 0 | 6 | 0 | 5 | 5 | 0 | 0 | 20 | 0 | +20 |
| Total | - | 18 | 13 | 2 | 3 | 51 | 14 | 17 | 12 | 2 | 3 | 37 | 17 | 35 | 25 | 4 | 6 | 88 | 31 | +57 |

=== Players statistics ===
==== Appearances ====
- 18. (Italy) Fioravante Baldi
- 20. (Italy) Alfredo Bodoira
- 17. (Italy) Luigi Cassano
- 15. (Italy) Filippo Cavalli
- 32. (Italy) Giacinto Ellena
- 35. (Italy) Pietro Ferraris
- 26. (Italy) Osvaldo Ferrini
- 31. (Italy) Guglielmo Gabetto
- 20. (Italy) Cesare Gallea
- 35. (Italy) Giuseppe Grezar
- 35. (Italy) Ezio Loik
- 35. (Italy) Valentino Mazzola
- 23. (Italy) Romeo Menti
- 16. (Italy) Franco Ossola
- 27. (Italy) Sergio Piacentini

==== Goalscorers ====
- 18. (Italy) Guglielmo Gabetto
- 16. (Italy) Valentino Mazzola
- 14. (Italy) Pietro Ferraris
- 10. (Italy) Ezio Loik
- 9. (Italy) Franco Ossola
- 8. (Italy) Romeo Menti
- 1. (Italy) Fioravante Baldi
- 3. (Italy) Giuseppe Grezar
- 1. (Italy) Sergio Piacentini

== See also ==
- Grande Torino
