= Santhia =

Santhia or Santhià may refer to:

== Places ==
- Santhià, an Italian municipality in the Piedmont region
- Santhia Upazila, an administrative area in Bangladesh (formerly Santhia in India)

== People ==
- Enrico Santià (b 1918), an Italian football player
- Giuseppe Santhià, an Italian cyclist and stage winner in the 1911 and 1913 Giro d'Italia
- Ignatius of Santhià (1686–1770), an Italian Roman Catholic priest

== Other uses ==
- Santhiya, the learning of pronunciation of Sikh scriptures
- SS Santhia, a 1901 steamship of the British India Steam Navigation Company
