= Gallea =

Gallea is an Italian surname. Notable people with the surname include:

- Arturo Gallea (1895–1959), Italian cinematographer and producer
- Cesare Gallea (1917–2008), Italian footballer
