= Adriano Bassetto =

Italian footballer (1925–1999)

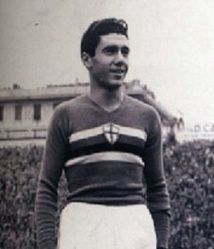
- Bassetto with Sampdoria

Personal information
- Date of birth: 8 September 1925
- Place of birth: Vicenza, Kingdom of Italy
- Date of death: 11 October 1999 (aged 74)
- Place of death: Vicenza, Italy
- Position: Attacking midfielder

Senior career*
Years	Team	Apps	(Gls)
1941–1943	Siena	17	(3)
1944	Vicenza	2	(1)
1945–1946	Vicenza	26	(9)
1946–1953	Sampdoria	196	(92)
1953–1957	Atalanta	125	(56)
1957–1958	Vicenza	8	(1)
1958–1962	Lucchese	100	(28)
1962–1963	Cesena	2	(0)
Total		476	(190)

International career
1954	Italy	3	(0)
- * Club domestic league appearances and goals

Adriano Bassetto (Italian pronunciation: [adriˈaːno basˈsetto]; 8 September 1925 – 11 October 1999) was an Italian footballer who played as an attacking midfielder.

== Career ==
Bassetto was born in Vicenza, Veneto in 1925. An attacking midfielder, he played most of his career with Sampdoria and Atalanta in Serie A between 1946 and 1957. He also played for Siena, Vicenza, Lucchese and Cesena. In total, he scored 149 goals in 329 appearances in Serie A.
