= Bruno Quaresima =

Italian footballer (1920–1999)

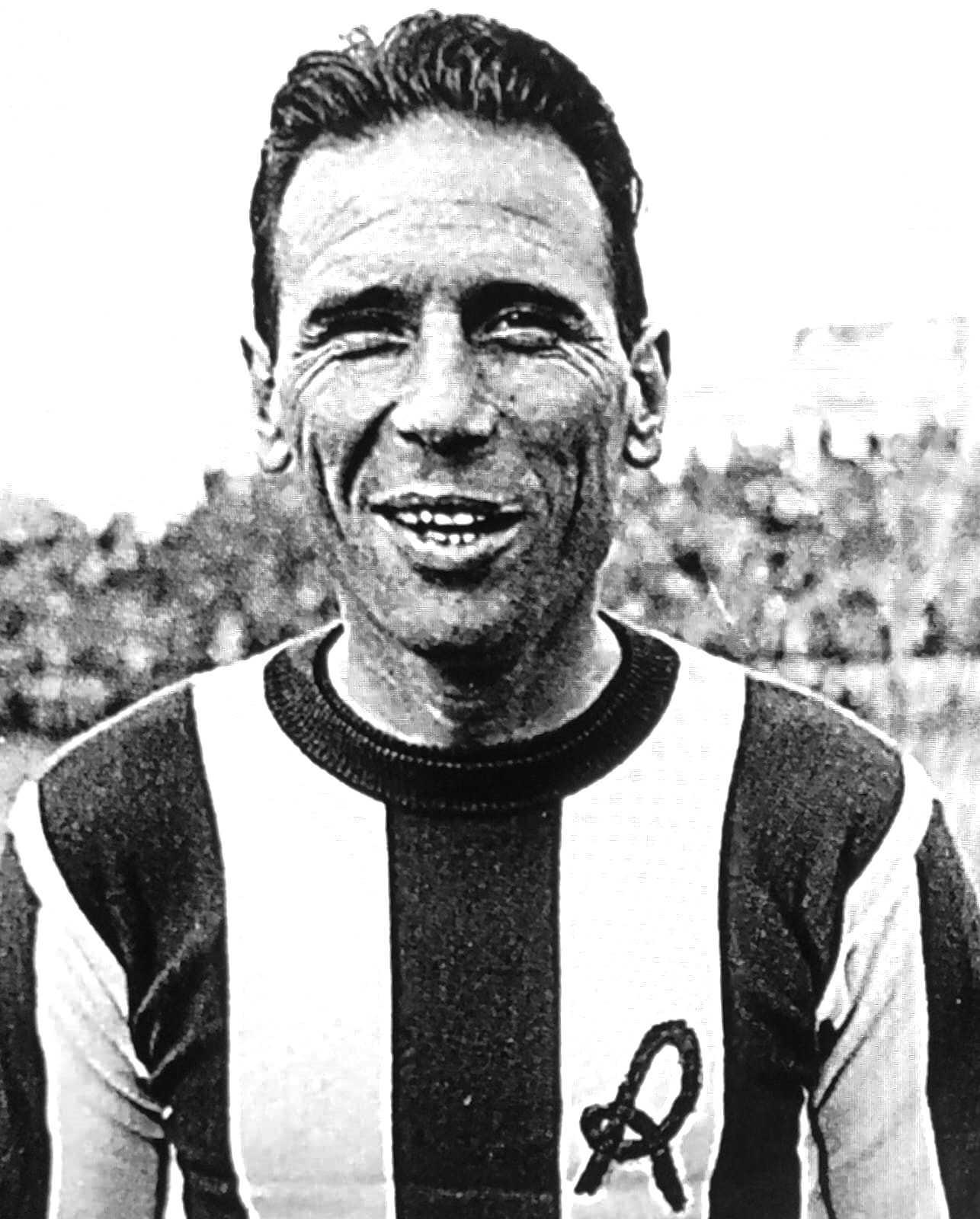

Personal information
- Date of birth: 2 July 1920
- Place of birth: Vicenza, Italy
- Date of death: 26 August 1999 (aged 79)
- Position: Striker

Senior career*
Years	Team	Apps	(Gls)
1938–1939	Vicenza	12	(8)
1939–1941	Fiumana	47	(42)
1941–1947	Vicenza	137	(62)
1947–1948	Internazionale	25	(16)
1948–1951	Vicenza	105	(52)
1951–1952	SPAL	20	(4)
1952–1953	Marzotto Valdagno	29	(6)
1953–1954	Vicenza	12	(2)
1954–1956	Belluno		
1956–1957	Clodia		
- * Club domestic league appearances and goals

Bruno Quaresima (2 July 1920 – 26 August 1999) was an Italian professional football player. He was born in Vicenza.
