= Valerio Cassani =

Italian footballer

Personal information
- Date of birth: 28 February 1922
- Place of birth: Jerago con Orago, Italy
- Date of death: 23 February 1995 (aged 72)
- Place of death: Varese, Italy
- Position: Midfielder

Senior career*
Years	Team	Apps	(Gls)
1939–1940	Milano	0	(0)
1940–1942	Padova	50	(29)
1942–1944	Atalanta	26	(3)
1945–1946	Atalanta	21	(1)
1946–1948	Modena	56	(8)
1948–1949	Livorno	28	(6)
1949–1951	Bari	32	(6)
1952–1953	Genoa	9	(4)
1954–1955	Cavese	14	(0)

International career
1948	Italy	2	(0)
- * Club domestic league appearances and goals

Valerio Cassani (Italian pronunciation: [vaˈlɛːrjo kasˈsaːni]; 28 February 1922 – 23 February 1995) was an Italian professional footballer who played as a midfielder.

== Career ==
Cassani played for 5 seasons (119 games, 20 goals) in the Italian Serie A for Atalanta B.C., Modena F.C., A.S. Livorno Calcio and A.S. Bari. Cassani made his debut for the Italy national football team on 2 August 1948 in the 1948 Summer Olympics, in Italy's game against the United States.
