= Cesare Gallea =

Italian footballer (1917-2008)

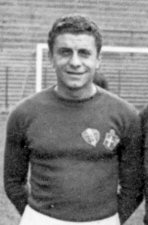

Personal information
- Full name: Cesare Gallea
- Date of birth: 23 September 1917
- Place of birth: Turin, Italy
- Date of death: 11 February 2008 (aged 90)
- Place of death: Turin, Italy
- Position: Midfielder

Senior career*
| Years | Team | Apps | (Gls) |
| 1935–1944 | Torino | 225 | (4) |
| 1922–1923 | Bescia | 50 | (0) |
| 1923–1924 | Alessandria | 50 | (2) |

International career
| 1937 | Italy | 1 | (0) |

Managerial career
- 1949–1950: Carrarese
- 1953: Modena
- 1953–1954: Riunite Messina
- 1954–1955: Fanfulla
- 1955–1956: Lecce
- * Club domestic league appearances and goals

Cesare Gallea (Italian pronunciation: [ˈtʃeːzare ɡalˈlɛːa]; 23 September 1917 – 11 February 2008) was an Italian footballer who played as a midfielder. On 27 May 1937, he represented the Italy national football team on the occasion of a friendly match against Norway in a 3–1 away win.
