= Giacomo Neri =

Italian footballer and coach

Personal information
- Date of birth: 1 January 1916
- Place of birth: Faenza, Kingdom of Italy
- Date of death: 6 May 2010 (aged 94)
- Place of death: Faenza, Italy
- Height: 1.70 m (5 ft 7 in)
- Position: Forward

Senior career*
| Years | Team | Apps | (Gls) |
| 1931–1932 | Faenza | | |
| 1933–1936 | Livorno | 46 | (4) |
| 1936–1937 | Juventus | 11 | (1) |
| 1937–1939 | Livorno | 53 | (11) |
| 1939–1943 | Genova 1893 | 92 | (31) |
| 1945–1946 | Genoa | 16 | (3) |
| 1946–1948 | Internazionale | 38 | (10) |
| 1948–1950 | Pescara | 25 | (1) |

International career
| 1939–1940 | Italy | 3 | (1) |

Managerial career
- 1951–1954: Alessandria
- 1954–1955: Lucchese
- 1957–1959: Faenza
- * Club domestic league appearances and goals

Giacomo Neri (Italian pronunciation: [ˈdʒaːkomo ˈneːri]; 1 January 1916 – 6 May 2010) was an Italian professional football player and coach.

A right winger, Neri played a total of 216 Serie A games, with 53 goals, throughout his career, and also played three games for the Italy national football team, scoring a goal.

He died in his home town of Faenza at the age of 94; he was the oldest living man at the time to have played for the Italy national team.
