= Enrico Santià =

Italian footballer (born 1918)

Personal information
- Date of birth: 6 November 1918
- Place of birth: Santhià, Italy
- Date of death: 18 January 1996 (aged 77)
- Position: Midfielder

Senior career*
Years	Team	Apps	(Gls)
1936–1937	GUF Torino		
1937–1940	Juventus	20	(4)
1940–1941	Novara	15	(5)
1941–1942	Torino	3	(0)
1942–1945	Padova		
- * Club domestic league appearances and goals

Enrico Santià (6 November 1918 – 18 January 1996) was an Italian professional footballer who played as a midfielder.
