= All Joseon Football Championship =

1935–1940 competition in Korea, Empire of Japan

- Organiser(s): Joseon Football Association
- Founded: 1935
- Abolished: 1940
- Region: Korea, Empire of Japan
- Qualifier for: Emperor's Cup
- Related competitions: Korea Cup
- Most championships: Bosung College (3 titles)

The All Joseon Football Championship (Korean: 전조선축구선수권대회) was a football competition held annually by the Joseon Football Association in Korea under Japanese rule between 1935 and 1940. It was a qualifying tournament for the Emperor's Cup and is being recognised as a predecessor of the Korea Cup.

The Joseon Football Association was founded in 1933, and started to hold their annual football competition, All Joseon Football Championship, in 1935 regardless of the All Joseon Football Tournament, held by Joseon Sports Council since 1921. Its champions qualified for Japanese national football cup, Emperor's Cup, and inaugural champions Kyungsung FC won the Emperor's Cup title the same year. In 1940, the competition was abolished by Japan prior to World War II.

== Summary ==
=== Finals ===
Season	Champions	Score	Runners-up
1935	Kyungsung FC	1–0	Pyongyang FC
1936	Bosung College	1–0	Yonhi College
1937	Bosung College	6–1	Gyeongseong Medical College
1938	Yonhi College	6–4 (a.e.t.)	Bosung College
1939	Bosung College	1–0	Hamhung FC
1940	Yonhi College	1–0	Hamhung FC

=== Titles by club ===
Club	Titles	Seasons won
Bosung College	3	1936, 1937, 1939
Yonhi College	2	1938, 1940
Kyungsung FC	1	1935

== Details ==
=== 1935 ===
14 May	Kyungsung FC	1–0	Pyongyang FC	Gyeongseong, Korea
16:40 UTC+9	Bae Jeong-ho 65'			Stadium: Gyeongseong Stadium; Referee: Kwon Hee-chang
Note: Kyungsung FC qualified for the 1935 Emperor's Cup.

=== 1936 ===
7 May Semi-final 1	Yonhi College	6–0	Railway FC	Gyeongseong, Korea
16:15 UTC+9				Stadium: Gyeongseong Stadium; Referee: Kwon Hee-chang

7 May Semi-final 2	Gyeongseong Medical College	2–7	Bosung College	Gyeongseong, Korea
17:55 UTC+9				Stadium: Gyeongseong Stadium; Referee: Jeong Moon-gi

9 May Final	Yonhi College	0–1	Bosung College	Gyeongseong, Korea
13:05 UTC+9			Song Gi-myeong 67'	Stadium: Gyeongseong Stadium; Referee: Jo Young-ha
Note: Bosung College qualified for the 1936 Emperor's Cup.

=== 1937 ===
22 May Semi-final 1	Gyeongseong Medical College	10–1	Jeonju High School	Gyeongseong, Korea
15:15 UTC+9			? (?)	Stadium: Gyeongseong Stadium; Referee: Pyeon Moo-young
Note: The match consisted of 70 minutes.

22 May Semi-final 2	Bosung College	1–0	Yonhi College	Gyeongseong, Korea
17:00 UTC+9	Bae Jeong-ho 65'			Stadium: Gyeongseong Stadium; Referee: Jo Young-ha
Note: The match consisted of 70 minutes.

23 May Final	Gyeongseong Medical College	1–6	Bosung College	Gyeongseong, Korea
17:00 UTC+9	Lee Jae-seop 25'		Bae Jeong-ho 16', 50'; ? 75'; ? 78'; ? 79'; ? 80'	Stadium: Gyeongseong Stadium; Referee: Kwon Hee-chang
Note: Bosung College qualified for the 1937 Emperor's Cup.

=== 1938 ===
14 May	Yonhi College	6–4 (a.e.t.)	Bosung College	Gyeongseong, Korea
15:12 UTC+9	Wui Hye-deok 6', 35' (pen.), 43', 44'; Kim Seong-woo (?); Kim Sung-gan 169'		Bae Jeong-ho 48', 76'; Hwang Jeong-ha 70'; Kim Yong-sik 82' (pen.)	Stadium: Gyeongseong Stadium; Referee: Pyeon Moo-young
Note: The match consisted of 90-minute ordinary time and 80-minute extra time (four overtime periods). The winners were originally going to advance to the regional qualifying play-off for the 1938 Emperor's Cup, but Yonhi College directly qualified for the Emperor's Cup after Jinnampo Smelter (Nippon Mining) withdrew from the play-off.

=== 1939 ===
Previous champions Yonhi College entered the qualifying play-off for the Emperor's Cup instead of the All Joseon Championship.

6 May Hamnam qualifier 1	Hamhung FC	5–0	Wonsan FC	Hamhung, Korea
13:00 UTC+9				Stadium: Hamnam Middle School

6 May Gyeonggi qualifier	Bosung College	9–0	Kyungsung FC	Gyeongseong, Korea
14:35 UTC+9	Hwang Jong-soon 15', 62', 82'; Lee Young-chang 35', 89'; U Jeong-hwan 38', 73'; Kim Hong-dong 45'; Hwang Jeong-ha 77'			Stadium: Gyeongseong Stadium; Referee: Kim Young-je
Note: Bosung College advanced to the semi-final.

7 May Hamnam qualifier 2	Hamhung FC	7–0	Samho FC	Hamhung, Korea
: UTC+9				Stadium: Hamnam Middle School
Note: Hamhung FC advanced to the final.

13 May Semi-final	Bosung College	6–1	Chongjin FC	Gyeongseong, Korea
15:20 UTC+9	Hwang Jong-soon 35'; Lee Young-chang 44'; U Jeong-hwan 48'; Kim In-mo 68', 78'; Hwang Jeong-ha 74'		Lim Il-soon 8'	Stadium: Gyeongseong Stadium; Referee: Hyeon Jeong-joo

15 May Final	Hamhung FC	0–1	Bosung College	Gyeongseong, Korea
17:06 UTC+9			Hwang Jong-soon 65'	Stadium: Gyeongseong Stadium; Referee: Kim Hwa-jip
Note: Bosung College qualified for the 1939 Emperor's Cup.

=== 1940 ===
Previous champions Bosung College entered the qualifying play-off for the Emperor's Cup instead of the All Joseon Championship.

17 May Semi-final 1	Hamhung FC	3–1 (a.e.t.)	Chongjin FC	Gyeongseong, Korea
15:02 UTC+9	Kang Do-hee 12', 79'; Kim In-cheol 89'		Lee Young-chang 32'	Stadium: Gyeongseong Stadium; Attendance: 7,000; Referee: Kim Seong-woo
Note: The match consisted of 70-minute ordinary time and 20-minute extra time.

17 May Semi-final 2	Yonhi College	3–2	Pyongyang FC	Gyeongseong, Korea
16:55 UTC+9	Oh Gyeong-hwan 20'; Wui Hye-deok 29', 44'		Kim Yong-sik 5' (pen.); Chae Geum-seok 25'	Stadium: Gyeongseong Stadium; Attendance: 7,000; Referee: Kim Jae-hong
Note: The match consisted of 70 minutes.

18 May Final	Hamhung FC	0–1	Yonhi College	Gyeongseong, Korea
16:00 UTC+9			Oh Gyeong-hwan 63'	Stadium: Gyeongseong Stadium; Attendance: 10,000; Referee: Kwon Hee-chang
Note: Yonhi College qualified for the 1940 Emperor's Cup.

== See also ==
- List of Korea Cup winners
- Korea Cup (domestic)
- Korean National Football Championship
- Korean President's Cup
- All Joseon Football Tournament
