= List of association football club rivalries in Asia and Oceania =

This list deals with association football rivalries around Asia and Oceania among clubs. This includes local derbies as well as matches between teams further afield. For rivalries between international teams and club rivalries around the world, see List of association football rivalries.

Only clubs of federations which are members of AFC or OFC are included.

The article is alphabetically split into OFC and the AFC federations: AFF (South East Asia and Australasia), CAFA (Central Asia), EAFF (East Asia), SAFF (South Asia), and WAFF (West Asia).

== Clubs in AFF ==
=== Australia ===
==== A-League ====
- Melbourne derby: Melbourne City vs. Melbourne Victory
- Sydney derby: Sydney vs. Western Sydney Wanderers
- The Big Blue: Melbourne Victory vs. Sydney
- The F3 derby: Central Coast Mariners vs. Newcastle United Jets
- The Original Rivalry: Adelaide United vs. Melbourne Victory
- New Zealand Derby: Wellington Phoenix vs. Auckland
- Battle of the West: Western Sydney Wanderers FC vs. Macarthur FC

==== Lower leagues ====
- Sydney Olympic vs. Sydney United 58
- Marconi Stallions vs. Sydney Olympic
- Sydney Olympic vs. APIA Leichhardt Tigers
- APIA Leichhardt Tigers vs. Marconi Stallions
- Brisbane City Football Club vs. Brisbane Olympic
- Heidelberg United vs. South Melbourne
- South Melbourne vs. Melbourne Knights
- Adelaide Derby: Adelaide City vs. West Adelaide
- Frank Farina Cup rivalry: Far North Queensland vs. Northern Fury

=== Brunei ===
- Belait derby: BSRC vs. Hawa vs. KB
- Jerudong derby: DPMM vs. Jerudong
- Uniformed derby: MS ABDB vs. MS PPDB

=== Cambodia ===
- Phnom Penh Crown–Svay Rieng rivalry: Phnom Penh Crown vs. Svay Rieng
- The Cambodia Classic: Phnom Penh Crown vs. Boeung Ket Angkor

=== Indonesia ===
- Indonesian El Clásico: Persib Bandung vs. Persija Jakarta
- Super East Java derby: Arema vs. Persebaya Surabaya
- Andalas derby: Semen Padang vs. Sriwijaya
- Arema–Persib Bandung rivalry: Arema vs. Persib Bandung
- Bandung derby: Persib Bandung vs. Persikab Bandung
- Bekasi derby: Persikasi Bekasi vs. Persipasi Kota Bekasi
- Perserikatan rivalries: Persebaya Surabaya vs. Persib Bandung vs. Persija Jakarta vs. PSM Makassar vs. PSMS Medan
- Bogor derby: Persikabo 1973 vs. PSB Bogor
- Jakarta derby: Persija Jakarta vs. Persitara North Jakarta
- Ciliwung derby: Persikabo Bogor vs. Persikad Depok
- Classic Aceh derby: Persiraja Banda Aceh vs. PSAP Sigli
- Persib–PSMS rivalry: Persib Bandung vs. PSMS Medan
- Mahakam derby: Borneo Samarinda vs. PS Mitra Kukar
- Malut United–PSM rivalry: Malut United vs. PSM Makassar
- Mataram derby: Persis Solo vs. PSIM Yogyakarta
- Old North Maluku derby: Persiter Ternate vs. Persikota Tidore
- Papadaan derby: Borneo Samarinda vs. Barito Putera
- Pasundan derby: Persib Bandung vs. Persikabo 1973
- Persija–Persikabo rivalry: Persija Jakarta vs. Persikabo 1973
- Persija–Persita rivalry: Persija Jakarta vs. Persita Tangerang
- Persiraja–PSMS rivalry: Persiraja Banda Aceh vs. PSMS Medan
- Semarang derby: Persikas Semarang vs. PSIS Semarang
- Super Central Java derby: Persis Solo vs. PSIS Semarang
- Super Eastern Indonesia derby: PSM Makassar vs. Persipura Jayapura
- North Sumatra derby: PSMS Medan vs. PSDS Deli Serdang
- Suramadu derby: Persebaya Surabaya vs. Madura United
- Tangerang derby: Persita Tangerang vs. Persikota Tangerang
- Yogyakarta derby: PSIM Yogyakarta vs. PSS Sleman

=== Malaysia ===
- Malaysian Giants Clash: Selangor vs. Johor Darul Ta'zim
- East Coast Derby: Terengganu vs. Kelantan vs. Sri Pahang
- Borneo derby: Sabah vs. Sarawak vs. Kuching City vs. Sarawak United
- Klang Valley derby: Selangor vs. Kuala Lumpur City
- Royal Derby: Johor Darul Ta'zim vs. Sri Pahang
- Selangor derby: Selangor vs. Petaling Jaya City
- Naning derby: Negeri Sembilan vs. Melaka United
- Southern Derby: Melaka United vs. Johor Darul Ta'zim vs. Negeri Sembilan
- Uniform derby: Armed Forces vs. PDRM FA
- University derby: UKM vs. UiTM
- Northern derby: Kedah Darul Aman vs Perak vs. Penang
- Kelantan derby: Kelantan vs. Kelantan United
- Sarawak derby: Sarawak United vs. Kuching City

=== Myanmar ===
- Super Myanmar derby: Yangon United vs. Yadanarbon

=== Philippines ===
- Visayas Clásico:
  - Ceres–Negros vs. Global Cebu (defunct as Ceres–Negros rebranded as United City and cease to be associated with Negros, and with the blacklisting of Global after relocating to Makati)
  - Ceres–Negros vs. Kaya–Iloilo (defunct as Ceres–Negros rebranded as United City and cease to be associated with Negros)
  - Dynamic Herb Cebu vs. Kaya–Iloilo
- Capital Clásico: Meralco Manila vs. Kaya–Makati (defunct as Meralco Manila disbanded, and Kaya relocated to Iloilo)
- Armed Forces rivalry: Philippine Army vs. Philippine Air Force
- Taguig derby: Maharlika Taguig vs. One Taguig

=== Singapore ===
- Uniformed derby: Warriors FC vs. Lion City Sailors
- Eastern derby: Geylang International vs Tampines Rovers

=== Thailand ===
- Muangthong-Buriram rivalry: Muangthong United vs. Buriram United
- Thailand Clasico: Muangthong United vs. Chonburi
- Muangthong-Tharuea rivalry (a Bangkok derby): Muangthong United vs. Port

=== Timor-Leste ===
- Karketu Dili–SLB Laulara rivalry: Karketu Dili vs. SLB Laulara

=== Vietnam ===
- Hanoi FC - Hoang Anh Gia Lai rivalry (National Team derby): Hanoi vs. Hoang Anh Gia Lai
- Hanoi FC - Song Lam Nghe An rivalry: Hanoi vs. Sông Lam Nghệ An
- Hanoi FC - Becamex Binh Duong rivalry: Hanoi vs. Becamex Bình Dương
- Hanoi FC - Nam Dinh FC rivalry: Hanoi vs. Nam Dinh
- Hanoi FC - Thanh Hoa FC rivalry: Hanoi vs. Thanh Hoa
- Hanoi FC - Ho Chi Minh City FC rivalry: Hanoi vs. Ho Chi Minh City
- Hanoi FC - Hong Linh Ha Tinh FC rivalry: Hanoi vs. Hong Linh Ha Tinh
- Capital derbies:
  - Hanoi derby: Hanoi vs. The Cong–Viettel
  - Hanoi vs. Cong An Ha Noi
  - The Cong–Viettel vs. Cong An Ha Noi
- Northern derbies:
  - Hanoi vs. Haiphong
  - Nam Dinh vs. Haiphong
- North Central derbies:
  - Thanh Hoa FC -Song Lam Nghe An FC rivalry: Thanh Hoa vs. Song Lam Nghe An
  - Nghe - Tinh derby: Song Lam Nghe An vs. Hong Linh Ha Tinh
  - Hue vs. Quang Nam
  - Thanh Hoa FC - Hong Linh Ha Tinh rivalry: Thanh Hoa vs. Hong Linh Ha Tinh
  - Quang - Da derby: SHB Da Nang vs. Quang Nam
- Southern derbies:
  - Song Be derby: Becamex Binh Duong vs. Binh Phuoc
  - Ho Chi Minh City vs. Becamex Binh Duong
  - Dong Nai vs. Long An
  - Dong Nai vs. Dong Thap
  - Dong Nai vs. Binh Phuoc

== Clubs in CAFA ==
=== Iran ===
- Tehran Derby: Esteghlal vs. Persepolis
- Isfahan Derby: Sepahan vs. Zob Ahan
- Gilan derby: Damash or Sepidrood vs. Malavan
- Persepolis–Sepahan rivalry: Persepolis vs. Sepahan
- Esteghlal–Sepahan rivalry: Esteghlal vs. Sepahan
- Mashhad Derby: Aboomoslem or Siah Jamegan vs. Payam or Padideh
- Persepolis–Tractor rivalry: Persepolis vs. Tractor
- Esteghlal–Tractor rivalry: Esteghlal vs. Tractor
- Ahvaz Derby: Foolad vs. Esteghlal Khuzestan

=== Kyrgyzstan ===
- Capital derby or Bishkek derby: Dordoi vs. Alga
- North-South rivalry: Dordoi/Alga vs. Alay/Neftchi Kochkor-Ata
- Southern derby: Alay vs. Neftchi Kochkor-Ata

=== Tajikistan ===
- Big derby or Derby of two capitals: Istiklol Dushanbe vs. Khujand
- North-South rivalry: Khujand vs. Ravshan
- Khatlon derby or Southern derby: Khatlon vs. Ravshan
- Northern derby or Soghd derby: Khujand vs. Istaravshan
- The Big Dushanbe derby: Istiklol vs. CSKA Pamir
- Dushanbe derby: Istiklol vs. Varzob vs. CSKA Pamir vs. Dynamo

=== Turkmenistan ===
- Great derby: Ahal vs. Altyn Asyr
- Ahal derby: Ahal vs. Arkadagh
- Ashghabad derby or Capital derby: Altyn Asyr vs. Ashghabad vs. Kopetdagh vs. Nisa vs. Yedigen
- South-North rivalry: Altyn Asyr/Ahal vs. Turan Dashoghuz
- Western derby or Balkan derby or Oil derby: Nebitchi vs. Shaghadam
- Mary derby: Merv vs. Energetik

=== Uzbekistan ===
- The Big Tashkent derby: Pakhtakor vs. Bunyodkor
- Tashkent derby: Pakhtakor vs. Lokomotiv Tashkent vs. Bunyodkor
- Uzbek El Clasico: Pakhtakor vs. Neftchi Ferghana
- New Uzbek El Clasico: Navbahor vs. Pakhtakor
- Valley derby: Neftchi Ferghana vs. Navbahor vs. Andijan vs. Kokand 1912
- Ferghana derby: Turan vs. Neftchi Ferghana vs. Kokand 1912
- Ancient cities rivalry: Dinamo Samarkand vs. Bukhara vs. Khorazm
- Southern derby: Nasaf vs. Surkhan
- Industrialists rivalry: Qizilqum vs. AGMK vs. Metallurg Bekabad
- Northern rivalry: Aral vs. Khorazm
- Qashqadarya derby: Nasaf vs. Mash'al vs. Shurtan
- Bukhara derby: Bukhara vs. Ghijduvan
- Soghdiana vs. Gulistan rivalry
- Nasaf vs. Navbahor rivalry
- Nasaf vs. Pakhtakor rivalry

== Clubs in EAFF ==
=== China PR ===
==== Active rivalries ====
- Beijing Guoan F.C.–Shandong Taishan F.C. rivalry
- Jing–Hu rivalry: Beijing Guoan vs. Shanghai Shenhua
- Jing–Jin derby: Beijing Guoan vs. Tianjin Jinmen Tiger
- Qingdao derby: Qingdao Hainiu vs. Qingdao West Coast
- Shanghai derby: Shanghai Shenhua vs. Shanghai Port

==== Inactive rivalries ====
- Beijing derby
- Dalian derby
- Guangzhou derby

=== Hong Kong ===
- The Classic Derby: South China vs. Kitchee (Hong Kong El Clásico)
- South-East Clash: Eastern vs. South China
- The Majestic of Blue/Double Blues: Kitchee vs. Eastern
- South China AA–Pegasus rivalry (Derby of Bros): South China vs. TSW Pegasus
- New Territories Derby: Tai Po vs. Yuen Long

=== Japan ===
- Eternal derby: Kashima Antlers vs. Yokohama F. Marinos
- Saitama derby: Urawa Red Diamonds vs. RB Omiya Ardija
- Yokohama derby: Yokohama F. Marinos vs. Yokohama
- Fukushima derby: Fukushima United vs. Iwaki
- Ibaraki derby: Kashima Antlers vs. Mito HollyHock
- Tochigi derby: Tochigi vs. Tochigi City
- Chiba derby: JEF United Chiba vs. Kashiwa Reysol
- Tokyo derby: Tokyo vs. Tokyo Verdy
- Tokyo Classic: Tokyo Verdy vs. FC Machida Zelvia
- Kanagawa derby: Kawasaki Frontale vs. Yokohama F. Marinos vs. Yokohama vs. Shonan Bellmare
- Shinshu derby: Matsumoto Yamaga vs. AC Nagano Parceiro
- Shizuoka derby: Shimizu S-Pulse vs. Júbilo Iwata
- Osaka derby: Gamba Osaka vs. Cerezo Osaka
- Iyo Kessen: Ehime vs. Imabari
- Fukuoka derby: Avispa Fukuoka vs. Giravanz Kitakyushu

=== North Korea ===
- Pyongyang derby: 25 April vs. Pyongyang

=== South Korea ===
==== Active derbies ====
===== Derbies between unrelegated clubs ("Eternal derbies") =====
- Hyundai derby: Jeonbuk Hyundai Motors vs. Ulsan HD
- Jeonseol match: Jeonbuk Hyundai Motors vs. Seoul
- Donghaean derby: Ulsan HD vs. Pohang Steelers
- Other "eternal derbies":
  - Pohang Steelers vs. FC Seoul/Jeonbuk Hyundai Motors FC
  - Ulsan HD FC vs. FC Seoul

===== Other derbies =====
- Gyeongin derby: FC Seoul vs. Incheon United
- Gongseongjeon: Jeonbuk Hyundai Motors vs. Suwon Samsung Bluewings
- Magyedaejeon: Seongnam Ilhwa Chunma vs. Suwon Samsung Bluewings
- Super Match: Suwon Samsung Bluewings vs. FC Seoul
- University derby (U-League): Yonsei University vs. Korea University

==== Defunct derbies ====
- Kyungsung–Pyongyang rivalry: Kyungsung vs. Pyongyang
- Seoul Dongdaemun derby: Seongnam Ilhwa Chunma vs. LG Cheetahs, Yukong Elephants vs. Ilhwa Chunma, LG Cheetahs vs Yukong Elephants derbies held before 1996 between former clubs based in Seoul

== Clubs in OFC ==
=== Fiji ===
- Rewa derby: Rewa vs. Suva
- Ba vs. Nadroga

=== New Zealand ===
- Auckland Derby: Auckland City vs. Waitakere United
- Dominion Road derby: Auckland City vs. Auckland United
- Christchurch Derby: Christchurch United vs. Cahsmere Technical

=== Papua New Guinea ===
- National derby: Hekari United vs. Lae City

=== Solomon Islands ===
- Solomon Derby: Real Kakamora vs. Solomon Warriors

=== Tahiti ===
- National derby: A.S. Pirae vs. A.S. Vénus

== Clubs in SAFF ==
=== Bangladesh ===
- Dhaka Derby : Dhaka Mohammedan vs. Dhaka Abahani
- Black & White Derby : Dhaka Mohammedan vs Dhaka Wandeders
- Dhaka Clasico : Dhaka Mohammedan vs. Bashundhara Kings
- Abahani Derby : Dhaka Abahani vs. Chittagong Abahani
- Mohammedan Derby : Dhaka Mohammedan vs. Chittagoang Mohammedan
- Bangla Clasico : Bashundhara Kings vs. Dhaka Abahani

=== India ===
- Kolkata Derby: Mohun Bagan vs East Bengal
- Kolkata Mini Derby: Mohun Bagan/East Bengal vs Kolkata Mohammedan
- South Indian Derby: Bengaluru FC vs Chennaiyin vs Kerala Blasters
- Northeast Derby: Shillong Lajong vs Aizawl
- Imphal Derby: NEROCA vs TRAU
- Shillong Derby: Shillong Lajong vs Royal Wahingdoh

=== Nepal ===
- Kathmandu derby: Manang Marsyangdi vs Three Star Club
- Valley derby : Kathmandu Rayzrs vs Lalitpur City

=== Pakistan ===
- Chaman derby: Afghan Chaman vs Muslim
- Quetta–Chaman rivalry: Baloch vs Muslim

== Clubs in WAFF ==
=== Iraq ===
- Baghdad Derbies (also known as Iraqi Classicos): Al-Quwa Al-Jawiya vs. Al-Shorta vs. Al-Talaba vs. Al-Zawraa
- Basra Derby: Al-Minaa vs. Naft Al-Basra
- Northern Derby: Duhok vs. Erbil
- Duhok Derby: Duhok vs. Zakho
- Najaf Derby: Al-Najaf vs. Naft Al-Wasat

=== Jordan ===
- Amman Derby: Al-Faisaly vs. Al-Wehdat
- North Derby: Al-Hussein vs. Al-Ramtha

=== Kuwait ===
- Kuwaiti El Clásico: Qadsia vs. Al-Arabi

=== Lebanon ===
- Beirut Derby: Nejmeh vs. Ansar
- Al Ahed FC–Al Ansar FC rivalry: Ahed vs. Ansar
- Al Ahed FC–Nejmeh SC rivalry: Ahed vs. Nejmeh
- Achrafieh derby: Racing vs. Sagesse
- Armenian derby: Homenmen vs. Homenetmen
- Bar Elias derby: Nahda vs. Nasser
- Dahieh derby: Bourj vs. Shabab Sahel vs. Shabab Bourj
- Mountain derby: Safa vs. Akhaa Ahli
- North derby: Tripoli vs. Salam Zgharta vs. Egtmaaey
- Safa SC–Al Ansar FC rivalry: Safa vs. Ansar
- Safa SC–Nejmeh SC rivalry: Safa vs. Nejmeh
- South derby: Tadamon Sour vs. Ghazieh
- Tripoli derby: Tripoli vs. Egtmaaey
- Tyre derby: Tadamon Sour vs. Salam Sour

=== Palestine ===
- Al-Quds Derby: Hilal Al-Quds vs. Jabal Al-Mukaber

=== Saudi Arabia ===
- Eternal derbies of Saudi Arabia:
  - Saudi El Clasico: Al-Hilal vs. Al-Ittihad
  - Riyadh Derby: Al-Hilal vs. Al-Nassr
  - Al-Ittihad—Al-Nassr Clasico: Al-Ittihad vs. Al-Nassr
- Saudi Derby: Al-Ahli vs. Al-Hilal
- Jeddah Derby: Al-Ahli vs. Al-Ittihad
- Buraidah Derby: Al-Raed vs. Al-Taawoun
- Al-Hasa derby: Hajer vs. Al-Fateh
- Al-Sharqiyah derby: Ettifaq vs. Al-Qadsiah
- Al-Haramain Derby: Al Wehda vs. Ohod

=== Syria ===
- Aleppo derby: Al-Ittihad vs. Al-Hurriya
- Damascus derby: Al-Jaish vs. Al-Wahda
- Hama derby: Taliya vs. Nawair
- Homs derby: Al-Karamah vs. Al-Wathba
- Latakia derby: Tishreen vs. Hutteen

=== United Arab Emirates ===
- Al Classico: Al Ain vs. Al Wasl vs. Al-Wahda
- UAE Pro Era Rivalry: Al Ain vs Shabab Al Ahli
- Bur Dubai Derby: Al Nasr vs. Al Wasl
- Abu Dhabi City Derby: Al Jazira vs Al Wahda
