= Lee Young-min =

South Korean athlete, baseball manager, and promoter

Personal information
- Date of birth: 1 December 1905
- Place of birth: ?, Gyeongbuk, Korean Empire
- Date of death: 12 August 1954 (aged 48)
- Place of death: Seoul, South Korea
- Positions: Forward; midfielder

Youth career
- Paichai High School

College career
Years	Team	Apps	(Gls)
1925–1928	Yonhi College		
1931	Yonhi College		

Senior career*
Years	Team	Apps	(Gls)
1927–1928	Joseon FC		
1929	Yeonu Gurakbu		
1932	Gyerim FC		
1933–?	Kyungsung FC		

Managerial career
- 1933–?: Kyungsung FC
- 1948: South Korea
- * Club domestic league appearances and goals

Lee Young-min
- Pitcher, outfielder
- Bats: Right Throws: Right

Career highlights and awards
- Japanese Baseball All-Star (1934)

- Lee Young-min
- Hangul: 이영민
- Hanja: 李榮敏
- RR: I Yeongmin
- MR: I Yŏngmin

Lee Young-min (Korean: 이영민; Hanja: 李榮敏; 1 December 1905 – 12 August 1954) was a South Korean versatile sportsman who played in football, baseball and athletics.

== Early life ==
Lee's birthplace wasn't precisely known, but it is being assumed that Chilgok or Yecheon. When Lee became a student of Paichai High School, located in Keijō (the former name of Seoul, and also known as Gyeongseong or Kyungsung in Korean), he played as an athlete of his school in football, baseball and athletics. He won a high school competition of the Gyeongin Ekiden Championship and a high school division of the All Joseon Football Tournament with his team.

== Playing career ==
Lee's school Yonhi College participated in the senior division of All Joseon Football Tournament since 1927, and he won the 1927 and 1928 tournament.

In 1928, Lee won five titles at an All Joseon Athletics Games, and especially in the 400 m sprint, he set a new competition record. In the same year, he also hit the Korean first official home run in a baseball match against Gyeongseong Medical College.

In 1929, Lee became the only Korean player in the baseball club of Chōsen Shokusan Bank after his graduation from college, and started to play in the Chōsen Semi-professional Baseball League. He made his Chōsen League debut on 6 July.

Lee also participated as a player of Gyeongseong's football team in the football series between Gyeongseong and Pyongyang since 1930, and played for Kyungsung FC after it was formally founded.

In 1932, Lee was selected for Zenkeijō, the selection of Japanese Baseball players who were living in Gyeongseong including Shokusan Bank players, for the first time.

In 1933, Lee helped to found the Joseon Football Association, currently Korea Football Association. In the same year, he played Intercity baseball tournament (Japanese national competition) games for Zenkeijō, and led his team to finish as runners-up.

In November 1934, Lee was selected for the Japanese Baseball All-Star Team, and also played games against American All-Star Team who visited Japan. He took a picture with Babe Ruth at that time.

In 1935, Lee took on both roles player and manager of Kyungsung FC in the Japanese FA cup Emperor's Cup, and won the title.

Lee played his last baseball game for Zenkeijō on 2 August 1936, and for Shokusan Bank on 10 September 1936.

== Managerial career ==
Lee became the first manager who managed South Korea national football team at an international competition by participating in the 1948 Summer Olympics. He accomplished South Korean first ever victory in an international football competition against Mexico in the first round of the tournament.

== Death and legacy ==
Lee led a promiscuous life and was unconcerned with his family. On 12 August 1954, Lee's third son Lee In-seop, who had run away from home, returned home to try a burglary with his friends, but one of In-seop's friends killed Lee during the burglary. The Korea Baseball Association made the Lee Young-min Batting Award in 1958 to commemorate Lee's death, and it has been awarded to the overall batting champion in nine high school baseball competitions in South Korea.

== Honours ==
=== Football player ===
Yonhi College

- All Joseon Football Tournament: 1927, 1928

Yeonu Gurakbu

- All Joseon Football Tournament runner-up: 1929

Gyerim FC

- All Joseon Football Tournament runner-up: 1932

Kyungsung FC

- All Joseon Football Tournament runner-up: 1933
- Emperor's Cup: 1935
- Chōsen Shrine Games: 1935
- Meiji Shrine Games: 1935
