= Kyungsung FC–Pyongyang FC rivalry =

Early 20th-century Korean football rivalry

Kyung-Pyong Football Series
- Location: Japanese Korea, Korea
- Teams: Kyungsung FC; Pyongyang FC
- First meeting: Between selections: 8 October 1929; Kyungsung XI 1–1 Pyongyang XI; Between clubs: 6 April 1933; Pyongyang FC 2–3 Kyungsung FC
- Latest meeting: 27 March 1946; Kyungsung FC 1–3 Pyongyang FC

- Kyung-Pyong Football Series
- Hangul: 경평대항축구전
- Hanja: 京平蹴球對抗戰
- Revised Romanization: Gyeong-Pyeong Daehang Chukgujeon
- McCune–Reischauer: Kyŏng-P'yŏng Taehang Ch'ukkujŏn

The Kyungsung FC–Pyongyang FC rivalry, commonly known as the Kyung-Pyong Football Series, was a football rivalry in the early 20th century between Seoul (called Gyeongseong/Kyungsung or Keijō at the time) and Pyongyang (Heijō) which are currently capital of South Korea and North Korea. The clash between Korea's two biggest cities was considered as the biggest rivalry in Korea. Seoul and Pyongyang developed historical rivalry for over a century, and their football teams were no exception.

== History ==
In the Joseon era of Korea, Hanyang (currently Seoul) was the capital, and Pyongyang was the second largest city. By the way, Joseon government created the discriminative atmosphere against Pyongan Province including Pyongyang, and there was also profound conflict between the two largest cities. They developed a rivalry due to Korean historical backgrounds.

Many football clubs and school teams were made in 1910s in Korea along the booming of football, and the All Joseon Football Tournament was held in 1921. In this tournament, clubs based on Seoul such as Joseon FC, Youth Buddhist Club, and Health Club had matches against the clubs in Pyongyang like Muo FC.

The first Kyung-Pyong Football Series was held by the Chosun Ilbo in Seoul in 1929, and the united team in each city participated. It was so popular as most of the shops closed at the match days. However, the series was often stopped because of the riot between excited fans, and at last it was all folded after 1930. In 1933, Pyongyang FC and Kyungsung FC were officially founded, and the annual series was reopened. After 1936, however, it was substituted by other cup matches which many clubs from other cities joined. Despite the end of the series, the two clubs occasionally met each other in several competitions until the division of South and North Korea.

== Series ==
No.	Date	Competition	Home team	Score	Away team	Goals (home)	Goals (away)	Venue	Ref.
1	8 October 1929	1st Chosun Ilbo; Kyung-Pyong Football Series	Kyungsung XI	1–1	Pyongyang XI	Choi Seong-son 16'	Kim Jeong-sik 62'	Whimoon High School, Kyungsung	
2	9 October 1929	1st Chosun Ilbo; Kyung-Pyong Football Series	Kyungsung XI	3–4	Pyongyang XI	Geo Bok-jun 62'; Choi Seong-son 69', 88'	Lee Jeong-sik 42', 54', 65'; Park Ui-hyeon 83'	Whimoon High School, Kyungsung	
3	10 October 1929	1st Chosun Ilbo; Kyung-Pyong Football Series	Kyungsung XI	2–4	Pyongyang XI	Jeong Won-soon 60' (o.g.); Choi Seong-son 70'	Lee Jeong-sik 10', 30'; Kang Gi-dae 11' ? 88'	Whimoon High School, Kyungsung	
4	28 November 1930	2nd Chosun Ilbo; Kyung-Pyong Football Series	Kyungsung XI	3–2	Pyongyang XI	Lee Young-min 40', 41'; Choi Seong-son 79'	Kim Jae-shin 28'; Han Young-taek 36'	Kyungsung Stadium, Kyungsung	
5	29 November 1930	2nd Chosun Ilbo; Kyung-Pyong Football Series	Kyungsung XI	3–5	Pyongyang XI	Lee Jeong-woo 60', 80'; Choi Seong-son 62' (pen.)	Han Young-taek 27'; Park Young-chul 36'; Kim Jae-shin 61', 63'; Ko Jeong-han 75'	Kyungsung Stadium, Kyungsung	
6	1 December 1930	2nd Chosun Ilbo; Kyung-Pyong Football Series	Kyungsung XI	5–1	Pyongyang XI	Kim Won-gyeom 19'; Choi Seong-son 31', 80'; Lee Young-min 53', 87'	Han Young-taek (?)	Kyungsung Stadium, Kyungsung	
7	6 April 1933	Kyungsung vs Pyongyang; Football Series	Pyongyang FC	2–3	Kyungsung FC	? (?); Kim Sung-gan 35'	Park Young-hwan 40'; Kang Yeong-pil 44', 64'	Girimri Stadium, Pyongyang	
8	8 April 1933	Kyungsung vs Pyongyang; Football Series	Pyongyang FC	2–2	Kyungsung FC	Park Ui-hyeon 70'; Kim Young-geun 75'	Kang Gi-soon 25'; Choi Seong-son 40'	Girimri Stadium, Pyongyang	
9	10 April 1933	Kyungsung vs Pyongyang; Football Series	Pyongyang FC	3–0	Kyungsung FC	Lee Jeong-sik 52'; Lee Jeong-hyeon 65', 85'	—	Girimri Stadium, Pyongyang	
10	20 September 1933	Joseon Sports Council; Kyung-Pyong Football Series	Kyungsung FC	3–2	Pyongyang FC	Bae Jeong-ho 42', 70'; Kang Yeong-pil 75'	Kim Young-geun 41'; Lee Chi-soon 85'	Paichai High School, Kyungsung	
11	21 September 1933	Joseon Sports Council; Kyung-Pyong Football Series	Kyungsung FC	2–3	Pyongyang FC	Kang Yeong-pil 37'; Chae Geum-seok 65'	Han Young-taek 26' (?), 87'	Paichai High School, Kyungsung	
12	22 September 1933	Joseon Sports Council; Kyung-Pyong Football Series	Kyungsung FC	1–1	Pyongyang FC	Kim Il-bae 50'	Lee Jeong-sik 53'	Paichai High School, Kyungsung	
13	23 October 1933	1st Kyung-Pyong; Regular Football Series	Pyongyang FC	1–1	Kyungsung FC	Unknown		Girimri Stadium, Pyongyang	
14	24 October 1933	1st Kyung-Pyong; Regular Football Series	Pyongyang FC	1–1	Kyungsung FC	Park Young-hwan 71'	Kang Young-pil 80'	Girimri Stadium, Pyongyang	
15	25 October 1933	1st Kyung-Pyong; Regular Football Series	Pyongyang FC	2–1	Kyungsung FC	Lee Jeong-sik 14' (pen.); Park Young-hwan 54'	Choi Seong-son 87'	Girimri Stadium, Pyongyang	
16	6 April 1934	2st Kyung-Pyong; Regular Football Series	Kyungsung FC	1–2	Pyongyang FC	Choi Seong-son 65'	Park Ui-hyeon 55'; Lee Jeong-sik 59'	Paichai High School, Kyungsung	
17	7 April 1934	2st Kyung-Pyong; Regular Football Series	Kyungsung FC	2–2	Pyongyang FC	Han Gab-seok 35'; Choi Seong-son 60'	Kim Sung-gan 64'; Lee Jeong-sik 80'	Paichai High School, Kyungsung	
18	13 April 1935	3rd Kyung-Pyong; Regular Football Series	Kyungsung FC	0–0	Pyongyang FC	—	—	Kyungsung Stadium, Kyungsung	
19	15 April 1935	3rd Kyung-Pyong; Regular Football Series	Kyungsung FC	0–1	Pyongyang FC	—	Han Young-taek 46'	Kyungsung Stadium, Kyungsung	
20	25 March 1946	Jayu Shinmun; Kyung-Pyong Football Series	Seoul FC	2–1	Pyongyang FC	Unknown		Dongdaemun Stadium, Seoul	
21	27 March 1946	Jayu Shinmun; Kyung-Pyong Football Series	Seoul FC	1–3	Pyongyang FC	Unknown		Dongdaemun Stadium, Seoul	

== Other matches ==
Date	Competition	Home team	Score	Away team	Goals (home)	Goals (away)	Venue	Ref.
14 May 1935	1st All Joseon Football Championship	Kyungsung FC	1–0	Pyongyang FC	Bae Jong-ho 65'	—	Kyungsung Stadium, Kyungsung	
10 November 1939	Joseon FA; Three Regions League	Kyungsung FC	5–0	Pyongyang FC	Kim Sung-gan 30', 87'; Hwang Jeong-ha 33', 44'; Kim Yong-sik 52' (pen.)	—	Kyungsung Stadium, Kyungsung	
12 November 1939	Joseon FA; Three Regions League	Kyungsung FC	1–3	Pyongyang FC	Song Chang-yeop 9'	Yang Won-bo 55', 75'; Hyeon Hyo-seop 87'	Kyungsung Stadium, Kyungsung	
13 November 1939	Joseon FA; Three Regions League	Kyungsung FC	3–1	Pyongyang FC	Kim Sung-gan 9', 59'; Kim In-mo 20'	Yang Won-bo 23'	Kyungsung Stadium, Kyungsung	

== Statistics ==
Team	Series				Matches						
Team	Pld	W	D	L	Pld	W	D	L	GF	GA	GD
Kyungsung FC	8	1	3	4	25	8	7	10	47	47	0
Pyongyang FC	8	4	3	1	25	10	7	8	47	47	0

== See also ==
- Kyungsung FC
- Pyongyang FC
- All Joseon Football Tournament
- North Korea–South Korea football rivalry
