= Football in South Korea =

- Seoul World Cup Stadium in 2020
- Country: South Korea
- Governing body: Korea Football Association
- National teams: Senior team; Under-23 team; Under-20 team; Under-17 team; Universiade team; Futsal team
- National teams (women): Senior team; Under-20 team; Under-17 team; Universiade team
- Nicknames: Taegeuk Warriors; Taegeuk Ladies; Red Devils
- Clubs: List of men's clubs; List of women's clubs

National competitions
- K League 1; K League 2; K3 League; K4 League; Korea Cup; WK League

Club competitions
- FIFA Club World Cup; AFC Champions League Elite; AFC Champions League Two; AFC Women's Champions League

International competitions
- FIFA World Cup; FIFA Women's World Cup; AFC Asian Cup; AFC Women's Asian Cup

Football in South Korea is run by the Korea Football Association. The association administers the national football team as well as the K League. Football is the most popular sport in South Korea. Approximately 67% of the people in South Korea are interested in football.

== Beginning ==
In ancient times, Silla, one of Three Kingdoms of Korea, had a ball game called "Chuk-guk" (축국; 蹴鞠). Though Chukguk is similar to today’s football in many aspects, it features the distinctive rule that the ball should stay in the air during game play with the net also being mounted at a fixed distance above the ground. However, Koreans first saw the present version of football in 1882 when British crew members played a game while their vessel, HMS Flying Fish, was visiting the Port of Jemulpo.

After the establishment of a football team at Paichai Academy in Seoul in 1902, there was a footballing boom throughout Korea. The football was adopted as a physical education course at National Seoul Foreign Language School in 1904, and the first senior football match in Korea was contested between Korea Sports Club and Korea YMCA at Seoul Dongdaemun Stadium in 1905. The first Korean national football tournament, named All Joseon Football Tournament, was held by the Joseon Sports Council in 1921 after many football clubs and school football teams were formed since the 1910s including unofficial national team Joseon FC. The Joseon Referees' Association was created in 1928, and was reorganised as the Joseon Football Association (currently Korea Football Association) in 1933. The creation of Joseon FA led to the establishment of several prominent clubs on the peninsula as Korean football began to enter a different form. Kyungsung FC and Pyongyang FC, founded around the same time in the two biggest cities of Korea, made deep impressions at the All Joseon Tournament, and developed a strong rivalry followed by an intercity football series. Kyungsung FC also became the only Korean club to win the Emperor's Cup in Japan.

== Main articles ==
- History of the South Korea national football team
- List of Korea Cup winners
- South Korean football league system
- List of South Korean football champions
- K League

== Relationships with English football ==
Since Tottenham Hotspur signed South Korean striker Son Heung-min in 2015, the club has been the most supported English Premier League club in South Korea. Previously, Manchester United was the most popular club in South Korea due to South Korean former midfielder Park Ji-sung. In 2020, a poll of South Koreans aged 16 to 69 found that 21.4% of respondents supported Tottenham Hotspur, compared to just 6.1% who supported Manchester United. In 2024, a survey of football fans from eight countries across the Americas, Asia and Europe found that 42.3% of South Korean football fans were Tottenham Hotspur supporters.

== Attendances ==
The average attendance per top-flight football league season and the club with the highest average attendance:

Season	League average	Best club	Best club average	Variable
2025	10,081	FC Seoul	23,185	—
2024	11,003	FC Seoul	27,838	—
2023	10,733	FC Seoul	22,633	—
2022	4,820	FC Seoul	8,786	—
2021	1,949	Jeonbuk Hyundai Motors	4,341	—
2020	535	Jeonbuk Hyundai Motors	1,201	(Note: The COVID-19 pandemic started.)
2019	8,013	FC Seoul	17,061	—
2018	5,444	Jeonbuk Hyundai Motors	11,907	—
2017	5,471	FC Seoul	14,338	—
2016	7,872	FC Seoul	18,007	—
2015	7,720	Jeonbuk Hyundai Motors	17,413	—
2014	7,931	Suwon Samsung Bluewings	19,608	—
2013	7,656	Suwon Samsung Bluewings	17,689	(Note: The K League was divided into the first and second divisions.)
2012	6,767	FC Seoul	20,502	—
2011	11,297	FC Seoul	27,815	(Note: A match-fixing scandal broke at the K League.)
2010	10,942	FC Seoul	30,849	—
2009	11,226	Suwon Samsung Bluewings	18,583	—
2008	12,901	Suwon Samsung Bluewings	23,817	—
2007	11,871	Suwon Samsung Bluewings	25,194	—
2006	10,021	Suwon Samsung Bluewings	22,438	—
2005	11,251	Incheon United	23,436	—
2004	11,352	Suwon Samsung Bluewings	20,990	—
2003	9,064	Daejeon Citizen	19,082	—
2002	15,839	Suwon Samsung Bluewings	23,962	(Note: South Korea hosted the 2002 FIFA World Cup.)
2001	11,847	Bucheon SK	19,471	—
2000	9,761	Suwon Samsung Bluewings	15,424	—
1999	13,283	Suwon Samsung Bluewings	19,931	—
1998	14,673	Busan Daewoo Royals	26,995	—
1997	7,142	Jeonnam Dragons	13,873	—
1996	9,595	Suwon Samsung Bluewings	14,816	(Note: The K League introduced the decentralization policy.) (Note: South Korea was chosen to host the 2002 FIFA World Cup.)
1995	9,246	Hyundai Horang-i	11,795	—
1994	7,791	POSCO Atoms	14,033	—
1993	8,989	POSCO Atoms	14,447	—
1992	11,886	POSCO Atoms	15,577	—
1991	12,251	POSCO Atoms	14,572	—
1990	5,865	POSCO Atoms	8,590	—
1989	6,483	POSCO Atoms	10,925	—
1988	6,011	POSCO Atoms	14,917	—
1987	4,267	Daewoo Royals	5,260	(Note: The K League started to operate the home and away system instead of the national tour system.)
1986	3,922	POSCO Atoms	4,471	—
1985	5,393	Hanil Bank	9,250	—
1984	9,190	POSCO Dolphins	12,180	—
1983	20,974	Daewoo Royals	23,140	(Note: The K League's inaugural season was held.)

== One-club men ==
The following players played for only one professional club for 10 or more seasons without a transfer or loan to another professional club (excluding semi-professional or amateur club).

Player	Professional club	Career	Seasons	League appearances	Ref.
Kim Poong-joo	Busan Daewoo Royals	1983–1996	12	159	
Lee Tae-ho	Daewoo Royals	1983–1992	10	170	
Chung Yong-hwan	Daewoo Royals	1984–1994	11	150	
Yoo Dong-kwan	Pohang Atoms	1986–1995	10	186	
Gong Moon-bae	Pohang Steelers	1987–1998	12	225	
Song Ju-seok	Ulsan Hyundai Horang-i	1990–1999	10	195	
Lee Young-sang	Pohang Steelers	1990–1999	10	187	
Park Tae-ha	Pohang Steelers	1991–2001	10	189	
Kim Tae-young	Jeonnam Dragons	1995–2005	11	199	
Choi Jin-cheul	Jeonbuk Hyundai Motors	1996–2007	12	240	
Kim Jin-woo	Suwon Samsung Bluewings	1996–2007	12	197	
Lee Jung-hyo	Busan IPark	1999–2008	10	165	
Hwang Ji-soo	Pohang Steelers	2004–2017	12	270	
Go Yo-han	FC Seoul	2006–2023	18	353	

== Retired numbers ==
Professional club	No.	Player	Career	League appearances	Ref.
Busan Daewoo Royals	16	Kim Joo-sung	1987–1992, 1994–1999	198	
FC Seoul	13	Go Yo-han	2006–2023	353	
Jeonbuk Hyundai Motors	20	Lee Dong-gook	2009–2020	349	
Jeonbuk Hyundai Motors	25	Choi Chul-soon	2006–2012, 2014–2025	374	
Suwon Samsung Bluewings	38	Yoon Sung-hyo	1996–1998, 2000	53	

== See also ==
- Football in Seoul
- Women's football in South Korea
