= Kim Sung-gan =

South Korean footballer (1912–1984)

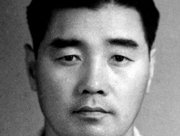
- Kim in 1972

Personal information
- Full name: Kim Sung-gan
- Date of birth: 17 November 1912
- Place of birth: Pyongyang, Heian'nan-dō, Korea, Empire of Japan
- Date of death: 29 May 1984 (aged 71)
- Place of death: Springfield, Illinois, United States
- Position: Forward

Youth career
- Kwangsung Middle School
- 1928–1930: Soongsil Middle School

College career
Years	Team	Apps	(Gls)
1932	Soongsil College		
1934–1940	Yonhi College		

Senior career*
Years	Team	Apps	(Gls)
1933	Pyongyang FC		
1933	Korean Students in Japan		
1934	Joseon FC		
1934–1939	Kyungsung FC		

International career
1940	Japan	1	(0)

Managerial career
- 1956: South Korea
Medal record
Men's football
Representing South Korea (as manager)
AFC Asian Cup
Winner	1956 Hong Kong
- * Club domestic league appearances and goals

Kim Sung-gan (Korean: 김성간, 17 November 1912 – 19 May 1984) was a South Korean football player and manager. He played 5 matches for the Japan national team when Korea was ruled by Japan, including 1 official match. He was the manager of the South Korean football team that won the 1956 AFC Asian Cup.

== Playing career ==
Born in Pyongyang (known at the time as "Heijō"), Kim started playing football when he was in elementary school. He played mostly for Yonhi College and Kyungsung FC after graduating from middle school. He won the 1935 Emperor's Cup, while playing for Kyungsung FC. He also played for Japan national team in five matches from 1939 to 1940 including one official match.

== Managerial career ==
Kim became a coach and an executive of the Korean FA after retiring as a player, and led South Korea to become inaugural champions at the AFC Asian Cup when being appointed manager.

== Personal life ==
Kim played soft tennis and basketball for a short while in early life. He participated in the All Joseon Soft Tennis Tournament in 1927, while playing soft tennis at Suncheon Shinsung Middle School. He played for basketball team "Nongwoo" (which meant "Basketball Friends") in the Pyongyang Basketball League in 1933 before transferring to Yonhi College.

Kim's son Kim Yeong-il was a Korean national basketball player, who participated in two Summer Olympics and won two major Asian titles (1969 ABC Championship and 1970 Asian Games). Yeong-il was found dead with his blood and head wounds near a railway on 23 May 1976.

Kim died on 29 May 1984, in a traffic collision in the United States.

== Career statistics ==
=== International ===
Appearances and goals by national team and year
National team	Year	Apps	Goals
Japan	1940	1	0

== Honours ==
=== Player ===
Kyungsung FC

- Emperor's Cup: 1935
- Meiji Shrine Games: 1935

=== Manager ===
South Korea

- AFC Asian Cup: 1956
