= Park Kyu-chung =

South Korean footballer (1924–2000)

Park Kyu-chung 박규정
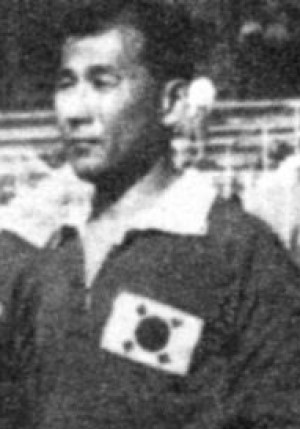

Personal information
- Date of birth: 21 April 1915
- Place of birth: Korea under Japanese rule
- Date of death: 2000 (aged 84–85)
- Position: Defender

Youth career
- 1931–1933: Kwangseong High School
- 1934–1938: Boseong College

Senior career*
Years	Team	Apps	(Gls)
1939–1940	Pyongyang FC		
1946	Kyungsung FC		
1947–1949	Joseon Electric		
- ROK Army

International career
- South Korea

Managerial career
- 1959: South Korea U-20
- 1961–1962: ROK Army OPMG (Coach)
- 1962: South Korea B (Coach)
- 1966: South Korea U-20
- 1968: Yangzee FC (Coach)
- 1971–1973: Korea Trust Bank
- * Club domestic league appearances and goals

Park Kyu-chung (Korean: 박규정; Hanja: 朴奎禎; 21 April 1915 – 2000) was a South Korean football defender who played for the South Korea in the 1948 Summer Olympics and the 1954 FIFA World Cup.

Park was the first player in the history of the FIFA World Cup at the age of 39+ to play in matches. On 17 June 1954, he played in a match against Hungary at the age of 39 years 57 days. Stanley Matthews (England) participated in the game England - Belgium at the age of 39 years 136 days on the same day, but with a little late.
