= Kim Yong-sik =

South Korean footballer (1910–1985)

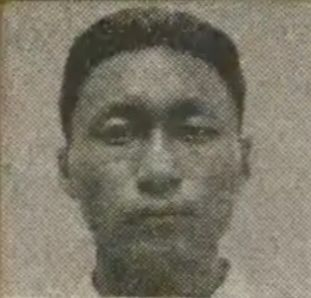
- Kim Yong-sik in 1936

Personal information
- Full name: Kim Yong-sik
- Date of birth: 25 July 1910
- Place of birth: Sinchon, Hwanghae, Korean Empire
- Date of death: 8 March 1985 (aged 74)
- Place of death: Seoul, South Korea
- Height: 1.72 m (5 ft 7 1/2 in)
- Position: Defensive midfielder

Youth career
- Kyungshin High school

College career
Years	Team	Apps	(Gls)
1930–1931	Soongsil College		
1932–1937	Bosung College		
1937	Waseda University		

Senior career*
Years	Team	Apps	(Gls)
1933–1940	Kyungsung FC		
1934	Joseon FC		
1940–1942	Pyongyang FC		
1946–1947	Seoul FC		
1946–1950	Joseon Electrical Industry		
1950–1952	ROK Army		

International career
1936–1940	Japan	3	(0)
1948–1950	South Korea	3	(1)

Managerial career
- 1953: South Korea
- 1954: South Korea
- 1959: South Korea
- 1960–1961: South Korea
- 1968–1969: Yangzee
- 1969: South Korea
- 1970: Korea Trust Bank
- 1981–1982: Hallelujah FC
Medal record
Men's football
Representing South Korea (as manager)
AFC Asian Cup
Winner	1960 South Korea
- * Club domestic league appearances and goals

- Kim Yong-sik
- Hangul: 김용식
- Hanja: 金容植
- RR: Gim Yongsik
- MR: Kim Yongsik

Kim Yong-sik (Korean: 김용식; Hanja: 金容植; 25 July 1910 – 8 March 1985) was a South Korean football player and manager. He is esteemed as the godfather of the South Korean football.

== International career ==
Kim played international football for both Japan and South Korea. When Korea was ruled by Japan, Kim was the only Korean footballer called up to the Japan national team for the Summer Olympics. He contributed to Japan's victory by assisting the winning goal in the first round of the 1936 Summer Olympics against Sweden. After the Olympics, Kim joined Waseda University which had many of Japan's national players, but he went back to Korea after experiencing discrimination against Koreans.

Kim could participate in the Olympics as a Korean player after the end of the Japanese occupation. He achieved the first-ever victory of South Korean football against Mexico as a player-coach in the 1948 Summer Olympics.

== Style of play ==
Kim had a fast pace, elaborate techniques, and high work capacity that most footballers need. Japan could not ignore his abilities; he was called up to the Japan national team. He played as a centre-half, but he was a playmaker who took part in the attack.

== Managerial career ==
Kim managed South Korean national team in the 1954 FIFA World Cup and the 1960 AFC Asian Cup after his retirement. He led his country to an Asian Cup title.

== Personal life ==
Kim was diligent and only absorbed in football. He completely avoided harmful things to the human body, and had a passion for training. His healthy habits made him continue his playing career until the age of forty.

== Career statistics ==
=== International ===
Appearances and goals by national team and year
National team	Year	Apps	Goals
Japan	1936	2	0
Japan	1940	1	0
Japan	Total	3	0
South Korea	1948	2	0
South Korea	1950	1	1
South Korea	Total	3	1
Career total		6	1

Appearances and goals by competition
Competition	Apps	Goals
Friendlies	2	1
Summer Olympics	4	0
Total	6	1

List of international goals scored by Kim Yong-sik
No.	Date	Venue	Cap	Opponent	Score	Result	Competition
1	15 April 1950	Hong Kong	6	Hong Kong	1–0	6–3	Friendly

== Managerial statistics ==
Managerial record by team and tenure
Team	From	To	Record					Ref.
Team	From	To	Pld	W	D	L	Win %	Ref.
South Korea	April 1953	May 1953	5	3	1	1	60.00	
South Korea	May 1954	June 1954	2	0	0	2	0.00	
South Korea	November 1959	December 1959	2	1	0	1	50.00	
South Korea	September 1960	June 1961	5	5	0	0	100.00	
South Korea	September 1969	October 1969	4	1	2	1	25.00	
Career total			18	10	3	5	55.56	

== Honours ==
=== Player ===
Soongsil College

- All Joseon Football Tournament: 1931

Kyungsung FC

- All Joseon Football Tournament: 1936
- Emperor's Cup: 1935
- Chōsen Shrine Games: 1935
- Meiji Shrine Games: 1935

Joseon Electrical Industry

- Korean National Championship: 1949

Individual

- Korean FA Hall of Fame: 2005

=== Manager ===
South Korea

- AFC Asian Cup: 1960

Yangzee

- Korean National Championship: 1968
- Asian Champion Club Tournament runner-up: 1969
