= Kim Hwa-jip =

South Korean footballer and manager (1905–2006)

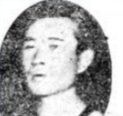
- Kim Hwa-jip in 1928

Personal information
- Date of birth: 26 May 1909
- Place of birth: Korean Empire
- Date of death: 8 July 2006 (aged 97)
- Place of death: Seoul, South Korea
- Position: Defender

Youth career
- Pai Chai High School
- Boseong College

Senior career*
Years	Team	Apps	(Gls)
1929–1932	Kyungsung FC		

Managerial career
- 1952–1954: South Korea
- * Club domestic league appearances and goals

- Kim Hwa-jip
- Hangul: 김화집
- Hanja: 金和集
- RR: Gim Hwajip
- MR: Kim Hwajip

Kim Hwa-jip (Korean: 김화집; Hanja: 金和集; 26 May 1905 – 8 July 2006) was a South Korean football player and manager.

He was one of seven winners of the South Korea Football Hall of Fame, along with Kim Yong-sik, Hong Deok-young, Lee Hoe-taik, Cha Bum-kun, Guus Hiddink, and Chung Mong-joon.
