= Meiji-za (Keijō) =

Theatre in Seoul, Korea, 1936 to 1973

- 明治座
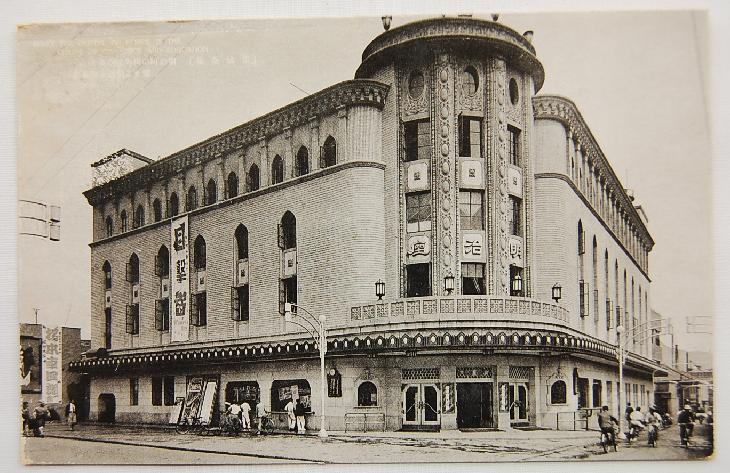
- The building in 1937
- Interactive map of Meiji-za
- Alternative names: Myeongdong Theater (successor)

General information
- Location: Keijō (Seoul), South Korea (Empire of Japan)
- Coordinates: 37.5638°N 126.9843°E
- Named for: Emperor Meiji
- Opened: October 7, 1936
- Closed: 1973

Technical details
- Floor count: 4

Other information
- Seating capacity: 1,100

Meiji-za (Japanese: 明治座; Korean: 명치좌; RR: Myeongchi-jwa) was a theater in Keijō (Seoul), Korea, Empire of Japan. It opened on October 7, 1936, and was located in Myeong-dong. Upon the liberation of Korea in 1945, the theater became owned by Koreans. It was renamed a number of times until it closed in 1973 and was used as an office building. It reopened in 2009 as Myeongdong Theater, which still operates today.

== History ==
The theater was named for the Japanese Emperor Meiji. It had one underground floor and four above-ground floors that could seat 1,100 people. It mainly catered to Japanese settlers in Korea, and showed mainly Japanese-language productions. The building's design was inspired by that of famous theater in Japan Taishokwan.

After the liberation of Korea in 1945, the theater was renamed in January 1946 to International Theater (Korean: 국제극장; RR: Gukje Geukjang). It was renamed again in December 1947 to Shigonggwan (시공관), and began screening movies. On June 1, 1957, it was renamed to Myeongdong Arts Center (명동예술회관), and in 1962 it was again renamed to Myeongdong National Theater (명동국립극장). It closed in 1973, as a new national theater opened at Namsan. The building was sold to a financial company and used as an office. The building was in danger of being demolished for a long period of time after that, but a movement arose in the performing arts community to preserve it. As part of these efforts, the building was purchased by the Ministry of Culture, Sports and Tourism in 2009, and it reopened as Myeongdong Theater on June 5, 2009.
