= Football in Seoul =

Football is one of the most popular sports, both in terms of participants and spectators, in Seoul. It hosted several of South Korea's leading football clubs and has the biggest football stadium in the country, the Seoul World Cup Stadium.

== History ==
Football was introduced to Koreans by the crew of the Royal Navy's HMS Flying Fish in the Port of Incheon in June 1882, and it was adopted as a physical education course at National Seoul Foreign Language School in 1904. The first senior football match in Korea was contested between Korea Sports Club and Korea YMCA at Seoul Dongdaemun Stadium in 1905.

In 1902, after the establishment of a football team at Paichai Academy in Seoul, there was a footballing boom throughout Korea. Many football clubs and school football teams were formed in the 1910s, including Bulgyo Cheongnyeonhoe (불교청년회, Buddhist Youth Club), Geongang Gurakbu (건강구락부, Health Club) and Joseon Football Club (조선축구단) in Seoul. The football clubs in Seoul usually had rivalries against the clubs in Pyongyang, the second biggest city in Korea. Kyungsung FC, named according to Seoul's name at the time, was formed in 1933 and became the only Korean club to win the Emperor's Cup in Japan.

== Clubs ==
Clubs in bold are still active.

| Club | Division | Stadium |
|---|---|---|
| Kyungsung FC (1933–1945); Seoul FC (1946–1950) | — | Seoul Stadium |
| Seoul City (1976–2003) | Korean Semi-professional League; Korea National League | Mokdong Stadium |
| Yukong Elephants (1983–1986, 1991–1995) | K League | Dongdaemun Stadium |
| Ilhwa Chunma (1989–1995) | K League | Dongdaemun Stadium |
| Lucky-Goldstar Hwangso (1990); LG Cheetahs (1991–1995); **FC Seoul** (2004–present) | K League 1 | Dongdaemun Stadium (1990–1995); Seoul World Cup Stadium (2004–present) |
| **Seoul WFC** (2004–present) | WK League | Hyochang Stadium (2015–2019); Mokdong Stadium (2020–2021); Seoul World Cup Auxiliary Stadium (2022–present) |
| Seoul United (2007–2018); Seoul Nowon United (2019–2024) | K3 League (2007–2019); K4 League | Seoul Olympic Stadium (2007–2009); Hyochang Stadium (2009–2010); Nowon Madeul Stadium (2011–2024) |
| Eunpyeong Chunggoo Sungsim Hospital (2007); Seoul Pabal (2008) | K3 League (2007–2019) | Eunpyeong Public Football Field |
| Nowon Hummel (2008–2009) | Korea National League | Nowon Madeul Stadium |
| Seoul FC Martyrs (2009–2015) | K3 League (2007–2019) | Gangbuk Civic Stadium |
| **Seoul E-Land** (2015–present) | K League 2 | Seoul Olympic Stadium (2015–2022); Mokdong Stadium (2022–present) |
| Jungnang Chorus Mustang (2012–2016); **Seoul Jungnang** (2017–present) | K3 League (2007–2019); K4 League | Jungnang Public Grass Stadium |

Locations of stadiums in Seoul

== Honours ==
Only champions located in Seoul are counted.

| Type | Competition | Total | Club | Titles |
|---|---|---|---|---|
| Domestic | K League 1 | 8 | FC Seoul | 5 (1990, 2010, 2012, 2016, 2026) |
| Domestic | K League 1 | 8 | Ilhwa Chunma | 3 (1993, 1994, 1995) |
| Domestic | Korean National Semipro League (Spring) | 3 | Seoul City | 3 (1978, 1980, 1988) |
| Domestic | Korean National Semipro League (Autumn) | 2 | Seoul City | 2 (1985, 1989) |
| Domestic | K3 League | 1 | Seoul United | 1 (2007) |
| Domestic | Korea Cup | 1 | FC Seoul | 1 (2015) |
| Domestic | Korean National Championship | 3 | Seoul City | 3 (1980, 1982, 1986) |
| Domestic | Korean League Cup | 3 | FC Seoul | 2 (2006, 2010) |
| Domestic | Korean League Cup | 3 | Ilhwa Chunma | 1 (1992) |
| International | Asian Club Championship | 1 | Ilhwa Chunma | 1 (1995) |

== Derbies in Seoul ==
=== Dongdaemun derby ===
In the 1980s, South Korean baseball felt that marketing in Seoul was important for the popularity of the KBO League, so it set up two baseball clubs at Dongdaemun Baseball Stadium in Seoul. On the other hand, the K League only superficially assigned locations to its clubs and, until the mid-1980s, ordered all clubs to visit all stadiums in order instead of a home-and-away system. The K League allowed three clubs to settle at Dongdaemun Stadium after adopting a home-and-away system; however, the clubs left Seoul in 1996 to comply with the K League decentralization policy.

From 1990 to 1995, the Dongdaemun derby was contested between three clubs, namely Ilhwa Chunma, LG Cheetahs and Yukong Elephants. The rivalry at Dongdaemun Stadium received attention despite its short period and the great popularity of baseball. Two of the derbies were the 1992 Korean League Cup finals between Ilhwa Chunma and LG Cheetahs, and ended in Ilhwa's victory.

Dongdaemun derby records
| Team | Pld | W | D | L | GF | GA | Ilhwa | LG | Yukong |
|---|---|---|---|---|---|---|---|---|---|
| Ilhwa Chunma (1990–1995) | 76 | 30 | 29 | 17 | 97 | 81 | — | 15W, 14D, 13L; 56GF, 52GA | 15W, 15D, 4L; 41GF, 29GA |
| Lucky-Goldstar Hwangso (1990); LG Cheetahs (1991–1995) | 76 | 24 | 26 | 26 | 92 | 95 | 13W, 14D, 15L; 52GF, 56GA | — | 11W, 12D, 11L; 40GF, 39GA |
| Yukong Elephants (1991–1995) | 68 | 15 | 27 | 26 | 68 | 81 | 4W, 15D, 15L; 29GF, 41GA | 11W, 12D, 11L; 39GF, 40GA | — |

=== Seoul derby ===
Seoul E-Land was founded in April 2014, and entered the K League 2 the next year. It originally played its home matches at Seoul Olympic Stadium, and moved to Mokdong Stadium in 2022. E-Land could not play FC Seoul in the league due to the failure of its promotion before meeting FC Seoul in the third round of the 2021 Korean FA Cup on 14 April 2021. The first derby between the two clubs ended in E-Land's 1–0 win at Seoul World Cup Stadium.

== Relationships with other cities ==
=== Suwon ===
Suwon Samsung Bluewings had a rivalry with Anyang LG Cheetahs since its foundation, and the rivalry was further developed after LG Cheetahs returned to Seoul with the name of FC Seoul. It became one of the most popular derbies at the K League, and was named the Super Match.

=== Incheon ===
Seoul and Incheon are the two biggest cities in the Seoul Metropolitan Area, and the football rivalry between them was naturally formed. The match between FC Seoul and Incheon United is called the Gyeongin derby. The violent incidents are often caused by both supporters whenever the derby is finished. As of 2024, FC Seoul leads the all-time series with 28 wins, 22 draws and 18 losses.

=== Anyang ===
In 2004, Anyang LG Cheetahs returned to Seoul, their hometown before the decentralization policy, and was renamed FC Seoul. The club's relocation brought itself into conflict with Anyang fans, who started to call it insulting nickname "Bukpae", which means Northern Immorality (Bukjjok-eui Paeryun). The government of Anyang founded its football club FC Anyang in 2013, and joined the K League 2 that year. On 19 April 2017, the first match between two clubs was held in the round of 32 of the 2017 Korean FA Cup, and Seoul defeated Anyang 2–0. Their rivalry attracted attention again after Anyang was promoted to the K League 1 in 2025.

== See also ==
- Football in South Korea
