= Al-Quds Derby =

Annual football competition in Palestinian

- Location: (Palestine) Jerusalem
- Teams: Hilal Al-Quds; Jabal Al-Mukaber
- First meeting: 13 March 2007
- Stadiums: Faisal Al-Husseini International Stadium, Al-Ram

Statistics
- Total meetings: 32
- Most wins: Hilal Al-Quds (14)
- All-time series: Hilal Al-Quds: 14; Draw: 10; Jabal Al-Mukaber: 8
- Largest victory: Hilal Al-Quds 4–0 Jabal Al-Mukaber; 2011–12 West Bank Premier League; Jabal Al-Mukaber 4–0 Hilal Al-Quds; 2023–24 West Bank Premier League
- Largest goal scoring: Jabal Al-Mukaber 2–4 Hilal Al-Quds; 2021–22 West Bank Premier League (5 March 2022)

The Al-Quds derby refers to the football matches between the Palestinian Clubs Hilal Al-Quds and Jabal Al-Mukaber. Matches are played in the Faisal Al-Husseini International Stadium. The teams have met on 32 separate occasions, 26 of which were in the league, 2 in the Yasser Arafat Cup, 2 in the Palestine Cup and 2 Exhibition game (one in the Al-Quds and Al-Karameh Championship and one in the Winter Jerico Championship). Hilal Al-Quds has been the more dominant side in the derby, with 14 wins, while Jabal Al-Mukaber won 8 times.

== Statistics ==
=== Overall match statistics ===
As of 25 August 2023

Competition	Matches	Wins		Draws	Goals	
Competition	Matches	HAQ	JAM	Draws	HAQ	JAM
West Bank Premier League	26	11	8	7	34	26
Palestine Cup	2	2	0	0	3	0
Yasser Arafat Cup	2	1	0	1	3	2
Friendly game	2	0	0	2	0	0
Total	32	14	8	10	40	28

=== Honours ===
Hilal Al-Quds leads Jabal Al-Mukaber in terms of official overall trophies. Hilal Al-Quds have 4 domestic league titles compared to 2 for Jabal Al-Mukaber. Currently none of Hilal Al-Quds or Jabal Al-Mukaber have won a continental trophy.

Jabal AM	Competition	Hilal AQ
Domestic
2	West Bank Premier League	4
3	Yasser Arafat Cup	2
0	West Bank Cup	3
0	West Bank Super Cup	4
0	Palestine Cup	1
5	Aggregate	14

== Records ==
=== Results ===
==== Biggest wins (3+ goals) ====
Team	Result	Date	Competition
Jabal	4–0	25 August 2023	West Bank Premier League
Hilal	4–0	2 September 2011	West Bank Premier League

==== Longest undefeated runs ====
Club	Games	Period	Wins	Draws
Jabal	4	10 September 2022 – Now	3	1
Hilal	9	5 March 2010 – 1 February 2013	5	4
