= Uniformed derby =

- Other names: Home United vs. Warriors
- Location: Singapore
- Teams: Home United; Warriors
- Latest meeting: 4 August 2016; Home United 3-0 Warriors; 2016 S.League
- Next meeting: TBA
- Stadiums: Bishan Stadium; Choa Chu Kang Stadium

Statistics
- Total meetings: 24
- Most wins: Home United (25 wins)
- All-time series (S.League only): Home United: 5 Drawn: 2 Warriors: 2
- Largest victory: Warriors 0-4 Home United (2011)
- Longest win streak: 2 games (Home United)

Uniformed derby is the name given to football matches that involves Home United and Warriors FC. The derby started since the 90's as both are quite successful teams in Singapore.

== History ==
Home United FC was founded in 1940 and its current head coach is Aidil Sharin. Its actual name was Police FC for the Singapore Police Force and changed to the current name in 1997 as it includes HomeTeam departments of the Singapore Ministry of Home Affairs such as the Singapore Civil Defence Force and the Immigration and Checkpoints Authority.

Warriors FC was founded in 1975 and its current head coach is Razif Onn. They were previously known as the Singapore Armed Forces Football Club (SAFFC) since their establishment on 16 February 1996.

== Stadiums ==
| Team Name | Stadium | Capacity | Image |
|---|---|---|---|
| Home United | Bishan Stadium | 6,254 | |
| Warriors | Choa Chu Kang Stadium | 4,268 | |

== List of matches ==
From 2009 to current

| # | Date | Home team | Away team | Score | Goals (Home) | Goals (Away) |
|---|---|---|---|---|---|---|
| 1 | 4 March 2009 | Warriors | Home United | 3-1 | Ahmad Latiff 39', Daniel Bennett 61', John Wilkinson 92', | Shi Jiayi 50' (pen.) |
| 2 | 30 May 2009 | Home United | Warriors | 2-1 | Ludovick Takam 62', Peres Spindula De Oliveira 85' | Park Tae-won 70' |
| 3 | 21 August 2009 | Warriors | Home United | 0-2 | | Rosman Sulaiman 41', Ludovick Takam 47' |
| 4 | 6 May 2010 | Home United | Warriors | 1-1 | Shahril Ishak 8' | Federico Martinez 14' (pen.) |
| 5 | 16 July 2010 | Warriors | Home United | 2-5 | John Wilkinson 53', Park Tae-won 66' (pen.) | Shahril Ishak 9', 40', 63', Woo Keun-jun 46', Shahdan Sulaiman 93' |
| 6 | 10 November 2010 | Home United | Warriors | 0-0 | | |
| 7 | 7 April 2011 | Warriors | Home United | 2-0 | Ivan Jerkovic 69' (pen.), Indra Sahdan 84' | |
| 8 | 6 July 2011 | Home United | Warriors | 3-2 | Mendy Frederic 28', Qiu Li 47', Firdaus Idros 83' | Mislav Karoglan 45' (pen.), Fazrul Nawaz 86' |
| 9 | 16 October 2011 | Warriors | Home United | 0-4 | | Sherif EL-Masri 4', 18', Firdaus Idros 16', Yasir Hanapi 91' |
| | 22 April 2017 | Warriors | Home United | 2-2 | Shahril Ishak 81' (pen.), 87' | Stipe Plazibat 6' (pen.), 49' |

== Honours ==
Honours counted for the S.League, Singapore Cup, Singapore League Cup and the Singapore Community Shield.

| Team | League | | Cup | | | | Grand Total |
| Team | S.League | League Total | Singapore Cup | Singapore League Cup | Singapore Community Shield | Cup Total | Grand Total |
|---|---|---|---|---|---|---|---|
| Home United | 2 | 2 | 6 | 0 | 0 | 6 | 8 |
| Warriors | 9 | 9 | 4 | 0 | 3 | 7 | 16 |
