= Wui Hye-deok =

South Korean football officer

- Hangul: 위혜덕
- RR: Wi Hyedeok
- MR: Wi Hyedŏk

Wui Hye-deok (Korean: 위혜덕) is a former director of Korea Football Association. He performed a role of the director at the 1960 AFC Asian Cup, but posthumously received the AFC Asian Cup winning coaches award in 2010.
