= All Joseon Football Tournament =

- Organiser(s): Joseon Sports Council (1921–1937); Joseon Football Association (1938–1940)
- Founded: 1921
- Abolished: 1940
- Region: Korea, Empire of Japan
- Most championships: Yonhi College (3 titles)

The All Joseon Football Tournament (Korean: 전조선축구대회; Hanja: 全朝鮮蹴球大會) was the first Korean national football competition, held annually by the Joseon Sports Council or Joseon Football Association. It was founded in 1921 and was annually held in Gyeongseong (Keijō) with four divisions according to age. (senior, college, middle-high school, elementary school) The Pyongyang YMCA and Kwanso Sports Council also annually held a tournament with the same name for the same period (1921–1942) in Pyongyang (Heijō), but the popularly known competition is Gyeongseong's tournament.

From 1927 to 1931, the Korean college clubs participated in the senior division, because the college division was temporarily abolished during the time, and they showed overwhelming performances against senior clubs by winning all of the five editions. Since 1934, it was merged into the All Joseon Sports Festival, and was contested with other sports. However, Joseon Sports Council was forcibly disbanded by Japan in 1938, and the Sports Festival was also abolished at the time. The Joseon Football Association became the new host institution to keep the tournament, but it was finally abolished in 1940.

== Senior division ==
=== Finals ===
Season	Champions	Score	Runners-up	Ref.
Sports Council tournament (1921–1937)
1921	Ceased due to violence between players			
1922	Muo FC	3–0	Youth Buddhist Club	
1922+	Youth Buddhist Club	2–0	Health Club	
1923	Youth Buddhist Club	3–1	Imsul FC	
1924	Health Club	6–3	Suyang Club	
1925	Joseon FC	3–2	Goryeo Club	
1926	Muo FC	3–2	Joseon FC	
1927	Yonhi College	7–0	Joseon FC	
1928	Yonhi College	3–0	Bosung College	
1929	Bosung College	3–1	Yeonu Club	
1930	Yonhi College	3–2 (a.e.t.)	Bosung College	
1931	Soongsil College	3–1	Yonhi College	
1932	Chongjin FC	Round-robin	Gyerim FC	
1933	Joseon FC	2–1	Kyungsung FC	
1934	Pyongyang FC	3–1	Joseon FC	
1935	Chongjin FC	3–0	Railway FC	
1936	Kyungsung FC	4–2	Suncheon FC	
1937	Seoul FC (1930s)	2–0	Dongbang FC	
FA tournament (1938–1940)
1938	Hamhung FC	4–0	Kyungsung FC	
1939	Railway FC	3–2 (a.e.t.)	Kyungsung FC	
1940	Majang FC	1–0	Seonil FC	

=== Titles by club ===
Club	Champions	Runners-up	Seasons won
Yonhi College	3	1	1927, 1928, 1930
Joseon FC	2	3	1925, 1933
Youth Buddhist Club	2	1	1922+, 1923
Muo FC	2	0	1922, 1926
Chongjin FC	2	0	1932, 1935
Kyungsung FC	1	3	1936
Bosung College	1	2	1929
Health Club	1	1	1924
Railway FC	1	1	1939
Soongsil College	1	0	1931
Pyongyang FC	1	0	1934
Seoul FC (1930s)	1	0	1937
Hamhung FC	1	0	1938
Majang FC	1	0	1940

== See also ==
- Football in South Korea
- Korean National Sports Festival
- All Joseon Football Championship
