= U Jeong-hwan =

South Korean footballer (1921–1953)

Personal information
- Date of birth: 16 July 1921
- Place of birth: Seoul, South Korea
- Date of death: 1953 (aged 38–39)

International career
Years	Team	Apps	(Gls)
- South Korea

U Jeong-hwan (16 July 1921 – 1953) was a South Korean footballer. He competed in the men's tournament at the 1948 Summer Olympics.
