= Yasser Arafat Cup =

Palestinian football cup competition

The Yasser Arafat Cup is an association football cup competition held for football clubs in the West Bank. The cup is overseen by the Palestinian Football Association and was founded in 2011. The cup is named after Yasser Arafat, the president of the Palestinian National Authority who died in 2004.
