= Bae Jeong-ho =

South Korean footballer

Personal information
- Date of death: 16 January 1963

International career
Years	Team	Apps	(Gls)
- South Korea

Bae Jeong-ho (date of birth unknown, died 16 January 1963) was a South Korean footballer. He competed in the men's tournament at the 1948 Summer Olympics.
