= K League decentralization policy =

The K League decentralization policy in 1995 was a policy of moving K League clubs located in Seoul to other regions. It was an effort by the Government of South Korea and the K League Federation to increase popularity of football nationwide before the 2002 FIFA World Cup for which they bid. In accordance with it, the three K League clubs, Yukong Elephants, Ilhwa Chunma and LG Cheetahs, moved from Seoul to Bucheon, Cheonan and Anyang, respectively, in 1996.

== Overview ==
By 1995, there had been three professional football clubs based in Seoul: Ilhwa Chunma, LG Cheetahs and Yukong Elephants. K League Federation wanted to spread football popularity nationally and secure football-specific stadiums for bidding of 2002 FIFA World Cup. In order to achieve this goal, K League and Blue House forced all three clubs in Seoul to move to other cities. The intention was to compensate for the decreased number of home cities under the new system.

This policy was not proceeded smoothly with the clubs affected by it, and brought resistances from them. K League Federation announced that if the clubs don't accept the decision, they will be excluded from the league. The federation also decided that one club among them could get the priority to return to Seoul, if it would build a football-specific stadium in Seoul. Then all three clubs agreed to move. Once the plan was announced, many city governments hoped to attract these clubs.

== Details ==
=== Yukong Elephants ===
At first, Yukong Elephants threatened K League that they would dissolve the club if they have to move out of Seoul. However, they took Bucheon's offer to give a new 20,000-seater Bucheon Stadium and another football-specific stadium including two training fields. They decided to use Seoul Mokdong Stadium as their temporary home ground until the construction of Bucheon Stadium to be completed. They changed their name to Bucheon Yukong as a part of the policy on 4 January 1996.

=== Ilhwa Chunma ===
Cheonan promised Ilhwa Chunma that they would change the Cheonan Oryong Stadium into a football-specific stadium by paying ₩1.2 billion and would build another sports complex. Ilhwa accepted the offer, moved to Cheonan, and changed its name to Cheonan Ilhwa Chunma as a part of the policy on 29 March 1996.

=== LG Cheetahs ===
LG Cheetahs was regarding to move to Changwon as well, but decided to move to Anyang due to the popularity of football in the region and the local characteristics. They changed their name to Anyang LG Cheetahs as a part of the policy on 26 April 1996.

== Aftermath ==
K League started perfect "home and away system" from 1996 after all clubs got their own stadiums as a result.

After the 2002 FIFA World Cup, Korea Football Association needed to pay Seoul Metropolitan Government ₩25 billion as their share of the construction of Seoul World Cup Stadium. KFA wanted to find a new club in Seoul and let the club to pay the whole share, but it didn't happen. Seoul Metropolitan Government understood that potential investment on a new Seoul club had not made due to the amount of the share, they agreed to cut ₩10 billion in the way of sponsoring the new team with the same amount of money. Also, KFA agreed to pay ₩10 billion of their share to reduce the burden to a new Seoul club, leaving only ₩5 billion to pay.

In the meantime, Anyang LG Cheetahs declared their interest in moving to Seoul and Seoul Metropolitan Government welcomed it, though KFA prioritized the foundation of a new club. But many candidate companies (including KT Corporation and Kumho Asiana Group), which received proposal from KFA and K League, refused to found a new Seoul-based club. On 6 February 2004, K League Federation officially allowed the existing K League club's move to Seoul and sent relocation proposal to all K League clubs. KFA declared that if an existing club wants to move to Seoul, they need to pay ₩15 billion, due to the KFA's ₩10 billion offer was only under the condition of foundation of a new club. A few days later, however, KFA cut the share to pay to a half, ₩7.5 billion, with a prospect of a new Seoul club in future to pay the other half.

Busan I'Cons also had declared their interest in being a new Seoul club, but later retreated their interest. Anyang LG Cheetahs finally returned to Seoul on 10 March 2004.
