= 1935 Emperor's Cup =

Tournament details
- Country: Japan

Final positions
- Champions: Seoul Shukyu-dan
- Runners-up: Tokyo Bunri University
- Semifinalists: Kansai University Club; Nagoya Commercial College

Statistics of Emperor's Cup in the 1935 season.

== Overview ==
It was contested by 6 teams, and Seoul Shukyu-dan won the championship.

== Results ==
=== Quarterfinals ===
- Tokyo Bunri University 4–2 Hokkaido University
- Kansai University Club 4–2 Sendai S.C.

=== Semifinals ===
- Tokyo Bunri University 3–0 Kansai University Club
- Seoul Shukyu-dan 6–0 Nagoya Commercial College

=== Final ===
- Tokyo Bunri University 1–6 Seoul Shukyu-dan

Seoul Shukyu-dan won the championship.
