= Kyungsung FC =

1933–1950 South Korean football club

Kyungsung FC 경성 축구단
- Full name: Kyungsung Football Club; Seoul Football Club (since 1946)
- Founded: 1933
- Dissolved: 1950–1953 / During Korean War
- Ground: Kyungsung Stadium
- Capacity: 16,000
- Chairman: Lyuh Woon-hyung
Home colours

Kyungsung Football Club was the Korean football club based in the city of Seoul. The term Kyungsung (Keijō) was used instead of Seoul during the period of Japanese rule. After independence from Japan, the club revived and changed the name to Seoul FC in 1946. Due to the North Korean invasion, the club stopped operating.

When Korea was under Japanese rule, Kyungsung FC participated in Japanese Emperor's Cup and won the prize, becoming the only non-Japanese home islands club to win it.

== History ==
Kyungsung FC was founded in 1933 and Kyungsung FC is a historic club of Korean football.

== Honours ==
- All Joseon Football Tournament
  - Winner (2) : 1936
  - Runners-up (3) : 1933, 1938, 1939
- Emperor's Cup
  - Winner (1) : 1935
- Meiji Shrine Games
  - Winner (1) : 1935 Football at the Meiji Shrine Games

== Rivalry ==
Rival was Pyongyang FC. Rival match was famous and called Kyung-Pyong Football Match

== See also ==
- Football in Seoul
- Pyongyang FC
- Kyungsung FC–Pyongyang FC rivalry
- Kim Yong-sik
