= Meiji Shrine Games =

Sport event

The Meiji Shrine Games (明治神宮競技大会, meidjijingū kyōgi taikai) were a national sporting event held in Japan 14 times between 1924 and 1943.
