= Names of Seoul =

Names for the current South Korean capital

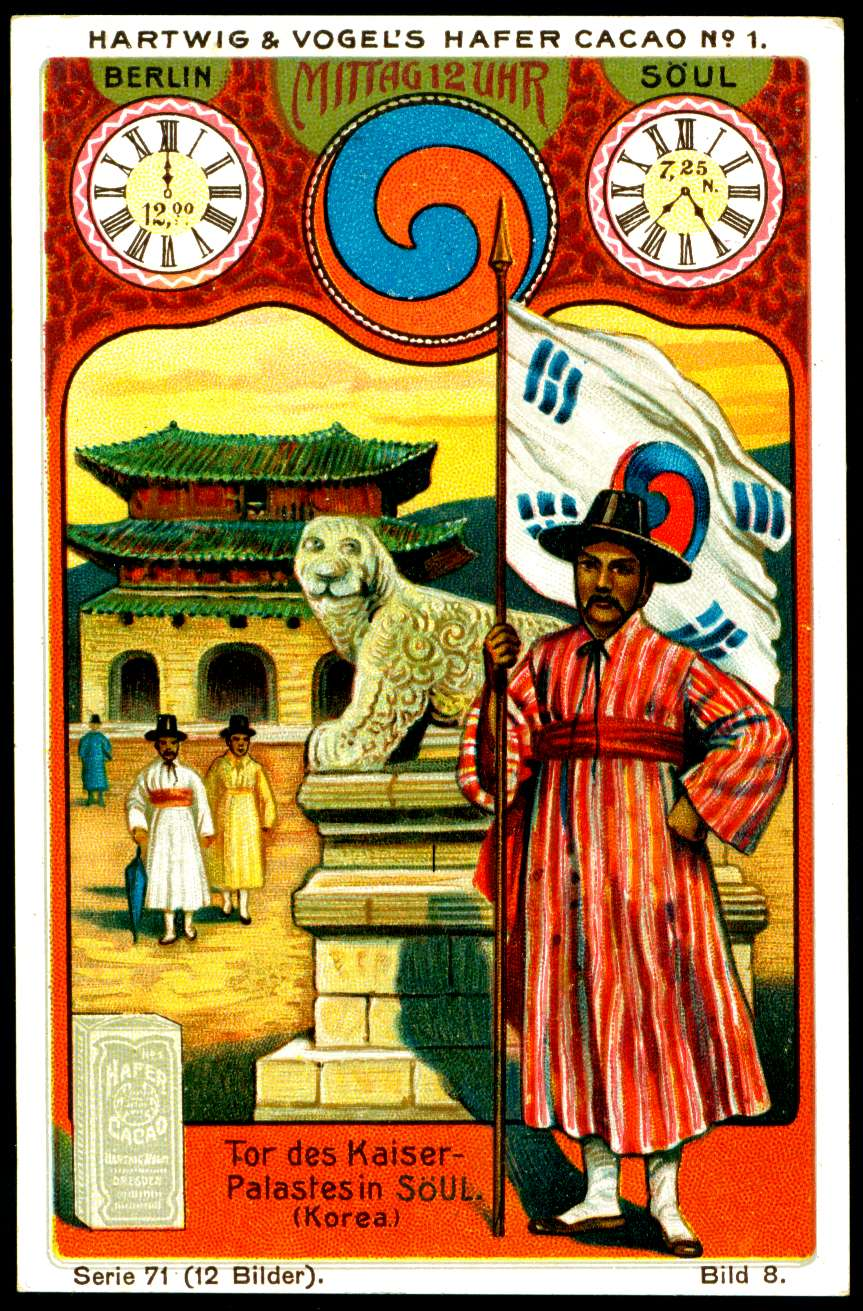
An early 20th century trading card from Germany, using an alternate spelling of Seoul, with "ö" for "eo".

Seoul, the capital of South Korea, has been called by a number of formal and informal names over time. The word seoul was originally a common noun that simply meant "capital city", and was used colloquially to refer to the capital throughout Korean history. Seoul became the official name of the South Korean capital after its liberation from Japan after the Second World War.

Historically, the city of what is now Seoul has been called in various names, including Wiryeseong, Bukhansangun, Hanyang, Namgyeong, Hanyangbu, Hanseong, Gyeongseong, and Keijō.

== Etymology of "Seoul" ==
The name Seoul (서울; IPA: /səˈul/), was originally an old native Korean common noun meaning "capital city." It is believed to have originated from Seorabeol (서라벌; 徐羅伐), which originally referred to Gyeongju, the capital of Silla, which was then called Geumseong (금성; 金城). Seorabeol, which also appears in old texts as "Seonabeol" (서나벌; 徐那伐), "Seobeol" (서벌; 徐伐) or "Seoyabeol" (서야벌; 徐耶伐), is theorized to have originated from the word seora (which comes from an ancient word meaning "high and holy") and beol (which means "field").

== History ==
During the Korean Three Kingdoms Period, the first kingdom to conquer the Han River basin, which is home to the city that is now modern-day Seoul, was Baekje (18 BC – 660 AD). In 18 A.D., King Onjo of Baekje built the kingdom's capital of Wiryeseong (위례성; 慰禮城), which was located inside the boundaries of modern-day Seoul. The fortress was also called Hanseong (한성; 漢城).

In 475, Goguryeo (37 BC – 668 AD) forces under King Jangsu attacked Wiryeseong. Upon conquering the Baekje capital, Goguryeo established the commandery of Bukhansan (Bukhansangun; Korean: 북한산군; Hanja: 北漢山郡) in the regions surrounding the city. Bukhansangun was also called Nampyeongyang (Korean: 남평양; Hanja: 南平壤; lit. 'South Pyeongyang').

The city was called Hanyang in the Northern and Southern States period (698–926), and Namgyeong (남경; 南京) in the Goryeo period (918–1392).

The city was called Hanyangbu (한양부; 漢陽府) under Goryeo (1270–1356), and Hanseong (한성; 漢城) or Hanyang (한양; 漢陽) in the Joseon period (1392–1897).

During the Joseon era, it started to be called Seoul by the public. In the middle of Joseon era, Hanseong and Hanyang were almost replaced by Seoul and remained only formal names. During the period of Japanese colonial rule, Seoul was referred to by the Japanese exonym Keijō (京城), or the Korean reading of that name Gyeongseong. After World War II and Korea's liberation, the city officially adopted its current name.

== Gyeongseong ==
- Gyeongseong
- Hangul: 경성
- Hanja: 京城
- RR: Gyeongseong
- MR: Kyŏngsŏng

"Gyeongseong" is a Sino-Korean word for "capital city". Gyeong (경; 京) means "capital" and seong (성; 城) means "walled city". It was in occasional use to refer to Seoul throughout the Joseon dynasty, having earlier referred to the capitals of Goryeo and Silla. The term came into much wider use during the period of Japanese rule because it is also the Korean form of Keijō (京城), the former Japanese name, which was used for Seoul during the colonial rule. The name "Keijō" for "Seoul" remained in use in Japan for about a decade after the end of World War II. From the 1960s onwards, "Seoul" (ソウル - Souru) gained currency at the request of the South Korean government, and is the most commonly-used Japanese name today, with "Keijō" being relegated to historical or academic use only.

Seoul was called "Hanseong" (漢城) or "Hanyang" (漢陽) during the Joseon dynasty but the city's main railway station, Seoul Station, opened with the name "Gyeongseong Station" (京城驛) in 1900, which it retained until 1905. It was then called Gyeongseong Station again from 1923 to 1947, when it assumed its current name.

Gyeong is still used to refer to Seoul (as the "capital") in the names of various railway lines and freeways, including:

- Gyeongbu Line (경부선; 京釜線) and Gyeongbu Expressway between Seoul and Busan;
- Gyeongin Line (경인선; 京仁線) and Gyeongin Expressway between Seoul and Incheon;
- Gyeongui Line (경의선; 京義線) between Seoul and Dorasan (the ui comes from Sinuiju, the line's original terminus in North Korea on the Chinese border);
- Gyeongwon Line (경원선; 京元線) between Seoul and Baengmagoji (originally the line went to Wonsan in what is now North Korea); and
- Gyeongchun Line (경춘선; 京春線) between Seoul and Chuncheon in Gangwon Province.

== Chinese characters for "Seoul" ==
Unlike most other place names in Korea, "Seoul" has no corresponding Hanja (Chinese characters used to write the Korean language). This has caused problems in translating between Chinese and Korean, as Chinese terms for Korean places often are a direct reading of the Hanja names. Until recently, some Chinese sources used the older name "Hanseong" (한성; 漢城) to refer to Seoul, as that term does have corresponding Hanja.

However, this led to some confusion. For example, the name of Seoul National University (서울대학교; 서울大學校) would be rendered as "Hanseong University", but there already is a university that goes by that exact reading in Chinese: Hansung University (한성대학교; 漢城大學校).

Beginning in 2005, the Seoul City Government under Lee Myung-bak designated a new Chinese term for Seoul: Chinese: 首爾; Chinese: 首尔; pinyin: Shǒu'ěr. The name was chosen by a select committee out of two names, the other being 首午爾; Shǒuwu'ěr.

The chosen name is a close transliteration of Seoul in Mandarin Chinese; 首 (shǒu) can also mean "first" or "capital". For some time after the name change, Chinese-language news media have used both names interchangeably during their publications or broadcasts, 首爾 [漢城] in print and 首爾, 以前的漢城 (lit. 'Shou'er, formerly Hancheng') in television and radio.

The change was intended for Chinese speakers only, and has no effect on the Korean language name. The new name would be written and pronounced 수이; Sui in Korean. Some linguists criticize the selection of the new name, claim that its pronunciation in Korean bears no resemblance to the native name at all, and state that its intended representation of the Korean pronunciation is effective in Mandarin but is lost in other Sinitic languages, such as in Cantonese, in which the name is pronounced "sau2 yi5", or in Shanghainese, in which the new name (首爾) is pronounced "sew2 el3." Those critics have said that the names "西蔚" or "徐蔚" (the latter being the ancient name of Seoul) would have been much more effective in representing the city's Korean name.

== European cartography ==
On a 1751 map of China and Korea prepared in France, Seoul was marked as "King-Ki-Tao, Capitale de la Corée", using an approximation of the Chinese pronunciation of Gyeonggi Province (京畿道). The use of "King-Ki-Tao" to refer to Seoul was repeated on a 1851 John Rapkin and John Tallis map of both Japan and Korea.

== See also ==
- History of Seoul
