= Keijō =

Seoul during Japanese rule

Keijō-fu 京城府
- Former administrative district of Korea, Empire of Japan
- Emblem of Keijo

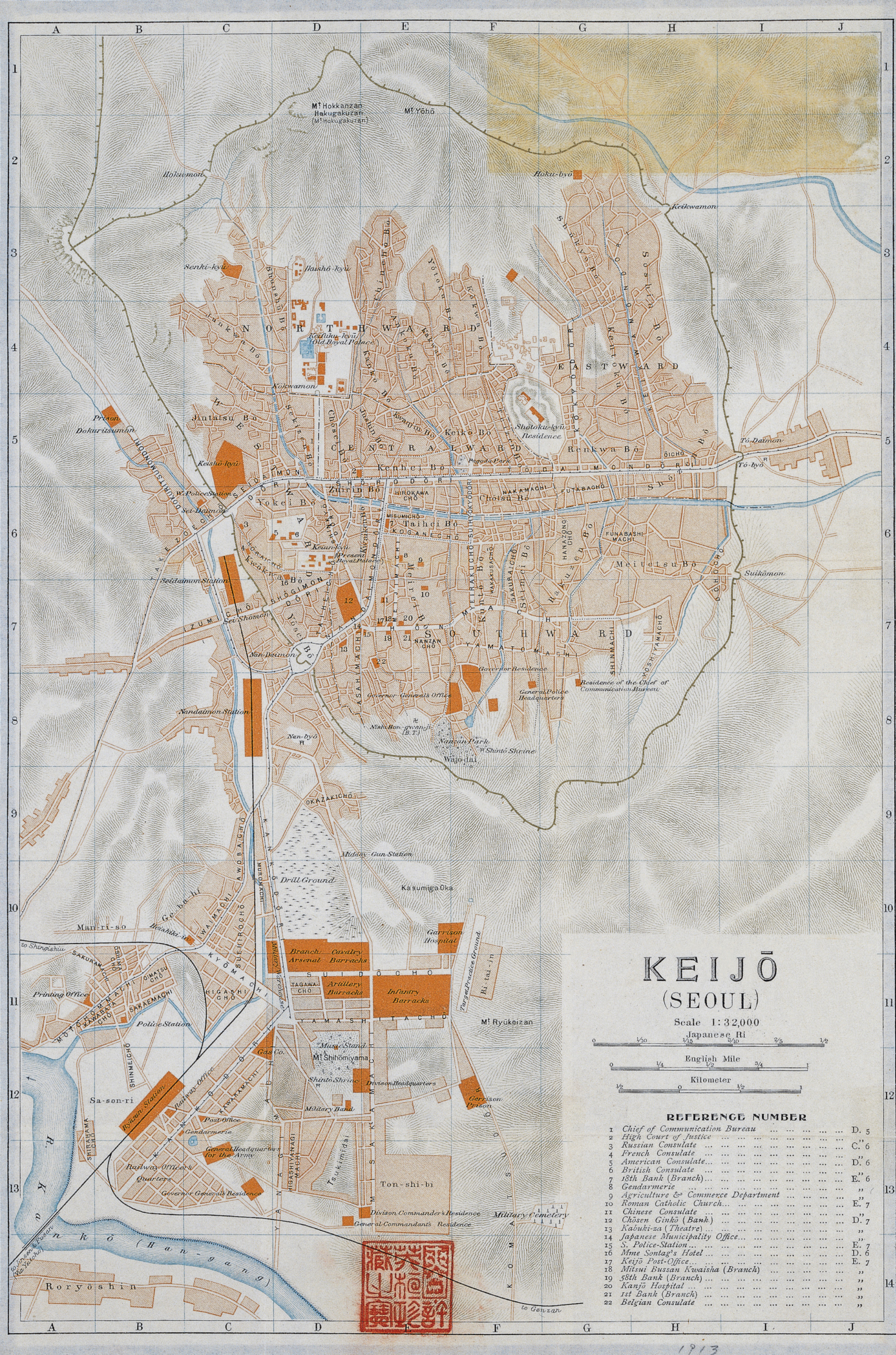
- English map of Keijō made by Imperial Japanese Government Railways in 1913
- Population
  - 1940: 1,142,000
- Today part of: South Korea

Keijō

Japanese name
- Kanji: 京城府
- Hiragana: けいじょうふ
- Romanization: Keijō-fu

Korean name
- Hangul: 경성부
- Hanja: 京城府
- Revised Romanization: Gyeongseong-bu
- McCune–Reischauer: Kyŏngsŏng-bu

Keijō (Japanese: 京城), or Gyeongseong (Korean: 경성), was an administrative district of Korea under Japanese rule that corresponds to the present Seoul, the capital of South Korea.

The name "Keijō" for "Seoul" remained in use in Japan for about a decade after the end of World War II. From the 1960s onwards, "Seoul" (ソウル - Souru) gained currency at the request of the South Korean government, and is the most commonly-used Japanese name today, with "Keijō" being relegated to historical or academic use only.

== History ==
When the Empire of Japan annexed the Korean Empire, it made Seoul the colonial capital. While under colonial rule (1910–1945), the city was called Keijō (京城; 경성; Gyeongseong; Kyŏngsŏng, literally meaning "capital city" in Hanja.). Keijō was an urban city (부; 府) that had two wards: Keijō itself and Ryusan-ku (龍山區, 용산구, りゅうさんく). Gyeongseong was part of Gyeonggi Province, instead of being an independent city or prefecture as in Joseon and present days. In 1914, several outer districts of the prefecture were annexed to neighboring Goyang County (now Goyang City), reducing the administrative size of the prefecture. In 1936, Gyeongseong expanded itself as it annexed Yeongdeungpo from Siehung County (now Siehung City) and recombined some parts of former Gyeongseong districts (Sungin, Yeonghee, etc.) from Goyang County. The Government-General Building served as the seat of the colonial government of Colonial Korea but was torn down in 1995.

=== Honmachi ===
The central district of Gyeongseong was Honmachi, present-day Chungmu-ro.

== Demographics ==
Population of Keijō (1910–1940)
Year	Population
1910	197,000
1920	251,000
1930	677,000
1940	1,142,000

== See also ==
- Names of Seoul
