= Pyongyang Football Club =

Pyongyang FC 평양 축구단
- Full name: Pyongyang Football Club
- Founded: 1933
- Dissolved: 1950–1953 / During Korean War
- Ground: Kim Il-sung Stadium
Home colours

Pyongyang Football Club was a North Korean football club based in the city of Pyongyang, which is now the capital of North Korea. The club won the national cup competition in 1934.

== Background ==
Pyongyang FC was founded on 15 January 1933 following an inaugural meeting in Pyongyang. The club achieved early success winning the All Joseon Football Tournament in 1934 by defeating Joseon FC in the final that was held at the Kyungsung Stadium. This tournament was the national cup competition of the then unified country of Korea before the Korean War. The club's home ground was the 20,000 capacity Kirimri Stadium which is now known as the Kim Il-sung Stadium. The stadium held the annual Kyung-Pyong Football Match between Kyungsung FC and Pyongyang FC during the 1930s.

Pyongyang FC was the highest ranked club in Pyongyang during the latter stages of Japanese colonial rule up to 1945 and the club still existed after the Soviet liberation. However, the club was disbanded during the Korean War of 1950–53. The club's most famous player was Park Kyu-Chong who went on to play for the South Korea national team and was in the squad for the 1954 FIFA World Cup.

== Honours ==
- All Joseon Football Tournament
  - Winner (1) : 1934

== Rivalry ==
Rival was Kyungsung FC. Rival match was famous and called Kyung-Pyong Football Match

== See also ==
- Kyungsung FC
- Kyungsung FC–Pyongyang FC rivalry
