= Netherlands at the 1948 Summer Olympics =

- Flag of the Netherlands
- IOC code: NED
- NOC: Dutch Olympic Committee

in London
- Competitors: 149 in 18 sports
- Flag bearer: Wim Landman
- Medals Ranked 11th: Gold 5 Silver 2 Bronze 9 Total 16

Summer Olympics appearances (overview)
- 1900; 1904; 1908; 1912; 1920; 1924; 1928; 1932; 1936; 1948; 1952; 1956; 1960; 1964; 1968; 1972; 1976; 1980; 1984; 1988; 1992; 1996; 2000; 2004; 2008; 2012; 2016; 2020; 2024; 2028

Other related appearances
- 1906 Intercalated Games

The Netherlands competed at the 1948 Summer Olympics in London, England. 149 competitors, 115 men and 34 women, took part in 74 events in 18 sports.

== Medalists ==
| Medal | Name | Sport | Event | Date |
|---|---|---|---|---|
| Gold | Fanny Blankers-Koen | Athletics | Women's 100 metres | 2 August |
| Gold | Nel van Vliet | Swimming | Women's 200 metre breaststroke | 2 August |
| Gold | Fanny Blankers-Koen | Athletics | Women's 80 metres hurdles | 4 August |
| Gold | Fanny Blankers-Koen | Athletics | Women's 200 metres | 6 August |
| Gold | Fanny Blankers-Koen; Gerda van der Kade-Koudijs; Xenia Stad-de Jong; Netti Witziers-Timmer | Athletics | Women's 4 × 100 metres relay | 6 August |
| Silver | Alida van der Anker-Doedens | Canoeing | Women's K-1 500 metres | 12 August |
| Silver | Gerrit Voorting | Cycling | Men's individual road race | 13 August |
| Bronze | Willem Slijkhuis | Athletics | Men's 5000 metres | 2 August |
| Bronze | Marie-Louise Linssen-Vaessen | Swimming | Women's 100 metre freestyle | 2 August |
| Bronze | Willem Slijkhuis | Athletics | Men's 1500 metres | 6 August |
| Bronze | Irma Heijting-Schuhmacher; Marie-Louise Linssen-Vaessen; Margot Marsman; Hannie Termeulen | Swimming | Women's 4 × 100 metre freestyle relay | 6 August |
| Bronze | Netherlands men's national water polo team: Cor Braasem; Hennie Keetelaar; Nijs Korevaar; Joop Rohner; Frits Ruimschotel; Piet Salomons; Frits Smol; Hans Stam; Ruud van Feggelen | Water polo | Men's tournament | 7 August |
| Bronze | Abraham Charité | Weightlifting | Men's +82.5 kg | 11 August |
| Bronze | Koos de Jong | Sailing | Firefly | 12 August |
| Bronze | Bob Maas; Eddy Stutterheim | Sailing | Star | 12 August |
| Bronze | Netherlands men's national field hockey team: André Boerstra; Henk Bouwman; Piet Bromberg; Harry Derckx; Han Drijver; Dick Esser; Wim van Heel; Roepie Kruize; Jenne Langhout; Ton Richter; Dick Loggere; Eddy Tiel | Field hockey | Men's tournament | 13 August |

== Athletics ==
Men's competition

- Hans Houtzager
- Jan Kleyn
- Jan Lammers
- Jef Lataster
- Nico Lutkeveld
- Jan Meijer
- Frits de Ruijter
- Gabe Scholten
- Wim Slijkhuis
- Jan Zwaan
- Jo Zwaan

Women's competition

- Fanny Blankers-Koen
- Elly Dammers
- Grietje de Jongh
- Gerda van der Kade-Koudijs
- Neeltje Karelse
- Ans Koning
- Ans Panhorst-Niesink
- Nel Roos-Lodder
- Xenia Stad-de Jong
- Jo Teunissen-Waalboer
- Netty Witziers-Timmer

== Boxing ==
Men's flyweight

- Appie Corman (=5th)

Men's featherweight

- Moos Linneman (=17th)

Men's lightweight

- Jan Remie (=17th)

Men's welterweight

- Frits Wijngaard (Note: also known as Frits Van Kempen) (=17th)

Men's middleweight

- Jan Schubart (=5th)

Men's light heavyweight

- Hennie Quentemeijer (=17th)

== Cycling ==
Nine cyclists, all men, represented the Netherlands in 1948.

Individual road race

- Henk Faanhof
- Evert Grift
- Piet Peters
- Gerrit Voorting

Team road race

- Henk Faanhof
- Evert Grift
- Piet Peters
- Gerrit Voorting

Sprint

- Jan Hijzelendoorn

Time trial

- Theo Blankenauw

Tandem

- Klaas Buchly
- Tinus van Gelder

Team pursuit

- Theo Blankenauw
- Henk Faanhof
- Joop Harmans
- Gerrit Voorting

== Diving ==
Women

| Athlete | Event | Final | |
| Athlete | Event | Points | Rank |
|---|---|---|---|
| Cobie Floor | 3 m springboard | 83.14 | 12 |
| Kiki Heck | 3 m springboard | 87.61 | 8 |

== Fencing ==
Nine fencers, seven men and two women, represented the Netherlands in 1948.

Men's foil

- Henny ter Weer
- Johannes Zoet
- Eddy Kuijpers

Men's team foil

- Willem van den Berg, Henny ter Weer, Frans Mosman, Eddy Kuijpers

Men's épée

- Roelof Hordijk

Men's sabre

- Frans Mosman
- Willem van den Berg
- Eddy Kuijpers

Men's team sabre

- Henny ter Weer, Antoon Hoevers, Willem van den Berg, Frans Mosman, Eddy Kuijpers

Women's foil

- Mary Meyer-van der Sluis
- Anja Secrève

== Hockey ==
=== Men's team competition ===
==== Group C ====
| Rank | Team | Pld | W | D | L | GF | GA | Pts | (Pakistan) | (Netherlands) | (Belgium) | (France) | (Denmark) |
|---|---|---|---|---|---|---|---|---|---|---|---|---|---|
| 2. | Netherlands | 4 | 3 | 0 | 1 | 11 | 8 | 6 | 1:6 | X | 4:1 | 2:0 | 4:1 |

==== Semi-finals ====
| India | 2 – 1 | Netherlands |

==== Bronze medal match ====
| Netherlands | 1 – 1 | Pakistan |
| Netherlands | 4 – 1 | Pakistan |

=== Team roster ===
André Boerstra
Henk Bouwman
Piet Bromberg
Harry Derckx
Han Drijver
Dick Esser
Roepie Kruize
Jenne Langhout
Dick Loggere
Ton Richter
Eddy Tiel
Wim van Heel

== Rowing ==
The Netherlands had six male rowers participate in two out of seven rowing events in 1948.

Men's double sculls

- Tom Neumeier
- Henk van der Meer

Men's coxless four

- Hein van Suylekom
- Sietze Haarsma
- Han Dekker
- Han van den Berg (1925–2015)

== Shooting ==
Four shooters represented the Netherlands in 1948.

25 metre pistol

- Paulus Kessels

50 metre rifle

- Jan Hendrik Brussaard
- Geurt Schoonman
- Christiaan Both

== Swimming ==
Men

| Athlete | Event | Heat | | Semifinal | | Final | |
| Athlete | Event | Time | Rank | Time | Rank | Time | Rank |
|---|---|---|---|---|---|---|---|
| Kees Kievit | 100 m backstroke | 1:10.8 | 2 Q* | 1:11.3 | 7* | Did not advance | |
| Bob Bonte | 200 m breaststroke | 2:48.7 | 9 Q | 2:47.0 | 7 Q | 2:47.6 | 8 |

*Ranks given are within the heat.

Women

| Athlete | Event | Heat | | Semifinal | | Final | |
| Athlete | Event | Time | Rank | Time | Rank | Time | Rank |
|---|---|---|---|---|---|---|---|
| Irma Heijting-Schuhmacher | 100 m freestyle | 1:07.9 | 5 Q | 1:07.7 | 4 Q | 1:08.4 | 6 |
| Marie-Louise Linssen-Vaessen | 100 m freestyle | 1:07.5 | 4 Q | 1:08.4 | 5 Q | 1:07.6 | 3rd place, bronze medalist(s) |
| Hannie Termeulen | 100 m freestyle | 1:09.8 | 19 | Did not advance | | | |
| Dicky van Ekris | 100 m backstroke | 1:19.3 | 12 Q | 1:18.2 | 7 q | 1:18.9 | 6 |
| Greetje Gaillard | 100 m backstroke | 1:18.2 | 5 Q | 1:18.4 | 8 q | 1:19.1 | 8 |
| Ria van der Horst | 100 m backstroke | 1:18.7 | 7 Q | 1:18.2 | 5 Q | 1:18.8 | 5 |
| Janny de Groot | 200 m breaststroke | 3:04.4 | 3 Q* | 3:01.4 | 2 Q* | 3:06.2 | 5 |
| Tonnie Hom | 200 m breaststroke | 3:06.0 | 2 Q* | 3:05.7 | 4 q* | 3:07.5 | 7 |
| Nel van Vliet | 200 m breaststroke | 2:57.4 OR | 1 Q* | 2:57.0 OR | 1 Q* | 2:57.2 | 1st place, gold medalist(s) |
| Irma Heijting-Schuhmacher; Margot Marsman; Marie-Louise Linssen-Vaessen; Hannie Termeulen | 4 × 100 m freestyle relay | 4:31.3 | 1 Q* | —N/a | | 4:31.6 | 3rd place, bronze medalist(s) |

*Ranks given are within the heat.

== Water polo ==
=== Men's team competition ===
- Preliminary round (Group C)

- Defeated India (12-1)
- Defeated Chile (14-0)

- Second round (Group C)

- Defeated Spain (5-2)

- Semi final round (Group A)

- Drew with Belgium (3-3)
- Defeated Sweden (5-3)

- Final round

- Drew with Hungary (4-4)
- Lost to Italy (2-4) → Bronze medal

- Team roster

- Cor Braasem
- Ruud van Feggelen
- Hennie Keetelaar
- Nijs Korevaar
- Joop Rohner
- Frits Ruimschotel
- Piet Salomons
- Frits Smol
- Hans Stam
