= Swimming at the 1948 Summer Olympics – Women's 100 metre backstroke =

Women's 100 metre backstroke at the Games of the XIV Olympiad
- Venue: Wembley Arena
- Date: 3 August 1948 (heats); 5 August 1948 (semifinals & final)
- Competitors: 24 from 16 nations
- Winning time: 1:14.4 OR

Medalists
| 1st place, gold medalist(s) | | Karen Harup; Denmark |
| 2nd place, silver medalist(s) | | Suzanne Zimmerman; United States |
| 3rd place, bronze medalist(s) | | Judy-Joy Davies; Australia |

The women's 100 metre backstroke event at the 1948 Olympic Games took place between 3 and 5 August, at the Empire Pool. This swimming event used the backstroke. Because an Olympic-size swimming pool is 50 metres long, this race consisted of two lengths of the pool.

== Results ==
=== Heats ===
| Rank | Athlete | Country | Time | Notes |
|---|---|---|---|---|
| 1 | Karen Margrethe Harup | Denmark | 1:15.6 | |
| 2 | Judy-Joy Davies | Australia | 1:16.4 | |
| 3 | Suzanne Zimmerman | United States | 1:16.8 | |
| 4 | Ilona Novák | Hungary | 1:17.3 | |
| 5 | Greetje Gaillard | Netherlands | 1:18.2 | |
| 6 | Helen Yate | Great Britain | 1:18.3 | |
| 7 | Ria van der Horst | Netherlands | 1:18.7 | |
| 8 | Muriel Mellon | United States | 1:18.7 | |
| 9 | Ngaire Lane | New Zealand | 1:18.8 | |
| 10 | Monique Berlioux | France | 1:18.8 | |
| 11 | Barbara Jensen | United States | 1:18.8 | |
| 12 | Dicky van Ekris | Netherlands | 1:19.3 | |
| 13 | Cathie Gibson | Great Britain | 1:19.7 | |
| 14 | Beryl Marshall | Argentina | 1:20.9 | |
| 15 | Vera Ellery | Great Britain | 1:20.9 | |
| 16 | Ingegerd Fredin | Sweden | 1:21.2 | |
| 17 | Magda Bruggemann | Mexico | 1:21.4 | |
| 18 | Bea Ballintijn | Norway | 1:22.1 | |
| 19 | Edith de Oliveira | Brazil | 1:22.5 | |
| 20 | Ginette Jany-Sendral | France | 1:22.7 | |
| 21 | Kolbrún Ólafsdóttir | Iceland | 1:25.6 | |
| 22 | Doris Gontersweiler-Vetterli | Switzerland | 1:26.2 | |
| 23 | Joyce Court | Canada | 1:26.8 | |
| 24 | Liliana Gonzalias | Argentina | 1:26.9 | |

=== Semifinals ===
| Rank | Athlete | Country | Time | Notes |
|---|---|---|---|---|
| 1 | Karen Margrethe Harup | Denmark | 1:15.5 | OR |
| 2 | Suzanne Zimmerman | United States | 1:16.8 | Q |
| 3 | Ilona Novák | Hungary | 1:17.6 | Q |
| 4 | Judy-Joy Davies | Australia | 1:17.8 | Q |
| 5 | Ria van der Horst | Netherlands | 1:18.2 | Q |
| 6 | Muriel Mellon | United States | 1:18.2 | Q |
| 7 | Dicky van Ekris | Netherlands | 1:18.2 | q |
| 8 | Greetje Gaillard | Netherlands | 1:18.4 | q |
| 9 | Cathie Gibson | Great Britain | 1:18.6 | |
| 10 | Helen Yate | Great Britain | 1:18.7 | |
| 11 | Ngaire Lane | New Zealand | 1:19.0 | |
| 12 | Barbara Jensen | United States | 1:19.1 | |
| 13 | Monique Berlioux | France | 1:20.2 | |
| 14 | Beryl Marshall | Argentina | 1:20.7 | |
| 15 | Vera Ellery | Great Britain | 1:20.8 | |
| 16 | Ingegerd Fredin | Sweden | DNS | |

=== Final ===
| Rank | Athlete | Country | Time | Notes |
|---|---|---|---|---|
| 1 | Karen Harup | Denmark | 1:14.4 | OR |
| 2 | Suzanne Zimmerman | United States | 1:16.0 | |
| 3 | Judy-Joy Davies | Australia | 1:16.7 | |
| 4 | Ilona Novák | Hungary | 1:18.4 | |
| 5 | Ria van der Horst | Netherlands | 1:18.8 | |
| 6 | Dicky van Ekris | Netherlands | 1:18.9 | |
| 7 | Muriel Mellon | United States | 1:19.0 | |
| 8 | Greetje Gaillard | Netherlands | 1:19.1 | |

Key: OR = Olympic record
