= Constance Meyer =

English American competitive diver

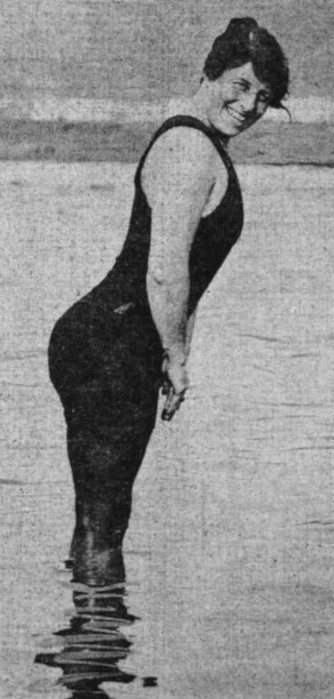
- Meyer, circa 1914

Personal information
- Nickname: "Connie" Meyer
- Nationality: British-American
- Born: Constance C. Ralph; 17 September 1882 St Martin's, England
- Died: 3 January 1967 (aged 84) San Mateo County, California, US
- Years active: 1913–1922
- Spouse(s): William N. Meyer (1900–1919); Lou C. Dressler (1919–1946, his death)

Sport
- Sport: diving
- Club: Multnomah Athletic Club
- Coached by: Jack Cody

Achievements and titles
- Regional finals: 1917
- National finals: 1915, 1917

Constance Cycil Meyer (née Ralph, later Dressler; 17 September 1882 – 3 January 1967) was an English American competitive diver who was the Amateur Athletic Union (AAU) women's champion in 1915 and 1917. She was twice runner-up for the AAU diving title; first in 1916 to Aileen Allen and again in 1918 to Thelma Payne. Meyer lived in Portland, Oregon and was a member of the Multnomah Athletic Club under instructor Jack Cody. She also competed in bowling, golf, ice hockey, swimming, tennis and water polo.

== Biography ==
Meyer was born Constance Cycil Ralph in St Martin's, England on 17 September 1882, to Charles A. Ralph and Theresa Davies. Her family moved to Portland, Oregon during her childhood and she found employment at a box factory in her late teens. On 18 September 1900, she married William N. Meyer at Forbes Presbyterian Church in Portland. The couple had two children, Charles F. Meyer and William R. Meyer.

Meyer first learned how to swim at the Portland YWCA in 1912. She joined the diving and swimming program at the Multnomah Athletic Club in 1913 under the instruction of Jack Cody. In June 1913, she took first place in a 50-yard swim meet. The first competitive diving event Meyer competed in occurred on 23 August 1913, at a swimming meet at Peninsula Park. She took first place in the women's senior diving open, which was open to entrants 16 years and older. Meyer competed in the Multnomah Athletic Club's annual Christmas Day swim meet in 1913, placing second in a 50-yard event. Meyer joined a Multnomah Athletic Club women's water polo team in October 1913. In March 1915, Meyer joined a fledgling women's ice hockey team in Portland.

The Multnomah Athletic Club was invited to send competitors to the Amateur Athletic Union Diving and Swimming Championships in 1915, which were being held in conjunction with the Panama–Pacific International Exposition in San Francisco, California. Meyer was one of three competitors that represented Multnomah. Meyer won the AAU title by default on 19 July 1915, since there were no other entries. Following her AAU title victory, crowds would gather to watch Meyer practice.

In January 1916, Meyer rejoined the Portland women's hockey team and served as team captain. Meyer took up tennis for the first time in June 1916. That month, she was the runner-up in a Multnomah Athletic Club tennis tournament.

Meyer went to the Los Angeles Athletic Club in Los Angeles, California to defend her AAU diving title on 29 June 1916. She had just five days notice before the event and was originally scheduled to play a tennis match in St. Helens, Oregon on the date of the AAU meet. Meyer placed second, with a score of 351 points, to Los Angeles diver Aileen Allen, who scored 370 points. Meyer petitioned the AAU to strip Allen of the title on the grounds she performed at Vaudeville shows and should be considered a professional athlete, but the AAU took no action.

Meyer performed in several diving exhibitions in 1916 including the Astoria Regatta, the Happy Canyon Round-Up in Pendleton, Oregon and Frontier Days in Walla Walla, Washington. During the Multnomah Athletic Club's Christmas Day swim in 1916, Meyer was scheduled to dive from the Morrison Bridge to the Willamette River. If the river was iced over, the club would to perform the third act of Uncle Tom's Cabin, in which Meyer would play "Eliza" crossing the ice on the Willamette.

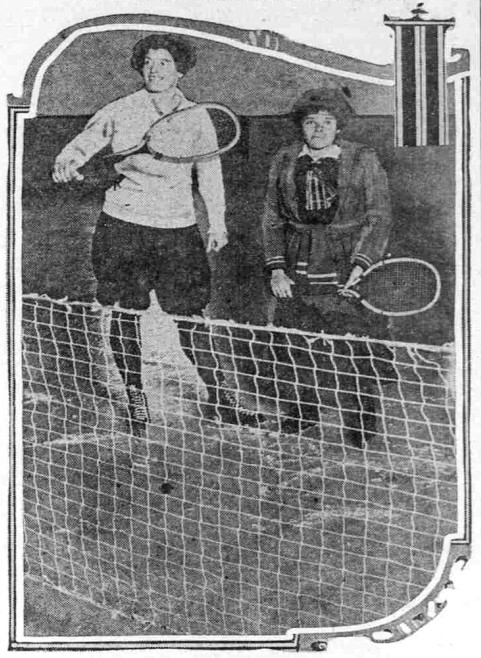
Meyer (left) with Irene Campbell (right) before their game of ice tennis on 8 January 1917, at the Portland Ice Arena.

In January 1917, Meyer played a match of ice tennis against Irene Campbell, which was the first of its kind in Oregon. The match was conceived by William F. Scott, manager of the Portland Ice Arena, who intended to make the sport a regular fixture of pre-game festivities at ice hockey games. Campbell defeated Meyer, 6–3.

The Multnomah Athletic Club was awarded the hosting duties of the AAU Women's National Diving Championships in 1917. During her training for the event, Meyer broke an ear drum. To prevent further injury Meyer packed her ear with cotton and sealed it with paraffin wax. No national diving competitors made the trek to Oregon so the AAU title meet—which took place on 19 May—was staged exclusively with state-wide participants, most of them who represented the host club. Meyer placed first in the event ahead of second-place finisher Helen Hicks and third-place finisher Thelma Payne.

Meyer followed-up her AAU title victory with a second-place finish during a diving meet at the 1917 Rose Festival in Portland. Meyer took first place at the 10 foot springboard event during the 1917 Pacific Coast Indoor Diving Championships on 27 July at Idora Park in Oakland, California. During the event, she introduced a new diving form called the "volplane". Following her Pacific Coast title victory, Meyer issued a challenge to national divers. On 3 September 1917, Meyer won a diving contest at the Astoria Regatta. That year, she began training for competitive high diving events from 16 and 24 foot platforms.

Meyer's first diving competition of 1918 was the Oregon State Diving Championship, which was held at the Multnomah Athletic Club on 12 January. She placed first with a score of 133.5. In March 1918, Meyer moved to Tacoma, Washington, but continued to compete under the auspices of the Multnomah Athletic Club. Two months later, a notice of separation was published in The Oregonian by Constance's husband, William N. Meyer. On 21 March 1919, he was granted a divorce on grounds of "desertion".

Meyer returned to competitive diving in May 1918 to train for the upcoming AAU Women's Diving Championship, which was scheduled for 20 July at the Multnomah Athletic Club. Thelma Payne won the AAU Championship, with Meyer coming in second. Meyer and Payne represented the Multnomah Athletic Club at the 1918 Pacific Coast Diving Championship in Victoria, British Columbia on 24 August. Payne again bested Meyer for the title.

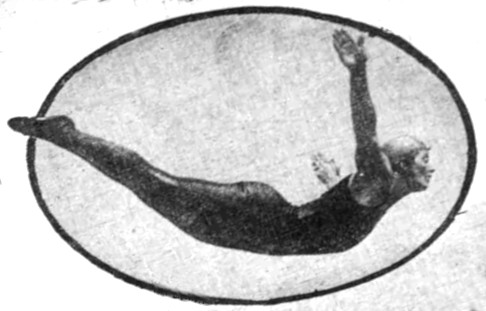
Meyer performing a swan dive, circa 1915

Meyer trained for the 1919 AAU title meet, but bowed out when the venue was switched from the Los Angeles Athletic Club to the Detroit Athletic Club. The only diver the Multnomah Athletic Club sent to 1919 AAU Diving Championship was Thelma Payne, who was the reigning title holder.

Meyer was struck on the heel by an automobile at the corner of Third avenue and Alder street in Portland on 23 March 1919. The driver, N. J. Braunstein, was arrested after Meyer went to the police. During the court case, Meyer attempted to show the judge her injury and in doing so removed her stocking. According to The Oregon Daily Journal, Judge Rossman was notably embarrassed and dismissed the charges on the agreement that Braunstein donate $10 to the American Red Cross.

On 3 May 1919, Meyer competed at the Pacific Northwest Indoor Diving Championship at the Multnomah Athletic Club. During the 1919 Rose Festival in Portland, Meyer performed a diving exhibition. Her next competitive diving meet came on 4 July 1919, during the Far West Diving Championship at Neptune Beach in Alameda, California. She placed second in the event behind Aileen Allen, who represented the Los Angeles Athletic Club. A later review of the scores by The Oregonian contended that one of the judge's score was tallied wrong, which cost Meyer first place. Meyer also competed in that year's Pacific Coast Outdoor Diving Championship in Victoria, British Columbia, but again came in second to teammate Thelma Payne. Meyer returned to Victoria, British Columbia on 22 September 1919, to perform for Edward VIII, Prince of Wales, during his tour of Canada, but the event was scrapped when the prince left for a hunting trip.

On 23 December 1919, Meyer married Lou C. Dressler in Vancouver, Washington. Meyer, who was eight years older than Dressler, declined to give her age on the marriage documents. Instead she listed her age as "legal". Lou C. Dressler was a labor organizer for the International Association of Bridge, Structural, Ornamental and Reinforcing Iron Workers.

In 1920, Meyer was hired to oversee swimming at the Columbia River beach in Portland. Meyer took first place in the diving qualifying event for the 1920 Summer Olympics, but was not invited to join the United States team. She competed in the 1920 Far West Diving Championship on 26 June at Neptune Beach in Alameda, California, where she placed third. Meyer continued to compete sporadically in diving events until at least 1922, including that year's Oregon State Outdoor Diving Championship at the Oaks Natatorium in Sellwood, Portland, Oregon. She placed first in the Oregon State Indoor Diving Championship at the Multnomah Athletic Club on 11 March 1922.

=== Legacy and later life ===
Meyer was credited by her teammate, Thelma Payne, in sparking her interest in diving when she witnessed Meyer perform at the Portland YWCA. Meyer was also the first pupil of Jack Cody to win a national title. Cody, who went on to train several Olympic swimmers and divers, is in the International Swimming Hall of Fame as a coach.

In 1922, DeWitt Harry for The Oregonian called Meyer the "grittiest and most daring amateur woman divers". She was critical of the excessive clothing women divers and swimmers were required to wear for modesty. She would wear a one-piece swimsuit when the event permitted its use instead of the traditional skirt swimsuit that were ubiquitous at the time. In 1918, Meyer told the publication Sweater News: The Journal of the Sweater and Fancy Knit Goods Trade, "Were it not for the handicap of too much clothing, more women would be heard from in this sport. [...] Public opinion has hampered the popularity of the skirtless bathing suit more than anything else. I think women would generally accept it were it not for criticism." Meyer designed her own swimsuit and it was manufactured by the Olympia Woolen Mills in Olympia, Washington.

In 1930, Meyer made it into the finals of a golf tournament at the Ingleside Golf Course in San Francisco, California. According to her husband, Meyer had only taken up golf five days prior. She won the San Mateo Women's Golf Club Tournament on 21 October 1952. At 72 years of age, she was still golfing.

Meyer and her husband moved to San Mateo County, California where they lived together until his death in 1946. She died at her San Mateo apartment on 3 January 1967, at the age of 84. Her death was described as "natural causes". She was interred at Cypress Lawn Memorial Park in Colma, California.

=== Record ===
Bowling

Name of contest	Date	Scores	Place	Location	Ref
1917 Northwest International Bowling Congress Women's Championship	24 April 1917	Game one: 170	Second	Oregon Alleys; Portland, Oregon	
1917 Northwest International Bowling Congress Women's Championship	24 April 1917	Game two: 158	Second	Oregon Alleys; Portland, Oregon	
1917 Northwest International Bowling Congress Women's Championship	24 April 1917	Game three: 147	Second	Oregon Alleys; Portland, Oregon	
1917 Northwest International Bowling Congress Women's Championship	24 April 1917	Total: 475	Second	Oregon Alleys; Portland, Oregon	

Swimming

Name of contest	Date	Event	Place	Location	Ref
1913 Multnomah Athletic Club Summer Swim Meet	13 June 1913	50 yard	First	Multnomah Athletic Club; Portland, Oregon	
1913 Multnomah Athletic Club Christmas Day Swim Meet	25 December 1913	50 yard	Second	Multnomah Athletic Club; Portland, Oregon	
1917 Astoria Regatta	2 September 1917	100 yard course	Third	Astoria Regatta; Astoria, Oregon	

Diving

Name of contest	Date	Place	Location	Ref
1913 Peninsula Park Swim Meet	23 August 1913	First	Peninsula Park Swimming Pool; Portland, Oregon	
1915 AAU Women's National Diving Championship	19 July 1915	First	Idora Park; Oakland, California	
1916 AAU Women's National Diving Championship	27 June 1916	Second	Los Angeles Athletic Club; Los Angeles, California	
1916 Astoria Regatta	4 September 1916	First	Astoria Regatta; Astoria, Oregon	
1917 AAU Women's National Diving Championship	19 May 1917	First	Multnomah Athletic Club; Portland, Oregon	
1917 Pacific Coast Indoor Diving Championship	26 August 1917	First	Idora Park; Oakland, California	
1917 Astoria Regatta Diving Meet	3 September 1917	First	Astoria Regatta; Astoria, Oregon	
1918 Oregon State Diving Championship	12 January 1918	First	Multnomah Athletic Club; Portland, Oregon	
1918 AAU Women's National Diving Championship	20 July 1918	Second	Multnomah Athletic Club; Portland, Oregon	
1918 Pacific Northwest Outdoor Diving Championship	25 August 1918	Second	Victoria, British Columbia	
1919 Pacific Northwest Indoor Diving Championship	3 May 1919	—	Multnomah Athletic Club; Portland, Oregon	
1919 Far Western Diving Championship	4 July 1919	Second^{§}	Neptune Beach; Alameda, California	
1919 Pacific Northwest Outdoor Diving Championship	20 July 1919	Second	Victoria, British Columbia	
1920 Far West Diving Championship	26 June 1920	Third	Neptune Beach; Alameda, California	
1920 Western Olympic Diving Tryouts	26 June 1920	First	Neptune Beach; Alameda, California	
1920 Olympic High Diving Qualifying Finals	10 July 1920	Eighth	Manhattan Beach, New York	
1920 Olympic Fancy Diving Qualifying Finals	10 July 1920	Sixth	Manhattan Beach, New York	
1922 Oregon State Indoor Diving Championship	11 March 1922	First	Multnomah Athletic Club; Portland, Oregon	
1922 Oregon State Outdoor Diving Championship	29 July 1922	Third	Oaks Natatorium; Portland, Oregon	

^{§}Miscalculations in one judge's score cost Meyer first place, according to The Oregonian.

Tennis

Name of contest	Date	Event	Place	Location	Ref
1916 Multnomah Athletic Club Spring Women's Tennis Tournament	13 June 1916	singles	Second	Multnomah Athletic Club; Portland, Oregon	
1917 Multnomah Athletic Club Women's Tennis Tournament	11 July 1917	doubles (with Mildred Wilson)	First	Multnomah Athletic Club; Portland, Oregon	

Preceded by Elise Hannerman; Aileen Allen	Amateur Athletic Union; Women's Diving Champion; 1915; 1917	Succeeded by Aileen Allen; Thelma Payne
