= Suzanne Zimmerman =

American swimmer (1925–2021)

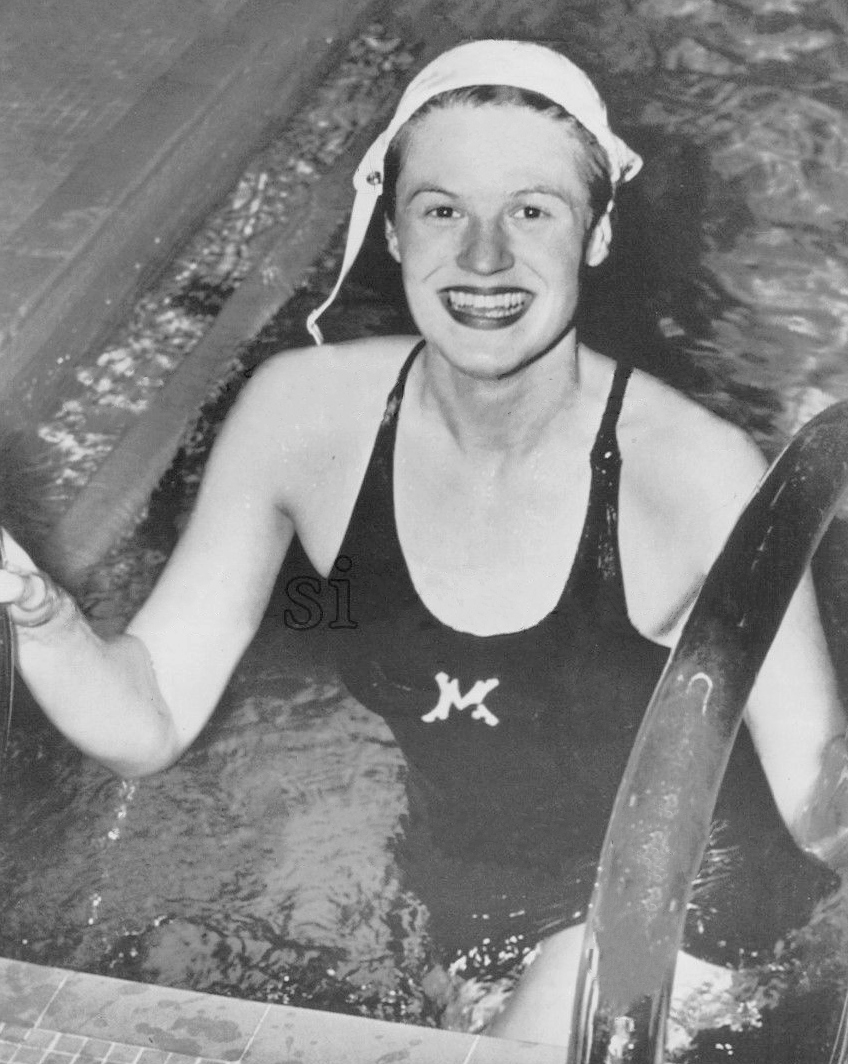
- Zimmerman in 1948

Personal information
- Full name: Suzanne Winona Zimmerman
- National team: United States
- Born: July 13, 1925 Portland, Oregon, U.S.
- Died: March 14, 2021 (aged 95) Portland, Oregon, U.S.
- Spouse: Gordon Edwards m. 1958
- Children: 2

Sport
- Sport: Swimming
- Strokes: Backstroke
- Club: Multnomah Athletic Club
- Coach: Jack Cody
Medal record
Representing the United States
Olympic Games
Silver medal – second place	1948 London	100 m backstroke

Suzanne Winona Zimmerman (July 13, 1925 – March 14, 2021), also known by her married name Suzanne Edwards, was an American competition swimmer for the Multnomah Athletic Club under Hall of Fame Coach Jack Cody, and a 1948 Olympic silver medalist in the 100 meter backstroke.

== Biography ==
=== Early life ===
Zimmerman was born on July 13, 1925 to Edith Chaffee Wardwell and Charles William Zimmerman, who settled in Lake Grove, Oregon by 1914, shortly after their marriage. She attended West Linn High School, and Portland's Willamette University.

Growing up in the small wooded town of Lake Grove, ten miles south of Portland, Suzanne enjoyed a vigorous early life including swimming daily in the summer in Oswego Lake By Junior High, she was trained and coached by the Multnomah Athletic Club's International Swimming Hall of Fame Coach Jack Cody. Though it was an exceptional program, according to Zimmerman, she began training with the club only three days a week, a practice schedule that would be considered inadequate for contemporary clubs.

=== Cody's Kids ===
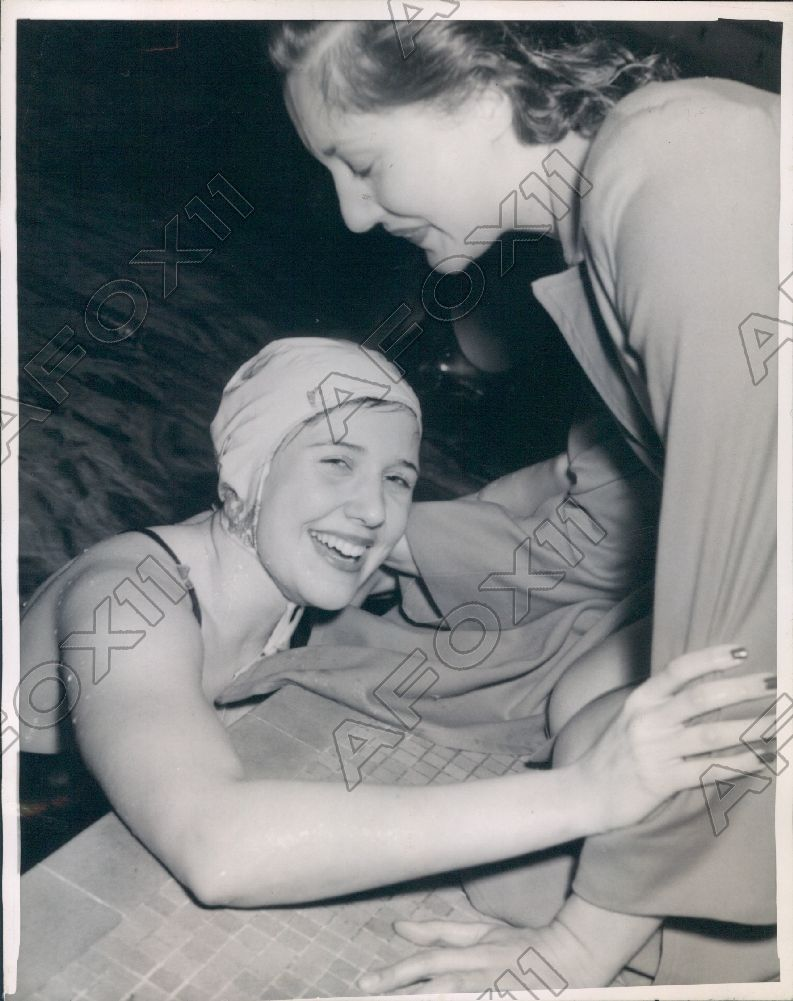
Helser (l) and Merki

With only a year or two of training at 14, but showing competitive skills, she was selected to receive a spot at the National championships in 1939 at Portland's Janzen Beach swimming pool. Along with fellow 1948 Olympians Brenda Helser and Nancy Merki, at the age of only 15, Zimmerman became part of the Multnomah Club's exceptional team dubbed "Cody's Kids" that from 1939 to 1948, won 42 individual, 16 relay and three team titles at the national level. Cody coached the Multnomah Club from 1913-1948, and though he focused initially on divers, he had many Olympic swimming participants and medalists as well. Zimmerman and her Multnomah team mates would become national celebrities, and Zimmerman would appear on the cover of Collier's Magazine a month before the 1948 Olympics.

In an early high point of her career on August, 1940, she swam anchor for the Multnomah Club's relay team that took second in the 880-yard freestyle relay at the National American Athletic Union's Outdoor swimming meet in Jantzen Beach Park. The team would have performed better but former champion Nancy Merki had been scratched. The team of Zimmerman, Merki, Helser, and Joyce Macrae set a new American national record of 4:45.7 in the 400-meter freestyle relay at the Far Western Swimming Championship in San Francisco on October 13, 1940.

=== Swimming achievements ===
In individual competition, she captured the AAU 100-meter freestyle title in 1942, and from 1942-1948 subsequently placed first in seven outdoor backstroke championships, a record bettered only by one other swimmer. In indoor competition, she won an indoor freestyle title and captured a total of six championships in backstroke. As a result of World War II, Zimmerman was unable to enjoy additional Olympic honors due to the cancellation of the 1944 Summer Olympics.

=== 1948 Olympics ===
At the 1948 Summer Olympics in post-war London, Zimmerman won a silver medal in the 100-meter backstroke with a time of 1:16.0. Though Denmark's Karen Harup was the favorite in the event, Holland's Cor Kint, who held the standing world record in the event from 1939-1950, would never swim in the Olympics due to her retirement and the cancellation of both the 1940 and 1944 Olympics. Denmark's Harup won the event with an Olympic record time of 1:14.4, a full 1.6 second margin over Zimmerman, but third place Judy-Joy Davies of Australia finished a close third for the bronze, .7 seconds behind Zimmerman.

== After swimming ==
On June 28, 1958, Zimmerman married Gordon L. Edwards, an urban planner, who was studying for a Masters in City Planning on scholarship at Harvard University. They took their vows at the Harvard campus in Cambridge, Massachusetts. The couple had their second child, a son, on August 9, 1960, which may have tied Suzanne to more of a home life during the family's travels through 1970. The couple travelled extensively, with residences in Boston, New York City, Manila, Dallas, and Vancouver, British Columbia before she returned to live most of the remainder of her life after 1974 in Portland.

=== Honors ===
Zimmerman was inducted into the Oregon Sports Hall of Fame in 1988, and was also a member of the Helm's Hall of Fame.

Zimmerman died at her home in Portland, on March 14, 2021, at the age of 95. She was interred at River View Cemetery. She was predeceased by her husband Gordon, and was survived by her two children and grandchildren.

== See also ==
- List of Olympic medalists in swimming (women)
