= Van Feggelen =

Van Feggelen is a Dutch toponymic surname meaning "from Feggelen".

Notable people with the surname include:

- Iet van Feggelen (1921–2012), Dutch backstroke swimmer
- Ruud van Feggelen (1924–2002), Dutch water polo competitor and coach
