= Thelma Payne =

American diver

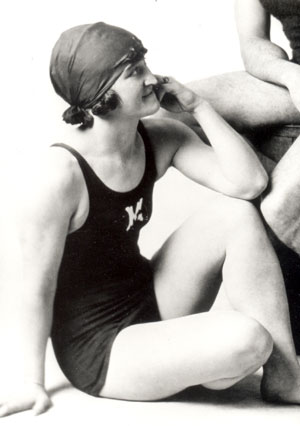

Personal information
- Born: July 18, 1896 Salem, Oregon, United States
- Died: September 7, 1988 (aged 92) Laguna Niguel, California, United States
- Occupations: Swim and Dive Coach
- Height: 1.66 m (5 ft 5 in)

Sport
- Sport: Diving
- Club: Multnomah AC, Portland
- Coached by: Jack Cody
Medal record
Representing the United States
Olympic Games
Bronze medal – third place	1920 Antwerp	3 m springboard

Thelma R. Payne (later Sanborn, July 18, 1896 – September 7, 1988) was an American diver who won the bronze medal in the 3 meter springboard at the 1920 Summer Olympics. She also won the springboard at the AAU Championships in 1918–1920. Payne was AAU national champion in diving in 1918, 1919 and 1920.

== Biography ==
Thelma Payne was born in Salem, Oregon on July 18, 1896. Her mother, Bertha Payne, was listed as a widow by the 1910 United States census. She lived in Portland, Oregon with her three daughters and was employed as a real estate stenographer. Bertha Payne was a member of a women's basketball club that played in Oregon and California. In 1908, the city council of Coos Bay, Oregon passed an ordinance that established a bounty on rat carcasses. The first person to claim a bounty from the town marshal was a young Thelma Payne. She was listed working as a switchboard operator in 1911 at the age of 15. In 1912, Payne was indicted on charges of theft. According to a complaint by Mrs. L Naylor, Payne—along with the three other people—absconded with her silverware. She initially entered a plea of not guilty, but eventually paid a $15 fine. A year later, Payne was listed in the Portland directory as a stenographer for attorney W. B. Gleason.

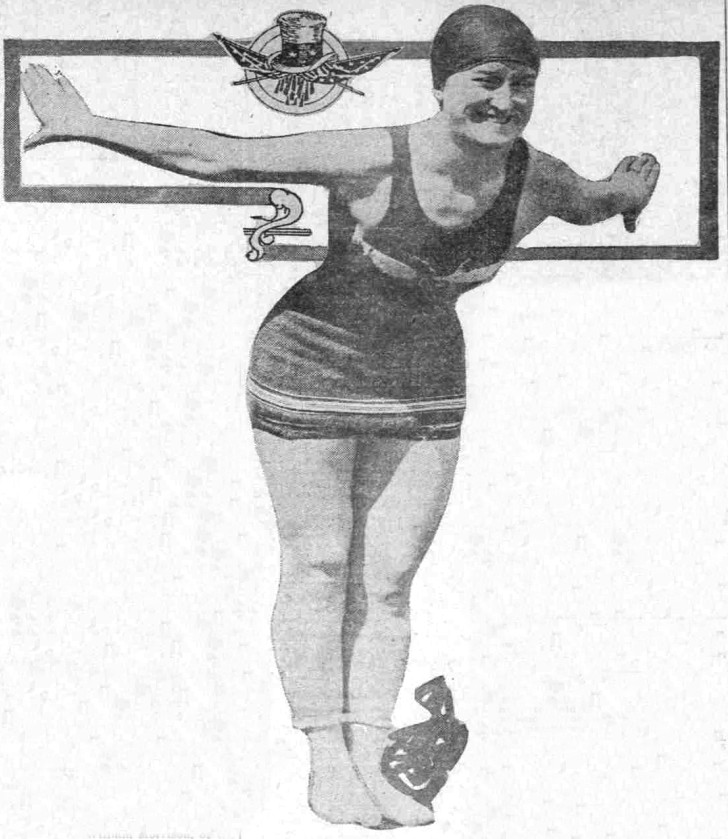
Payne displays her diving form for The Oregonian, circa 1917.

Payne first joined the swimming and diving team at the Multnomah Athletic Club in 1915. In 1916, The Oregonian wrote that Payne was "one of the Multnomah Athletic Club's best swimmers and divers". Around that time, Payne broke her nose and jaw while diving at the Multnomah Athletic Club. She lost half of her upper teeth and required 16 stitches under her chin. During an interview with the Amateur Athletic Foundation of Los Angeles in 1988, Payne said of the incident, "Well, it didn't hurt; I guess that nothing hurts me. I don't know what I'm made of. [...] But I didn't have my hands out. They didn't tell me to put my hands out, so I came down with my hands at my sides, lifted my head to come up, and hit the bottom of the swimming pool." After a short recuperation, Payne returned to the diving board.

During the 1917 Rose Festival in Portland, Payne competed in several aquatic events including surfing—which she won. The competition required the surfer to keep form on the board while being towed behind a boat, which is similar to modern wakeboarding. Upon her return from the 1920 Olympics, Payne told The Oregonian that the United States Olympic Committee (USOC) had done little to help her on her way to Antwerp. According to Payne, the USOC did not arrange her living quarters during Olympic qualifying matches in New York. She eventually met-up with a former member of the Multnomah Athletic Club who was living in New York and stayed in their home during the qualifying period. Payne also claimed that the five pre-arranged judges for the qualifying matches failed to appear, so the USOC used substitute judges. Payne accused the replacement judges of unfairly favoring the New York diver. When they got to Antwerp, she said the USOC mismanagement continued. She was quoted in The Oregonian as saying, "The Olympic games officials and their families were given first-class cabins and the best food. The second and third-class cabins were allotted to the girl members of the American team while the men athletes were quartered in the hold of the army transport, USS Princess Matoika".

Payne had to take a leave of absence from her work as the chief telephone switchboard operator for the City of Portland to compete in the 1920 Olympics. The city council passed a resolution that paid her for the two and a half months she missed for competition, which totaled to $250. According to a 1922 profile of Payne by The Oregonian, she was not a naturally skilled diver and required significant training to reach the Olympic level. She was introduced to swimming at the YWCA by instructor Millie Schloth and later witnessed a diving performance by Constance Meyer, which sparked her interest in the sport. She trained to dive at the Multnomah Athletic Club under instructor Jack Cody. Following the 1920 Olympics, Payne became the swimming and diving instructor at the Portland YWCA. Her work at the YWCA involved training girls under six for various aquatic sports including synchronized swimming and diving. In 1922, Payne was hired by the Windemuth Bath House on Ross Island to instruct their swimming and diving courses. Payne used Jantzen Swimwear and was mentioned by name in company advertisements following her Olympic bronze medal victory.

In 1926, Payne moved from Oregon to California, where she worked as a swimming instructor at the Breakers Beach Club in Santa Monica, the Jonathan Club, the Hollywood Athletic Club, and the Los Angeles Athletic Club. Payne trained swimmer Bowen Stassforth, who won a silver medal at the 1952 Summer Olympics, to overcome his fear of water. She also trained 1951 Pan American Games multi-gold medalist Sharon Geary, who went to the 1952 Summer Olympics as an alternate competitor for the United States. In 1983 she was inducted into the Oregon Sports Hall of Fame.
