= Muriel Mellon =

American swimmer

Personal information
- Full name: Muriel June Mellon
- National team: United States
- Born: June 14, 1928 San Diego, California, U.S.
- Died: August 23, 1966 (aged 38) Los Angeles, California, U.S.
- Education: University of Southern California (1954)
- Occupations: Educator, High School teacher High School Swim Coach; Physical Education teacher

Sport
- Sport: Swimming
- Strokes: Backstroke
- Club: Florence Chambers Swim Club; Los Angeles Athletic Club (LAAC)
- Coach: Flo. Chambers (Chambers S.C.); Aileen Allen (LAAC); Ray Daughters (Olympics)

Muriel June Mellon (June 14, 1928 – August 23, 1966) was an American competition swimmer who specialized in backstroke and trained and competed initially with the Florence Chambers Swim Club in San Diego and the Los Angeles Athletic Club. She represented the United States in the 100-meter backstroke at the 1948 Summer Olympics in London placing sixth in the finals. A graduate of the University of Southern California, she had a career as a boy's swim coach, and girl's physical education teacher, at Jefferson High School in Los Angeles, later serving as a vice-principal at Bell High School in Los Angeles.

Mellon was born June 14, 1928 in San Diego, California to mother Ethel Mellon and spouse. In San Diego she swam for the Florence Chambers Swim Club, and later with the Los Angeles Athletic Club during the 1940s where she was coached by Aileen Allen. At the 1942 Women's Indoor National 440-yard freestyle on April 26, Mellon finished third, and placed second in the 100-yard backstroke.

== Florence Chambers swim club ==
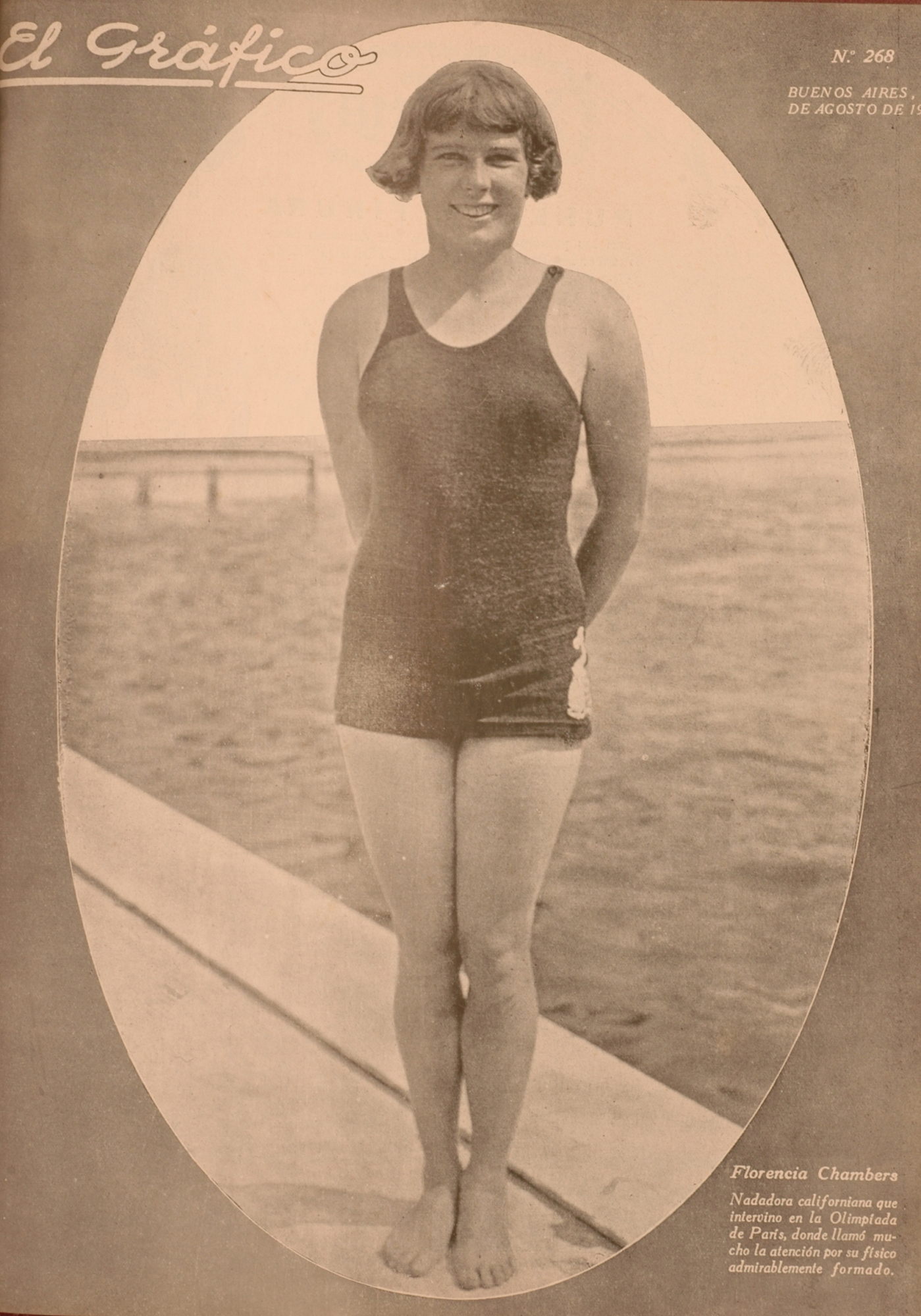
Florence Chambers, 1924

Distinguishing herself at the age of nine while representing the Florence Chambers Swim Club, Mellon won the 25-yard freestyle competition at the Pasadena Athletic Club in December, 1937 in a competition against the Pasadena Athletic Club, helping to lead her team to a 48-24 victory.

In October, 1938, representing the Florence Chambers Swim Club of San Diego, Mellon won honors for strong performances swimming the one-mile open water distance off Mission Beach in greater San Diego.

Once again representing the Florence Chambers Club, at the age of 11 Mellon set a regional record of 2:59.8 in the 220-yard freestyle, and took a first in a heat of the 100-yard backstroke, becoming high scorer, and leading her San Diego Club to a team championship at the Southern Pacific AAU Championships in July, 1939. As a skilled competitor in the stroke, Mellon's coach Florence Chambers had formerly competed in the 100-meter backstroke at the 1924 Paris Olympics.

At the La Jolla Roughwater swim in 1943, Muriel completed the open water swim of around 1 mile in La Jolla Cove, finishing ahead of competitor George Brody to become the first woman to finish before the Senior Men's Division competitor. According to a local source, she won the swim for the women's division in at least one year.

== Los Angeles Athletic Club ==
In 1946, Mellon won the 100-yard backstroke event at the National AAU championship with a time of 1:10.1. While swimming with the Los Angeles Athletic Club, she was part of the relay team at the National Championship that won the 300-meter medley relay for three straight years.

== 1948 Olympic trials ==
At the 1948 Olympic swim trials in Detroit, Michigan, Mellon qualified for the U.S. Olympic team in the 100-meter backstroke with a time very close to 1:19.7, finishing second Suzanne Zimmerman who took first with a time of 1:17.3, and Barbara Jenson who placed third. Mellon later noted that the boat that took the U.S. Olympic team to London had a pool that was only ten feet long, so training required the use of elastic cords attached to the waist to swim continuously.

== 1948 London Olympics ==
Mellon competed in the women's 100-meter backstroke, at the early August 1948 London Olympics in Wembley Stadium under head U.S. Olympic women's team coach Ray Daughters. She made the finals and among stiff competition finished seventh in the 100-meter event final with a time of 1:19.0, only around three seconds short of contending for a medal. Pre-game favorite, Karen Margreth Harup of Denmark placed first with a time of 1:14.4 winning the gold, rival American Suzanne Zimmerman placed second with a time of 1:16.0, and Judy-Joy Davies of Australia placed third taking the bronze with a time of 1:16.7.

In late May 1950, she swam an exhibition medley for the aquacade that drew 500 spectators to the Gaffey Street Pool in San Pedro. The aquacade was part of the annual Harbor Day Celebration that drew 35,000 attendees in San Pedro, California, a greater Los Angeles suburb. She swam in the aquacade again in 1951.

=== Education ===
Mellon attended San Diego State and was a graduate of the University of Southern California.

=== Career as coach and teacher ===
In 1950, Mellon worked as a lifeguard at Harvard Pool on Denker Avenue in Los Angeles where she assisted in a few swimming classes conducted as part of a Learn to Swim Program, sponsored by the City Recreation Department. In September of 1951, she worked as a swim instructor at the Westport Beach Club in greater Los Angeles, and directed a Labor Day swimming exhibition.

After ending her elite swimming career around 1949-50, Mellon had a steady career in education as a teacher of physical education, and was a teacher, and swim coach at Los Angeles's Jefferson High School for twelve years beginning in 1950. She taught the occasional course in modern dance. She began coaching the boys swimming team at Jefferson High School, beginning in 1952, after completing her degree from University of Southern California, becoming the first woman in Los Angeles to coach a boy's High School team. In a late career, prior to her death she was a vice-principal at Bell High School in greater Los Angeles roughly from around 1963-1966.

On August 23, 1966, Mellon died at only 38 at Huntington Memorial Hospital in Pasadena, California from a somewhat long, lingering illness. Services were held on the morning of August 26 at the Pasadena Memorial Church, and she was buried at El Camino Memorial Park in Sorrento Valley outside her native San Diego.
