= Weightlifting at the 1948 Summer Olympics – Men's 56 kg =

Men's 56 kg at the Games of the XIV Olympiad
- Venue: Empress Hall (Earls Court Exhibition Centre)
- Date: 9 August 1948
- Competitors: 19 from 14 nations
- Winning total: 307.5 kg WR

Medalists
1st place, gold medalist(s)		Joseph De Pietro	United States
2nd place, silver medalist(s)		Julian Creus	Great Britain
3rd place, bronze medalist(s)		Richard Tom	United States

The men's 56 kg weightlifting competitions at the 1948 Summer Olympics in London took place on 9 August at the Empress Hall of the Earls Court Exhibition Centre. It was the first appearance of the bantamweight class, which was split off the featherweight (60 kg) class that had previously been the lightest. This was the first change in weight classes since their introduction in the 1920 Summer Olympics.

Each weightlifter had three attempts at each of the three lifts. The best score for each lift was summed to give a total. The weightlifter could increase the weight between attempts (minimum of 5 kg between first and second attempts, 2.5 kg between second and third attempts) but could not decrease weight. If two or more weightlifters finished with the same total, the competitors' body weights were used as the tie-breaker (lighter athlete wins).

== Records ==
Prior to this competition, the existing world and Olympic records were as follows.

World record	Press	Joseph De Pietro (USA)	106.5 kg		1948
World record	Snatch	Julian Creus (GBR)	91 kg		1948
World record	Clean & Jerk	Mahmoud Namdjou (IRI)	122.5 kg		1948
World record	Total	Joseph De Pietro (USA)	300 kg	Philadelphia, United States	1947
Olympic record	Press	New event	–	–	–
Olympic record	Snatch	New event	–	–	–
Olympic record	Clean & Jerk	New event	–	–	–
Olympic record	Total	New event	–	–	–

== Results ==
Rank	Athlete	Nation	Body weight	Press (kg)				Snatch (kg)				Clean & Jerk (kg)				Total
Rank	Athlete	Nation	Body weight	1	2	3	Result	1	2	3	Result	1	2	3	Result	Total
1st place, gold medalist(s)	Joseph De Pietro	United States	55.90	100	105	~~107.5~~	105 OR	85	~~90~~	90	90	105	110	112.5	112.5	307.5 WR
2nd place, silver medalist(s)	Julian Creus	Great Britain	55.85	77.5	82.5	~~85~~	82.5	90	95	~~97.5~~	95 OR	115	120	~~122.5~~	120	297.5
3rd place, bronze medalist(s)	Richard Tom	United States	55.25	82.5	~~87.5~~	87.5	87.5	85	90	~~92.5~~	90	112.5	~~117.5~~	117.5	117.5	295
4	Lee Gyu-hyeok	South Korea	55.78	~~77.5~~	77.5	~~82.5~~	77.5	87.5	92.5	~~95~~	92.5	115	120	~~125~~	120	290
5	Mahmoud Namdjou	Iran	55.75	~~82.5~~	82.5	~~85~~	82.5	82.5	~~87.5~~	~~87.5~~	82.5	112.5	117.5	122.5	122.5 OR	287.5
6	Marcel Thévenet	France	55.92	85	90	~~92.5~~	90	75	80	~~82.5~~	80	100	105	110	110	280
7	Rosaire Smith	Canada	55.87	77.5	82.5	~~85~~	82.5	80	85	~~87.5~~	85	110	~~115~~	~~115~~	110	277.5
8	Maurice Crow	New Zealand	55.10	77.5	~~82.5~~	~~82.5~~	77.5	77.5	82.5	85	85	102.5	107.5	110	110	272.5
9	Keith Caple	Australia	55.16	~~77.5~~	~~77.5~~	77.5	77.5	77.5	82.5	85	85	100	110	~~112.5~~	110	272.5
10	Pak Dong-uk	South Korea	55.80	~~80~~	80	~~85~~	80	~~80~~	80	85	85	~~107.5~~	107.5	~~112.5~~	107.5	272.5
11	Abdel Hamid Yacout	Egypt	55.95	75	~~80~~	~~80~~	75	80	85	~~87.5~~	85	105	110	112.5	112.5	272.5
12	Ernő Porubszky	Hungary	56.00	67.5	72.5	~~75~~	72.5	80	85	87.5	87.5	102.5	107.5	110	110	270
13	Abe Greenhalgh	Great Britain	55.90	85	90	92.5	92.5	~~75~~	75	~~77.5~~	75	95	100	~~105~~	100	267.5
14	Einar Sundström	Finland	56.00	70	75	77.5	77.5	80	85	~~87.5~~	85	105	~~110~~	~~110~~	105	267.5
15	Maung Win Maung	Burma	55.91	77.5	82.5	–	82.5	77.5	82.5	~~85~~	82.5	100	~~105~~	~~105~~	100	265
16	Eugène Wattier	France	55.97	75	80	~~82.5~~	80	75	~~80~~	80	80	100	~~105~~	~~105~~	100	260
17	Josef Vojtech	Austria	55.64	~~75~~	80	~~82.5~~	80	~~75~~	75	~~80~~	75	100	~~105~~	~~105~~	100	255
18	Pentti Kotvio	Finland	55.85	65	~~70~~	~~70~~	65	75	~~80~~	80	80	95	102.5	~~105~~	102.5	247.5
19	Marcelino Salas	Mexico	55.38	60	~~65~~	~~65~~	60	70	~~75~~	~~75~~	70	95	100	~~102.5~~	100	230

== New records ==
Press	105 kg	Joseph De Pietro (USA)	OR
Snatch	95 kg	Julian Creus (GBR)	OR
Clean & Jerk	122.5 kg	Mahmoud Namdjou (IRI)	OR
Total	307.5 kg	Joseph De Pietro (USA)	OR, WR
