= Jack Cody =

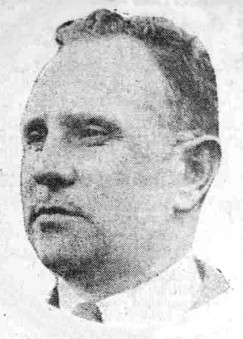
- Cody circa 1922

Biographical details
- Born: April 1, 1885
- Died: April 11, 1963 (aged 78); Santa Monica, California, US

Coaching career (HC unless noted)
- 1913-1949: Multnomah Athletic Club
- 1956: U.S. Women's Team Coach; 1956 Summer Olympics

Accomplishments and honors

Championships
- 3 National AAU Women's Titles '43, '44, '49; 42 Individual Championships '39-'49; 1956 Olympics Coach, Women

Awards
- Int. Swim. Hall of Fame '70; ASCA Hall of Fame '02.

Jack Cody (April 1, 1885 – April 11, 1963) was an American swimming coach in Oregon. He coached at the Multnomah Athletic Club in Portland, Oregon for more than 30 years, winning 3 national championships and producing 15 Olympic swimmers.

== Early career ==
A diver who developed his diving technique at the Multnomah Athletic Club in Portland, Oregon, by 1913 Cody began to coach divers and swimmers at the Club and brought national prominence to diver Constance Meyer. He was the first coach of Norman Ross, a swimming world record setter and multiple gold medal winner at the 1920 Summer Olympics, who later became a sportscaster. In those same Olympics, his diving students Thelma Payne, Hap Kuehn, and Louis Balbach all medaled in diving. Cody was one of the earlier proponents of the use of weight training for his divers.

== "Cody's Kids" ==
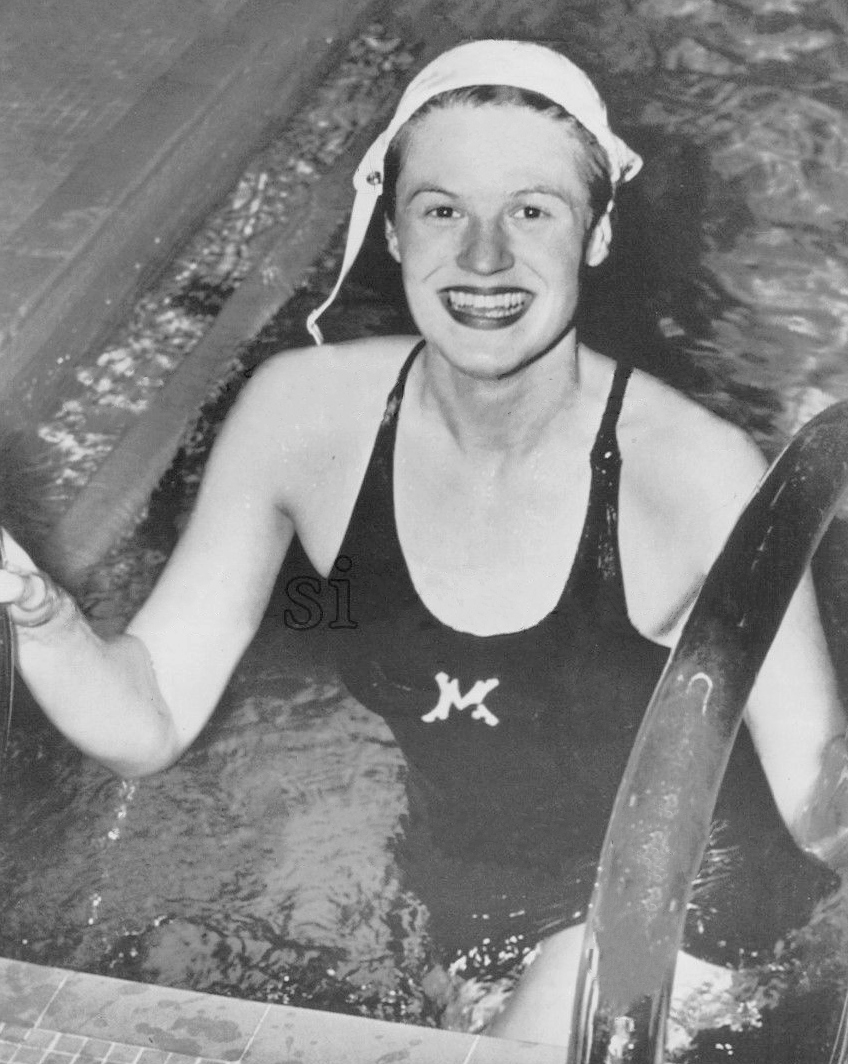
Zimmerman '48

His greatest fame came from 1939 to 1949 with the emergence of a group of his students who came to be known as "Cody's Kids": Nancy Merki, Brenda Helser, Suzanne Zimmerman, Joyce Macrae, Geneva Klaus, and Mary Anne Hansen, who dominated U.S. girls amateur swimming, winning three national Amateur Athletic Union swimming titles (in 1943, 1944, and 1949), 42 individual championships, and 16 relay championships, setting numerous records along the way.

Though greater recognition came in later years, many swimming analysts have noted the core of Cody's greatest national team consisting of Helser, Zimmerman, and Merki, were already swimming for Cody by 1938 but were quite young. Brenda Helser, only turning 14 in 1938, would soon emerge as an American freestyle champion, and Suzanne Zimmerman, barely 13, would be recognized as a national backstroke champion.

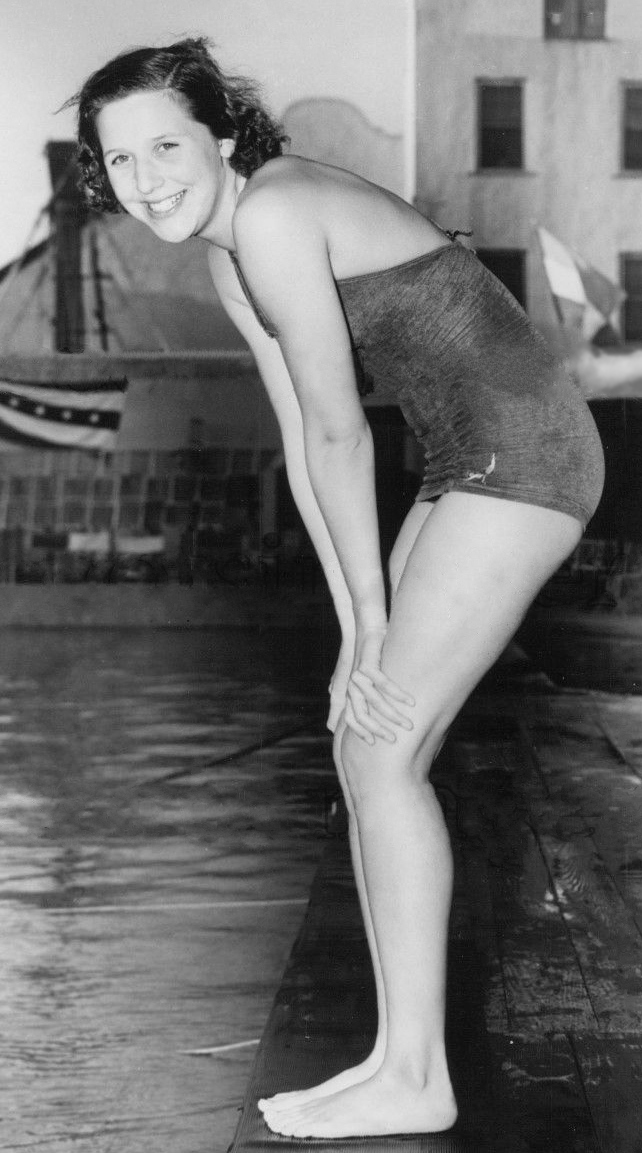
N. Merki

Nancy Merki, though only turning 12 in 1938, would become a middle distance freestyle swimmer. She set 19 individual records in her swimming career and went 17 seconds under the prior 1,500-meter freestyle record at the 1941 AAU championships. Later, at 22 she would qualify for the 1948 Olympics in the 400 meter freestyle. She won swimming competitions at every distance and in every stroke. Mary Anne Hanson who swam for Cody a bit after 1938 would help win four senior national indoor titles in Chicago in 1943.

=== Two 1948 Olympic medalists ===
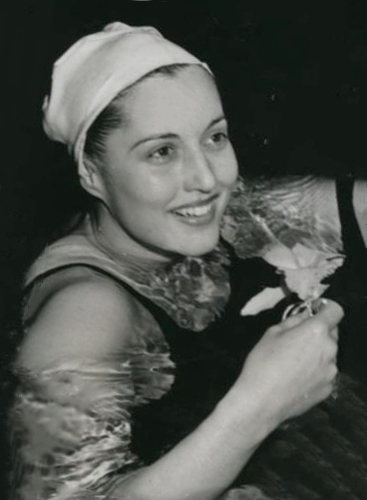
Helser '48

The cancellation of the 1940 and 1944 Summer Olympics due to World War II prevented several of Cody's swimmers from having a chance to appear in the Olympics at the peak of their careers, though Zimmerman and Helser did win medals in the 1948 games which Cody did not coach. Zimmerman won a Silver medal in the 100-meter backstroke with a time of 1:16.0, and Helser took a Gold medal, swimming the third leg in America's winning 4x100 Meter freestyle relay team in an Olympic Record time of 4:20.2. Nancy Merki, then known as Nancy Lees reached the finals of the 400 women's 400-meter freestyle, but finished in eighth place. Brenda Helser did a bit better, finishing fifth with a time of 5:26.0.

=== 1956 Olympic coach ===
Cody was the head coach for the American Women's Olympic team at the 1956 Olympics in Melbourne, Australia. At the Melbourne Olympics, American swimmers finished second to Australia in the medal count with a combined 11 medals. The women's team accounted for six of the U.S. team's 11 metals, winning all three medals in the butterfly competition. Though he served as head coach of only one Olympics, around fifteen of his swimmers from Portland's Multnomah Club competed in Olympic competition.

== Legacy ==
Cody retired from the MAC in 1949 and moved to Los Angeles, where he continued teaching and coaching. He is a member of the International Swimming Hall of Fame, the Oregon Sports Hall of Fame, and the American Swimming Coaches Association Hall of Fame in 2002.

At 78, he died at Saltair Convalescent Hospital in Santa Monica, California on April 10, 1963. He had been living on Veteran Avenue in Los Angeles, and had been stricken in his home a few days earlier.

== See also ==
- List of members of the International Swimming Hall of Fame
