= Nancy Merki =

American swimmer (1926–2014)

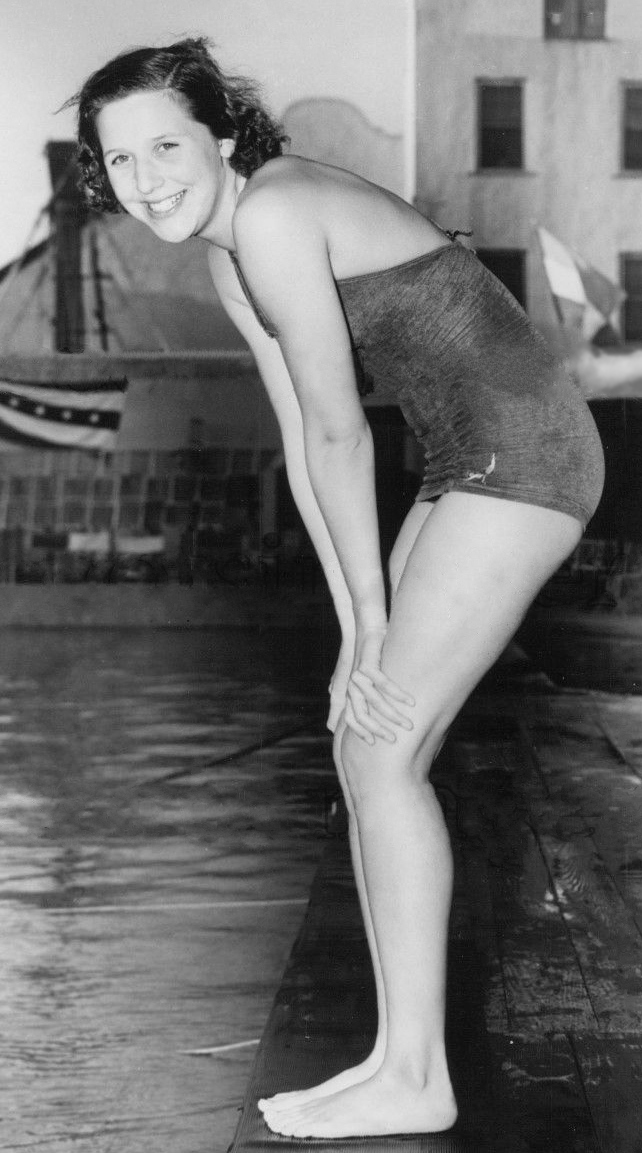

Personal information
- Full name: Nancy Merki
- National team: United States
- Born: June 1, 1926 Portland, Oregon, U.S.
- Died: October 7, 2014 (aged 88) Hendersonville, North Carolina, U.S.

Sport
- Sport: Swimming
- Strokes: Freestyle
- Club: Multnomah Athletic Club
- Coach: Jack Cody

Nancy Merki (June 1, 1926 – October 7, 2014), also known by her married names Lees, Cory and Boland, was an American competition swimmer who represented the United States at the 1948 Summer Olympics in London. Despite contracting polio at a young age, she set numerous amateur swimming records in her career, most in her early teens, and went on to compete in the 400-meter freestyle in the Olympics.

== Early life and career ==
Merki grew up in Portland, Oregon. At a young age, she contracted poliomyelitis. With discovery of the polio vaccine years away, she took up swimming as exercise to reduce the effects of the disease at the age of 8. Trained by long-time swim coach Jack Cody, Merki excelled at the sport, and at the age of 13 entered the swimming scene at the Amateur Athletic Union (AAU) national championships in 1939, setting American records in the 200, 400, and 800-freestyle events. Merki, who along with Multnomah Athletic Club teammates Brenda Helser, Suzanne Zimmerman, Geneva Klaus, Joyce Macrae, and Mary Anne Hansen, were known as "Cody's Kids" after their coach Jack Cody, and figured to be a force at the 1940 Summer Olympics until the games were canceled by the events of World War II.

Merki continued to compete in AAU meets through the 1940s, setting numerous records, including shattering the 1,500-meter freestyle record by 17 seconds at the 1941 AAU championships. Merki and her MAC teammates won three national championships from 1939 to 1949, and Merki herself set 19 individual records. In 1941, at the age of 15, she finished sixth in balloting for the James E. Sullivan Award, presented to the nation's top amateur athlete.

== Olympics ==
Although the war prevented her from competing in the Olympics at the peak of her career, she made the United States team for the 1948 Summer Olympics. Then known as Nancy Lees (she married Whitlock Lees Jr. prior to the games), she reached the finals of the women's 400-meter freestyle, though she finished in eighth place.

== Personal life ==
Lees settled in the Asheville, North Carolina area where she remarried twice after her husband died. She was diagnosed with Alzheimer's disease in 2008 and died from complications of the disease in 2014.

In 1955, Merki's early life and struggle to defeat polio with the help of coach Cody was dramatized in an episode of the television anthology series Cavalcade of America entitled "A Time for Courage." The show starred Gloria Talbott as Merki and Hugh Beaumont as Jack Cody.

In 1980, she was an inaugural member of the Oregon Sports Hall of Fame.
