= Bodybuilding in France =

- Country: France
- National team(s): France

Bodybuilding in France dates to 1847 (178 years ago). The country has a national federation that is a member of the European Bodybuilding and Fitness Federation and the International Federation of Bodybuilding and Fitness.

== History ==
The tradition of muscle building in France in 1847 with the opening of Gymnase Triat. Monique Berlioux was an early supporter of the IFBB in France.

== Governance ==
France has an organization that is a member of the European Bodybuilding and Fitness Federation. The country has a national organization that is a recognized by the International Federation of Bodybuilding and Fitness as a national federation, representing the country's bodybuilding community.
