= Kolbrún Ólafsdóttir =

Icelandic swimmer (1933–1960)

Personal information
- Born: 1 February 1933 Reykjavík, Iceland
- Died: 22 April 1960 (aged 27) Reykjavík, Iceland

Sport
- Sport: Swimming

Kolbrún Ólafsdóttir (1 February 1933 – 22 April 1960) was an Icelandic swimmer. She competed in the women's 100 metre backstroke at the 1948 Summer Olympics. A women's pioneer swimmer in Iceland, she won several national championships and once held all women's national records in backstroke and front crawl.

Kolbrún was born in Reykjavík and started swimtraining with Ármann at the age of 12. She died in 1960 at the age of 27 after battling an unspecific illness.
