= Vera Ellery =

British swimmer

Personal information
- Born: 10 August 1926 Croydon, England
- Died: 31 October 1998 (aged 72)

Sport
- Sport: Swimming

Vera Ellery (10 August 1926 – 31 October 1998) was a British swimmer. She competed in the women's 100 metre backstroke at the 1948 Summer Olympics.
