= Einar Sundström =

Finnish weightlifter

Personal information
- Nationality: Finnish
- Born: 11 September 1919 Helsinki, Finland
- Died: 13 May 2003 (aged 83) Helsinki, Finland

Sport
- Sport: Weightlifting

Einar Sundström (11 September 1919 – 13 May 2003) was a Finnish weightlifter. He competed in the men's bantamweight event at the 1948 Summer Olympics.
