= Maurice Crow =

New Zealand sportsperson (1925–2011)

Personal information
- Born: 20 May 1925 Waitara, New Zealand
- Died: 17 November 2011 (aged 86)
- Weight: 55 kg (121 lb)

Sport
- Country: New Zealand
- Sport: Weightlifting

Maurice "Pom" Crow (20 May 1925 – 17 November 2011) was a New Zealand weightlifter and rower. As a coxswain for the Clifton Rowing Club, he won three national titles in the 1930s. During his weightlifting career, he became the first New Zealand weightlifter to compete at the Summer Olympics. He competed in the men's bantamweight event and placed eighth overall.

== Biography ==
Maurice "Pom" Crow was born on 20 May 1925 Waitara, Taranaki, New Zealand. Domestically, he represented the Clifton Rowing Club based in Waitara as a coxswain and won three New Zealand national titles in the 1930s.

As a weightlifter, he was reported to have lifted 212 pounds (96 kg) in the clean and jerk, 6 pounds (2.7 kg) off the world record at the time. According to the New Zealand Olympic Committee, he was defined by his technique. He was selected to compete for New Zealand at the 1948 Summer Olympics held in London, England, as the first weightlifter to represent the nation. According to the Taranaki Daily News, he had to pay $NZ750 as part of his contributions to the team.There, he competed in the men's bantamweight event for competitors that weighed 56 kilograms or less. He pressed 77.5 kilograms, snatched 85 kilograms, and clean and jerked 110 kilograms for a total of 272.5 kilograms. Overall, he placed eighth out of the 19 weightlifters that competed in the event.

After the 1948 Summer Games, he was involved with the rowing club up until the 1960s. He resided in the Whangaparāoa Peninsula. Crow later died on 17 November 2011 at the age of 86. A regatta a few days after his death that was held by the rowing club honored Crow.
