= Frits Smol =

Dutch water polo player (1924–2006)

Personal information
- Born: 6 July 1924 The Hague, the Netherlands
- Died: 1 November 2006 (aged 82) The Hague, the Netherlands

Sport
- Sport: Water polo
- Club: HZ ZIAN, The Hague
Medal record
Representing the Netherlands
Olympic Games
Bronze medal – third place	1948 London	Team
European Championships
Gold medal – first place	1950 Vienna	Team

Frits Smol (6 July 1924 – 1 November 2006) was a Dutch water polo player who won a European title in 1950. He competed in the 1948 and 1952 Summer Olympics and won a bronze medal in 1948, placing fifth in 1952. He was the second best Dutch player at those games after Ruud van Feggelen, scoring ten goals in 1948 and eight goals in 1952.

== See also ==
- List of Olympic medalists in water polo (men)
