= Helser =

Helser is a surname. Notable people with the surname include:

- Brenda Helser (1924–2001), American competition swimmer
- Jonathan David & Melissa Helser, American Christian music husband and wife duo
