= Beryl Marshall =

Argentine swimmer

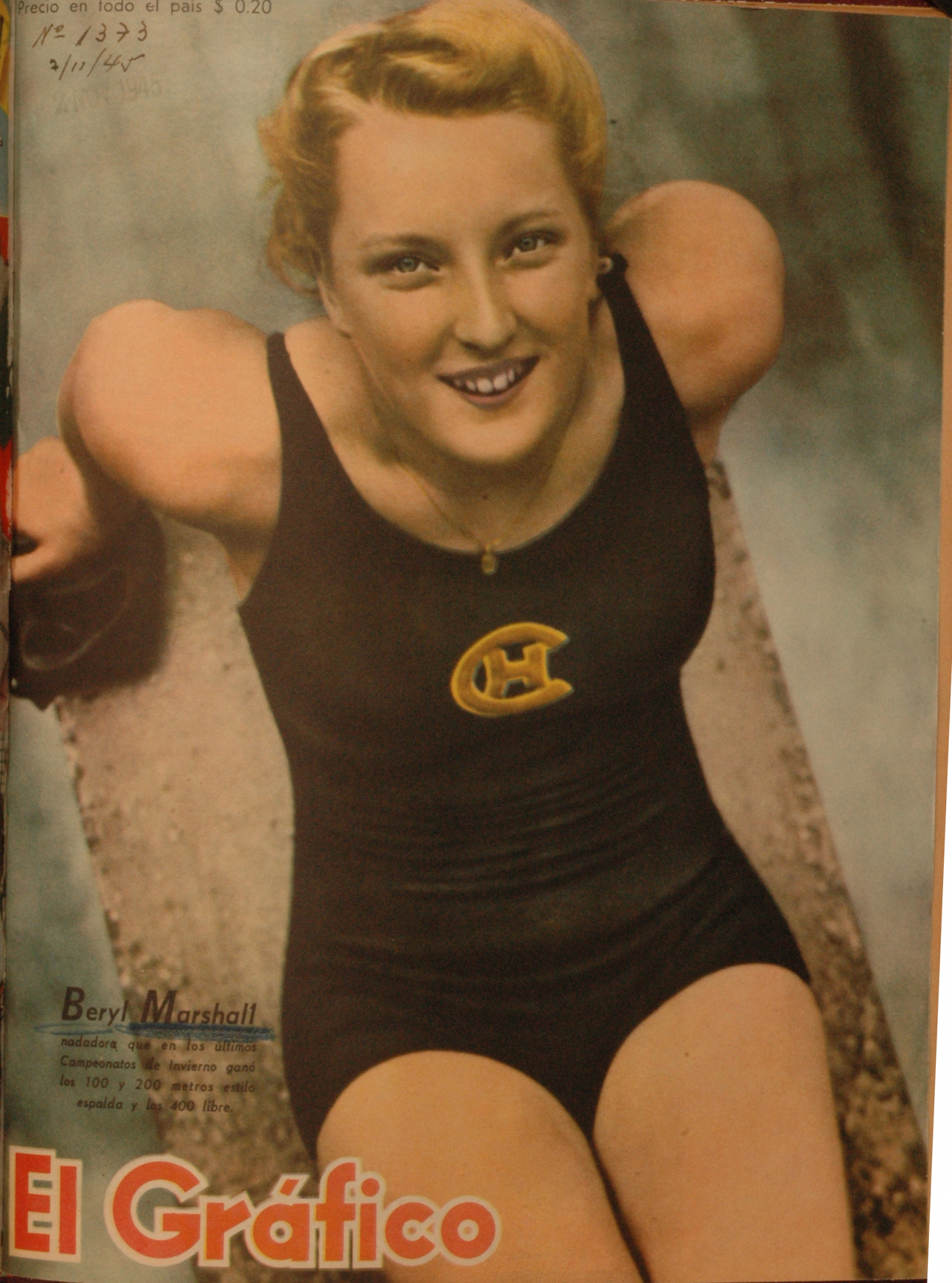
- Marshall in November 1945

Personal information
- Nationality: Argentine
- Born: 26 November 1929
- Died: 21 January 2015 (aged 85)

Sport
- Sport: Swimming
- Strokes: Backstroke
- Club: Hindú Club, Buenos Aires

Beryl Marshall (26 November 1929 – 21 January 2015) was an Argentine swimmer who competed at the 1948 Summer Olympics. She competed in the women's 100 metre backstroke event and she reached the semi-final where she did not qualify to compete in the final.
