= Lee Gyu-hyeok =

South Korean weightlifter

Personal information
- Nationality: South Korean

Sport
- Sport: Weightlifting

Lee Gyu-hyeok was a South Korean weightlifter. He competed in the men's bantamweight event at the 1948 Summer Olympics.
