= Luke and the Mermaids =

1916 film

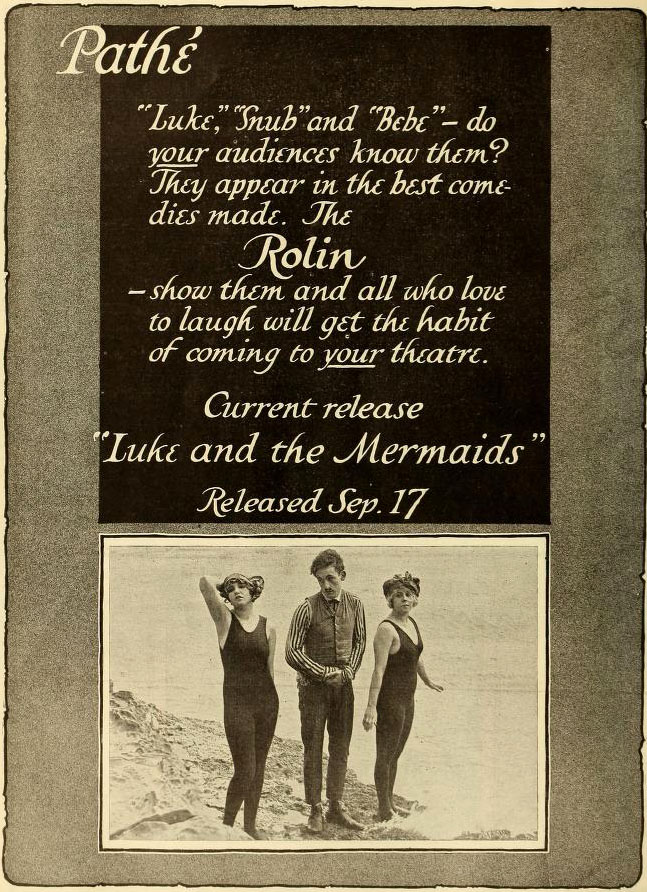
- Ad for film
- Directed by: Hal Roach
- Produced by: Hal Roach
- Starring: Harold Lloyd
- Cinematography: James A. Crosby
- Distributed by: Pathé Exchange
- Release date: September 18, 1916
- Country: United States
- Language: Silent with English intertitles

Luke and the Mermaids is a 1916 American short comedy film featuring Harold Lloyd.

== Cast ==
- Harold Lloyd – Lonesome Luke
- Snub Pollard
- Bebe Daniels
- Charles Stevenson – (as Charles E. Stevenson)
- Billy Fay
- Fred C. Newmeyer
- Sammy Brooks
- Harry Todd
- Bud Jamison
- Margaret Joslin (as Mrs. Harry Todd)
- Dee Lampton
- May Cloy
- John Weiss
- Tod Cregier
- Mary Henderson
- Florence Rose
- Ruth Marzer
- Aileen Allen
- Vera Steadman

== See also ==
- Harold Lloyd filmography
