= Cor Kint =

Dutch swimmer (1920–2002)

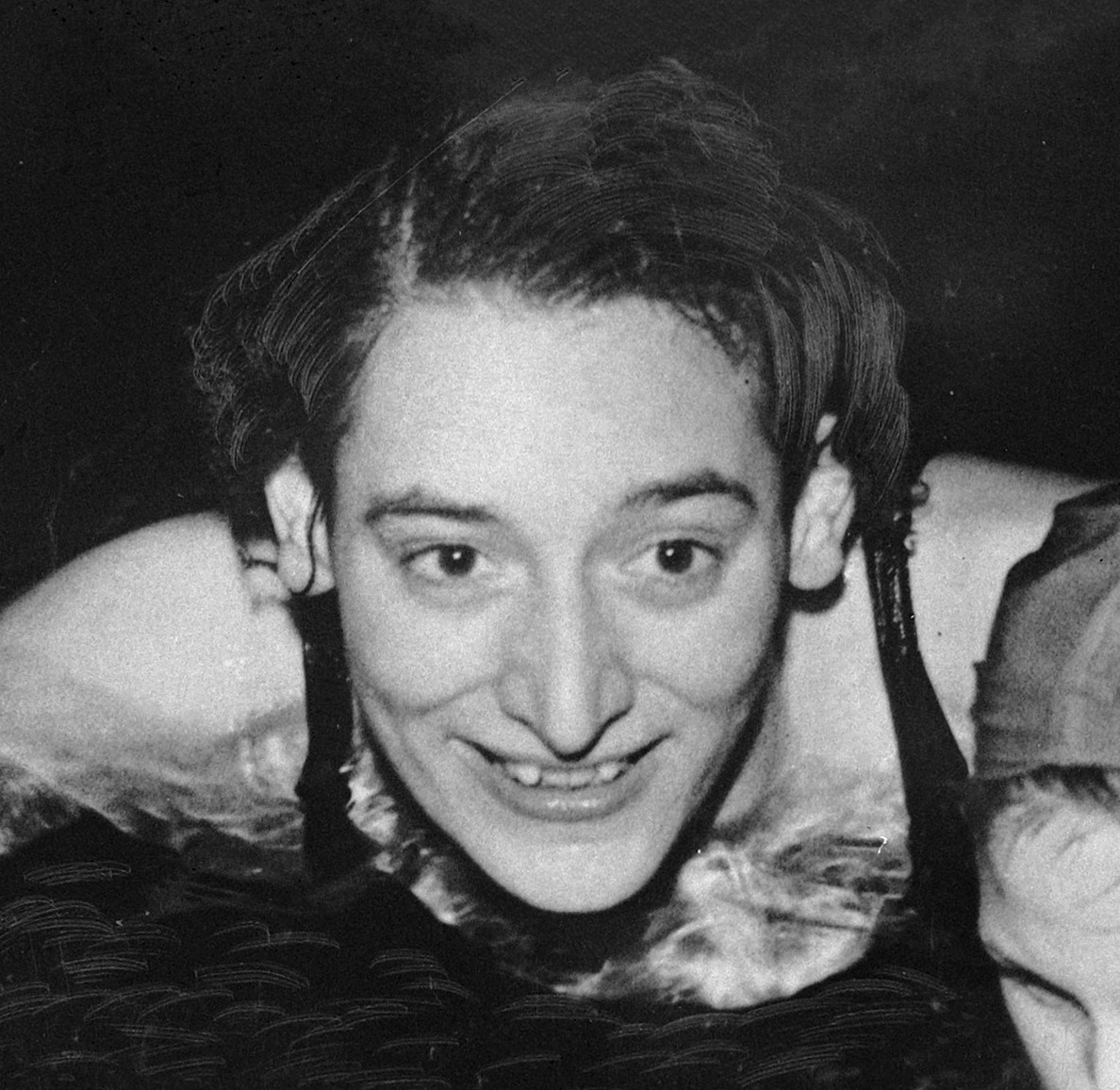
- Kint in 1938

Personal information
- Full name: Clasina Cornelia Kint
- Born: 22 July 1920 Rotterdam, Netherlands
- Died: 7 October 2002 (aged 82) Coffs Harbour, Australia

Sport
- Sport: Swimming
Medal record
Women's swimming
Representing the Netherlands
European Championships
Gold medal – first place	1938 London	100 m backstroke

Clasina Cornelia "Cor" Kint (22 July 1920, Rotterdam – 7 October 2002, Coffs Harbour, Australia) was a Dutch backstroke swimmer who won the gold medal at the 1938 European Aquatics Championships. Between 1938 and 1940 she was three times national champion in the 100 m backstroke and set five world records and four European records in the 100 m, 200 m, 100 yd and 150 yd backstroke events. Her 150 yd and 200 m records stood for 11 year and her 100 m world record was not broken for a period of 21 years - the longest a record has ever stood in swimming. In 1971, she was inducted into the International Swimming Hall of Fame.

== Notes and references ==
Records
Preceded by (Netherlands) Nida Senff (Netherlands) Iet van Feggelen	Women's 100 metre backstroke world record holder (long course); 1 November 1938 – 10 November 1938; 22 September 1939 – 5 December 1956	Succeeded by (Netherlands) Iet van Feggelen (United Kingdom) Judy Grinham
Preceded by (Denmark) Ragnhild Hveger (Netherlands) Iet van Feggelen	Women's 200 metre backstroke world record holder (long course); 17 April 1938 – 26 October 1938; 26 November 1939 – 2 April 1950	Succeeded by (Netherlands) Iet van Feggelen (Netherlands) Geertje Wielema
