= New Zealand at the 1948 Summer Olympics =

- IOC code: NZL
- NOC: New Zealand Olympic and British Empire Games Association
- Website: www.olympic.org.nz

in London
- Competitors: 7 (6 men, 1 woman) in 5 sports
- Flag bearer: Harold Nelson (athlete)
- Officials: 2
- Medals: Gold 0 Silver 0 Bronze 0 Total 0

Summer Olympics appearances (overview)
- 1908; 1912; 1920; 1924; 1928; 1932; 1936; 1948; 1952; 1956; 1960; 1964; 1968; 1972; 1976; 1980; 1984; 1988; 1992; 1996; 2000; 2004; 2008; 2012; 2016; 2020; 2024

Other related appearances
- Australasia (1908–1912)

New Zealand competed at the 1948 Summer Olympics in London, England. It was their eighth appearance at the Olympics after their debut in 1908. Seven competitors, six men and one woman, took part in eight events in five sports. New Zealand was one of 22 nations that did not win any medals.

== Competitors ==
The following table lists the number of New Zealand competitors who participated at the 1948 Summer Olympics according to gender and sport. The last surviving member of the 1948 Olympic team, swimmer Ngaire Lane, died on 9 July 2021.

Sport	Men	Women	Total
Athletics	3	0	3
Boxing	1	—N/a	1
Cycling	1	—N/a	1
Swimming	0	1	1
Weightlifting	1	—N/a	1
Total	6	1	7

== Athletics ==
Athlete	Event	Heat		Semifinal		Final	
Athlete	Event	Result	Rank (Note: Ranks given are within the heat)	Result	Rank (Note: Ranks given are within the semifinal)	Result	Rank
Doug Harris	Men's 800 m	1:56.6	2 Q	DNF		did not advance	
John Holland	Men's 400 m hurdles	54.6	1 Q	53.9	6	did not advance	
Harold Nelson	Men's 5000 m	15:34.4	6	—N/a		did not advance	
Harold Nelson	Men's 10,000 m	—N/a					NP

== Boxing ==
Athlete	Event	Round of 32	Round of 16	Quarterfinals	Semifinals	Final	
Athlete	Event	Opposition Result	Opposition Result	Opposition Result	Opposition Result	Opposition Result	Rank
Bob Goslin	Featherweight	Johnson (USA); L RSC-3	Did not advance				

== Cycling ==
Athlete	Event	Time	Rank
Nick Carter	Men's individual road race	DNF	

== Swimming ==
Athlete	Event	Heat		Semifinal		Final	
Athlete	Event	Result	Rank (Note: Rank given is within the heat)	Result	Rank (Note: Rank given is within the semifinal)	Result	Rank
Ngaire Lane	Women's 100 m backstroke	1:18.8	2 Q	1:19.0	7	did not advance	

== Weightlifting ==
Athlete	Event	Press		Snatch		Clean & jerk		Total	Rank
Athlete	Event	Result	Rank	Result	Rank	Result	Rank	Total	Rank
Maurice Crow	Men's bantamweight	77.5	=12	85	=6	110	=7	272.5	8

== Officials ==
- Team manager – David Woodfield
- Chaperone – Mima Ingram
