= Theo Blankenaauw =

Dutch cyclist (1923–2011)

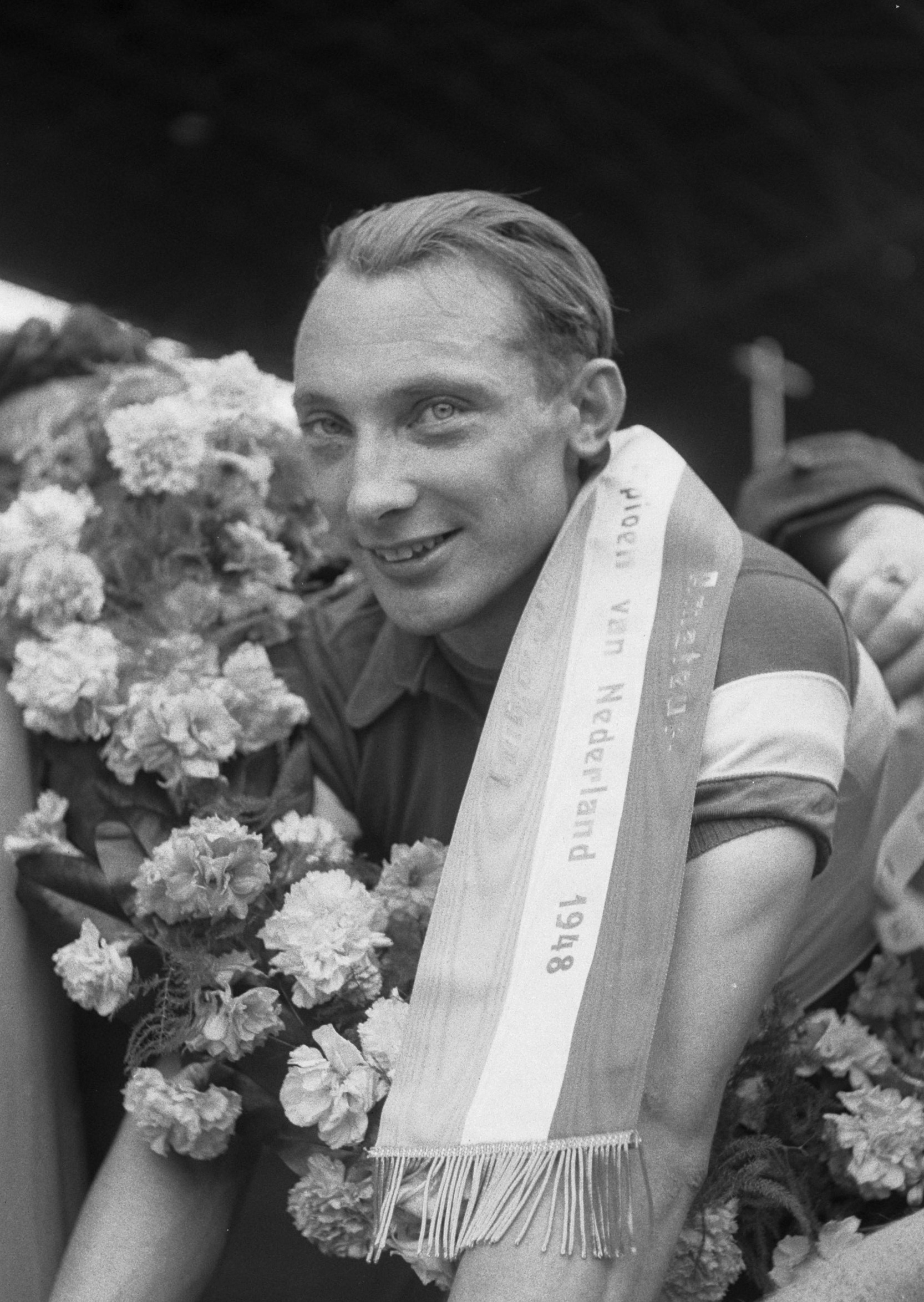
- Theo Blankenaauw in 1948

Personal information
- Born: 5 September 1923 Gennep, the Netherlands
- Died: 28 August 2011 (aged 87) Nijmegen, the Netherlands

Sport
- Sport: Cycling

Theodorus Petrus "Theo" Blankenaauw (also Blankenauw, 5 September 1923 – 28 August 2011) was a Dutch track cyclist. He competed at the 1948 Summer Olympics in the 1 km time trial and the 4 km team pursuit and finished in 12th place in the time trial.

== See also ==
- List of Dutch Olympic cyclists
