= Ton Richter =

Dutch field hockey player

Olympic medal record

Men's field hockey
Bronze medal – third place	1948 London	Team competition

Antonius "Ton" Maria Richter (November 16, 1919, Blaricum, North Holland – August 10, 2009) was a Dutch field hockey player who competed in the 1948 Summer Olympics. He was born in Blaricum. He was a member of the Dutch field hockey team, which won the bronze medal. He played all seven matches as goalkeeper.
