= Monique Berlioux =

French swimmer

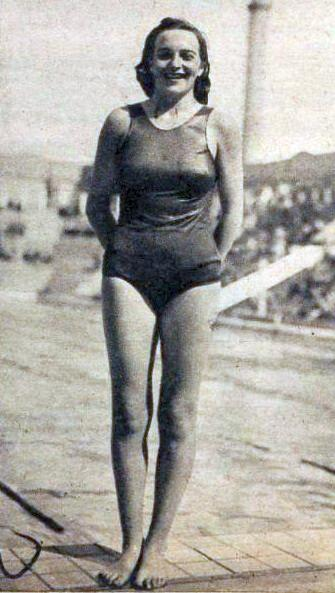
- Monique Berlioux in 1943

Personal information
- Born: 22 December 1923 Metz, France
- Died: 27 August 2015 (aged 91) Paris, France

Sport
- Sport: Swimming

Monique Berlioux (22 December 1923 – 27 August 2015) was a French swimmer and the director of the International Olympic Committee from 1971 to 1985.

Berlioux was educated at Sorbonne University and pursued a career in journalism. During World War II, she worked with the French Resistance, swimming across the Seine to deliver messages about German intelligence. She competed in the women's 100 metre backstroke at the 1948 Summer Olympics. Despite being of French nationality she won the ASA National British Championships 150 yards backstroke title in 1946.

Berlioux began working at the International Olympic Committee in the 1960s and became the IOC's media chief. She was appointed as Director of the IOC in 1971, being the first woman to hold the position. She resigned in 1985 after discussions with IOC President Juan Antonio Samaranch.
