= Jenne Langhout =

Dutch field hockey player

Olympic medal record

Men's field hockey
Bronze medal – third place	1948 London	Team competition

Jenne Langhout (September 27, 1918 – March 29, 2010) was a Dutch field hockey player who competed in the 1948 Summer Olympics. He was born in Batavia, Dutch East Indies.

He was a member of the Dutch field hockey team, which won the bronze medal. He played all seven matches as halfback.
