= Joop Rohner =

Dutch water polo player (1927–2005)

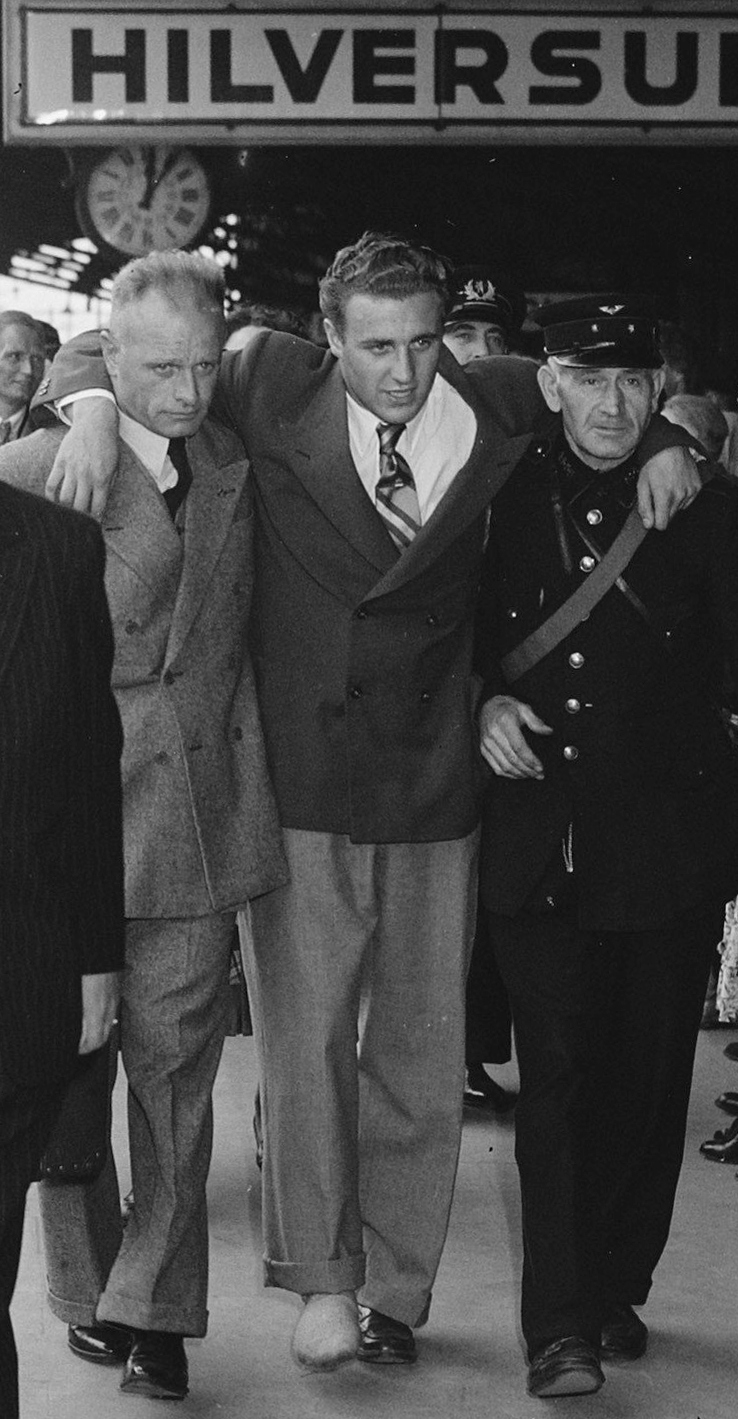
- Rohner with coach Jan Stender (left) at the Hilversum train station in 1948

Personal information
- Born: 6 July 1927 Amsterdam, the Netherlands
- Died: 25 January 2005 (aged 77) Hobart, Tasmania, Australia

Sport
- Sport: Water polo
- Club: HZC de Robben, Hilversum
Medal record
Representing the Netherlands
Olympic Games
Bronze medal – third place	1948 London	Team competition

Johannes "Joop" Jacobus Rohner (6 July 1927 – 25 January 2005) was a Dutch water polo goalkeeper who won a bronze medal at the 1948 Summer Olympics.

== See also ==
- Netherlands men's Olympic water polo team records and statistics
- List of Olympic medalists in water polo (men)
- List of men's Olympic water polo tournament goalkeepers
