= Hans Stam =

Dutch water polo player (1919–1996)

Personal information
- Born: 2 April 1919 Cirebon, Dutch East Indies
- Died: 25 June 1996 (aged 77) The Hague, Netherlands

Sport
- Sport: Water polo
Medal record
Representing Netherlands
Olympic Games
Bronze medal – third place	1948 London	Team competition
European Championships
Bronze medal – third place	1938 London	Team competition

Hans Stam (2 April 1919 – 25 June 1996) was a Dutch water polo player who competed in the 1948 Summer Olympics.

He was part of the Dutch team which won the bronze medal. He played five matches.

== See also ==
- List of Olympic medalists in water polo (men)
