= Ngaire Lane =

New Zealand swimmer (1925–2021)

Ngaire Galloway
Personal information
- Born: Ngaire Lane; 31 October 1925 Cambridge, New Zealand
- Died: 9 July 2021 (aged 95) Nelson, New Zealand
- Education: Otago Girls' High School
- Years active: 1940–1949
- Spouse: Kenneth Miller Galloway (m. 1949; died 2007)

Sport
- Country: New Zealand
- Sport: Swimming

Achievements and titles
- National finals: New Zealand; 100 yds backstroke champion (1944–49); 220 yds backstroke champion (1944–49); 100 yds medley champion (1947); 50 yds freestyle champion (1947); United Kingdom; 100 m backstroke champion (1948)

Ngaire Galloway JP (née Lane; 31 October 1925 – 9 July 2021) was a New Zealand swimmer, who represented her country at the 1948 Summer Olympics in London.

== Early life ==
Galloway was born Ngaire Lane in Cambridge on 31 October 1925, the daughter of Mabel Doris Lane (née Saxby) and William George Lane. She was educated at Otago Girls' High School.

== Swimming career ==
In 1940, Lane was the New Zealand junior champion in 50 and 100 yards freestyle and 50 yards backstroke, equalling the national junior record in the latter event. In 1943 she broke the national intermediate 100 yards backstroke record, and the following year she broke the national senior record for 220 yards backstroke, thus becoming the first female swimmer to hold junior, intermediate and senior national records concurrently. She was the national champion for the 100 yards and 220 yards backstroke every year from 1944 to 1949, and in 1947 she also won the 100 yards medley and 50 yards freestyle titles.

Lane travelled to London in 1948 as the only swimmer and only woman on the New Zealand team at the Olympic Games. Before the games, she swam in the 1948 ASA British Championships 100 yards backstroke and won the event. At the Olympics, she reached the semi-finals of the 100 m backstroke, where she finished seventh in a time of 1:19.0. At the conclusion of the Olympic swim meet, Lane was part of an Australasian team that finished third in the 4 × 100 m freestyle relay at the Continental Relay Gala.

== Later life and death ==
On 21 May 1949, Lane married Kenneth Miller Galloway—a medical student at the University of Otago—in Thames, and the couple moved to Nelson the following year. The couple went on to have five children. Ken Galloway died in 2007.

Ngaire Galloway was appointed as a justice of the peace in 1980, and as a marriage celebrant in 1983. She served as a member of the Nelson College board of trustees, and was the first woman to be president of the Nelson Tasman Justice of the Peace Association. In 2011, she was inducted into Nelson's Legends of Sport. Galloway's granddaughter, Gina Galloway, won a bronze medal in the 100 m backstroke at the 2017 Commonwealth Youth Games and competed at the 2018 Summer Youth Olympics.

Galloway died in Nelson on 9 July 2021, aged 95. She was the last surviving member of the 1948 New Zealand Olympic team.

== Honorific eponym ==
in 1996, the Nelson City Council named a pedestrian walkway and street, adjacent to the city's Riverside Pool, Ngaire Lane and Ngaire Place, respectively, in Galloway's honour.
