= Hennie Keetelaar =

Dutch water polo player (1927–2002)

Personal information
- Born: 23 January 1927 Hilversum, the Netherlands
- Died: 28 January 2002 (aged 75) Alphen aan den Rijn, the Netherlands

Sport
- Sport: Water polo
- Club: HZC de Robben, Hilversum
Medal record
Representing the Netherlands
Olympic Games
| Bronze medal – third place | 1948 London | Team |
European Championships
| Gold medal – first place | 1950 Vienna | Team |

Hendrikus "Hennie" Zacharias Keetelaar (23 January 1927 – 28 January 2002) was a Dutch water polo competitor. He played two matches at the 1948 Summer Olympics where his team won a bronze medal. He won a European title two years later.

== See also ==
- List of Olympic medalists in water polo (men)
