= Cor Braasem =

Dutch water polo player (1923–2009)

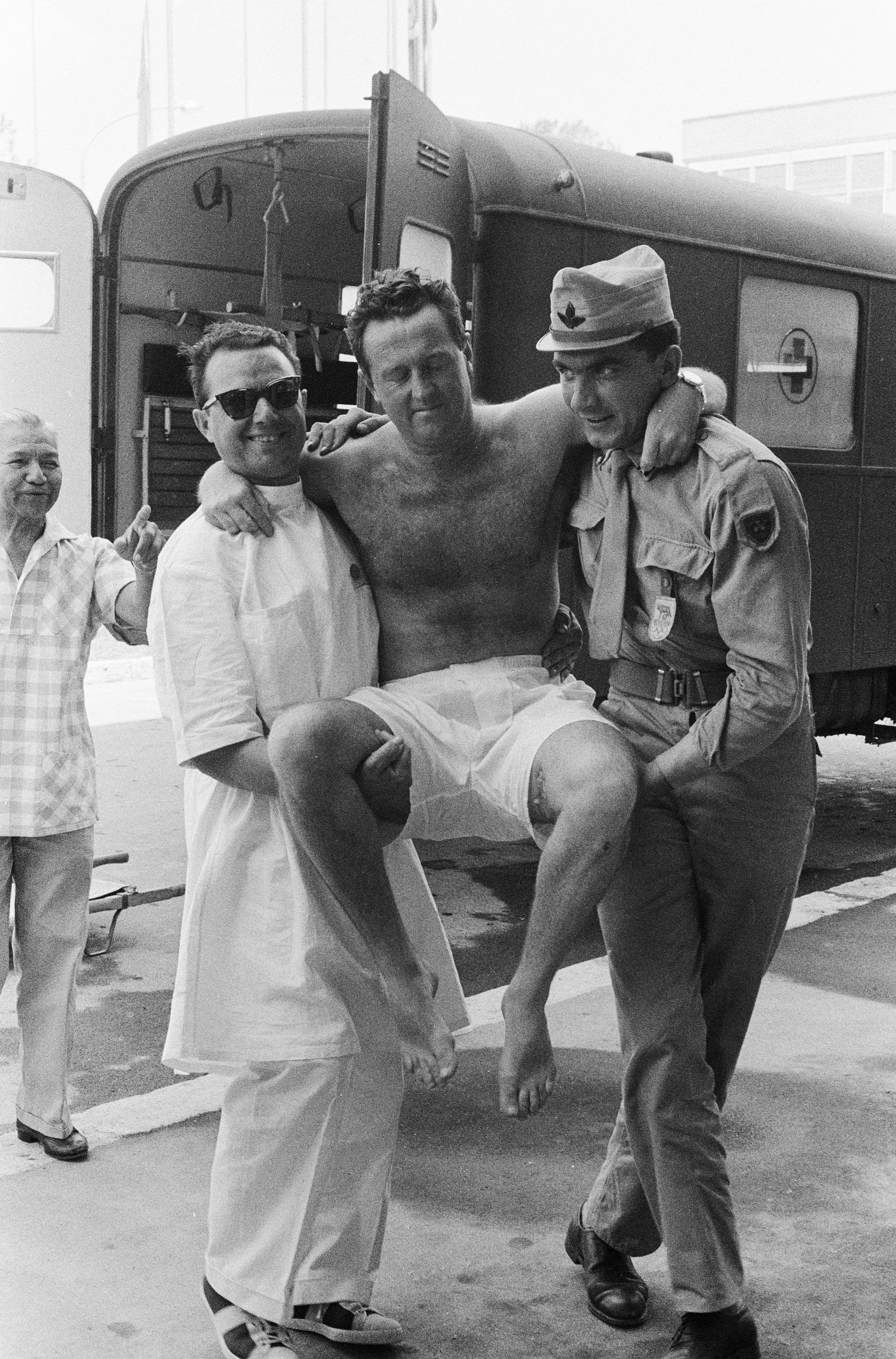
- Braasem at the 1960 Olympics

Personal information
- Born: 15 May 1923 Sumuran, Sibolga, Indonesia
- Died: 14 February 2009 (aged 85) Alicante, Spain

Sport
- Sport: Water polo
- Club: HZ ZIAN, The Hague
Medal record
Representing the Netherlands
Olympic Games
| Bronze medal – third place | 1948 London | Team |
European Championships
| Gold medal – first place | 1950 Viena | Team |

Cornelius "Cor" Braasem (15 May 1923 – 14 February 2009) was a Dutch water polo player and coach, who captained the Dutch team at the 1948 and 1952 Summer Olympics and trained it for the 1960 Games. He won a bronze medal in 1948, scoring six goals in seven matches. Four years later he played all nine matches and scored at least five goals (not all scorers are known). Though beating all their opponents, except for a 4:4 draw against the eventual winner Hungary, the Dutch team took fifth place through a dubious incident: after Yugoslavia lost to the Netherlands 2:3, it challenged the result based on a supposed partisanship of a referee, and won the replay 2:1.

Braasem won the European title in 1950. After retiring from competitions in 1953 he worked in Barcelona, coaching both the Barcelona team and the Spanish national team. From 1959 to 1962 he was the coach of the Dutch national team, which placed eighth at the 1960 Summer Olympics. He also was active as a sports commentator, among other at the 1968 Summer Olympics in Mexico. He lived the last forty years of his life in Spain.

== See also ==
- List of Olympic medalists in water polo (men)
