= Frits Ruimschotel =

Dutch water polo player (1922–1987)

Personal information
- Born: February 28, 1922 Pangkal Pinang, Dutch East Indies
- Died: May 28, 1987 (aged 65) Utrecht, Netherlands

Sport
- Sport: Water polo
Medal record
Representing Netherlands
Olympic Games
Bronze medal – third place	1948 London	Team competition

Albert Frits Ruimschotel (February 28, 1922 – May 28, 1987) was a Dutch water polo player who competed in the 1948 Summer Olympics.

== See also ==
- List of Olympic medalists in water polo (men)
