= Iet van Feggelen =

Dutch swimmer

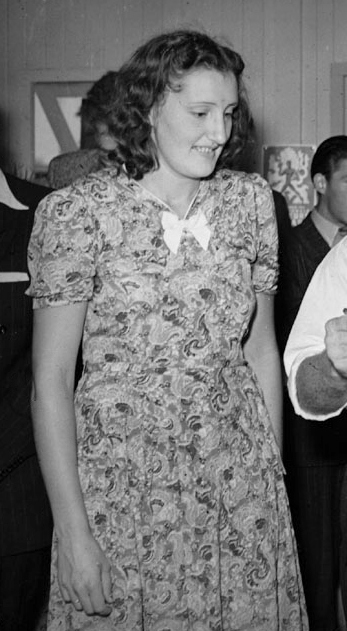
- Iet van Feggelen in 1947

Personal information
- Born: 20 August 1921 Amsterdam, the Netherlands
- Died: 17 July 2012 (aged 90) Amsterdam, the Netherlands

Sport
- Sport: Swimming
- Club: Het Y De Meeuwen
Medal record
Representing the Netherlands
European Championships
| Silver medal – second place | 1938 London | 100 m backstroke |
| Bronze medal – third place | 1947 Monte Carlo | 100 m backstroke |

Irène "Iet" Maria Jo Arnoldina van Feggelen (20 August 1921 – 17 July 2012) was a Dutch backstroke swimmer. Her first name is sometimes misspelled as Let, and her last name is often given as Koster–van Feggelen or Koster due to her marriage to the Dutch water polo player Ko Koster in 1943. Her career was hampered by World War II, yet she won two medals at the 1938 and 1947 European Aquatics Championships and set eleven world records between 1938 and 1947. After retirement, she became a national coach in conventional and synchronized swimming. In 2009, she was inducted to the International Swimming Hall of Fame.

== Biography ==
Van Feggelen was born to Ms. I. van Feggelen-Hogendijken and Mr. G.J.M. van Feggelen, she was an elder sister of the water polo player Ruud van Feggelen. Her father, the head of the local swimming club De Meeuwen Diemen, introduced her to swimming. She had soon showed talents in backstroke, but due her young age and the strong competition in this discipline in the Netherlands (Dutch women held most of the world backstroke records during the 1930s–1950s) was not selected for the 1936 Olympics. The forthcoming World War II effectively canceled her Olympic ambitions; nevertheless, she devoted herself to swimming. On 13 February 1938 she set her first world record and shortly after won a silver medal in the 100 m backstroke at the 1938 European Aquatics Championships, behind another Dutch swimmer Cor Kint. Within four weeks of October–November 1938 she set five world records; and two more followed in December 1938 and December 1939.

During the war, played some water polo and continued swimming, winning the national 100 m backstroke titles in 1941–1943. Her brother became a water polo player around that time, and in 1943 she married another water polo player Ko Koster. After 1938, her career spiked again in 1947, when within one week of April–May she set two world records in medley relay events, and shortly after won a bronze medal at the 1947 European Aquatics Championships in the 100 m backstroke.

In 1947, while touring the United States with Nel van Vliet, she became interested in synchronized swimming. After the birth of her second son in 1948 she retired from swimming and became a coach, both in conventional and synchronized swimming, and spent much efforts on popularizing the latter in Europe. For about 20 years from 1957 to 1970s she worked as a national team coach.
