= Piet Salomons =

Dutch water polo player (1924–1948)

Personal information
- Born: 14 July 1924 Batavia, Dutch East Indies
- Died: 8 October 1948 (aged 24) Schiedam, the Netherlands

Sport
- Sport: Water polo
- Club: HZ&PC, the Hague
Medal record
Representing the Netherlands
Olympic Games
Bronze medal – third place	1948 London	Team competition

Pieter "Piet" Johannes Alexander Salomons (14 July 1924 – 8 October 1948) was a Dutch water polo goalkeeper. He played two matches at the 1948 Summer Olympics where his team won a bronze medal. A few months after the games he took his own life by jumping in front of an oncoming train.

== See also ==
- Netherlands men's Olympic water polo team records and statistics
- List of Olympic medalists in water polo (men)
- List of men's Olympic water polo tournament goalkeepers
