= Dicky van Ekris =

Dutch swimmer (1932–2017)

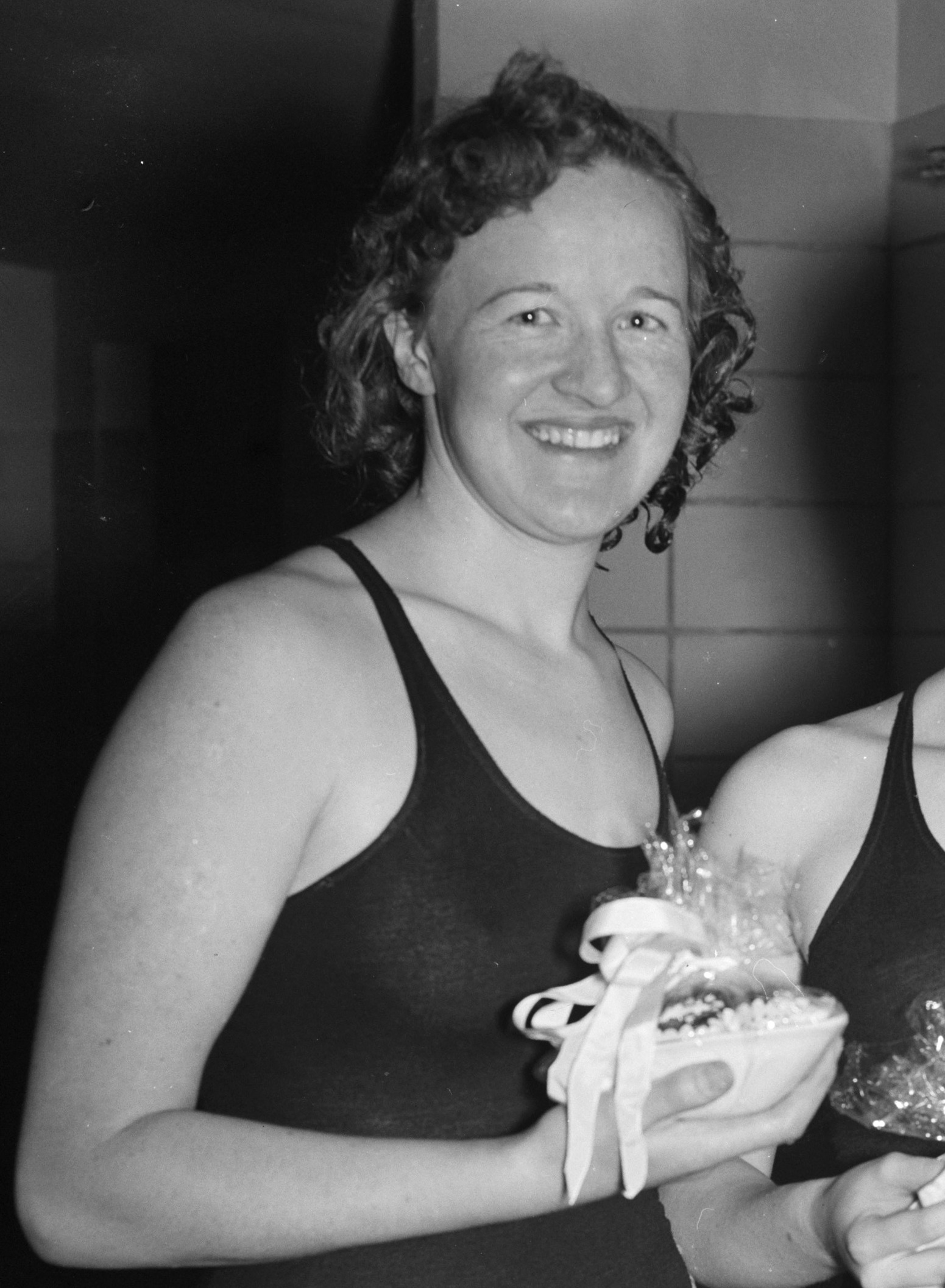
- Dicky van Ekris in 1958

Personal information
- Born: 3 September 1932 Hilversum, the Netherlands
- Died: 8 January 2017 (aged 84)

Sport
- Sport: Swimming
- Club: HZC de Robben, Hilversum
- Coach: Jan Stender

Dirkje "Dicky" van Ekris (3 September 1932 – 8 January 2017) was a Dutch swimmer. She competed in the 100 m backstroke at the 1948 Olympics and finished in sixth place.

She played water polo at HZC de Robben. From 1948 to 2010, she was a swimming teacher.
