= Aileen Allen =

American diver

Mary Aileen Conquest -Allen
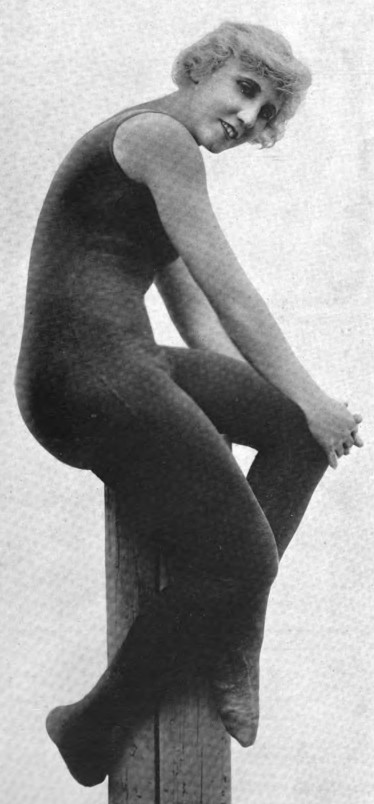
- Allen, circa 1918

Personal information
- Born: December 22, 1888 Prince Edward Island, Canada
- Died: September 4, 1950 (aged 61) Pasadena, California, United States
- Education: College of New Jersey
- Occupations: Swim, Dive, and Track Coach; Actress
- Height: 157 cm (5 ft 2 in)
- Spouse: Arthur Allen

Sport
- Sport: Diving
- Club: Los Angeles Athletic Club

Mary Aileen Allen, born Mary Conquest, (December 22, 1888 – September 4, 1950) was a Canadian-born American diver, swimmer, actress, and sports coach.

== Early life and education ==
Mary Aileen Conquest was born on December 22, 1888 on Prince Edward Island in Alberton, Canada. She was raised in Perth Amboy, New Jersey, United States, and graduated from Perth Amboy High School. She studied physical education at the Trenton School (now The College of New Jersey), and then pursued further studies in law for two years at George Washington University in Washington D.C. where she met and married Arthur Allen.

== Swimming and diving highlights ==
Allen and her husband moved from Washington D.C. to California where she began competing as a competitive swimmer and diver. In 1913, she was one of the founding members of an all-woman swimming club at the Bimini Baths in Los Angeles, California, which was formed in response to strict dress codes imposed by other clubs. She was later elected captain of the club.

In the Platform event, she was the 1917 AAU Outdoor Champion, and placed first in 1916 at the AAU Indoor Springboard title.

== Acting career ==
After winning both swimming and diving competitions held in Ocean Park, Santa Monica, she was cast as a water nymph in Norman K. Whisler's The Mystic Pool which was staged at the Hippodrome Theatre in Los Angeles in the summer of 1914. After this she became a member of Vivian Marshall's Bathing Beauties with whom she performed at the Pantages Theatre in San Francisco in October 1914. In January 1915 she returned to the Hippodrome Theatre; appearing in the featured act "Aileen Allen and her California Mermaids" in the musical extravaganza Hippodrome's Passing Show of 1914.

While maintaining a schedule as a competitive and exhibition diver and swimmer, Allen worked as an actress in silent films. She performed in several short films for Mack Sennett's Keystone Studios (KS) in which she appeared as one of the earliest bathing / diving beauties. The first of these was Their Husbands (1913) in which she appeared as herself. Other KS films she appeared in included Those Bitter Sweets (1915, as beach girl at picnic), and Settled at the Seaside (1915, as girl on pier). During World War I, she sold war bonds as a representative of KS.

Allen's other film work included an appearance in the newsreel series Mutual Weekly (No. 37 in 1915), and two short films for Pathé Exchange released in 1916: Luke and the Mermaids and Luke's Speedy Club Life. She appeared in one feature-length film for Metro Pictures; portraying Mrs. Westfall in Mister 44 in 1916. That same year she won the national competition in the ten foot springboard diving content. In 1917 she won the national high diving competition held in Rye, New York, and from 1915 to 1921 she had consecutive championship wins in far western and Pacific coast diving championships.

== 1920 Antwerp Olympics ==
Allen competed in the 1920 Summer Olympics in Antwerp where she finished fourth in the 3 metre springboard event.

=== Coaching ===
She served as the track and field coach for the women's team of the Pasadena Athletic Club during the 1920s where she was also active as a diving coach. One her students in Pasadena, Caroline Fletcher, won the national diving championship in 1923 and a bronze medal at the 1924 Summer Olympics. During the 1928 Summer Olympics, Allen served as the coach for the United States women's track and field team. She also coached the United States women's swim team during the 1932 Summer Olympics.

After leaving Pasadena, Allen was a longtime diving and swimming coach at the Los Angeles Athletic Club (LAAC). Esther Williams began training with Allen in 1937 at the LAAC. Allen was convinced that Esther could have a career in film, and it is through her persuasion that she met and signed a contract with talent manager Robert Marchetti who assisted her in her first but unsuccessful audition with Fox Studios. She coached Allen for 1939 win at the U.S., but had a falling out with the swimmer the following year after Williams discovered that Allen hid her invitation to the Pan American Games under the rationale that Williams would not be able to handle the temptations of men and alcohol in Buenos Aires. While this act of betrayal caused Williams to sever her relationship with Allen, years later Williams came to the conclusion that Allen was probably right, and that she may have saved her from making bad choices that could have negatively shaped her life.

Allen died at the age of 61 on September 4, 1950 in Pasadena, California.
