= Greetje Galliard =

Dutch swimmer (1926–2019)

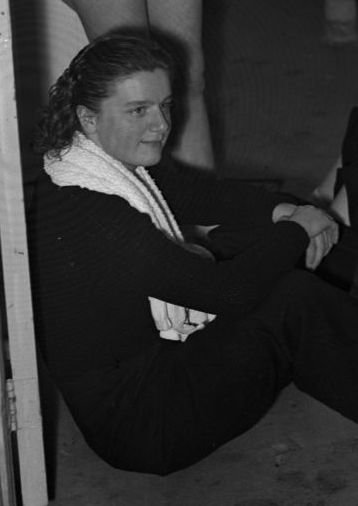
- Galliard in 1949

Personal information
- Born: 25 November 1926 Amsterdam, Netherlands
- Died: 22 October 2019 (aged 92) Rijswijk, Netherlands

Sport
- Sport: Swimming
- Club: ADZ, Amsterdam
Medal record
Swimming
Representing Netherlands
European Championships
Bronze medal – third place	1950 Vienna	100 m backstroke

Margaretha Cornelia Galliard (25 November 1926 – 22 October 2019) was a Dutch swimmer who won a bronze medal in the 100 m backstroke at the 1950 European Aquatics Championships. She finished eighth in the same event at the 1948 Summer Olympics.

She wins the 100 m backstroke at the Great Prize of the town of Paris in September 1950.

After marriage, she changed her last name from Galliard to van Leersum.

Galliard died in October 2019 at the age of 92.
