= Ruud van Feggelen =

Dutch water polo player (1924–2002)

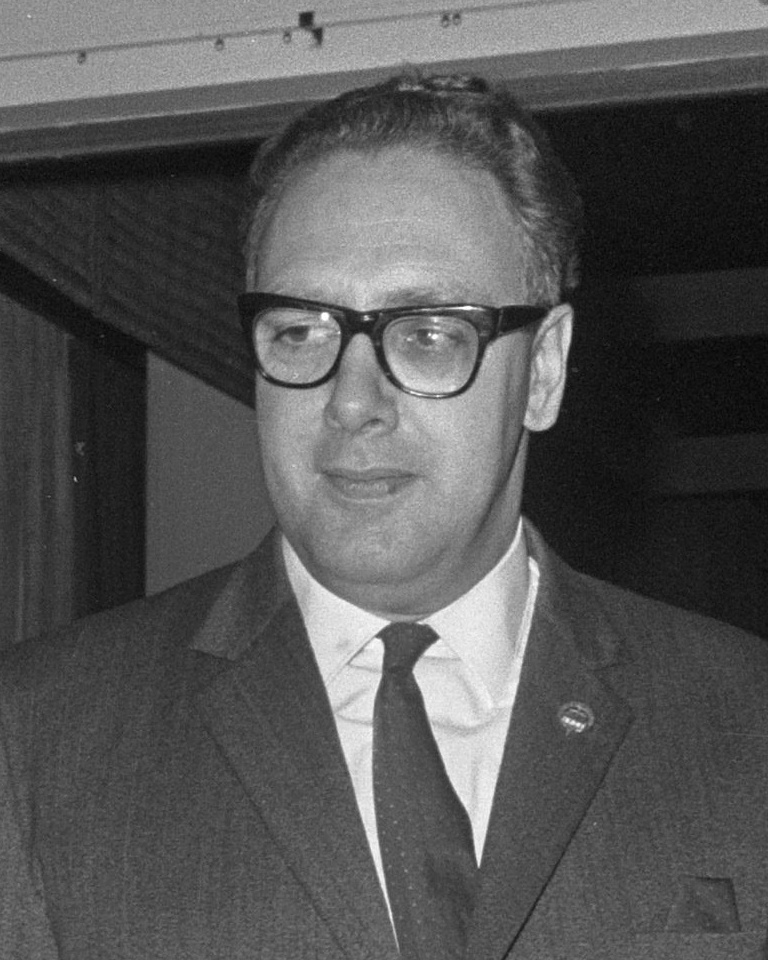
- Ruud van Feggelen in 1969

Personal information
- Born: 14 April 1924 Amsterdam, Netherlands
- Died: 9 August 2002 (aged 78) Deventer, Netherlands

Sport
- Sport: Water polo
- Club: De Meeuwen, Amsterdam
Medal record
Representing the Netherlands
Olympic Games
| Bronze medal – third place | 1948 London | Team |
European Championships
| Gold medal – first place | 1950 Vienna | Team |

Rudolf "Ruud" Frederik Otto van Feggelen (14 April 1924 – 9 August 2002) was a Dutch water polo competitor and coach.

== Biography ==
Van Feggelen won a European title in 1950 and was the best Dutch player at the 1948 and 1952 Summer Olympics, scoring 16 goals in 1948 and 18 goals in 1952; his teams placed third and fifth, respectively. After retirement, he coached the national team between 1962 and 1966. In his honor, the Ruud van Feggelen-Award was established to distinguish the water polo player of the year in the Netherlands.

Van Feggelen was born to Ms. I. van Feggelen-Hogendijken and Mr. G.J.M. van Feggelen; his elder sister Iet van Feggelen was an international swimmer. Feggelen got married on 20 October 1949.

== See also ==
- Netherlands men's Olympic water polo team records and statistics
- List of Olympic medalists in water polo (men)
- List of men's Olympic water polo tournament top goalscorers
