= Multnomah Athletic Club =

Private club in Portland, Oregon, U.S.

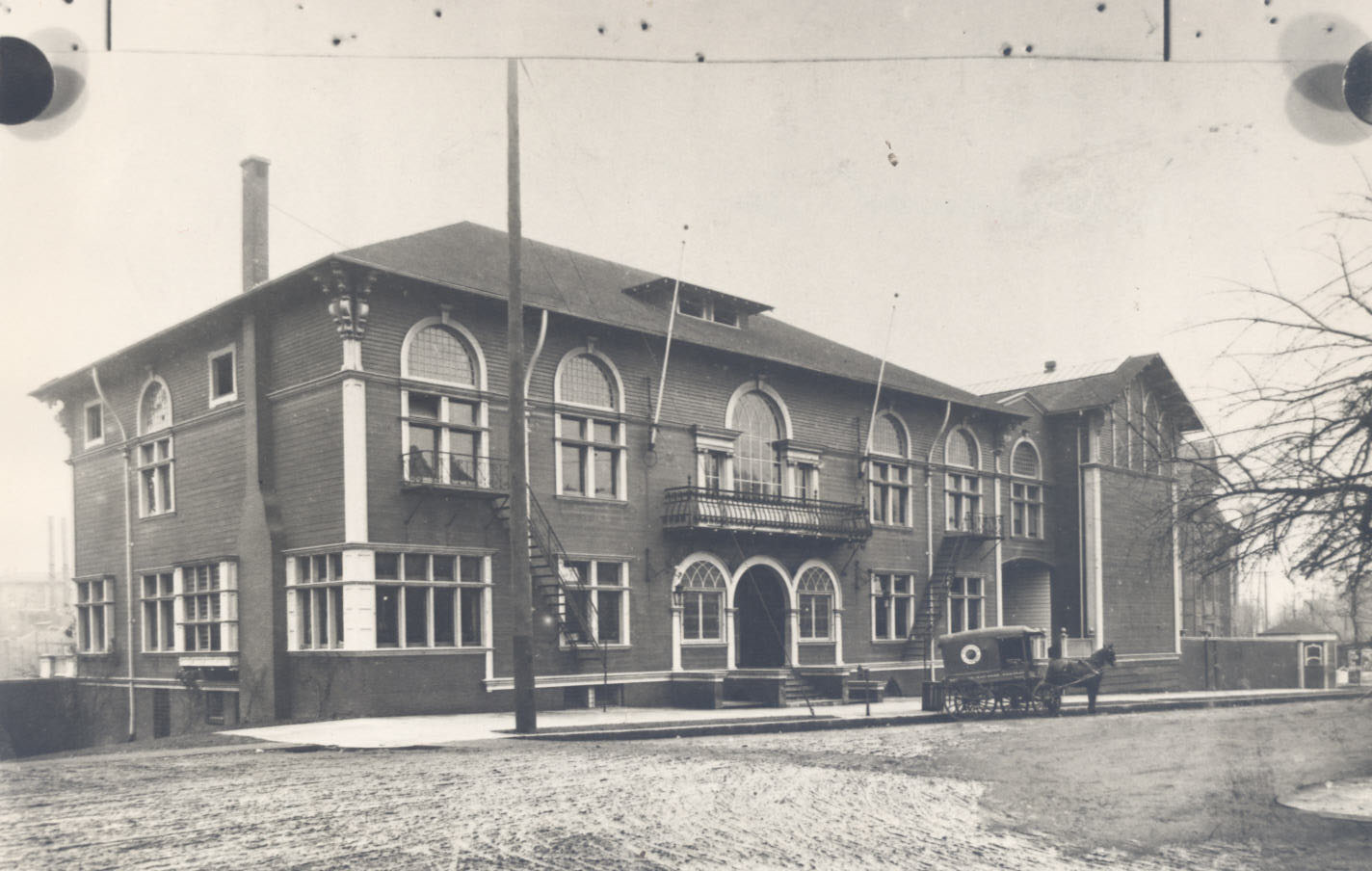
- Multnomah Athletic Club's clubhouse in 1910
- Abbreviation: M.A.C.
- Formation: February 1891
- Type: Social and recreational club
- Registration no.: 93-0232310
- Location: Portland, Oregon, United States
- Coordinates: 45.5206°N 122.6927°W
- Members: about 21,000 (May 2026)
- Key people: Daniel Williams (president); Charles Leverton (general manager)
- Revenue: $52.1 million (2023)
- Website: themac.com

The Multnomah Athletic Club (MAC) is a private social and athletic club in Portland, Oregon, United States organized as a 501c7 non-profit. It was founded in 1891 as the Multnomah Amateur Athletic Club, a coordinating body for team and individual sports such as track and field, football, and basketball and fielded its own competitive teams against collegiate competition. As of May 2026, it provides athletic and dining facilities to its 21,000 dues-paying members.

The MAC was the target of a suicide bombing in May 2026. A disgruntled former employee, fired in 2019, drove an explosives-filled vehicle into the club in middle of the night.

== History ==
The Multnomah Athletic Club was founded in 1891 as the Multnomah Amateur Athletic Club. It is located in Portland, Oregon's Goose Hollow neighborhood, occupying two buildings adjacent to the Providence Park sports stadium. It is governed under laws for 501(c)(7) Social and recreational clubs. In 2024 it claimed $55,959,896 in total revenue and total assets of $116,576,907. The Multnomah Athletic Foundation at the same address is a 501(c)(3) Public Charity. In 2024 it claimed $377,604 in total revenue and $3,613,692 in total assets.

The club hosted annual outdoor athletic games in Portland, with the inaugural event taking place in September 1891. The event included a traditional spectrum of track and field events, including sprints, middle distance races, and a one-mile run, hurdling, high and long jumping, pole vaulting, the hammer throw and shot put, as well as a one-mile race walk and a two-mile bicycle race. These annual competitions were open to any member of a valid athletic club, military unit, or institution of higher learning.

Bicycle racing was an important part of the club's activities during its first decade, with one of its members claiming world records in the one-mile and ten-mile bicycle race from a standing start in 1894.

Multnomah Amateur Athletic Club also served as the organizer of its own teams, playing football against other clubs from its inception. Chief rivals on the gridiron during the ensuing two decades included the teams of the Seattle Athletic Club and Spokane Amateur Athletic Club; regular games against Oregon college teams were also played.

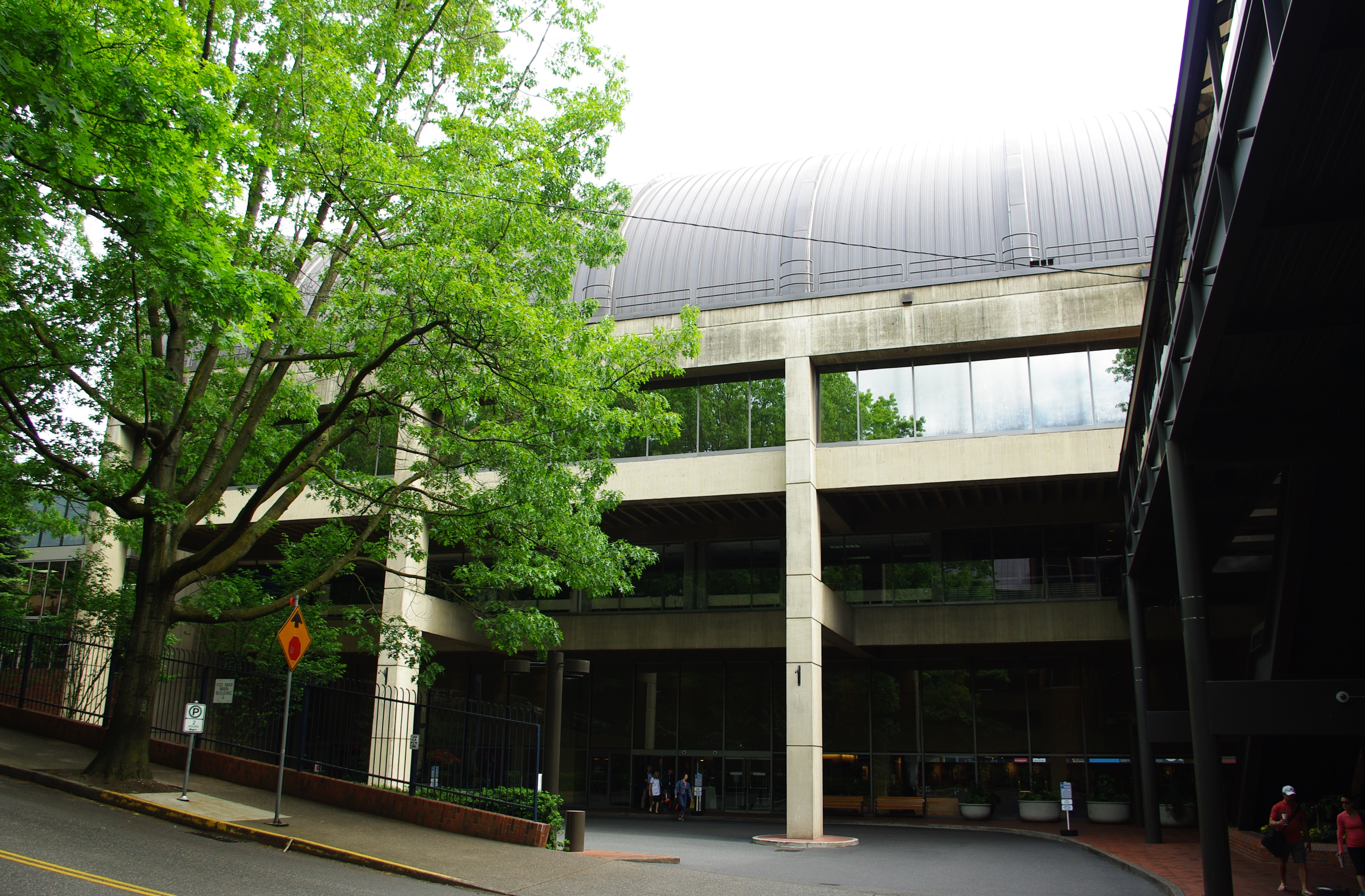
The entrance to the Multnomah Athletic Club photographed in 2014.

The club is known for its exclusivity and was historically male-dominated. Women members were not given full voting privileges until 1977. Jews were also not allowed to be MAC members until 1958.

New memberships are chosen by a lottery, however applicants who don't know a current member may be asked to present a reference letter.

It has been called "the only club in town that matters" and Nike had paid for one of its former executive's MAC membership at company expense to "help him integrate into the Portland business community"

The general manager's salary in 2017 was around $719,000, which makes his salary among the highest non-profit executive salaries in Portland outside of the medical sector.

== 2026 bombing ==
On May 2, 2026, a former MAC employee drove a car packed with explosive devices into the club's lobby in what has been described as an apparent suicide bombing attack. The sole occupant of the car was found dead after some explosives detonated and caused significant damage to the facility. No one else was killed or injured. The suspect Bruce Whitman worked as a bartender at the club but was fired in 2019 due to "unspecified conduct concerns". He had a known history of fixation with MAC, including engaging in club-related conspiracy theories and threatening MAC's members, dating back to 2021.

=== Sexual harassment incident ===
Whitman alleged that he and other male employees were subject to sexual harassment by a supervisor over a period of years and it was inadequately addressed by MAC's human resources department. He filed a complaint to the state's Bureau of Labor and Industry in 2015. BOLI determined his complaint was valid and he had been sexually harassed. It was dismissed only due to being past statute of limitations which at the time was one year, which has since been extended to five years. The supervisor in question had been given a professional conduct warning.

== Facilities ==
The club's primary facility is an eight-level main clubhouse located adjacent to Providence Park. The club's facilities total 600,000 square feet (56,000 m^{2}), making it the largest indoor athletic club in the world. The facility closed temporarily due to the damage from the May 2026 bombing incident, most of which was water damage from the sprinkler system.
