= Cycling at the 1948 Summer Olympics – Men's sprint =

Olympic cycling event

Men's sprint at the Games of the XIV Olympiad
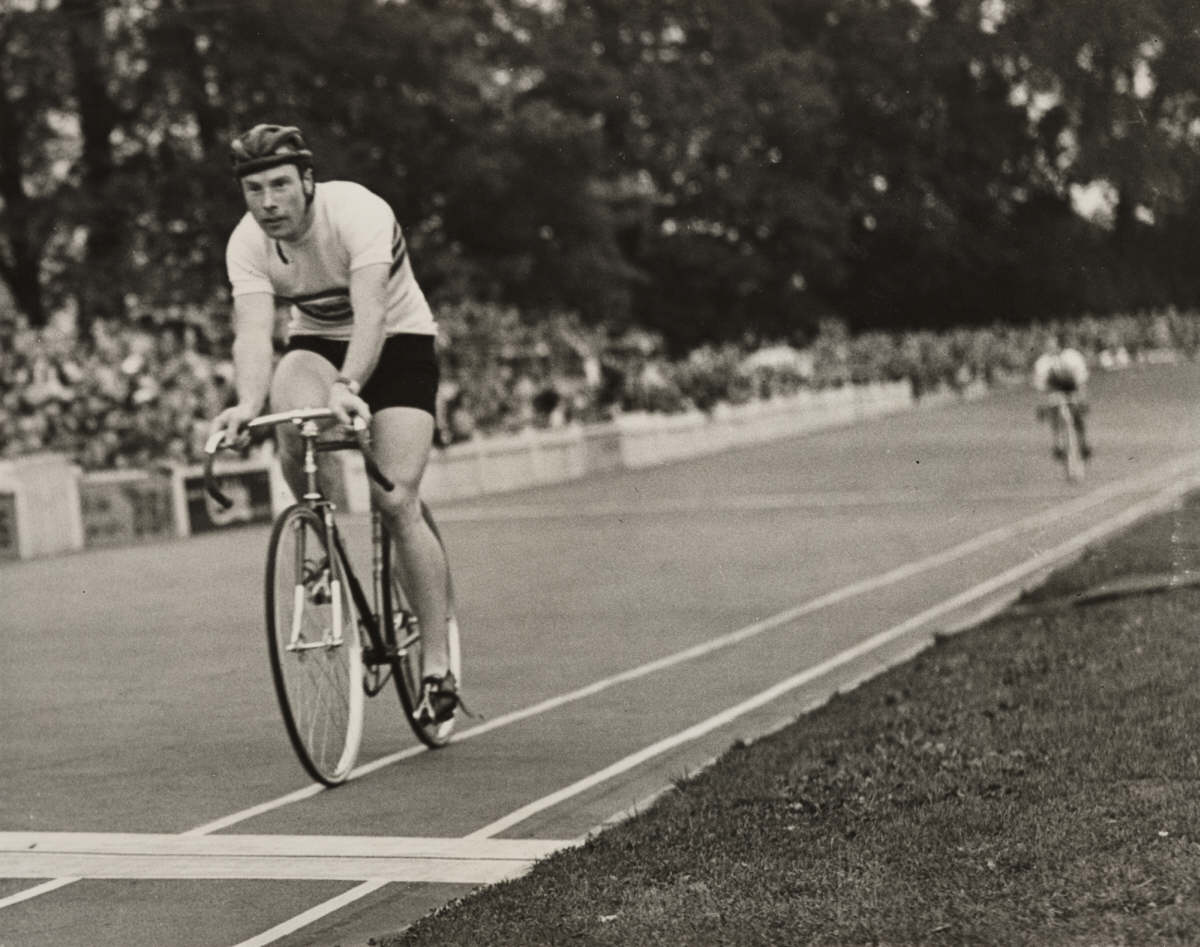
- A quarterfinal race, with Reg Harris defeating Mario Masanés
- Venue: Herne Hill Velodrome, London
- Dates: 7–9 August 1948
- Competitors: 23 from 23 nations

Medalists
1st place, gold medalist(s)		Mario Ghella; Italy
2nd place, silver medalist(s)		Reg Harris; Great Britain
3rd place, bronze medalist(s)		Axel Schandorff; Denmark

The men's sprint cycling event at the 1948 Summer Olympics took place between 7 and 9 August and was one of six events at the 1948 Olympics. There were 23 cyclists from 23 nations, with each nation limited to one competitor. The event was won by Mario Ghella of Italy, the nation's first victory in the men's sprint. Reg Harris of Great Britain, heavily favored coming into the event, finished with silver, the first medal for a British cyclist in the sprint since 1920. Axel Schandorff's bronze was Denmark's first medal in the event since 1928. The podium streaks of the Netherlands (five Games) and France (four Games) both ended, with neither nation's cyclist able to advance to the quarterfinals.

== Background ==
This was the ninth appearance of the event, which has been held at every Summer Olympics except 1904 and 1912. None of the semifinalists from 1936 returned, but Howard Wing of China competed again after the 12-year break occasioned by World War II. The heavy favorite and host nation hero was 1947 World Champion Reg Harris; his biggest rival, Cor Bijster of the Netherlands, had turned professional and could not compete in the Games.

Cuba, Guyana, India, Pakistan, Trinidad and Tobago, Uruguay, and Venezuela each made their debut in the men's sprint. France made its ninth appearance, the only nation to have competed at every appearance of the event.

== Competition format ==
This track cycling event consisted of numerous rounds. Each race involved the riders starting simultaneously and next to each other, from a standing start. Because the early part of races tend to be slow-paced and highly tactical, only the time for the last 200 metres of the race is typically recorded (though the full time for these Games was recorded as well). The distance for the sprint in 1948 was actually 920 metres instead of the standard 1000 metres, to be exactly two laps of the track.

The first two rounds consisted of single races between pairs of cyclists. The berths in the second round were allocated to the winners from each of the races in the first round, and the winners from each race in the repechage round. Starting with the quarterfinals stage, cyclists were paired once again, this time racing against each other two times, with the winner advancing further in the competition. This was the first time that the best-of-three format was used for the quarterfinals and semifinals (having been introduced in 1932 for the final and expanded to the bronze medal match in 1936).

== Records ==
The records for the sprint are 200 metre flying time trial records, kept for the qualifying round in later Games as well as for the finish of races.

World record	Unknown	Unknown^{*}	Unknown	Unknown
Olympic record	Thomas Johnson (GBR)	11.8	Antwerp, Belgium	9 August 1920

^{*} World records were not tracked by the UCI until 1954.

No new Olympic record was set during the competition.

== Schedule ==
All times are British Summer Time (UTC+1)

Date	Time	Round
Saturday, 7 August 1948	10:30	Round 1 Repechage; Round 2 Quarterfinals 1–3
Monday, 9 August 1948	16:00	Round 2 heat 2 re-run Quarterfinal 4 Semifinals; Finals

== Results ==
=== Round 1 ===
==== Round 1 heat 1 ====
Rocca won by two lengths.

Rank	Cyclist	Nation	Time total	Time 200 m	Notes
1	Leonel Rocca	Uruguay	3:10.9	12.6	Q
2	Compton Gonsalves	Trinidad and Tobago			R

==== Round 1 heat 2 ====
Van De Velde won by a wheel. Wing broke his collar bone after the race.

Rank	Cyclist	Nation	Time total	Time 200 m	Notes
1	Emile Van De Velde	Belgium	2:48.2	13.6	Q
2	Howard Wing	Republic of China			R

==== Round 1 heat 3 ====
Roth won by inches.

Rank	Cyclist	Nation	Time total	Time 200 m	Notes
1	Jean Roth	Switzerland	2:31.5	13.0	Q
2	Mario Masanés	Chile			R

==== Round 1 heat 4 ====
Harris won by a length.

Rank	Cyclist	Nation	Time total	Time 200 m	Notes
1	Reg Harris	Great Britain	2:17.0	14.4	Q
2	Rusi Mulla Feroze	India			R

==== Round 1 heat 5 ====
Hijzelendoorn won by half a length.

Rank	Cyclist	Nation	Time total	Time 200 m	Notes
1	Jan Hijzelendoorn	Netherlands	1:42.7	13.3	Q
2	Reinaldo Paseiro	Cuba			R

==== Round 1 heat 6 ====
Cortoni won by two lengths.

Rank	Cyclist	Nation	Time total	Time 200 m	Notes
1	Clodomiro Cortoni	Argentina	1:58.0	12.4	Q
2	Julio César León	Venezuela			R

==== Round 1 heat 7 ====
Schandorff won by a length.

Rank	Cyclist	Nation	Time total	Time 200 m	Notes
1	Axel Schandorff	Denmark	1:49.8	12.5	Q
2	Charlie Bazzano	Australia			R

==== Round 1 heat 8 ====
Bellenger won by two lengths.

Rank	Cyclist	Nation	Time total	Time 200 m	Notes
1	Jacques Bellenger	France	2:09.1	12.5	Q
2	Laddie Lewis	Guyana			R

==== Round 1 heat 9 ====
Welt won by half a length.

Rank	Cyclist	Nation	Time total	Time 200 m	Notes
1	Erich Welt	Austria	3:13.9	17.2	Q
2	Adolfo Romero	Mexico			R

==== Round 1 heat 10 ====
Heid won by two lengths.

Rank	Cyclist	Nation	Time total	Time 200 m	Notes
1	Jack Heid	United States	1:57.4	13.0	Q
2	Muhammad Naqi Mallick	Pakistan			R

==== Round 1 heat 11 ====
Ghella won easily.

Rank	Cyclist	Nation	Time total	Time 200 m	Notes
1	Mario Ghella	Italy	1:54.4	12.9	Q
2	Bob Lacourse	Canada			R

=== Repechage ===
Howard Wing from China broke his collar bone after finishing his first round race. Manthos Kaloudis from Greece, who had arrived late and missed the first round, took his place.

==== Repechage heat 1 ====
Lacourse won by two lengths.

Rank	Cyclist	Nation	Time total	Time 200 m	Notes
1	Bob Lacourse	Canada	1:48.1	13.7	Q
2	Adolfo Romero	Mexico			

==== Repechage heat 2 ====
Paseiro won by two lengths.

Rank	Cyclist	Nation	Time total	Time 200 m	Notes
1	Reinaldo Paseiro	Cuba	3:15.3	14.5	Q
2	Rusi Mulla Feroze	India			

==== Repechage heat 3 ====
Bazzano won by two lengths.

Rank	Cyclist	Nation	Time total	Time 200 m	Notes
1	Charlie Bazzano	Australia	2:31.0	14.1	Q
2	Muhammad Naqi Mallick	Pakistan			

==== Repechage heat 4 ====
León won by a length.

Rank	Cyclist	Nation	Time total	Time 200 m	Notes
1	Julio César León	Venezuela	2:04.7	12.6	Q
2	Compton Gonsalves	Trinidad and Tobago			

==== Repechage heat 5 ====
Masanés beat replacement rider Kaloudis by two lengths, with Lewis finishing third.

Rank	Cyclist	Nation	Time total	Time 200 m	Notes
1	Mario Masanés	Chile	1:55.3	13.3	Q
2	Manthos Kaloudis	Greece			
3	Laddie Lewis	Guyana			

=== Round 2 ===
The race between Jan Hijzelendoorn from the Netherlands and Leonel Rocca from Uruguay was repeated following a protest from Uruguay after the disqualification of Rocca.

==== Round 2 heat 1 ====
Ghella won by four lengths.

Rank	Cyclist	Nation	Time total	Time 200 m	Notes
1	Mario Ghella	Italy	1:48.1	12.0	Q
2	Julio César León	Venezuela			

==== Round 2 heat 2 ====
There was a crash at the very end of the race, with Hijzelendoorn unable to finish and Rocca disqualified. The Uruguayan team protested the result, however, and the protest was successful. The heat was ordered to be re-run on the next day of competition (two days later). The delay for the appeal led to 40 minutes of inactivity on the track, which the spectators did not appreciate. The result also delayed the start of the later rounds from Saturday to Monday. In the re-run, Rocca won by two lengths.

Original

Rank	Cyclist	Nation	Time total	Time 200 m	Notes
1	Jan Hijzelendoorn	Netherlands	DNF		Re-run
2	Leonel Rocca	Uruguay	DSQ	13.2	Re-run

Re-run

Rank	Cyclist	Nation	Time total	Time 200 m	Notes
1	Leonel Rocca	Uruguay	1:35.9	13.5	Q
2	Jan Hijzelendoorn	Netherlands			

==== Round 2 heat 3 ====
Masanés won by inches.

Rank	Cyclist	Nation	Time total	Time 200 m	Notes
1	Mario Masanés	Chile	3:04.5	12.8	Q
2	Jacques Bellenger	France			

==== Round 2 heat 4 ====
Schandorff won easily.

Rank	Cyclist	Nation	Time total	Time 200 m	Notes
1	Axel Schandorff	Denmark	1:49.6	12.5	Q
2	Erich Welt	Austria			

==== Round 2 heat 5 ====
Van De Velde won by half a wheel.

Rank	Cyclist	Nation	Time total	Time 200 m	Notes
1	Emile Van De Velde	Belgium	3:46.5	13.0	Q
2	Reinaldo Paseiro	Cuba			

==== Round 2 heat 6 ====
Heid won by an inch.

Rank	Cyclist	Nation	Time total	Time 200 m	Notes
1	Jack Heid	United States	2:05.7	12.0	Q
2	Clodomiro Cortoni	Argentina			

==== Round 2 heat 7 ====
Bazzano won by one and a half lengths.

Rank	Cyclist	Nation	Time total	Time 200 m	Notes
1	Charlie Bazzano	Australia	3:51.6	14.3	Q
2	Jean Roth	Switzerland			

==== Round 2 heat 8 ====
Harris won by a length.

Rank	Cyclist	Nation	Time total	Time 200 m	Notes
1	Reg Harris	Great Britain	1:31.7	15.1	Q
2	Bob Lacourse	Canada			

=== Quarterfinals ===
==== Quarterfinal 1 ====
Ghella won the first race by a length and the second by two lengths.

Rank	Cyclist	Nation	Race 1	Race 2	Race 3	Notes
1	Mario Ghella	Italy	1:47.7; 12.1	2:37.4; 12.6	—N/a	Q
2	Emile Van De Velde	Belgium			—N/a	

==== Quarterfinal 2 ====
Schandorff won the first race by a length and the second by two lengths.

Rank	Cyclist	Nation	Race 1	Race 2	Race 3	Notes
1	Axel Schandorff	Denmark	1:49.0; 12.3	2:14.8; 12.4	—N/a	Q
2	Jack Heid	United States			—N/a	

==== Quarterfinal 3 ====
Harris won both races by a length.

Rank	Cyclist	Nation	Race 1	Race 2	Race 3	Notes
1	Reg Harris	Great Britain	2:39.8; 12.5	2:13.0; 12.8	—N/a	Q
2	Mario Masanés	Chile			—N/a	

==== Quarterfinal 4 ====
Bazzano won the first race by a wheel and the second by a length and a half.

Rank	Cyclist	Nation	Race 1	Race 2	Race 3	Notes
1	Charlie Bazzano	Australia	3:09.4; 12.8	2:26.6; 13.2	—N/a	Q
2	Leonel Rocca	Uruguay			—N/a	

=== Semifinals ===
==== Semifinal 1 ====
Ghella won the first race by three-quarters of a length and the second by three lengths.

Rank	Cyclist	Nation	Race 1	Race 2	Race 3	Notes
1	Mario Ghella	Italy	3:53.0; 12.1	1:55.7; 11.9	—N/a	Q
2	Axel Schandorff	Denmark			—N/a	B

==== Semifinal 2 ====
Harris won the first race by a length and the second by three-quarters of a length.

Rank	Cyclist	Nation	Race 1	Race 2	Race 3	Notes
1	Reg Harris	Great Britain	4:43.8; 13.7	2:24.4; 12.7	—N/a	Q
2	Charlie Bazzano	Australia			—N/a	B

=== Finals ===
==== Bronze medal match ====
Schandorff won the first race by three-quarters of a length and the second by two lengths.

Rank	Cyclist	Nation	Race 1	Race 2	Race 3
3rd place, bronze medalist(s)	Axel Schandorff	Denmark	2:10.4; 12.9	2:26.0; 12.0	—N/a
4	Charlie Bazzano	Australia			—N/a

==== Final ====
Ghella won the first race by three lengths and the second by one and a half lengths. In the first, Ghella made his attack at the 300-yard mark, passing Harris on the inside (accorded a tactical error to leave space inside by the British cyclist). The final distance between the two was increased by Harris easing off to conserve energy for the second race. Doing so did him little good, however, as in the second race Ghella took the lead and fought off two challenges by Harris in the final two straights.

Rank	Cyclist	Nation	Race 1	Race 2	Race 3
1st place, gold medalist(s)	Mario Ghella	Italy	4:01.2; 12.2	4:13.4; 12.0	—N/a
2nd place, silver medalist(s)	Reg Harris	Great Britain			—N/a

== Final standings ==
Rank	Cyclist	Nation
1st place, gold medalist(s)	Mario Ghella	Italy
2nd place, silver medalist(s)	Reg Harris	Great Britain
3rd place, bronze medalist(s)	Axel Schandorff	Denmark
4	Charlie Bazzano	Australia
5	Jack Heid	United States
5	Mario Masanés	Chile
5	Leonel Rocca	Uruguay
5	Emile Van De Velde	Belgium
9	Julio César León	Venezuela
9	Jan Hijzelendoorn	Netherlands
9	Jacques Bellenger	France
9	Erich Welt	Austria
9	Reinaldo Paseiro	Cuba
9	Clodomiro Cortoni	Argentina
9	Jean Roth	Switzerland
9	Bob Lacourse	Canada
9	Adolfo Romero	Mexico
9	Rusi Mulla Feroze	India
9	Muhammad Naqi Mallick	Pakistan
9	Compton Gonsalves	Trinidad and Tobago
9	Manthos Kaloudis	Greece
9	Laddie Lewis	Guyana
9	Howard Wing	Republic of China
