= Venezuela at the 1948 Summer Olympics =

- IOC code: VEN
- NOC: Venezuelan Olympic Committee

in London, United Kingdom 29 July–14 August 1948
- Competitors: 1 in 1 sport
- Flag bearer: Julio César León
- Medals: Gold 0 Silver 0 Bronze 0 Total 0

Summer Olympics appearances (overview)
- 1948; 1952; 1956; 1960; 1964; 1968; 1972; 1976; 1980; 1984; 1988; 1992; 1996; 2000; 2004; 2008; 2012; 2016; 2020; 2024

Venezuela competed in the 1948 Summer Olympic Games held in London, United Kingdom. The country's first appearance at the Games, it sent one athlete, the cyclist Julio César León, and won no medals. León faced several difficulties before he could compete in the Games, receiving no support from the Venezuelan Olympic Committee until his arrival in London. He competed in two track cycling events, placing joint-ninth in the Sprint and 14th in the Time trial.

== Background ==
=== Organization ===
Venezuela was one of the fourteen nations that made their first official appearance at the Summer Olympics at the 1948 Games. Though the Venezuelan Olympic Committee (COV) had been recognized by the IOC in 1935, it was skeptical about their athletes' prospects when competing against European athletes, and so did not send anyone. The COV still did not want to send athletes in 1948, and, according to Julio César León, the only Venezuelan representative at the Games, said they would "make a fool of ourselves". Venezuela had been sent 50 registration forms in anticipation of the Games.^{:68}

=== León's journey ===
León, with the approval but not support of the COV, had to get support from the British Embassy in Caracas in order to travel to London. León's brother knew Raymond Smith, an attaché to the embassy. As such, his brother got León a meeting with the ambassador who quickly agreed to send León, his wife, and his coach to London on a Lancaster Bomber serving as a British Caribbean mail plane from Maiquetia Airport two days later. The journey across the Caribbean, stopping at all British territories, took four hours; the flight from Bermuda to London was delayed due to weather. León recalled that the total flight time, not including ground time during stops, was 36 hours. The group was accompanied by three journalists. There were no members of the COV traveling with them, which caused difficulty when León tried to register at the Games, as he had no paperwork; he had to liaise with officials from Trinidad and Tobago to get a call through to Julio Bustamante, the president of the COV, which led the committee to fly to London three days later to approve León in person.

== Opening ceremony ==
Neither León nor the COV took a Venezuelan flag to London; unaware of Olympic customs and thus that there would be a flag parade, the Venezuelan delegation only realized they would need one when an Argentine competitor who knew León from the South American circuit mentioned it to him in passing. The Venezuelan Embassy in London would not loan the COV a flag until after the opening ceremony, so León's wife sewed a makeshift flag from fabric they bought – cutting stars from dining room tablecloth – and he used a broom handle to carry it.

== Competitors ==
There was one competitor for Venezuela at the 1948 Olympics, 23-year-old Julio César León, who competed in two events within the sport of cycling. With resistance from the VOC, León faced challenges to get to London and compete. León's friendship with his Argentine rivals gave him some support, including allowing him to be an honorary member of the Argentine delegation so he could eat with them, as Venezuela had not organized anything and he could not buy any food due to national rationing in the UK. León was housed at Richmond Park with the Ibero-American and Scandinavian male competitors.^{:160} London 1948 was the only Olympic Games at which León competed.

Sport	Men	Women	Total
Cycling	1	0	1
Total	1	0	1

== Cycling ==
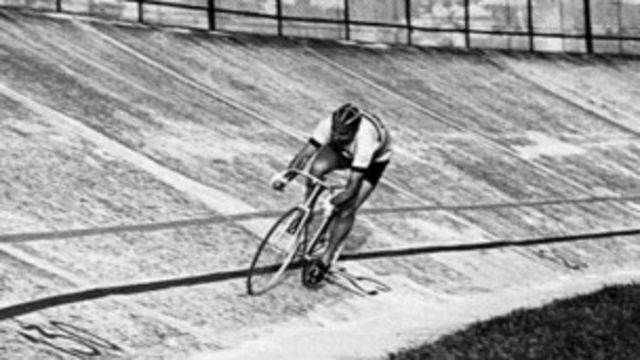
León competing

In cycling, 188 athletes of 33 countries competed in 6 events between August 7 and 11 at the Herne Hill Velodrome for track events.^{:26, 317–335}

=== Track ===
In the sprint event cyclists were drawn in heats of two; the winners would qualify, while the losing competitors contested repechage races before definitive elimination. The UCI decided to reduce the length of the race from the usual 1,000 metres to 920 metres in order to perform the competition in 2 laps. In the 1,000 metre time trial event cyclists raced individually to achieve the best time.^{:322}

Sprint

In the Men's sprint, León was in heat six of the first round, and lost. He continued to round 2 by beating Trinidad and Tobago's Compton Gonsalves in his repechage race.^{:322} In the second round, he lost again and thus was eliminated; however, his time and loss to the eventual gold medal winner resulted in León placing sixth. He was ranked joint ninth, behind four athletes tied for fifth place, out of the 23 athletes competing.

Athlete	Round 1	Repechage	Round 2	Quarterfinals	Semifinals	Final
Athlete	Opposition Result	Opposition Result	Opposition Result	Opposition Result	Opposition Result	Opposition Result
Julio César León	Cortoni (ARG); L	Gonsalves (TRI); W 12.6	Ghella (ITA); L	did not advance		

Time trial

Of his two events, León claims his "more likely" win was the 1,000 metre time trial, which he regularly rode in 1'12" to 1'13". He said the climate of London negatively affected him and caused him to underperform, placing 14th of the 21 competitors with a time of 1'18.1"; the gold medalist Jacques Dupont won with a time of 1'13.5", which León later lamented he should have beaten.

Athlete	Time	Rank
Julio César León	1:18.1	14
