= Cycling at the 1948 Summer Olympics – Men's track time trial =

Cycling at the Olympics

Cycling - Men's track time trial at the Games of the XIV Olympiad
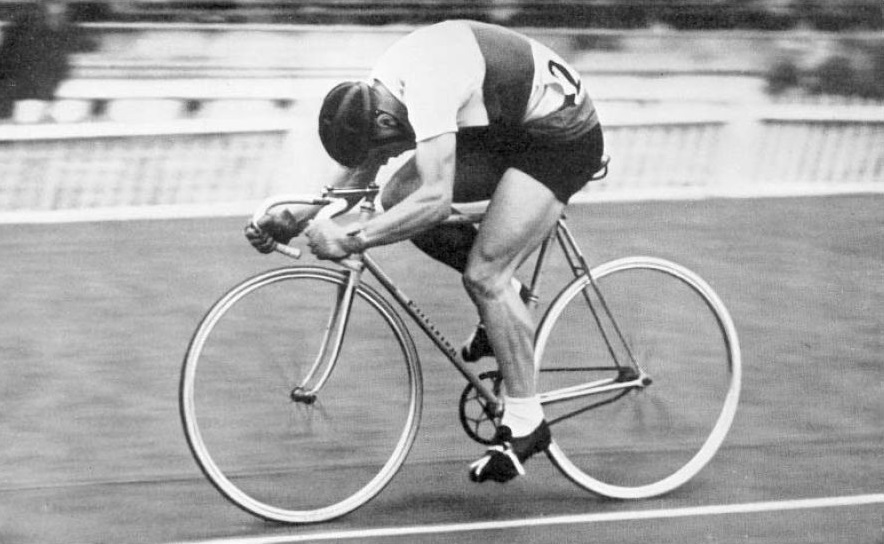
- Jacques Dupont
- Venue: Herne Hill Velodrome, London
- Date: 11 August 1948
- Competitors: 21 from 21 nations
- Winning time: 1:13.5

Medalists
1st place, gold medalist(s)		Jacques Dupont; France
2nd place, silver medalist(s)		Pierre Nihant; Belgium
3rd place, bronze medalist(s)		Tommy Godwin; Great Britain

The men's track time trial cycling event at the 1948 Summer Olympics took place on 11 August and was one of six events at the 1948 Olympics. Twenty-one cyclists from 21 nations competed, with each nation limited to one competitor. The event was won by Jacques Dupont of France, the nation's first victory in the event since 1896 and third consecutive podium appearance. Pierre Nihant earned Belgium's first medal in the men's track time trial with his silver; Tommy Godwin similarly took Great Britain's first medal in the event with his bronze.

== Background ==
This was the fifth appearance of the event, which had previously been held in 1896 and every Games since 1928. It would be held every Games until being dropped from the programme after 2004. None of the cyclists from 1936 returned. Jacques Dupont of France was the French champion and had set an unofficial world record of 1:08.6.

Cuba, Guyana, India, Pakistan, Trinidad and Tobago, Uruguay, and Venezuela each made their debut in the men's track time trial. France and Great Britain each made their fifth appearance, having competed at every appearance of the event.

== Competition format ==
The event was a time trial on the track, with each cyclist competing separately to attempt to achieve the fastest time. Each cyclist raced one kilometre from a standing start. The track's asphalt surface led to slow times.

== Records ==
The following were the world and Olympic records prior to the competition.

World record	Fabio Battesini (ITA)	1:10.0	Milan, Italy	1938
Olympic record	Arie van Vliet (NED)	1:12.0	Berlin, Germany	1 August 1936

No new world or Olympic records were set during the competition.

== Schedule ==
All times are British Summer Time (UTC+1)

Date	Time	Round
Wednesday, 11 August 1948	17:00	Final

== Results ==
Rank	Cyclist	Nation	Time
1st place, gold medalist(s)	Jacques Dupont	France	1:13.5
2nd place, silver medalist(s)	Pierre Nihant	Belgium	1:14.5
3rd place, bronze medalist(s)	Tommy Godwin	Great Britain	1:15.0
4	Hans Flückiger	Switzerland	1:15.3
5	Axel Schandorff	Denmark	1:15.5
6	Sid Patterson	Australia	1:15.7
7	Jack Heid	United States	1:16.2
8	Walter Freitag	Austria	1:16.8
9	Gino Guerra	Italy	1:17.1
10	Onni Kasslin	Finland	1:17.4
11	Carlos Tramutolo	Uruguay	1:17.5
12	Theo Blankenaauw	Netherlands	1:17.7
13	Jorge Sobrevila	Argentina	1:17.9
14	Julio César León	Venezuela	1:18.1
15	Lorne Atkinson	Canada	1:20.2
16	Compton Gonsalves	Trinidad and Tobago	1:21.5
16	Reinaldo Paseiro	Cuba	1:21.5
18	Adolfo Romero	Mexico	1:22.7
19	Rohinton Noble	India	1:22.9
20	Wazir Ali	Pakistan	1:24.8
21	Laddie Lewis	Guyana	1:25.0
