= Mario Masanés =

Chilean cyclist

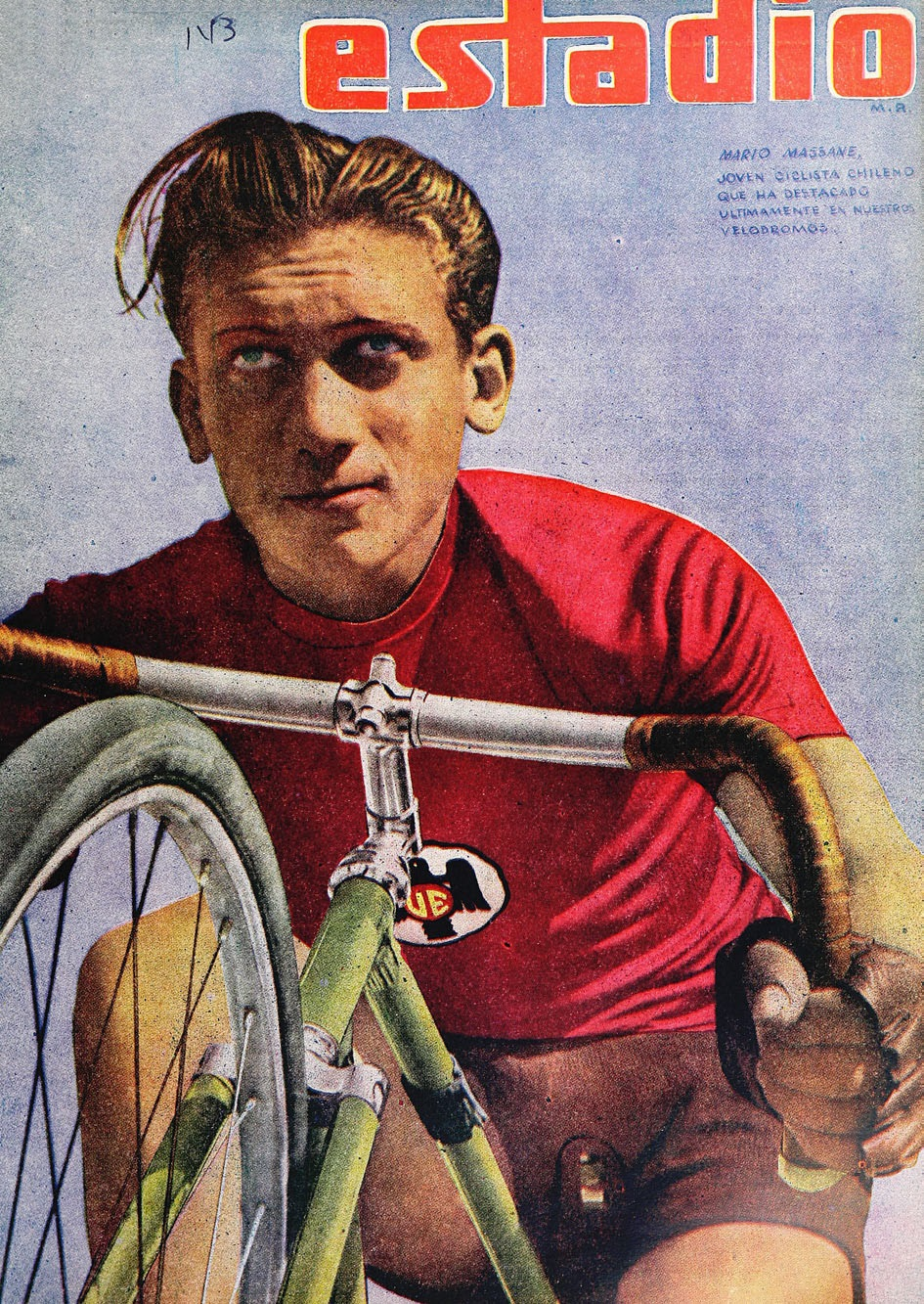
- Mario Masanés at Estadio magazine photo shoot (1946)

Personal information
- Full name: Mario Masanés Jimeno
- Born: 18 September 1927 Santiago, Chile
- Died: 1979 (aged 51–52) Chile
- Height: 171 cm (5 ft 7 in)

Cycling career
- Sport: Cycling
- Discipline: Track cycling
- Role: Rider
- Rider type: Sprinter

Amateur team
- Unión Española

Major wins
- Bronze medal, 1951 Pan American Games

Mario Masanés Jimeno (18 September 1927 – 11 Novembre 1979) was a Chilean track cyclist, best known for his performances in the sprint events during the 1940s and 1950s. He represented Chile at the 1948 Summer Olympics in London, finishing fifth in the individual sprint, a result that stood as the best Chilean Olympic cycling performance for more than 75 years.

== Biography ==
Masanés was the son of Spanish immigrants. His father, Alfredo Masanés Oleart, had been Chilean national champion with the Club Ciclista Ibérico between 1916 and 1922.

Mario himself raced for the sports club Unión Española, where he rose to prominence as a sprinter. At age 16 he won the Chilean national title in the 1000 m scratch and set a South American record in the 200 m sprint (11.9 seconds).

Together with his brother Hernán and other cycling leaders, he later helped to refound the Club Ciclista Ibérico, reviving the tradition of the team his father had belonged to, as a platform for younger riders.

== Career ==
At the 1948 Summer Olympics in London, Masanés defeated French champion Jacques Bellenger in the round of 16 before losing in the quarterfinals to Britain’s Reg Harris, eventual silver medalist. He ranked fifth overall and earned an Olympic diploma.

At the 1951 Pan American Games in Buenos Aires he won the bronze medal in the 1000 m sprint, becoming one of the first Chilean cyclists to reach the podium at that event. In 1952, alongside his brother Hernán, he was part of the winning Chilean team at the South American Championships in Montevideo. He retired from competition after racing in the “24 Hours of Montevideo” in 1955.

== Personal life ==
Masanés married Marta Susarte Bambach, with whom he had two sons: Mario Antonio and Luis Alfredo. Several relatives remained connected to cycling, including nephew Alfredo Hernán Masanés Galarce, who raced professionally in the 1980s.

== Legacy ==
Together with his brother Hernán Masanés, was popularly known as one of the “Hermanos Masanés” (“Masanés brothers”), who marked the golden era of Chilean cycling in the 1950s. His fifth place in 1948, his South American junior record, and his Pan American bronze medal established him as a reference for future generations of Chilean riders.

In July 2024, Chilean rider Macarena Pérez equaled his Olympic record by placing fifth in BMX freestyle at the 2024 Summer Olympics.
