= Jack Heid =

American cyclist

Personal information
- Full name: John Sebastian Heid
- Nickname: Yankee Clipper
- Born: June 26, 1924 New York, New York, United States
- Died: May 27, 1987 (aged 62) Bushkill, Pennsylvania, United States

Cycling career
- Sport: Cycling
- Disciplines: Track; Road
- Role: Rider

Amateur team
- Century Road Club

Jack Heid (June 26, 1924 – May 27, 1987) was an American cyclist. He competed in the time trial and the sprint events at the 1948 Summer Olympics.

In 1948, Heid moved to Europe to compete in the Summer Olympics in London. He reached the quarterfinals in the sprint and finished seventh in the 1000-meter time trial. The following year, he finished third in the amateur sprint at the UCI Track World Championships. He was coached by Jackie Simes, with whom he also competed in tandem races.

Heid was considered a pioneer of American cycling, as he was the first American cyclist to race in Europe after World War II. At first he remained an amateur and made a living selling contraband. In the early 1950s he turned professional and settled in England. At the 1950 UCI Track Cycling World Championships, he finished eighth in the sprint. That year, he married a Belgian woman and originally wanted to take Belgian citizenship. However, in 1951 he returned to the United States and competed in six-day races; in 1957 he finished third in Chicago with Mino De Rossi.

Heid and his wife resided in New Jersey, while owning a chalet in Pennsylvania. In 1987 he died in a fire in the chalet at the age of 62. In 1989, he was posthumously inducted into the United States Bicycling Hall of Fame.

Heid also competed on the road, winning the 1957 Tour of Somerville.
