= Charlie Bazzano =

Australian cyclist (1923–2014)

Personal information
- Born: 10 October 1923 Morano sul Po, Italy
- Died: 9 January 2014 (aged 90) Cronulla, New South Wales, Australia

Cycling career
- Sport: Cycling

Charlie Bazzano (10 October 1923 – 9 January 2014) was an Australian cyclist. He competed in the sprint event at the 1948 Summer Olympics. In the 1,000-metre sprint event semi-finals he finished fourth beaten by Britain's Reg Harris, who eventually took the silver medal. He also competed at the 1950 British Empire Games.

In 1971, Bazzano became the NSW cycling coach.

== Private life ==
Bazzano was born in Morano sul Po in Northern Italy. He had one brother, Leo. They and father Jack arrived in Australia when Charlie was aged three. His nephew Matt Bazzano became a notable cyclist and later Managing Director of Shimano Australia Cycling. Charlie was married to Heather who died several years before him. He used a wheelchair for some years before dying of a heart attack in Cronulla, New South Wales.
