= Republic of China at the 1948 Summer Olympics =

- Flag of the Republic of China
- IOC code: ROC (CHN used at these Games)
- NOC: Chinese Olympic Committee (Note: See Chinese Olympic Committee#Timeline concerning Olympic recognition and Chinese Taipei Olympic Committee#History.)

in London
- Competitors: 31 (30 men, 1 woman) in 6 sports
- Flag bearer: Wee Tian Siak
- Medals: Gold 0 Silver 0 Bronze 0 Total 0

Summer Olympics appearances (overview)
- 1924; 1928; 1932; 1936; 1948

Other related appearances
- China (1952–pres.); Chinese Taipei (1956–pres.)

China, as the Republic of China, competed at the 1948 Summer Olympics in London, England, United Kingdom. 31 competitors, 30 men and 1 woman, took part in 11 events in 6 sports.

== Athletics ==
Track&Road events

Athlete	Event	Heat		Quarterfinal		Semifinal		Final	
Athlete	Event	Result	Rank	Result	Rank	Result	Rank	Result	Rank
Chen Yinglang	Men's 400 m	50.9	3	Did Not Advance					
Lou Wen-ngau	Men's 5000 m		8	—N/a				Did Not Advance	
Lou Wen-ngau	Men's 10000 m	—N/a						32:56.0	17
Lou Wen-ngau	Men's Marathon	—N/a						DNF	
Ng Liang Chiang	Men's 400m hurdles	57.7	4	—N/a		Did Not Advance			

== Basketball ==
=== Group B ===
Team	Pld	W	L	PF	PA	PD	Pts
South Korea	5	3	2	258	152	+106	8
Chile	5	3	2	269	162	+107	8
Belgium	5	3	2	234	156	+78	8
Republic of China	5	3	2	281	202	+79	8
Philippines	5	3	2	261	200	+61	8
Iraq	5	0	5	113	545	−432	5

(Taiwan) China 39–44 Chile
(Taiwan) China 36–34 Belgium
(Taiwan) China 49–48 South Korea
(Taiwan) China 32–51 Philippines
(Taiwan) China 125–25 Iraq

=== Classification round ===
==== 17–23 ====
(Taiwan) China 42–34 Switzerland

==== 17–20 ====
(Taiwan) China 54–25 Great Britain

==== 17–18 ====
(Taiwan) China 38–54 Italy

== Cycling ==
One male cyclist represented China in 1948.

Athlete	Event	Round 1	Round 1 Repechage	Round 2	Quarter Finals	Semi Finals	Finals	Final
Athlete	Event	Opposition Result	Opposition Result	Opposition Result	Opposition Result	Opposition Result	Opposition Result	Rank
Howard Wing	Men's sprint	Emile Van De Velde (BEL); L	did not advance					

== Football ==
=== First round ===
2 August 1948
18:30

Turkey	4–0	China
Kılıç 18', 61'; Saygun 72'; Küçükandonyadis 87'	Report

Green Pond Road, Walthamstow
Attendance: 3,000
Referee: Johann Beck (Austria)

== Swimming ==
Men

Athlete	Event	Heat		Semifinal		Final	
Athlete	Event	Result	Rank	Result	Rank	Result	Rank
Wu Chuanyu	100m freestyle	1:03.5	5	Did Not Advance			
