= Howard Wing =

Chinese cyclist (1916–2008)

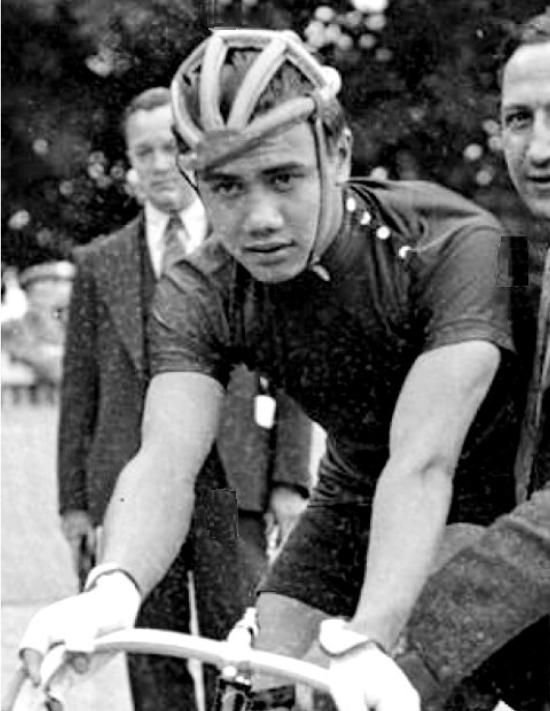
- Wing in 1936

Personal information
- Full name: Howard Wing
- Born: 28 January 1916 Amsterdam, Netherlands
- Died: 7 March 2008 (aged 92) Niagara Falls, Ontario, Canada

Cycling career
- Sport: Cycling
- Discipline: Track
- Role: Rider
- Rider type: Sprinter

Professional team
- (1930–c. 1948): Feyenoord

Howard Wing (Chinese: 何浩華; pinyin: Hé Hàohuá; 28 January 1916 – 7 March 2008) was a Dutch and Chinese cyclist and businessman. He became the first cyclist to compete internationally for China after he competed at the 1936 Summer Olympics.

Born in Amsterdam, the Netherlands to an Irish mother and a Chinese father, Wing grew up in Rotterdam and cycled frequently when he was young. He joined Feyenoord's cycling club as a teenager and won multiple of the club's championships. He trained with the Dutch national team, though he had to leave as he did not possess a Dutch passport at the time. The Dutch Olympic Committee contacted the Chinese ambassador as the China National Amateur Athletic Federation was looking for European-based Chinese athletes to compete at the 1936 Summer Olympics. He was China's biggest medal hope at the 1936 Games, though he lost all of his rounds.

Wing subsequently competed at eight world championships and the 1948 Summer Olympics for China, though he injured himself at the latter, thus ending his career. Outside of sport, he owned a business specializing in store displays and moved to Canada with his wife in 1956. There, he retired and resided in Niagara Falls until his death.

== Early life ==
Howard Wing was born on 28 January 1916 to an Irish mother and a Chinese father in Amsterdam, Netherlands. He grew up in Rotterdam as his father Ernest Wing was stationed in the city as a contractor for sailors. Howard recalled that the Chinese community in Rotterdam when he was young struggled financially and most sold peanuts along the streets; he was called pinda (lit. 'peanut') by locals, which made him angry. He cycled frequently when he was young because of the cycling culture of the Netherlands.

== Career ==
He started competitive cycling after he bought a second-hand bicycle from a friend. As a teenager, he joined the cycling club of Feyenoord, the first cycling club in the southern portion of the Netherlands. He soon switched from road to track cycling due to his speed, whereas he contrasted himself with his teammate Arie van Vliet, who rode with "power" while he rode with "flexibility". They were coached by Guus Schilling at the Rijswijk cycling track. As a member of the club, he won the club's championship for seventeen years straight.

During his career, he started training with the Dutch national team. He had to part ways with the team after the team found out that Wing did not possess a Dutch passport, and therefore could not represent the Netherlands at the Olympics. The Dutch Olympic Committee contacted the ambassador of China to the Netherlands. At the time, the China National Amateur Athletic Federation was looking for Europe-based Chinese athletes to compete for the nation at the 1936 Summer Olympics in Berlin, Germany. He had never visited China before and would not do so until some years after.

Going into the 1936 Summer Olympics, Wing was the Chinese team's highest medal hope and would be the first cyclist to represent China in international competition. He competed in the men's sprint event, where he lost against Benedetto Pola of Italy in the first round by three-fourths of a length. Wing was relegated to a repechage round against Doug Peace of Canada and lost by a wide margin, thus ending his Olympic run. In the same month, he competed at an international competition at the Herne Hill Velodrome and had to be hospitalised after he dislocated his hip during a time trial race.

After the 1936 Summer Games, he participated in eight world championships for China. His second Olympic Games were the 1948 Summer Olympics, where he took part in the men's sprint event, in London, United Kingdom. In his opening round against Ward Van de Velde of Belgium, Wing lost by a few lengths, then crashed his bicycle. He had to be sent to the hospital after falling unconscious with an injured shoulder, a broken collarbone, and lacerations on his arm and leg. This was the last competition he participated in. He was replaced by Manthos Kaloudis of Greece at the repechage after withdrawing.

== Personal life and later years ==
Alongside his cycling career, Wing worked and owned a business that specialized in store displays and almost closed down during World War II. He emigrated to Canada in 1956 with his wife Catharina de Krijger, with whom he had a son, and set up business there. Wing resided in a retirement home at Niagara Falls, Canada, until his death on 7 March 2008, with his wife dying the year before.
