= Matteoli =

Matteoli is a surname. Notable people with the surname include:

- Altero Matteoli (1940–2017), Italian politician
- Emilia Matteoli (born 1999), Italian cyclist
- Gianfranco Matteoli (born 1959), Italian footballer
- Jean Mattéoli (1922–2008), French politician
- Paul Matteoli (1929–1988), French cyclist
