= Hans Flückiger =

Swiss cyclist

Personal information
- Born: 12 January 1926 Zürich, Switzerland

Cycling career
- Sport: Cycling

Hans Flückiger (born 12 January 1926) is a Swiss former cyclist. He competed in the time trial event at the 1948 Summer Olympics.
