= Adolfo Romero =

Mexican cyclist

Personal information
- Full name: Adolfo Romero Quiñones
- Born: 4 December 1922
- Died: before 1999

Cycling career
- Sport: Cycling

Adolfo Romero Quiñones (4 December 1922 – before 1999) was a Mexican cyclist. He competed in the time trial and the sprint events at the 1948 Summer Olympics.
