= Julio César León =

Venezuelan cyclist (1925–2025)

Julio César León OLY
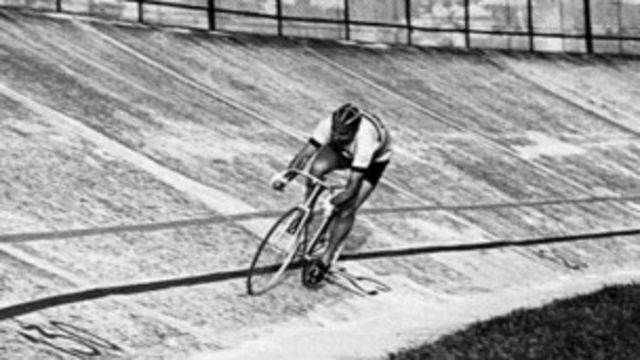
- León at the 1948 Olympics

Personal information
- Full name: Julio César León Aranguren
- Born: 2 February 1925 Trujillo, Venezuela
- Died: 17 August 2025 (aged 100) Caracas, Venezuela

Cycling career
- Sport: Cycling

Julio César León Aranguren (2 February 1925 – 17 August 2025) was a Venezuelan cyclist who competed at the 1948 Summer Olympics in London. He was the first sportsperson from Venezuela to take part in the Olympic Games.

== Early and personal life ==
Julio César León Aranguren was born on 2 February 1925 in Trujillo, Trujillo state, Venezuela. He began cycling at the age of four, often exploring the towns of his birth state and becoming a local cycling champion by age fifteen. He moved to the capital Caracas when his elder brother, Francisco José, started medical studies at the Central University of Venezuela (UCV): Julio César León travelled the whole distance by bike, a four-day trip in June 1942. He then became a cycling champion in Caracas, where they competed on an improvised velodrome of two connected avenues, before using this experience to begin road racing.

León graduated in engineering graduate from UCV. The Venezuelan Ministry of Sports' national weight training gym is named for him and, to celebrate his 100th birthday in 2025, the Venezuelan Olympic Committee created the Order of Julio César León, honouring six Venezuelan cyclists with international honours.

His wife was called Carmen Elisa. He died at his home in Caracas, on 17 August 2025, at the age of 100.

== Career ==
In the early and mid 1940s, León competed in national Venezuelan competitions and internationally in Latin America, becoming a renowned sprint cyclist. A long distance race won in Trinidad and Tobago in 1945 gave León an international profile and a resulting boost in support from Venezuela's cycling federation. At the Cycling World Championships in France in 1947, León qualified for the top eight in the sprint with a time of 10.9 seconds. At the 1948 Summer Olympics, he was eliminated in the second round of the sprint, being beaten by the eventual gold medalist, Italian Mario Ghella. In the Olympic 1000 metres time trial he finished 14th with a time of 1:18.1. After the Olympics he joined the Italian team Bianchi. He once cycled from Caracas to Maracay in two hours and forty minutes. He broke the record for Team Pursuit with his teammate Domingo Rivas y Montilla in the Teo Capriles Velodrome at the National Institute of Sport with a time of 4 minutes, 40 seconds in the 4,000 m event at a rate of 1 minute and 10 seconds per kilometer. Julio César was a Bolivarian, Central American, and Pan-American champion on two occasions and was also a champion in Chile, Argentina, and Uruguay.

In 1959, Caracas hosted the Central American and Caribbean Games for the first time, and León went on to win the gold medal in the 1 km track event and the silver medal in the track sprint.

== See also ==
- Venezuela at the 1948 Summer Olympics
