= Carlos Tramutolo =

Uruguayan cyclist

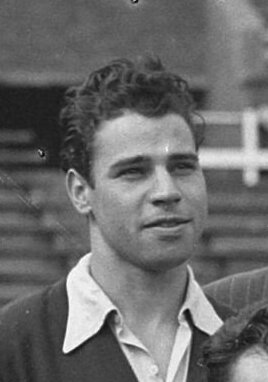
- Tramútolo in 1948

Personal information
- Born: 17 March 1925 Montevideo, Uruguay
- Died: 9 July 2013 (aged 88) Minas, Uruguay

Cycling career
- Sport: Cycling

Carlos Tramutolo (17 March 1925 – 9 July 2013) was a Uruguayan cyclist. He competed in the time trial event at the 1948 Summer Olympics.
