= Pierre Nihant =

Belgian cyclist (1925–1993)

Personal information
- Born: 5 April 1925 Trembleur, Belgium
- Died: 12 January 1993 (aged 67) Blegny, Belgium

Cycling career
- Sport: Cycling
Medal record
Men's cycling
Representing Belgium
Olympic Games
Silver medal – second place	1948 London	1000m time trial

Pierre Nihant (5 April 1925 – 12 January 1993) was a Belgian cyclist. He was born in Trembleur (part of Blegny), in the province of Liège. He won a silver medal in the 1000m time trial at the 1948 Summer Olympics in London.
