= Wazir Ali (cyclist) =

Pakistani cyclist (1928–1999)

Personal information
- Born: 15 February 1928 Jalandar, Punjab, British India
- Died: 20 December 1999 Lahore, Pakistan

Cycling career
- Sport: Cycling

Wazir Ali (born 15 February 1928 – 20 December 1999) was a Pakistani cyclist. He competed in the individual road race and the time trial events at the 1948 Summer Olympics.
