= Leonel Rocca =

Uruguayan cyclist

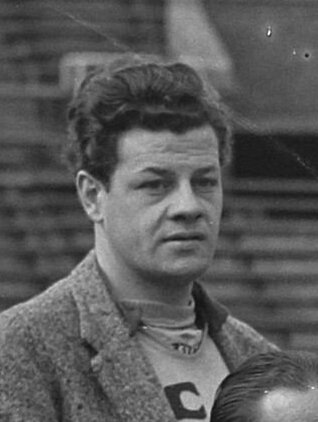
- Rocca in 1948

Personal information
- Born: 21 January 1915 Mercedes, Uruguay
- Died: 19 June 1965 (aged 50)

Cycling career
- Sport: Cycling

Leonel Rocca (21 January 1915 – 19 June 1965) was a Uruguayan cyclist. He competed in the sprint event at the 1948 Summer Olympics.
