= Julio Leon =

Julio Leon may refer to:

- Julio César de León (born 1979), Honduran footballer
- Julio León Heredia (born 1966), Venezuelan politician, governor of Yaracuy
- Julio César León (1925–2025), Venezuelan cyclist
