= Bob Lacourse =

Canadian cyclist

Personal information
- Full name: Joseph Gustave Robert Lacourse
- Born: 14 December 1926 Montreal, Quebec, Canada
- Died: 31 January 2013 (aged 86) Saint-Jérôme, Quebec, Canada

Cycling career
- Sport: Cycling

Bob Lacourse (14 December 1926 – 31 January 2013) was a Canadian cyclist. He competed in the sprint event at the 1948 Summer Olympics.
