= Gino Guerra =

Italian cyclist

Personal information
- Born: 16 October 1924 Mantua, Italy
- Died: 28 December 1978 (aged 54) Kroonstad, South Africa

Cycling career
- Sport: Cycling

Gino Guerra (16 October 1924 – 28 December 1978) was an Italian cyclist. He competed in the time trial event at the 1948 Summer Olympics.
