= 1950 UCI Track Cycling World Championships =

- Venue: Rocourt, Belgium
- Date: August 1950
- Velodrome: Stade Vélodrome de Rocourt
- Events: 5

The 1950 UCI Track Cycling World Championships were the World Championship for track cycling. They took place in Rocourt, Belgium in 1950. Five events for men were contested, three for professionals and two for amateurs.

In the same period, the 1950 UCI Road World Championships was organized in Moorslede, Belgium.

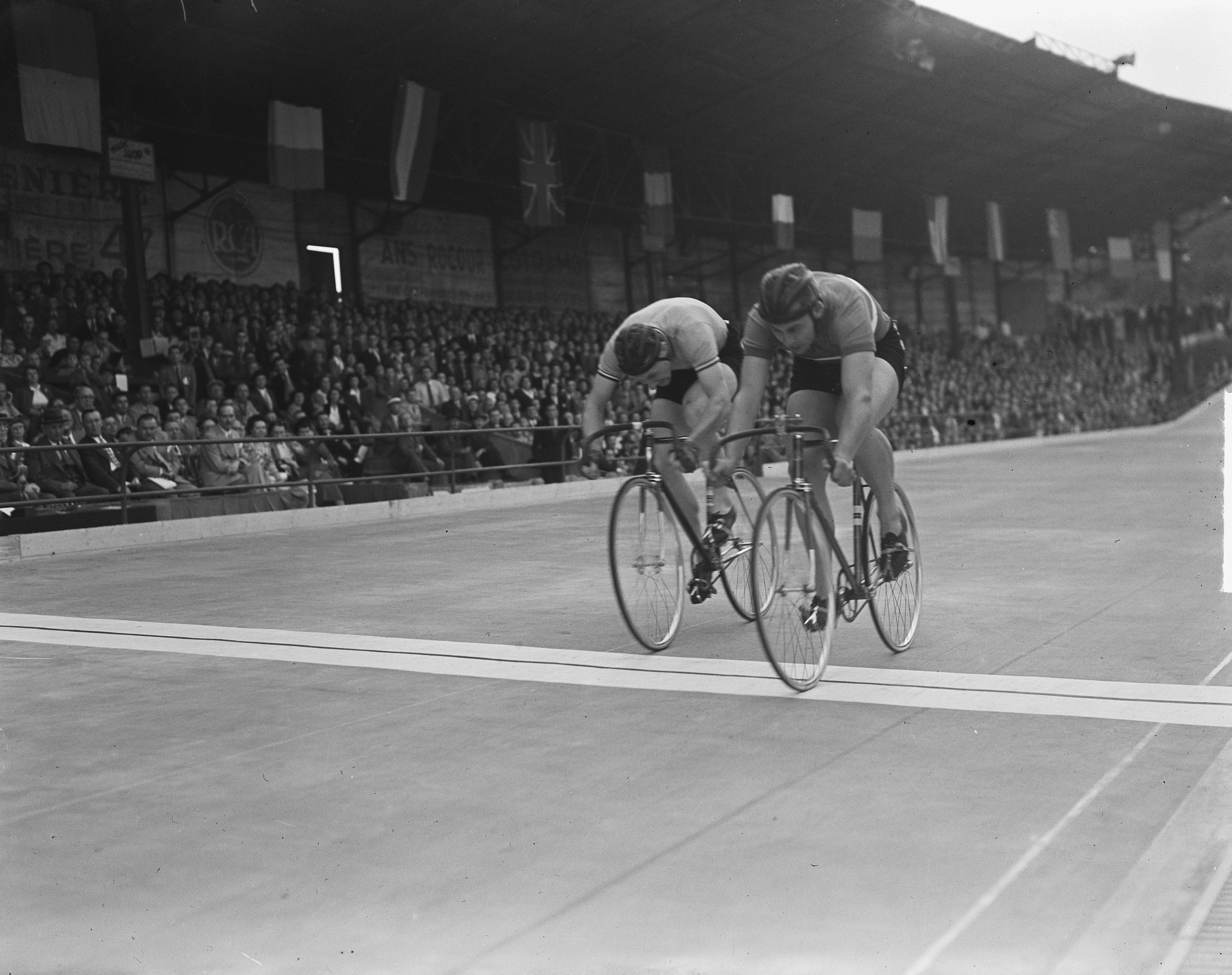
Jan Hijzelendoorn (left) finishes behind Pierre Even in the men's amateur sprint

== Medal summary ==
Event	Gold	Silver	Bronze
Men's Professional Events
Men's sprint	Reg Harris; Great Britain	Arie van Vliet; Netherlands	Jan Derksen; Netherlands
Men's individual pursuit	Antonio Bevilacqua; Italy	Wim van Est; Netherlands	Paul Matteoli; France
Men's motor-paced	Raoul Lesueur; France	Jan Pronk; Netherlands	Georges Sérès junior France
Men's Amateur Events
Men's sprint	Maurice Verdeun; France	Pierre Even; France	Johannes Hijzelendoorn; Netherlands
Men's individual pursuit	Sid Patterson; Australia	Aldo Gandini; Italy	Guido Messina; Italy

== Medal table ==
Rank	Nation	Gold	Silver	Bronze	Total
1	France (FRA)	2	1	2	5
2	Italy (ITA)	1	1	1	3
3	Australia (AUS)	1	0	0	1
3	Great Britain (GBR)	1	0	0	1
5	Netherlands (NED)	0	3	2	5
Totals (5 entries)		5	5	5	15

== See also ==
- 1950 UCI Road World Championships
