= Reg Harris =

English cyclist (1920–1992)

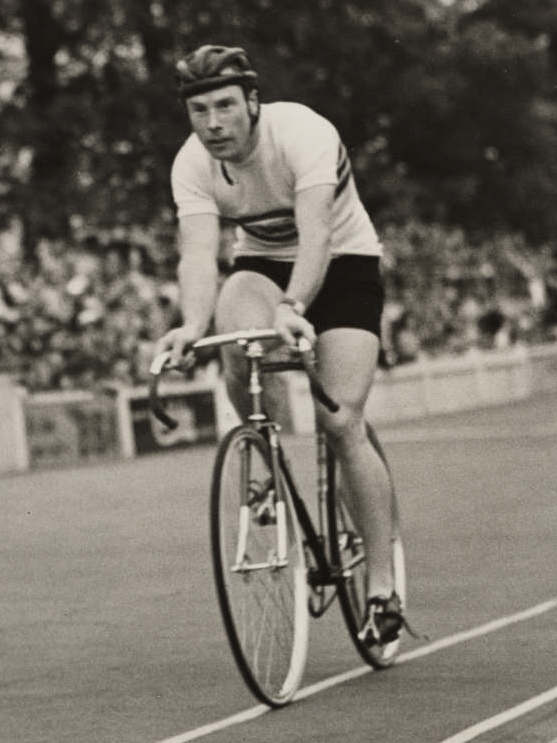
- Harris at the 1948 Olympic Games

Personal information
- Full name: Reginald Hargreaves Harris
- Born: 1 March 1920 Birtle, Bury, Lancashire, England
- Died: 22 June 1992 (aged 72) Macclesfield, Cheshire, England

Cycling career
- Sport: Cycling
- Discipline: Track
- Role: Rider

Amateur teams
- 1934: Cyclists' Touring Club
- –: Lancashire Road Club
- –: Manchester Wheelers' Club

Professional teams
- 1952–1955: Raleigh Cycles-Dunlop
- 1957: Raleigh Cycles-Dunlop
- 1971: TI-Carlton
- 1972: Falcon-Tighe
- 1975: Draka Foam
Medal record
Men's track cycling
Representing Great Britain
Olympic Games
Silver medal – second place	1948 London	Sprint
Silver medal – second place	1948 London	Tandem
World Championships
Gold medal – first place	1949 Copenhagen	Sprint
Gold medal – first place	1950 Rocourt	Sprint
Gold medal – first place	1951 Milan	Sprint
Gold medal – first place	1954 Cologne	Sprint
Silver medal – second place	1956 Copenhagen	Sprint
Bronze medal – third place	1953 Zürich	Sprint

Reginald Hargreaves Harris OBE (1 March 1920 – 22 June 1992) was an English track racing cyclist in the 1940s and 1950s. He won the world amateur sprint title in 1947, two Olympic silver medals in 1948 and the world professional title in 1949, 1950, 1951 and 1954. His ferocious will to win made him a household name in the 1950s, but he also surprised many with a comeback more than 20 years later, winning a British title in 1974 at the age of 54.

== Early life ==
Harris was born as Reginald Hargreaves at 7 Garden Street, Birtle, Bury, Lancashire. His mother, Elsie Hargreaves, a cotton weaver, remarried and Reginald took the name of his stepfather, an engineer and businessman called Joseph Harris.

Reg Harris left school without qualifications and his first job was as an apprentice motor mechanic in Bury, soon moving from the workshop to the salesroom. During this period, at the age of 14, he bought his first bicycle, and entered a roller-racing competition organised by the Hercules bicycle manufacturing company.

== Amateur career and military service ==
His ability attracted the attention of other cyclists and Harris joined the Bury section of the Cyclists' Touring Club and then its racing offshoot, the Lancashire Road Club. In 1935, he won his first race, a half-mile handicap event held on a grass track in Bury, and also started competing in individual time trials.

Harris moved from the motor mechanics job to a slipper factory, then, in early 1936, to a paper mill which he felt would pay him enough in the winter to spend the summer training and competing. During 1936, he raced on grass tracks in Lincolnshire, then competed in and won his first events in conventional competition at Fallowfield Stadium in Fallowfield, Manchester.

In early 1937, he was confident he could support himself as an athlete, selling the prizes he won as an amateur, and left the paper mill to focus on the summer cycle racing season, returning to the mill the following winter (repeating the process the following year). He continued to win races and attract attention, and by the summer of 1938 was able to beat the existing British sprint champion. At the end of that season, he joined Manchester Wheelers' Club, and in 1939 won a major race in Coventry, leading to his selection for the world championship in Milan, Italy. He travelled to Milan and had familiarised himself with the Velodromo Vigorelli when World War II broke out and the British team was recalled to the UK.

Harris joined the 10th Hussars in the North African campaign as a tank driver but was wounded, transferred to the Royal Army Service Corps, and later invalided out of the services as medically unfit in 1943. He liked to joke that he was one of the few men to leave the army less fit than when he joined. Despite the judgment of the army medics, in 1944, he won the 1,000 yards (910 m), quarter-mile and five-mile (8 km) national cycling championships. He retained the two shorter titles in 1945 and added the half-mile on grass. He was invited to race in Paris in 1945 and again impressed the crowds, and he was expected to do well in the 1946 world championships in Zürich, Switzerland, only to have his chances ruined by an over-enthusiastic pre-race massage. Harris's amateur world championship achievements were celebrated in 1947 when Cycling Weekly awarded him his own page in the Golden Book of Cycling.

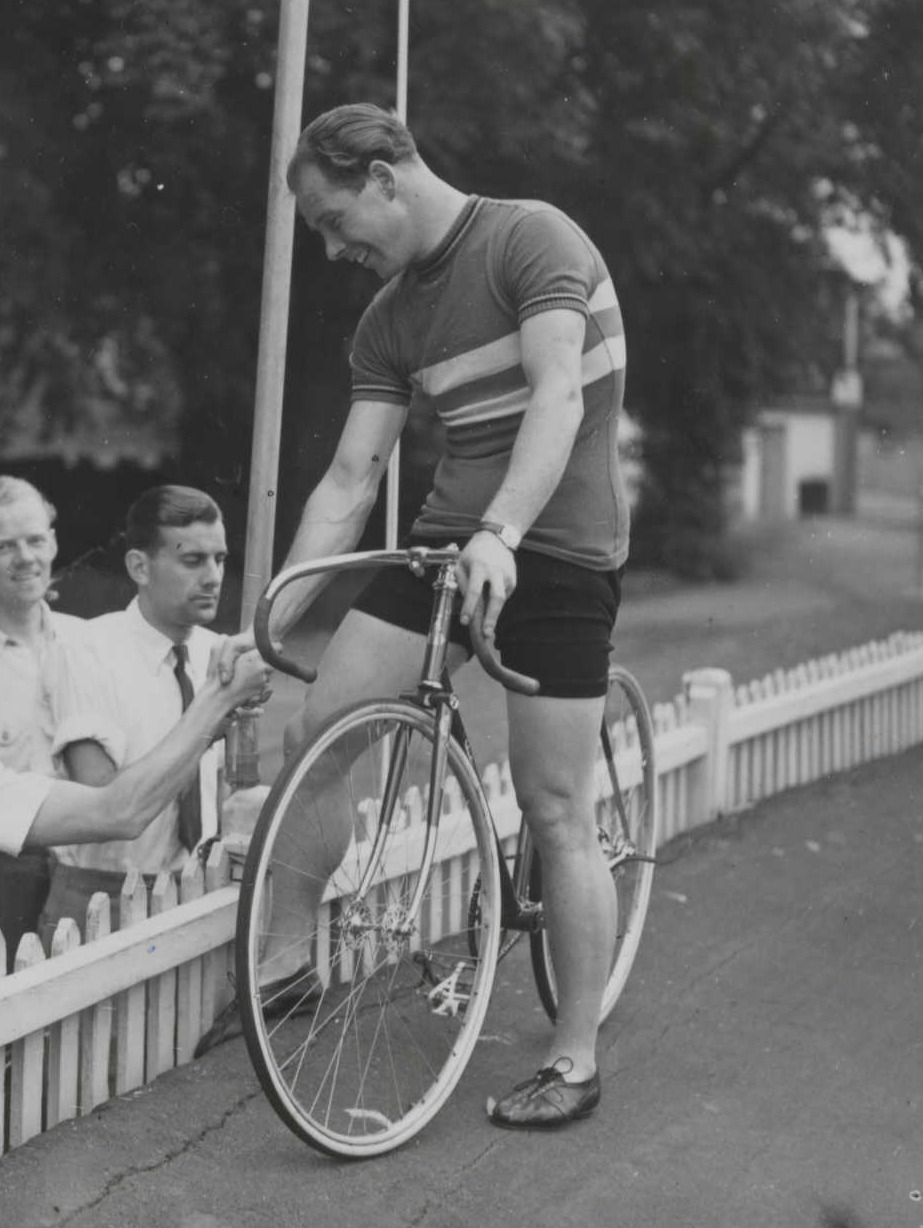
Harris at the Herne Hill Velodrome during the 1948 Olympic Games

By the time Harris won the world amateur sprint title in Paris in 1947, he was already employed and equipped by bicycle manufacturer Claud Butler and was testing the boundaries of amateurism. The cycling world expected that Harris would take three titles in the 1948 Summer Olympics: the sprint, the tandem sprint and the kilometre time trial, but three months before the London Games, he broke two ribs in a road accident. After hospital, with a few weeks remaining to the games, training, competing and winning, he fell in a ten-mile (16 km) race at Fallowfield and fractured an elbow. Completing the rest of his preparation in a plaster cast, he had to be satisfied with two silvers, being beaten by Italy's Mario Ghella in the final of the sprint, and partnering Alan Bannister to second place in the tandem sprint (timetable constraints meant Harris's place in the kilometre was taken by another rider, Tommy Godwin, who won a bronze medal). Two weeks later, he claimed a bronze medal in the 1948 world championships sprint in Amsterdam. He was named sportsman of the year by a poll in 1949, winning by 7,000 votes over the football player, Billy Liddell.

== Professional career ==
On his return from Amsterdam, Harris turned professional under sponsorship of the Raleigh bicycle company. He was paid £1 000 a year with a bonus of £100 if he won a world championship, £50 for every grand prix and £25 for every British record. Harris was aware of his commercial attraction to race promoters and even as an amateur drove a Jaguar Mark IV. His earnings in the 1950s have been put at £12 000 a year. He dominated Raleigh's advertising for a decade and, despite coming from a sport with no great following in Britain, he was as familiar as Stanley Matthews and Stirling Moss.

In 1949 he won the world professional sprint championship in Copenhagen – a victory he repeated the following two years in Belgium and Milan. He then won a fourth and final world professional title at the 1954 UCI Track World Championships in Cologne. He won the Sports Journalists' Association's accolade of Sportsman of the Year in 1950, and was runner-up in 1949 and 1951.

He retired in 1957 to devote himself to business interests, none of which suited his tastes or abilities. He managed Fallowfield Stadium, renamed the Harris Stadium; he was involved in various abortive ventures associated with Raleigh; and he started a 'Reg Harris' bicycle manufacturing business in Macclesfield which lasted three years before folding. He then worked in sales promotion for the 'Gannex' raincoat company, before working for two plastic foam producers. In the 1960s he owned and managed the Reg Harris Petrol & Motor Service Station on Wilmslow Road in Didsbury, Manchester, which is now the site of the Shell Petrol Station on the corner of Grange Road.

In 1971, he returned to racing, winning a bronze medal in the British championship in Birmingham after little preparation. With more training behind him, he approached the British championship in Leicester in 1974 in more confident mood, and beat Trevor Bull to win the title at the age of 54. As a reason for his return he stated that 'I wanted to prove to myself that I could win my first national professional title. Back in my days, there were no championships for pro cyclists.' In 1975, he returned to Leicester, but was narrowly beaten by Bull in the final and had to settle for the silver medal. He continued to cycle almost to his death.

== Legacy ==
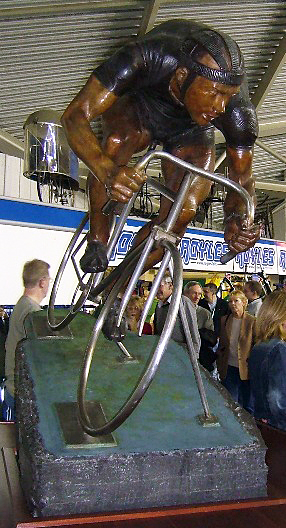
J. Jackson's Reg Harris memorial at Manchester Velodrome

A memorial to his achievements can be found in the National Cycling Centre in Manchester.

Harris's achievements are marked annually with the Reg Harris Sportive, organised by his family and friends. The inaugural event on 25 August 2013 raised money for charities.

In popular culture, Harris is referenced in the Hancock's Half Hour episode 'The Junkman'.

== Personal life ==
He was married three times. The first two marriages (in 1944 to Florence Stage (daughter of the former Bury F.C. captain Billy Stage), then to Dorothy Hadfield) ended in divorce. He married Jennifer Anne Geary in 1970. He died in Macclesfield, Cheshire, of a stroke, survived by his third wife, and was buried at St John's Church in the north Cheshire village of Chelford.

== Career achievements ==
=== Major results ===
1939
1st Sprint, Vi-Tonica Gold Cup

1944
National Track Championships

1st Sprint (Amateur)
1st 5-mile (Amateur)

1945
1st Sprint (Amateur), National Track Championships

1946
1st Sprint, Muratti Gold Cup
1st Sprint, Vi-Tonica Gold Cup
1st Sprint (Amateur), National Track Championships

1947
1st Sprint (Amateur), Track World Championships
National Track Championships

1st Sprint (Amateur)
1st Tandem sprint (Amateur)

1948
1st Tandem sprint (Amateur), National Track Championships
Olympic Games

2nd Sprint
2nd Tandem sprint (with Alan Bannister)

3rd Sprint (Amateur), Track World Championships

1949
1st Sprint, Track World Championships

1950
1st Sprint, Track World Championships

1951
1st Sprint, Track World Championships

1953
3rd Sprint, Track World Championships

1954
1st Sprint, Track World Championships

1956
2nd Sprint, Track World Championships

1974
1st Sprint, National Track Championships

=== Grand Prix ===
Grand Prix Paris 1946, 1951, 1956

Grand Prix Copenhagen 1949 and 1954 to 1957,

Grand Prix Aarhus 1956,

Grand Prix Antwerp 1950,

Grand Prix Brussels 1954 and 1955,

Grand Prix London 1955 and 1957

Grand Prix Amsterdam 1950, 1952 and 1956

=== World records ===
Discipline	Record	Date	Velodrome	Track
1 km time trial	1:09.80	23 October 1949	Vigorelli (Milan)	Open air
1 km time trial	1:08.60	26 October 1952	Vigorelli (Milan)	Open air
1 km time trial	1:09	9 November 1952	D'Hiver (Paris)	Indoor
1 km time trial	1:08.90	12 February 1955	Westfalenhallen (Dortmund)	Indoor
1 km time trial	1:08	19 July 1957	Hallenstadion (Zürich)	Indoor

=== Awards and honours ===
- Bidlake Memorial Prize: 1947, 1949
- Daily Record Sportsman of the Year: 1949
- Sports Journalists' Association Sportsman of the Year: 1950
- Order of the British Empire: 1958

== See also ==
- List of 1948 Summer Olympics medal winners
- List of British cyclists
- List of Olympic medalists in cycling (men)
- List of people from Bury
