= Swedish gymnastics at the 1948 Summer Olympics =

Swedish (Ling) gymnastics was featured in the Summer Olympic Games demonstration programme in 1948. The discipline was created by Pehr Henrik Ling in the 19th century, and involved free-standing movements in formation.

Two demonstrations were given by the Svenska Gymnastikforbundet, with 200 male and 200 female gymnasts. No medals were awarded.
