= 1949 UCI Track Cycling World Championships =

- Venue: Copenhagen, Denmark
- Date: 22–28 August 1949
- Velodrome: Ordrupbanen
- Events: 5

The 1949 UCI Track Cycling World Championships were the World Championship for track cycling. They took place in Copenhagen, Denmark from 22 to 28 August 1949. Five events for men were contested, 3 for professionals and 2 for amateurs.

== Medal summary ==
Event	Gold	Silver	Bronze
Men's Professional Events
Men's sprint	Reg Harris; Great Britain	Jan Derksen; Netherlands	Arie van Vliet; Netherlands
Men's individual pursuit	Fausto Coppi; Italy	Lucien Gillen; Luxembourg	Wim van Est; Netherlands
Men's motor-paced	Elio Frosio; Italy	Jan Pronk; Netherlands	Raoul Lesueur; France
Men's Amateur Events
Men's sprint	Sid Patterson; Australia	Jacques Bellenger; France	Jack Heid; United States
Men's individual pursuit	Knud Andersen; Denmark	Cyril Cartwright; Great Britain	Aldo Gandini; Italy

== Medal table ==
Rank	Nation	Gold	Silver	Bronze	Total
1	Italy (ITA)	2	0	1	3
2	Great Britain (GBR)	1	1	0	2
3	Australia (AUS)	1	0	0	1
3	Denmark (DEN)	1	0	0	1
5	Netherlands (NED)	0	2	2	4
6	France (FRA)	0	1	1	2
7	Luxembourg (LUX)	0	1	0	1
8	United States (USA)	0	0	1	1
Totals (8 entries)		5	5	5	15

== See also ==
- 1949 UCI Road World Championships
