= Carlton Cycles =

English bicycle manufacturer

- Traded as: Carlton Cycles Ltd.
- Industry: Bicycle manufacture
- Founded: 1898
- Founder: Fred Hanstock
- Defunct: 1981
- Headquarters: Worksop, Nottinghamshire, England
- Area served: Worldwide
- Owner: Raleigh

Carlton Cycles was a bicycle manufacturer based in Worksop, Nottinghamshire, England.

== History ==
In 1898, Fred Hanstock founded Carlton Cycles in the Nottinghamshire village of Carlton-in-Lindrick. The company relocated to nearby Worksop in 1934.

Carlton Cycle's greatest growth came from Dan O’Donovan. O’Donovan had been working in the motorcycle industry when he wandered by the Carlton booth at a trade show in 1937 and asked for a job. Carlton Cycles needed a salesman and he joined on the spot. O’Donovan turned out to be a marketing marvel and within a short while the dealer network he established was among the largest in the cycling industry. This led to an increase in demand for the company's products and the Carlton Cycles factory expanding as a result. In 1939, Dan O’Donovan took over the company. His son Gerald O'Donovan joined Carlton in 1958.

The Raleigh Bicycle Company bought the company in 1960. From 1960 to 1970, many UK brands were absorbed by Raleigh and production was transferred to Worksop, including, Armstrong, BSA, Hercules, Humber, Phillips, Robin Hood, Rudge, Sun, and Triumph. Carlton, which had been unable to make inroads in the USA market after a failed rebranding deal with Huffy, found success in the late 1960s by recasting itself as "Raleigh-Carlton", a Raleigh-head-badged bike with some Carlton badging, and using the US dealer network to import and distribute bikes. In May 1981, the workers at the Worksop factory voted for closure (though they subsequently changed their mind and were ignored) and production was moved to a new Lightweights facility at Nottingham. A Carlton Kermesse model was reintroduced briefly, in 1985, manufactured in Nottingham, and then the brand was retired for good.

== Products ==
The Carlton Flyer was Carlton's flagship bicycle frame from its introduction in 1935 to the 1970s. Its distinctive frame geometry featured steep angles and a small fork rake, and became popular and as a track and time trial bicycle. It was on this frame that Cyril Cartwright won a silver medal in the individual pursuit at the 1949 World Championships and Tom Simpson won a bronze medal in the team pursuit at the 1956 Olympics.
