= Muhammad Naqi Mallick =

Pakistani cyclist (born 1928)

Personal information
- Born: 12 July 1928

Cycling career
- Sport: Cycling

Muhammad Naqi Mallick (born 12 July 1928) is a Pakistani former cyclist. He competed at the 1948, 1952 and 1956 Summer Olympics.
