= Axel Schandorff =

Danish cyclist (1925–2016)

Personal information
- Full name: Axel Carl Schandorff
- Born: 3 March 1925 Copenhagen, Denmark
- Died: 28 January 2016 (aged 90) Copenhagen, Denmark

Cycling career
- Sport: Cycling
Medal record
Men's cycling
Representing DEN
Olympic Games
Bronze medal – third place	1948 London	Sprint

Axel Schandorff (3 March 1925 – 28 January 2016) was a Danish track cyclist. He was born in Copenhagen. He competed for Denmark at the 1948 Summer Olympics held in London, United Kingdom in the individual sprint event where he finished in the bronze medal position.

His daughter, Silja Schandorff is a ballet dancer, who was at the Royal Danish Ballet from 1985 to 2009.
