= Compton Gonsalves =

Trinidadian cyclist (1926–2012)

Personal information
- Full name: Compton Aloysius Gonsalves
- Born: 11 December 1926 Georgetown, British Guiana
- Died: 8 March 2012 (aged 85) Tunapuna–Piarco, Trinidad and Tobago

Cycling career
- Sport: Cycling

Compton Aloysius Gonsalves (11 December 1926 – 8 March 2012) was a Trinidadian cyclist. He competed in the time trial and the sprint events at the 1948 Summer Olympics.
