= Ward Van de Velde =

Belgian cyclist

Personal information
- Full name: Edward Van de Velde
- Born: 19 June 1930 Hamme, Belgium
- Died: 7 March 2010 (aged 79) Ostend, Belgium

Cycling career
- Sport: Cycling

Edward Van de Velde (19 June 1930 – 7 March 2010) was a Belgian cyclist. He competed in the sprint event at the 1948 Summer Olympics.
