= Jacques Bellenger =

French cyclist (1927–2020)

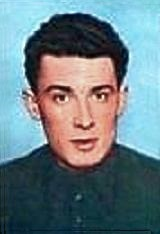
- Jacques Bellenger

Personal information
- Born: 25 December 1927 Amiens, France
- Died: 24 October 2020 (aged 92)

Cycling career
- Sport: Cycling

Jacques Bellenger (25 December 1927 – 24 October 2020) was a French cyclist. He competed in the sprint event at the 1948 Summer Olympics. In 1949 he won the International Champion of Champions sprint at Herne Hill velodrome.
