= Jan Hijzelendoorn =

Dutch cyclist (1929–2008)

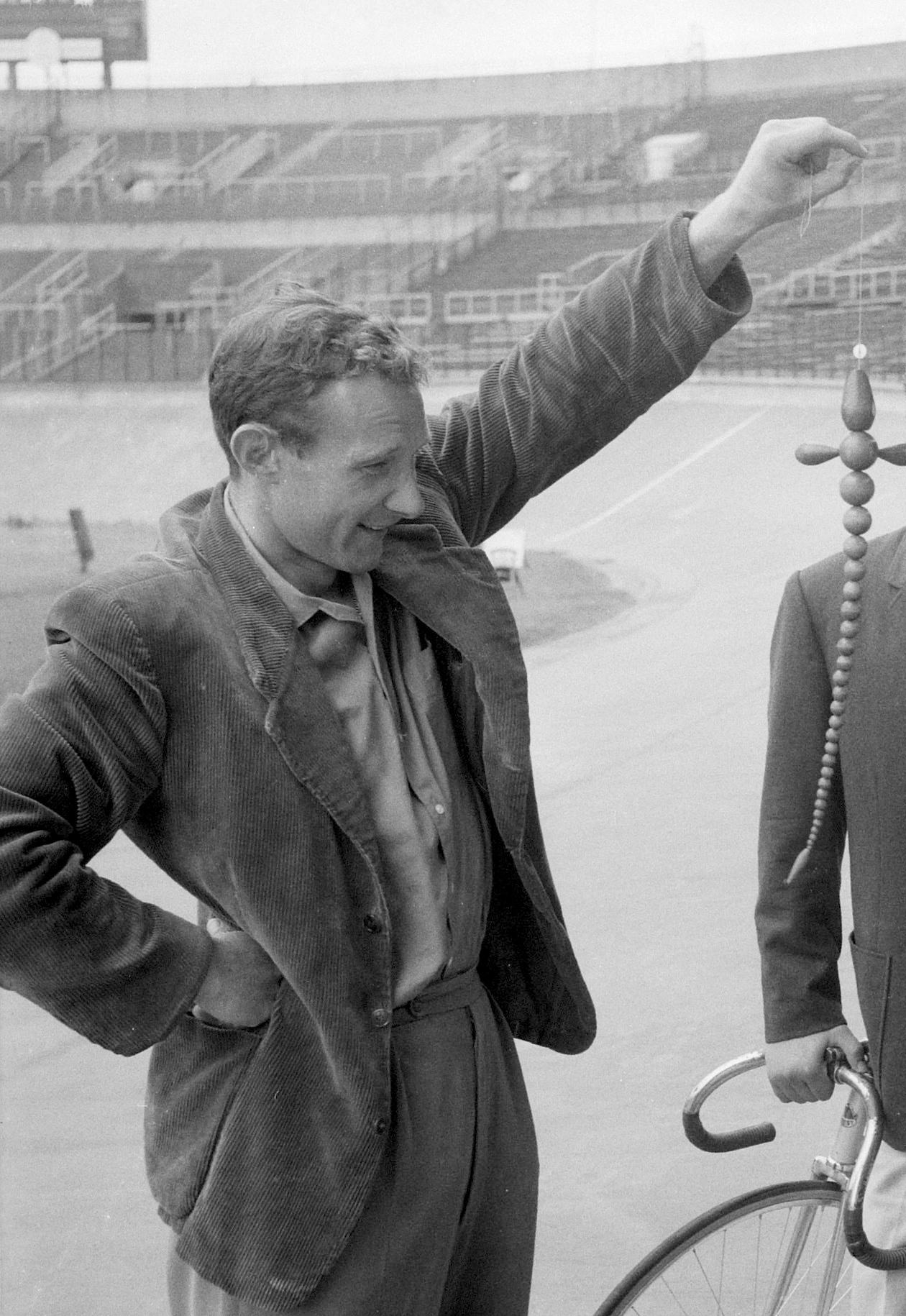
- Jan Hijzelendoorn in 1959

Personal information
- Born: 20 March 1929 Amsterdam, Netherlands
- Died: 22 October 2008 (aged 79) Uithoorn, Netherlands

Cycling career
- Sport: Cycling
Medal record
Representing the Netherlands
Track World Championships
Bronze medal – third place	1950 Liège	Sprint

Jan Hijzelendoorn (20 March 1929 – 22 October 2008) was a Dutch track cyclist who was active between 1948 and 1959. He competed at the 1948 and 1952 Summer Olympics in sprint events with the best achievement of eights place in the 1 km time trial in 1952. He won a bronze medal in the sprint at the 1950 world championships. In 1948 and 1951 he won the International Champion of Champions sprint at Herne Hill velodrome.

== See also ==
- List of Dutch Olympic cyclists
