= Mario Ghella =

Italian cyclist (1929–2020)

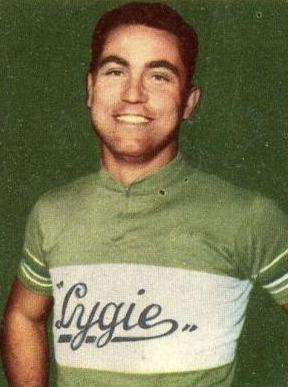

Personal information
- Born: 23 June 1929 Chieri, Italy
- Died: 10 February 2020 (aged 90)

Cycling career
- Sport: Cycling
- Discipline: Track
- Role: Rider
- Rider type: Sprinter
Medal record
Representing Italy
Men's track cycling
Olympic Games
Gold medal – first place	1948 London	Individual sprint

Mario Ghella (23 June 1929 – 10 February 2020) was an Italian racing cyclist and Olympic champion in track cycling.

== Biography ==
Mario Ghella was born in Chieri on 23 June 1929.

Ghella won a gold medal in the men's individual sprint cycling event at the 1948 Summer Olympics in London.

Ghella died on 10 February 2020, at the age of 90.
