= Paul Matteoli =

French cyclist

Personal information
- Born: 7 November 1929 Ollioules, France
- Died: 12 December 1988 (aged 59) Istres, France

Sport
- Sport: Cycling
Medal record
Representing France
Track World Championships
Bronze medal – third place	1950 Liege	Individual pursuit

Paul Matteoli (7 November 1929 – 12 December 1988) was a French cyclist who was active on the road and track between 1949 and 1956. On track, he won a bronze medal in the individual pursuit at the 1950 World Championships, as well as two national titles in 1950 and 1951. On the road, he won the Marseille-Toulon-Marseille race in 1949 and Tour de l'Ain in 1953.
