= Herne Hill Velodrome =

Outdoor velodrome in Herne Hill, south London

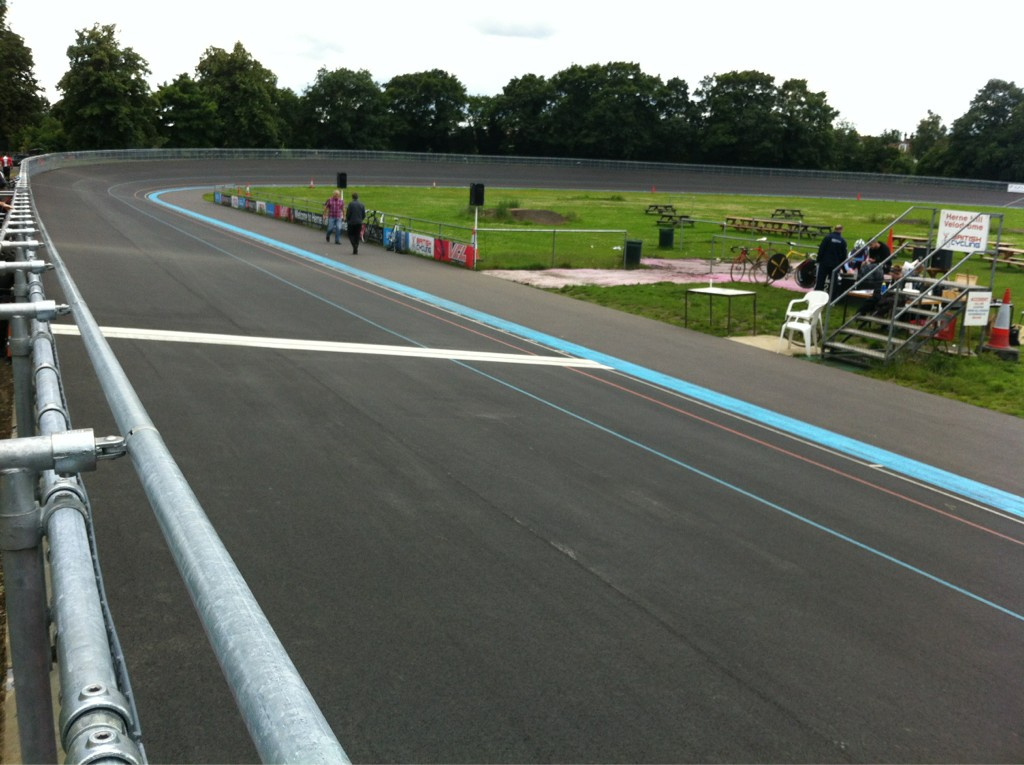
- Herne Hill in 2012
- Interactive map of Herne Hill Velodrome
- Former names: London County Grounds
- Location: Burbage Road; Herne Hill; London
- Coordinates: 51°27′4″N 0°5′29″W
- Owner: Dulwich Estate

Construction
- Built: 1891

The Herne Hill Velodrome is an outdoor velodrome in Herne Hill, in south London. It is one of the oldest cycling tracks in the world, having been built in 1891. It hosted the track cycling events in the 1948 Summer Olympics and was briefly the home of Crystal Palace Football Club during World War I.

Between 1987, when the track at Paddington Recreation Ground was demolished, and 2011, when the London Velopark for the 2012 Summer Olympics opened, Herne Hill was the only track in London.

== History ==
Herne Hill was originally named the London County Grounds, the track of the London County Cycling and Athletic Club. It became popularly known as Herne Hill track or velodrome after its position just off Burbage Road, in Herne Hill, part of the London Borough of Southwark.

The velodrome was founded by George Hillier, an amateur racer, in 1891. Before then the leading venue had been at nearby Crystal Palace. Crystal Palace, however, had no banking and a poor surface and supporters favoured a track which opened north of the Thames in Paddington, in 1888. Hillier had been a leading light at Crystal Palace and tried to persuade the owners, the Crystal Palace Company, to win back the supporters and racers by redesigning the track. The company declined and Hillier looked for a new site south of the Thames. He found an area off Burbage Road in Herne Hill and leased it from Dulwich College Trustees.

Work on the new track was undertaken by W. and J. Peacock, a building company sympathetic to cycling. It started in September 1890 and finished, ahead of schedule, in March 1891. The first race, open only to members of the Herne Hill club, was on 16 April 1891. The first open meeting was on 23 May that same year.

The circuit was designed with 5 ft bankings which were later raised. The original surface was red shale, which needed repeated rolling. It was replaced in 1893 by wooden slats, which led to fast racing but frequent crashes after rain. Concrete was laid instead in 1896.

Many records were beaten on the track, which reached a peak of popularity with the Cuca Cup 24-hour races at the end of the 19th century.

=== Good Friday meetings ===
From 1903 it was the venue for the Good Friday meeting organised by the Southern Counties Cycle Union. World champions have performed at Good Friday meetings, which during the 1920s and 1930s attracted attendances of 10,000. National and world records have been established there – Norwood Paragon's Frank Southall was a notable record-breaker in the late 1920s and early 1930s. In 1936 the tandem pairing from Addiscombe C.C. - Ernie Mills and Bill Paul set a world best of 30 miles 793 yards, unpaced in one hour, although no tandem figures were recognised by the governing body at that time.

The deterioration of the velodrome and poor weather resulting in the cancellation of the 2010 meeting led to the promoters relocating the event to Manchester Velodrome for 2011. Subsequently, the promoters announced that the meeting would be moved to London Velopark from 2014. Despite this plans for a new Good Friday meeting at Herne Hill were released, focusing on inter-schools racing, disability cycling, women-only groups, under-eights and over-40s.

=== War and the Olympics ===
The National Cyclists Union leased Herne Hill for 21 years from 25 March 1942. It had been damaged during the war when the site was used for a gun battery. Weeds grew waist-high through cracks in the surface and along the track's edges by 1942. A. P. Chamberlin, secretary of the NCU, said: "The crevices between the concrete slabs of the track are covered with all kinds of growth, and I found it impossible to uproot small trees that were growing. In the back straight a luxurious grape vine has assumed interesting proportions." Work started that year to restore it to make it ready by 1943.

The organising committee of the 1948 Olympic Games chose it as "the only suitable" track. It said "considerable work would have to be carried out to bring the arena, both from a competition and a spectator point of view, up to the required standard for Olympic events." The track was repaired, permanent stands were built - the only permanent construction work carried out by the Games organisers - and the approach roads and turnstiles were improved and extended. A temporary stand was built in the back straight for journalists, who had 12 telephone boxes to report to the world. A small scoreboard was also put up, which the crowd "fully appreciated."

The cycling press said it was disappointed that the Games opened at Herne Hill without ceremony:

What a strange nation we British are! The greatest cycling festival of this century—the XIVth Olympiad—might well have been an ordinary track promotion on the opening day at Herne Hill. Greatest oversight was the omission of any form of opening ceremony. The sparse crowd of 3,000 which gathered to watch the two-hour morning racing session received a lukewarm greeting over the loudspeakers and were then immediately given the draw of the 1,000m sprint.

The racing was reported as good but the organisation poor:

The worst organisation of the entire XIVth Olympiad cycling events resulted in the deciding third heat of the tandem final being held at nine o'clock. It was so dark when the two tandem pairs lined up for the final run that the Italians, in their blue racing vests, were invisible against the background of spectators. To put two tandems on the track under such conditions was a disgrace.

The light was so poor that the photo-finish camera did not work and judges told photographers not to use flash for fear of harming both their and the racers' night vision.

=== Professional circus ===
The National Cyclists' Union opened what became known as a professional circus there in May 1952, under the track's manager, John Dennis. The plan was to bring crowds to the track, making it profitable, and to establish professional racing in Britain. Among those who took professional licences was a prominent road rider, Dave Bedwell

=== Survival ===
The track held meetings featuring star internationals such as Jacques Anquetil, Fausto Coppi, Reg Harris and Tom Simpson during the 1950s and 1960s. The future of the track then became less certain. A campaign was fought to retain it during the early 2000s following a dispute between the landlord, Dulwich Estate, and the leaseholder, Southwark Council. A feature, said the journalist Richard Williams, was "a lease long enough to make it worthwhile to undertake the necessary refurbishment of the grandstand, which is closed for safety reasons, and the 450‑metre track itself." Bill Wright of British Cycling, formed by the merger of the National Cyclists Union with the British League of Racing Cyclists in the 1950s, said: "The problem is that the venue is underfunded and deteriorating, and desperately in need of refurbishment but cannot get the investment it needs unless landlords Dulwich Estate renew their lease, something Dulwich Estate is reluctant to do. The estate, which also owns the land of some of the area’s prestigious public schools such as Dulwich College and Alleyn's School, is legally required to get the best return on its investment for benefactors. However, it also has a commitment to community upkeep." A supporter of the campaign was Olympic gold medallist Bradley Wiggins, who started racing at Herne Hill when he was 12. The campaign has also attracted support from British racing cyclists Victoria Pendleton and Ben Swift, as well as local residents Jo Brand and James Nesbitt.

== Structures and facilities ==
Unlike a modern Olympic velodrome (which will have an inner circumference of 250m, and banking of about 45°), Herne Hill is a shallow concrete bowl measuring approximately 450m with the steepest banking 18°.

The grandstand shown in this photo is the original one dating from 1891, it has now (2016) been demolished and replaced with a new structure. In the 1890s there was a cinder athletics track inside the cycle track, and tennis courts within that. The tennis courts later became the site of a football/rugby pitch, but the track centre now includes a 250m flat warmup track as well as square multi use area. The centre of the track is also used as part of regular cyclo-cross races which also use the off road trails behind the main track.

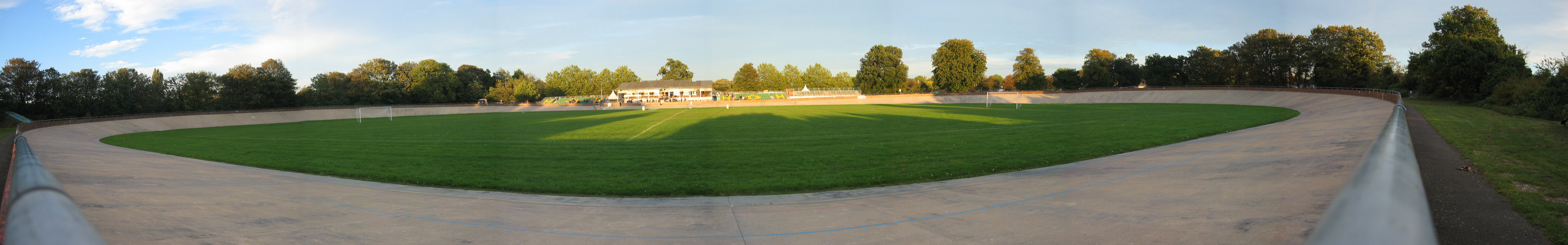
Panoramic of Herne Hill Velodrome in 2004

== Other uses ==
The Velodrome was home of Crystal Palace F.C. from 1914 until 1918, when the club then moved to The Nest opposite Selhurst Station. Crystal Palace were forced by the Admiralty to leave Crystal Palace Football Stadium and move to the Velodrome due to the Crystal Palace being commandeered for World War I training purposes. Typically Crystal Palace FC drew crowds of 3,000 – 4,000.

The FA Amateur Cup final in 1911, between Bromley and Bishop Auckland, was also played at Herne Hill as well as the Surrey Senior Cup finals in 1906 and 1909.

London Irish was the first rugby club to be based at the Velodrome. It was the club's first home ground from 1898 to 1902.

London Welsh Rugby Club had their home at the Velodrome for 40 years after World War I, until moving to a new home in Old Deer Park in Richmond in 1957.

The athletics track inside the cycling track was used to host the 1934 WAAA Championships on 30 June 1934.

The stadium was also used for motor cycle events pre WWI.

== Regeneration ==
As part of the Southwark Olympic Legacy Project work began on the upgrade of the Velodrome in February 2013. The first phase included the construction of a new Junior 250m track, a hardstanding area for warming up and to hold activities like bike-ability, bike polo and non-conventional bikes (e.g. handbikes and other cycles used by Wheels for Wellbeing) and installation of floodlights for longer training sessions in the winter.

A £200,000 grant from British Cycling allowed the track to be resurfaced, and £1.5 million was secured from Sport England and the London Marathon Trust for the construction of a new pavilion, which began in April 2016 and was completed in 2017. The pavilion, designed by Mike Taylor of Hopkins Architects (who also designed the London Olympic Velodrome), was opened in March 2017 with a ribbon-cutting ceremony carried out by Union Cycliste Internationale President Brian Cookson.

== See also ==
- List of cycling tracks and velodromes
