= 1948 Summer Olympics =

Multi-sport event in London, England

Games of the XIV Olympiad
- Emblem of the 1948 Summer Olympics
- Location: London, United Kingdom
- Nations: 59
- Athletes: 4,396 (Olympic Museum); 4,104 (3,714 men, 390 women; other)
- Events: 153 in 21 sports (23 disciplines), 3 art competitions
- Opening: 29 July 1948
- Closing: 14 August 1948
- Opened by: King George VI
- Cauldron: John Mark
- Stadium: Wembley Stadium

The 1948 Summer Olympics, officially the Games of the XIV Olympiad and officially branded as London 1948, were an international multi-sport event held from 29 July to 14 August 1948 in London, United Kingdom. Following a twelve-year hiatus caused by the outbreak of World War II, these were the first Summer Olympics held since the 1936 Games in Berlin. The 1940 Olympic Games had been scheduled for Tokyo and then for Helsinki, while the 1944 Olympic Games had been provisionally planned for London. This was the second time London hosted the Olympic Games, having previously hosted them in 1908, making it the second city to host the Summer Olympics twice (after Paris). The Olympics would return again to London 64 years later in 2012, making London the first city to host the games three times, and the only such city until Paris, who hosted their third games in 2024, and Los Angeles, who will host theirs in 2028. The 1948 Olympic Games were also the first of two summer Games held under the IOC presidency of Sigfrid Edström. The 1948 Summer Olympics were the only Summer Olympics to be held in the 1940s, as the 1940 and 1944 Summer Olympics were cancelled due to World War II. It was also the first Summer Olympics that took place during the Cold War.

The 1948 Olympics came to be known as the "Austerity Games" due to the difficult economic climate and the rationing imposed in the aftermath of World War II. No new venues were built for the games (with events taking place mainly at Wembley Stadium, also known as Empire Stadium, and the Empire Pool at Wembley Park), and athletes were housed in existing accommodation at the Wembley area instead of an Olympic Village, as were the 1936 Games and the subsequent 1952 Games in Helsinki. A record 59 nations were represented by 4,104 athletes, 3,714 men and 390 women, in 19 sport disciplines. Germany and Japan were not invited to participate in the games; the Soviet Union was invited but chose not to send any athletes, sending observers instead to prepare for the 1952 Olympics. Israel requested to participate (symbolically represented by Raya Bronstein and Frieda Berson-Lichtblau) but was denied as the International Olympic Committee did not yet recognise the country, while the Olympic mandate of Palestine expired. This in turn shifted the view of the Arab countries who had intended to boycott the event and now decided to take part.

One of the star performers at the 1948 Games was Dutch sprinter Fanny Blankers-Koen. Dubbed the "Flying Housewife", the thirty-year-old mother of two won four gold medals in athletics. In the decathlon, Bob Mathias of the United States became the youngest male ever to win an Olympic track and field gold medal at the age of seventeen. The most individual medals were won by Veikko Huhtanen of Finland, who took three golds, a silver and a bronze in men's gymnastics. The United States topped the medal table.

== Election as host city ==
In June 1939, the International Olympic Committee (IOC) awarded the 1944 Olympic Summer Games to London, ahead of Rome, Detroit, Budapest, Lausanne, Helsinki, Montreal and Athens. World War II stopped the plans and the Games were cancelled so London again stood as a candidate for 1948. Great Britain almost handed the 1948 games to the United States due to post-war financial and rationing problems, but King George VI said that hosting the Olympics would help to restore Britain from World War II. The official report of the London Olympics shows that London was not pressed to run the Games against its will. It says:

The Games of 1944 had been allocated to London and so it was that in November 1945, the Chairman of the British Olympic Council, Lord Burghley, went to Stockholm and saw the president of the International Olympic Committee to discuss the question of London being chosen for this great event. As a result, an investigating committee was set up by the British Olympic Council to work out in some detail the possibility of holding the Games. After several meetings they recommended to the council that the Lord Mayor of London should be invited to apply for the allocation of the Games in 1948.

In June 1946 the IOC, through a postal vote, gave the summer Games to London and the winter competition to St Moritz. London was selected ahead of Baltimore, Minneapolis, Lausanne, Los Angeles, and Philadelphia.

London, which had previously hosted the 1908 Summer Olympics, became the second city to host the Olympics twice; Paris hosted the event in 1900 and 1924. London later became the first city to host the Olympics for a third time when the city hosted the 2012 Summer Olympics.

== Organisation ==
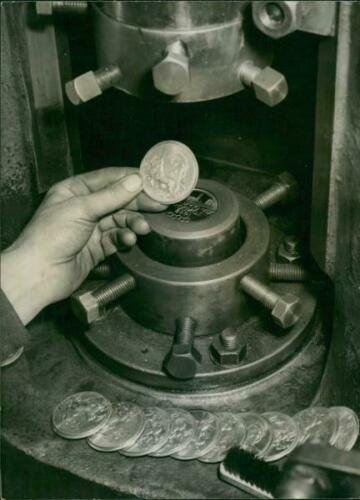
1948 London Olympic medals being minted at the works of John Pinches in Clapham

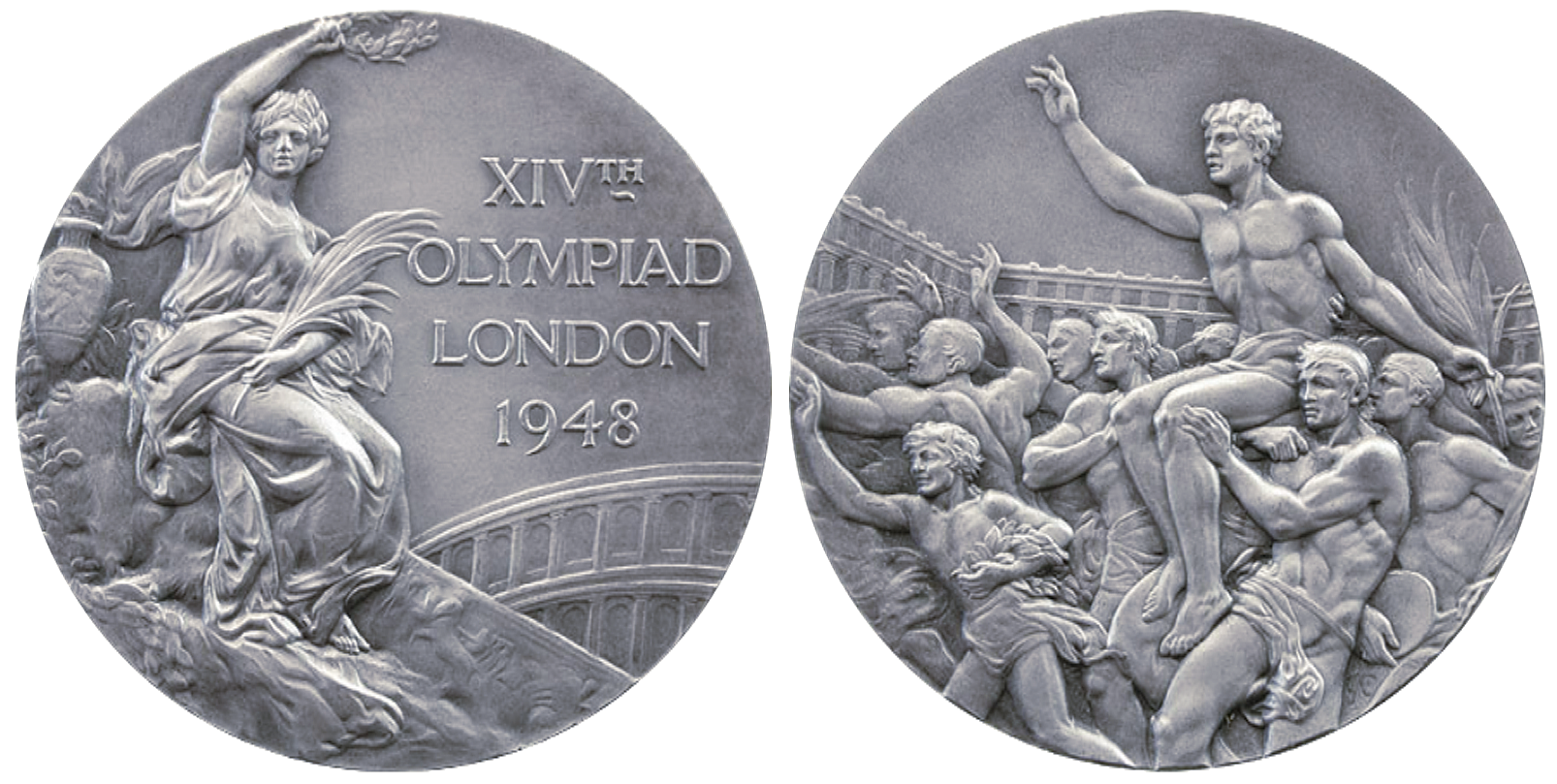
Medal used at the 1948 games

Lord Burghley, a gold medal winner at the 1928 Olympics, member of the International Olympic Committee (IOC), and president of the Amateur Athletics Association was named Chairman of the Organising and Executive Committees. The other members of the committees were: Colonel Evan Hunter, General Secretary of the British Olympic Association, and Chief de mission for Great Britain; Lord Aberdare, the other British member of the IOC; Sir Noel Curtis-Bennett; Alderman H.E. Fern; E.J. Holt; J. Emrys Lloyd, who became the committee's legal advisor; C.B. Cowley of the London Press and Advertising; R.B. Studdert, managing director of the Army & Navy Stores; A.E. Porritt, a member of the IOC for New Zealand who resided in London; S.F. Rous, Secretary of The Football Association; and Jack Beresford.

Olympic pictograms were introduced for the first time. There were twenty of them—one for each Olympic sport and three separate pictograms for the arts competition, the opening ceremony and the closing ceremony. They were called "Olympic symbols" and intended for use on tickets. The background of each pictogram resembled an escutcheon. Olympic pictograms appeared again 16 years later, and were used at all subsequent Summer Olympics.

At the time of the Games, food, petrol and building were still subject to the rationing imposed during the war in Britain; because of this the 1948 Olympics came to be known as the "Austerity Games". Athletes were given the same increased rations as dockers and miners, 5,467 calories a day instead of the normal 2,600. Building an Olympic Village was deemed too expensive, and athletes were housed in existing accommodation. Male competitors stayed at RAF camps in Uxbridge and West Drayton, and an Army camp in Richmond Park; female competitors in London colleges. Lord Burghley unfurled the Olympic Flag at the Richmond Park camp at an opening ceremony in July as Minister of Works, Charles Key, declared the camp open.

These were the first games to be held following the death of Pierre de Coubertin, founder of the International Olympic Committee, in 1937. They were also the last to include an arts competition, which took place at the Victoria and Albert Museum.

== Torch relay ==
Nicknamed "relay of peace" due to crossing through several countries in Europe to represent their union after the Second World War, the torch relay for these games took place from 17 to 29 July 1948, over a distance of 3,160 kilometres (1,960 mi) and 1,416 torchbearers.

The torch was designed by Ralph Lavers. There were three types of torches: the standard one made of aluminium and powered by solid fuel, a special one powered by butane gas (used aboard HMS Whitesand Bay) and a third one used in Wembley Stadium, made of stainless steel and powered by a magnesium candle.

The journey began with the lighting of the flame in Olympia. Due to the civil war taking place in Greece, the Greek part of the relay went directly to Corfu, where HMS Whitesand Bay picked up the flame to transport it to Bari. From there, the flame crossed Italy, Switzerland, France, Luxembourg and Belgium. After a boat trip from Calais to Dover (aboard HMS Bicester), the flame travelled to several towns in South East England until its arrival at Wembley for the opening ceremony.

The cities and towns visited by the Olympic flame were as follows:

Nation	Cities and towns
Greece	Olympia, Katakolon, Corfu.
Italy	Bari, Foggia, Pescara, Ancona, Rimini, Bologna, Parma, Piacenza, Milan, Domodossola, the Simplon Pass.
Switzerland	Brig, Martigny, Montreux, Lausanne, Geneva, Perly.
France	St. Julien en Genevois, Belgarde, Nantua, Lons-le-Saulnier, Poligny, Besançon, Vesoul, Épinal, Nancy, Metz, Thionville, Évrange.
Luxembourg	Frisange, Esch, Luxembourg City, Ettelbruck, Wiltz.
Belgium	Bras, Bastogne, Marche, Namur, Brussels, Renaix, Tournai, Hertain.
France	Lille, Armentières, St. Omer, Calais.
England, United Kingdom	Dover, Canterbury, Charing, Maidstone, Westerham, Redhill, Reigate, Dorking, Guildford, Bagshot, Ascot, Windsor, Slough, Uxbridge, London.

== Opening ceremony ==
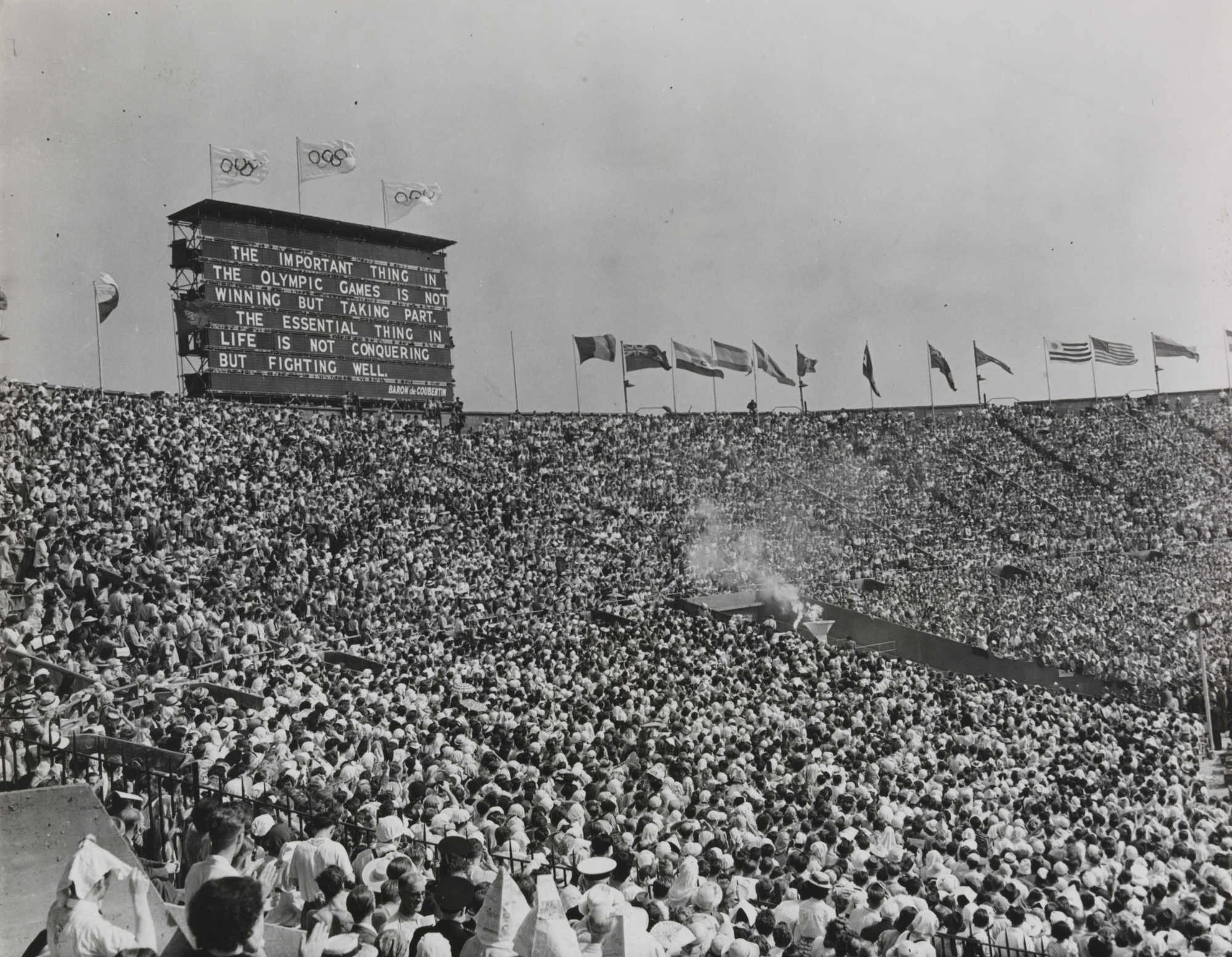
The XIV Olympic Games opens in London, 1948

The Games opened on 29 July. Army bands began playing at 2 pm for the 85,000 spectators in Empire Stadium at Wembley Park. The international and national organisers arrived at 2.35 pm and King George VI and Queen Elizabeth, with Queen Mary and other members of the Royal Family, at 2.45 pm. Fifteen minutes later the competitors entered the stadium in a procession that took 50 minutes. The last team was that of the United Kingdom. When it had passed the saluting base, Lord Burghley began his welcome:

Your Majesty: The hour has struck. A visionary dream has today become a glorious reality. At the end of the worldwide struggle in 1945, many institutions and associations were found to have withered and only the strongest had survived. How, many wondered, had the great Olympic Movement prospered?

After welcoming the athletes to two weeks of "keen but friendly rivalry", he said London represented a "warm flame of hope for a better understanding in the world which has burned so low."

At 4 pm, the time shown on the clock tower on the London Games symbol, the King declared the Games open, 2,500 pigeons were set free and the Olympic Flag raised to its 35 ft (11 m) flagpole at the end of the stadium. The Royal Horse Artillery sounded a 21-gun salute to welcome the last runner in the Torch Relay: John Mark, a British track and field sprinter and student at the University of Cambridge with impressive Olympian good looks. Mark ran a lap of the track – created with cinders from the domestic coal fires of Leicester – and climbed the steps to the Olympic cauldron. After saluting the crowd, he turned and lit the flame. After more speeches, Donald Finlay of the British team (given his RAF rank of Wing Commander) took the Olympic Oath on behalf of all competitors. The National Anthem was sung and the massed athletes turned and marched out of the stadium, led by Greece, tailed by Britain.

The 580-page official report concluded:

Thus were launched the Olympic Games of London, under the most happy auspices. The smooth-running Ceremony, which profoundly moved not only all who saw it but also the millions who were listening-in on the radio throughout the world, and the glorious weather in which it took place, combined to give birth to a spirit which was to permeate the whole of the following two weeks of thrilling and intensive sport.

== Television coverage ==
The opening ceremony and over 60 hours of Games coverage was broadcast live on BBC television, which was then officially available only in the London area. However, the BBC's transmissions could be received much further away in the right conditions, and some of the Games were watched by at least one viewer in the Channel Islands. The BBC's official report on the coverage estimated that an average of half a million viewers watched each of their Olympic broadcasts. The BBC paid £1,000 for the broadcasting rights.

Of the live television coverage, only a small section of the opening ceremony broadcast still exists in the archives. However, various filmed reports shot for the BBC's Television Newsreel program do also still exist.

== Sports ==
The 1948 Summer Olympics featured 136 medal events, covering 23 disciplines in 17 different sports and in arts.

In the list below, the number of events in each discipline is noted in parentheses.

- Aquatics
  - Diving (4)
  - Swimming (11)
  - Water polo (1)
- Athletics (33)
- Basketball (1)
- Boxing (8)
- Canoeing (9)
- Cycling
  - Road (2)
  - Track (4)
- Equestrian
  - Dressage (2)
  - Eventing (2)
  - Show jumping (2)
- Fencing (7)
- Field hockey (1)
- Football (1)
- Gymnastics (9)
- Modern pentathlon (1)
- Rowing (7)
- Sailing (5)
- Shooting (4)
- Weightlifting (6)
- Wrestling
  - Freestyle (8)
  - Greco-Roman (8)

These Games also included Lacrosse and Swedish (Ling) gymnastics as demonstration sports.

=== Athletics ===
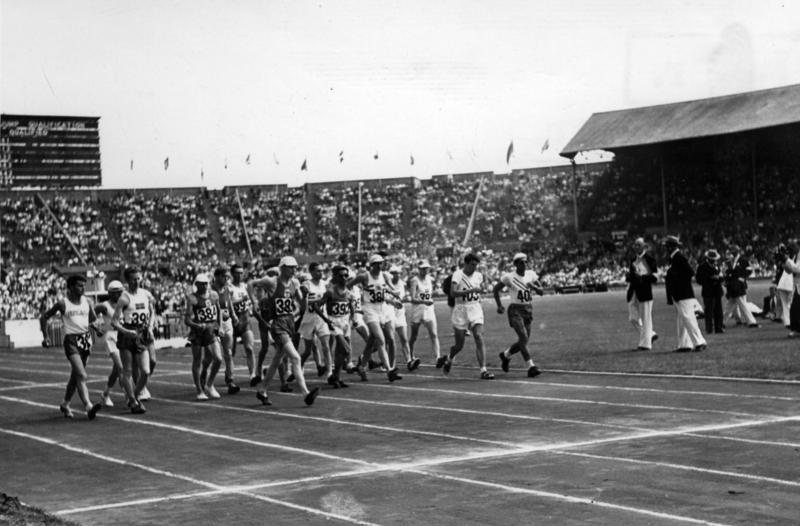
Start of the 50 km walk

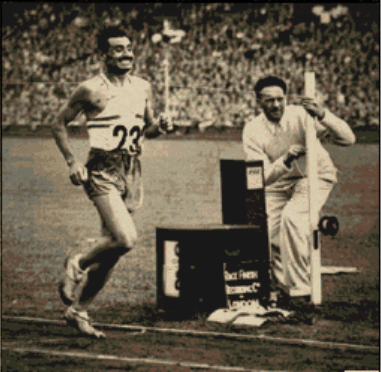
Delfo Cabrera crossing the finish line to take gold in the marathon

Empire Stadium was the venue for 33 athletics events at the Games; 24 for men and nine for women. Of these, four were making their Olympic debut – the men's 10 km walk, and the women's 200 metres, long jump and shot put. A total of 754 athletes from 53 countries participated in athletics. Fanny Blankers-Koen of the Netherlands, a 30-year-old mother of two children nicknamed "The Flying Housewife", won four gold medals, in the 100 metres, 200 metres, 80 metre hurdles, and 4 × 100 metre relay. As world record holder in the long jump and high jump Blankers-Koen may have been able to win further medals but, at this time, female athletes were limited to three individual events. Duncan White won the first medal of any kind for Sri Lanka (then Ceylon) when he finished second in the 400 metre hurdles. Arthur Wint became the first Jamaican to win an Olympic gold medal, in the men's 400 metres; he also won silver in the men's 800 metres. Audrey Patterson became the first African-American woman to win a medal, winning bronze in a track and field event. A few days later Alice Coachman became the first woman of colour in the world and the first African-American woman to win a gold medal in track and field in the history of the modern Olympics with a jump of 1.68 m (5' 6 1/4"). She also was the only American woman to win an athletics gold medal during the 1948 Olympics.

The marathon saw a dramatic finish with the first man to enter the stadium, Etienne Gailly of Belgium, exhausted and nearly unable to run. While he was struggling, Argentinian athlete Delfo Cabrera and Tom Richards of Great Britain passed him, with Cabrera winning the gold medal and Richards obtaining the silver. Gailly managed to recover enough to cross the line for the bronze.

The decathlon was won by 17-year-old Bob Mathias of the United States. He became the youngest ever Olympic gold medallist in athletics and when asked how he would celebrate he replied: "I'll start shaving, I guess."

=== Arts ===
Categories: sports-related architecture, literature, music, painting, and sculpture. These Olympics were the last time art competitions were considered Olympic events.

=== Basketball ===
Basketball made its second appearance as a medal sport, appearing as an indoor competition for the first time after poor weather disrupted the matches at the 1936 Berlin Games. The event, for men only, was contested by 23 nations split into four pools for the preliminary round; the top two in each pool advanced to the quarterfinals with the other teams entering playoffs for the minor placings. The United States and France reached the final which was won by the Americans 65–21 to claim the gold medal. This was the second of the United States' seven consecutive gold medals in Olympic men's and women's basketball. Brazil defeated Mexico 52–47 to claim bronze.

=== Boxing ===
Eight different classifications were contested ranging from flyweight, for boxers weighing less than 51 kg, to heavyweight, for boxers over 80 kg. South Africa, Argentina and Hungary each won two gold medals.

=== Canoeing ===
Nine events were contested, eight for men and one for women. This marked the first time that a women's canoeing event had been contested in the Olympics. Sweden won four gold medals (two by Gert Fredriksson) and Czechoslovakia three.

=== Cycling ===
Six events were contested – two road bicycle racing events and four track cycling events. No women's cycling events were contested. France won three gold medals and Italy two, while Great Britain captured five medals overall, but none were gold.

=== Diving ===
Four diving events were contested, two for men, and two for women. The events are labelled as 3 metre springboard and 10 metre platform by the International Olympic Committee but appeared on the 1948 Official Report as springboard diving and highboard diving, respectively. All four gold medals, and 10 out of 12 awarded in total, were won by the United States. Victoria Manalo Draves, who won both gold medals in the women's events, and Sammy Lee, who took a gold and a bronze in the men's events, became the first Asian Americans to win gold medals at an Olympic Games.

=== Equestrian ===
Six gold medals were awarded in equestrian, individual and team dressage, individual and team eventing and individual and team show jumping. Harry Llewellyn and Foxhunter, who would claim a gold medal in Helsinki, won bronze in the team jumping event.

=== Fencing ===
Seven events were contested, six for men and one for women. Ilona Elek, who had won the women's foil competition in Berlin, was one of only two competitors to successfully defend an Olympic title in London. Elek's sister, Margit, placed sixth in the same event. Edoardo Mangiarotti won three medals, two silver and a bronze, having previously won a gold medal in the 1936 Games. Throughout his career the Italian won 13 Olympic fencing medals and 27 world championship medals, both of which remain records.

=== Field hockey ===
Thirteen nations participated in the field hockey competition. The tournament was ultimately won by India, who defeated Great Britain to claim the country's first gold medal as an independent nation under captain Kishan Lal and Vice-Captain Kunwar Digvijay Singh.

=== Football ===
Eighteen teams entered the football competition at these Olympics. Due to the rise of the professional game during the 12 years since the Berlin Olympics the number of talented amateurs for teams to select from was reduced. The gold medal was won by Sweden, who defeated Yugoslavia 3–1 in the final. Denmark defeated hosts Great Britain, managed by Matt Busby of Manchester United, 5–3 to win the bronze medal. In the tournament's 18 matches a total of 102 goals were scored; an average 5.66 goals per match. The joint top scorers with seven goals each were Gunnar Nordahl of Sweden and Denmark's John Hansen. Nordahl and Swedish teammates Gunnar Gren and Nils Liedholm went on to play for A.C. Milan and together were nicknamed Gre-No-Li.

This was the first international football tournament ever to be broadcast on television, with the two semi-finals, the bronze medal match and the final all being shown live in full by the BBC.

=== Gymnastics ===
Nine events were contested, eight for men, and one for women. In the men's pommel horse, a tie was declared between three competitors, all Finns, and no medals other than gold were awarded in this event. Finland won six gold medals overall, and Switzerland three.

=== Lacrosse ===
Lacrosse was an exhibition sport at these Olympics. An English team composed of players from various universities played a U.S. team represented by Rensselaer Polytechnic Institute at the Empire Stadium.

=== Modern pentathlon ===
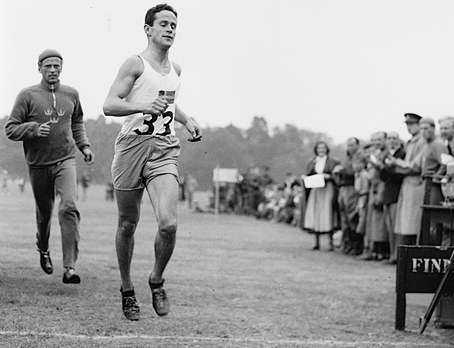
Gold medalist William Grut of Sweden (foreground) competing in the running component of the modern pentathlon.

Only one modern pentathlon event was contested, the five component sports– riding, fencing, shooting, swimming, and running- being held over six days. Scoring was by point-for-place system across the five phases with the winner being the athlete with the lowest combined ranking. The sport's international federation, the Union Internationale de Pentathlon Moderne was founded during the Games, on 3 August 1948. Sweden won two medals in the event; William Grut won the gold, with a final points total of 16, and Gösta Gärdin took bronze. American George Moore won the silver medal.

=== Rowing ===
Seven rowing events were contested, all open to men only. Great Britain and the United States each claimed two gold medals. The events were held on the River Thames at Henley, over the same course as the Henley Royal Regatta.

=== Sailing ===
The sailing events at the Games took place in Torquay, in the southwest of Great Britain. Five events were contested, with the United States winning four total medals. One of host nation Great Britain's three gold medals at the Games came in the Swallow class from Stewart Morris and David Bond. In the Firefly class Danish sailor Paul Elvstrøm won gold the despite the Danish Olympic Committee having misgivings about sending him to compete as the 18-year-old could speak no English. This was the first of four consecutive Olympics with a gold medal for Elvstrøm.

=== Shooting ===
Four events were contested, all open to both men and women, although all medals were won by men. In the 50 metre rifle, prone position, only two points separated the top three competitors. Károly Takács had been a member of the Hungary's world champion pistol shooting team in 1938 when a grenade shattered his right hand – his pistol hand. Takács taught himself to shoot with his left hand and, 10 years after his injury, he won an Olympic gold medal in the rapid-fire pistol event.

=== Swimming ===
Eleven events were contested, six for men and five for women. The United States won eight gold medals, including all six men's events, and 15 medals in total.

=== Water polo ===
Eighteen nations fielded a team in these games, which were ultimately won by Italy, who were undefeated throughout. The tournament was conducted in a mult-tier bracket, with the best four teams from the group stages participating in a final round-robin bracket. Silver was claimed by Hungary, and bronze by the Netherlands.

=== Weightlifting ===
Six events were contested, all for men only. These games marked the addition of the bantamweight class to the Olympic programme, the first change to the programme since 1920. The United States won four gold medals, and eight overall; the remaining two gold medals were claimed by Egypt. Rodney Wilkes won the first medal for Trinidad and Tobago in an Olympic games, winning silver and Mohammad Jafar Salmasi won the first medal for Iran in an Olympic games, winning bronze in the featherweight division; gold medal was won by Egyptian Mahmoud Fayad, with a new Olympic and World record of 332.5 kg.

=== Wrestling ===
Sixteen wrestling events were held, eight Greco-Roman and eight freestyle. All were open to men only. Both categories were dominated by two nations. Turkey was the most successful nation with six gold medals followed by Sweden receiving 5 gold medals. These two teams claimed 24 total medals, in other words half of the total medals given.

== Political defection ==
London was the first Olympics to have a political defection. Marie Provazníková, the 57-year-old Czechoslovak President of the International Gymnastics Federation, refused to return home, citing "lack of freedom" after the Czechoslovak coup in February led to the country's inclusion in the Soviet Bloc.

== Media ==
For the 1948 Olympics, the Technicolor Corporation devised a bipack colour filming process – dubbed "Technichrome" – whereby hundreds of hours of film documented the events in colour, without having to use expensive and heavy Technicolor cameras.

Slightly over 2,000 journalists attended the 1948 Games.

== Venues ==
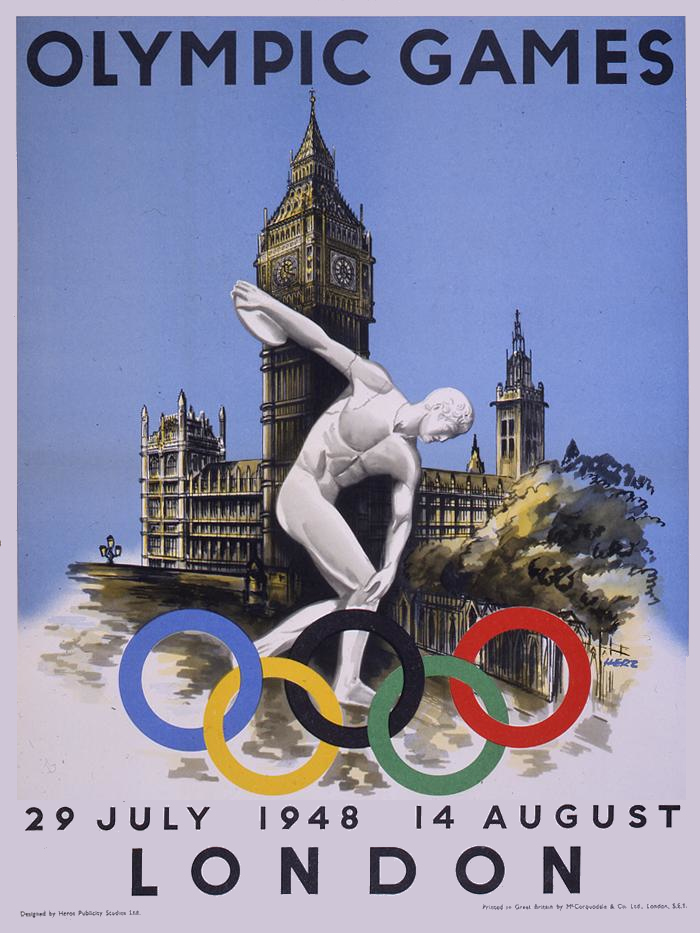
Poster promoting the 1948 Olympics

No new venues were built for the Games. A cinder track was laid inside Empire Stadium and all other venues were adapted. For the first time at the Olympics, swimming events were held under cover, at the 8000 capacity Empire Pool. As the pool was longer than the standard Olympic length of 50 metres a platform was constructed across the pool which both shortened it and housed officials. In 2010 one of the last remaining venues from the Games, the Herne Hill Velodrome where cycling events were staged, was saved when a new 15-year lease was agreed, so that repairs could take place. Campaigners and users of the track had feared that it would be forced to close as it was in desperate need of refurbishment.

- Wembley Empire Exhibition Grounds
  - Empire Stadium – opening and closing ceremonies, athletics, equestrian (jumping), football finals, field hockey finals
  - Empire Pool – boxing, diving, swimming, water polo
  - Palace of Engineering – fencing
- Other venues
  - Empress Hall, Earl's Court – boxing preliminaries, wrestling, weightlifting, gymnastics
  - Harringay Arena, Harringay – basketball & wrestling
  - Royal Regatta Course, Henley-on-Thames – canoeing, rowing
  - Herne Hill Velodrome, Herne Hill – track cycling
  - Windsor Great Park – cycling road race
  - Central Stadium, Military Headquarters, Aldershot – equestrian (jumping), modern pentathlon (riding, fencing, swimming)
  - Tweseldown Racecourse – equestrian (dressage, eventing)
  - Arsenal Stadium, Highbury – football preliminaries
  - Selhurst Park – football preliminaries
  - Craven Cottage, Fulham – football preliminaries
  - Cricklefield Stadium, Ilford – football preliminaries
  - Griffin Park, Brentford – football preliminaries
  - Champion Hill, Dulwich – football preliminaries
  - Green Pond Road Stadium, Walthamstow – football preliminaries
  - White Hart Lane, Tottenham – football preliminaries
  - Lyons' Sports Club, Sudbury – field hockey preliminaries
  - Guinness Sports Club, Park Royal – field hockey preliminaries
  - Polytechnic Sports Ground, Chiswick – field hockey preliminaries
  - National Rifle Association Ranges, Bisley – shooting, modern pentathlon (shooting)
  - Finchley Lido, Finchley – water polo preliminaries
  - English Channel, Torbay – yachting
  - Fratton Park, Portsmouth – football preliminaries
  - Goldstone Ground, Brighton – football preliminaries
  - Royal Military Academy – modern pentathlon (running)

== Participating National Olympic Committees ==
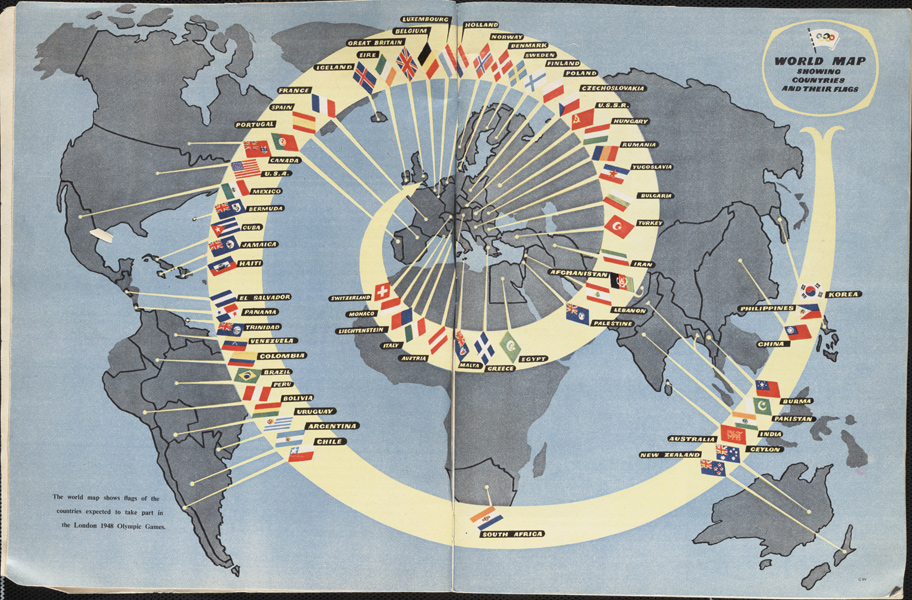
1948 Summer Olympics Poster map showing with the flags of the nations expected to be in the Summer Olympics of that year.

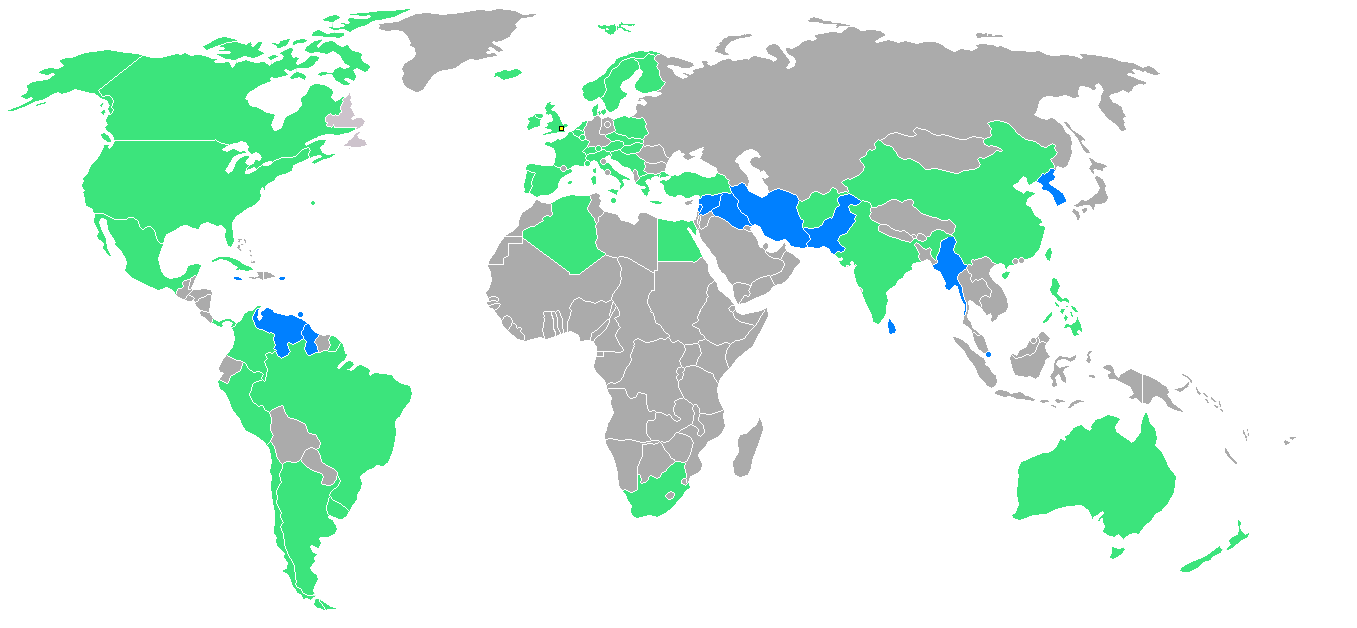
Participants

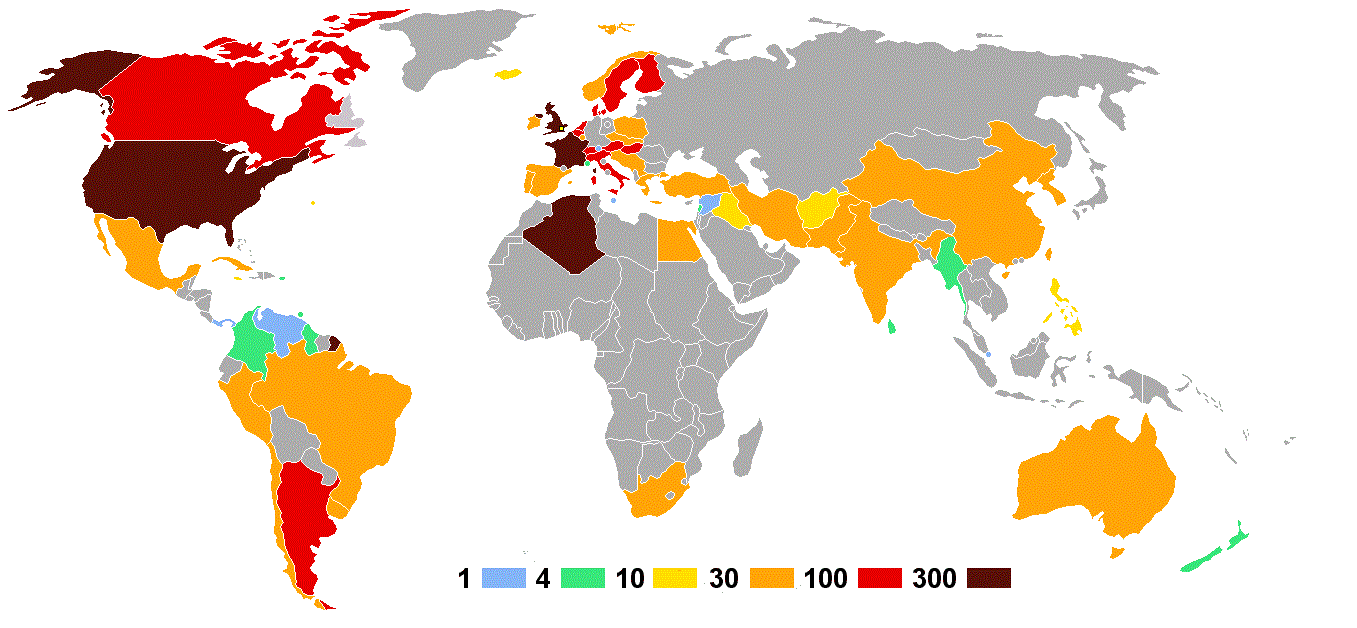
Number of athletes per country

A total of 59 nations sent athletes. Thirteen made their first official appearance: British Guiana (now Guyana), Burma (now Myanmar), Ceylon (now Sri Lanka), Iraq, Jamaica, Korea, Lebanon, Pakistan, Puerto Rico, Singapore, Syria, Trinidad and Tobago, and Venezuela. It was the first time that Australia, New Zealand, Philippines, India and Pakistan competed as fully independent nations at the Olympic Games. Germany and Japan, under Allied military occupations, were not allowed to send athletes to the games. Due to continuing labour shortages, German prisoners of war were used for the construction of the facilities for the games, in particular Olympic Way. Italy, although originally an Axis power, had defected to the Allies in 1943 following Benito Mussolini being deposed, and was allowed to send athletes. The Soviet Union was invited but chose not to send any athletes, sending observers instead to prepare for the 1952 Olympics.

The nations that returned to the games were Cuba, Iran (The last participation of a Persian athlete was in Paris 1900), Ireland, Panama and Spain.

Other nations, besides Germany and Japan, that participated in the previous games in Berlin 1936 but were absent in London 1948 were Bolivia, Bulgaria, Costa Rica, Estonia, Latvia and Lithuania. In the case of the Baltic nations, they had been occupied and annexed by the Soviet Union, only returning to the games many decades later. Bulgaria, Romania and Mandatory Palestine accepted invitations for the Games but withdrew a few days before it began.

Puerto Rico, an unincorporated territory and commonwealth of the United States, made its Olympic debut as an independent team. Bermuda, Jamaica, Trinidad and Tobago, Singapore and British Guyana were part of the British Empire.

Participating National Olympic Committees
- Afghanistan (25)
- Argentina (199)
- Australia (75)
- Austria (144)
- Belgium (152)
- Bermuda (12)
- Brazil (70)
- Burma (4)
- Canada (118)
- Ceylon (7)
- Chile (54)
- Republic of China (31)
- Colombia (6)
- Cuba (53)
- Czechoslovakia (87)
- Denmark (162)
- Egypt (85)
- Finland (129)
- France (316)
- Great Britain (404) (host)
- Greece (61)
- Guyana (4)
- Hungary (129)
- Iceland (20)
- India (79)
- Iran (36)
- Iraq (11)
- Ireland (73)
- Italy (213)
- Jamaica (13)
- South Korea (46)
- Lebanon (8)
- Liechtenstein (2)
- Luxembourg (45)
- Malta (1)
- Mexico (88)
- Monaco (4)
- Netherlands (149)
- New Zealand (7)
- Norway (81)
- Pakistan (35)
- Panama (1)
- Peru (41)
- Philippines (26)
- Poland (37)
- Portugal (48)
- Puerto Rico (9)
- Singapore (1)
- South Africa (35)
- Spain (65)
- Sweden (181)
- Switzerland (181)
- Syria (1)
- Trinidad and Tobago (5)
- Turkey (58)
- United States (300)
- Uruguay (61)
- Venezuela (1)
- Yugoslavia (90)

=== Number of athletes by National Olympic Committees ===
IOC Letter Code	Country	Athletes
GBR	Great Britain	404
FRA	France	316
USA	United States	300
ITA	Italy	215
ARG	Argentina	199
SUI	Switzerland	186
SWE	Sweden	181
DEN	Denmark	162
BEL	Belgium	152
NED	Netherlands	149
AUT	Austria	147
FIN	Finland	129
HUN	Hungary	128
CAN	Canada	118
YUG	Yugoslavia	90
MEX	Mexico	88
TCH	Czechoslovakia	87
EGY	Egypt	85
NOR	Norway	81
IND	India	79
AUS	Australia	75
IRL	Ireland	72
BRA	Brazil	70
ESP	Spain	65
GRE	Greece	61
URU	Uruguay	61
TUR	Turkey	58
CHI	Chile	54
CUB	Cuba	53
KOR	South Korea	50
POR	Portugal	48
LUX	Luxembourg	45
PER	Peru	41
POL	Poland	37
IRN	Iran	36
PAK	Pakistan	35
ZAF	South Africa	35
AFG	Afghanistan	31
ROC	Republic of China	31
PHI	Philippines	26
ISL	Iceland	20
JAM	Jamaica	13
BER	Bermuda	12
IRQ	Iraq	12
PUR	Puerto Rico	9
LIB	Lebanon	8
CEY	Ceylon	7
NZL	New Zealand	7
COL	Colombia	6
BIR	Burma	5
TRI	Trinidad and Tobago	5
GUY	Guyana	4
MON	Monaco	4
LIE	Liechtenstein	2
MLT	Malta	1
PAN	Panama	1
SGP	Singapore	1
SYR	Syria	1
VEN	Venezuela	1
Total		4,104

== Medal count ==
These are the top ten nations that won medals at the 1948 Summer Games, ranked by number of gold medals won. The host nation was 12th, with 27 medals, including four golds.

Rank	Nation	Gold	Silver	Bronze	Total
1	United States	38	27	19	84
2	Sweden	16	11	17	44
3	France	11	6	15	32
4	Hungary	10	5	12	27
5	Italy	8	11	8	27
6	Finland	8	7	5	20
7	Turkey	6	4	2	12
8	Czechoslovakia	6	2	3	11
9	Switzerland	5	10	5	20
10	Denmark	5	7	8	20
Totals (10 entries)		113	90	94	297

== See also ==
- Art competitions at the 1948 Summer Olympics
- 1948 Winter Olympics
- Olympic Games held in Great Britain
  - 1908 Summer Olympics – London
  - 1948 Summer Olympics – London
  - 2012 Summer Olympics – London
- List of IOC country codes
- Gold (2018 film), about the Indian national hockey team at the 1948 Summer Olympics

Summer Olympics
Preceded by London (1944) cancelled due to World War II	XIV Olympiad; London; 1948	Succeeded by Helsinki
