= Water polo at the 1948 Summer Olympics – Men's team squads =

Water polo at the 1948 Summer Olympics – Men's team squads

Water polo

- CF=Centre forward
- CB=Centre back
- D=Defender
- GK=Goalkeeper

== Argentina ==
Head coach:

No.	Pos.	Player	DoB	Age	Caps	Club	Tournament games	Tournament goals
		Rubén Maidana	January 12, 1923	25	?	(Argentina) Regattas Santa Fe	3	?
		Ladislao Szabo	April 11, 1923	25	?		3	?
		Hugo Prono	February 23, 1923	25	?		3	?
		Osvaldo Codaro	December 9, 1930	30	?		3	?
		Carlos Visentin	November 28, 1918	29	?		3	?
		Marcelo Visentin	May 30, 1914	34	?		3	?
		Anibál Filiberti	March 31, 1914	34	?		3	?

== Italy ==
Italy entered a squad of nine players. They scored 39 goals.

Head coach:

No.	Pos.	Player	DoB	Age	Caps	Club	Tournament games	Tournament goals
		Pasquale Buonocore	May 17, 1916	32	?	(Italy) Rari Nantes Napoli	8	0
		Emilio Bulgarelli	February 15, 1917	31	?	(Italy) Canottieri Olona Milano	8	0
		Cesare Rubini	November 2, 1923	24	?		6	0
		Geminio Ognio	December 13, 1917	30	?	(Italy) SS Lazio Nuoto	7	5
		Gildo Arena	February 25, 1921	27	?		7	13
		Aldo Ghira	April 4, 1920	28	?	(Italy) SS Lazio Nuoto	8	19
		Gianfranco Pandolfini	September 16, 1920	27	?	(Italy) Rari Nantes Florentia	6	2
		Mario Maioni	May 27, 1910	38	?	(Italy) Canottieri Olona Milano	4	0
		Tullio Pandolfini	August 6, 1914	33	?	(Italy) Rari Nantes Florentia	2	0

== Hungary ==
Hungary entered a squad of eleven players. They scored 38 goals.

Head coach:

No.	Pos.	Player	DoB	Age	Caps	Club	Tournament games	Tournament goals
		Endre Győrfi	March 30, 1920	28	?	(Hungary) Muegyetemi Atlétikai és Futball Club	6	0
		Miklós Holop	February 2, 1925	23	?	(Hungary) Muegyetemi Atlétikai és Futball Club	7	0
		Dezső Gyarmati	October 23, 1927	20	?		8	5
		Károly Szittya	June 18, 1918	30	?		7	9
		Oszkár Csuvik	March 28, 1925	23	?	(Hungary) Magyar Testgyakorlók Köre	5	7
		István Szivós	August 20, 1920	27	?		8	12
		Dezső Lemhényi	December 9, 1917	30	?		6	3
		László Jeney	May 30, 1923	25	?		2	0
		Dezső Fábián	December 17, 1918	29	?		3	0
		Jenő Brandi	May 23, 1913	35	?		3	2
		Pál Pók	June 27, 1929	19	?		1	0

== India ==
India ranked 9th in the games and scored 10 goals.

Squad

Gora Seal
Samarendra Chatterjee
Ajoy Chatterjee
Suhas Chatterjee
Dwarkadas Mukharji
Durga Das
Jamini Dass
Sachin Nag
Isaac Mansoor
Jahan Ahir

== Australia ==
Head coach:

No.	Pos.	Player	DoB	Age	Caps	Club	Tournament games	Tournament goals
		Ben Dalley	March 15, 1916	32	?	(Australia) Balmain Water Polo Club	2	?
		Jack King	August 23, 1910	37	?		1	?
		Eric Johnston	February 24, 1914	34	?	(Australia) Balmain Water Polo Club	2	?
		Les McKay	May 27, 1917	31	?		1	?
		Leon Ferguson	June 19, 1923	25	?	(Australia) Bondi ASC	1	?
		Arthur Burge	August 24, 1917	31	?	(Australia) Drummoyne Water Polo Club	2	?
		Herman Doerner	1914		?	(Australia) Bondi ASC	2	?
		Colin French	November 20, 1916	31	?		1	?
		Roger Cornforth	January 19, 1919	29	?		1	?
		Jack Ferguson	April 12, 1922	26	?	(Australia) Bondi ASC	1	?
