= Water polo at the 1948 Summer Olympics =

Water polo at the Games of the XIV Olympiad
- Venues: Finchley Lido
- Date: 28 July – 7 August 1948
- Competitors: 156 from 18 nations

Medalists
1st place, gold medalist(s)		Italy
2nd place, silver medalist(s)		Hungary
3rd place, bronze medalist(s)		Netherlands

Final results for the water polo tournament at the 1948 Summer Olympics played at Finchley Lido.

== Medal summary ==
Gold	Silver	Bronze
Italy; Gildo Arena; Emilio Bulgarelli; Pasquale Buonocore; Aldo Ghira; Mario Majoni; Geminio Ognio; Gianfranco Pandolfini; Tullo Pandolfini; Cesare Rubini	Hungary; Jenő Brandi; Oszkár Csuvik; Dezső Fábián; Dezső Gyarmati; Endre Győrfi; Miklós Holop; László Jeney; Dezső Lemhényi; Károly Szittya; István Szívós	Netherlands; Cor Braasem; Hennie Keetelaar; Nijs Korevaar; Joop Rohner; Frits Ruimschotel; Piet Salomons; Frits Smol; Hans Stam; Ruud van Feggelen

== Results ==
=== Round One ===
In the first round each team in a group played each other team in the same group. The placings were determined on points. If the points were equal, then the better goal average decided. The first two teams of each group were qualified for the second round, while the third placed team was eliminated.

Group A

Rank	Team	Pld	W	D	L	GF	GA	Pts	(Belgium)	(United States)	(Uruguay)
1.	Belgium	2	1	1	0	14	5	3	X	4:4	10:1
2.	United States	2	1	1	0	11	4	3	4:4	X	7:0
3.	Uruguay	2	0	0	2	1	17	0	1:10	0:7	X

Group B

Rank	Team	Pld	W	D	L	GF	GA	Pts	(Sweden)	(Spain)	(Switzerland)
1.	Sweden	2	2	0	0	10	2	4	X	4:1	6:1
2.	Spain	2	1	0	1	6	5	2	1:4	X	5:1
3.	Switzerland	2	0	0	2	2	11	0	1:6	1:5	X

Group C

Rank	Team	Pld	W	D	L	GF	GA	Pts	(Netherlands)	(India)	(Chile)
1.	Netherlands	2	2	0	0	26	1	4	X	12:1	14:0
2.	India	2	1	0	1	8	16	2	1:12	X	7:4
3.	Chile	2	0	0	2	4	21	0	0:14	4:7	X

Group D

Rank	Team	Pld	W	D	L	GF	GA	Pts	(Italy)	(Socialist Federal Republic of Yugoslavia)	(Australia)
1.	Italy	2	1	1	0	13	4	3	X	4:4	9:0
2.	Yugoslavia	2	1	1	0	16	7	3	4:4	X	12:3
3.	Australia	2	0	0	2	3	21	0	0:9	3:12	X

Group E

Rank	Team	Pld	W	D	L	GF	GA	Pts	(Hungary)	(Egypt)	(United Kingdom)
1.	Hungary	2	2	0	0	16	4	4	X	5:2	11:2
2.	Egypt	2	0	1	1	5	8	1	2:5	X	3:3
3.	Great Britain	2	0	1	1	5	14	1	2:11	3:3	X

Group F

Rank	Team	Pld	W	D	L	GF	GA	Pts	(France)	(Argentina)	(Greece)
1.	France	2	2	0	0	11	2	4	X	4:1	7:1
2.	Argentina	2	1	0	1	7	6	2	1:4	X	6:2
3.	Greece	2	0	0	2	3	13	0	1:7	2:6	X

=== Round Two ===
In the second round each team in a group played each other team in the same group unless they had met in a previous round. In this case the previous result stood and was carried forward to this group. So in each group only three matches had to be played. The placings were determined on points. If the points were equal, then the better goal average decided. The first two teams of each group were qualified for the semi-finals, while the third placed team was eliminated.

The results which are carried forward from the first round are shown in italics.

Group G

Rank	Team	Pld	W	D	L	GF	GA	Pts	(Sweden)	(Belgium)	(United States)
1.	Sweden	2	1	1	0	8	1	3	X	1:1	7:0
2.	Belgium	2	0	2	0	5	5	2	1:1	X	4:4
3.	United States	2	0	1	1	4	11	1	0:7	4:4	X

Group H

Rank	Team	Pld	W	D	L	GF	GA	Pts	(Netherlands)	(Spain)	(India)
1.	Netherlands	2	2	0	0	17	3	4	X	5:2	12:1
2.	Spain	2	1	0	1	13	6	2	2:5	X	11:1
3.	India	2	0	0	2	2	23	0	1:12	1:11	X

Group I

Rank	Team	Pld	W	D	L	GF	GA	Pts	(Italy)	(Hungary)	(Socialist Federal Republic of Yugoslavia)
1.	Italy	2	1	1	0	8	7	3	X	4:3	4:4
2.	Hungary	2	1	0	1	6	5	2	3:4	X	3:1
3.	Yugoslavia	2	0	1	1	5	7	1	4:4	1:3	X

Group J

Rank	Team	Pld	W	D	L	GF	GA	Pts	(France)	(Egypt)	(Argentina)
1.	France	2	1	1	0	7	4	3	X	3:3	4:1
2.	Egypt	2	0	2	0	7	7	2	3:3	X	4:4
3.	Argentina	2	0	1	1	5	8	1	1:4	4:4	X

=== Semi-finals ===
As in the second round each team in a group played each other team in the same group unless they had met in a previous round. In this case the previous result stood and was carried forward to this group. So in each group only three matches had to be played. The placings were determined on points. If the points were equal, then the better goal average decided. The first two teams of each group were qualified for the final round, while the third and fourth placed team were eliminated and took part in a consolation tournament.

The results which are carried forward from the previous rounds are shown in italics.

Group K

Rank	Team	Pld	W	D	L	GF	GA	Pts	(Netherlands)	(Belgium)	(Sweden)	(Spain)
1.	Netherlands	3	2	1	0	13	8	5	X	3:3	5:3	5:2
2.	Belgium	3	1	2	0	8	5	4	3:3	X	1:1	4:1
3.	Sweden	3	1	1	1	8	7	3	3:5	1:1	X	4:1
4.	Spain	3	0	0	3	4	13	0	2:5	1:4	1:4	X

Group L

Rank	Team	Pld	W	D	L	GF	GA	Pts	(Italy)	(Hungary)	(France)	(Egypt)
1.	Italy	3	3	0	0	14	6	6	X	4:3	5:2	5:1
2.	Hungary	3	2	0	1	13	10	4	3:4	X	5:4	5:2
3.	France	3	0	1	2	9	13	1	2:5	4:5	X	3:3
4.	Egypt	3	0	1	2	6	13	1	1:5	2:5	3:3	X

=== Final round ===
As in all other rounds each team in the final played each other team unless they had met in a previous round. In this case the previous result stood and was carried forward to the final. So in the final only four matches had to be played. The placings were determined on points. If the points were equal, then the better goal average decided.

The results which are carried forward from the previous rounds are shown in italics.

Final Group

Rank	Team	Pld	W	D	L	GF	GA	Pts	(Italy)	(Hungary)	(Netherlands)	(Belgium)
Gold medal	Italy	3	3	0	0	12	7	6	X	4:3	4:2	4:2
Silver medal	Hungary	3	1	1	1	10	8	3	3:4	X	4:4	3:0
Bronze medal	Netherlands	3	0	2	1	9	11	2	2:4	4:4	X	3:3
4.	Belgium	3	0	1	2	5	10	1	2:4	0:3	3:3	X

Group for fifth to eighth places - consolation tournament

Rank	Team	Pld	W	D	L	GF	GA	Pts	(Sweden)	(France)	(Egypt)	(Spain)
5.	Sweden	3	2	1	0	8	4	5	X	1:1	3:2	4:1
6.	France	3	1	2	0	6	5	4	1:1	X	3:3	2:1
7.	Egypt	3	1	1	1	8	7	3	2:3	3:3	X	3:1
8.	Spain	3	0	0	3	3	9	0	1:4	1:2	1:3	X

== Participating nations ==
Each country was allowed to enter a team of 11 players and they all were eligible for participation.

A total of 155(*) water polo players from 18 nations competed at the London Games:

- Argentina (7)
- Australia (10)
- Belgium (8)
- Chile (8)
- Egypt (8)
- France (11)
- Great Britain (8)
- Greece (8)
- Hungary (10)
- India (10)
- Italy (9)
- Netherlands (9)
- Spain (8)
- Switzerland (7)
- Sweden (10)
- United States (8)
- Uruguay (8)
- Yugoslavia (9)

(*) NOTE: There are only players counted, which participated in one game at least.

Not all reserve players are known.

== Summary ==
Place	Nation
1	Italy
	Coach: Pino Valle reserve players Luigi Fabiano; Alfredo Toribolo
2	Hungary
	Jenő Brandi (Vasas Budapest); Oszkár Csuvik (MTK); Dezső Fábián (FTC); Dezső Gyarmati (UTE); Endre Győrfi (MAFC); Miklós Holop (MAFC); László Jeney (Vasas Budapest); Dezső Lemhényi (UTE); Károly Szittya (UTE); István Szívós (MTK) Pál Pók (Egri Szakszervezeti TK)
3	Netherlands
	Coach: Frans Kuypers reserve players Joop Cabout; Theo Smael
4	Belgium Henri De Pauw; Théo-Léo De Smet; Émile D'Hooge; Fernand Isselé; Georges Leenheere; Alphonse Martin; Paul Rigaumont; Willy Simons
5	Sweden Folke Eriksson (Västerås SS); Knut Gadd (IF Elfsborg); Erik Holm (SoIK Hellas); Olle Johansson (IF Elfsborg); Åke Julin (Stockholms KK); Rolf Julin (Stockholms KK); Arne Jutner (SoIK Hellas); Rune Öberg (SoIK Hellas); Olle Ohlson (SoIK Hellas); Roland Spångberg (SoIK Hellas)
6	France François Débonnet; Maurice Lefèbvre; Roger Le Bras; Marco Diener; Robert Himgi; Roger Dewasch; Jacques Berthe; René Massol; Jacques Viaene; Émile Bermyn; Marcel Spilliaert
7	Egypt Ahmed Fouad Nessim; Taha El-Gamal; Mohamed Khadry; Mohamed Haraga; Dorri Abdel Kader; Abdel Aziz Khalifa; Samir Gharbo; Mohamed Hemmat
8	Spain Coach: Bandy Zolyomy; Juan Serra; José Pujol; Carlos Falt; Carlos Martí; Francisco Castillo; Agustín Mestres; Valentín Sabate; Angel Sabata Federico Salvadores
9	Yugoslavia Juraj Amšel; Veljko Bakašun; Marko Brainović; Luka Ciganović; Ivo Giovanelli; Božo Grkinić; Zdravko Kovačić; Ivica Kurtini; Ivo Štakula Željko Radić; Saša Strmac
10	Argentina Osvaldo Codaro; Anibál Filiberti; Rubén Maidana; Hugo Prono; Ladislao Szabo; Marcelo Visentín; Carlos Visentín Luis Díez; Ladislao Fijaldauskas; Mario Sebastián; Francisco Trimboli
11	United States Kenneth Beck; Bob Bray; Ralph Budelman; Lee Case; Devere Christensen; Harold Dash; Dixon Fiske; Edwin Knox John Miller; Donald Tierney; Frank Walton
12	India Gora Seal; Samarandra Chatterjee; Ajoy Chatterjee; Suhas Chatterjee; Dwarkadas Murarji; Durga Das; Janini Dass; Sachin Nag; Isaac Mansoor; Jahan Ahir
13	Great Britain Charles Brand; Roy Garforth; Robert Gentleman; Peter Hardie; Ian Johnson; Trevor Lewis; David Murray; Reg Potter John Jones; Robert Mitchell; G. F. Weber
14	Switzerland André Grosjean; Edouard Hauser; Georges Hauser; Heinrich Keller; Erwin Klumpp; Tristan Sauer; René Weibel
15	Greece Alexandros Monastiriotis; Ioannis Papstefanou; Dimitrios Zografos; Panagiotis Provatopoulos; Dimosthenis Stambolis; Emmanouil Papadopoulos; Nikolaos Melanofeidis; Rikhardos Brousalis
16	Uruguay Enrique Pereira; Julio López; Julio César Costemalle; Leonel Gabriel; Juan Bucetta; Osvaldo Mariño; Ramón Abella; Raúl Castro
17	Chile Teodoro Salah; Luis Aguirrebeña; Isaac Froimovich; Pedro Aguirrebeña; A. Hurtado; José Salah; Svante Törnvall; O. Martínez
18	Australia Arthur Burge; Roger Cornforth; Benjamin Dalley; Herman Doerner; Jack Ferguson; Leon Ferguson; Colin French; Eric Johnston; Jack King; Les McKay

== Sources ==
- PDF documents in the LA84 Foundation Digital Library:
  - Official Report of the 1948 Olympic Games (download, archive) (pp. 537–540, 640–647)
- Water polo on the Olympedia website
  - Water polo at the 1948 Summer Olympics (men's tournament)
- Water polo on the Sports Reference website
  - Water polo at the 1948 Summer Games (men's tournament) (archived)
