= Australia at the 1948 Summer Olympics =

- IOC code: AUS
- NOC: Australian Olympic Federation

in London
- Competitors: 75 (66 men, 9 women) in 11 sports
- Flag bearer: Les McKay (water polo)
- Medals Ranked 14th: Gold 2 Silver 6 Bronze 5 Total 13

Summer Olympics appearances (overview)
- 1896; 1900; 1904; 1908; 1912; 1920; 1924; 1928; 1932; 1936; 1948; 1952; 1956; 1960; 1964; 1968; 1972; 1976; 1980; 1984; 1988; 1992; 1996; 2000; 2004; 2008; 2012; 2016; 2020; 2024; 2028

Other related appearances
- 1906 Intercalated Games –––– Australasia (1908–1912)

Australia competed at the 1948 Summer Olympics in London, England. 75 competitors, 66 men and 9 women, took part in 52 events in 11 sports. Australian athletes have competed in every Summer Olympic Games.

== Medalists ==
Medal	Name	Sport	Event	Date
Gold	John Winter	Athletics	High Jump	30 July
Gold	Mervyn Wood	Rowing	Single sculls	9 August
Silver	Theo Bruce	Athletics	Long Jump	31 July
Silver	George Avery	Athletics	Triple Jump	3 August
Silver	Joyce King; June Maston; Betty McKinnon; Shirley Strickland	Athletics	4 × 100 m relay	7 August
Silver	John Marshall	Swimming	1500m freestyle	7 August
Silver	Beatrice Lyons	Swimming	200m breaststroke	3 August
Silver	Dick Garrard	Wrestling	Welterweight	31 July
Bronze	Shirley Strickland	Athletics	100m	2 August
Bronze	Shirley Strickland	Athletics	80m hurdles	4 August
Bronze	John Marshall	Swimming	400m freestyle	4 August
Bronze	Judy-Joy Davies	Swimming	100m backstroke	5 August
Bronze	Jim Armstrong	Wrestling	Heavyweight	31 July

== Athletics ==
Key

- Note–Ranks given for track events are within the athlete's heat only
- Q = Qualified for the next round
- q = Qualified for the next round as a fastest loser or, in field events, by position without achieving the qualifying target
- NR = National record
- N/A = Round not applicable for the event
- Bye = Athlete not required to compete in round
- NP = Not placed

Men
Track & road events

Athlete	Event	Heat		Quarterfinal		Semifinal		Final	
Athlete	Event	Result	Rank	Result	Rank	Result	Rank	Result	Rank
John Bartram	100 m	10.8	2 Q	10.6	3 Q		4	did not advance	
John Treloar	100 m	10.5	1 Q	10.5	2 Q		4	did not advance	
Morris Curotta	100 m	10.7	1 Q	10.8	3 Q		6	did not advance	
John Treloar	200 m	21.7	1 Q	21.5	2 Q		6	did not advance	
Morris Curotta	400 m	49.1	1 Q	48.4	2 Q	47.2	2 Q	47.9	5
John Bartram	400 m	50.8	2 Q	49.9	4	did not advance			
Bill Ramsey	400 m	50.3	5	did not advance					
Bill Ramsey	800 m	1:55.0	3 Q	—N/a		1:54.9	5	did not advance	
Peter Gardner	110 m hurdles	14.6	2 Q	—N/a		14.5	2 Q	14.7	5
Ray Weinberg	110 m hurdles	15.0	2 Q	—N/a			5	did not advance	
Charles Green	110 m hurdles	15.4	5	—N/a		did not advance			
George Knott	10 km walk		7	—N/a				did not advance	
Theo Bruce; John Bartram; Morris Curotta; John Treloar	4 × 100 m relay	41.5	3	—N/a				did not advance	

Men
Field Events

Athlete	Event	Qualification		Final	
Athlete	Event	Distance	Position	Distance	Position
Theo Bruce	Long Jump	7.22	4 Q	7.55	2nd place, silver medalist(s)
John Winter	High Jump	1.87	Q	1.98	1st place, gold medalist(s)
George Avery	Triple Jump	15.33	1 Q	15.36	2nd place, silver medalist(s)
Les McKeand	Triple Jump	14.55	11 Q	14.53	7

Combined events – Decathlon

Athlete	Event	100 m	LJ	SP	HJ	400 m	110H	DT	PV	JT	1500 m	Final	Rank
Peter Mullins	Result	11.2	6.64	12.75	1.83	53.2	15.2	33.94	3.40	51.32	5:17.6	6739	6
Peter Mullins	Points	787	711	691	822	706	896	541	652	612	321	6739	6

Women
Track & road events

Athlete	Event	Heat		Semifinal		Final	
Athlete	Event	Result	Rank	Result	Rank	Result	Rank
Shirley Strickland	100 m	12.4	1 Q	12.4	2 Q	12.2	3rd place, bronze medalist(s)
Joyce King	100 m	13.1	4	did not advance			
Betty McKinnon	100 m	12.7	3	did not advance			
Shirley Strickland	200 m	25.8	2 Q	24.9	1 Q	25.3	4
Joyce King	200 m	25.9	1 Q		6	did not advance	
Betty McKinnon	200 m	25.9	1 Q		7	did not advance	
Shirley Strickland	80 m Hurdles	11.9	2 Q	11.7	1 Q	11.4	3rd place, bronze medalist(s)
Shirley Strickland; June Maston; Betty McKinnon; Joyce King	4 × 100 m relay	48.0	2 Q	—N/a		47.6	2nd place, silver medalist(s)

Women
Field events

Athlete	Event	Qualification		Final	
Athlete	Event	Distance	Position	Distance	Position
Judy Canty	long jump	5.29	11 Q	5.38	7
June Maston	long jump	5.06	22	did not advance	

== Boxing ==
Athlete	Event	Round of 32	Round of 16	Quarterfinals	Semifinals	Final	
Athlete	Event	Opposition Result	Opposition Result	Opposition Result	Opposition Result	Opposition Result	Rank
Ronald Gower	Flyweight	Bondi (HUN); W PTS	Martinez (ESP); L PTS	did not advance			
Jimmy Carruthers	Bantamweight	Daigle (CAN); W DQ2	Parés (ARG); W PTS	Csik (HUN); L W/O	did not advance		
Laurie Birks	Featherweight	Tammelin (FIN); W PTS	Seo B (KOR); L KO2	did not advance			
Billy Barber	Lightweight	Vissers (BEL); L PTS	did not advance				
Billy Boyce	Welterweight	Bye	Roller (LUX); W PTS	Du Preez (RSA); L PTS	did not advance		
Graham Higham	Middleweight	Garcia (ARG); L PTS	did not advance				
Adrian Holmes	Light heavyweight	bye	El-Minabawi (EGY); W KO2	O'Hagan (IRL); W PTS	Scott (GBR); L PTS	3rd/4th place Cia (ARG); L RSC-3	4

== Cycling ==
Six cyclists, all men, represented Australia in 1948.

Road races

Individual times added together for team race, 3 times needed for team event.

Cyclist	Event	Final	
Cyclist	Event	Result	Rank
Jack Hoobin	Road race	5:18:18.2	7
Russell Mockridge	Road race	5:39:54.6	26
Ken Caves	Road race	did not finish	
Jim Nestor	Road race	did not finish	
Jack Hoobin; Russell Mockridge; Ken Caves; Jim Nestor	Team road race	did not finish	

Track

Ranks given are within the heat.

Cyclist	Event	First round		First repechage		Quarterfinals		Second repechage		Semifinals		Final	
Cyclist	Event	Result	Rank	Result	Rank	Result	Rank	Result	Rank	Result	Rank	Result	Rank
Charlie Bazzano	Sprint		2	14.1	1 Q	14.3	1 Q	Directly advanced			2		4
Sid Patterson	Time trial	n/a										1:15.7	6
Sid Patterson; Jim Nestor; Jack Hoobin; Russell Mockridge	Team pursuit	5:06.5	2 q	n/a		5:07.7	2	did not advance					

== Diving ==
Diver	Event	Final	
Diver	Event	Result	Rank
David Norris	3m springboard	109.67	16

== Rowing ==
Australia had eight male rowers participate in three out of seven rowing events in 1948.

Ranks given are within the heat.

Rower	Event	First round		Repechage		Semifinals		Final	
Rower	Event	Result	Rank	Result	Rank	Result	Rank	Result	Rank
Merv Wood	Single sculls	7:25.9	1 Q	n/a		8:08.5	1 Q	7:24.4	1st place, gold medalist(s)
Spencer Grace; Ted Bromley	Coxless pair	7:26.8	2 r	7:28.4	1 Q	7:54.5	2	did not advance	
Wal Lambert; Hugh Lambie; Colin Douglas-Smith; Jack Webster; Tom Darcy	Coxed four	7:04.3	2 r	7:07.1	2	did not advance			

== Sailing ==
Rank	Helmsman	Crew	Class	Race I		Race II		Race III		Race IV		Race V		Race VI		Race VII		Total Points	Total -1
Rank	Helmsman	Crew	Class	Rank	Points	Rank	Points	Rank	Points	Rank	Points	Rank	Points	Rank	Points	Rank	Points	Total Points	Total -1
18	Robert French		Firefly	18	168	11	382	~~19~~	~~144~~	16	219	9	469	12	344	10	423	2149	2005
7	Jock Sturrock	Leslie A. Fenton	Star	~~DNF~~	~~0~~	4	729	15	155	6	553	10	331	4	729	1	1331	3828	3828

== Shooting ==
Shooter	Event	Final	
Shooter	Event	Score	Rank
Reginald Parker	300 m rifle 3 positions	926	30
Mill Menghini	300 m rifle 3 positions	856	32
John Wise	300 m rifle 3 positions	852	33
Claude Platt	50 m rifle, prone	584	46
Neville Holt	50 m rifle, prone	584	47
Leo Dove	50 m rifle, prone	578	55

== Swimming ==
Ranks given are within the heat.

Men

Swimmer	Event	Heats		Semifinals		Final	
Swimmer	Event	Result	Rank	Result	Rank	Result	Rank
Bruce Bourke	100 m freestyle	59.1	2 Q	1:00.0	5	did not advance	
Warren Boyd	100 m freestyle	1:00.4	3 q	1:01.1	8	did not advance	
Bruce Bourke	100 m backstroke	1:11.3	1 Q	1:11.4	8	did not advance	
John Davies	200 m breaststroke	2:48.3	2 Q	2:44.8	4 Q	2:43.7	4
Kevin Hallett	200 m breaststroke	3:02.0	7	did not advance			
John Marshall	400 m freestyle	4:51.4	2 Q	4:50.0	2 Q	4:47.4	3rd place, bronze medalist(s)
Garrick Agnew	400 m freestyle	5:06.1	4	did not advance			
John Marshall	1500 m freestyle	20:01.1	1 Q	19:53.8	1 Q	19:31.3	2nd place, silver medalist(s)
Garrick Agnew	1500 m freestyle	21:40.1	6	did not advance			

Women

Swimmer	Event	Heats		Semifinals		Final	
Swimmer	Event	Result	Rank	Result	Rank	Result	Rank
Marjorie McQuade	100 m freestyle	1:08.5	3 Q	1:09.6	6	did not advance	
Denise Spencer	100 m freestyle	1:10.0	3	did not advance			
Judy-Joy Davies	100 m backstroke	1:16.4	1 Q	1:17.8	2 Q	1:16.7	3rd place, bronze medalist(s)
Nancy Lyons	200 m breaststroke	3:02.9	1 Q	3:00.9	1 Q	2:57.7	2nd place, silver medalist(s)
Denise Spencer	400 m freestyle	5:40.9	4 Q	5:35.6	6	did not advance	

== Water polo ==
This was the first time Australia had entered the water polo competition.

Men's Team Competition

Head coach:

No.	Pos.	Player	DoB	Age	Caps	Club	Tournament games	Tournament goals
		Ben Dalley	15 March 1916	32	?	(Australia) Balmain Water Polo Club	2	?
		Jack King	23 August 1910	37	?		1	?
		Eric Johnston	24 February 1914	34	?	(Australia) Balmain Water Polo Club	2	?
		Les McKay	27 May 1917	31	?		1	?
		Leon Ferguson	19 June 1923	25	?	(Australia) Bondi ASC	1	?
		Arthur Burge	24 August 1917	31	?	(Australia) Drummoyne Water Polo Club	2	?
		Herman Doerner	1914		?	(Australia) Bondi ASC	2	?
		Colin French	20 November 1916	31	?		1	?
		Roger Cornforth	19 January 1919	29	?		1	?
		Jack Ferguson	12 April 1922	26	?	(Australia) Bondi ASC	1	?

Group D

Rank	Team	Pld	W	D	L	GF	GA	Pts	(Italy)	(Socialist Federal Republic of Yugoslavia)	(Australia)
1.	Italy	2	1	1	0	13	4	3	X	4:4	9:0
2.	Yugoslavia	2	1	1	0	16	7	3	4:4	X	12:3
3.	Australia	2	0	0	2	3	21	0	0:9	3:12	X

== Weightlifting ==
Lifter	Event	Final	
Lifter	Event	Kg	Rank
Keith Caple	Bantamweight	272.5	9
Ray Magee	Heavyweight	357.5	12

== Wrestling ==
Men's Freestyle

Athlete	Event	Round 1	Round 2	Round 3	Round 4	Round 5	Round 6	Final / BM	
Athlete	Event	Opposition Result	Opposition Result	Opposition Result	Opposition Result	Opposition Result	Opposition Result	Opposition Result	Rank
Bert Harris	Flyweight	Jhadav (IND); L 0-3	Raisi (IRI); L Fall	did not advance					10
Dick Garrard	Welterweight	Angst (SUI); W 3-0	Sóvári (HUN); W 2-1	Bhargava (IND); W Fall	Leclerc (FRA); W Fall	Merrill (USA); L 1-2	Bye	Doğu (TUR); L Fall	2nd place, silver medalist(s)
Bruce Arthur	Middleweight	Candemir (TUR); L Fall	Roy (IND); W Fall	Brand (USA); L Fall	did not advance				9
Jim Armstrong	Heavyweight	Oberlander (GBR); W 3-0	Bóbis (HUN); L Fall	Hutton (USA); W Retired	Esen (TUR); W Fall	n/a		Antonsson (SWE); L Fall	3rd place, bronze medalist(s)
