= Spain at the 1948 Summer Olympics =

- IOC code: ESP
- NOC: Spanish Olympic Committee

in London
- Competitors: 65 (all men) in 11 sports
- Flag bearer: Fabián Vicente del Valle
- Medals Ranked 28th: Gold 0 Silver 1 Bronze 0 Total 1

Summer Olympics appearances (overview)
- 1900; 1904–1912; 1920; 1924; 1928; 1932; 1936; 1948; 1952; 1956; 1960; 1964; 1968; 1972; 1976; 1980; 1984; 1988; 1992; 1996; 2000; 2004; 2008; 2012; 2016; 2020; 2024

Spain competed at the 1948 Summer Olympics in London, England. The nation returned to the Summer Olympic Games after participating in the Soviet-led boycott of the 1936 Summer Olympics. 65 competitors, all men, took part in 37 events in 11 sports.

== Medalists ==
=== Silver ===
- Jaime García, Marcelino Gavilán, and José Navarro – Equestrian, Jumping Team Competition

== Modern pentathlon ==
Three male pentathletes represented Spain in 1948.

- Alberto Moreiras
- José Luis Riera
- Manuel Bernabeu

== Rowing ==
Spain had one male rowers participate in one out of seven rowing events in 1948.

Men's single sculls

- Juan Omedes

== Shooting ==
Six shooters represented Spain in 1948.

Men

| Athlete | Event | Final | |
| Athlete | Event | Points | Rank |
|---|---|---|---|
| José Manuel Andoin | 50 metre rifle | 571 | 64 |
| Pelegrín Esteve | 25 m rapid fire pistol | 447 | 58 |
| Ángel León | 50 m pistol | 534 | 6 |
| Luis Palomo | 50 m pistol | 501 | 38 |
| Luis Palomo | 25 m rapid fire pistol | 546 | 17 |
| José Alonso | 25 m rapid fire pistol | 500 | 46 |
| Cristóbal Tauler | 50 metre rifle | 572 | 62 |

== Swimming ==
Men

| Athlete | Event | Heat | | Semifinal | | Final | |
| Athlete | Event | Time | Rank | Time | Rank | Time | Rank |
|---|---|---|---|---|---|---|---|
| Jesús Domínguez | 100 m freestyle | 1:01.3 | 3* | Did not advance | | | |
| Manuel Guerra | 100 m freestyle | 1:00.7 | 4* | Did not advance | | | |
| Isidoro Pérez | 100 m freestyle | 1:04.0 | 6* | Did not advance | | | |
| Alejandro Febrero | 400 m freestyle | 5:16.9 | 30 | Did not advance | | | |
| Isidoro Martínez-Vela | 400 m freestyle | 5:10.0 | 25 | Did not advance | | | |
| Isidoro Pérez | 400 m freestyle | 5:16.1 | 28 | Did not advance | | | |
| Jesús Domínguez | 1500 m freestyle | 21:33.5 | 32 | Did not advance | | | |
| Alejandro Febrero | 1500 m freestyle | 21:15.9 | 26 | Did not advance | | | |
| Isidoro Martínez-Vela | 1500 m freestyle | 21:13.7 | 24 | Did not advance | | | |
| Francisco Calamita | 100 m backstroke | 1:14.2 | 4* | Did not advance | | | |
| Manuel Guerra | 100 m backstroke | 1:14.8 | 6* | Did not advance | | | |
| Jesús Domínguez; Manuel Guerra; Isidoro Martínez-Vela; Isidoro Pérez | 100 m backstroke | 9:28.3 | 5* | —N/a | | Did not advance | |

*Ranks given are within the heat.

== Water polo ==
Spain finished in 8th place.

- Coach: Bandy Zolyomy
- Juan Serra
- José Pujol
- Carlos Falt
- Carlos Martí
- Francisco Castillo
- Agustín Mestres
- Valentín Sabate
- Angel Sabata
- Federico Salvadores (reserve)
