= Hungary at the 1948 Summer Olympics =

- IOC code: HUN
- NOC: Hungarian Olympic Committee

in London, United Kingdom July 29-August 14, 1948
- Competitors: 128 (107 men and 21 women) in 15 sports
- Flag bearer: Imre Németh
- Medals Ranked 4th: Gold 10 Silver 5 Bronze 12 Total 27

Summer Olympics appearances (overview)
- 1896; 1900; 1904; 1908; 1912; 1920; 1924; 1928; 1932; 1936; 1948; 1952; 1956; 1960; 1964; 1968; 1972; 1976; 1980; 1984; 1988; 1992; 1996; 2000; 2004; 2008; 2012; 2016; 2020; 2024; 2028

Other related appearances
- 1906 Intercalated Games

Hungary competed at the 1948 Summer Olympics in Wembley Park, London, England. 128 competitors, 107 men and 21 women, took part in 76 events in 15 sports.

== Medalists ==
Medal	Name	Sport	Event	Date
Gold	Gyula Bóbis	Wrestling	Men's freestyle heavyweight	31 July
Gold	Imre Németh	Athletics	Men's hammer throw	31 July
Gold	Ilona Elek-Schacherer	Fencing	Women's foil	2 August
Gold	Károly Takács	Shooting	Men's 25 metre rapid fire pistol	4 August
Gold	Olga Gyarmati	Athletics	Women's long jump	4 August
Gold	Aladár Gerevich; Tibor Berczelly; Rudolf Kárpáti; Pál Kovács; László Rajcsányi; Bertalan Papp	Fencing	Men's team sabre	11 August
Gold	Tibor Csík	Boxing	Men's bantamweight	13 August
Gold	László Papp	Boxing	Men's middleweight	13 August
Gold	Ferenc Pataki	Gymnastics	Men's floor	13 August
Gold	Aladár Gerevich	Fencing	Men's sabre	13 August
Silver	Elemér Szathmáry; György Mitró; Imre Nyéki; Géza Kádas	Swimming	Men's 4 × 200 metre freestyle relay	3 August
Silver	Miklós Szilvási	Wrestling	Men's Greco-Roman welterweight	6 August
Silver	Hungary men's national water polo team: Jenő Brandi; Oszkár Csuvik; Dezső Fábián; Dezső Gyarmati; Endre Győrfi; Miklós Holop; László Jeney; Dezső Lemhényi; Károly Szittya; István Szívós	Water polo	Men's tournament	7 August
Silver	János Mogyorósi-Klencs	Gymnastics	Men's floor	13 August
Silver	Edit Perényi-Weckinger; Mária Zalai-Kövi; Irén Daruházi-Karcsics; Erzsébet Gulyás-Köteles; Erzsébet Balázs; Olga Tass; Anna Fehér; Margit Nagy-Sándor	Gymnastics	Women's artistic team all-around	14 August
Bronze	Géza Kádas	Swimming	Men's 100 metre freestyle	31 July
Bronze	Éva Novák-Gerard	Swimming	Women's 200 metre breaststroke	3 August
Bronze	József Várszegi	Athletics	Men's javelin throw	4 August
Bronze	Lajos Maszlay	Fencing	Men's foil	4 August
Bronze	Ferenc Tóth	Wrestling	Men's Greco-Roman featherweight	6 August
Bronze	Károly Ferencz	Wrestling	Men's Greco-Roman lightweight	6 August
Bronze	György Mitró	Swimming	Men's 1500 metre freestyle	7 August
Bronze	Antal Szendey; Béla Zsitnik; Róbert Zimonyi	Rowing	Men's coxed pair	9 August
Bronze	Ferenc Pataki	Gymnastics	Men's vault	13 August
Bronze	János Mogyorósi-Klencs	Gymnastics	Men's vault	13 August
Bronze	Pál Kovács	Fencing	Men's sabre	13 August
Bronze	Lajos Tóth; Lajos Sántha; László Baranyai; Ferenc Pataki; János Mogyorósi-Klencs; Ferenc Várkõi; József Fekete; Győző Mogyorossy	Gymnastics	Men's artistic team all-around	13 August

Default sort order: Medal, Date, Name

Medals by sport
Sport	1st place, gold medalist(s)	2nd place, silver medalist(s)	3rd place, bronze medalist(s)	Total
Fencing	3	0	2	5
Athletics	2	0	1	3
Boxing	2	0	0	2
Gymnastics	1	2	3	6
Wrestling	1	1	2	4
Shooting	1	0	0	1
Swimming	0	1	3	4
Water polo	0	1	0	1
Rowing	0	0	1	1
Total	10	5	12	27

Medals by gender
Gender	1st place, gold medalist(s)	2nd place, silver medalist(s)	3rd place, bronze medalist(s)	Total
Male	8	4	11	23
Female	2	1	1	4
Total	10	5	12	27

=== Multiple medalists ===
The following competitors won multiple medals at the 1948 Olympic Games.

Name	Medal	Sport	Event
Aladár Gerevich	Gold; Gold	Fencing	Men's team sabre Men's sabre
Ferenc Pataki	Gold; Bronze; Bronze	Gymnastics	Men's floor Men's artistic individual all-around Men's vault
Pál Kovács	Gold; Bronze	Fencing	Men's team sabre Men's sabre
János Mogyorósi-Klencs	Silver; Bronze; Bronze	Gymnastics	Men's floor Men's artistic individual all-around Men's vault
Géza Kádas	Silver; Bronze	Swimming	Men's 4×200 m freestyle relay Men's 100 m freestyle
György Mitró	Silver; Bronze	Swimming	Men's 4×200 m freestyle relay Men's 1500 m freestyle

== Diving ==
Women

Athlete	Event	Final	
Athlete	Event	Points	Rank
Irén Zságot	10 m platform	56.62	9

== Fencing ==
18 fencers, 15 men and 3 women, represented Hungary in 1948.

Men's foil

- Lajos Maszlay
- Endre Palócz
- József Hátszeghy

Men's team foil

- Béla Bay, Aladár Gerevich, József Hátszeghy, Lajos Maszlay, Pál Dunay, Endre Palócz

Men's épée

- Pál Dunay
- Imre Hennyei
- Béla Mikla

Men's team épée

- Imre Hennyei, Pál Dunay, Béla Rerrich, Béla Mikla, Lajos Balthazár, Béla Bay

Men's sabre

- Aladár Gerevich
- Pál Kovács
- Tibor Berczelly

Men's team sabre

- Aladár Gerevich, Tibor Berczelly, Rudolf Kárpáti, Pál Kovács, László Rajcsányi, Bertalan Papp

Women's foil

- Ilona Elek-Schacherer
- Margit Elek
- Éva Kun

== Modern pentathlon ==
Three male pentathletes represented Hungary in 1948.

- Frigyes Hegedűs
- István Szondy
- László Karácson

== Rowing ==
Hungary had nine male rowers participate in four out of seven rowing events in 1948.

Men's double sculls

- Sándor Ormándi
- József Simó

Men's coxed pair

- Antal Szendey
- Béla Zsitnik
- Róbert Zimonyi (cox)

Men's coxless four

- Miklós Zágon
- Lajos Nagy
- Tibor Nádas
- József Sátori

Men's coxed four

- Miklós Zágon
- Lajos Nagy
- József Sátori
- Tibor Nádas
- Róbert Zimonyi (cox)

== Shooting ==
Four shooters represented Hungary in 1948. Károly Takács won a gold medal in the 25 metre pistol event.

25 metre pistol

- Károly Takács
- Lajos Börzsönyi
- Ambrus Balogh

50 metre pistol

- Ambrus Balogh
- Lajos Börzsönyi
- Sándor Tölgyesi

== Swimming ==
Men

Athlete	Event	Heat		Semifinal		Final	
Athlete	Event	Time	Rank	Time	Rank	Time	Rank
Géza Kádas	100 m freestyle	58.2	1 Q*	58.0	3 Q*	58.1	3rd place, bronze medalist(s)
Elemér Szathmáry	100 m freestyle	59.7	3 q*	1:00.5	6	Did not advance	
Zoltán Szilárd	100 m freestyle	59.8	3 q*	59.6	3 Q*	59.6	7
Géza Kádas	400 m freestyle	4:52.8	4 Q	4:47.8	1 Q	4:49.4	4
György Mitró	400 m freestyle	4:56.0	9 Q	4:50.8	5 q	4:49.9	5
Imre Nyéki	400 m freestyle	5:01.8	16 Q	DNS		Did not advance	
György Csordás	1500 m freestyle	20:06.8	2 Q	20:06.6	4 Q	19:54.2	4
György Mitró	1500 m freestyle	20:15.0	5 Q	20:06.5	3 Q	19:43.2	3rd place, bronze medalist(s)
Ferenc Vörös	1500 m freestyle	20:31.9	12 Q	20:31.4	10	Did not advance	
Gyula Válent	100 m backstroke	1:11.8	5*	Did not advance			
Sándor Németh	200 m breaststroke	2:48.2	7	2:48.1	9	Did not advance	
Elemér Szathmáry; György Mitró; Imre Nyéki; Géza Kádas	4 × 200 m freestyle relay	8:53.6	1 Q*	—N/a		8:48.4	2nd place, silver medalist(s)

*Ranks given are within the heat.

Women

Athlete	Event	Heat		Semifinal		Final	
Athlete	Event	Time	Rank	Time	Rank	Time	Rank
Mária Littomeritzky	100 m freestyle	1:13.0	26	Did not advance			
Zsuzsa Nádor	100 m freestyle	1:15.8	31	Did not advance			
Judit Temes	100 m freestyle	1:08.3	7 Q	1:09.7	15	Did not advance	
Ilona Novák	100 m backstroke	1:17.3	4 Q	1:17.6	3 Q	1:18.4	4
Éva Novák-Gerard	200 m breaststroke	3:02.9	=1 Q*	2:58.0	2 Q*	3:00.2	3rd place, bronze medalist(s)
Éva Székely	200 m breaststroke	3:01.2 OR	1 Q*	3:02.8	3 Q*	3:02.5	4
Mária Littomeritzky; Ilona Novák; Judit Temes; Éva Székely	4 × 100 m freestyle relay	4:47.5	3 Q*	—N/a		4:48.8	5

*Ranks given are within the heat.
