= Grosjean =

Grosjean (French pronunciation: [ɡʁoʒɑ̃]) is a surname of French or Belgian origin from the adjective gros (large) and the forename Jean. As gros-jean, it is sometimes applied in French to a person who is perceived as stupid.

== People ==
- Alice Lee Grosjean, Secretary of State of Louisiana and confidante of 20th-century Louisiana politician Huey Long
- André Grosjean, Swiss water polo player at the 1948 Olympics
- Bruno Grosjean, a possible real name for purported Swiss Holocaust survivor Binjamin Wilkomirski
- Catherine Grosjean (born 1947), French Olympic swimmer
- Ernest Grosjean (1844–1936), French composer and organist
- Fernand Grosjean (1924–2015), Swiss Olympic alpine skier
- François Grosjean, French psycholinguist and researcher on bilingualism
- Georges Grosjean, Belgian field hockey player at the 1928 Olympics
- James Grosjean, American gambler and author
- Jean Grosjean (1912–2006), French poet, writer and translator
- Joris Grosjean (born 1993), French badminton player
- Marion Jollès Grosjean (born 1981), French journalist and television presenter
- Matthew Grosjean, American alpine skier
- Roger Grosjean (1920–1975), French archeologist especially interested in the prehistory of Corsica
- Romain Grosjean, Franco-Swiss racing driver
- Sébastien Grosjean, French tennis player
- Sylvain Grosjean (born 1990), French badminton player

== Other uses ==
- Grosjean v. American Press Co., a US Supreme Court case
