= José Alonso =

José Alonso may refer to:

- José Alonso (hurdler) (born 1957), Spanish athlete
- José Alonso (actor) (born 1947), Mexican actor
- José Alonso (sport shooter) (1919–1988), Spanish sport shooter
- José Alonso (trade unionist) (1917–1970), Argentine trade-unionist
- José María Alonso (1890–1979), Spanish tennis player
- José Antonio Alonso (1960–2017), Spanish Socialist Workers' Party (PSOE) politician
- José Ángel Alonso (born 1989), Spanish footballer
