= John Layton (disambiguation) =

John Layton (born 1951) is a former English footballer and coach.

John Layton may also refer to:

- John Layton Sr. (died 2000), English footballer, made 549 competitive appearances for Hereford, John Layton's father
- Jack Layton (John Gilbert Leyton, 1950–2011), Canadian politician, leader of New Democratic Party in 2003–2011
- John Layton (sport shooter) (1912–1989), American Olympic shooter
- John Layton (MP) for Appleby (UK Parliament constituency) in 1571

== See also ==
- John Leyton (born 1935), English actor and singer
