= Júlio López =

Júlio López may refer to:

== Sportspeople ==
- Julio López (water polo) (1922–1984), Uruguayan water polo player
- Julio López (rower) (born 1933), Spanish Olympic rower
- Júlio López (swimmer) (born 1967), Brazilian Olympic swimmer
- Julio Lopez (footballer) (born 1978), Chilean footballer
- Julio César López (born 1986), Paraguayan football goalkeeper

== Other ==
- Julio López Chávez (before 1845–1869), Mexican leader of peasant rebellion

== See also ==
- Julián López (disambiguation)
- Julia López (disambiguation)
- Jorge Julio López (1929–disappeared 2006), Argentine victim of the National Reorganization Process
