= Pedro Peña =

Pedro Peña may refer to:

- Pedro Peña (politician), provisional president of Paraguay, 1912
- Pedro Peña (actor), Spanish actor
- Pedro Peña y Lillo, Chilean sports shooter
- Pedro Peña (DC Comics)
- Pedro Peña (DC Extended Universe)
