= Cadalso (surname) =

Cadalso is a surname. Notable people with the surname include:

- José Cadalso (1741–1782), Spanish army colonel, author, poet, playwright, and essayist
- Rafael Cadalso (1914–1968), Cuban sports shooter
