= Shooting at the 1948 Summer Olympics – Men's 25 metre rapid fire pistol =

Men's 25 metre rapid fire pistol at the Games of the XIV Olympiad
- Venue: National Shooting Centre
- Date: 4 August 1948
- Competitors: 59 from 22 nations
- Winning score: 580 WR

Medalists
1st place, gold medalist(s)		Károly Takács; Hungary
2nd place, silver medalist(s)		Carlos Enrique Díaz Sáenz Valiente; Argentina
3rd place, bronze medalist(s)		Sven Lundquist; Sweden

The men's ISSF 25 meter rapid fire pistol was a shooting sports event held as part of the Shooting at the 1948 Summer Olympics programme. It was the eighth appearance of the event. The competition was held on 4 August 1948 at the shooting ranges at London. 59 shooters from 22 nations competed. Nations had been limited to three shooters each since the 1932 Games. The event was won by Károly Takács of Hungary, the nation's first medal in the event. Argentine Carlos Enrique Díaz Sáenz Valiente took silver, also his nation's first rapid fire pistol medal. Unlike Hungary and Argentina, Sweden was no stranger to the podium in this event; Sven Lundquist's bronze made it the fourth consecutive time that Sweden competed it earned a medal (Sweden had not had any rapid fire pistol shooters in 1920 or 1932, however).

== Background ==
This was the eighth appearance of what had finally been standardised as the men's ISSF 25 meter rapid fire pistol event, the only event on the 2020 programme that traces back to 1896. The event has been held at every Summer Olympics except 1904 and 1928 (when no shooting events were held) and 1908; it was nominally open to women from 1968 to 1980, although very few women participated these years. There is no women's equivalent on the Olympic programme, as of 2021. The first five events were quite different, with some level of consistency finally beginning with the 1932 event—which, though it had differences from the 1924 competition, was roughly similar. The 1936 competition followed the 1932 one quite closely. The post-World War II event substantially altered the competition once again.

1936 bronze medalist, Torsten Ullman of Sweden, returned in 1948. The reigning (1947) world champion was Carlos Enrique Diaz Saenz Valiente.

Cuba, Lebanon, and Peru each made their debut in the event. The United States made its sixth appearance in the event, tied for most of any nation.

Common pistols were the Walther Olympia and the Beretta.

== Competition format ==
The competition format was almost completely different from the 1924–1936 Games, and was now very close to the modern rapid fire pistol competition. Each shooter fired 60 shots. These were done in two courses of 30; each course consisted of two stages of 15; each stage consisted of three series of 5. In each stage, the time limit for each series was 8 seconds for the first, 6 seconds for the second, and 4 seconds for the third.

A holdover from the previous Games was that full-body silhouettes, rather than round targets, continued to be used; however, scoring rings had been added so that now each shot was scored up to 10 rather than being strictly hit or miss. Targets were 1.60 metres tall and 45 centimetres wide. As in 1912, hits were the primary measurement of success; points were only used to differentiate between shooters with the same number of hits.

The pistol had to be of .22 calibre. No telescope sights were allowed. Bullet weight could not exceed 40 grains.

== Records ==
Prior to the competition, the existing world and Olympic records were as follows.

World record				
Olympic record	New format	n/a	n/a	n/a

Károly Takács broke the world record and set the initial Olympic record for the 60-shot format with a score of 580.

== Schedule ==
Date	Time	Round
Wednesday, 4 August 1948	8:00	Final

== Results ==
Rank	Shooter	Nation	Hits	Score
1st place, gold medalist(s)	Károly Takács	Hungary	60	580
2nd place, silver medalist(s)	Carlos Enrique Díaz Sáenz Valiente	Argentina	60	571
3rd place, bronze medalist(s)	Sven Lundquist	Sweden	60	569
4	Torsten Ullman	Sweden	60	564
5	Leo Ravilo	Finland	60	563
6	Väinö Heusala	Finland	60	563
7	Lajos Börzsönyi	Hungary	60	562
8	Birger Bühring-Andersen	Norway	60	559
9	Michelangelo Borriello	Italy	60	557
10	Charles des Jammonières	France	60	555
11	Konstantinos Mylonas	Greece	60	554
12	Charles Willott	Great Britain	60	554
13	Bob Chow	United States	60	553
14	Ernesto Montemayor, Sr.	Mexico	60	550
15	Walter Boninsegni	Italy	60	549
16	Odd Bonde Nielsen	Norway	60	546
17	Luis Palomo	Spain	60	546
18	Francisco Bustamente	Mexico	60	539
19	Hernando Hernández	Cuba	60	532
20	Rudolf Schnyder	Switzerland	60	531
21	Roberto Müller	Chile	60	528
22	José Maria Ferreira	Portugal	60	524
23	Philip Roettinger	United States	59	554
24	Claes Egnell	Sweden	59	548
25	John Layton	United States	59	548
26	Rafael Cadalso	Cuba	59	548
27	Henry Steele	Great Britain	59	545
28	Hans Aasnæs	Norway	59	544
29	Jaakko Rintanen	Finland	59	543
30	Pedro Simão	Brazil	59	540
31	Axel Lerche	Denmark	59	540
32	R. Bouillet	France	59	534
33	D. Hesse	France	59	533
34	Álvaro dos Santos Filho	Brazil	59	527
35	Froilán Tantaleán	Peru	59	520
36	Georgios Vikhos	Greece	59	518
37	Raúl Valderrama	Peru	59	506
38	Ambrus Balogh	Hungary	58	555
39	Henry Swire	Great Britain	58	538
40	Martin Gison	Philippines	58	530
41	Charles Villholth	Denmark	58	523
42	Ignacio Cruzat	Chile	58	496
43	Carlos Rodríguez-Feo	Cuba	57	533
44	José Alanís	Mexico	57	529
45	José Roger	Argentina	57	513
46	José Alonso	Spain	57	500
47	Pedro Peña y Lillo	Chile	57	496
48	Enrique Mendizábal	Peru	57	480
49	Ferdinando Bernini	Italy	56	528
50	Dionisio Fernández	Argentina	56	511
51	Gregers Münter	Denmark	56	498
52	Paulus Kessels	Netherlands	56	479
53	Vangelis Khrysafis	Greece	55	511
54	Carlos Queiroz	Portugal	55	489
55	Moysés Cardoso	Portugal	55	464
56	Allan Sobocinski	Brazil	54	490
57	Khalil Hilmi	Lebanon	53	423
58	Pelegrín Esteve	Spain	52	447
59	Walter Lienhard	Switzerland	50	416
