= List of flag bearers for Australia at the Olympics =

Australia at the Olympics
- IOC code: AUS
- NOC: Australian Olympic Committee
- Website: www.olympics.com.au
- Medals: Gold 188 Silver 199 Bronze 232 Total 619

Summer appearances
- 1896; 1900; 1904; 1908; 1912; 1920; 1924; 1928; 1932; 1936; 1948; 1952; 1956; 1960; 1964; 1968; 1972; 1976; 1980; 1984; 1988; 1992; 1996; 2000; 2004; 2008; 2012; 2016; 2020; 2024; 2028

Winter appearances
- 1936; 1948; 1952; 1956; 1960; 1964; 1968; 1972; 1976; 1980; 1984; 1988; 1992; 1994; 1998; 2002; 2006; 2010; 2014; 2018; 2022; 2026

Other related appearances
- 1906 Intercalated Games –––– Australasia (1908–1912)

This is a list of flag bearers who have represented Australia at the Olympics.

Flag bearers carry the national flag of their country at the opening ceremony and closing ceremony of the Olympic Games.

== History ==
The debut of the Parade of Nations occurred during the 1908 Summer Olympics, when Australia and New Zealand were competing as Australasia. Both occasions, the flag bearers were New Zealanders. Thus, the first Australian flag bearer would not appear until George Parker in the 1920 Summer Olympics in Antwerp. Walker would also become the first Australian flag bearer to win a medal at the same Olympics, winning silver in the 3000 metre walk. The first Australian to win a gold medal while also carrying the flag at the Parade of Nations was rower Bobby Pearce in 1928.

After carrying the flag in 1952, Mervyn Wood became the first Australian to carry the flag twice, when he carried the flag at Australia's first home Olympics in Melbourne in 1956. Australia's first female flag bearer was runner Raelene Boyle in 1976. 1980 would be the first time that Australia would have two flag bearers, one female and one male, in Denise Robertson-Boyd and Max Metzker. These Olympics would be the only time that Australia would march with the Olympic flag due to the Australian government's diplomatic boycott of the Summer Olympics being held in the Soviet Union.

Winter Olympian Colin Coates would become the second, and most recent, Australian to carry the flag at two separate Opening Ceremonies, being chosen to carry the flag in 1976 and 1984.

The lead-up to the selection of flag bearer at the 2012 Summer Olympics was surrounded by debate, led by Olympic gold medal winning beach volleyballer Natalie Cook, who called out the lack of Australian female flag bearers at previous Opening Ceremonies, with only three female flag bearers having been selected in Australian Olympic history. Cook pointed out that, in addition to the gender imbalance, the most recent female flag bearer selected for an Opening Ceremony at the time was diver Jenny Donnet, 20 years prior. Ultimately, then chef-de-mission Nick Green selected Australian women's basketball captain, and three-time Olympic silver medallist, Lauren Jackson for the role. Jackson called the honour one of the biggest of her career, stating, "Obviously a gold medal would be awesome, but I feel like this is something that will never happen again."

2020 would be historic for two reasons. For the second time in history, Australia would have two flag bearers at the same Olympics with swimmer Cate Campbell and basketballer Patty Mills. Mills would become the first Australian of Indigenous heritage to carry the flag at an Olympic ceremony.

The Winter Olympics in 2026 would feature a Parade of Nations across four different locations across Italy during the Opening Ceremony, with selected flag bearers, Jakara Anthony and Matt Graham, carrying the flag at the parade in Livigno. It was also the first time that two Winter Olympic medallists had been selected to carry the flag at an Olympic ceremony.

== Selection process ==
Traditionally, Australian Opening Ceremony flag bearers tend to be athletes with multiple Olympic appearances and are designated team leaders in their respective sports, while also exhibiting "courage" and "perseverance". The chef-de-mission of the team, currently Anna Meares and Alisa Camplin for the Summer and Winter teams respectively, selects of Australia's flag bearers.

For the Closing Ceremony, athletes are chosen are based on their performances across the Olympics, with Australia's most successful athletes at that corresponding Olympics usually selected. The lone exception to this was the 2022 Winter Olympics, with Sami Kennedy-Sim chosen to carry the flag due to COVID-19 protocol in place in Beijing, which meant all athletes had to leave 48 hours after their events, including medallists. With Kennedy-Sim being selected from a group of the ten remaining athletes who were still in Beijing, and was chosen based on her leadership and her improvement across her Olympic career. The closing ceremony flag bearers are also selected by the chef-de-mission.

== Opening Ceremony flag bearers ==
=== Summer Olympics ===
#	Games	Flag bearer/s	Sport	Ref
1	(Belgium) 1920 Antwerp	George Parker	Athletics (Walk)	
2	(France) 1924 Paris	Edwin Carr, Sr.	Athletics (Track)	
3	(Netherlands) 1928 Amsterdam	Bobby Pearce	Rowing	
4	(United States) 1932 Los Angeles	Boy Charlton	Swimming	
5	(Germany) 1936 Berlin	Dunc Gray	Cycling	
6	(United Kingdom) 1948 London	Les McKay	Water polo	
7	(Finland) 1952 Helsinki	Mervyn Wood	Rowing	
~	(Australia) 1956 Melbourne	Mervyn Wood	Rowing	
8	(Italy) 1960 Rome	Jock Sturrock	Sailing	
9	(Japan) 1964 Tokyo	Ivan Lund	Fencing	
10	1968 Mexico City	Bill Roycroft	Equestrian	
11	(West Germany) 1972 Munich	Dennis Green	Canoeing (Sprint)	
12	(Canada) 1976 Montreal	Raelene Boyle	Athletics (Track)	
13	(Soviet Union) 1980 Moscow (Note: Marched in the Opening Ceremony with the Olympic flag, due to Australia's diplomatic boycott of the Olympics in Moscow)	Denise Robertson-Boyd	Athletics (Track)	
14	(Soviet Union) 1980 Moscow	Max Metzker	Swimming	
15	(United States) 1984 Los Angeles	Wayne Roycroft	Equestrian	
16	(South Korea) 1988 Seoul	Ric Charlesworth	Field Hockey	
17	(Spain) 1992 Barcelona	Jenny Donnet	Diving	
18	(United States) 1996 Atlanta	Andrew Hoy	Equestrian	
19	(Australia) 2000 Sydney	Andrew Gaze	Basketball	
20	(Greece) 2004 Athens	Colin Beashel	Sailing	
21	(China) 2008 Beijing	James Tomkins	Rowing	
22	(United Kingdom) 2012 London	Lauren Jackson	Basketball	
23	(Brazil) 2016 Rio de Janeiro	Anna Meares	Cycling	
24	(Japan) 2020 Tokyo	Cate Campbell	Swimming	
25	(Japan) 2020 Tokyo	Patty Mills	Basketball	
26	(France) 2024 Paris	Jessica Fox	Canoeing (Slalom)	
27	(France) 2024 Paris	Eddie Ockenden	Field Hockey	

==== Flag bearers by sport ====
Number	Sport	Olympics
4	Rowing	1928, 1952, 1956, 2008
4	Athletics	1920, 1924, 1976, 1980
3	Basketball	2000, 2012, 2020
3	Swimming	1932, 1980, 2020
3	Equestrian	1968, 1984, 1996
2	Field Hockey	1988, 2024
2	Canoeing	1972, 2024
2	Cycling	1936, 2016
2	Sailing	1960, 2004
1	Diving	1992
1	Fencing	1964
1	Water polo	1948

=== Winter Olympics ===
#	Games	Flag bearer/s	Sport	Ref
1	(United States) 1960 Squaw Valley	Vic Ekberg	Ice hockey	
-	(Austria) 1964 Innsbruck	No flag bearer selected		
2	(France) 1968 Grenoble	Malcolm Milne	Alpine skiing	
3	(Austria) 1976 Innsbruck	Colin Coates	Speed skating	
4	(United States) 1980 Lake Placid	Rob McIntyre	Alpine skiing	
~	(Socialist Federal Republic of Yugoslavia) 1984 Sarajevo	Colin Coates	Speed skating	
5	(Canada) 1988 Calgary	Mike Richmond	Speed skating	
6	(France) 1992 Albertville	Danny Kah	Speed skating	
7	(Norway) 1994 Lillehammer	Kirstie Marshall	Freestyle skiing (Aerials)	
8	(Japan) 1998 Nagano	Richard Nizielski	Short track speed skating	
9	(United States) 2002 Salt Lake City	Adrian Costa	Freestyle skiing (Moguls)	
10	(Italy) 2006 Turin	Alisa Camplin	Freestyle skiing (Aerials)	
11	(Canada) 2010 Vancouver	Torah Bright	Snowboarding (Halfpipe)	
12	(Russia) 2014 Sochi	Alex Pullin	Snowboarding (Cross)	
13	(South Korea) 2018 Pyeongchang	Scotty James	Snowboarding (Halfpipe)	
14	(China) 2022 Beijing	Laura Peel	Freestyle skiing (Aerials)	
15	(China) 2022 Beijing	Brendan Kerry	Figure skating	
16	(Italy) 2026 Milano Cortina	Jakara Anthony	Freestyle skiing (Moguls)	
17	(Italy) 2026 Milano Cortina	Matt Graham	Freestyle skiing (Moguls)	

==== Flag bearers by sport ====
Number	Sport	Olympics
6	Freestyle skiing	1994, 2002, 2006, 2022, 2026 (Note: This ceremony featured two flagbearers, Jakara Anthony and Matt Graham, from the same sport)
4	Speed skating	1976, 1984, 1988, 1992
3	Snowboarding	2010, 2014, 2018
2	Alpine skiing	1968, 1980
1	Figure skating	2022
1	Short track speed skating	1998
1	Ice hockey	1960

== Closing Ceremony flag bearers ==
=== Summer Olympics ===
Games	Flag bearer/s	Sport	Ref
(Japan) 1964 Tokyo	Dawn Fraser	Swimming	
1968 Mexico City	Eric Pearce	Field Hockey	
(West Germany) 1972 Munich	Michael Wenden	Swimming	
(Canada) 1976 Montreal	Robert Haigh	Field Hockey	
(Soviet Union) 1980 Moscow	John Sumegi	Canoeing (Sprint)	
(United States) 1984 Los Angeles	Dean Lukin	Weightlifting	
(South Korea) 1988 Seoul	Debbie Flintoff-King	Athletics (Track)	
(Spain) 1992 Barcelona	Kieren Perkins	Swimming	
(United States) 1996 Atlanta	Mike McKay	Rowing	
(Australia) 2000 Sydney	Ian Thorpe	Swimming	
(Greece) 2004 Athens	Petria Thomas	Swimming	
(China) 2008 Beijing	Stephanie Rice	Swimming	
(United Kingdom) 2012 London	Malcolm Page	Sailing	
(Brazil) 2016 Rio de Janeiro	Kim Brennan	Rowing	
(Japan) 2020 Tokyo	Mat Belcher	Sailing	
(France) 2024 Paris	Kaylee McKeown	Swimming	
(France) 2024 Paris	Matthew Wearn	Sailing	

==== Flag bearers by sport ====
Number	Sport	Olympics
7	Swimming	1964, 1972, 1992, 2000, 2004, 2008, 2024
3	Sailing	2012, 2020, 2024
2	Rowing	1996, 2016
2	Field Hockey	1968, 1976
1	Weightlifting	1984
1	Athletics	1988
1	Canoeing	1980

=== Winter Olympics ===
Games	Flag bearer/s	Sport	Ref
(France) 1992 Albertville	Cameron Medhurst	Figure skating	
(United States) 2002 Salt Lake City	Steven Bradbury	Short track speed skating	
(Italy) 2006 Turin	Dale Begg-Smith	Freestyle skiing (Moguls)	
(Canada) 2010 Vancouver	Lydia Lassila	Freestyle skiing (Aerials)	
(Russia) 2014 Sochi	David Morris	Freestyle skiing (Aerials)	
(South Korea) 2018 Pyeongchang	Jarryd Hughes	Snowboarding (Cross)	
(China) 2022 Beijing	Sami Kennedy-Sim	Freestyle skiing (Cross)	
(Italy) 2026 Milano Cortina	Danielle Scott	Freestyle skiing (Aerials)	
(Italy) 2026 Milano Cortina	Cooper Woods	Freestyle skiing (Moguls)	

==== Flag bearers by sport ====
Number	Sport	Olympics
6	Freestyle skiing	2006, 2010, 2014, 2022, 2026 (Note: This ceremony featured two flagbearers, Danielle Scott and Cooper Woods, from the same sport.)
1	Snowboarding	2018
1	Short track speed skating	2002
1	Figure skating	1992

== See also ==
- Australia at the Olympics
- Australia at the Winter Olympics
