= Bucetta =

Bucetta is a surname. Notable people with the surname include:

- Juan Bucetta (1927–2017), Uruguayan water polo player
- Ramón Bucetta (1894–?), Uruguayan footballer
