= Dimosthenis Stamboulis =

Greek water polo player

Personal information
- Nationality: Greek
- Born: 20 October 1924
- Died: 16 July 2009 (aged 84)

Sport
- Sport: Water polo

Dimosthenis Stamboulis (20 October 1924 – 16 July 2009) was a Greek water polo player. He competed in the men's tournament at the 1948 Summer Olympics.
