= Isaac Froimovich =

Chilean water polo player (1918–1988)

Personal information
- Born: 21 December 1918; Valparaíso, Chile
- Died: 3 April 1988 (aged 69)

Sport
- Sport: Water polo

Isaac Froimovich (21 December 1918 – 3 April 1988) was a Chilean water polo player. He competed in the men's tournament at the 1948 Summer Olympics.
