= Charles Willott =

British sports shooter

Personal information
- Born: 2 October 1904 Chorlton-cum-Hardy, Manchester, England
- Died: 18 June 1973 (aged 68)

Sport
- Sport: Sports shooting

Charles Willott (2 October 1904 – 18 June 1973) was a British sports shooter. He competed in the 25 m pistol event at the 1948 Summer Olympics.
