= Dionisio Fernández (sport shooter) =

Argentine sports shooter (born 1921)

Personal information
- Full name: Dionisio Epifanio Rodolfo Fernández
- Born: 1921 Buenos Aires, Argentina

Sport
- Sport: Sports shooting

Dionisio Fernández (born 1921) was an Argentine sports shooter. He competed in the 25 m pistol event at the 1948 Summer Olympics.
