= Ferdinando Bernini =

Italian sport shooter (1910–1997)

Personal information
- Born: Filippo Bernini; 1 May 1910 Parma, Italy
- Died: 26 February 1997 (aged 86) Florence, Italy

Sport
- Sport: Sport shooting

Filippo "Ferdinando" Bernini (1 May 1910 – 26 February 1997) was an Italian sport shooter. He competed in the 25 m pistol event at the 1948 Summer Olympics. Bernini died on 26 February 1997, at the age of 86.
