= Émile Bermyn =

French water polo player (1920–1973)

Personal information
- Nationality: French
- Born: 14 October 1920; Tourcoing, France
- Died: 21 July 1973 (aged 52); Tourcoing, France

Sport
- Sport: Water polo

Émile Charles Fernand Bermyn (14 October 1920 – 21 July 1973) was a French water polo player. He competed in the men's tournament at the 1948 Summer Olympics.
