= Paulus Kessels =

Dutch sports shooter

Personal information
- Born: 1 February 1901 Tilburg, Netherlands
- Died: 9 May 1987 (aged 86) Tilburg, Netherlands

Sport
- Sport: Sports shooting

Paulus Kessels (1 February 1901 – 9 May 1987) was a Dutch sports shooter. He competed in the 25 m pistol event at the 1948 Summer Olympics.
