= Robert Himgi =

French water polo player (1922–2012)

Personal information
- Nationality: French
- Born: 22 August 1922
- Died: 8 November 2012 (aged 90)

Sport
- Sport: Water polo

Robert Himgi (22 August 1922 – 8 November 2012) was a French water polo player. He competed in the men's tournament at the 1948 Summer Olympics.
