= Marko Brainović =

Water polo player

Personal information
- Born: July 17, 1920 Split, Kingdom of Serbs, Croats and Slovenes
- Died: October 16, 2010 (aged 90) Vienna, Austria

Sport
- Sport: Water polo
Medal record
Representing Yugoslavia
Olympic Games
Silver medal – second place	1952 Helsinki	Team competition

Marko Brainović (17 July 1920 – 16 October 2010) was a Croat water polo player who competed for Yugoslavia in the 1948 Summer Olympics and in the 1952 Summer Olympics. He was part of the Yugoslav team that was eliminated in the second round of the 1948 Olympic tournament. He played two matches. Four years later he won the silver medal with the Yugoslav team in the 1952 tournament. He played three matches.

== See also ==
- List of Olympic medalists in water polo (men)
