= Maurice Lefèbvre (water polo) =

French water polo player (1913–1983)

Personal information
- Nationality: France
- Born: 30 October 1913 Tourcoing, France
- Died: 24 May 1983 (aged 69) Tourcoing, France

Sport
- Sport: Water polo

Senior clubs
- Years: Team
- –: EN Tourcoing (Tourcoing)
National team
- Years: Team
- ?-?: France

Maurice Lefèbvre (30 October 1913 – 24 May 1983) was a French male water polo player. He was a member of the France men's national water polo team. He competed with the team at the 1936 Summer Olympics and 1948 Summer Olympics.
