= Charles Villholth =

Danish sports shooter (1897–1959)

Personal information
- Born: 13 January 1897 Randers, Denmark
- Died: 12 January 1959 (aged 61) Roskilde, Denmark

Sport
- Sport: Sports shooting

Charles Villholth (13 January 1897 – 12 January 1959) was a Danish sports shooter. He competed in the 25 m pistol event at the 1948 Summer Olympics.
