= Jacques Berthe =

French water polo player (1926–1981)

Personal information
- Nationality: French
- Born: 20 July 1926
- Died: 19 April 1981 (aged 54)

Sport
- Sport: Water polo

Jacques Berthe (20 July 1926 – 19 April 1981) was a French water polo player. He competed in the men's tournament at the 1948 Summer Olympics.
