= José Salah =

Chilean water polo player (1920–1984)

Personal information
- Full name: Alejandro José Salah Jaque
- Born: 1 August 1920 Santiago, Chile
- Died: 22 July 1984 (aged 63) Santiago, Chile

Sport
- Sport: Water polo

Alejandro José Salah Jaque (1 August 1920 – 22 July 1984) was a Chilean water polo player. He competed in the men's tournament at the 1948 Summer Olympics. Salah died in Santiago on 22 July 1984, at the age of 63.
