= Edouard Hauser =

Swiss water polo player

Personal information
- Nationality: Swiss
- Born: 1911

Sport
- Sport: Water polo

Edouard Hauser (born 1911, date of death unknown) was a Swiss water polo player. He competed in the men's tournament at the 1948 Summer Olympics.
