= Raúl Valderrama =

Peruvian sports shooter

Personal information
- Born: 24 March 1913; Lima, Peru
- Died: 1999 (aged 85–86)

Sport
- Sport: Sports shooting

Raúl Valderrama (24 March 1913 – 1999) was a Peruvian sports shooter. He competed in the 25 m pistol event at the 1948 Summer Olympics.
