= Peter Hardie =

British water polo player

Personal information
- Nationality: British
- Born: 1921 Bradford, England
- Died: 5 May 1960 (aged 38–39) Bishopston, Swansea, Wales

Sport
- Sport: Water polo

Peter Hardie (1921 – 5 May 1960) was a British water polo player. He competed in the men's tournament at the 1948 Summer Olympics.
