= Veljko Bakašun =

Water polo player

Personal information
- Born: 14 June 1920 Split, Kingdom of Serbs, Croats and Slovenes
- Died: 17 July 2007 (aged 87) Korčula, Croatia
Medal record
Representing Yugoslavia
Olympic Games
Silver medal – second place	1952 Helsinki	Team competition

Veljko Bakašun (Вељко Бакашун, 14 June 1920 – 17 July 2007) was a Croat water polo player who competed for Yugoslavia in the 1948 Summer Olympics and in the 1952 Summer Olympics.

Bakašun was part of the Yugoslav team which was eliminated in the second round of the 1948 Olympic tournament. He played all three matches.

Four years later he won the silver medal with the Yugoslav team in the 1952 tournament. He played six matches.

== See also ==
- List of Olympic medalists in water polo (men)
