= Julián López =

Julián López may refer to:

== Sportspeople ==
- Julián López Escobar (born 1982), Spanish bullfighter
- Julián López de Lerma (born 1987), Spanish footballer
- Julián López (footballer, born 2000), Argentine footballer

== Other ==
- Julián López Martín (born 1945), Spanish bishop for Roman Catholic Diocese of León in Spain
- Julián López (comedian) (born 1978), Spanish comedian and actor
- Julián López (politician) (born 1984), Colombian politician

== See also ==
- Julien López (born 1992), footballer
- Júlio López (disambiguation)
- Julia López (disambiguation)
