= Carlos Rodríguez-Feo =

Cuban sports shooter

Personal information
- Born: 5 November 1905 Havana, Cuba
- Died: 26 January 1995 (aged 89) Miami, Florida, United States

Sport
- Sport: Sports shooting

Carlos Rodríguez-Feo (5 November 1905 – 26 January 1995) was a Cuban sports shooter. He competed in the 25 m pistol event at the 1948 Summer Olympics.
