= Gregers Münter =

Danish sports shooter (1907–1988)

- Born: Gregers Christian Münter; 18 December 1907; Copenhagen, Denmark
- Died: 31 March 1988 (aged 80); Copenhagen, Denmark
- Burial place: Vestre Cemetery, Copenhagen
- Military career
- Allegiance: Denmark
- Branch: Royal Danish Army
- Rank: Lieutenant colonel
- Conflicts: Operation Safari
- Sports career
- Country: Denmark
- Sport: Sports shooting
- Event: 25 m pistol
- League: Hellerup Skyde-Selskab

Sports achievements and titles
- Olympic finals: 1948 Summer Olympics
- Highest world ranking: 51st place

Gregers Christian Münter (18 December 1907 – 31 March 1988) was a Danish Officer and later sports shooter. He participated in the Danish resistance against the German forces during Operation Safari, afterwards he was part of the Danish resistance movement where he was involved in several actions against the Germans. He competed in the 25 m pistol event at the 1948 Summer Olympics.
