= Sven Lundquist =

Swedish sport shooter

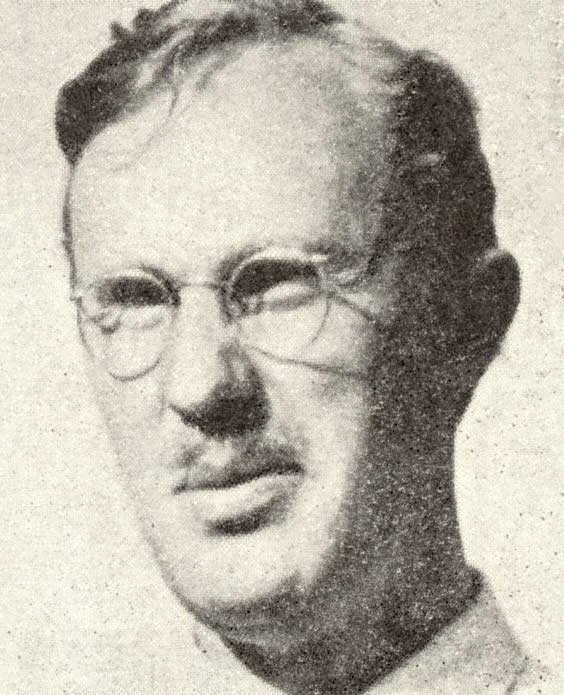

Personal information
- Born: 24 March 1920 Borås, Sweden
- Died: 3 September 2007 (aged 87) Lidingö, Sweden

Sport
- Sport: Sports shooting
- Event: Pistol
- Club: Hjortskyttarna, Stockholm
Medal record
Representing Sweden
Olympic Games
Bronze medal – third place	1948 London	25 m pistol

Sven Anders Viktor Lundquist (24 March 1920 – 3 September 2007) was a Swedish sport shooter. He won a bronze medal in 25 metre rapid fire pistol at the 1948 Summer Olympics in London.
