= Dimitrios Zografos =

Greek water polo player (c. 1921–2010)

Personal information
- Nationality: Greek
- Born: c. 1921
- Died: 5 November 2010

Sport
- Sport: Water polo

Dimitrios Zografos (c. 1921 – 5 November 2010) was a Greek water polo player. He competed in the men's tournament at the 1948 Summer Olympics.
