= José Roger =

Argentine sports shooter

Personal information
- Full name: José Juan Félix Roger Pascual
- Born: 20 January 1916 Buenos Aires, Argentina
- Died: 21 February 1983 (aged 67) Saladillo, Buenos Aires, Argentina

Sport
- Sport: Sports shooting

José Roger (20 January 1916 – 21 February 1983) was an Argentine sports shooter. He competed in the 25 m pistol event at the 1948 Summer Olympics.
