= Reg Potter =

British water polo player

Personal information
- Nationality: British
- Born: 7 October 1914; London, England
- Died: 2 July 1998 (aged 83); Gloucester, England

Sport
- Sport: Water polo

Reginald Percival Potter (7 October 1914 – 2 July 1998) was a British water polo player. He competed in the men's tournament at the 1948 Summer Olympics.
