= Roy Garforth =

British water polo player

Personal information
- Full name: Roy Russell Garforth
- Nationality: British
- Born: 30 April 1918; Bradford, England
- Died: 5 November 1991 (aged 73); Leeds, England

Sport
- Sport: Water polo

Roy Russell Garforth (30 April 1918 – 5 November 1991) was a British water polo player. He competed in the men's tournament at the 1948 Summer Olympics.
