= Georges Hauser =

Swiss water polo player (born 1914)

Personal information
- Nationality: Swiss
- Born: 1914

Sport
- Sport: Water polo

Georges Hauser (born 1914, date of death unknown) was a Swiss water polo player. He competed in the men's tournament at the 1948 Summer Olympics.
