= Marco Diener =

French water polo player (1913–1965)

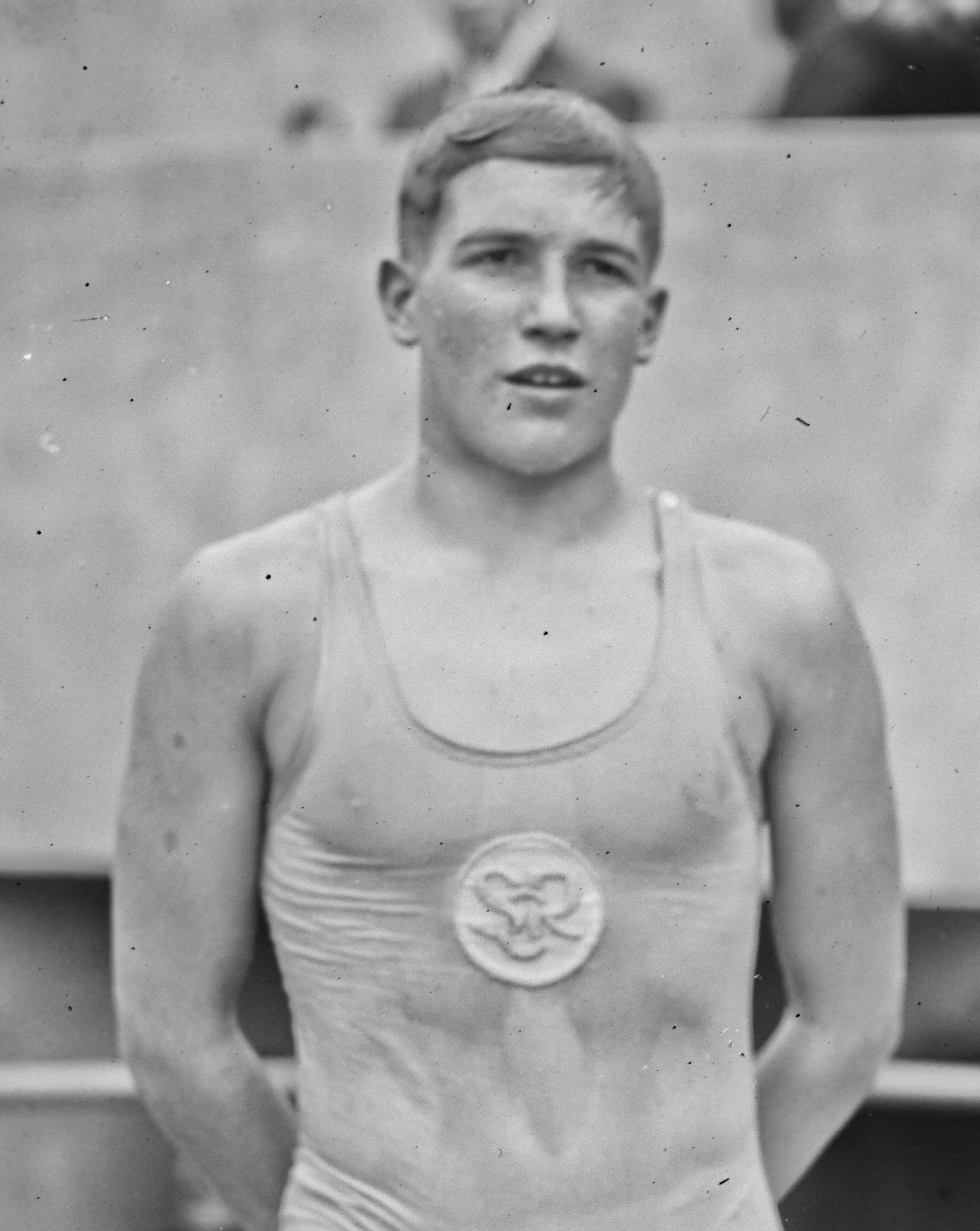
- Marco Diener in 1929

Personal information
- Nationality: French
- Born: 29 May 1913; Colmar, France
- Died: 18 June 1965 (aged 52); Passage d'Agen, France

Sport
- Sport: Water polo

Marco Diener (29 May 1913 – 18 June 1965) was a French water polo player. He competed in the men's tournament at the 1948 Summer Olympics.
