= Julia López =

Julia López may refer to:

- Julia López (painter) (born 1936), Mexican painter
- Julia Lopez (politician) (born 1984), British politician
- Juliana López (1886-1971), Spanish anarchist

== See also ==
- Julián López (disambiguation)
- Júlio López (disambiguation)
- Júlia Lopes de Almeida (1862-1934), Brazilian writer
- Julie Lopes-Curval (born 1972), French film and theater director
