= Trevor Lewis (water polo) =

British water polo player

Personal information
- Nationality: British
- Born: 16 August 1919; Swansea, Wales
- Died: 19 May 1995 (aged 75); Swansea, Wales

Sport
- Sport: Water polo

Trevor John Lewis (16 August 1919 – 19 May 1995) was a British water polo player. He competed in the men's tournament at the 1948 Summer Olympics.
