= José Alanís =

Mexican sports shooter

José Guadalupe Alanís Tamez
Personal information
- Born: 4 June 1910 Monterrey, Mexico
- Died: 3 May 2003 (aged 92) Monterrey, Mexico

Sport
- Sport: Sports shooting

José Guadalupe Alanís Tamez (4 June 1910 – 3 May 2003) was a Mexican sport shooter. He competed in the 25 metre rapid fire pistol event at the 25 m pistol event at the 1948 Summer Olympics held in London.
