= Osvaldo Mariño =

Uruguayan water polo player

Personal information
- Born: 19 July 1923; Montevideo, Uruguay
- Died: 20 September 2007 (aged 84)

Sport
- Sport: Water polo

Osvaldo Mariño (19 July 1923 – 20 September 2007) was a Uruguayan water polo player. He competed in the men's tournament at the 1948 Summer Olympics.
