= Paul Rigaumont =

Belgian water polo player

Personal information
- Nationality: Belgian
- Born: 16 February 1920
- Died: 20 October 1960 (aged 40)

Sport
- Sport: Water polo

Paul Rigaumont (16 February 1920 – 20 October 1960) was a Belgian water polo player. He competed in the men's tournament at the 1948 Summer Olympics.
