= Knut Gadd =

Swedish water polo player

Personal information
- Born: December 4, 1916; Malmö, Sweden
- Died: May 8, 1995 (aged 78); Borås, Sweden

Sport
- Sport: Water polo

Knut Gustaf Gadd (4 December 1916 – 8 May 1995) was a Swedish water polo player who competed in the 1948 Summer Olympics. In 1948 he was part of the Swedish team which finished fifth in the water polo tournament. He played one match.
