= Odd Bonde Nielsen =

Norwegian sport shooter (1888–1974)

Personal information
- Born: 11 September 1898 Oslo, Norway
- Died: 26 February 1974 (aged 75) Oslo, Norway

Sport
- Sport: Sports shooting

Odd Bonde Nielsen (11 September 1898 – 26 February 1974) was a Norwegian sport shooter. He was born in Oslo. He competed at the 1948 Summer Olympics in London, where he placed 16th in the 25 metre rapid fire pistol.
