= Ioannis Papstefanou =

Greek water polo player

Personal information
- Nationality: Greek

Sport
- Sport: Water polo

Ioannis Papstefanou was a Greek water polo player. He competed in the men's tournament at the 1948 Summer Olympics.
