= Teodoro Salah =

Chilean water polo player (1917–1995)

Personal information
- Born: 13 May 1917 Santiago, Chile
- Died: 19 February 1995 (aged 77) Viña del Mar, Chile

Sport
- Sport: Water polo

Teodoro Salah (13 May 1917 – 19 February 1995) was a Chilean water polo player. He competed in the men's tournament at the 1948 Summer Olympics.
