= Émile D'Hooge =

Belgian water polo player

Personal information
- Nationality: Belgian
- Born: 4 August 1908; Ghent, Belgium
- Died: 4 March 1955 (aged 46); Ghent, Belgium

Sport
- Sport: Water polo

Émile D'Hooge (4 August 1908 – 4 March 1955) was a Belgian water polo player. He competed in the men's tournament at the 1948 Summer Olympics.
