= Raúl Castro (water polo) =

Uruguayan water polo player (1920–1978)

Personal information
- Full name: Raúl Mauricio Castro Nilson
- Born: May 1920 Montevideo, Uruguay
- Died: 1 July 1978 (aged 58) Montevideo, Uruguay

Sport
- Sport: Water polo

Raúl Castro (May 1920 – 1 July 1978) was a Uruguayan water polo player. He competed in the men's tournament at the 1948 Summer Olympics. He died on 1st July 1978, at the age of 58.
