= Hernando Hernández =

Cuban sports shooter

Personal information
- Full name: Hernando Hernández Hernández
- Born: 14 November 1910 Perico, Matanzas, Cuba
- Died: 16 January 1968 (aged 57) La Cabaña Prison, Havana, Cuba

Sport
- Country: Cuba
- Sport: Sports shooting

Hernando Hernández (14 November 1910 – 16 January 1968) was a Cuban police officer and sports shooter.

== Career ==
By the late 1940s Hernández was a Havana police captain and chief of the Third Police Station. He competed in the 25 m pistol event at the 1948 Summer Olympics (19th place). After the 1956 death of the Cuban Police Chief Brigadier General Rafael Salas Cañizares, the president Fulgencio Batista elevated Hernández–by then newly promoted brigadier general–to lead the National Police. Following the triumph of the Cuban Revolution on January 1, 1959, he was detained in Havana on January 6. A revolutionary tribunal later tried him in connection with the 1957 killing of opposition leader (and former senator) Pelayo Cuervo; on 19 May 1959 Hernández received a 20-year prison sentence. He remained incarcerated until his death in 1968 in La Cabaña Prison (Havana) from a possible heart attack.
