= Jacques Viaene =

French water polo player (1929–1962)

Personal information
- Nationality: French
- Born: 25 September 1929
- Died: 19 September 1962 (aged 32)

Sport
- Sport: Water polo

Jacques Viaene (25 September 1929 – 19 September 1962) was a French water polo player. He competed in the men's tournament at the 1948 Summer Olympics.
