= Didier Hesse =

French sports shooter (1901–1974)

Personal information
- Born: 17 March 1901
- Died: 13 August 1974 (aged 73)

Sport
- Sport: Sports shooting

Didier Hesse (17 March 1901 – 13 August 1974) was a French sports shooter. He competed in the 25 m pistol event at the 1948 Summer Olympics.
