= Leo Ravilo =

Finnish sports shooter

Personal information
- Born: 25 September 1907 Turku, Finland
- Died: 11 October 1975 (aged 68) Lohja, Finland

Sport
- Sport: Sports shooting

Leo Ravilo (25 September 1907 – 11 October 1975) was a Finnish sports shooter. He competed in the 25 m pistol event at the 1948 Summer Olympics.
