= Erwin Klumpp =

Swiss water polo player (1921–2010)

Personal information
- Nationality: Swiss
- Born: 1921
- Died: 2010 (aged 88–89)

Sport
- Sport: Water polo

Erwin Klumpp (1921–2010) was a Swiss water polo player. He competed in the men's tournament at the 1948 Summer Olympics. Klumpp died in 2010.
