= Ivo Giovanelli =

Croatian water polo player

Personal information
- Nationality: Croatian
- Born: 22 May 1919; Split, Kingdom of Serbs, Croats, and Slovenes
- Died: 29 July 2009 (aged 90); Split, Croatia

Sport
- Sport: Water polo
- Club: VK Jadran Split

Ivo Giovanelli (22 May 1919 – 29 July 2009) was a Croatian water polo player. He competed in the men's tournament at the 1948 Summer Olympics.
