= Willy Simons =

Belgian water polo player

Personal information
- Nationality: Belgian
- Born: 9 November 1917; Borgerhout, Belgium
- Died: 4 December 2009 (aged 92)

Sport
- Sport: Water polo

Willy Simons (9 November 1917 – 4 December 2009) was a Belgian water polo player. He competed in the men's tournament at the 1948 Summer Olympics.
