= Froilán Tantaleán =

Peruvian sports shooter

Personal information
- Full name: Froilán Tantaleán Zorilla
- Born: 1899 Chota, Peru
- Died: ?

Sport
- Sport: Sports shooting

Froilán Tantaleán (born 1899, date of death unknown) was a Peruvian sports shooter. He competed in the 25 m pistol event at the 1948 Summer Olympics.
