= Ivo Kurtini =

Croatian water polo player (1922–1990)

Personal information
- Full name: Ivica Kurtini
- Nationality: Croatian
- Born: 23 June 1922 Fiume, Free State of Fiume
- Died: 12 September 1990 (aged 68)

Sport
- Sport: Water polo
National team
- Years: Team
- 1948-1954: Yugoslavia
Medal record
Men's water polo
Representing Yugoslavia
Olympic Games
Silver medal – second place	1952 Helsinki	Team competition
European Championship
Bronze medal – third place	1950 Vienna	Team competition
Silver medal – second place	1954 Turin	Team competition

Ivica "Jobo" Kurtini (23 June 1922 – 12 September 1990) was a Croat water polo player who competed for Yugoslavia in the 1948 Summer Olympics and in the 1952 Summer Olympics.

He was part of the Yugoslav team which was eliminated in the second round of the 1948 Olympic tournament. He played all three matches.

Four years later he won the silver medal with the Yugoslav team in the 1952 tournament. He played all nine matches.

== See also ==
- List of Olympic medalists in water polo (men)
