= Svante Törnvall =

Chilean water polo player

Personal information
- Born: 10 July 1916; Coquimbo, Chile
- Died: 1 March 2004 (aged 87); Santiago, Chile

Sport
- Sport: Water polo

Svante Törnvall Strömsten (10 July 1916 – 1 March 2004) was a Chilean-Swedish water polo player and ambassador. He competed in the men's tournament at the 1948 Summer Olympics.
