= Roger Dewasch =

French water polo player (1920–1989)

Personal information
- Nationality: French
- Born: 7 October 1920; Tourcoing, Nord, France
- Died: 24 April 1989 (aged 68); Tourcoing, Nord, France

Sport
- Sport: Water polo

Roger Jean Dewasch (7 October 1920 – 24 April 1989) was a French water polo player. He competed in the men's tournament at the 1948 Summer Olympics.
