= Olle Ohlson =

Swedish water polo player

Personal information
- Born: June 18, 1921; Stockholm, Sweden
- Died: May 12, 1983 (aged 61); Stockholm, Sweden

Sport
- Sport: Water polo

Olov "Olle" Axel Herman Ohlson (18 June 1921 – 12 May 1983) was a Swedish water polo player who competed in the 1948 Summer Olympics. In 1948 he was part of the Swedish team which finished fifth in the water polo tournament. He played five matches.
