= Roger Le Bras =

French water polo player (1919–2008)

Personal information
- Nationality: French
- Born: 22 December 1919; Bohars, Finistère, France
- Died: 28 July 2008 (aged 88); Latresne, Gironde, France

Sport
- Sport: Water polo

Roger Le Bras (22 December 1919 – 28 July 2008) was a French water polo player. He competed in the men's tournament at the 1948 Summer Olympics.
