= Mohamed Hemmat =

Egyptian water polo player (d. 1973)

Personal information
- Nationality: Egyptian
- Died: 27 July 1973

Sport
- Sport: Water polo

Mohamed Hemmat (died 27 July 1973) was an Egyptian water polo player. He competed in the men's tournament at the 1948 Summer Olympics.
