= Bob Chow =

American sports shooter

F Bob Chow
Personal information
- Full name: Frank Robert Chow
- Born: Frank Robert Chow; November 30, 1907 Stockton, California, United States
- Died: October 17, 2003 (aged 95) Piedmont, California, United States

Sport
- Sport: Sports shooting

Frank Robert Chow (November 30, 1907 – October 17, 2003) was an American sports shooter. He competed in the 25 m pistol event at the 1948 Summer Olympics.
