= Leonel Gabriel =

Uruguayan water polo player (1919–2005)

Personal information
- Born: 13 July 1919; Montevideo, Uruguay
- Died: 21 January 2005 (aged 85)

Sport
- Sport: Water polo

Leonel Gabriel (13 July 1919 – 21 January 2005) was a Uruguayan water polo player. He competed in the men's tournament at the 1948 Summer Olympics.
