= Tristan Sauer =

Swiss water polo player

Personal information
- Nationality: Swiss
- Born: 15 February 1920
- Died: 11 August 2007 (aged 87)

Sport
- Sport: Water polo

Tristan Sauer (15 February 1920 – 11 August 2007) was a Swiss water polo player. He competed in the men's tournament at the 1948 Summer Olympics.
