= Mohamed Khadry =

Egyptian water polo player

Personal information
- Nationality: Egyptian

Sport
- Sport: Water polo

Mohamed Khadry is an Egyptian water polo player. He competed in the men's tournament at the 1948 Summer Olympics.
