= Luis Díez =

Argentine water polo player (1923–2015)

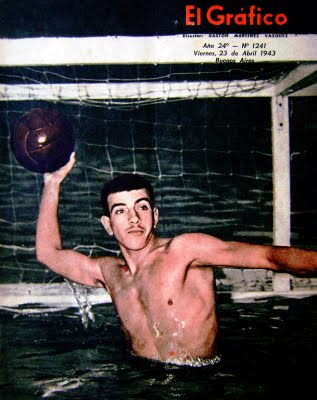
- Díez in 1952

Personal information
- Born: November 2, 1923 Buenos Aires, Argentina
- Died: September 23, 2015 (aged 91)

Sport
- Sport: Water polo

Luis Antonio Díez (2 November 1923 – 23 September 2015) was an Argentine water polo player who competed in the 1952 Summer Olympics.
