= Catherine Grosjean =

French swimmer

Personal information
- Born: 24 April 1947 (age 79) Casablanca, Morocco

Sport
- Sport: Swimming

Catherine Grosjean (or Grojean) (born 24 April 1947) is a French former swimmer. She competed in two events at the 1968 Summer Olympics.
