= Aldo Ghira =

Italian water polo player

Personal information
- Born: 4 April 1920 Trieste, Italy
- Died: 13 July 1991 (aged 71) Rome, Italy
- Spouse: Maria Cecilia Angelini Rota

Sport
- Sport: Water polo
Medal record
Representing Italy
Olympic Games
Gold medal – first place	1948 London	Team competition

Aldo Ghira (4 April 1920 – 13 July 1991) was an Italian water polo player who competed in the 1948 Summer Olympics.

He was part of the Italian team which won the gold medal. He played all seven matches.

Aldo Ghira was married to Maria Cecilia Angelini Rota and father of Andrea Ghira.

== See also ==
- Italy men's Olympic water polo team records and statistics
- List of Olympic champions in men's water polo
- List of Olympic medalists in water polo (men)
