= Emilio Bulgarelli =

Italian water polo player (1917–1993)

Personal information
- Born: 14 February 1917 Reggio di Calabria, Italy
- Died: 2 February 1993 (aged 75) Naples, Italy

Sport
- Sport: Water polo
Medal record
Representing Italy
Olympic Games
Gold medal – first place	1948 London	Team competition

Emilio Bulgarelli (14 February 1917 – 2 February 1993) was an Italian water polo player who competed in the 1948 Summer Olympics. He was born in Reggio di Calabria and died in Naples. In 1948 he was a member of the Italian team which won the gold medal. He played all seven matches.

== See also ==
- Italy men's Olympic water polo team records and statistics
- List of Olympic champions in men's water polo
- List of Olympic medalists in water polo (men)
