= Alejandro Febrero =

Spanish swimmer

Personal information
- Full name: Alejandro Febrero Lorenzo
- Born: 25 February 1925 Madrid, Spain
- Died: 13 August 2010 (aged 85) Vigo, Spain

Sport
- Sport: Swimming

Alejandro Febrero Lorenzo (Note: In this Spanish name, the first or paternal surname is Febrero and the second or maternal family name is Lorenzo.) (25 February 1925 – 13 August 2010) was a Spanish freestyle swimmer. He competed in two events at the 1948 Summer Olympics.
