= Rafael Cadalso =

Cuban sports shooter

Personal information
- Born: 9 January 1914 Havana, Cuba
- Died: 22 December 1968 (aged 54) Caracas, Venezuela

Sport
- Sport: Sports shooting

Rafael Cadalso (9 November 1914 – 22 December 1968) was a Cuban sports shooter. He competed in the 25 m pistol event at the 1948 Summer Olympics.
