= Isidoro Pérez =

Spanish swimmer (born 1928)

Personal information
- Born: 5 March 1928 (age 98) Madrid, Spain

Sport
- Sport: Swimming

Isidoro Pérez (born 5 March 1928) is a Spanish former freestyle swimmer. He competed in three events at the 1948 Summer Olympics.
