= Jim Nestor =

Australian cyclist (1920–2010)

Personal information
- Full name: Edward James Nestor
- Born: 12 January 1920 Jamestown, South Australia, Australia
- Died: 16 June 2010 (aged 90) Bedford Park, South Australia, Australia

Cycling career
- Sport: Cycling

Edward James Nestor (12 January 1920 – 16 June 2010) was an Australian cyclist. He competed at the 1948 Summer Olympics and 1956 Summer Olympics. Nestor also set the fastest time in the amateur Goulburn to Sydney Classic in 1949 run from Goulburn to Enfield.

At the 1956 Games, Nestor, aged 36 years, 331 days, was the oldest of the 161 competitors at the cycling events. The youngest, Pakistan's Saleem Farooqi, was 16 years and 121 days old.
