= Valentín Sabate =

Spanish water polo player (1921–1986)

Personal information
- Nationality: Spanish
- Born: 1 December 1921; Barcelona, Spain
- Died: 4 October 1986 (aged 64); Barcelona, Spain

Sport
- Sport: Water polo

Valentín Sabate (1 December 1921 – 4 October 1986) was a Spanish water polo player. He competed in the men's tournament at the 1948 Summer Olympics.
