= Georges Leenheere =

Belgian water polo player (1919–1971)

Personal information
- Full name: Georges Bertrand Leenheere
- Nationality: Belgian
- Born: 21 November 1919 Brussels, Belgium
- Died: 8 February 1971 (aged 51) Brussels, Belgium

Sport
- Sport: Water polo

Georges Bertrand Leenheere (21 November 1919 – 8 February 1971) was a Belgian water polo player. He competed at the 1948 Summer Olympics and the 1952 Summer Olympics. Leenheere died in Brussels on 8 February 1971, at the age of 51.
