= Pasquale Buonocore =

Italian water polo player (1916–2003)

Personal information
- Born: 17 May 1916 Naples, Italy
- Died: 1 September 2003 (aged 87) Naples, Italy

Sport
- Sport: Water polo
Medal record
Representing Italy
Olympic Games
| Gold medal – first place | 1948 London | Team competition |

Pasquale Buonocore (17 May 1916 – 1 September 2003) was an Italian water polo player who competed in the 1948 Summer Olympics.

Buonocore was part of the Italian team which won the gold medal. He played all seven matches as a goalkeeper.

== See also ==
- Italy men's Olympic water polo team records and statistics
- List of Olympic champions in men's water polo
- List of Olympic medalists in water polo (men)
- List of men's Olympic water polo tournament goalkeepers
