= José Pujol (water polo) =

Spanish water polo player (1922–2013)

Personal information
- Nationality: Spanish
- Born: 29 September 1922; Barcelona, Spain
- Died: 4 June 2013 (aged 90)

Sport
- Sport: Water polo

José Pujol (29 September 1922 – 4 June 2013) was a Spanish water polo player. He competed in the men's tournament at the 1948 Summer Olympics.
