= Àngel Sabata =

Spanish water polo player (1911–1990)

Personal information
- Born: March 28, 1911; Barcelona, Spain
- Died: September 24, 1990 (aged 79); Barcelona, Spain

Sport
- Sport: Water polo

Àngel Sabata Figa (28 March 1911 – 24 September 1990) was a Spanish water polo player who competed in the 1928 Summer Olympics and in the 1948 Summer Olympics. In 1928 he played in the only match for Spain in the water polo tournament. Twenty years later he was part of the Spanish team which finished eighth in the 1948 tournament. He played four matches.
