= Manuel Guerra (swimmer) =

Spanish swimmer (1928–2020)

Personal information
- Full name: Manuel Guerra Pérez
- Born: 18 July 1928 Las Palmas, Spain
- Died: 7 October 2020 (aged 92)

Sport
- Sport: Swimming

Manuel Guerra Pérez (18 July 1928 – 7 October 2020) was a Spanish backstroke and freestyle swimmer. He competed in three events at the 1948 Summer Olympics.
