= Pedro Peña y Lillo =

Chilean sports shooter

Personal information
- Born: 24 March 1902
- Died: 4 May 1969 (aged 67)

Sport
- Sport: Sports shooting

Pedro Peña y Lillo (24 March 1902 – 4 May 1969) was a Chilean sports shooter. He competed in the 25 m pistol event at the 1948 Summer Olympics.
