= Juan Bucetta =

Uruguayan water polo player (1927–2017)

Personal information
- Born: 20 March 1927; Montevideo, Uruguay
- Died: 19 December 2017 (aged 90)

Sport
- Sport: Water polo

Juan Bucetta (20 March 1927 – 19 December 2017) was a Uruguayan water polo player. He competed in the men's tournament at the 1948 Summer Olympics.
