= Pál Pók =

Hungarian water polo player

Personal information
- Nationality: Hungarian
- Born: 27 June 1929 Eger, Hungary
- Died: 11 September 1982 (aged 53) Budapest, Hungary

Sport
- Sport: Water polo

Pál Pók (27 June 1929 – 11 September 1982) was a Hungarian water polo player. He competed in the men's tournament at the 1948 Summer Olympics, winning a silver medal.
