= Joan Serra =

Spanish water polo player (1927–2015)

Personal information
- Born: 8 July 1927 Sabadell, Spain
- Died: 24 January 2015 (aged 87) Sabadell, Spain

Sport
- Sport: Water polo
Medal record
Representing Spain
Mediterranean Games
| Gold medal – first place | 1951 Alexandria | Men's tournament |

Joan Serra Llobet (8 July 1927 – 24 January 2015) was a Spanish water polo player who competed in the 1948 Summer Olympics. He was born in Sabadell, Catalonia.

Serra was part of the Spanish team which finished eighth in the 1948 tournament. He played all seven matches as goalkeeper. In 1951 won the gold medal in the Mediterranean Games. He died in Sabadell on 24 January 2015, aged 87.

== See also ==
- Spain men's Olympic water polo team records and statistics
- List of men's Olympic water polo tournament goalkeepers
