= Carlos Martí (water polo) =

Spanish water polo player (1919–1999)

Personal information
- Nationality: Spanish
- Born: February 22, 1919; Barcelona, Spain
- Died: 25 October 1999 (aged 80); Barcelona, Spain

Sport
- Sport: Water polo

Carlos Martí (22 February 1919 – 25 October 1999) was a Spanish water polo player. He competed in the men's tournament at the 1948 Summer Olympics.
