= Pelegrín Esteve =

Spanish sports shooter

Personal information
- Born: 22 May 1901 Barcelona, Spain
- Died: 2 June 1968 (aged 67) Barcelona, Spain

Sport
- Sport: Sports shooting

Pelegrín Esteve (22 May 1901 – 2 June 1968) was a Spanish sports shooter. He competed in the 25 m pistol event at the 1948 Summer Olympics.
