= Julio López (water polo) =

Uruguayan water polo player (1922–1984)

Personal information
- Born: 17 July 1922 Montevideo, Uruguay
- Died: 30 August 1984 (aged 62) Montevideo, Uruguay

Sport
- Sport: Water polo

Julio Romeo López (17 July 1922 – 30 August 1984) was a Uruguayan water polo player. He competed in the men's tournament at the 1948 Summer Olympics. López died in Montevideo on 30 August 1984, at the age of 62.
