= André Grosjean =

Swiss water polo player

Personal information
- Nationality: Swiss
- Born: 7 September 1921
- Died: 5 November 2006 (aged 85)

Sport
- Sport: Water polo

André Grosjean (7 September 1921 – 5 November 2006) was a Swiss water polo player. He competed in the men's tournament at the 1948 Summer Olympics.
