= John Layton (sport shooter) =

American sports shooter

Personal information
- Born: August 7, 1912 Washington, D.C., United States
- Died: October 5, 1989 (aged 77) Washington, D.C., United States

Sport
- Sport: Sports shooting

John Layton (August 7, 1912 – October 5, 1989) was an American sports shooter. He competed in the 25 m pistol event at the 1948 Summer Olympics.
