= Roger Cornforth =

Australian water polo player

Personal information
- Nationality: Australian
- Born: 19 January 1919 Mosman, New South Wales, Australia
- Died: 19 March 1976 (aged 57) Mosman, New South Wales, Australia

Sport
- Sport: Water polo

Roger Cornforth (19 January 1919 – 19 March 1976) was Captain of North Sydney Boys High School in 1935. His brother was Sir John Cornforth who shared the 1975 Nobel Prize for Chemistry with Swiss chemist Vladimir Prelog.

He was a POW at Changi and returned emaciated. He then rebuilt his physique which enabled him to represent Australia in Rugby Union in 1947 and 1949 against New Zealand and in 1950 against the British Lions, partnering Rex Mossop in the second row.

He was also an Australian water polo player. He competed in the men's tournament at the 1948 Summer Olympics.
