= Anibál Filiberti =

Argentine water polo player (1914–1998)

Personal information
- Born: 31 March 1914 Rosario, Santa Fe, Argentina
- Died: 17 February 1998 (aged 83)

Sport
- Sport: Water polo

Anibál Filiberti (31 March 1914 – 17 February 1998) was an Argentine water polo player who competed in the 1948 Summer Olympics.
