= Jack King (water polo) =

Australian water polo player

Personal information
- Nationality: Australian
- Born: 23 August 1910
- Died: 2 March 2000 (aged 89) Warriewood, New South Wales, Australia

Sport
- Sport: Water polo

Jack King (23 August 1910 – 2 March 2000) was an Australian water polo player. He competed in the men's tournament at the 1948 Summer Olympics.
