= Francisco Castillo (water polo) =

Spanish water polo player (1921–1997)

Personal information
- Nationality: Spanish
- Born: 9 January 1921 Barcelona, Spain
- Died: 7 January 1997 (aged 75) Barcelona, Spain

Sport
- Sport: Water polo

Francisco Castillo (9 January 1921 – 7 January 1997) was a Spanish water polo player. He competed at the 1948 Summer Olympics and the 1952 Summer Olympics.
