= Herman Doerner =

Australian water polo player

Personal information
- Nationality: Australian
- Born: 22 November 1914; Randwick, New South Wales, Australia
- Died: 27 December 1976 (aged 62); Fairlight, New South Wales, Australia

Sport
- Sport: Water polo

Herman Doerner (22 November 1914 – 27 December 1976) was an Australian water polo player. He competed in the men's tournament at the 1948 Summer Olympics. He also won the gold medal with the Australian team in the exhibition event at the 1950 British Empire Games.
