= Jack Ferguson (water polo, born 1922) =

Australian water polo player

Personal information
- Born: 12 April 1922 Sydney, Australia
- Died: 15 December 1993 (aged 71) Elanora, Australia

Sport
- Sport: Water polo

John Farquharson "Jack" Ferguson (12 April 1922 – 15 December 1993) was an Australian water polo player who competed in the 1948 Summer Olympics along with his brother Leon Ferguson.

At the Olympics he met his future wife, athlete June Maston.
