= Dezső Lemhényi =

Hungarian water polo player

Personal information
- Born: 9 December 1917 Budapest, Austria-Hungary
- Died: 4 December 2003 (aged 85) Budapest, Hungary

Sport
- Sport: Water polo
Medal record
Representing Hungary
Olympic Games
Gold medal – first place	1952 Helsinki	Team competition
Silver medal – second place	1948 London	Team competition

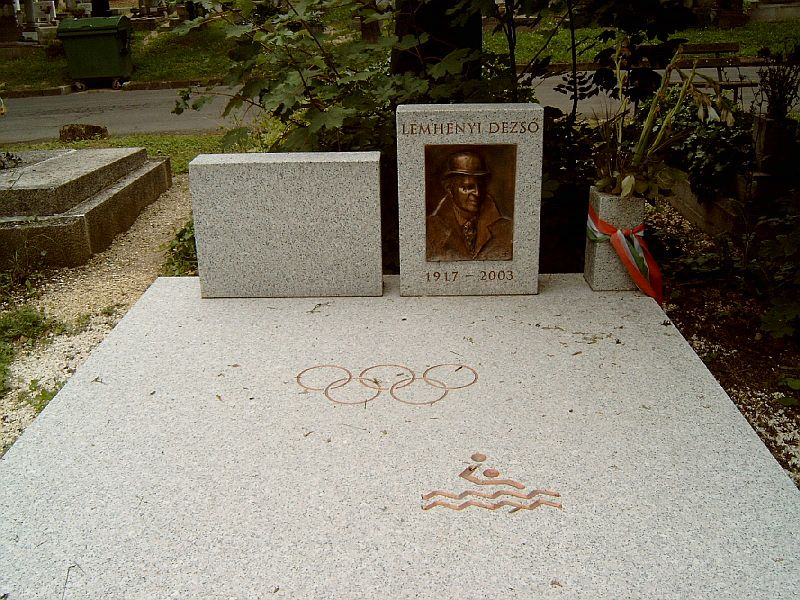
Lemhényi's grave in Budapest.

Dezső Lemhényi (né Kollmann, 9 December 1917 – 4 December 2003) was a Hungarian water polo player who competed at the 1948 Summer Olympics and 1952 Summer Olympics. He was the husband of Olga Tass.

Lemhényi was part of the Hungarian team which won the silver medal at the 1948 tournament. He played six matches and scored three goals.

Four years later he was a member of the Hungarian team which won the gold medal at the 1952 Olympic tournament. He played two matches and scored five goals.

He is one of a few sportspeople who won Olympic medals in water polo as players and head coaches. He was inducted into the International Swimming Hall of Fame.

== See also ==
- Hungary men's Olympic water polo team records and statistics
- List of Olympic champions in men's water polo
- List of Olympic medalists in water polo (men)
- List of members of the International Swimming Hall of Fame
