= Miklós Holop =

Hungarian water polo player

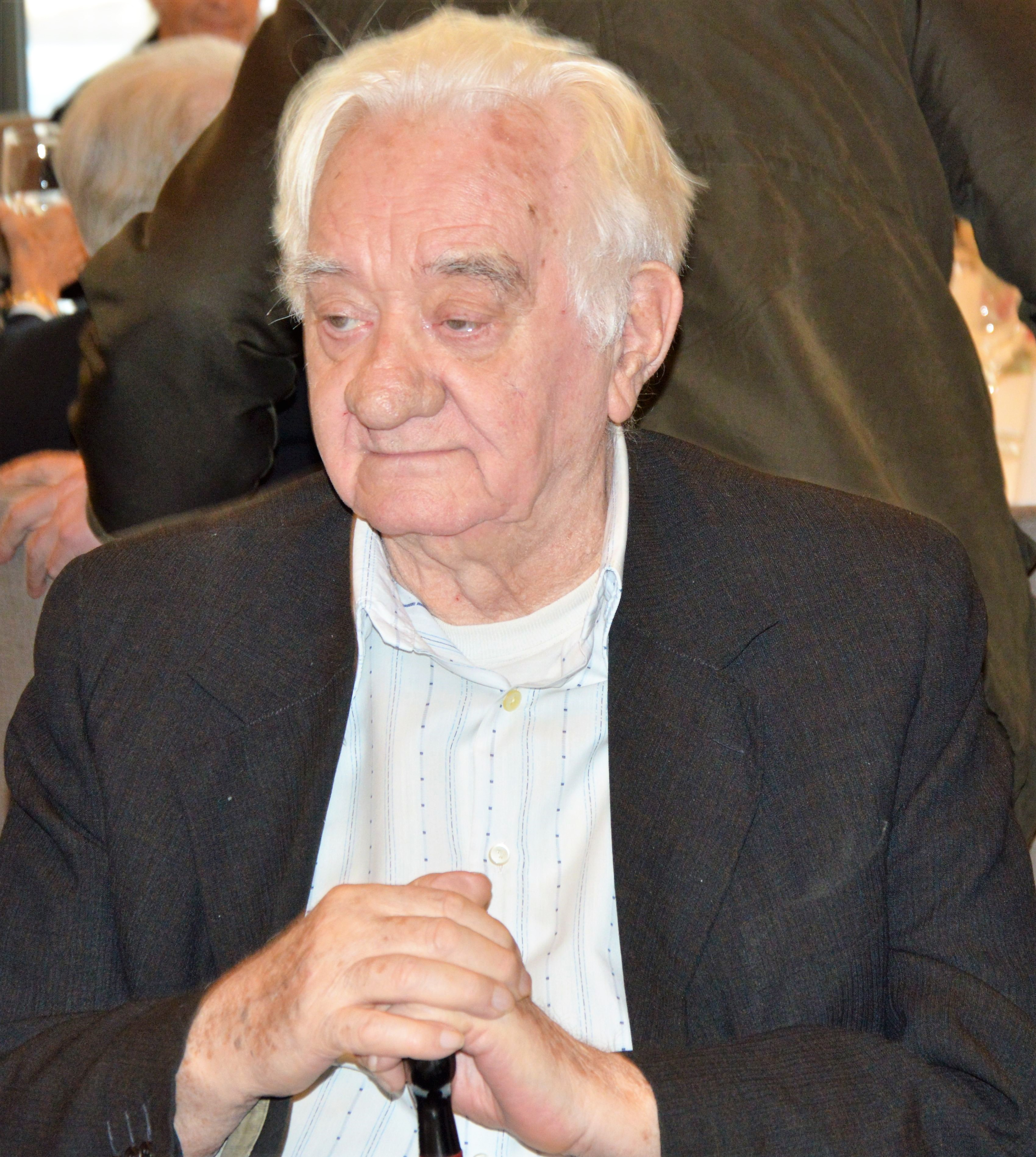

Personal information
- Born: 2 February 1925 Budapest, Hungary
- Died: 12 November 2017 (aged 92)

Sport
- Sport: Water polo
Medal record
Representing Hungary
Olympic Games
Silver medal – second place	1948 London	Team competition

Miklós Holop (2 February 1925 – 12 November 2017) was a Hungarian water polo player who competed in the 1948 Summer Olympics. He was born in Budapest. He was part of the Hungarian team which won the silver medal. He played all seven matches.

== See also ==
- List of Olympic medalists in water polo (men)
