= Marcelo Visentín =

Argentine water polo player (1914–1998)

Personal information
- Born: May 30, 1914
- Died: December 16, 1998 (aged 84)

Sport
- Sport: Water polo

Marcelo Euclides Visentín (30 May 1914 – 16 December 1998) was an Argentine water polo player who competed in the 1948 Summer Olympics and in the 1952 Summer Olympics.
