= Károly Szittya =

Hungarian water polo player

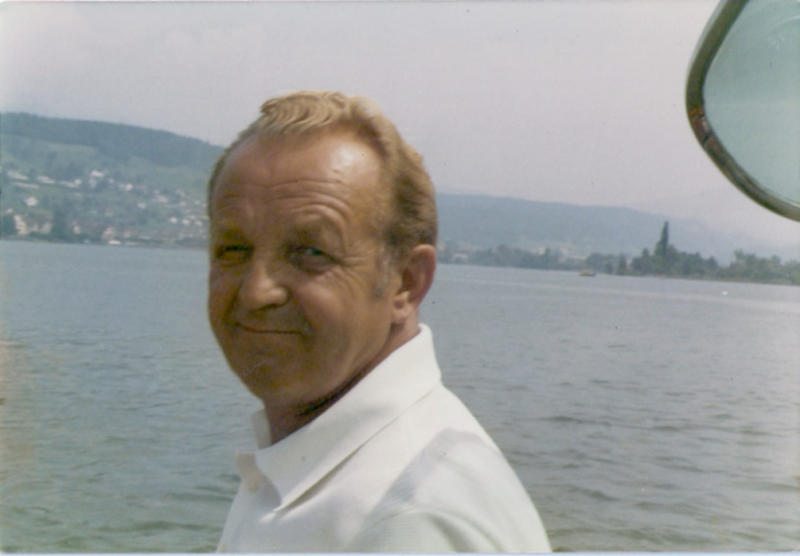

Personal information
- Born: June 18, 1918 Budapest, Austria-Hungary
- Died: August 9, 1983 (aged 65) Szeged, Hungary

Sport
- Sport: Water polo
Medal record
Representing Hungary
Olympic Games
| Gold medal – first place | 1952 Helsinki | Team competition |
| Silver medal – second place | 1948 London | Team competition |

Károly Szittya (18 June 1918 – 9 August 1983) was a Hungarian swimmer and water polo player who competed in the 1948 Summer Olympics and in the 1952 Summer Olympics. He played in Újpesti Dózsa 1930–1947, and Ferencvárosi TC 1948–1954. He was born in Budapest and died in Szeged.

Szittya was part of the Hungarian team which won the silver medal in the 1948 tournament. He played six matches and scored six goals. Four years later he was a member of the Hungarian team which won the gold medal in the Olympic tournament. He played three matches and scored five goals.

After his active sports career he was a water polo coach in Hungary and Cuba. In 1969 he became a member of the Hungarian Olympic Committee and received a Master Coach Award.

== See also ==
- Hungary men's Olympic water polo team records and statistics
- List of Olympic champions in men's water polo
- List of Olympic medalists in water polo (men)
