= Lajos Börzsönyi =

Hungarian sports shooter

Personal information
- Born: 18 January 1916 Budapest, Austria-Hungary
- Died: 30 April 1984 (aged 68)

Sport
- Sport: Sports shooting

Lajos Börzsönyi (18 January 1916 – 30 April 1984) was a Hungarian sports shooter. He competed in two events at the 1948 Summer Olympics.
