= Endre Győrfi =

Hungarian water polo player

Personal information
- Born: March 30, 1920 Hajmáskér, Hungary
- Died: June 2, 1992 (aged 72) Balatonföldvár, Hungary

Sport
- Sport: Water polo
Medal record
Representing Hungary
Olympic Games
Silver medal – second place	1948 London	Team competition

Endre Győrfi (30 March 1920 – 2 June 1992) was a Hungarian water polo player who competed in the 1948 Summer Olympics.

He was part of the Hungarian team which won the silver medal. He played five matches as goalkeeper.

== See also ==
- Hungary men's Olympic water polo team records and statistics
- List of Olympic medalists in water polo (men)
- List of men's Olympic water polo tournament goalkeepers
