= Leon Ferguson =

Australian water polo player

Personal information
- Born: June 19, 1923 Randwick, Australia
- Died: July 31, 1989 (aged 66) Bexley, Australia

Sport
- Sport: Water polo

Leon Henry Ferguson (19 June 1923 – 31 July 1989) was an Australian water polo player who competed in the 1948 Summer Olympics along with his brother Jack Ferguson.
