= Osvaldo Codaro =

Argentine water polo player (1930–2017)

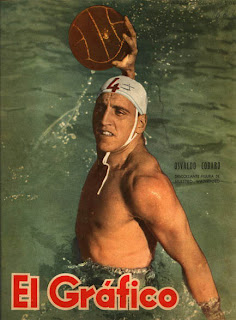
- Codaro on the cover of a 1950 issue of El Gráfico

Personal information
- Born: December 9, 1930; Avellaneda, Argentina
- Died: June 6, 2017 (aged 86); Rio de Janeiro, Brazil

Sport
- Sport: Water polo

Osvaldo Horacio Codaro Peirano (9 December 1930 – 6 June 2017) was an Argentine water polo player who competed in the 1948 Summer Olympics, in the 1952 Summer Olympics, and in the 1960 Summer Olympics.

Codaro served as President of the Argentine Water Polo Federation from 1985 to 1988. He was inducted into the International Swimming Hall of Fame in 2017.
