= Colin French =

Australian water polo player

Personal information
- Nationality: Australian
- Born: 20 November 1916; Collingwood, Victoria, Australia
- Died: 27 March 1984 (aged 67); Geelong, Victoria, Australia

Sport
- Sport: Water polo

Colin French (20 November 1916 – 27 March 1984) was an Australian water polo player. He competed in the men's tournament at the 1948 Summer Olympics. He also won the gold medal with the Australian team in the exhibition event at the 1950 British Empire Games.
