= Hugo Prono =

Argentine water polo player (1923–1970)

Personal information
- Born: February 23, 1923 Santa Fe, Argentina
- Died: January 6, 1970 (aged 46)

Sport
- Sport: Water polo

Hugo Prono (23 February 1923 – 6 January 1970) was an Argentine former water polo player who competed in the 1948 Summer Olympics.
