= Eric Johnston (water polo) =

Australian water polo player

Personal information
- Nationality: Australian
- Born: Percy Eric Johnston; 24 February 1914 Leichhardt, New South Wales, Australia
- Died: 16 March 2005 (aged 91) Sydney, Australia

Sport
- Sport: Water polo

Percy Eric Johnston (24 February 1914 – 16 March 2005) was an Australian water polo player. He competed in the men's tournament at the 1948 Summer Olympics.
