= Dezső Fábián =

Hungarian water polo player

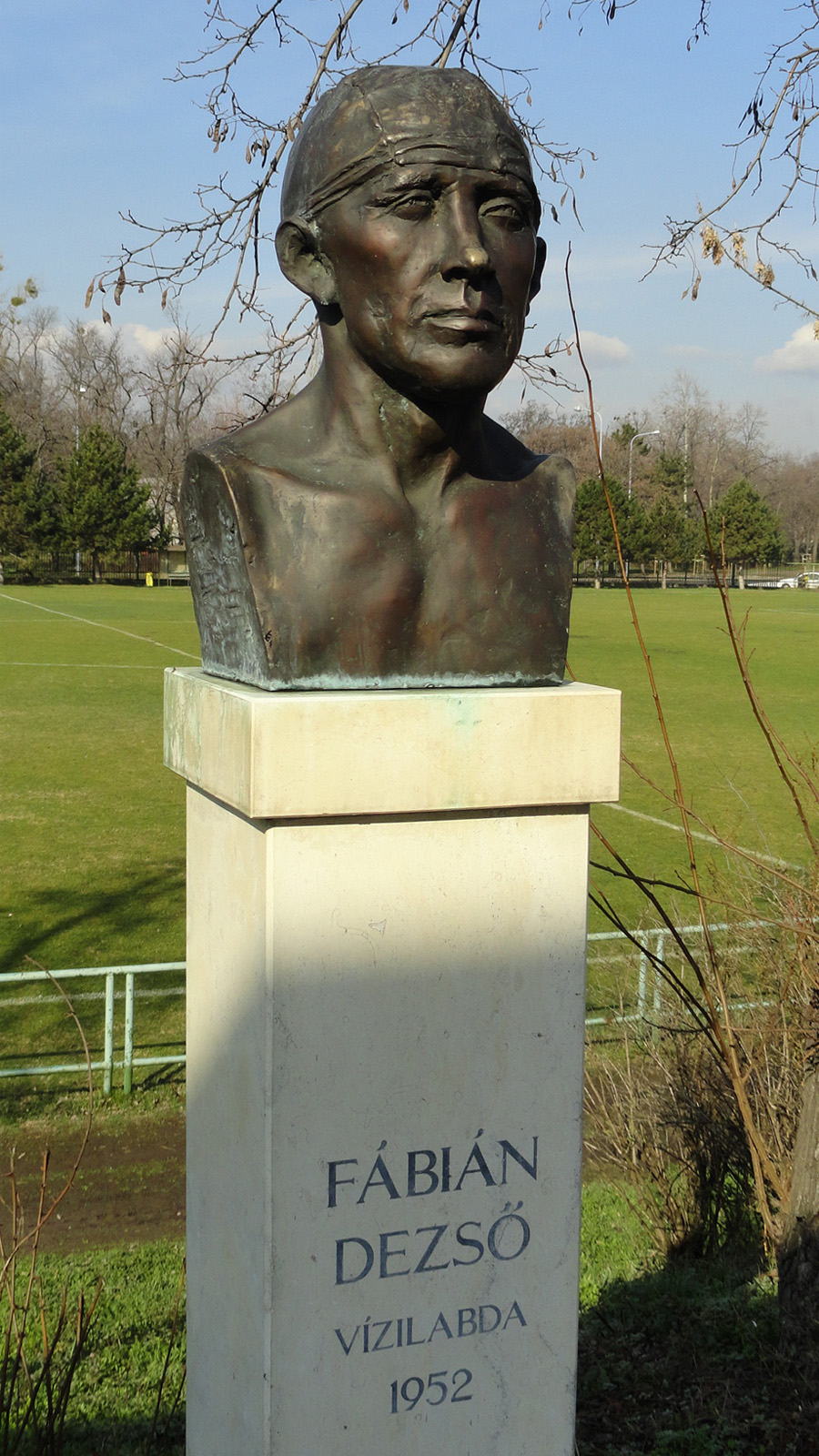

Personal information
- Born: December 17, 1918 Budapest, Austria-Hungary
- Died: October 6, 1973 (aged 54) Budapest, Hungary

Sport
- Sport: Water polo
Medal record
Representing Hungary
Olympic Games
Gold medal – first place	1952 Helsinki	Team competition
Silver medal – second place	1948 London	Team competition

Dezső Fábián (17 December 1918 – 6 October 1973) was a Hungarian water polo player who competed in the 1948 Summer Olympics and in the 1952 Summer Olympics.

Fábián was part of the Hungarian team which won the silver medal in the 1948 tournament. He played three matches.

Four years later he was a member of the Hungarian team which won the gold medal in the Olympic tournament. He played one match.

== See also ==
- Hungary men's Olympic water polo team records and statistics
- List of Olympic champions in men's water polo
- List of Olympic medalists in water polo (men)
