= Carlos Visentín =

Argentine water polo player (1918–2017)

Personal information
- Born: November 28, 1918
- Died: October 12, 2017 (aged 98)

Sport
- Sport: Water polo

Carlos Alberto Visentín (28 November 1918 – 12 October 2017) was an Argentine water polo player who competed in the 1948 Summer Olympics and in the 1952 Summer Olympics. Visentín died in October 2017 at the age of 98.
