= Jenő Brandi =

Hungarian water polo player (1913–1980)

Personal information
- Born: 13 May 1913 Budapest, Austria-Hungary
- Died: 4 December 1980 (aged 67) Budapest, Hungary

Sport
- Sport: Water polo
Medal record
Representing Hungary
Olympic Games
Gold medal – first place	1936 Berlin	Team competition
Silver medal – second place	1948 London	Team competition

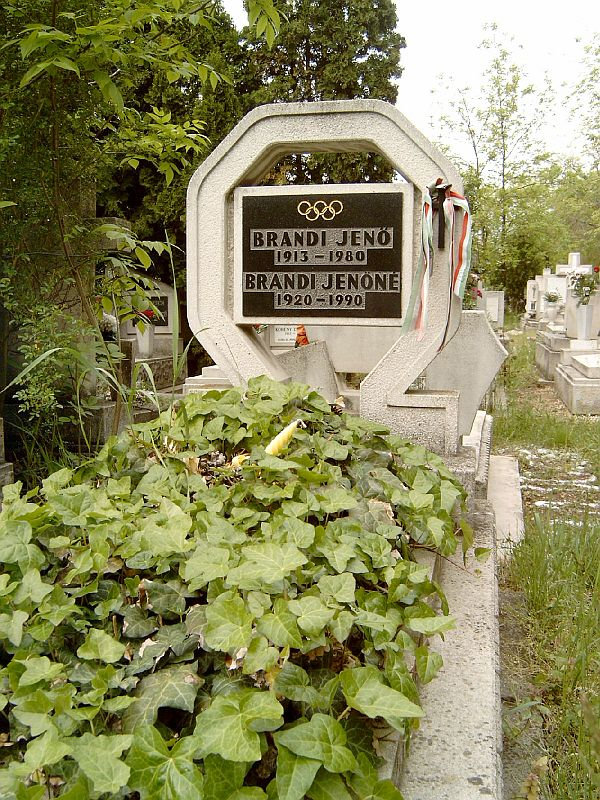

Jenő Brandi (13 May 1913 – 4 December 1980) was a Hungarian water polo player who competed in the 1936 Summer Olympics and in the 1948 Summer Olympics.

In 1936 he was part of the Hungarian team which won the gold medal. He played six matches including the final.

Twelve years later he won the silver medal with the Hungarian team. At the London Games he played three matches.

== See also ==
- Hungary men's Olympic water polo team records and statistics
- List of Olympic champions in men's water polo
- List of Olympic medalists in water polo (men)
