= Les McKay =

Australian water polo player

Personal information
- Nationality: Australian
- Born: 27 May 1917; Waverley, New South Wales, Australia
- Died: 22 March 1981 (aged 63)

Sport
- Sport: Water polo

Les McKay (27 May 1917 – 22 March 1981) was an Australian water polo player. He competed in the men's tournament at the 1948 Summer Olympics.

He was given the honour to carry the national flag of Australia at the opening ceremony of the 1948 Summer Olympics in London, becoming the fifth water polo player to be a flag bearer at the opening and closing ceremonies of the Olympics.

== See also ==
- Australia men's Olympic water polo team records and statistics
