= Rubén Maidana =

Argentine water polo player (1923–2015)

Personal information
- Born: January 12, 1923; Santa Fe, Argentina
- Died: October 8, 2015 (aged 92); Buenos Aires, Argentina

Sport
- Sport: Water polo

Rubén Maidana (12 January 1923 – 8 October 2015) was an Argentine former water polo player who competed in the 1948 Summer Olympics and was in the squad for the 1952 Summer Olympics but did not play.
