= Ladislao Szabo =

Argentine water polo player (1923–c. 1998

Personal information
- Born: Ladislao Szabo Klein; 11 April 1923 Budapest, Hungary
- Died: in or before 1998

Sport
- Sport: Water polo

Ladislao Szabo Klein (Hungarian: Szabo Laszlo; 11 April 1923 – in or before 1998) was a Hungarian-born Argentine water polo player who competed in the 1948 Summer Olympics and in the 1952 Summer Olympics. He was born in Budapest. Szabo died in or before 1998.
