= José Alonso (sport shooter) =

Spanish sports shooter

Personal information
- Full name: José Amador Alonso Sillero
- Born: 11 May 1919 Montalbán de Córdoba, Spain
- Died: 12 April 1988 (aged 68) Montalbán de Córdoba, Spain

Sport
- Sport: Sports shooting

José Alonso (11 May 1919 – 4 December 1988) was a Spanish sports shooter. He competed in the 25 m pistol event at the 1948 Summer Olympics.
