= Arthur Burge =

Australian water polo player

Personal information
- Nationality: Australian
- Born: 24 August 1917; Sydney, Australia
- Died: 20 February 1995 (aged 77); Mount Eliza, Victoria, Australia

Sport
- Sport: Water polo

Arthur Burge (24 August 1917 – 20 February 1995) was an Australian water polo player. He competed in the men's tournament at the 1948 Summer Olympics.
