= Oszkár Csuvik =

Hungarian water polo player

Personal information
- Born: March 28, 1925 Budapest, Hungary
- Died: October 23, 2008 (aged 83) Sydney, Australia

Sport
- Sport: Water polo
Medal record
Representing Hungary
Olympic Games
Silver medal – second place	1948 London	Team competition

Oszkár Csuvik (28 March 1925 – 23 October 2008) was a Hungarian water polo player who competed in the 1948 Summer Olympics.

== Biography ==
He was born in Budapest. He was part of the Hungarian team which won the silver medal, and he played five matches. He coached for the Australian water polo team in 1952 Summer Olympics.

== See also ==
- List of Olympic medalists in water polo (men)
