= Agustín Mestres =

Spanish water polo player (1923–1999)

Personal information
- Full name: Agustín Mestres Rivas
- Nationality: Spanish
- Born: 5 February 1923; Barcelona, Spain
- Died: 28 July 1999 (aged 76); Barcelona, Spain

Sport
- Sport: Water polo

Agustín Mestres Rivas (Note: In this Spanish name, the first or paternal surname is Mestres and the second or maternal family name is Rivas.) (Catalan: Agustí Mestres i Ribas, 5 February 1923 – 28 July 1999) was a Spanish water polo player. He competed at the 1948 Summer Olympics and the 1952 Summer Olympics.
