= Cycling at the 1948 Summer Olympics – Men's team pursuit =

Cycling - Men's team pursuit at the Games of the XIV Olympiad
- Venue: Herne Hill Velodrome, London
- Dates: 7–9 August 1948
- Competitors: 59 from 15 nations

Medalists
1st place, gold medalist(s)		Charles Coste, Serge Blusson, Fernand Decanali, Pierre Adam; France
2nd place, silver medalist(s)		Arnaldo Benfenati, Guido Bernardi, Anselmo Citterio, Rino Pucci; Italy
3rd place, bronze medalist(s)		Alan Geldard, Tommy Godwin, David Ricketts, Wilfred Waters; Great Britain

The men's team pursuit cycling event at the 1948 Summer Olympics took place on 7 to 9 August and was one of six events at the 1948 Olympics.

== Results ==
=== First round ===
The first round took place on 7 August. The winning team from each heat advanced to the quarterfinals. Since the number of teams made it impossible for the Finnish team to compete against another team, it was determined that their time must beat that of the fastest losing team in the first round to advance to the quarterfinals. Since Australia's 5:06.05 time beat Finland's 5:17.4 time, Australia advanced to the quarterfinals.

Heat 1

Rank	Name	Nationality	Time
1	Alan Geldard; Tommy Godwin; David Ricketts; Wilfred Waters	Great Britain	5:12.7
2	Lorne Atkinson; William Hamilton; Lance Pugh; Laurent Tessier	Canada	5:38.2

Heat 2

Rank	Name	Nationality	Time
1	Charles Coste; Serge Blusson; Fernand Decanali; Pierre Adam	France	5:03.6
2	Walter Freitag; Hans Goldschmid; Josef Pohnetal; Heinrich Schiebel	Austria	5:18.8

Heat 3

Rank	Name	Nationality	Time
1	Walter Bucher; Gaston Gerosa; Eugen Kamber; Hans Pfenninger	Switzerland	5:13.8
2	Roberto Guerrero; Julio Alba; Ambrosio Aimar; Enrique Molina	Argentina	5:17.1

Heat 4

Rank	Name	Nationality	Time
1	Arnaldo Benfenati; Guido Bernardi; Anselmo Citterio; Rino Pucci	Italy	5:10.2
2	Adi Havewala; Jehangoo Amin; Rohinton Noble; Piloo Sarkari	India	6:00.5

Heat 5

Rank	Name	Nationality	Time
1	Jos De Beukelaere; Maurice Blomme; Georges Van Brabant; Raphael Glorieux	Belgium	5:05.5
2	Al Stiller; Thomas Montemage; Ted Smith	United States	5:22.5

Heat 6

Rank	Name	Nationality	Time
1	Max Jørgensen; Børge Gissel; Børge Mortensen; Benny Schnoor	Denmark	5:04.1
2	Sid Patterson; Jim Nestor; Jack Hoobin; Russell Mockridge	Australia	5:06.05

=== Quarterfinals ===
Heat 1

Rank	Name	Nationality	Time
1	Charles Coste; Serge Blusson; Fernand Decanali; Pierre Adam	France	5:00.5
2	Walter Bucher; Gaston Gerosa; Eugen Kamber; Hans Pfenninger	Switzerland	5:09.2

Heat 2

Rank	Name	Nationality	Time
1	Alan Geldard; Tommy Godwin; David Ricketts; Wilfred Waters	Great Britain	5:02.9
2	Max Jørgensen; Børge Gissel; Børge Mortensen; Benny Schnoor	Denmark	5:05.6

Heat 3

Rank	Name	Nationality	Time
1	Charles Coste; Serge Blusson; Fernand Decanali; Pierre Adam	Italy	4:59.0
2	Walter Bucher; Gaston Gerosa; Eugen Kamber; Hans Pfenninger	Belgium	5:05.7

Heat 4

Rank	Name	Nationality	Time
1	Atilio François; Juan de Armas; Luis Ángel de los Santos; Waldemar Bernatzky	Uruguay	5:03.5
2	Sid Patterson; Jim Nestor; Jack Hoobin; Russell Mockridge	Australia	5:07.7

=== Semifinals ===
Heat 1

Rank	Name	Nationality	Time
1	Charles Coste; Serge Blusson; Fernand Decanali; Pierre Adam	France	4:54.4
2	Alan Geldard; Tommy Godwin; David Ricketts; Wilfred Waters	Great Britain	4:59.1

Heat 2

Rank	Name	Nationality	Time
1	Arnaldo Benfenati; Guido Bernardi; Anselmo Citterio; Rino Pucci	Italy	5:00.5
2	Atilio François; Juan de Armas; Luis Ángel de los Santos; Waldemar Bernatzky	Uruguay	5:06.3

=== Final ===
Gold medal race

Rank	Name	Nationality	Time
1st place, gold medalist(s)	Charles Coste; Serge Blusson; Fernand Decanali; Pierre Adam	France	4:57.8
2nd place, silver medalist(s)	Arnaldo Benfenati; Guido Bernardi; Anselmo Citterio; Rino Pucci	Italy	5:36.7

Bronze medal race

Rank	Name	Nationality	Time
3rd place, bronze medalist(s)	Alan Geldard; Tommy Godwin; David Ricketts; Wilfred Waters	Great Britain	4:55.8
4	Atilio François; Juan de Armas; Luis Ángel de los Santos; Waldemar Bernatzky	Uruguay	5:04.4

== Final standings ==
Rank	Name	Nationality
1st place, gold medalist(s)	Charles Coste; Serge Blusson; Fernand Decanali; Pierre Adam	France
2nd place, silver medalist(s)	Arnaldo Benfenati; Guido Bernardi; Anselmo Citterio; Rino Pucci	Italy
3rd place, bronze medalist(s)	Alan Geldard; Tommy Godwin; David Ricketts; Wilfred Waters	Great Britain
4	Atilio François; Juan de Armas; Luis Ángel de los Santos; Waldemar Bernatzky	Uruguay
5	Sid Patterson; Jim Nestor; Jack Hoobin; Russell Mockridge	Australia
5	Jos De Beukelaere; Maurice Blomme; Georges Van Brabant; Raphael Glorieux	Belgium
5	Max Jørgensen; Børge Gissel; Børge Mortensen; Benny Schnoor	Denmark
5	Walter Bucher; Gaston Gerosa; Eugen Kamber; Hans Pfenninger	Switzerland
9	Onni Kasslin; Paavo Kuusinen; Erkki Koskinen; Torvald Högström	Finland
9	Lorne Atkinson; William Hamilton; Lance Pugh; Laurent Tessier	Canada
9	Walter Freitag; Hans Goldschmid; Josef Pohnetal; Heinrich Schiebel	Austria
9	Roberto Guerrero; Julio Alba; Ambrosio Aimar; Enrique Molina	Argentina
9	Adi Havewala; Jehangoo Amin; Rohinton Noble; Piloo Sarkari	India
9	Gerrit Voorting; Joop Harmans; Theo Blankenaauw; Henk Faanhof	Netherlands
9	Al Stiller; Thomas Montemage; Ted Smith	United States
