= Cycling at the 1950 British Empire Games =

- Venue: Western Springs Stadium
- Location: Auckland, New Zealand
- Dates: 4 – 11 February 1950

Cycling at the 1950 British Empire Games was the third appearance of Cycling at the Commonwealth Games. The track events took place at Western Springs Stadium, which had a 10 foot high banked concrete outdoor track, 18 feet wide and 515 yards in circumference. The road race started on Tamaki Drive, progressed to Parnell and Ōrākei before finishing on Tamaki Drive.

Australia topped the cycling medal table with four gold medals.

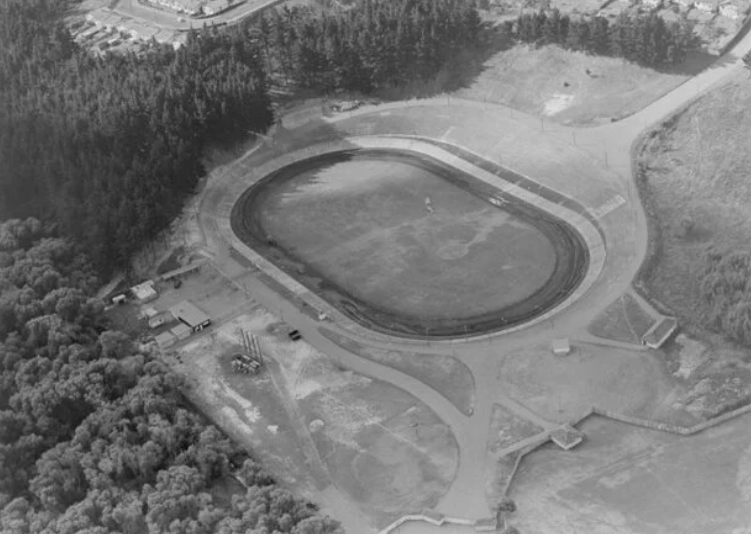
Aerial view of the Western Springs Stadium in January 1950. Whites Aviation

== Medal table ==
* Host nation (New Zealand)

Medals won by nation with totals, ranked by number of golds—sortable
Rank	Nation	Gold	Silver	Bronze	Total
1	Australia	4	3	2	9
2	England	1	0	1	2
3	New Zealand*	0	2	2	4
Totals (3 entries)		5	5	5	15

== Medal winners ==
Event	Gold	Silver	Bronze
Time Trial	Russell Mockridge; Australia	Sid Patterson; Australia	Tommy Godwin; England
Sprint 1000m	Russell Mockridge; Australia	Sid Patterson; Australia	Graham Avery; New Zealand
4000m Individual Pursuit	Cyril Cartwright; England	Russell Mockridge; Australia	Les Lock; New Zealand
10-mile Scratch	Bill Heseltine; Australia	Les Lock; New Zealand	Ken Caves; Australia
Road race	Hector Sutherland; Australia	Nick Carter; New Zealand	Jack Fowler; Australia

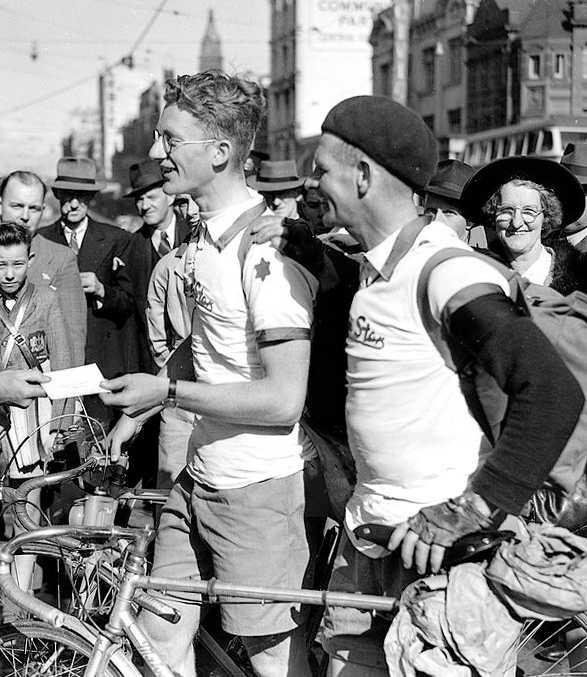
Russell Mockridge (left)

== 1,000m sprint championship ==
First Round

- (Australia) Russell Mockridge bt (New Zealand) Allen Stonex
- (Australia) Sid Patterson bt (Canada) Lorne Atkinson
- (New Zealand) Graham Avery bt (Canada) Erick Oland
- (New Zealand) Don Olive bt (Southern Rhodesia) E. Evans
- (England) Tommy Godwin bt (Australia) Charlie Bazzano
- (Southern Rhodesia) D. K. Bennett bt (England) Alan Geldard

Repechage

- Bazzano bt Stonex & Evans 13.7 sec

Quarter finals

- Mockridge bt Bennett 2–0
- Patterson bt Stonex 2–0
- Avery bt Bazzano 2–0
- Olive bt Godwin 2–0

Semi finals

- Mockridge bt Olive 2–0
- Patterson bt Avery 2–0

Third place

- Avery bt Olive 2–1

Final

- Mockridge bt Patterson 2–0

== 1,000m Time Trial ==
Pos	Athlete	Time
1	(Australia) Russell Mockridge	1:13.4 mins
2	(Australia) Sid Patterson	1:13.5 mins
3	(England) Tommy Godwin	1:13.6 mins
4	(England) Cyril Cartwright	1:15.1 mins
5	(New Zealand) Les Lock	1:16.2 mins
6	(England) Alan Geldard	1:16.5 mins
8	(New Zealand) Graham Hughes	1:17.1 mins
9	(Canada) John Millman	1:18.2 mins
10	(Southern Rhodesia) D. K. Bennett	1:18.6 mins
11	(Southern Rhodesia) E. Evans	1:18.8 mins
12	(Australia) Robert Carmichael	1:19.5 mins
13	(Canada) William Hamilton	1:19.8 mins
14	(Southern Rhodesia) E. P. Branfield	1:19.9 mins
15	(Canada) Lorne Atkinson	1:20.0 mins

== 4,000 metres individual purusit ==
Heats (top 4 times qualify for semi-finals)

- (England) Cyril Cartwright 5:26.7 bt (Canada) William Hamilton 5:43.0 (lapped)
- (Australia) Russell Mockridge 5:40.0 bt (Southern Rhodesia) E. P. Branfield 5:48.1
- (Scotland) Jimmy Hamilton 5:26.7 bt (New Zealand) Les Lock 5:29.6
- (Wales) Malcolm Campbell 5:40.4 (rode alone)

Semi-finals

- Cartwright 5.21.2 bt Lock 5.34.0
- Mockridge 5.28.0 bt Hamilton 5.29.8

Third place

- Lock 5.26.7 bt Hamilton 5.28.2

Final

- Cartwright 5:16.3 bt Mockridge 5:27.0

== 10 mile scratch race ==
Pos	Athlete	Time
1	(Australia) Bill Heseltine	23:23.4
2	(New Zealand) Les Lock	
3	(Australia) Ken Caves	
	(Australia) Barry Coombs	
	(Canada) Erick Oland	
	(Canada) John Millman	
	(Canada) Lorne Atkinson	
	(England) Tommy Godwin	
	(England) Cyril Cartwright	
	(England) Alan Geldard	
	(New Zealand) Alan C. Dean	
	(New Zealand) Frank Tredrea	
	(Scotland) Jimmy Hamilton	
	(Wales) Malcolm Campbell	
	(Southern Rhodesia) D. K. Bennett	
	(Southern Rhodesia) E. Evans	
	(Southern Rhodesia) E. P. Branfield	

== 100km Road Race ==
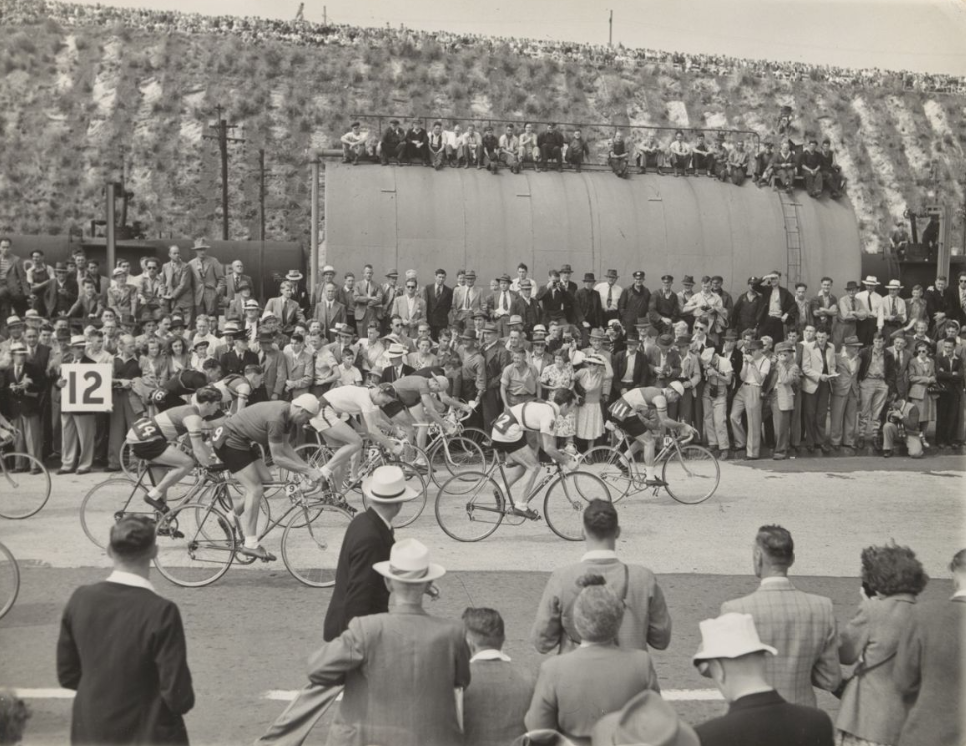
The 100km road race travelling west along Tāmaki Drive

Only 7 of the 13 starters finished.

Pos	Athlete	Time
1	(Australia) Hector Sutherland	3'13:06.4
2	(New Zealand) Nick Carter	3'13:06.5
3	(Australia) Jack Hartley Fowler	3'13:06.6
4	(Australia) Peter Pryor	3'13:06.7
5	(Wales) Malcolm Campbell	3'13:06.8
6	(England) Alf Newman	3'13:07.2
7	(New Zealand) James Downie	no time
	(England) Eric Holroyd	dnf
	(Canada) Lorne Atkinson	dnf
	(Canada) William Hamilton	dnf
	(Southern Rhodesia) E. P. Branfield	dnf
	(Scotland) Jimmy Hamilton	dnf
	(New Zealand) Ted Lambert	dnf

== See also ==
- List of Commonwealth Games medallists in cycling
