= Gerosa (surname) =

Gerosa is a surname. Notable people with the surname include:

- Augusto Gerosa (1909-?), Italian ice hockey player
- Carlo Gerosa (born 1964), Italian alpine skier
- Gaston Gerosa (born 1923), Swiss cyclist
- Lawrence E. Gerosa (1894–1972), Italian-born American politician
- Mario Gerosa (born 1967), Argentine-born Italian rugby union player
- Mauro Gerosa (born 1974), Italian racing cyclist
- Vincenza Gerosa (1784–1847), Italian Roman Catholic nun
