= David Ricketts =

David Ricketts may refer to:

- Dave Ricketts (1935–2008), American baseball player
- David Ricketts (cyclist) (1920–1996), British cyclist
- David Ricketts (musician) (born 1953), American musician and record producer
