= Malcolm Campbell (disambiguation) =

Malcolm Campbell (1885–1948) was a British racing motorist and motoring journalist.

Malcolm Campbell may also refer to:

- Malcolm Campbell (cricketer) (1881–1967), Australian cricketer
- Malcolm Campbell (mayor), New Zealand mayor
- Malcolm Campbell-Johnston (1871–1938), British barrister and politician
- Malcolm Campbell (cyclist), Welsh Empire Games cyclist

== See also ==
- Malcolm Campbell High School, a high school in Montreal, Canada, between 1960 and 1987
