= Walter Freitag =

Walter Freitag may refer to:

- Walter Freitag (cyclist)
- Walter Freitag (politician)
