= Wilfred Waters =

English cyclist

Personal information
- Full name: Wilfred Waters
- Born: 4 January 1923 Wandsworth, Surrey, England
- Died: 1 April 2006 (aged 83) Surrey, England

Cycling career
- Sport: Cycling
- Discipline: Track
- Role: Rider

Amateur team
- South London RC: 1947–1950
Medal record
Representing Great Britain
Men's track cycling
Summer Olympics
Bronze medal – third place	1948 London	Team pursuit

Wilfred Waters (4 January 1923 –1 April 2006), or sometimes referred to as Wilfrid Waters, was a British racing cyclist, one of the top British riders in the 1940s. A member of the South London RC, he competed at many national track events including the Grand Prix of the City of Manchester, where he rode against Reg Harris amongst others. There he also paired up with R Waters to finish third in the madison. Based on his successes, Waters was selected to compete at the 1948 Summer Olympics.

Waters won the bronze medal as a member of the British team pursuit squad at the 1948 Summer Olympics. Other team pursuit squad members were Robert Geldard, Tommy Godwin and David Ricketts.

In 1950, Waters became the 880 yards Scottish Grass Track Champion.

Waters died in early 2006 at the age of 83 in Surrey, England.

== Palmarès ==
1948
3rd Team pursuit, 1948 Summer Olympics

1950
1st 880 yards, Scottish National Grass Track Championships
