= Kuusinen (surname) =

Kuusinen is a Finnish surname. Notable people with the surname include:

- Otto Wille Kuusinen (1881–1964), Finnish-born Soviet communist, literary historian, politician and poet
- Aino Kuusinen (1886–1970), Finnish Communist
- Hertta Kuusinen (1904–1974), Finnish Communist politician
- Paavo Kuusinen (1914–1979), Finnish cyclist
