= Jimmy Hamilton (cyclist) =

Scottish cyclist

Jimmy Campbell
Personal information
- Nationality: British (Scottish)
- Born: Scotland

Sport
- Sport: Cycling
- Event(s): Track and Road
- Club: Fullarton Wheelers

Jimmy Hamilton is a former racing cyclist from Scotland, who represented Scotland at the British Empire Games (now Commonwealth Games).

== Biography ==
Hamilton, born Scotland, was a member of the Fullarton Wheelers Cycling Club of Irvine, North Ayrshire. In July 1949 he broke the Scottish 50 miles record and eight days later broke the 100 miles record, setting a time of 4hrs, 20mins 18sec.

At the 1950 British Empire Games in Auckland, New Zealand, he represented the Scottish team as the sole cyclist at the games and participated in the Road Race, 10 mile scratch and 4,000 metres pursuit events.

Hamilton was the sole Scottish cyclist attending the Games and lost the bronze medale play off to Les Lock in the pursuit, despite the fact that he had already beaten Lock in the heats. In the 100 km road race he fell before pulling out.

Hamilton was also the 1952 Scottish all-round champion.
