= Luis Ángel de los Santos =

Uruguayan cyclist 1925–2010

Luis Ángel Fernando de los Santos Grossi
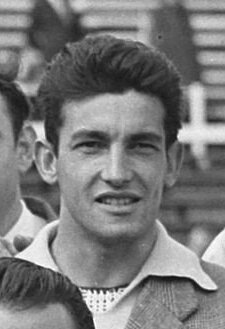
- De los Santos in 1948

Personal information
- Full name: Luis Ángel Fernando de los Santos Grossi
- Nickname: El Pocho
- Born: 8 June 1925 Montevideo, Uruguay
- Died: 30 August 2010 (aged 85) Montevideo, Uruguay

Cycling career
- Sport: Cycling
- Disciplines: Road, Track
- Role: Rider, Coach
- Rider type: Sprinter, Pursuit

Amateur team
- 1940s–1950s: Maroñas, Fénix, Belvedere, Nacional

Major wins
- Winner of the Six Days of Montevideo (1959)

Luis Ángel Fernando de los Santos Grossi (8 June 1925 – 30 August 2010), also known as "Pocho" de los Santos, was a Uruguayan cyclist, coach, and sports journalist. He is regarded as one of the leading figures in the history of Uruguayan cycling.

== Career ==
De los Santos was born in the Cerrito de la Victoria neighborhood of Montevideo in 1925, though he spent part of his childhood in Maldonado, which led many to consider him fernandino. He competed for clubs such as Maroñas, Fénix, Belvedere, and Nacional during the 1940s and 1950s.

His breakthrough year was 1948, when he reached the semifinals in the London Olympics and the quarterfinals at the Track Cycling World Championships in Amsterdam, where he raced against eventual world champion Mario Ghella.

At the 1952 Summer Olympics in Helsinki, he competed in both road and track cycling events. He finished 38th in the individual road race, and 13th with the Uruguayan team in the road race by nations. On the track, he finished 19th in the kilometre time trial and reached the quarterfinals of the 4,000 metres team pursuit, placing 12th overall.

In addition to his Olympic appearances as a rider, he later served as coach of the Uruguayan cycling team at the 1956 Melbourne and 1960 Rome Games. He was also a key figure in the Vuelta Ciclista del Uruguay, remembered especially for his duels with Atilio Francois.

== Six Days of Montevideo ==
After having retired in the late 1950s, de los Santos returned to competition to race the Six Days of Montevideo in 1959 at the Velódromo Municipal. Known for his dedication, he prepared by training daily at home on rollers—even while watching television with his family. His preparation proved successful: partnered with Argentine rider Antonio Alexandre, he won the event.

== Later life ==
Following his career as a cyclist, de los Santos worked as a commentator for radio and television in Uruguay. He also directed a cycling school at the Velódromo Municipal in Montevideo, where he trained younger generations of riders.

He remained a reference point for Uruguayan cycling until his death in 2010 at the age of 85.

== Olympic results ==
=== 1948 Summer Olympics, London ===
- Track cycling – Team pursuit, 4,000 m: 4th place with Uruguay

=== 1952 Summer Olympics, Helsinki ===
- Road cycling – Individual road race: 38th place
- Road cycling – Team road race: 13th place with Uruguay
- Track cycling – Kilometre time trial: 19th place
- Track cycling – Team pursuit, 4,000 m: 12th place (eliminated in quarterfinals)

== Legacy ==
Luis Ángel de los Santos was a Uruguayan cyclist who competed at the Olympic Games and in national competitions. He later worked as a cycling coach, Journalist and Educator.
