= Roberto Guerrero (cyclist) =

Argentine cyclist

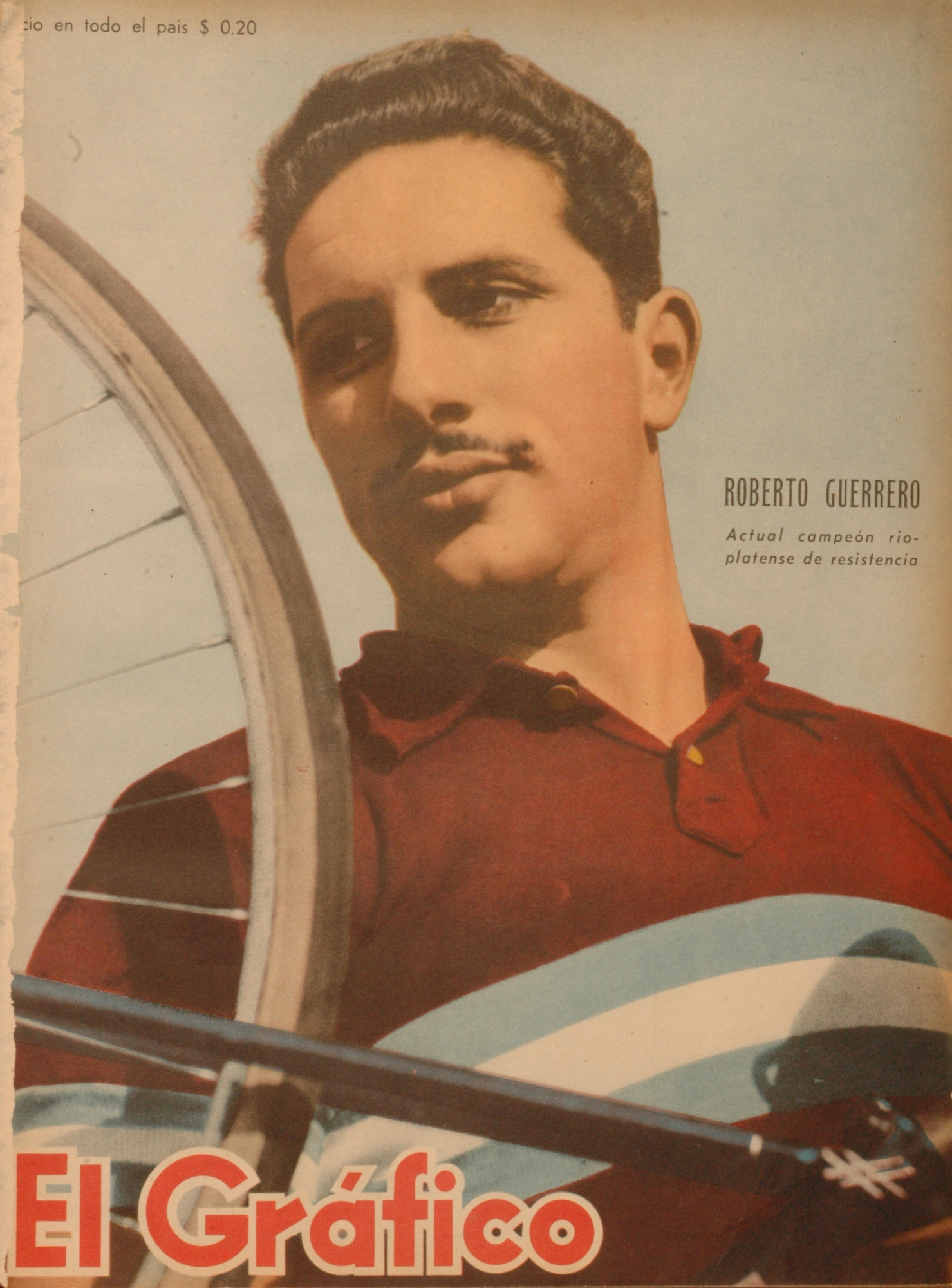
- Guerrero, circa 1945

Personal information
- Born: 10 October 1923 Buenos Aires, Argentina
- Died: 10 July 2011 (aged 87) Medellín, Colombia

Cycling career
- Sport: Cycling

Roberto Guerrero (10 October 1923 – 10 July 2011) was an Argentine cyclist. He competed in the team pursuit event at the 1948 Summer Olympics.
