= Cosme Saavedra =

Argentine cyclist

Cosme Damián Saavedra
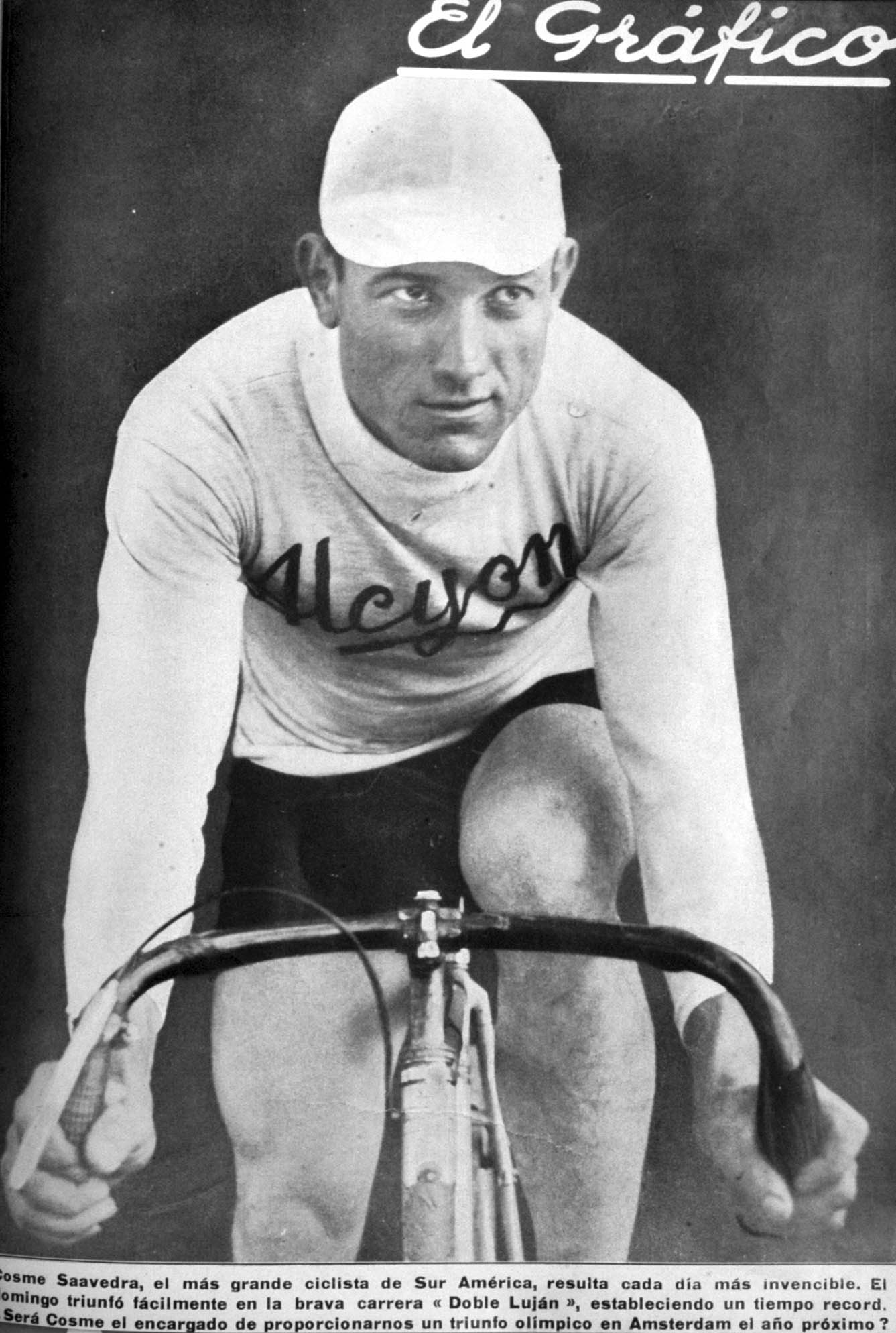

Personal information
- Born: 27 September 1901 Godoy Cruz, Mendoza, Argentina
- Died: 3 July 1967 (aged 65) Buenos Aires, Argentina

Cycling career
- Sport: Cycling
- Discipline: Cycling

Amateur team
- Alcyon - Dunlop

Cosme Damián Saavedra (27 September 1901 – 3 July 1967) was an Argentine cyclist. He competed in three events at the 1924 Summer Olympics and two events at the 1928 Summer Olympics.
