= Eric Holroyd =

English cyclist (1916-2005)

Personal information
- Nationality: British/New Zealander
- Born: 11 August 1916 Sheffield, England
- Died: 2005 (aged 88–89) New Zealand

Sport
- Sport: Cycling
- Event: Track
- Club: Norwood Paragon CC

Eric Holroyd (11 August 1916 – 2005) was a male athlete who competed for England at the 1950 British Empire Games (now Commonwealth Games).

== Biography ==
Holroyd rode for Norwood Paragon CC and was considered for the 1948 Summer Olympics.

Holroyd represented the English team at the 1950 British Empire Games in Auckland, New Zealand in the cycling road race at the 1950 British Empire Games in Auckland, New Zealand.

He was the first member of the team to arrive in Auckland because he wished to live in New Zealand and arrived under the assisted immigration scheme. He had befriended New Zealand cyclist Allen Stone at the cycling world championships and agreed to stay with Stone when he arrived in New Zealand.
