= Eugen Kamber =

Swiss cyclist

Personal information
- Born: 18 September 1924 Hägendorf, Switzerland
- Died: 1 March 1991 (aged 66)

Cycling career
- Sport: Cycling

Eugen Kamber (18 September 1924 – 1 March 1991) was a Swiss cyclist. He competed in the team pursuit event at the 1948 Summer Olympics.
