= Julia Sanchez Parma =

Argentine cyclist

Personal information
- Born: 14 December 1990 (age 35)

Cycling career
- Sport: Cycling
- Discipline: Road
- Role: Rider

Professional teams
- 2015: Itau Shimano Ladies Power Team
- 2016: Xirayas de San Luis–OPW

Julia Sanchez Parma (born 14 December 1990) is an Argentine racing cyclist. She finished on the podium in the Argentine National Road Race Championships every year from 2013 to 2015, winning the race in 2015.

== See also ==
- List of 2015 UCI Women's Teams and riders
