= Ernesto Contreras (cyclist) =

Argentine cyclist (1937–2020)

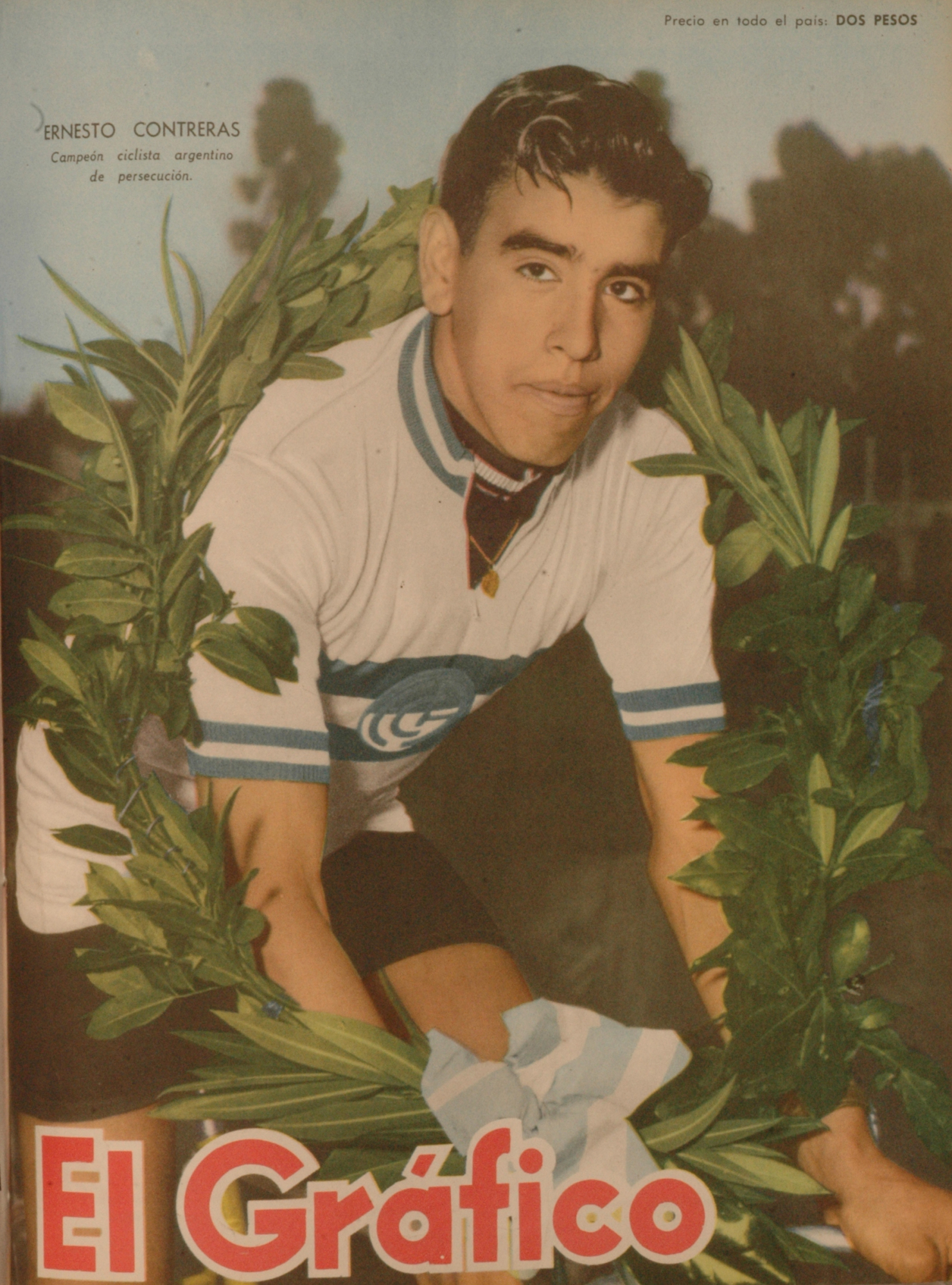
- Contreras in El Gráfico, 1956

Personal information
- Full name: Ernesto Antonio Contreras Vásquez
- Nickname: El Cóndor de América
- Born: 19 June 1937 Mendoza, Argentina
- Died: 25 October 2020 (aged 83) Mendoza, Argentina

Cycling career
- Sport: Cycling
- Disciplines: Road; Track
- Role: Rider

Ernesto Antonio Contreras Vásquez (19 June 1937 – 25 October 2020) was an Argentine cyclist. He competed at the 1960, 1964 and the 1968 Summer Olympics. He also won the Argentine National Road Race Championships in 1959, 1970 and 1971, as well as eight consecutive national pursuit championships from 1956 to 1963.

Contreras originally wanted to be a footballer, but began cycling at the age of 19 after borrowing a bicycle. He died in 2020 at the age of 83, after being hospitalized for a heart attack and also testing positive for COVID-19. He was 83.
