= Ambrosio Aimar =

Argentine cyclist

Personal information
- Full name: Ambrosio Nicolás Aimar
- Born: 15 July 1923 San Francisco, Argentina
- Died: 12 September 2007 (aged 84)

Cycling career
- Sport: Cycling

Ambrosio Nicolás Aimar (15 July 1923 – 12 September 2007) was an Argentine cyclist. He competed in the team pursuit event at the 1948 Summer Olympics.
