= Max Jørgensen =

Danish cyclist

Personal information
- Born: 9 April 1923 Kildebrønde, Greve Municipality, Denmark
- Died: 26 November 1992 (aged 69)

Cycling career
- Sport: Cycling

Max Jørgensen (9 April 1923 – 26 November 1992) was a Danish cyclist. He competed in the team pursuit event at the 1948 Summer Olympics.
