= Børge Mortensen =

Danish cyclist

Personal information
- Born: 3 November 1921 Aarhus, Denmark
- Died: 16 October 2005 (aged 83) Aarhus, Denmark

Cycling career
- Sport: Cycling

Børge Mortensen (3 November 1921 – 16 October 2005) was a Danish cyclist. He competed in the team pursuit event at the 1948 Summer Olympics.
