= Charles Coste =

French cyclist (1924–2025)

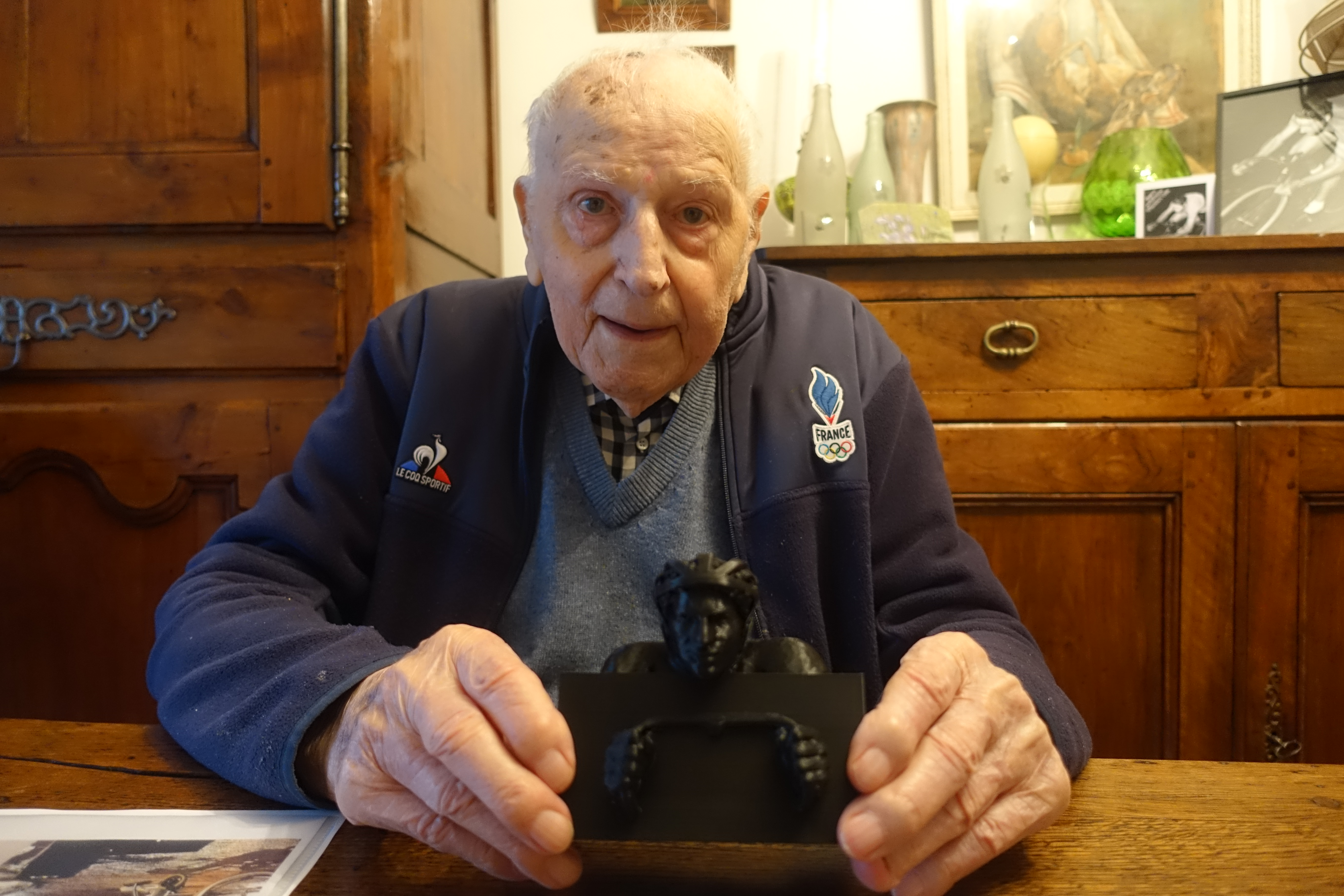
- Coste in 2024
- Born: 8 February 1924; Ollioules, France
- Died: 29 October 2025 (aged 101)
- Awards: Legion of Honour
- Cycling career
- Sport: Cycling
Medal record
Representing France
Men's cycling
Olympic Games
Gold medal – first place	1948 London	Team pursuit

Charles Coste (8 February 1924 – 29 October 2025) was a French cyclist, and an Olympic champion in team pursuit from 1948.

== Biography ==
Coste was born in Ollioules on 8 February 1924. He won a gold medal in the team pursuit at the 1948 Summer Olympics in London, together with Fernand Decanali, Pierre Adam and Serge Blusson. He won a bronze medal in individual pursuit at the 1948 UCI Track Cycling World Championships. He finished in fourth place in the 1950 Paris–Roubaix.

Coste turned 100 on 8 February 2024.

Coste was the oldest bearer of the 2024 Summer Olympics torch during the opening ceremony of the games in Paris. He lit the torches of the final pair of torch bearers, fellow French gold medallists Marie-José Pérec and Teddy Riner, who then lit the Olympic Cauldron. He was the oldest living French Olympic medal winner and had also been born in the year Paris last hosted the Summer Olympic Games. In January 2025, following the death of Ágnes Keleti, he became the oldest living Olympic champion.

After the death of French long jumper Yvonne Curtet in February 2025, Coste became the oldest living French Olympian, and the oldest survivor of the 1948 Summer Olympics.

Coste died on 29 October 2025, at the age of 101.
