= Oswaldo Frossasco =

Argentine cyclist (1952–2022)

Personal information
- Nickname: Colchón
- Born: 25 June 1952 Córdoba, Argentina
- Died: 2 April 2022 (aged 69) Córdoba, Argentina

Cycling career
- Sport: Cycling

Oswaldo Ramón Frossasco Grosso (25 June 1952 – 2 April 2022) was an Argentine cyclist. He competed in the individual road race and team time trial events at the 1976 Summer Olympics. He retired from cycling in 1987 and was the president of the Córdoba Cycling Federation at the time of his death.
