= Jos De Beukelaere =

Belgian cyclist

Personal information
- Born: 7 April 1925 Antwerp, Belgium
- Died: 5 November 1969 (aged 44) Antwerp, Belgium

Cycling career
- Sport: Cycling

Jos De Beukelaere (7 April 1925 – 5 November 1969) was a Belgian cyclist. He competed in the team pursuit event at the 1948 Summer Olympics.
