= Fernand Decanali =

French cyclist

Personal information
- Born: 7 July 1925 Marseille, France
- Died: 9 January 2017 (aged 91) Marseille, France

Cycling career
- Sport: Cycling
Medal record
Representing France
Men's cycling
Olympic Games
| Gold medal – first place | 1948 London | Team pursuit |

Fernand Decanali (7 July 1925 – 9 January 2017) was a French cyclist. He was born in Marseille, France. He won a gold medal in the team pursuit at the 1948 Summer Olympics in London together with Pierre Adam, Charles Coste, and Serge Blusson.
