= Serge Blusson =

French cyclist (1928–1994)

Personal information
- Born: 7 May 1928 Paris, France
- Died: 14 March 1994 (aged 65) Creil, France

Cycling career
- Sport: Cycling
Medal record
Representing France
Men's cycling
Olympic Games
Gold medal – first place	1948 London	Team pursuit

Serge Blusson (7 May 1928 – 14 March 1994) was a French cyclist. He was born in Paris. He won a gold medal in the team pursuit at the 1948 Summer Olympics in London, together with Pierre Adam, Charles Coste and Fernand Decanali. He finished in fifth place in the 1954 Paris–Roubaix.
