= James Downie (cyclist) =

New Zealand cyclist (1922–1995)

Personal information
- Full name: James Stewart Downie
- Born: 19 July 1922 Blenheim, New Zealand
- Died: 29 September 1995 (aged 73)

Cycling career
- Sport: Cycling

James Stewart Downie (19 July 1922 – 29 September 1995) was a New Zealand racing cyclist who represented his country at the 1950 British Empire Games in Auckland.

Born on 19 July 1922, Downie married Merle Bishell in 1944.

In the men's 100 km road race at the 1950 British Empire Games, Downie fell on the eighth lap of the 12-lap race after touching wheels with teammate Nick Carter, suffering abrasions and bleeding, but was able to catch up to the field by the end of the lap. He finished the race in seventh place, five seconds behind the winner.

Downie died on 29 September 1995.
