= Arnaldo Benfenati =

Italian cyclist (1924–1986)

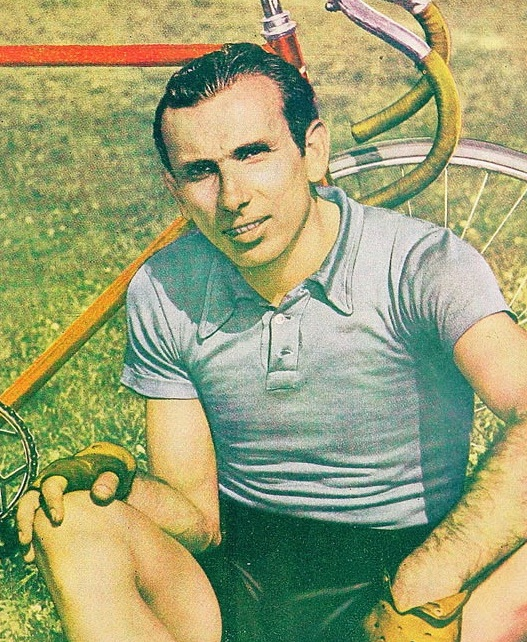

Personal information
- Born: 26 May 1924 Bologna, Italy
- Died: 9 June 1986 (aged 62) Bologna, Italy

Cycling career
- Sport: Cycling
Medal record
Men's cycling
Representing Italy
Olympic Games
Silver medal – second place	1948 London	Team pursuit

Arnaldo Benfenati (26 May 1924 – 9 June 1986) was an Italian cyclist. He was born in Bologna. He won a silver medal in team pursuit at the 1948 Summer Olympics in London, together with Rino Pucci, Anselmo Citterio and Guido Bernardi.
