= Anselmo Citterio =

Italian cyclist (1927–2006)

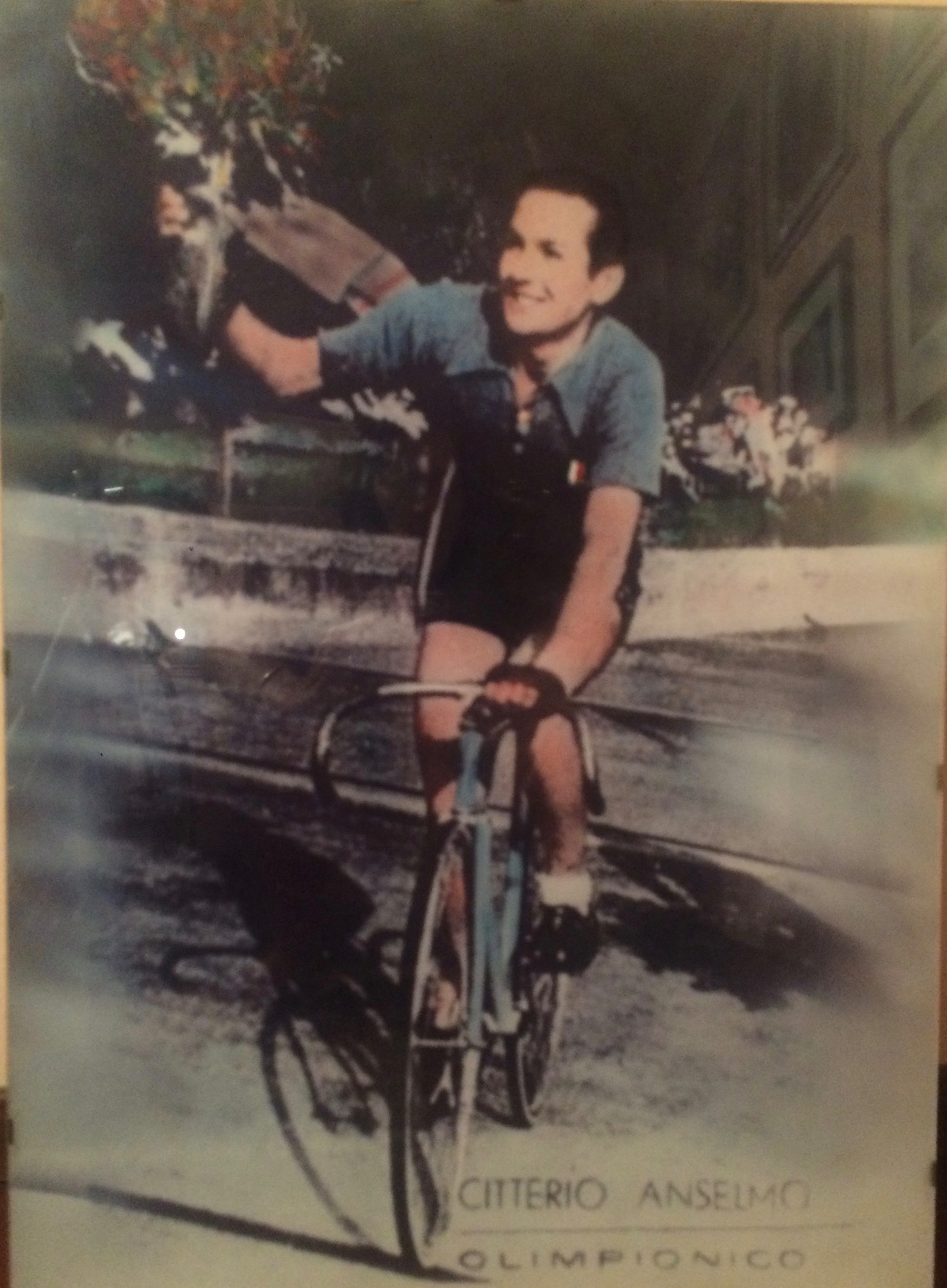

Personal information
- Born: 19 May 1927 Desio, Italy
- Died: 2 October 2006 (aged 79) Desio, Italy

Cycling career
- Sport: Cycling
Medal record
Men's cycling
Representing Italy
Olympic Games
Silver medal – second place	1948 London	Team pursuit

Anselmo Citterio (19 May 1927 – 2 October 2006) was an Italian cyclist. He was born in the Desio. He won a silver medal in team pursuit at the 1948 Summer Olympics in London, together with Rino Pucci, Arnaldo Benfenati and Guido Bernardi.
