= Benny Schnoor =

Danish cyclist

Personal information
- Born: 28 December 1922 Hovedstaden, Denmark
- Died: 5 September 2003 (aged 80) Hovedstaden, Denmark

Cycling career
- Sport: Cycling

Benny Schnoor (28 December 1922 – 5 September 2003) was a Danish cyclist. He competed in the team pursuit event at the 1948 Summer Olympics.
