= Alan Geldard =

British cyclist (1927–2018)

Personal information
- Full name: Robert Alan Geldard
- Born: 16 April 1927 Rochdale, Lancashire, England
- Died: 28 February 2018 (aged 90) Salford Royal Hospital, Salford, England

Cycling career
- Sport: Cycling

Amateur team
- Manchester Wheelers
Medal record
Men's cycling
Representing Great Britain
Olympic Games
Bronze medal – third place	1948 London	Team pursuit

Robert Alan Geldard (16 April 1927 – 26 February 2018) was a British cyclist.

== Early life ==
He was born in Rochdale, Lancashire. He left school at 14 and began to train as a commercial artist. As the Second World War was underway, at 17 he was recruited as a Bevin Boy (meaning that he was conscripted to work as a miner) which he continued until the start of 1948, when he returned to work as a commercial artist.

== Cycling career ==
After the War, rationing was still a fact of life, but being a member of the 1948 Olympic squad, he received extra monthly food parcels which had been donated by the British Empire nations. He won a bronze medal in the team pursuit at the 1948 Summer Olympics in London, together with David Ricketts, Tommy Godwin and Wilfred Waters. The team had to provide their own equipment. At the award ceremony, the organisers had forgotten to bring the medals to the track, so the winners were presented with flowers on the podium - Alan receiving his medal through the post a few weeks later. Alan had taken three weeks off his work as a commercial artist to train for the Games, and then got married a couple of weeks later. On his return, his employer sacked him for taking too much time off. “That was my reward for winning a medal for my country,” he said. Alan was selected to represent England in the 1950 Empire Games in New Zealand: he lost the chance of a medal when he punctured in his event.

After his racing career, Alan was involved in coaching. He was a club coach to two Manchester cycling clubs, Abbotsford Park RC and Altrincham RC: with the latter, he notably trained a group of non-specialist riders (Ian Donohue, Nigel Redmile, Ian Binder and John Herety) to gain silver medal in the National Team Pursuit Championships in both 1979 and 1980. He notably worked alongside, and was a good friend of the Senior Coach Harold "H" Nelson, providing Nelson's riders with specialist track coaching when requested.

In the buildup to the 2012 Summer Olympics (London), during a relay of the Olympic Torch around the UK, Alan handed the torch to Sebastian Coe, chairman of the London Organising Committee for the Olympic Games.

== Personal life ==
Geldard married Enid in 1948 and together they had three children. He suffered a stroke in 2001. Geldard died in February 2018 at the age of 90.

== Palmarès ==
1945
British Junior Massed Start Road Race Champion
1947

National Team Pursuit title (Manchester Wheelers)

1948
Bronze medallist, Olympic Games, Men's Team Pursuit
National 25 mile track Champion
1949
National 25 mile track Champion
