= Georges Vanbrabant =

Belgian cyclist

Personal information
- Born: 15 August 1926 Kozen (Niewerkerken)
- Died: 9 January 2011 (aged 84) Sint-Truiden

Cycling career
- Sport: Cycling

Georges Vanbrabant (15 August 1926 – 9 January 2011) was a Belgian cyclist. He competed in the team pursuit event at the 1948 Summer Olympics.
