= Enrique Molina (cyclist) =

Argentine cyclist

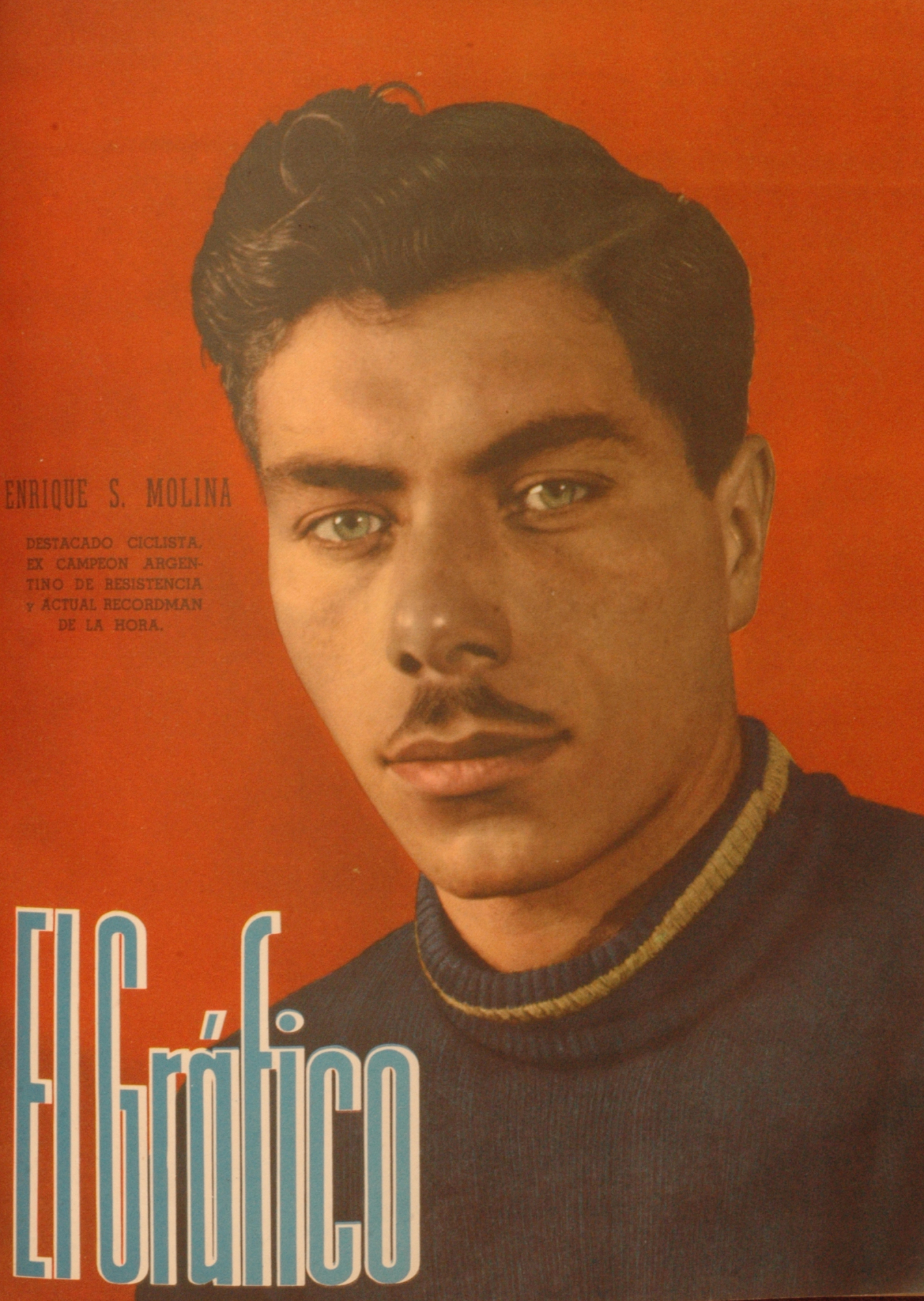
- Enrique Molina in 1940

Personal information
- Full name: Enrique Molina
- Born: 25 July 1919
- Died: 10 May 1998 (aged 78)

Cycling career
- Sport: Cycling

Enrique Molina (25 July 1919 – 10 May 1998) was an Argentine cyclist. He competed in the team pursuit event at the 1948 Summer Olympics.
