= Guido Bernardi =

Italian cyclist (1921–2002)

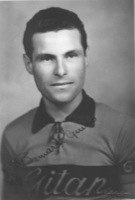

Personal information
- Born: 21 September 1921 Pontenure, Italy
- Died: 22 January 2002 (aged 80) Pontenure, Italy

Cycling career
- Sport: Cycling
Medal record
Men's cycling
Representing Italy
Olympic Games
Silver medal – second place	1948 London	Team pursuit

Guido Bernardi (21 September 1921 – 22 January 2002) was an Italian cyclist. He was born in Pontenure. He won a silver medal in team pursuit at the 1948 Summer Olympics in London, together with Arnaldo Benfenati, Anselmo Citterio and Rino Pucci.
