= Heinrich Schiebel =

Austrian cyclist (1926–2015)

Personal information
- Born: 24 November 1926
- Died: 6 November 2015 (aged 88)

Cycling career
- Sport: Cycling

Heinrich Schiebel (24 November 1926 – 6 November 2015) was an Austrian cyclist. He competed in the team pursuit event at the 1948 Summer Olympics. Schiebel died on 6 November 2015, at the age of 88.
