= Pierre Adam =

French cyclist (1924–2012)

Personal information
- Born: 24 April 1924 Paris, France
- Died: 24 September 2012 (aged 88) Gerde, Hautes-Pyrénées, France

Cycling career
- Sport: Cycling
Medal record
Representing France
Men's cycling
Olympic Games
| Gold medal – first place | 1948 London | Team pursuit |

Pierre Louis Eugène Adam (24 April 1924 – 24 September 2012) was a French cyclist. He was born in Paris. He won a gold medal in the team pursuit at the 1948 Summer Olympics in London, together with Fernand Decanali, Charles Coste and Serge Blusson.
