= Cyril Cartwright (cyclist) =

British cyclist

Personal information
- Full name: Cyril Cartwright
- Born: 28 January 1924 Dukinfield, Cheshire, England
- Died: 29 September 2015 (aged 91) Pistyll Wales
- Height: 5 ft 10 in (178 cm)

Cycling career
- Sport: Cycling
- Disciplines: Road and track
- Role: Rider
- Rider type: Pursuit

Amateur team
- Manchester Wheelers
Medal record
Cycling
Representing England
British Empire Games
Gold medal – first place	1950 Auckland	4,000m pursuit

Cyril Cartwright (28 January 1924 – 29 September 2015) was a British cyclist who held national records on the track and on the road and came second in the world amateur pursuit championship in Copenhagen in 1949. He held the British five-mile and 30-mile records.

Cyril Cartwright was a miner in the Dukinfield area of England. He won the national 25-mile time trial championship in 1948, one of the first riders in the country to beat one hour for the distance. He set a national record at 59m 18s. He won the British Empire Games (Now called the Commonwealth Games) 4,000m pursuit in Auckland, New Zealand, in 1950, beating the future Tour de France rider, Russell Mockridge. The ship journey to New Zealand took five weeks. Cartwright got in as many miles as he could before the ship left in January, including riding from Manchester to London and back over a weekend. He took 13 hours on the southbound journey, 11 hours going north. He said:

I had a five-weeks sea voyage ahead depending almost entirely on a set of rollers to keep fit at international level. Most of the time it was impossible to ride free-standing with two hands on the drops (The lower section of racing handlebars.) because it was necessary to hang on to the ship with one hand because of the rolling of the waves. If the sea was calm, I would have the rollers placed for and aft of the ship and ride with two hands. If the sea was rough, I rode port and starboard across the ship behind a bulkhead to keep the spray off me, hanging on for dear life with one hand.

Of his ride against Mockridge, he said:

I began to have doubts as he went off at the start like a cork from a bottle. In the first half he had 15 yards' lead on me after my weak start, but then I got down in my streamlined position and settled down to pace I knew I could hold. Four thousand metres can be a long way when you get tired, so Just slaved away at the pedals and waited for him to crack. After two laps he had increased his lead to 25 yards, then he started to struggle and at four laps I was level.

By three-quarter distance, Mockridge was struggling so badly that he gave up when he was 50 yards behind. As well as the gold medal, Cartwright received a certificate for the fastest time ridden in New Zealand.

Cartwright remembered: "As we boarded his ship [for the journey home], the captain didn't say 'Congratulations, nice work.' His words were: 'I've locked those rollers of yours in the hold for the voyage home. You were nothing but a nuisance on the way here but we don't want to have to put up with it on the way back.".

He stopped racing after not being selected for the Olympic Games in Helsinki in 1952.
