= Julio Alba =

Argentine cyclist

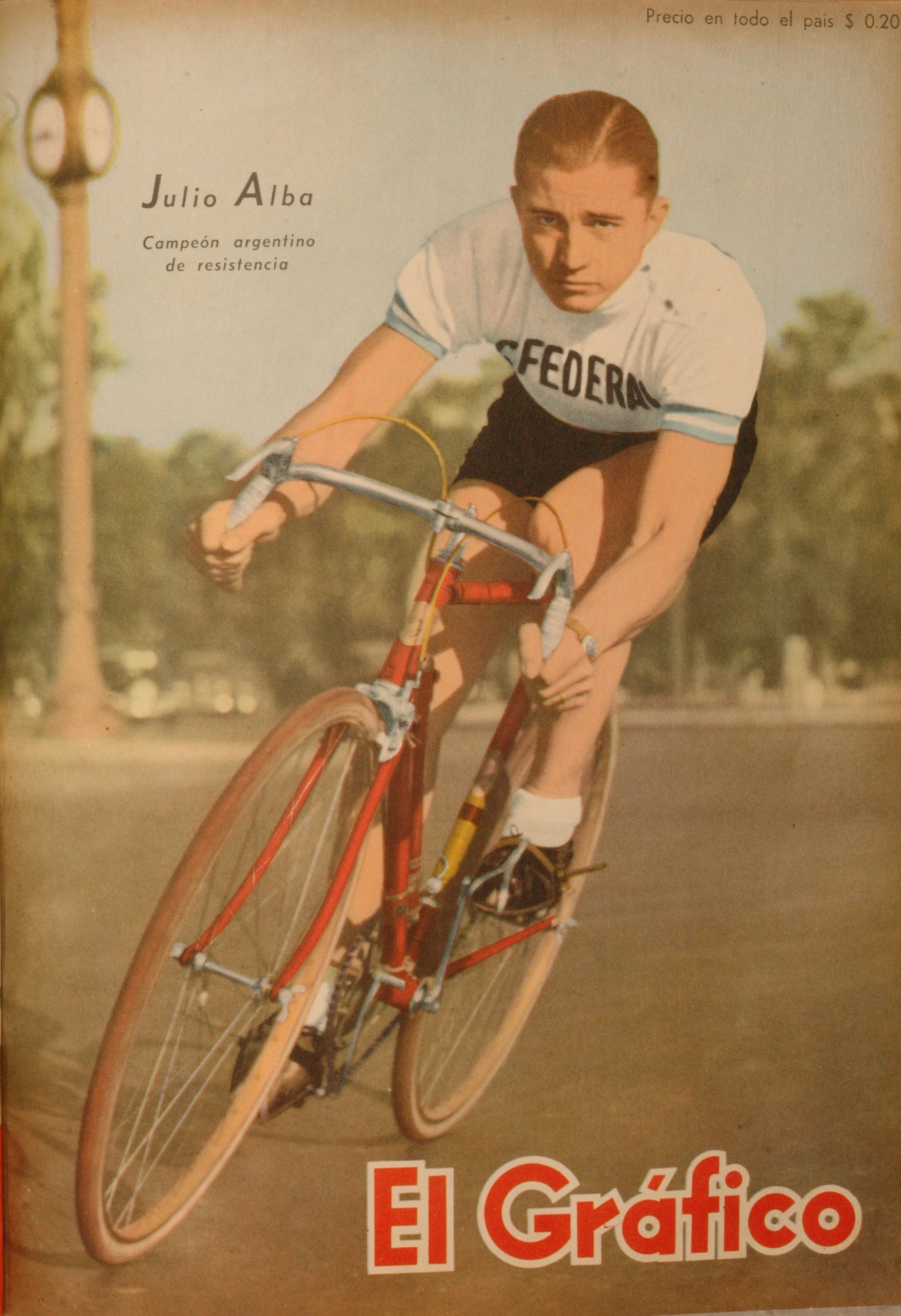

Personal information
- Full name: Julio Alba
- Born: 9 July 1922
- Died: 25 December 1997 (aged 75)

Cycling career
- Sport: Cycling

Julio Alba (9 July 1922 – 25 December 1997) was an Argentine cyclist. He competed in the team pursuit event at the 1948 Summer Olympics. Alba also won four consecutive national titles from 1944 to 1947.
