= Børge Gissel =

Danish cyclist

Personal information
- Born: 7 July 1915 Aarhus, Denmark
- Died: 6 April 2002 (aged 86) Fredericia, Denmark

Cycling career
- Sport: Cycling

Børge Gissel (7 July 1915 – 6 April 2002) was a Danish cyclist. He competed in the team pursuit event at the 1948 Summer Olympics.
