= Rino Pucci =

Italian cyclist (1922–1986)

Personal information
- Born: 29 January 1922 Pistoia, Italy
- Died: 10 December 1986 (aged 64)

Cycling career
- Sport: Cycling
Medal record
Men's cycling
Representing Italy
Olympic Games
Silver medal – second place	1948 London	Team pursuit

Rino Pucci (29 January 1922 – 10 December 1986) was an Italian cyclist. He was born in Pistoia. He won a silver medal in team pursuit at the 1948 Summer Olympics in London, together with Arnaldo Benfenati, Anselmo Citterio and Guido Bernardi.
