= Waldemar Bernatzky =

Uruguayan cyclist

Personal information
- Born: 28 September 1920 Nueva Helvecia, Uruguay
- Died: 31 December 2005 (aged 85)

Cycling career
- Sport: Cycling

Waldemar Bernatzky (28 September 1920 – 31 December 2005) was a Uruguayan cyclist. He competed in three events at the 1948 Summer Olympics.
