= David Ricketts (cyclist) =

British cyclist (1920–1996)

Personal information
- Full name: David Edward Joseph Ricketts
- Born: 7 October 1920 London, England
- Died: 11 August 1996 (aged 75) Wales

Cycling career
- Sport: Cycling

Amateur team
- Polytechnic CC
Medal record
Men's cycling
Representing Great Britain
Olympic Games
| Bronze medal – third place | 1948 London | Team pursuit |

David Edward Joseph Ricketts (7 October 1920 – 11 August 1996) was a British cyclist. He was born in London. He won a bronze medal in the team pursuit at the 1948 Summer Olympics in London, together with Alan Geldard, Tommy Godvin and Wilfred Waters.

In 1939, he finished runner up behind Bill Maxfield at the British National Individual Sprint Championships at Herne Hill.
