= Walter Freitag (cyclist) =

Austrian cyclist

Personal information
- Born: 24 March 1925

Cycling career
- Sport: Cycling

Walter Freitag (born 24 March 1925) is an Austrian former cyclist. He competed in the time trial and the team pursuit events at the 1948 Summer Olympics.
