= Bill Heseltine =

Australian cyclist

Personal information
- Born: Australia
Medal record
Men's Track cycling
Representing Australia
Commonwealth Games
Gold medal – first place	1950 Auckland	10 Mile Scratch Race

William David Heseltine was a three-time Australian cycling champion who while competing for Australia, won the 10-mile scratch on the track at the 1950 British Empire Games (now Commonwealth Games) in New Zealand.

Known as the country champion from his home state of Queensland, he took out the 3-mile state title in 1949 in a record time of 4 minutes 51.4 seconds, a feat that earned him a shot at the Australian championships. In the 10-mile Australian race, Heseltine and fellow Queenslander Ken Caves put a lap on the rest of the field, allowing them to go head to head for the title. With a lap to go, Cave lead, but Heseltine joined Cave with 300 yards to go. It wasn't until the last 50 yards that Heseltine hit the front. He went on to beat Cave by a bike's length. He was then selected for the Empire Games in February 1950, where he won the gold medal in games record time.

Heseltine went on to win a large number of Queensland titles as well as 3 Australian Championships. Bill Heseltine missed a real chance at an Australian call up for the 1952 Olympic team when he suffered an horrific bike smash.
