= Gaston Gerosa =

Swiss cyclist

Personal information
- Born: 15 August 1923 Zürich, Switzerland
- Died: 24 December 2002 (aged 79)

Cycling career
- Sport: Cycling

Gaston Gerosa (15 August 1923 – 24 December 2002) was a Swiss cyclist. He competed in the team pursuit event at the 1948 Summer Olympics.
