= Juan de Armas =

Uruguayan cyclist (1922–2008)

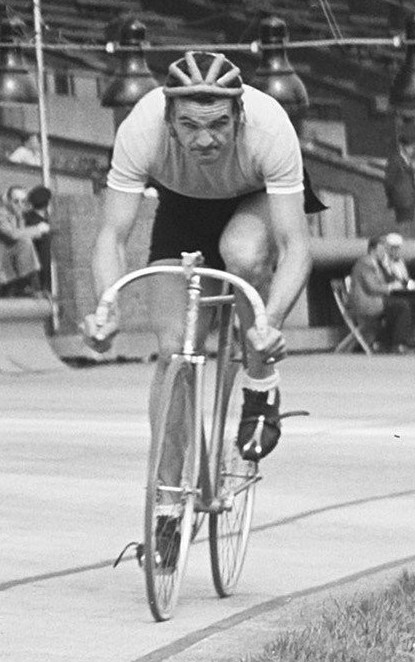
- Juan de Armas (1948)

Personal information
- Full name: Juan Ramón de Armas Ferrari
- Born: 31 August 1922 Montevideo, Uruguay
- Died: 25 December 2008 (aged 86) Montevideo, Uruguay

Cycling career
- Sport: Cycling

Juan Ramón de Armas Ferrari (31 August 1922 – 25 December 2008) was a Uruguayan cyclist. He competed at the 1948 and 1952 Summer Olympics. De Armas died in Montevideo on 25 December 2008, at the age of 86.
