= Thomas Montemage =

American cyclist

Personal information
- Born: January 21, 1927 Buffalo, New York, United States
- Died: January 31, 2014 (aged 87) Williamsville, New York

Cycling career
- Sport: Cycling

Thomas Montemage (January 21, 1927 – January 31, 2014) was an American cyclist. He competed at the 1948, 1952 and 1964 Summer Olympics.
