= Augusto Gerosa =

Italian ice hockey player

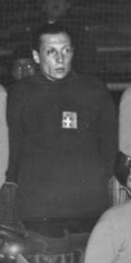
- Born: 1 October 1909; Milan, Italy
- Died: 7 November 1982 (aged 73)
- Position: Goaltender
- National team: Italy

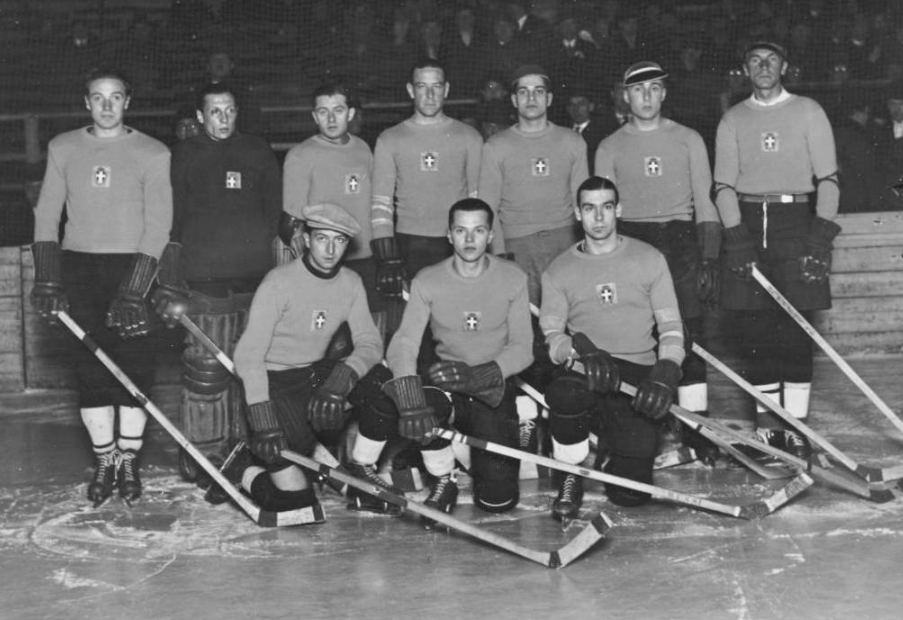

Augusto Gerosa (1 October 1909 – 7 November 1982) was an Italian ice hockey player. He competed in the men's tournament at the 1936 Winter Olympics.
