= Paavo Kuusinen =

Finnish cyclist

Personal information
- Born: 2 December 1914 Hämeenlinna, Grand Duchy of Finland
- Died: 31 October 1979 (aged 64) Hämeenlinna, Finland

Cycling career
- Sport: Cycling

Paavo Kuusinen (2 December 1914 – 31 October 1979) was a Finnish cyclist. He competed in the team pursuit event at the 1948 Summer Olympics.
