= William Hamilton (cyclist) =

Canadian cyclist

Personal information
- Born: 1930 Oshawa, Ontario, Canada
- Died: 23 November 2017 (aged 86–87) Haliburton County, Ontario, Canada

Cycling career
- Sport: Cycling

William Hamilton (1930 – 23 November 2017) was a Canadian cyclist. He competed in the team pursuit event at the 1948 Summer Olympics.
