= Hans Pfenninger =

Swiss cyclist (1929–2009)

Personal information
- Born: 16 September 1929 Zurich, Switzerland
- Died: 17 December 2009 (aged 80) Zurich, Switzerland

Cycling career
- Sport: Cycling

Hans Pfenninger (16 September 1929 – 17 December 2009) was a Swiss cyclist. He competed at the 1948 and 1952 Summer Olympics.
