= Graham Hughes (cyclist) =

New Zealand cyclist (1916–2013)

Personal information
- Birth name: Edward Leonard Graham Hughes
- Born: 23 February 1916; Auckland, New Zealand
- Died: 14 January 2013 (aged 96); Taupaki, New Zealand

Sport
- Country: New Zealand
- Sport: Cycling
- Club: Lynndale Amateur Cycling Club

Edward Leonard Graham Hughes (23 February 1916 – 14 January 2013) was a New Zealand racing cyclist.

Born in the Auckland suburb of Morningside on 23 February 1916, Hughes was the son of Florence Ethel Hughes (née Graham) and Alfred John Hughes. By 1932, he was racing as junior member of the Manukau Amateur Cycling Club, before moving to the Lynndale Amateur Cycling Club the following year.

Hughes won the combined Auckland provincial and North Island 100-miles road race championship in October 1936, beating Ronald Triner by three seconds in a time of 4:53:08. Three weeks later, in the national road race championship, Hughes retired in the later stages due to cramp. At the 1937 national amateur track cycling championships, held at Western Springs Stadium in Auckland, Hughes was runner-up in the paced 10-mile event. In October 1937, Hughes won the national amateur 100-miles road race title raced in Canterbury, recording a time of 4:37:17 to beat Ronald Triner in a sprint finish. The race was also the first trial for selection for the New Zealand team for the 1938 British Empire Games; the second trial was a 100 km race in North Canterbury two days later, in which Hughes punctured; and he was not one of the three cyclists selected for the Games road race team. Later the same month, he recorded the third-fastest time in the annual Palmerston North to Wellington amateur road race, which doubled as the North Island amateur road race championship.

After missing selection for the road race at the 1938 British Empire Games, Hughes contested the trials for the New Zealand track cycling team. After the first trials in Auckland in December 1937, he was provisionally named in the team to compete in the 1 km time trial and the 10-mile track race. However, after the second trials in Christchurch the next month, he was controversially omitted from the New Zealand team.

Hughes finished third in the 1938 national amateur road race championship, and was unplaced in the same event in 1939.

At the 1950 British Empire Games in Auckland, Hughes placed eighth in the 1 km time trial with a time of 1:17.1.

Hughes died on 14 January 2013, and was buried at Waikumete Cemetery, Auckland.
