= Malcolm Campbell (cyclist) =

Welsh cyclist

Personal information
- Nationality: British (Welsh)
- Born: c. 1931 Cardiff, Wales

Sport
- Sport: Cycling
- Event(s): Track and Road
- Club: Byways RCC (Cardiff)

Malcolm T. Campbell (born c. 1931) is a former racing cyclist from Wales, who represented Wales at two British Empire Games (now Commonwealth Games).

== Biography ==
Campbell, born in Cardiff, Wales, was the Welsh mass start champion in 1948 and was the Welsh 25-mile champion in 1949.

At the 1950 British Empire Games in Auckland, New Zealand, he represented Wales at the 1950 British Empire Games and participated in the Road Race, 10 mile scratch and 4,000 metres pursuit events.

Campbell was just one of three Welsh athletes to attend the Games and this was only possible by being temporarily released from his National Service. He arrived back in Southampton, England on the liner Tamaroa in April 1950 and after attending a reception organised by the Mayor of Newport reported to Brecon Barracks to resume his National Service. Campbell was living in Lawrenny Avenue, Leckwith, Cardiff at the time.

Later that year, Campbell was a lance-corporal in the Welch Regiment and won the Welsh mass start title.

Campbell won the 1953 Welsh pursuit title and attended his second Commonwealth Games, when he took part in the road race during the 1954 British Empire and Commonwealth Games in Vancouver, Canada.
