= Atilio François =

Uruguayan cyclist

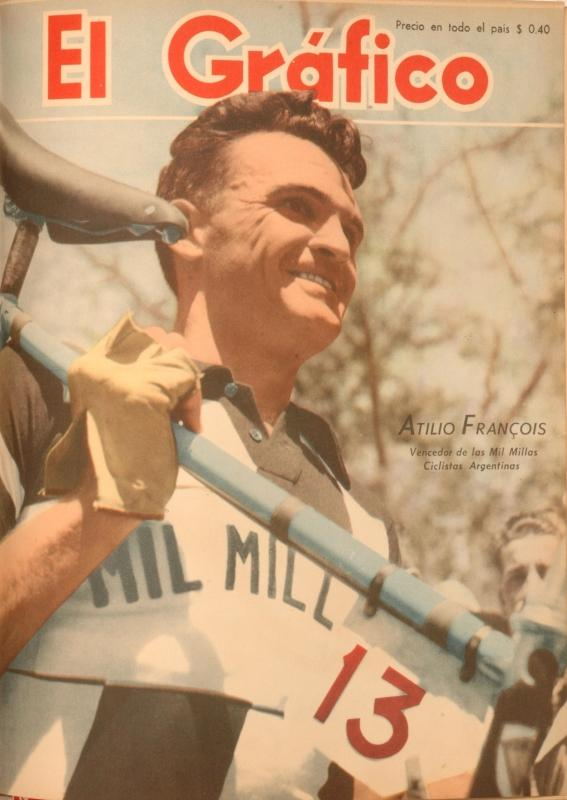

Personal information
- Born: 22 May 1922 Colonia, Uruguay
- Died: 27 September 1997 (aged 75) Montevideo, Uruguay

Cycling career
- Sport: Cycling

Atilio François (22 May 1922 – 27 September 1997) was a Uruguayan cyclist. He competed at the 1948 and 1952 Summer Olympics.
