= Cycling at the 1948 Summer Olympics =

Cycling at the Games of the XIV Olympiad
- Venues: Windsor Great Park; Herne Hill Velodrome
- Date: 7 –11 August 1948
- Competitors: 188 from 33 nations

The cycling competition at the 1948 Summer Olympics in London consisted of two road cycling events and four track cycling events, all for men only. The track cycling events were held at the Herne Hill Velodrome in south London. The road race events were held in Windsor Great Park, south of Windsor.

== Medal summary ==
=== Road cycling ===
Games	Gold	Silver	Bronze
Road race, Individual	José Beyaert; France	Gerrit Voorting; Netherlands	Lode Wouters; Belgium
Road race, Team	Belgium; Léon Delathouwer; Eugène van Roosbroeck; Lode Wouters	Great Britain; Robert John Maitland; Ian Scott; Gordon Thomas; Ernie Clements	France; José Beyaert; Jacques Dupont; Alain Moineau

=== Track cycling ===
Games	Gold	Silver	Bronze
Pursuit, Team	France; Fernand Decanali; Pierre Adam; Serge Blusson; Charles Coste	Italy; Rino Pucci; Arnaldo Benfenati; Guido Bernardi; Anselmo Citterio	Great Britain; Wilfred Waters; Robert Geldard; Tommy Godwin; David Ricketts
Sprint	Mario Ghella; Italy	Reg Harris; Great Britain	Axel Schandorff; Denmark
Tandem	Renato Perona and Ferdinando Teruzzi (ITA)	Alan Bannister and Reg Harris (GBR)	Gaston Dron and René Faye (FRA)
Time trial	Jacques Dupont; France	Pierre Nihant; Belgium	Tommy Godwin; Great Britain

== Participating nations ==
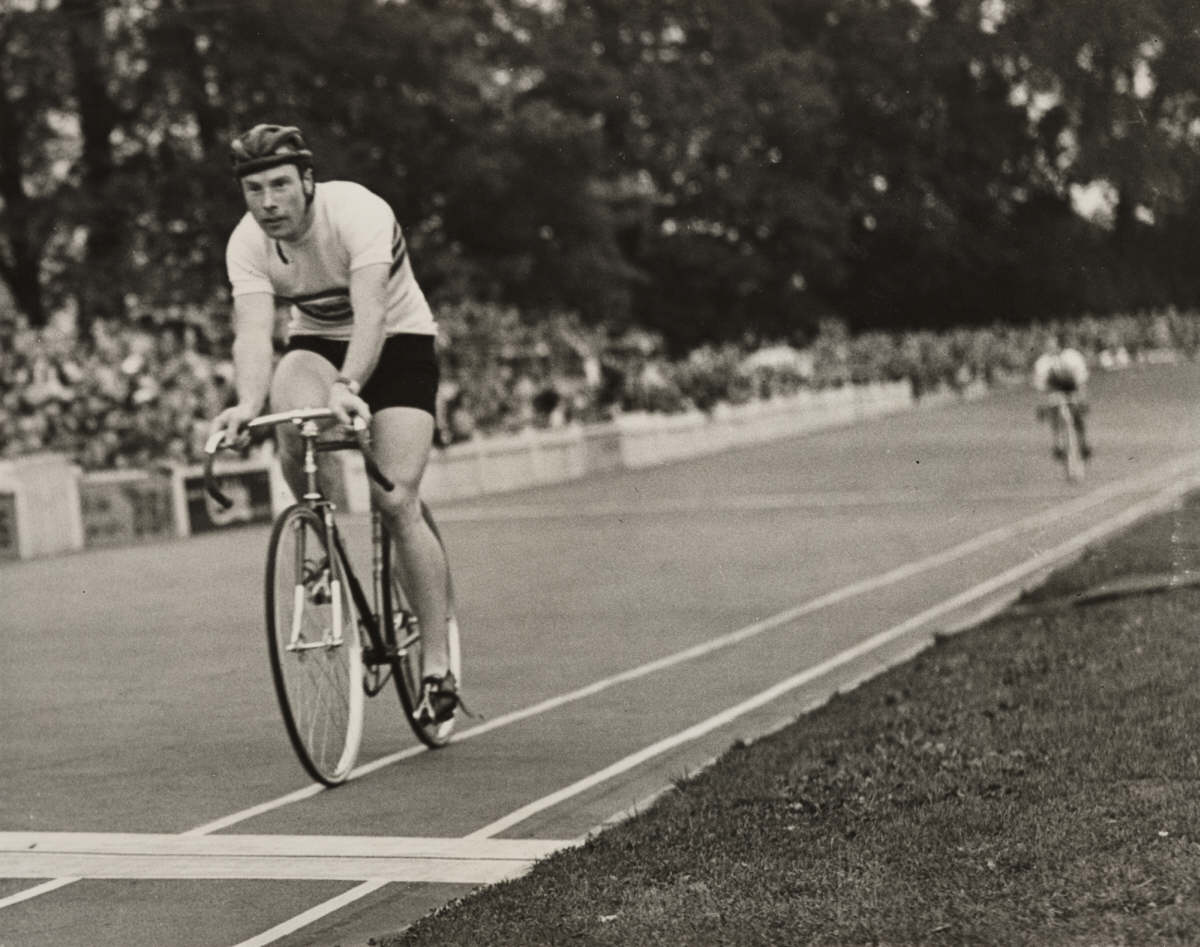
Reg Harris wins the quarter-final of the 1000m time trial

188 cyclists from 33 nations competed.

- Argentina (12)
- Australia (6)
- Austria (8)
- Belgium (12)
- Canada (6)
- Republic of China (1)
- Cuba (1)
- Denmark (11)
- Finland (5)
- France (11)
- Great Britain (10)
- Greece (3)
- Guyana (1)
- India (9)
- Italy (12)
- South Korea (2)
- Luxembourg (4)
- Mexico (5)
- Netherlands (9)
- New Zealand (1)
- Norway (4)
- Pakistan (2)
- Peru (3)
- South Africa (3)
- Sweden (4)
- Switzerland (11)
- Trinidad and Tobago (1)
- Turkey (4)
- United States (9)
- Uruguay (9)
- Venezuela (1)
- Yugoslavia (4)

== Medal table ==
Rank	Nation	Gold	Silver	Bronze	Total
1	France	3	0	2	5
2	Italy	2	1	0	3
3	Belgium	1	1	1	3
4	Great Britain	0	3	2	5
5	Netherlands	0	1	0	1
6	Denmark	0	0	1	1
Totals (6 entries)		6	6	6	18
