= Les Lock =

New Zealand racing cyclist (1929–2003)

Personal information
- Born: Leslie Percival Lock; 3 June 1929 Christchurch, New Zealand
- Died: 21 January 2003 (aged 73)
Medal record
Men's Track cycling
Representing New Zealand
Commonwealth Games
| Silver medal – second place | 1950 Auckland | 10 Mile Scratch Race |
| Bronze medal – third place | 1950 Auckland | Individual Pursuit |

Leslie Percival Lock (3 June 1929 – 21 January 2003) was a New Zealand racing cyclist.

Born in Christchurch on 3 June 1929, Lock became involved in cycling through his job as a newspaper delivery boy. He joined the Avon Cycling Club and won his first national title, the junior five-mile road race, in 1946. He went on to win the New Zealand senior 10-mile road race title four times—in 1948, 1949, 1950 and 1957—and the 4000 m individual pursuit title three consecutive times from 1949 to 1951. In all, he won 14 national championship titles.

At the 1950 British Empire Games in Auckland, Lock won the silver medal in the men's 10-mile scratch race and finished third in the 4000 m individual pursuit. He also placed fifth in the 1 km time trial. Four years later at the 1954 British Empire and Commonwealth Games in Vancouver, Lock competed in all of the track events as well as in the road race. His best result was fifth in the 10-mile scratch race.

Lock retired from competitive cycling following the 1957 national championships. He died on 21 January 2003, and was buried at Memorial Park Cemetery, Christchurch.
