= Tommy Godwin (cyclist, born 1920) =

English cyclist (1920–2012)

Personal information
- Born: 5 November 1920 Connecticut, United States
- Died: 3 November 2012 (aged 91) Solihull, England

Cycling career
- Sport: Cycling
- Discipline: Track

Amateur team
- Rover Cycling Club
Medal record
Representing Great Britain
Men's track cycling
Olympic Games
Bronze medal – third place	1948 London	1km time trial
Bronze medal – third place	1948 London	Team pursuit
British Empire Games
Bronze medal – third place	1950 Auckland	1km time trial

Thomas Charles Godwin (5 November 1920 – 3 November 2012) was a British track cyclist, active during the 1940s and 1950s. He held national records and raced abroad. He later became a coach, manager, and administrator.

In 2010 he was selected as an ambassador for the 2012 London Olympics. In 2012, aged 91, he was selected to take part in the Olympic torch relay, carrying it through Solihull.

== Origins ==
Godwin was born in Connecticut, United States to British parents in 1920. The family returned to Britain in 1932. His first bicycle was a Wrenson's delivery bike which he used to run errands for a local grocer. He became interested in cycling because of the 1936 Summer Olympics. Arie van Vliet's riding in the 1,000-metre time-trial inspired him; British amateur champion W. W. Maxfield was also an early hero. Godwin began racing three years later and rode the fastest 1,000m of the season at the Alexander Sports Ground. He was invited to trials in the Midlands to find riders for the next Olympics, despite not yet having won a race.

He won a 1,000m at The Butts track in Coventry on 29 July 1939. His chances of Olympic selection ended with the Second World War. He envied Reg Harris and Dave Ricketts for being selected for the world championship at a young age, "not that I had any claims to such honors but because their good fortune provided them with expert tuition and decent tracks for training. In the Midlands, this all seemed so far away."

Godwin was an apprentice electrician in a reserved occupation during the war, working for BSA. But there was little competitive cycling and he rode at only 13 meetings between 1940 and the end of 1942.

The change in war fortunes meant more sport in Britain from 1943. Godwin was unbeaten in five-mile scratch events and won the Cattlow Trophy at Fallowfield, Manchester, that year and in 1944. In the national championship of 1944, at which Harris made his breakthrough, Godwin won the five-mile. He repeated this success in 1945, adding the 25-mile title which he retained in 1946. In 1949 he won the 4000 metres event. He won the BSA Gold Column, offered by his employers, by winning the five-mile at Herne Hill in south London in 1945.

== Post-war competition ==
The win at Herne Hill, the first time he had ridden there, "must have impressed, for an invitation to ride in Paris came my way," he said in the British weekly, The Bicycle. "Being the first international test after cessation of hostilities it was indeed a great honour."

At the 1948 Summer Olympics in London, Godwin won two bronze medals, in the team pursuit, with Robert Geldard, Dave Ricketts, and Wilfrid Waters, and in the 1,000m time trial. Preparation for the pursuit was hampered by an argument among the coaching staff on the eve of the games, but after a poor performance in the qualifying round, they improved their time by 17 seconds in the subsequent three rounds, winning the bronze in a time faster than the French achieved in the final.

He came third in the 1,000m at the 1950 British Empire Games.

== Career after racing ==
Godwin managed the British cycling team at the 1964 Summer Olympics in Tokyo, became president of the British Cycling Federation and the Solihull Cycling Club. He ran the first British training camp in Mallorca, Spain, and the first track course at Lilleshall, and founded the Birmingham RCC. He was Britain's first paid national coach and trained a generation of British track riders, many of whom won national and international titles and medals. They included Graham Webb, who beat the British hour record and won the world road race championship, and Mick Bennett, who won bronze medals at the 1972 and 1976 Olympics.

From 1936 to 1950, he worked for BSA. For 36 years from 1950, he ran a cycle shop in Silver Street in the Kings Heath district of Birmingham. His autobiography It Wasn't That Easy: The Tommy Godwin Story was published in 2007 by John Pinkerton Memorial Publishing Fund. He was president of Solihull Cycling Club. His wife, Eileen, died on 5 January 2011.

== 2012 Summer Olympics ==
Godwin was an ambassador for the 2012 Summer Olympics in London. On 27 July 2010 he appeared on the BBC One programme "London 2012: Two Years to Go", praising the new velodrome taking shape. He was interviewed by BBC presenter Sophie Raworth and showed his two Olympic bronze medals.

When aged 91 he was selected to participate in the Olympic Torch relay, to carry it on a 300-metre leg through Solihull on 1 July 2012.

Godwin died at the Marie Curie Hospice in Solihull on 3 November 2012.
